= List of Indian English poetry anthologies =

This is a list of anthologies of Indian English Poetry.

== History ==
Indian English Poetry is one of the oldest forms of Indian English Literature. Indian poets writing in English have succeeded in Indianizing English in order to reveal nuances of Indian culture or cultures. Henry Louis Vivian Derozio, Sri Aurobindo, Sarojini Naidu, Michael Madhusudan Dutt and Toru Dutt among others laid the foundation of Indian English Poetry but since then there has been tremendous development in Indian English Poetry both in stylistic and thematic concerns. Nissim Ezekiel with the publication of his first book, A Time to Change, in 1952 heralded in a new era of Modern Indian English Poetry. Since then notable poets like A. K. Ramanujan, R. Parthasarathy, Jayanta Mahapatra, Dom Moraes, Kamala Das, Keki N. Daruwalla, Arvind Krishna Mehrotra, Arun Kolatkar, Dilip Chitre, Eunice De Souza, Gieve Patel, P. Lal, Syed Ameeruddin and many others have taken Modern Indian English Poetry to new heights exploring culture and the human condition.

The younger generation of notable poets writing in English are Adil Jussawalla, A. J. Thomas, Abhay K, Anju Makhija, Anjum Hasan, Hoshang Merchant, Madan Gopal Gandhi, Arundhathi Subramaniam, Bibhu Padhi, C. P. Surendran, Dileep Jhaveri, Anuradha Bhattacharyya, Gopi Kottoor, Jayanta Mahapatra, Jeet Thayil, Jerry Pinto, K Srilata, K. V. Dominic, D. C. Chambial, T. Vasudeva Reddy, Makarand Paranjape, Mani Rao, Meena Kandasamy, Nandini Sahu, Ranjit Hoskote, Robin Ngangom, Nitoo Das, Rukmini Bhaya Nair, Jaydeep Sarangi, Sudeep Sen, Sukrita Paul Kumar, Nalini Priyadarshni, Gopi Kottoor, Vijay Nambisan, Vihang A. Naik, Tapan Kumar Pradhan, Amitabh Mitra and Yuyutsu Sharma among others.

Modern expatriate Indian poets writing in English include Meena Alexander, Ravi Shankar, Amitabh Mitra, Sujata Bhatt, Tabish Khair, Vikram Seth, Vijay Seshadri and Yuyutsu Sharma among others.

== Anthology ==
In book publishing, an anthology is a collection of literary works chosen by the compiler. It may be a collection of poems, short stories, plays, songs, or excerpts, usually collected into a single volume for publication.

Although Indian English Poetry dates back to the 19th century it was only in the 1950s that a comprehensive anthology of Indian English Poetry was published. Early efforts in the publication of Indian English Poetry anthologies were made in the 1920s, 1930s and 1940s but they were extremely infrequent and made very little impact. However, since the 1950s there has been a steady amount of anthologies published every decade.

== List of Poetry Anthologies ==
=== Early Indian English Poetry Anthologies ===
- India in Song: Eastern Themes in English Verse by British and Indian Poets (1918) ed. Theodore Douglas Dunn and published by H. Milford
- The Bengali Book of English Verse (1918) ed. Theodore Douglas Dunn and Rabindranath Tagore
- An Anthology of Modern Indian Poetry (1927) ed. by Gwendoline Goodwin and published by J. Murray
- An Anthology of Indo-Anglian Verse (1935) ed. by A. R. Chinda
- The Peacock Lute: Anthology of Poems in English by Indians (1945) ed. and published by V. N. Bhushan, Padma Publications, Bombay
- This Strange Adventure: An Anthology of Poems in English by Indians 1828-1946 (1947) ed. Fredoon Kabraji and published by New India Pub. Co., London

=== 1950s ===
- Modern Indian Poetry (1958) ed. by A.V. Rajeswara Rau and published by Kavita, New Delhi
- Modern Indo-Anglian Poetry (1959) ed. by P. Lal & K. Raghavendra Rao and published by Kavita, New Delhi

=== 1960s ===
During the 1960s the publication of Indian English Poetry Anthologies took place outside of India mostly in America and in the United Kingdom. See list of Indian English Poetry Anthologies Published Abroad below.

=== 1970s ===
- The Golden Treasury of Indo-Anglian Poetry (1828–1965) (1970) ed. by Vinayak Krishna Gokak and published by Sahitya Akademi, New Delhi
- Modern Indian Poetry in English: An Anthology & A Credo (1971) ed. by P. Lal and published by Writers Workshop, Calcutta
- Contemporary Indian Poetry in English (1972) ed. by Peeradina and published by Laxmi Publication, New Delhi
- Indian Poetry in English (1947–1972) (1972) ed. by Pritish Nandy and published by Oxford & IBH Pub. Co., New Delhi
- Contemporary Indian Poetry in English: An Assessment and Selection (1972) ed. by Saleem Peeradina and published by Macmillan Co. of India, Nagpur
- Indian Poetry in English Today (1974) ed. by Pritish Nandy and published by Sterling Publication, New Delhi
- An Anthology of Indo-English Poetry (1974) ed. by Gauri Deshpande and published by Hind Pocket Books, New Delhi
- New Writing in India (1974) ed. by Adil Jussawalla and published by Penguin Books Ltd., New Delhi
- Ten Twentieth-Century Indian Poets (1976) ed. by R. Parthasarathy and published by Oxford University Press, New Delhi
- An Anthology of Indian Love Poetry (1976) ed. by Subash Saha and published by Prayer Books/ Firma KLM
- Indian Verse in English: A Contemporary Anthology (1977) ed. by Syed Ameeruddin and published by Poets Press India, Madras
- Strangertime: An Anthology of Indian Poetry in English (1977) ed. by Pritish Nandy and published by Hind Pocket Books, New Delhi
- Hundred Indian Poets: An Anthology of Modern Poetry (1977) ed. by Pranab Bandyopadhyay and published by Oxford India, New Delhi

=== 1980s ===
- Indian Verse by Young Poets (1980) ed. by Pranab Bandyopadhyay and published by United Writers, Calcutta
- Two Decades of Indian Poetry (1960–1980) (1980) ed. by K. N. Daruwalla and published by Vikas Publishing House, New Delhi
- Indian Poetry in English: A Literary History and Anthology (1980) ed. by Amar Nath Dwivedi and published by Humanities Press
- 19 Poets: An Anthology of Contemporary Indo-English Poetry (1981) ed. by Keshav Malik and Manohar Bandopadhyay and published by Prachi Prakashan, New Delhi
- New Voices in Indo-English Verse (1981) ed. by Syed Ameeruddin and published by Poets Press India, Madras
- New Dimensions in Indo-English Poetry (1981) ed. by O. P. Bhatnagar and published by The Rajasthan Journal of English Studies (Nos. 13 and 14), Amravati
- Modern Trends in Indo-Anglian Poetry (1982) ed. by H. S. Bhatia and published by Sita Publications International, Punjab
- The Lotus: An Anthology of Contemporary Indian Religious Poetry in English (1988) ed. by Prabhu Guptara and published by Writers Workshop Calcutta
- An Anthology of Indian English Poetry (1989) ed. by R. P. Singh & S. K. Prasad and published by Orient BlackSwan, Hyderabad
- Indian English Poetry Since 1950: An Anthology (1989) ed. by Vilas Sarang and published by Orient BlackSwan, Hyderabad

=== 1990s ===
- Twenty Indian Poems (1990) ed. by Arvind Krishna Mehrotra and published by Oxford University Press, New Delhi
- Modern Indian Poetry in English (1991) ed. by Ayyappa Paniker & Various and published by Sahitya Akademi, New Delhi
- The Oxford India Anthology of Twelve Modern Indian Poets (1992) ed. by Arvind Krishna Mehrotra and published by Oxford University Press, New Delhi
- An Anthology of New Indian English Poetry (1993) ed. by Makarand Paranjape and published by Rupa & Company, New Delhi
- Indian Poetry in English (1993) ed. by Makarand Paranjape and published by Macmillan, Bombay
- The Oxford Anthology of Modern Indian Poetry (1994) ed. by Vinay Dharwadker & A. K. Ramanujan and published by Oxford University Press, New Delhi
- Nine Indian Women Poets: An Anthology (1997) ed. by Eunice de Souza and published by Oxford University Press, New Delhi
- Accent on Indian English Poetry (1998) ed. by Ed. H. S. Shivaprakash and published by Indian Literature Special issue (No.4. issue 186) Sahitya Akademi, New Delhi
- A Decade of Poetry (1997–98) eds. Prabhanjan K. Mishra, Menka Shivdasani, Jerry Pinto and Ranjit Hoskote Special edition (Vols. 6 and 7) of Poiesis : A Journal of Poetry Circle, Bombay

=== 2000s ===
- Indian Poetry in English (2000) ed. by Makarand Paranjape and published by Laxmi Publications, New Delhi
- A New Book of Indian Poems In English (2000) ed. by Gopi Kottoor and published by Poetry Chain and Writers Workshop, Calcutta
- Twenty Indian Poems (2001) ed. by Arvind Krishna Mehrotra and published by Oxford University Press, New Delhi
- Reasons for Belonging: Fourteen Contemporary Indian Poets (2002) ed. by Ranjit Hoskote and published by Viking, New Delhi
- Anthology of Contemporary Poetry from the Northeast (2003) ed. by Robin S. Ngangom and Kynpham Singh Nongkyrih and published by NEHU Publications, Shillong
- An Anthology of Indian Poems: Native Petals (2005) ed. by Prof. (Dr.) Jancy James, Prof.(Dr.) Usha Menon, & Prof. M.Bhaskara Prasad. Published by Poetree Garden, Kerala University P.O., Trivandrum-695 034, Kerala, India.
- Confronting Love: Poems (2005) ed. by Jerry Pinto & Arundhati Subramanian and published by Penguin Books India, New Delhi
- Poetry with Young People (2007) ed. by Gieve Patel and published by Sahitya Akademi, New Delhi
- 60 Indian Poets (2008) ed. by Jeet Thayil and published by Penguin Books India, New Delhi
- The Golden Treasure of Writers Workshop Poetry (2008) ed. by Rubana Huq and published by Writers Workshop, Calcutta
- We Speak in Changing Languages: Indian Women Poets (1990–2007) (2009) ed. by Ramakrishnan, E. V. and Anju Makhija and published by Sahitya Akademi, New Delhi
- Dancing Earth: An Anthology of Poetry from North-East India (2009) ed. by Robin S. Ngangom & Kynpham S. Nongkynrih and published by Penguin Books India, New Delhi

=== 2010s ===
- The Oxford Anthology of Writings from North East India – Poetry and Essays (2010) ed. by Tilottoma Misra and published by Oxford University Press, New Delhi
- Early Indian Poetry in English: An Anthology (1829–1947) (2010) ed. by Eunice de Souza and published by Oxford University Press, New Delhi
- A Collection of Indian English Poetry (2011) ed. by Radha Mohan Singh and published by Orient BlackSwan, Hyderabad
- The HarperCollins Book of English Poetry (2012) ed. by Sudeep Sen and published by HarperCollins, Noida ISBN 9789350290415
- These My Words: The Penguin Book of Indian Poetry (2012) ed. by Eunice de Souza and Melanie Silgardo and published by Penguin Books India, New Delhi
- Ten: New Indian Poetry (2012) ed. by Jayanta Mahapatra & Yuyutsu Sharma and published by Nirala Publications, New Delhi
- The Dance of the Peacock: An Anthology of English Poetry from India (2013) ed. by Vivekanand Jha and published by Hidden Brook Press, Canada
- Exiled Among Natives (2013) eds. by Prof. Charu Sheel Singh, Dr. Binod Mishra and published by Adhyayan Publishers, New Delhi
- Scaling Heights : An Anthology of Contemporary Indian English Poetry (2013) eds. by Dr. Gopal Lahiri and Dr. Kirti Sengupta and published by Authorspress, New Delhi
- Suvarnarekha: An Anthology of Indian Women Poets Writing in English (2014) ed. by Dr. Nandini Sahu and published by The Poetry Society of India, New Delhi
- Tattooed with Taboos: An Anthology of Poetry by Three Women from Northeastern India(2015) ed. by Chaoba Phuritshabam, Shreema Ningombam & Soibam Haripriya and published by Partridge India, New Delhi
- Contemporary Indian English Poetry: The Enchanting Verses Literary Review special edition: (2015) ed. by Abhay K and published by The Enchanting Verses Literary Review.
- Dilli: An Anthology of Women Poets of Delhi (2014) ed.by Semeen Ali and published by Poets Printery, South Africa & New Delhi
- 40 Under 40: An Anthology of Post-Globalisation (2016) ed. by Nabina Das & Semeen Ali and published by Paperwall Media & Publishing, Mumbai
- Trainstorm : An Anthology of Alternative Train Poetry (2016) ed. by Amitabh Mitra and published by Poets Printery, South Africa & New Delhi
- Home Thoughts: Poems from British Indian Diaspora (2017) ed. by Usha Kishore and Jaydeep Sarangi and published by Cyberwit India, Allahabad
- Trips and Trials : A Selection of Poems and Songs (2018) ed. by Jayshree Misra Tripathi and published by PepperScript, Delhi
- Travelogue : The Grand Indian Express (2018) ed. by Dr. Ananad Kumar and published by Authorspress, New Delhi
- 100 Great Indian Poems (2018) ed. by Abhay K. and published by Bloomsbury India, New Delhi
- 100 More Great Indian Poems (2019) ed. by Abhay K. and published by Bloomsbury India, New Delhi
- Modern English Poetry by Younger Indians (2019) ed. by Sudeep Sen and published by Sahitya Akademi, New Delhi
- The Lie of the Land (2019) ed. by Goutam Karmakar and published by Sahitya Akademi, New Delhi

=== 2020s ===
- The Bloomsbury Anthology of Great Indian Poems (2020) ed. by Abhay K. and published by Bloomsbury India, New Delhi
- PEACOCKS IN A DREAM: AN ANTHOLOGY OF CONTEMPORARY INDIAN ENGLISH VERSE (2020) ed. by Inam Hussain Mullick and Subrata Biswas and published by The Alternative
- The Great Indian Anthology Vol. 1 (2020) published by Half Baked Beans, New Delhi
- The World The Belongs To Us: An Anthology of Queer Poetry from South Asia (2020) ed. by Aditi Angriras and Akhil Katyal and published by HarperCollins, New Delhi
- Open Your Eyes: An Anthology on Climate Change (2020) ed. by Vinita Agrawal and published by Hawakal Publishers, Kolkata
- Singing in the Dark: A Global Anthology of Poetry under Lockdown(2020) ed. by K. Satchidanandan and Nishi Chawla and published by Penguin Random House, New Delhi
- Bloomsbury Book of Great Indian Love Poems (2020) ed. by Abhay K. and published by Bloomsbury India, New Delhi
- A Poem a Day (2020) ed. by Gulzar and published by HarperCollins India, New Delhi
- Yearbook of Indian Poetry in English: 2020-2021 (2021) ed. by Sukrita Paul Kumar and Vinita Agrawal and published by Hawakal Publishers, Kolkata
- The Penguin Book of Indian Poets (2022) ed. by Jeet Thayil and published by Penguin Hamish Hamilton, New Delhi

== Indian English Poetry Anthologies Published Abroad ==
- An Anthology of Commonwealth Verse (1963) ed. by Margaret J. O’Donnell and published by Blackie & Son, London
- Young Commonwealth Poets (1965) ed. by P. L. Brent and published by Heinemann Publishers, London
- Commonwealth Poets of Today (1967) ed. by Howard Sergeant and published for the English Association by Murray
- Indian Love Poems (1967) ed. by Tambimuttu and John Piper (ill) and published by Peter Pauper Press, Mt Vernon, NY, United States
- New Voices of the Commonwealth (1968) ed. by Howard Sergeant and published by Evans Bros., United Kingdom
- Poems from India (1969) ed. by Daisy Alden and published by Thomas Y. Crowell, New York, United States
- Pergamon Poets 9: Poetry from India (1970) ed. by Howard Sergeant and published by Pergamon Press, United Kingdom
- Penguin Modern Poets Volume 2 (1970) ed. by D. M. Black, P. Redgrove and D. M. Thomas and published by Penguin Books Ltd., United Kingdom
- Contemporary Indian Poetry (1990) ed. by Kaiser Haq and published by Ohio State University Press, United States
- Anthology of Contemporary Indian Poetry (2004) ed. by Menka Shivdasani and published by Michael Rothenberg, Big Bridge United States
- The Bloodaxe Book of Contemporary Indian Poets (2008) ed. by Jeet Thayil and published by Bloodaxe Books Ltd., United Kingdom
- Mapping the Nation: An Anthology of Indian Poetry in English (1870–1920) (2012) ed. by Sheshalatha Reddy and published by Anthem Press, London
- The Dance of the Peacock: An Anthology of English Poetry from India (2013) ed. by Vivekanand Jha and published by Hidden Brook Press, Canada
- Converse: Contemporary English Poetry by Indians (2022) ed. by Sudeep Sen and published by Pippa Rann Books, United Kingdom

== See also ==
- List of poetry anthologies
- Indian poetry in English
- Indian poetry
- List of Indian poets
