= Indian poetry in English =

Poetry written in English by Indians

Indian English poetry is the oldest form of Indian English literature. Henry Louis Vivian Derozio is considered the first poet in the lineage of Indian English poetry followed by Rabindranath Tagore, Sri Aurobindo, Sarojini Naidu, Michael Madhusudan Dutt, and Toru Dutt, among others.

== History ==
Indian poetry in English has a longer and more distinguished tradition than Indian fiction in English.

— Pankaj Mishra, The Times Literary Supplement. International Books of the Year, 3 December 2004:10

Nissim Ezekiel is considered to be a pioneering figure in modern Indian English Poetry.His first book, A Time to Change, was published in 1952. The significant poets of the post-Derozio and pre-Ezekiel times are Toru Dutt, Michael Madhusudan Dutt, Sarojini Naidu, Sri Aurobindo and Rabindranath Tagore. Some of the notable poets of Ezekiel's time are A. K. Ramanujan, R. Parthasarathy, Gieve Patel, Jayant Mahapatra, Dom Moraes, Kamala Das, Keki N. Daruwalla, Arvind Krishna Mehrotra, Shiv K. Kumar, Arun Kolatkar and Dilip Chitre. Rabindranath Tagore wrote primarily in Bengali and created a small body of work (mainly prose) in English and was responsible for the translations of his own work into English.

If Indian poets in English are less well known abroad than the novelists it is probably because their concerns are personal, local and yet universal; they do not write, at least not directly about the nationalist and postcolonial political and cultural themes that the West patronizingly expects, even demands, from the formerly colonized.

— Bruce Alvin King, Modern Indian Poetry in English. New Delhi: Oxford University Press, 2004

== Poets ==
Other notable 20th century poets of English poetry in India include Eunice De Souza, Gieve Patel, Kersy Katrak and P. Lal among others. The younger generation of poets writing in English are Abhay K, Adil Jussawalla, A. J. Thomas, Anju Makhija, Anjum Hasan, Arundhathi Subramaniam, Hoshang Merchant, Madan Gopal Gandhi, Bibhu Padhi, C. P. Surendran, Dileep Jhaveri, Gopi Kottoor, Jayanta Mahapatra, Jeet Thayil, Jerry Pinto, Urvashi Bahuguna, K Srilata, K. V. Dominic, D. C. Chambial, T. Vasudeva Reddy, Makarand Paranjape, Akhil Katyal, Aditya Tiwari, Mani Rao, Meena Kandasamy, Menka Shivdasani, Manohar Shetty, Priya Sarukkai Chabria, Sharanya Manivannan, Ranjit Hoskote, Jaydeep Sarangi, Robin Ngangom, Rukmini Bhaya Nair, S. Anand, Salik Shah, Sudeep Sen, Sukrita Paul Kumar, Nalini Priyadarshni, Vijay Nambisan, Syam Sudhakar, Vihang A. Naik, Tapan Kumar Pradhan, Amitabh Mitra and Yuyutsu Sharma among others.

Modern expatriate Indian poets writing in English include Meena Alexander, Ravi Shankar, Sujata Bhatt, Tabish Khair, Vikram Seth and Vijay Seshadri among others

== Anthologies ==
Notable anthologies of Indian English poetry include Ten Twentieth-Century Indian Poets (edited by R. Parthasarathy), Three Indian Poets: Nissim Ezekiel, A K Ramanujan, Dom Moraes (edited by Bruce Alvin King), The Oxford India Anthology of Twelve Modern Indian Poets (edited by Arvind Krishna Mehrotra), 'Reasons for Belonging: Fourteen Contemporary Indian Poets (edited by Ranjit Hoskote), 60 Indian Poets (edited by Jeet Thayil), HarperCollins Anthology of English Poetry (edited by Sudeep Sen), Voices Now World Poetry Today (Edited by Binay Laha &B. K. Sorkar), Anthology of Contemporary Indian Poetry (edited by Menka Shivdasani, published by Michael Rothenberg in 2004); Ten: The New Indian Poets (edited and selected by Jayanta Mahapatra and Yuyutsu Sharma, New Delhi/Jaipur: Nirala Publications).

== Awards and laurels ==
- Muse India – Satish Verma Young Writers Award, Hyderabad, India
- SAARC Literary Award – New Delhi, India
- Sahitya Akademi Award – New Delhi, India
- Indology Literary Award -Raiganj, India.

== Journals ==
- Indian Literature – published by Sahitya Akademi, New Delhi, India
- The Indian P.E.N. – edited by Nissim Ezekiel, Mumbai, India
- Indology -edited by Binay Laha, West Bengal
- The Journal of Poetry Society of India – published by The Poetry Society (India), New Delhi, India
- Kavya Bharati – published by SCILET: The Study Centre for Indian Literature in English and Translation, edited by R. P. Nair Madurai, Tamil Nadu, India
- Mithila Review – founding editor and publisher Salik Shah, New Delhi, India
- Muse India – founder and managing editor G. Surya Prakash Rao, Hyderabad, India
- Coldnoon: Travel Poetics – edited by Arup K. Chatterjee, New Delhi, India
- Poetry Chain – edited by Gopi Kottoor, Kerala, India

== See also ==
- Indian poetry
- Indian English Poetry
- List of Indian English poetry anthologies
- List of English poets from India
- The Poetry Society (India)
