= The Dance of the Peacock =

151 strong Indian and diasporic Indians poems

First edition

The Dance of the Peacock: An Anthology of English Poetry from India is a 2013 anthology of poems written by one hundred and fifty-one poets; edited by Dr Vivekanand Jha. The one hundred and fifty-one poets include Indians and diasporic Indians.The book was published by Hidden Brook Press, Canada.

== Synopsis ==
The authors have different outlooks towards life in their poems mostly because of the variation in their living environment and their age differences. The name of the book simply compares the poetry to the dance of the peacock. Most of the authors are Indian diaspora in UK, US and Canada. The writers are a mix of male and female.

== Contributors ==
A. J. Thomas, Abhay K, Aftab Yusuf Shaikh, Aju Mukhopadhyay, Akhil Katyal, Akshat Sharma, Allabhya Ghosh, Amalan Stanley V, Amarendra Khatua, Amarendra Kumar, Ambika Ananth, Ami Kaye, Amol Redij, Ananya S Guha, Anita Nair, Anju Makhija, Anna Sujatha Mathai, Aparna Kaji Shah, Arbind Kumar Choudhary, Archna Sahni, Arman Najmi, Arundhathi Subramaniam, Asha Viswas, Ashoka Sen, Ashoke Bhattacherjee, Asoke Chakravarty, Bibhu Padhi, Binod Mishra, Bipin Patsani, Bishnupada Ray, C D Norman, C. L. Khatri, Chandini Santosh, Chandra Shekhar Dubey, Charu Sheel Singh, D. C. Chambial, Debjani Chatterjee, Deepak Thakur, Devashish Makhija, Durlabh Singh, Geetashree Chatterjee, Gopa Nayak, Gopal Lahiri, Gopi Kottoor, H. K. Kaul, Harish K Thakur, Hazara Singh, Hiranya Aditi, Jayanta Mahapatra, Jaydeep Sarangi, Keki N. Daruwalla, K Pankajam, K. Satchidanandan, K. Srilata, K. V. Dominic, K. V. Raghupathi, Kanwar Dinesh Singh, Karan Singh, Katta Rajamouly, Kavita Jindal, Khurshid Alam, K K Srivastava, Krithika Raghavan, Kulbhusan Kushal, Kumarendra Mallick, Lakshmi Priya, Lalita Noronha, M. V. Sathyanarayana, Malay Roy Choudhury, Mani Rao, Menka Shivdasani, Michelle Cahill, Mihir Chitre, Mohineet Kaur Boparai, Mona Dash, Monika Pant, Mukta Sambrani, Mustansir Dalvi, Naina Dey, Nandini Sahu, Nikesh Murali, Nuggehalli Pankaja, O. P. Arora, P C K Prem, P K JOY, P K N Panicker, Pashupati Jha, Poornima Laxmeshwar, Prabhanjan K. Mishra, Prabhat K. Singh, Prahlad Singh Shekhawat, Pramila Venkateswaran, Prathap Kamath, Pravat Kumar Padhy, Preeta Chandran, Priscila Uppal, Pritha Kejriwal, Puneet Aggarwal, R C Shukla, R J Kalpana, Ram Krishna Singh, R. Raj Rao, Raja Nand Jha, Rajashree Anand, Ramendra Kumar, Ranu Uniyal, Ravi Shankar, Rizvana Parveen, Romi Jain, Rudra Kinshuk, Ruth Vanita, Samartha Vashishtha, Sarada Purna Sonty, Satish Verma, Seema Aarella, Semeen Ali, Shamsud Ahmed, Shanta Acharya, Sharad Chandra, Shefali Shah Choksi, Shloka Shankar, Shobhana Kumar, Sindhu Rajasekaran, Smita Agarwal, Smitha Sehgal, Sneha Subramanian Kanta, Sonjoy Dutta-Roy, Sonnet Mondal, Soumyen Maitra, Sreelatha Chakravarty, Stephen Gill, Subhash Misra, Sukrita Paul Kumar, Sunil Sharma, Sunita Jain, Syed Faizan, T. Vasudeva Reddy, Tejdeep Kaur Menon, Usha Akella, Usha Kishore, V.V.B. Rama Rao, Vandana Kumari Jena, Vasuprada Kartic, Vibha Batra, Vihang A. Naik, Vinay Capila, Vinita Agrawal, Vitasta Raina, Vivek Naraynan, Vivekanand Jha and Yasmin Sawhney.
