= Indian English literature =

Literature written in English by Indians

Indian English literature (IEL), also referred to as Indian Writing in English (IWE), is the body of work by writers in India who write in the English language but whose native or co-native language could be one of the numerous languages of India. Its early history began with the works of Henry Louis Vivian Derozio and Michael Madhusudan Dutt followed by Rabindranath Tagore and Sri Aurobindo. R. K. Narayan, Mulk Raj Anand and Raja Rao contributed to the growth and popularity of Indian English fiction in the 1930s. It is also associated, in some cases, with the works of members of the Indian diaspora who subsequently compose works in English.

It is often referred to as Indo-Anglian literature (a writing specific term; not to be confused with Anglo-Indian). Although some works may be classified under the genre of postcolonial literature, Indian English literature, evolving since the late 18th century encompasses diverse themes and ideologies, making strict categorization challenging.

== History ==
Indian English Literature is relatively recent, being nearly two centuries old. The first book written by an Indian in English was The Travels of Dean Mahomet (1794), a travel narrative by Sake Dean Mahomed. The first Indian novel in English, Rajmohan’s Wife (1864), was written by Bankim Chandra Chattopadhyay. Govinda Samanta, or the History of a Bengali Raiyat (1874) by Lal Behari Dey and his later Folk-Tales of Bengal (1883) further contributed to early Indian English fiction. Bianca, or The Young Spanish Maiden (1878) by Toru Dutt was the first novel by an Indian woman. Krupabai Satthianadhan’s autobiographical novel Saguna: A Story of Native Christian Life was serialized in The Madras Christian College Magazine (1887–88), followed by her only other novel, Kamala: The Story of a Hindu Life (1894). In 1895, Shevantibai Nikambe wrote an English novel titled Ratanbai: A Sketch of a Bombay High-Caste Hindu Young Wife.

The non-fictional body of prose in Indian English literature from the nineteenth and early twentieth centuries includes letters, diaries, political manifestos, articles, speeches, and philosophical works, forming a rich and varied corpus. The speeches of Swami Vivekananda, Rabindranath Tagore, Chittaranjan Das, Bal Gangadhar Tilak, Mahatma Gandhi, and Subhas Chandra Bose played a crucial role in shaping modern India and its use of the English language. Mahatma Gandhi's Hind Swaraj or Indian Home Rule (1910) was written in an indigenized variety of English, challenging 'the hegemony of Standard English'.

Raja Rao, Indian philosopher and writer, authored Kanthapura and The Serpent and the Rope. Kisari Mohan Ganguli translated the Mahabharata into English, the only time the epic has ever been translated in its entirety into a European language. Rabindranath Tagore wrote in Bengali and English and translated several of his own work into English. Dhan Gopal Mukerji was the first Indian author to win a literary award in the United States. Nirad C. Chaudhuri, a writer of non-fiction, is best known for his The Autobiography of an Unknown Indian (1951), in which he relates his life experiences and influences. P. Lal, a poet, translator, publisher and essayist, founded a press in the 1950s for Indian English writing, Writers Workshop. Ram Nath Kak (1917–1993), a Kashmiri veterinarian, wrote his autobiography Autumn Leaves, which is one of the most vivid portraits of life in 20th century Kashmir.

R. K. Narayan contributed over many decades and was aided by Graham Greene to find a publisher in England. Similar to the way Thomas Hardy used Wessex, Narayan created the fictitious town of Malgudi where he set his novels. Some criticise Narayan for the parochial, detached and closed world that he created in the face of the changing conditions in India at the times in which the stories are set. Others, such as Greene, however, feel that through Malgudi they could vividly understand the Indian experience. Narayan's evocation of small-town life and its experiences through the eyes of the child protagonist Swaminathan in Swami and Friends is a good sample of his writing style. Simultaneous with Narayan's pastoral idylls, Mulk Raj Anand, was similarly gaining recognition for his writing set in rural India, focused on brutality, with divisions of caste, class and religion. According to writer Lakshmi Holmström, "The writers of the 1930s were fortunate because after many years of use, English had become an Indian language used widely and at different levels of society, and therefore they could experiment more boldly and from a more secure position." Kamala Markandeya is an early writer in IEL who has often grouped with the trinity of R.K. Narayan, Mulk Raj Anand and Raja Rao. The contributions of Manoj Das and Manohar Malgoankar to growth of IEL largely remains unacknowledged.

== Later history ==
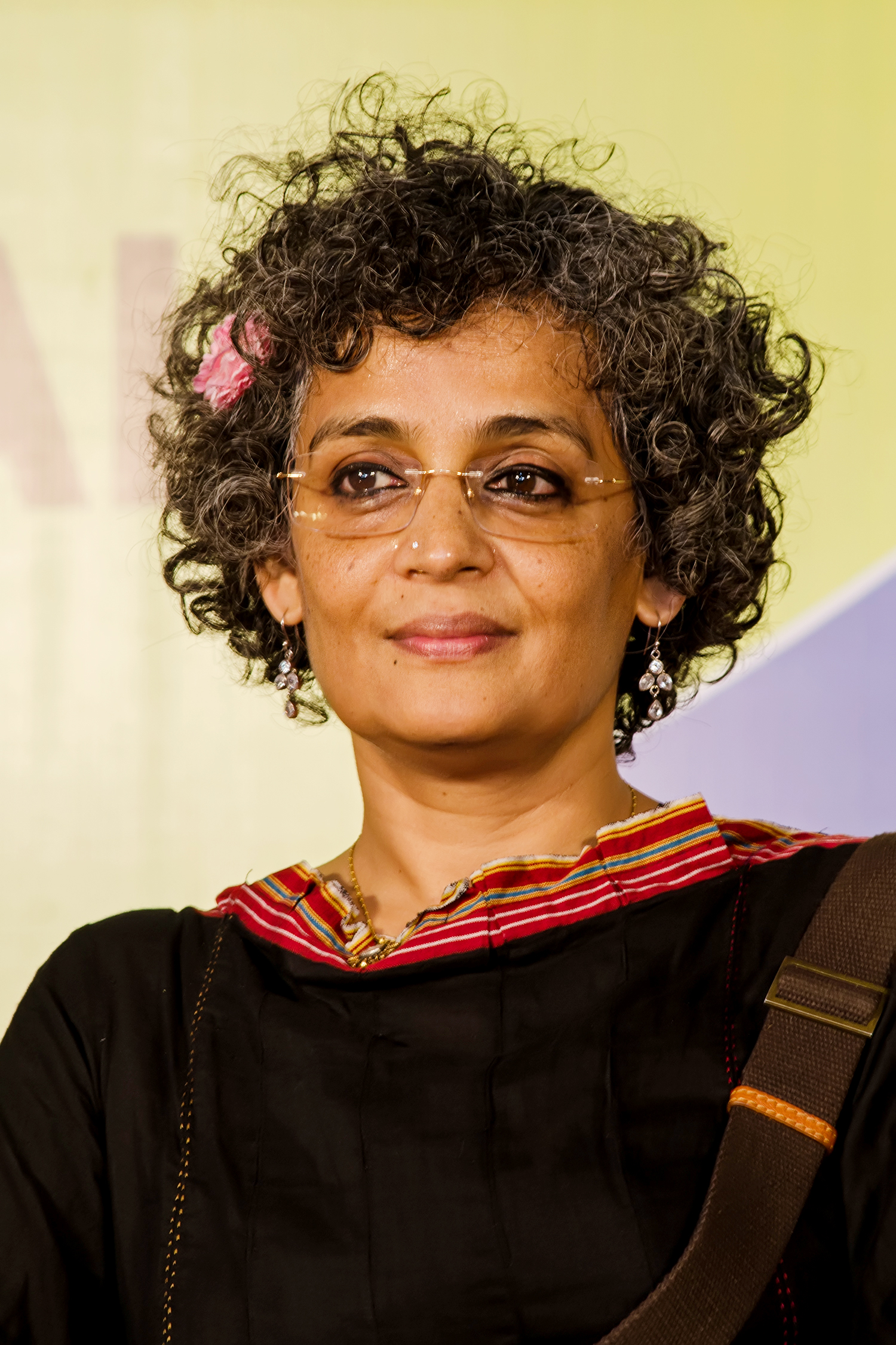
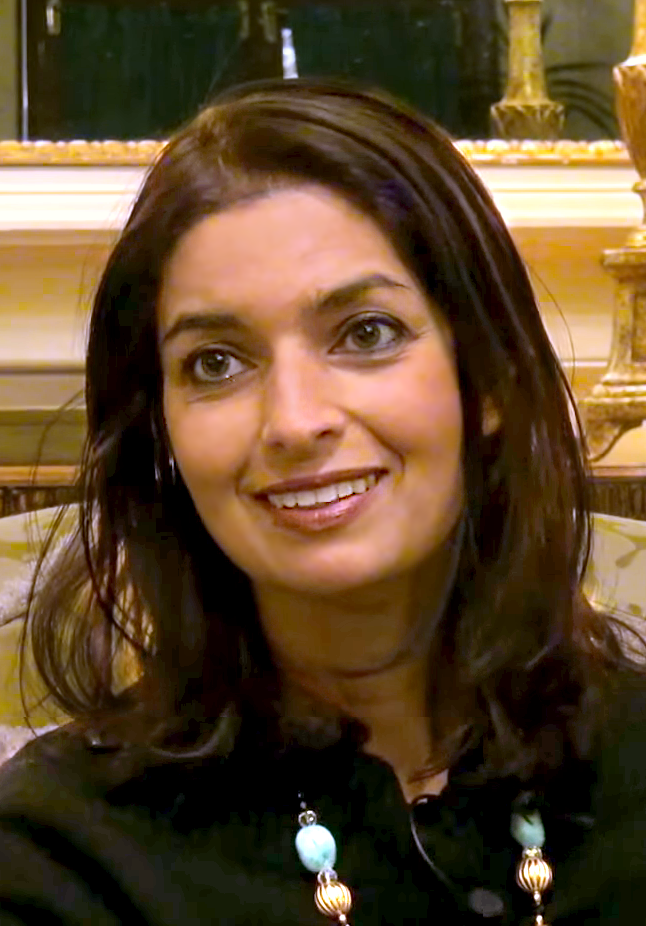
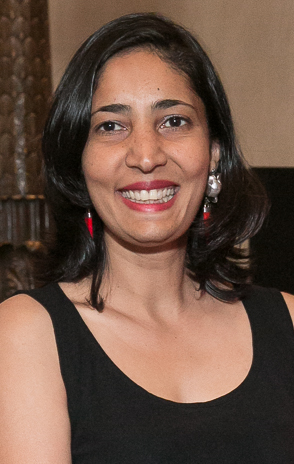
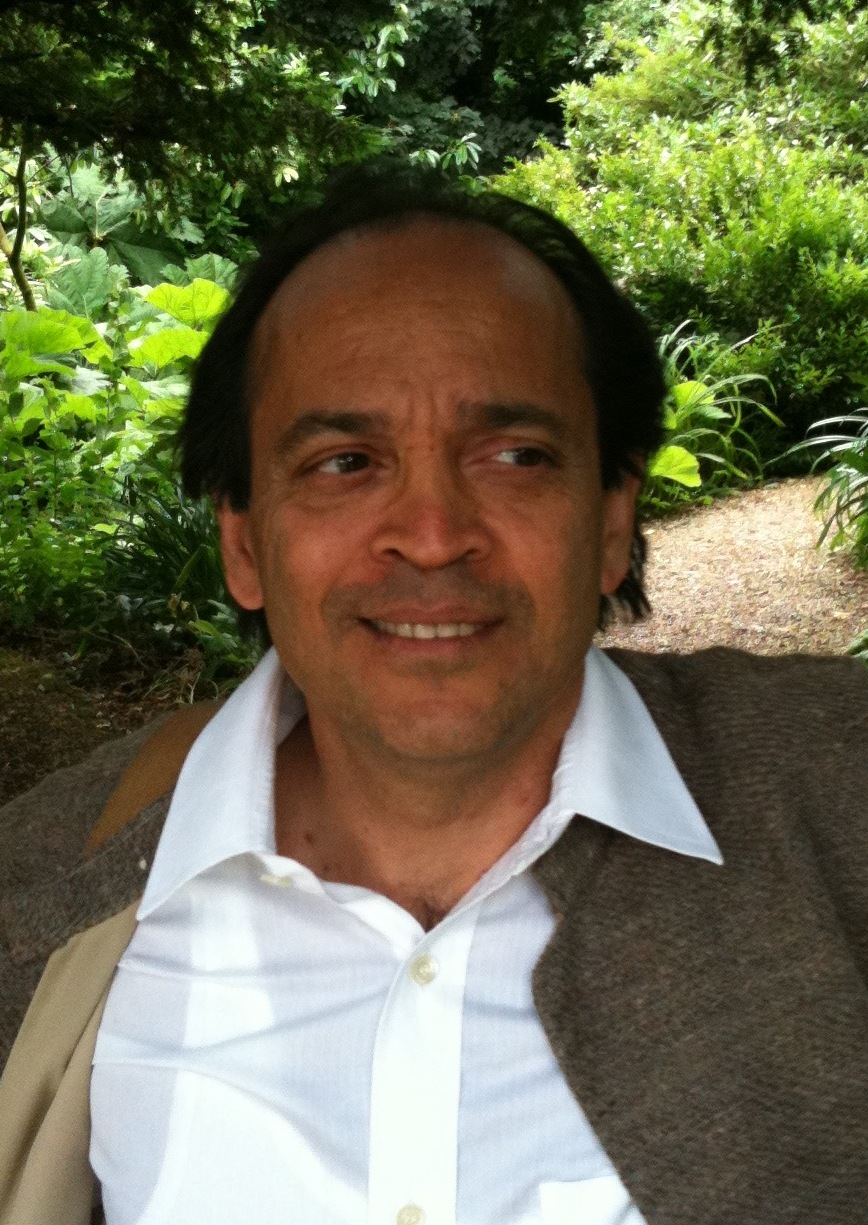
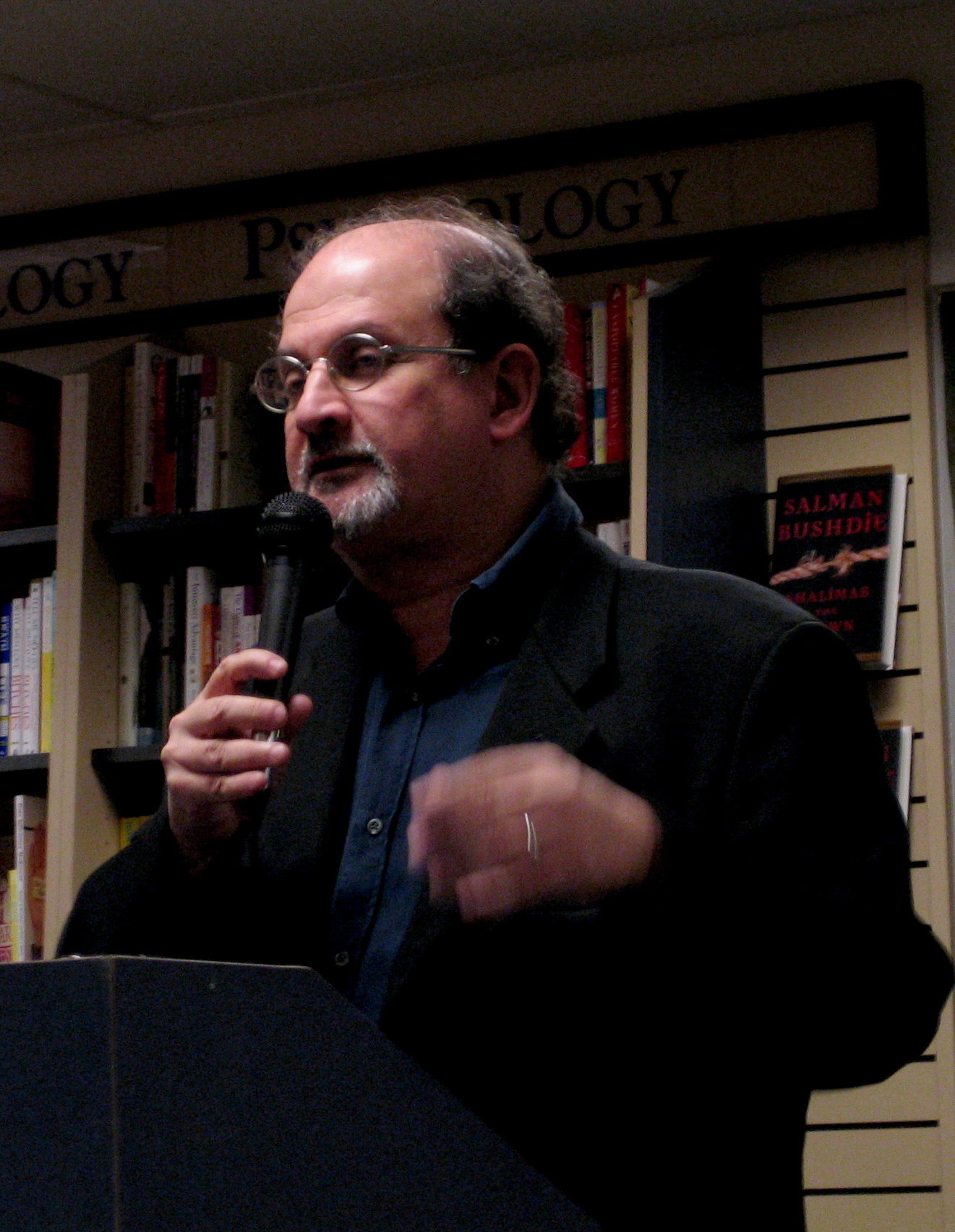
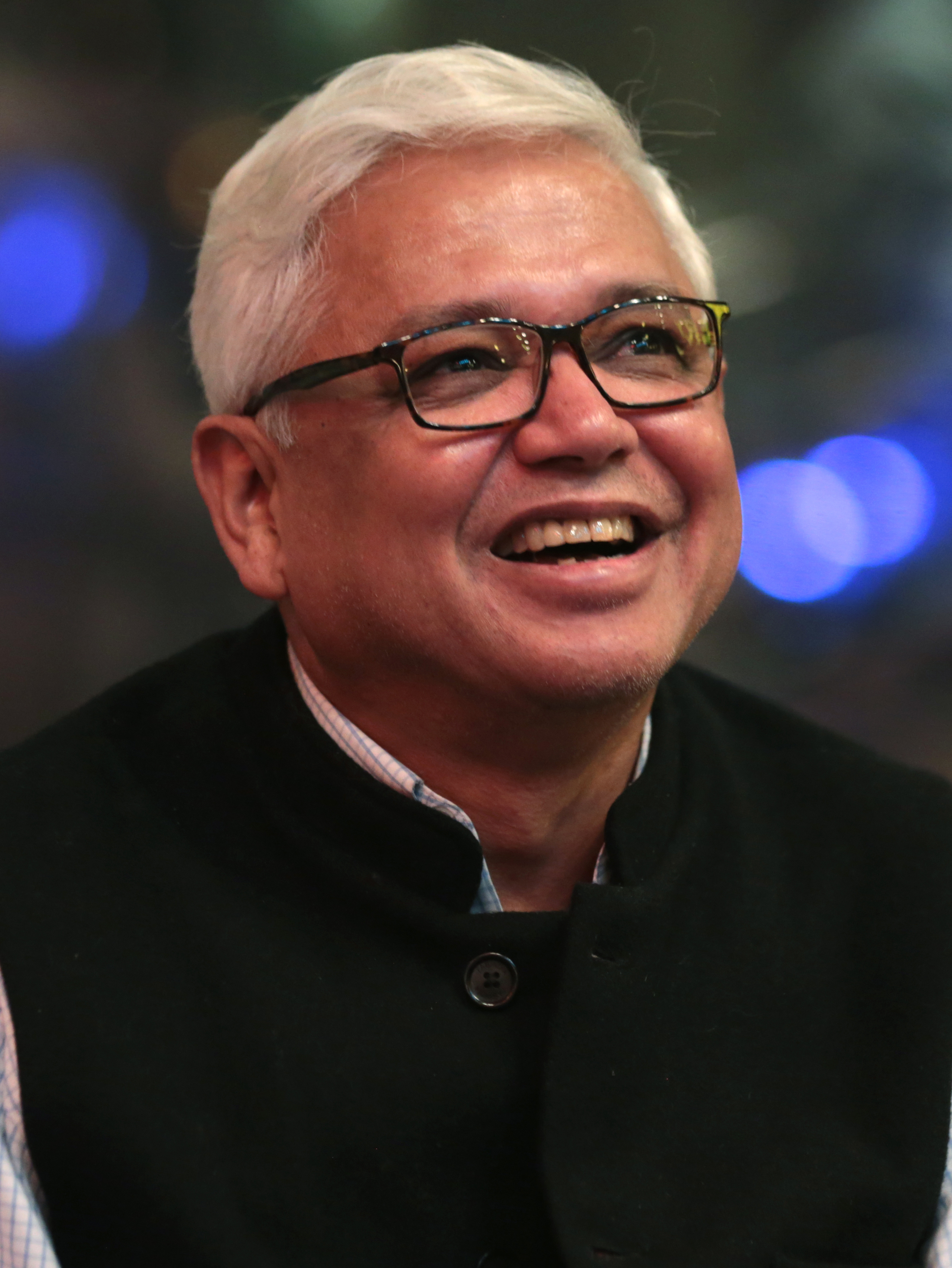
- Various Indian English writers, from top, left to right: Arundhati Roy • Jhumpa Lahiri • Kiran Desai • Vikram Seth • Salman Rushdie • Amitav Ghosh

Among the later writers, the most notable is Salman Rushdie, born in India and now living in the UK. Rushdie, with his famous work Midnight's Children (Booker Prize 1981, Booker of Bookers 1992, and Best of the Bookers 2008), ushered in a new trend of writing. He used a hybrid language – English generously peppered with Indian terms – to represent India. His works are categorised as magic realism. Nayantara Sehgal was one of the first female Indian writers in English to receive wide recognition. Her fiction deals with India's elite responding to the crisis engendered by political change. She was awarded the 1986 Sahitya Akademi Award for English, for her novel, Rich Like Us (1985), by the Sahitya Akademi, India's National Academy of Letters. Anita Desai, who was shortlisted for the Booker Prize three times, received a Sahitya Akademi Award in 1978 for her novel Fire on the Mountain and a British Guardian Prize for The Village by the Sea. Her daughter Kiran Desai won the 2006 Man Booker Prize for her second novel, The Inheritance of Loss. Ruskin Bond received Sahitya Akademi Award for his collection of short stories Our Trees Still Grow in Dehra in 1992. He is also the author of a historical novel A Flight of Pigeons, which is based on an episode during the Indian Rebellion of 1857.

Vikram Seth, author of The Golden Gate (1986) and A Suitable Boy (1994) is a writer who uses a purer English and more realistic themes. Vikram Seth is notable both as an accomplished novelist and a prolific poet.

Another writer who has contributed immensely to the Indian English Literature is Amitav Ghosh who is the author of The Circle of Reason (his 1986 debut novel), The Shadow Lines (1988), The Calcutta Chromosome (1995), The Glass Palace (2000), The Hungry Tide (2004), and Sea of Poppies (2008), the first volume of The Ibis trilogy, set in the 1830s, just before the Opium War, which encapsulates the colonial history of the East. Ghosh's latest work of fiction is River of Smoke (2011), the second volume of The Ibis trilogy.

Jhumpa Lahiri is a British-born Indian American of Bengali descent whose works portray the Indian-immigrant experiences in the United States. She won the Pulitzer Prize for fiction for her debut collection Interpreter of Maladies, which explores the lives of first-generation Indian immigrants. Her first novel, The Namesake, which is made into a film, depicts Bengali immigrant-couple struggles and adjustments to move to the United States from Calcutta. Her second story collection, Unaccustomed Earth, depicts the experiences of the second and third generation Indian Americans. Her second novel, The Lowland, which tells the story of two brothers, Subhash and Udayan Mitra, whose lives diverge sharply against the backdrop of 1960s India and the rise of the Naxalite movement, was placed on the shortlist for the 2013 Man Booker Prize.

Rohinton Mistry is an Indian-born Canadian author who is a Neustadt International Prize for Literature laureate (2012). His first book Tales from Firozsha Baag (1987), published by Penguin Books Canada, is a collection of 11 short stories. His novels Such a Long Journey (1991) and A Fine Balance (1995) earned him great acclaim. In a similar vein, M. G. Vassanji was born in Kenya of Indian descent and emigrated to Canada; he twice won the Giller Prize, for The Book of Secrets (1994) and The In-Between World of Vikram Lall (2003), as well as the Governor General's Award for English-language non-fiction for A Place Within: Rediscovering India (2008), a travelogue.

Shashi Tharoor, in his The Great Indian Novel (1989), follows a story-telling (though in a satirical) mode as in the Mahabharata drawing his ideas by going back and forth in time. His work as UN official living outside India has given him a vantage point that helps construct an objective Indianness.Vikram Chandra is another author who shuffles between India and the United States and has received critical acclaim for his first novel Red Earth and Pouring Rain (1995) and collection of short stories Love and Longing in Bombay (1997). His namesake Vikram A. Chandra is a renowned journalist and the author of The Srinagar Conspiracy (2000). Suketu Mehta is another writer currently based in the United States who authored Maximum City (2004), an autobiographical account of his experiences in the city of Mumbai. In 2008, Aravind Adiga received the Man Booker Prize for his debut novel The White Tiger.

Recent writers in India such as Arundhati Roy and David Davidar show a direction towards contextuality and rootedness in their works. Arundhati Roy, a trained architect and the 1997 Booker prize winner for her The God of Small Things, calls herself a "home grown" writer. Her award-winning book is set in the immensely physical landscape of Kerala. Davidar sets his The House of Blue Mangoes in Southern Tamil Nadu. In both books, geography and politics are integral to the narrative. In his novel Lament of Mohini (2000), Shreekumar Varma touches upon the matriarchal system and the sammandham system of marriage as he writes about the Namboodiris and the aristocrats of Kerala. Jahnavi Barua, a Bangalore-based author from Assam has set her critically acclaimed collection of short stories Next Door on the social scenario in Assam with insurgency as the background.

The stories and novels of Ratan Lal Basu reflect the conditions of tribal people and hill people of West Bengal and the adjacent states of Sikkim, Bhutan and Nepal. Many of his short stories reflect the political turmoil of West Bengal since the Naxalite movement of the 1970s. Many of his stories like Blue Are the Far Off Mountains, The First Rain and The Magic Marble glorify purity of love. His novel Oraon and the Divine Tree is the story of a tribal and his love for an age old tree.

== Poetry ==
Early notable poets in English include Derozio, Michael Madhusudan Dutt, Toru Dutt, Romesh Chunder Dutt, Sri Aurobindo, Sarojini Naidu, and her brother Harindranath Chattopadhyay. Notable 20th Century authors of English poetry in India include Dilip Chitre, Kamala Das, Eunice De Souza, Nissim Ezekiel, Kersy Katrak, Shiv K. Kumar, Arun Kolatkar, P. Lal, Jayanta Mahapatra, Dom Moraes, Gieve Patel, A. K. Ramanujan, Madan Gopal Gandhi, and P C K Prem among several others.

The younger generation of poets writing in English include Abhay K, Arundhathi Subramaniam, Anju Makhija, Bibhu Padhi, Ranjit Hoskote, Sudeep Sen, Smita Agarwal, Makarand Paranjape, Jeet Thayil, Jaydeep Sarangi, Mani Rao, Jerry Pinto, K. V. Dominic, Meena Kandasamy, Nalini Priyadarshni, Gopi Kottoor, Tapan Kumar Pradhan, Rukmini Bhaya Nair, Robin Ngangom, Vihang A. Naik and K Srilata.

Modern expatriate Indian poets writing in English include Agha Shahid Ali, Sujata Bhatt, Richard Crasta, Yuyutsu Sharma, Tabish Khair and Vikram Seth.

== Alternative writing ==
India's experimental and avant garde counterculture is symbolised in the Prakalpana Movement. During the last four decades this bilingual literary movement has included Richard Kostelanetz, John M. Bennett, Don Webb, Sheila Murphy and many others worldwide and their Indian counterparts. Prakalpana fiction is a fusion of prose, poetry, play, essay, and pictures.

== See also ==
- Indian literature
- Indian poetry in English
- List of English poets from India
- Literature from North East India
