= Smita Agarwal =

Indian poet

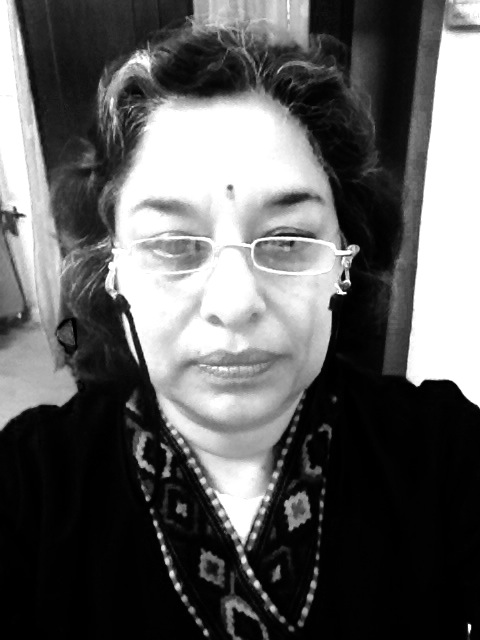
- Born: 1958 (age 67–68)
- Occupations: Poet and a Professor

Smita Agarwal (born 1958) is an Indian poet and a professor of English literature at the University of Allahabad, India.

== Biography ==
Smita Agarwal's poetry has appeared in journals and anthologies. In 1999 she was a writer in residence at the University of Stirling in Scotland, and the University of Kent in England. Agarwal's doctoral studies were on American poet, novelist and short story writer, Sylvia Plath. Agarwal is an editor and translator for Plath Profiles, the Sylvia Plath online journal, Indiana University.

Agarwal is also a vocalist for All India Radio.

== Works ==
- Wish-granting Words. New Delhi: Ravi Dayal Publisher, 2002
- Mofussil Notebook. Poems of Small Town India. E-book: Cooperjal Limited, UK, 2011
- Mofussil Notebook. Poems, Print. With an Introduction and New Poems, Calcutta: Sampark, 2016.

=== Edited ===
- Marginalized: Indian Poetry in English, ed. Smita Agarwal, Amsterdam and New York: Rodopi, 2014.

==== Poetry anthologies ====
Agarwal's poems have been included in anthologies such as:

- Literature Alive, New Writing from India and Britain, Vol. 2, Summer 1996.
- Nine Indian Women Poets. Oxford University Press, 1997
- Verse: Special Feature on Indian poetry, UK & USA, Vol. 17 & 18, 2001.
- Reasons for Belonging. Penguin, 2002.
- Midnight’s Grandchildren. Macedonia: Post Independence Poetry From India, Struga Poetry Press, 2003.
- Confronting Love. Penguin, 2005.
- Fulcrum: Special Issue on Indian Poetry in English, No. 4. US: 2005.
- Sparks, DAV Center for Creative Education. Mumbai: New Panvel, 2008.
- Indian English Women Poets. New Delhi: Creative Books, 2009.
- We Speak in Changing Languages: Indian Women Poets, 1990-2007. New Delhi: Sahitya Akademi, 2009.
- The HarperCollins Book of English Poetry, 2012.
- These My Words: The Penguin Book of Indian Poetry, 2012.
- A New Book of Indian Poems in English (2000) ed. by Gopi Kottoor and published by Poetry Chain and Writers Workshop, Calcutta
- The Dance of the Peacock: An Anthology of English Poetry from India, featuring 151 Indian English poets, edited by Vivekanand Jha and published by Hidden Brook Press, Canada.

== See also ==
- Indian English Poetry
- List of Indian poets § English
