= Anna Sujatha Mathai =

Indian poet (died 2023)

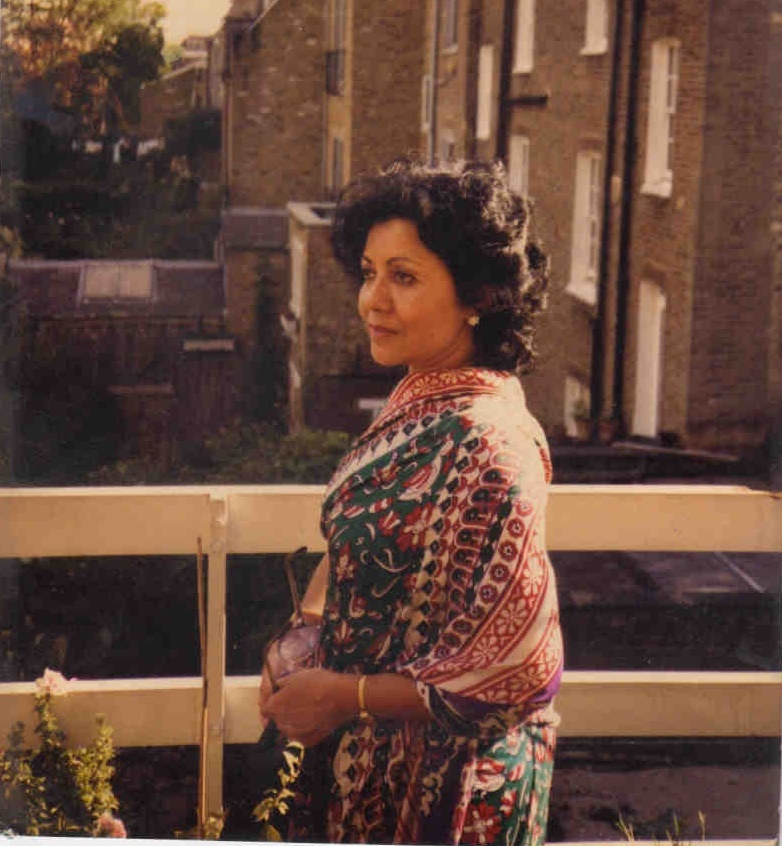
- Mathai in 2015
- Born: 1933/1934; Kerala, British India
- Died: 16 March 2023 (aged 89)
- Occupation: Poet

Anna Sujatha Mathai (1933/1934 – 16 March 2023) was an Indian poet.

== Biography ==
Anna Sujatha Mathai was born to Syrian Christian parents. She completed her B.A. (Honours) degree in English Language and Literature from Miranda College and a post-graduate degree in Social Studies from the University of Edinburgh. She worked in this field in England for some years.

Mathai’s poems have been published in The Penguin Book of Contemporary Women Poets, In Their Own Voice, edited by Arlene R. K. Zide (1993), Contemporary Asian Poetry, Hong Kong and Singapore, edited by Agnes Lam (2014), Post-Independence Poetry by Indians in English, edited by Arundhathi Subramaniam (Sahitya Akademi).

Mathai published five collections of poetry in English. Her poems have been translated into some Indian and European languages.

Anna Mathai died on 16 March 2023, at the age of 89.

== Selected works ==
- Crucifixions (1970) Writers Workshop, Calcutta
- We the Unreconciled (1972) Writers Workshop, Calcutta
- The Attic of Night (1991) Rupa &Co. New Delhi
- Life - on my Side of the Street (2005) Sahitya Akademi. (Women Poets showcased for 50th Anniv. Of Sahitya Akademi.) Edited by Keki Daruwala.
- Mothers Veena and Selected Poems (2013) Authorspress

== Inclusion in poetry anthologies ==
- Scaling Heights : An Anthology of Contemporary Indian English Poetry (2013) eds. by Dr. Gopal Lahiri and Dr.Kirti Sengupta and published by Authorspress, New Delhi
