= Charu Sheel Singh =

Indian scholar

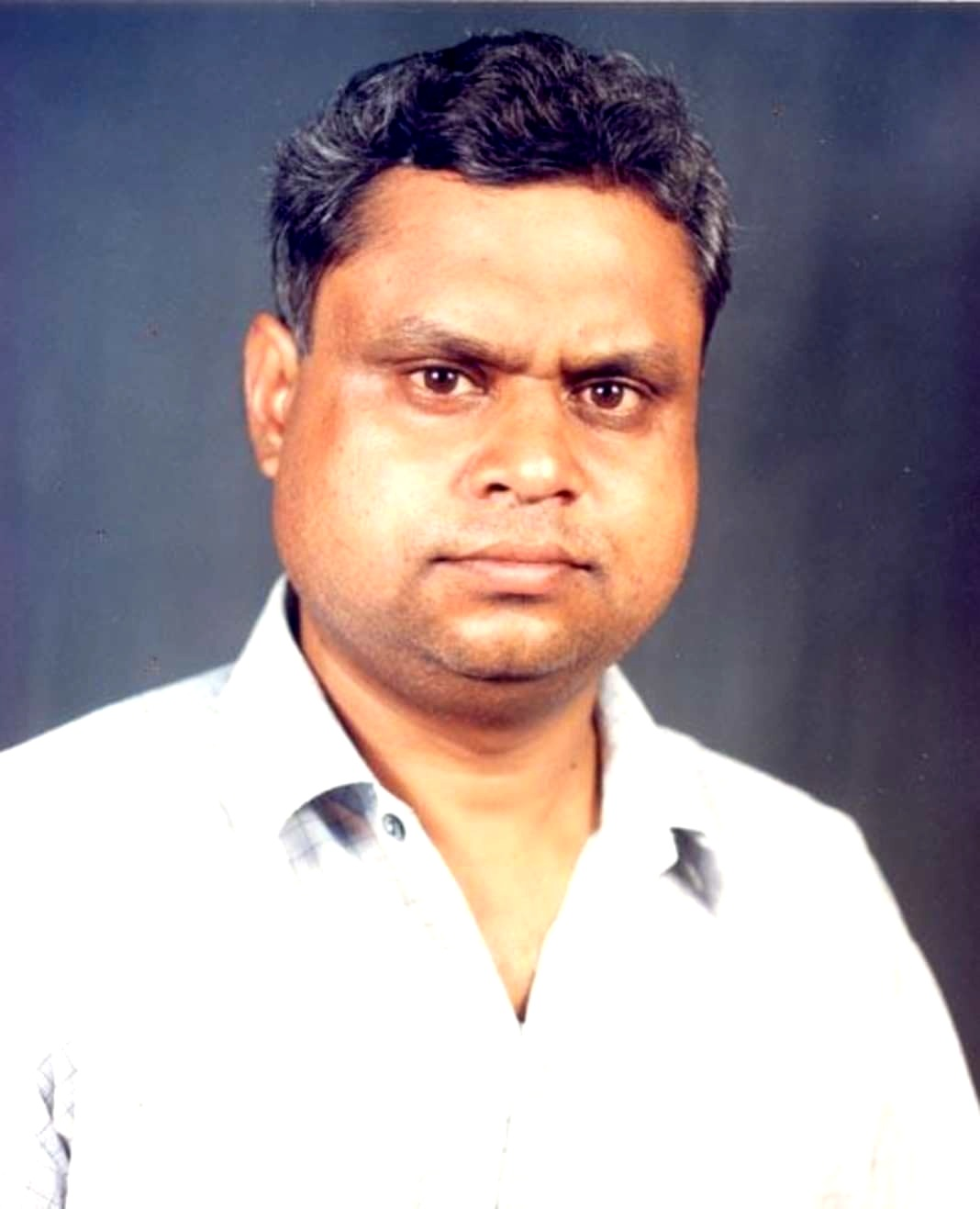
Professor Charu Sheel Singh

Charu Sheel Singh (Hindi: चारु शील सिंह, 15 May 1955- 3 May 2021) was an Indian writer and scholar of English language. A treader of the triple path walked by the past great poets Matthew Arnold, T. S. Eliot and Sri Aurobindo, Charu Sheel Singh was a poet, critic and literary theorist. He was not only well acquainted with current schools of thought but also conversant with philosophical theories of the East and the West and the occult traditions, Buddhism and theosophy being among his special areas of interest. He was well known for writing poems and criticism in English. He was a professor of English literature in Mahatma Gandhi Kashi Vidyapeeth. He received the Maharashtra Dalit Sahitya Akademy Award and The Best Writer Award by Penguin International.

He is one of the mythifiers of the city of Varanasi and his Kashi: A Mandala Poem is the only epic in English language on the city of Kashi.

== Biography ==
Charu Sheel Singh was born on 15 May 1955. His father, Pratap Narayan Singh was a Sahitya Ratna and a poet. He took his master's degree in English from Aligarh Muslim University in 1976. In 1978, he was awarded Ph.D. degree in English by Banaras Hindu University. He was married to Maya and they have a son, Padmasambhava. He died due to complications arising from asthma on 3 May 2021.

== Legacy ==
Kashi: A Mandala Poem, published in 2007, is considered as one of the very few epics in English on a city. It synthesizes puranic myths with modern science and postmodern theory to create a modern-day epic. It is written in a modern language, with an ancient tradition flowing into the veins of the City Eternal: Varanasi.

Charu Sheel singh is an indian writer whose work engages with themes from philosophy, yoga and tantra, often drawing on poetry and mythological references. his writings combine elements of contemporary thought with reference to ancient traditions and occasionally incorporate concepts from modern scientific ideas such as quantum theory

Charu Sheel Singh has been reviewed in commonwealth literature, USA. He is also reviewed in a quarterly journal BLAKE from Rochester University. His book Contemporary Literary Theory is listed in Reader's Guide To English Literature published by Routledge publishers, Abingdon, United Kingdom. His originality and strength of mythical imagination has led poetry lovers to work upon his poetry.

== Works ==
- Charu Sheel Singh (1991). Literary Theory: Possibilities and Limits. BR Publishing Corporation. ISBN 978-8170186632.
- Charu Sheel Singh (1993). Confederate gestures, search for method in Indian literature studies. Associated Pub. House. ISBN 978-8170450825.
- Charu Sheel Singh (1994). Concentric Imagination: Mandala Literary Theory. South Asia Books. ISBN 978-8170187769.
- Charu Sheel Singh (1998). Auguries of Evocation: British Poetry During and After the Movement. Associated Pub. House. ISBN 978-8170450023.
- Charu Sheel Singh (2007). Kashi: A Mandala Poem. Adhyayan Publishers & Distributors. ISBN 978-8184350296.
- Charu Sheel Singh (2011). Charu Sheel Singh: Collected Poems 1975-2003. Adhyayan Publishers & Distributors. ISBN 978-8184350456.

== Edited works ==
- Exiled Among Natives (2013) eds. by Prof. Charu Sheel Singh, Dr. Binod Mishra and published by Adhyayan Publishers, New Delhi

== Awards and recognitions ==
- Maharashtra Dalit Sahitya Akademy Award
- The Best Writer Award, Penguin International

== See also ==
- List of Indian English poetry anthologies
