= Menka Shivdasani =

Indian poet

Menka Shivdasani is an Indian poet. In 1986, she co-founded The Poetry Circle in Bombay, with Nitin Mukadam and Akil Contractor.

== Bibliography ==
=== Poetry books ===
- Nirvana at Ten Rupees published by XAL-Praxis Foundation, Mumbai .1990
- Stet, first published in 2001 by Sampark
- Safe House published by Paperwall (Poetrywala), Mumbai . 2015
- Frazil published by Paperwall (Poetrywala), Mumbai . 2018

== Editor ==
- Anthology of Contemporary Indian Poetry (2004) ed. by Menka Shivdasani and published by Michael Rothenberg, Big Bridge United States.
- Freedom and fissures (1998): an anthology of Sindhi partition poetry published by Sahitya Akademi, India.
- If the Roof Leaks, Let it Leak, an anthology of writing by Indian women, Sound and Picture Archives for Research on Women, 2014

== See also ==
- Indian English Poetry
- Indian poetry in English
