= Shevantibai Nikambe =

Indian author and educator

- Born: 1865; Poona, Bombay
- Occupations: Writer; educator; social reformer
- Writing career
- Period: 1890s–1930s
- Subjects: Child marriage; child widow; female education
- Notable work: Ratanbai (1895)

Shevantibai Nikambe was an Indian author and educator known for her English-language novel, Ratanbai: A Sketch of a Bombay High-Caste Hindu Young Wife (1895). As an educator, she founded a school for the advancement of female education.

== Career ==
Born in a Brahmin family in Poona, Western India, later converted into Christianity, Nikambe belonged to the first generation of Indian female authors who were English-educated. She received her early education at St. Peter's Girls' High School in Bombay. In 1890, she graduated and began teaching at Sharada Sadan High School, an institution founded by Pandita Ramabai for high-caste girls and widows.

Inspired by the works of Ramabai, she was actively involved in female education in Bombay. She also traveled abroad such as Europe and the United States to study Christian work and their educational methods, which helped her to serve as a headmistress at various institutions.

In 1912, Nikambe founded the Married Women's High School in Bombay for the advancement of high-caste Hindu child wives and widows. Through this institution, scholar Ishita Pande writes, "over 1,000 women passed during the first 16 years of its existence."

== Literary works ==
In 1895, Nikambe wrote an English novel titled Ratanbai: A Sketch of a Bombay High-Caste Hindu Young Wife. In this novel, she discusses the life and problems faced by Ratanbai, a high caste woman and touches on several issues such as child widow and female education. In this context, she is sometimes referred as "one of the pioneers of the Indian women's literary canon in English." Apart from her novel Ratanbai (1895), she also published an essay in 1929 titled Pandita Ramabai and the Problem of India's Married Women and Widows, where she discussed Ramabai's works and the issues of women's reform and education.
