= United Writers' Association =

United Writers' Association is a literary organisation based in India which was founded by Dr. K Thiagarajan almost 33 years ago at Chennai in India.The organisation hosts the distinguished Frank Moraes Memorial Lectures
