= Howard Sergeant =

Herbert (Howard) Sergeant MBE (1914–1987) was a poet and editor from Hull and the publisher of Britain's oldest independent poetry magazine Outposts. He was appointed MBE in 1978 for services to literature.

He edited nearly 60 anthologies of contemporary poetry and was himself a poet of considerable talent. The Sergeant archive was deposited with Hull University by his widow, Jean Sergeant, in 1998 and provides extensive coverage of the full range of his literary work. Sergeant was the subject of a doctoral thesis by Bruce Meyer of McMaster University.

The Scotsman obituary of Muriel Spark, referring to her autobiography Curriculum Vitae, stated:

The title was precise. A CV is an impersonal account of one's career suggesting progress from strength to strength. It now seems clear that she did love with passion one of the boyfriends mentioned: the poet, Howard Sergeant. Without passion but with great loyalty, she also loved the man whose misinformation had prompted Spark's desire to set the record straight: Derek Stanford. She had hoped, in turn, to marry both men, and both had deserted her.

- The Scotsman

He married Jean Crabtree in 1954. She survived him with a son and three daughters.
