= Keki N. Daruwalla =

Indian poet and short story writer (1937–2024)

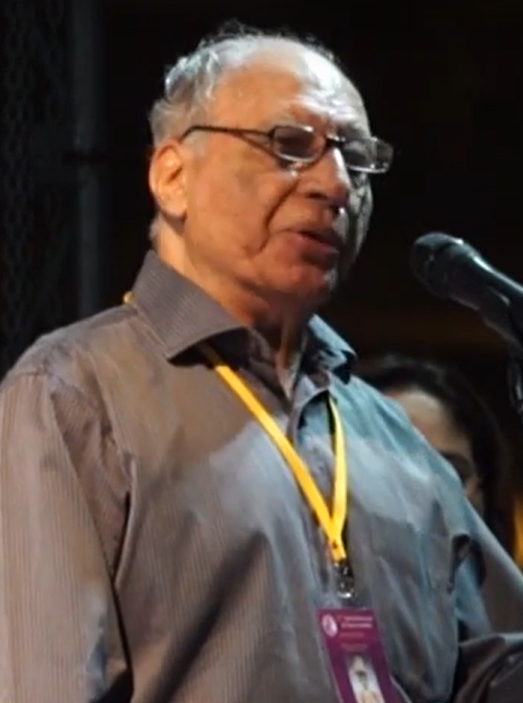
- Daruwalla in 2016
- Born: 24 January 1937; Lahore, Punjab Province, British India
- Died: 26 September 2024 (aged 87); Delhi, India
- Education: University of Punjab
- Occupations: Poet; writer
- Writing career
- Period: 1957
- Notable works: Apparition, Keeper of the Dead
- Notable awards: Sahitya Akademi Award (1984), Padma Sri

Keki Nasserwanji Daruwalla (24 January 1937 – 26 September 2024) was an Indian poet and short story writer in English. He was also an Indian Police Service officer.

He was awarded the Sahitya Akademi Award, in 1984 for his poetry collection, The Keeper of the Dead, by the Sahitya Akademi, India's National Academy of Letters. He was awarded Padma Shri, the fourth highest civilian award in India, in 2014.

== Early life and education ==
Keki Nasserwanji Daruwalla was born in Lahore to a Parsi family on 24 January 1937. His father, N.C. Daruwalla, was an eminent professor, who taught in Government College Lahore. Before the Partition of India, his family left undivided India in 1945 and moved to Junagarh and then to Rampur in India. As a result, he grew up studying in various schools and in various languages.

He obtained his master's degree in English Literature from Government College, Ludhiana, University of Punjab spent a year at Oxford as a Queen Elizabeth House Fellow in 1980–81.

He joined the Police Service in 1958. Working as a police officer offered him various opportunities to work in different parts of the country. He witnessed the harsh realities of life from which he drew the substance for his literary pursuits. He wrote twelve books, and his first novel, For Pepper & Christ, was published in 2009. He received the Commonwealth Poetry Prize for his collection of poems Landscape in 1987.

== Career ==
Daruwalla was appointed in the Uttar Pradesh cadre of the Indian Police Service (IPS) on 24 October 1958 after competitive examination. On his first central deputation, he worked as Area Organiser, Chamoli, in Joshimath in the erstwhile Special Service Bureau (now, Sashastra Seema Bal) till 1965. On subsequent central deputation, he worked as Special Assistant on International Affairs to the Prime Minister, Charan Singh from 2 August 1979 to 19 January 1980. Subsequently, he resigned from the IPS to join the Research and Analysis Service (RAS), the internal cadre of R&AW. Within R&AW he rose to the rank of Special Secretary. When his batchmate, Ajit Singh Syali, was promoted to Secretary, R&AW, Daruwalla was shifted as chairman, Joint Intelligence Committee, in the rank of Secretary, on 29 July 1993. He retired as chairman, JIC in 1995. Post-retirement, he was a member of National Commission for Minorities from 3 February 2011 to 2 February 2014.

His first book of poetry was Under Orion, which was published by Writers Workshop, India in 1970. He then went on to publish his second collection Apparition in April in 1971 for which he was given the Uttar Pradesh State Award in 1972. His poems appeared in many poetry anthologies such as Anthology of Contemporary Indian Poetry edited by Menka Shivdasani, and The Dance of the Peacock edited by Vivekanand Jha.

He won the Sahitya Akademi Award, given by the Sahitya Akademi, India's National Academy of Letters, in 1984 and returned the same award in October 2015 in protest and with a statement that "The organisation Sahitya Akademi has failed to speak out against ideological collectives that have used physical violence against authors". Daruwalla did not take back his award even after Sahitya Akademi passed a resolution condemning the attacks on rational thinkers. In an interview to The Statesman, Daruwalla expanded on why he did not take back his award, saying "what you do, you do once and you can’t be seen as giving back an award and then taking it back." He received the Commonwealth Poetry Prize for Asia in 1987. Nissim Ezekiel commented "Daruwalla has the energy of the lion".

== Death ==
Daruwalla died from pneumonia on 26 September 2024, at the age of 87.

== Books ==
- In Morning Dew
- Under Orion. Writers Workshop, India. 1970
- Apparition in April. Writers Workshop, 1971.
- Sword & abyss: a collection of short stories. Vikas Pub., 1979.
- Winter poems. Allied Publishers, 1980.
- The Keeper of the Dead. Oxford University Press, 1982.
- Crossing of rivers. Oxford University Press, 1985.
- Landscapes. Oxford University Press, 1987.
- A summer of tigers: poems. Indus, 1995. ISBN 81-7223-201-2.
- The Minister for Permanent unrest & other stories. Orient Blackswan, 1996. ISBN 81-7530-004-3.
- Night river: poems. Rupa & Co., 2000. ISBN 81-7167-480-1.
- The Map-maker: Poems. Orient Blackswan, 2002. ISBN 81-7530-048-5.
- The Scarecrow and the Ghost
- Collected Poems (1970–2005). (Poetry in English). Penguin Books India., 2006. ISBN 978-0-14-306200-4
- For Pepper & Christ. New Delhi: Penguin, 2010. ISBN 0143065815
- Swerving to Solitude: Letters to Mama.. New Delhi: Simon & Schuster India, 2018. ISBN 978-9386797223

== In popular culture ==
J. P. Dutta's Bollywood film Refugee is attributed to have been inspired by the story of Keki N. Daruwalla based around the Great Rann of Kutch titled "Love Across the Salt Desert" which is also included as one of the short stories in the School Standard XII syllabus English textbook of NCERT in India.

== Appearances in the following poetry Anthologies ==
- Ten Twentieth-Century Indian Poets (1976) ed. by R. Parthasarathy and published by Oxford University Press, New Delhi
- The Oxford India Anthology of Twelve Modern Indian Poets (1992) ed. by Arvind Krishna Mehrotra and published by Oxford University Press, New Delhi

== Online poetry ==
- About Keki Daruwalla and his poems
- The South Asian Literary Recordings Project
- Fire Hymn

== See also ==
- Indian English literature
