= Akhil Katyal =

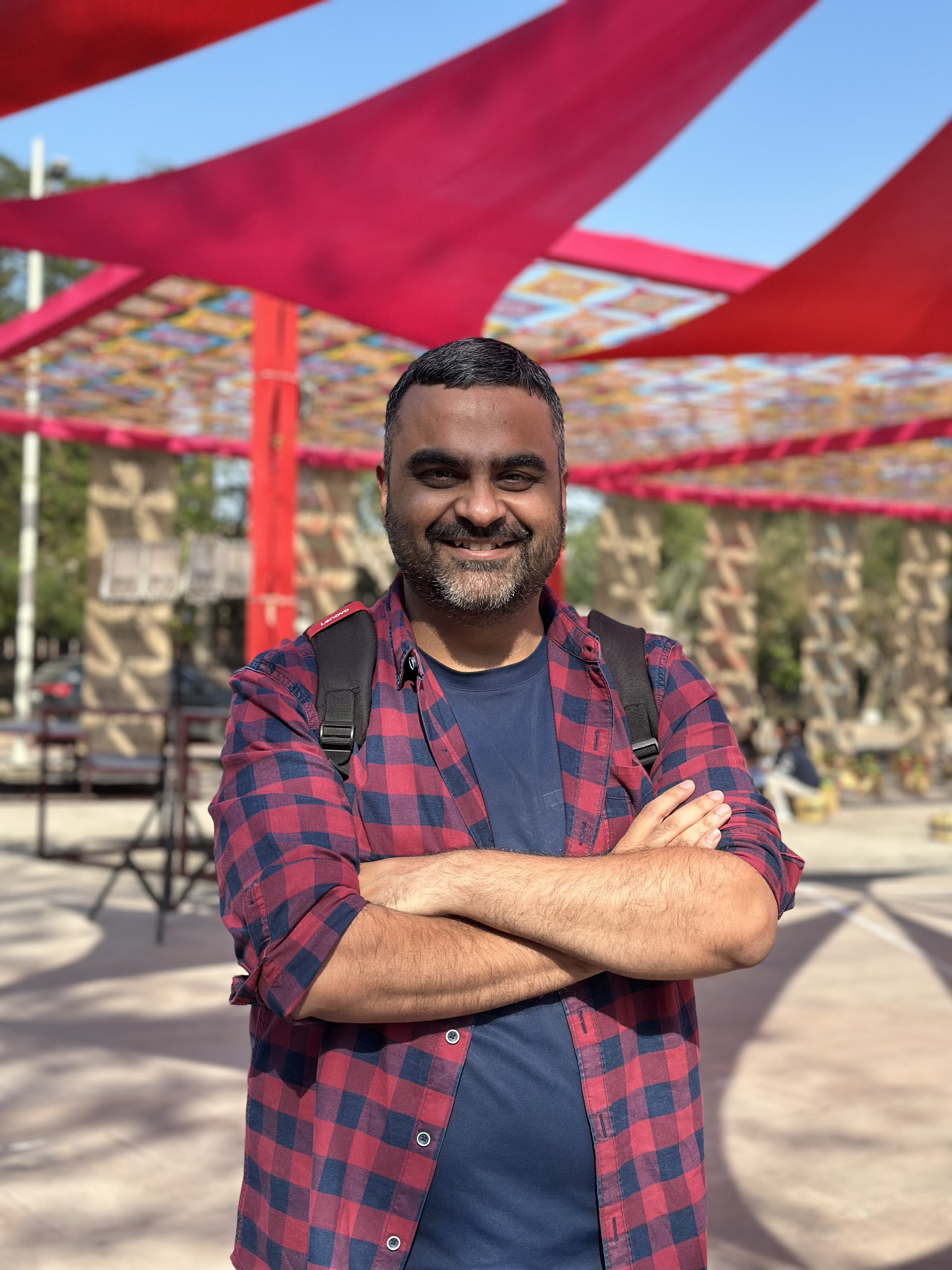
Akhil Katyal in 2025

Akhil Katyal (born 1985 in Bareilly, Uttar Pradesh) is an Indian poet, translator, scholar and a queer activist.

== Career ==
Katyal has published four books of poems: The Last Time I Saw You, Like Blood on the Bitten Tongue: Delhi Poems, How Many Countries Does the Indus Cross, and Night Charge Extra. During fall 2016, he was an International Writing Fellow at the University of Iowa. He was the recipient of the Vijay Nambisan Poetry Fellowship for the year 2021. In 2018, he translated Ravish Kumar's book of Hindi poems Ishq Mein Shahar Hona as A City Happens in Love. In 2020, he co-edited The World that Belongs to Us: An Anthology of Queer Poetry from South Asia. His work appears in Jeet Thayil (ed.) The Penguin Book of Indian Poets (2022). In the summer of 2022, he guest edited a special issue on 'New Indian English Poetry' for Poetry at Sangam. In 2026, his book of poems The Last Time I Saw You won The Wise Owl Literary Award for poetry.

Katyal is from Lucknow, Uttar Pradesh. He has taught creative writing at Ambedkar University Delhi.
