= P C K Prem =

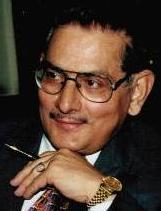
- Born: 28 September 1945 (age 80); Garh Malkher, Palampur, Himachal Pradesh, India
- Occupations: Writer, Poet, Critic
- Spouse: Shakun Katoch
- Children: Dr. Shivalik Katoch Pathania (Daughter) & P. Vikranta Jay Katoch (Son)
- Writing career
- Notable works: Collage of Life (A collection of Poems); A Handsome Man; A Slinging Bag and other Stories; Time and Continuity
- Website: pckprem.blogspot.in

P C K Prem (P C Katoch) is an Indian poet, novelist, short story writer, editor and critic, writing in English and Hindi. He is a former academician, civil servant, and member of the Himachal Public Service Commission, Shimla.

== Biography ==
P C K Prem (P C Katoch) born on 28 September 1945, at Garh Malkher, Palampur, Himachal, is an Indian Poet, novelist, short story writer, editor and critic writing in English and Hindi. He post-graduated from Panjab University, Chandigarh in 1970. He has one daughter Dr. Shivalik Katoch Pathania and a son P. Vikranta Jay Katoch. Presently, he lives with his wife Shakun in their farm at Palampur-176061, Himachal.

== Literary career ==
An author of more than seventy books in English and Hindi, P C K Prem, a former academician, civil servant and Member, Public Service Commission, Shimla, Himachal, has published nine collections of poetry (now poetry is published in four volumes), six novels and four collections of short fiction in English. A few significant works on criticism are: Contemporary Indian English Poetry from Himachal (1992), English Poetry in India: A Comprehensive Survey of Trends and Thought-Patterns (2011), English Poetry in India: A Secular Viewpoint (2011), TEN Poetic Minds in Indian English Poetry and Time and Continuity (2016). Creative writings in Hindi include twenty novels, nine books on short fiction, one collection of poetry and criticism. He is a recipient of more than twenty literary/social awards including the prestigious HP State Guleri & Academy Awards, and Bharat Hindi Rattan Award, the top mutthal of the century award. His critical articles on poetry and fiction have appeared in numerous anthologies. Many literary journals of International repute have also published his critiques on poetry and fiction.

"Indeed, as a creative artist, PCK Prem has tremendous potential and vitality. In his writings he not only offers an exposé of our life in its shocking shallowness or outward show but also provides, down deep, a philosophical prop or basis to sustain our life", says Dr Atma Ram, former Director of Education and Advisor to the Government of Himachal. Prem's novel A Handsome Man was short-listed in the year 2002 for International IMPAC Dublin Literary Award. Moreover, Prem bagged Academy Award for his novel in Hindi, Sangyaheen; Guleri Award for Vanshdaan, Bharat Hindi Ratan Award for contribution to Hindi Literature with special reference to KaalKhand.

== Published books in English ==
=== Poetry collection ===
- Among the Shadows (1989), Narinder Publications, New Delhi
- Enigmas of an Identity (1990), Rachna Publications, Rajpur, Palampur
- Those Distant Horizons (1993), Abhinav Publication, New Delhi
- The Bermuda Triangles (1996), Writers Workshop, Calcutta
- Oracles of the Last Decade (1998), Writers Workshop, Calcutta
- Rainbows at Sixty (2008), Prakash Book Depot, Bareilly
- Of This Age and Obscurity and Other Poem (2011), Authorspress, New Delhi
- Tales of Half-men and Other Poems (2014), Authorspress, New Delhi
- Collage of Life (A collection of Poems) (2016), Authorspress, New Delhi
- Yayati Returns & Other Poems (2017), The Poetry Society of India, Gurgaon
- and the time chases -poems personal and impersonal Authorspress, New Delhi 2018
- Collected Poems of P C K PREM in Four Volumes, Authorspress, New Delhi 2020

=== Novels ===
- Rainbows at Dawn (1991) Writers Workshop, Calcutta
- A Night of Storms: Calcutta (1996), Writers Workshop, Calcutta
- It Shall Be Green Again (1999), Writers Workshop, Calcutta
- A Handsome Man (2001), Abhinav Publication, New Delhi
- A Heart for the Man (2002), Book Enclave, Jaipur
- Not Their Lives (2003) , Book Enclave, Jaipur

=== Short story ===
- Shadows at Dawn (1990), Writers Workshop, Calcutta
- A Slinging Bag and other Stories (2011), Aavishkar Publishers, Jaipur
- Areas of Hope (A Collection of Stories) (2018), Authorspress, New Delhi
- Memorials and Other Stories ibid, 2020

=== Criticism ===
- Contemporary Indian English Poetry from Himachal (1992), Konark Publishers, New Delhi
- English Poetry in India: A Comprehensive Survey of Trends and Thought Patterns (2011), Authorspress, New Delhi
- English Poetry in India: A Secular Viewpoint (2011), Aavishkar Publishers, Jaipur
- Editor -Struggling for Life (A collection of Poems of Dr Mahendra Bhatnagar) (2015), New Delhi
- Ten Poetic Minds in Indian English Poetry (2016), Authorspress, New Delhi
- Time and Continuity (Twelve Contemporary Poets) (2016), Authorspress, New Delhi
- History of Contemporary INDIAN ENGLISH POETRY -AN APPRAISAL VOLUME I, Authorspress New Delhi 2019
- History of Contemporary INDIAN ENGLISH POETRY -AN APPRAISAL VOLUME II, Authorspress New Delhi 2019

=== Ancient Literature ===
- Light of Experience -Indian Literature and Universal Oneness (2013), Authorspress publication, New Delhi
- Selected Tales from the Great Epic MAHABHARATA (Many have not read) (2014), Cyberwit.net. publication
- Folk Tales from Himachal (2017), Authorspress, New Delhi
- Folk Tales from the Northern Region of India (2017), Authorspress, New Delhi
- THE LORD OF GODS VOLUME I (BASED ON SRIMAD BHAGAVATA MAHAPURANA) AUTHORSPRESS NEW DELHI 2019
- THE LORD OF GODS VOLUME II (BASED ON SRIMAD BHAGAVATA MAHAPURANA) AUTHORSPRESS NEW DELHI 2019
- As I Know - The Lord of the Mountains (Shiva Purana)

                 Authorspress, Delhi 2021

- SRIMAD BHAGAVATA MAHAPURANA -AS I UNDERSTAND, PART I - BOOK I TO IV, PART II- BOOK V TO VIII, PART III- BOOK IX TO XII

                 AUTHORSPRESS, DELHI 2023.

- Eternal Truths -A few pages from Ancient Indian Literature

 in Five Parts, R K Publishers & Distributors,  Delhi 110053  -2024

=== Books on P C K Prem ===
- P C K Prem –Echoing Time and Civilizations, Eds. Rob Harle, Sunil Sharma, Sangeeta Sharma, New Delhi: Authorspress Publication, 2015
- P C K Prem Ka Katha Sansar (The Fictional world of P C K Prem), Ed. Dr Jogindra Devi, Delhi: Nirmal Publications 2005
- P C K Prem –The Spirit of Age and Ideas in the novels of PCK Prem, Ed. Dr P V Laxmiprasad, New Delhi: Authorspress, 2016

== Published books in Hindi ==
=== Poetry collection ===
- Indradhanush Shabd Ho Gaye, Praveen Prakashan, Delhi 1992

=== Novels ===
- Akash Mera Nahi, Praveen Prakashan, Delhi, 1988
- File Gawah Hai, Nalanda Prakashan, Delhi, 1988
- Dashansh, Anurag Prakashan, New Delhi, 1991
- Shankhnaad, Atma ram & Sons, Delhi, 1991
- Vishmoh, Rajesh Prakashan, Delhi, 1992
- Sangyaheen, Jagatram & Sons, Delhi, 1992
- Chhote Chhote Riste, Sanmarg Prakashan, Delhi, 1993
- KhudaHua Adami, Jawahar Prakashan, Delhi, 1993
- Vanshdaan, Sanmarg Prakashan, Delhi, 1994
- Itne Baras Baad, Nirmal Prakashan, Delhi, 1998
- Kaalkhand, Nirmal Prakashan, Delhi, 2000

[Five Volumes i.e. I. Aastha II. Manthan, III. Sangharsh, IV. Prayaschit, V. Pratishodh(2300 pages), (scholars of Hindi Literature consider it as one of the longest novels in Hindi)]

- Adha Adhura Ek Din, Piyoosh Prakashan, Delhi, 1998
- Akash Aur Kauve, Bikram Prakahsan, Delhi, 2004

=== Short stories ===
- Chhote Chhote Riste, Sanmarg Prakashan, Delhi, 1993
- Tinka Bhar Dard, Himachal Pustak Bhandar, Delhi, 1988
- Akritiaon Ke Beech, Archana Publication, Meerut, 1990
- Awaazedited, Himotkarsh Prakashan, Una, HP 1989
- Dhundh Me Ugte Sooraj, Rachna Publications, Palampur, 1990
- Riste, Bishanchand &Co., Delhi, 1998
- Chopal Khamosh Hai, Bishan chand & Company, 1998
- Teen Kadam Aur, Rajesh Prakashan, Delhi, 1999
- Bhule biserei Sandharva, 2019 Pushpaanjali Prakashan, Delhi 110053
