= Kersy Katrak =

Parsi poet and advertisement personality

Kersy Katrak (1936–2007) was an Indian Parsi advertising personality and poet who rose to prominence with the advertising agency he founded in 1965, MCM (Mass Communication and Marketing). MCM revolutionized Indian advertising, offered great leeway to creatives, and managed to attract an enormous talent pool including Ajit Balakrishnan, Sudarshan Dheer, Veeru Hiremath, Ravi Gupta, Panna Jain, Arun Kale, Anil Kapoor, Mohammed Khan, Arun Kolatkar, Arun Nanda, Sunder Kaula and Kiran Nagarkar.

After MCM ended in 1975, Katrak went to live at the Mirtola ashram in the Himalayan foothills for several years. He returned to advertising in a consultant capacity in the 1980s.

Katrak wrote four collections of verse, A Journal of the Way and Diversions by the Wayside, in 1969, Underworld in 1979, and Purgatory: Songs from the Holy Planet in 1984, and was anthologized in several collections. A comprehensive collection and discussion of his poetic work, K D Katrak: Collected Poems, edited by William Mazzarella, was published in 2016.
