= Vinita Agrawal =

Indian poet

- Born: 18 August 1965; Bikaner, Rajasthan, India
- Occupations: poet, editor and curator
- Writing career
- Language: English
- Notable work: The Silk of Hunger
- Website: Official website

Vinita Agrawal is an Indian poet, editor and curator. She is the author of four books of poetry and the editor of an anthology on climate change. She was short listed for the 2018 Rabindranath Tagore Literary Prize for her poetry collection The Silk of Hunger and awarded the prize jointly. She is on the advisory board of the Tagore Literary Prize. She is a poetry editor with Usawa Literary Review.

== Early life and education ==
Vinita Agrawal was born on 18 August 1965 in Bikaner. She completed her schooling in Anand (Gujarat), Kalimpong, and Kolkata in West Bengal. Later she completed her Bachelor of Arts and Master of Arts degrees in political science from The Maharaja Sayajirao University of Baroda, and a diploma in computer programming from Aptech.

== Works ==
Her poems were published in Asiancha, Constellations, The Fox Chase Review, Pea River Journal, Open Road Review, Stockholm Literary Review, Poetry Pacific and other journals. She served as the poetry editor of Usawa Literary Review.

She was influenced by the works of Jayanta Mahapatra, Pablo Neruda and Rumi. She writes poems with themes and subjects like existential angst and women's empowerment. She is an author of four books of poetry: Two Full Moons, Words Not Spoken, The Longest Pleasure and The Silk Of Hunger. Two Full Moons explores subjects including birth, death, existence, family, soul and heart.

In 2020, she edited anthology entitled Open your Eyes: An Anthology on Climate Change. It features poetry and prose written by 63 Indian writers. It investigates human relationships with the natural world. She co-edited Yearbook of Indian Poetry in English, 2020-21 with Sukrita Paul Kumar.

== Honour ==
- Nominated for the Best of the Net Awards 2011 by Contemporary Literary Review of India.
- Won Gayatri GaMarsh Memorial Award in the English category (2015).
- Won second prize at TallGrass Writers Guild Award (2017).
- The Proverse Poetry Prize (2017).
- She was short listed for Rabindranath Tagore Literary Prize (2018).
