= D. C. Chambial =

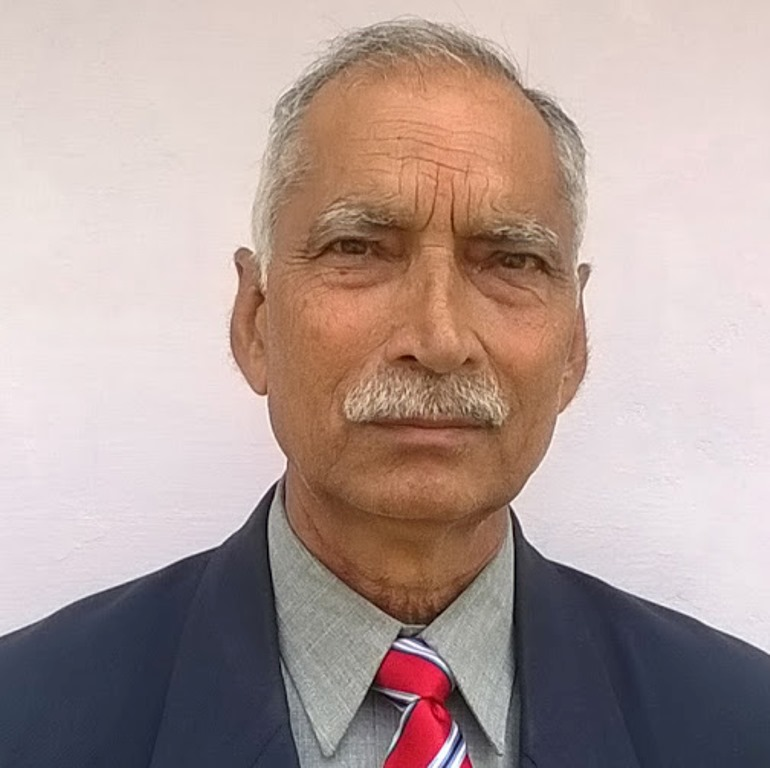
- Born: September 29, 1950; Bajrol in Kangra (Now in Hamirpur), Himachal Pradesh, India
- Died: 20 November 2024 (aged 74)
- Occupations: Poet, editor, critic, academic
- Writing career
- Notable works: Hour of Antipathy; Mellow Tones; Gyrating Hawks & Sinking Roads; Words: 1979–2010 (A Collection of Poems)
- Website: dcchambial.blogspot.in//

Duni Chand Chambial (born 29 September 1950. died 20 November 2024),was a contemporary bilingual poet from Himachal Pradesh and a critic who, as an editor in chief, edited Poetcrit, a reviewed international journal (ISSN 0970-2830) for more than three decades. Chambial appeared as an Indian English poet by publishing his first volume, Broken Images, in 1983. He rooted himself as a poet in Indian English Poetry with the continuous publication of his several other English poetry collections and one in Hindi.

== List of works ==
=== Poetry collections ===
- Broken Images (1983), Samkaleen Prakashan, New Delhi, India
- The Poetry OF Himachal Pradesh (1983), edited, Poetry Publications, Aska (Orissa), India
- The Cargoes of the Bleeding Hearts & Other Poems ( 1984), Golden Books of India, Calcutta, India
- Himpaat (Poems in Hindi) (1985), Kanta Sahitya Prakashan, Maranda, Himachal Pradesh, India
- Perceptions (1986), Kanta Sahitya Prakashan, Maranda, Himachal Pradesh, India
- Gyrating Hawks & Sinking Roads (1996), Kanta Sahitya Prakashan, Maranda, Himachal Pradesh, India
- Before The Petals Unfold (2002), Poetcrit Publications, Maranda, Himachal Pradesh, India
- This Promising Age and Other Poems (2004), Poetcrit Publications, Maranda, Himachal Pradesh, India
- Collected Poems: 1979 – 2004 (2004), Poetcrit Publications, Maranda, Himachal Pradesh, India
- Mellow Tones (2009), Publish America, Baltimore, United States
- Words (2010), Aadi Publications, Jaipur, India
- Words: 1979–2010 (A Collection of Poems) (2012) Aadi Publications, Jaipur, India
- Hour of Antipathy (2014), Poetcrit Publications, Maranda, Himachal Pradesh, India
- Songs of Sonority and Hope (2018), Authorpress, New Delhi, India.
- Song of Light and Other Poems: 2017-2020 (2020), Aadi Publications, Jaipur, India.

=== Criticism ===
- Death and Suffering in the Poetry of Krishna Srinivas(1996), Poet Publications, Chennai, India
- The Theme of Death and Suffering in the Poetry of O. P. Bhatnagar (1999), Kanta Sahitya Prakashan, Maranda, Himachal Pradesh India
- English Poetry in India: A Secular Viewpoint (2011), Aavishkar Publishers, Distributors, Jaipur, India .

== Awards and honours ==
In recognition of his achievements Professor Chambial has received several awards and honours, among them:

- Lachian Art Letters Bronze Medal, 1987 Trans-World Poetry Exposition, Campbell, California (United States);
- 7th Poetry Day Australia, Australia Bicentenary, Gold medal, 26 August 1988;
- Poetry Day Australia, Ist decade Bronze Medal, 1991–92;
- Certificate for Excellence as International Writer, 30 April 1992, Directory of International Writers (University of Colorado, United States);
- POETCRIT: Poetry Magazine of the Year, 1995 by International Writers Association;
- Michael Madhusudan Academy Award 1995, Michael Madhusudan Academy, Calcutta;
- Poetry Day Australia, Dove in Peace Award, Gold medal, 2000;
- Hon. Member, Governing board of directors, ABI, Raleigh (United States);
- Second Best Fixed Form Poet of the Year 2003, Competition organized by Metverse Muse, Visakhapatnam (Andhra Pradesh);
- Participated in 6th World Poetry Day organized under the aegis of Sikkim Akademy, Gangtok (21–24 March 2006);
- "Life Time Achievement Award" by Poetry Intercontinental, Chennai, 2009.
