= Sukrita Paul Kumar =

Indian poet, critic, and academic

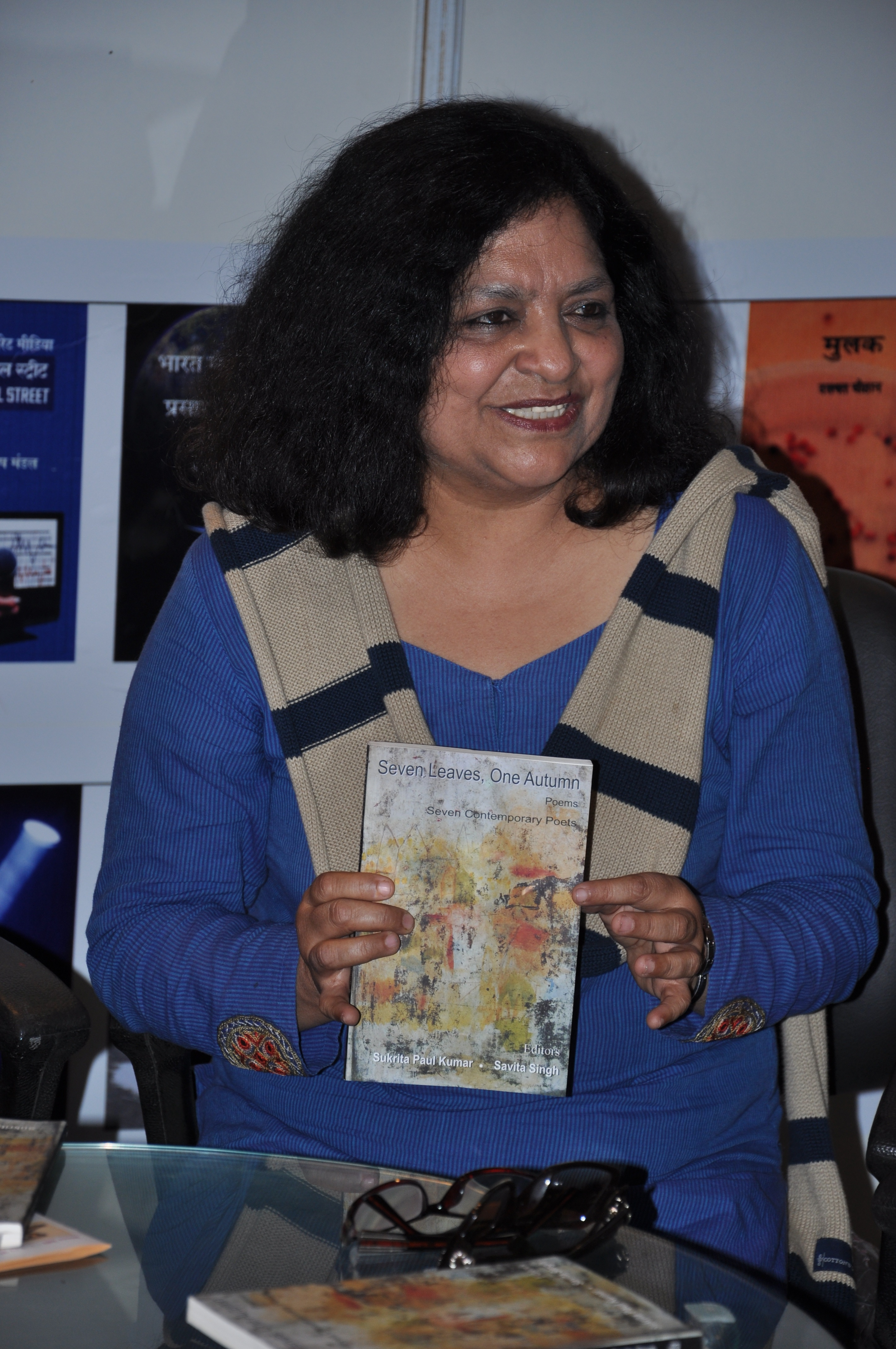
- Born: 1949; Nairobi, Kenya
- Occupations: Poet, literary theorist, anglicist, university teacher, translator

Sukrita Paul Kumar is an Indian poet, critic, and academic. She has been the chief editor of Cultural Diversity, Linguistic Plurality and Literary Traditions of India – a textbook prescribed by the University of Delhi for course use in its Honours B.A. programme.

== Early life and background ==
Sukrita Paul Kumar was born in Nairobi, Kenya and emigrated to India when Kenya obtained its freedom from the British. She was educated at Zakir Husain College, Hindu College and Government College of Arts and Sciences, Marathwada University, India.

== Career ==
As director of a UNESCO project on 'The Culture of Peace', she edited Mapping Memories - a volume of Urdu short stories from India and Pakistan.Funny part is, she does not know Urdu. Many of her poems, have emerged from her experience of working with homeless people, tsunami victims, and street children.

== Fellowships/Awards/Grants ==
Sukrita Paul Kumar was awarded the Visitorship at Concordia University for the designing of a course on Indian Women and their Lives in 2009.

== Books ==
=== Critical ===
- Narrating Partition: Texts, Interpretations, Ideas. Indialog Publications, New Delhi, 2004
- The New Story: A study of Literary Modernism in Urdu and Hindi Short Fiction. Indian Institute of Advanced Study, Shimla with Allied Publishers, New Delhi, 1990
- Conversations on Modernism: Dialogues with Writers, Critics and Philosophers. Indian Institute of Advanced Study, Shimla with Allied Publishers, New Delhi, 1990
- Man, Woman and Androgyny: A study of the Novels of Theodore Dreiser, Scott Fitzgerald and Ernest Hemingway. Indus Publishing Co. New Delhi, 1989

=== Edited ===
- The Dying Sun: Stories by Joginder Paul Edited by Sukrita Paul Kumar, HarperCollins, New Delhi, 2013
- Chamba Achamba Co-Edited with Malashri Lal, Sahitya Akademi, New Delhi, 2012
- Speaking for Myself Co-Edited with Malashri Lal, Penguin India, New Delhi, 2009
- Crossing Over Co-Edited with Frank Stewart, University of Hawaii, Hawaii, 2009
- Interpreting Home in South Asia Co-Edited with Malashri Lal, Pearson Longman's, New Delhi, 2007
- Cultural Diversity, Linguistic Plurality and Literary Traditions of India Chief Editor: Sukrita Paul Kumar, Macmillan India, New Delhi, 2006 (Textbook prescribed by Delhi University as Concurrent Course for B.A Honours.)
- Women's Studies in India: Contours of Change Edited by Sukrita Paul Kumar and Malashri Lal,

IIAS, Shimla, 2002. (Collection of Essays)

- Ismat, Her Life Her Times Edited by Sukrita Paul Kumar and Sadique. ALT (Approaching Literature through Translation) Series, Katha, New Delhi, 2000 (Critical Essays and Autobiographical Pieces on Ismat Chughtai.)
- Mapping Memories Edited by Sukrita Paul Kumar and Muhammad Ali Siddiqui. Katha, New Delhi, 1998

(Urdu stories from India and Pakistan translated into English. The same collection of stories in the original Urdu was published as Bazdeed by Katha, New Delhi, 1998

- Breakthrough Selected and Edited by Sukrita Paul Kumar. Indian Institute of Advanced Studies, Shimla, 1993

Modern Hindi and Urdu short stories (Translated into English)

=== Translated ===
- Stories of Joginder Paul Joginder Paul. National Book Trust, New Delhi, 2003

(Translation of Urdu stories into English.)

- Sleepwalkers Joginder Paul. Katha, New Delhi, 2001

(A novel translated by Sunil Trivedi and Sukrita Paul Kumar.)

=== Poems ===
- Seven Leaves, One Autumn Rajkamal Publications, New Delhi, 2011
- Poems Come Home (Bilingual, Translated by Gulzar) HarperCollins, New Delhi, 2011
- Rowing Together Rajkamal Publications, New Delhi, 2008
- Without Margins Bibliophile South Asia, New Delhi, 2005
- Folds of Silence Kokil, New Delhi, 1996
- Apurna Writer's Workshop, Calcutta, 1988
- Oscillations Ashajanak Publishers, New Delhi, 1974

=== Included in the following poetry Anthologies ===
- Travelogue : The Grand Indian Express (2018) ed. by Dr. Ananad Kumar and published by Authorspress, New Delhi
- Converse : Contemporary English Poetry by Indians (2022) ed. by Sudeep Sen and published by Pippa Rann Books, London
