= Robin Ngangom =

Indian poet and translator

Robin S Ngangom (born 1959) is an Indian poet and translator from Manipur, North Eastern India.

== Biography ==
Robin Singh Ngangom was born in Imphal, Manipur of North Eastern India. He is a bilingual poet who writes in English and Meiteilon. He studied literature at St Edmund's College and the North Eastern Hill University Shillong, where he teaches. His books of poetry include Words and the Silence (1988) published by Writers Workshop, Time's Crossroads (1994) and The Desire of Roots (2006). His essay, Poetry in a Time of Terror appeared in The Other Side Of Terror: An Anthology Of Writings On Terrorism In South Asia published by Oxford University Press, New Delhi (2009). He was conferred with the Katha Award for Translation in 1999.

== Bibliography ==
Books

- The Desire of Roots ( Poetry in English ). Cuttack: Chandrabhaga, India 2006
- Time's Crossroads ( Poetry in English ). Hyderabad: Orient Longman Ltd, India 1994. ISBN 0-86311-456-3
- Words and the Silence ( Poetry in English ). Kolkata: Writers Workshop, India 1988

== See also ==
- Indian English Poetry
