= A. J. Thomas (poet) =

Indian poet writing in English (born 1952)

A. J. Thomas (born 10 June 1952) is an Indian poet, translator and editor writing in English. He is best known as editor of Indian Literature, the bimonthly English journal of Sahitya Akademi (India's National Academy of Letters) which he edited till 2010.

== Biography ==
Thomas was born in Mount Illickan valley of Western Ghats. His childhood was spent in Mechal, Kottayam. In 1976 he took up employment with Kerala Tourism Development Corporation. Subsequently, he came in contact with internationally renowned writers like Dominique Lapierre, Sir Angus Wilson, Salman Rushdie, and Indian writers like Pritish Nandy, M. T. Vasudevan Nair who inspired him.

== Literary works ==
Thomas has translated poetry, fiction, drama and non-fiction from Malayalam to English. His first book of note was Bhaskara Pattelar and Other Stories, a translation of Paul Zacharia's stories. This was a recreation of the original with Gita Krishnankutty and Zacharia as contributors.

Thomas's literary works have appeared in poetry anthologies like The Dance of the Peacock: An Anthology of English Poetry from India, featuring 151 Indian English poets, edited by Vivekanand Jha and published by Hidden Brook Press, Canada. and Converse: Contemporary English Poetry by Indians (2022) edited by Sudeep Sen and published by Pippa Rann Books, [London].

== Awards and recognition ==
Thomas has received more recognition for literary translation. He won Katha award for his translation of Paul Zacharia's story "Salam America". The verse-fiction Ujjaini, based on the life of Kalidasa by O. N. V. Kurup, the doyen of Malayalam poetry, in Thomas's translation, won critical acclaim. For translating the novel Keshavan’s Lamentions, by veteran Malayalam novelist M. Mukundan, he won the Vodafone Crossword Book Award 2007. According to Dr Tapan Kumar Pradhan, the Indian Literature Golden Jubilee Awards of Sahitya Akademi were the original brain child of A. J. Thomas. Thomas was the chief editor of Indian Literature till 25 August 2010.
