= Bibhu Padhi =

Poet from Odisha, India (born 1951)

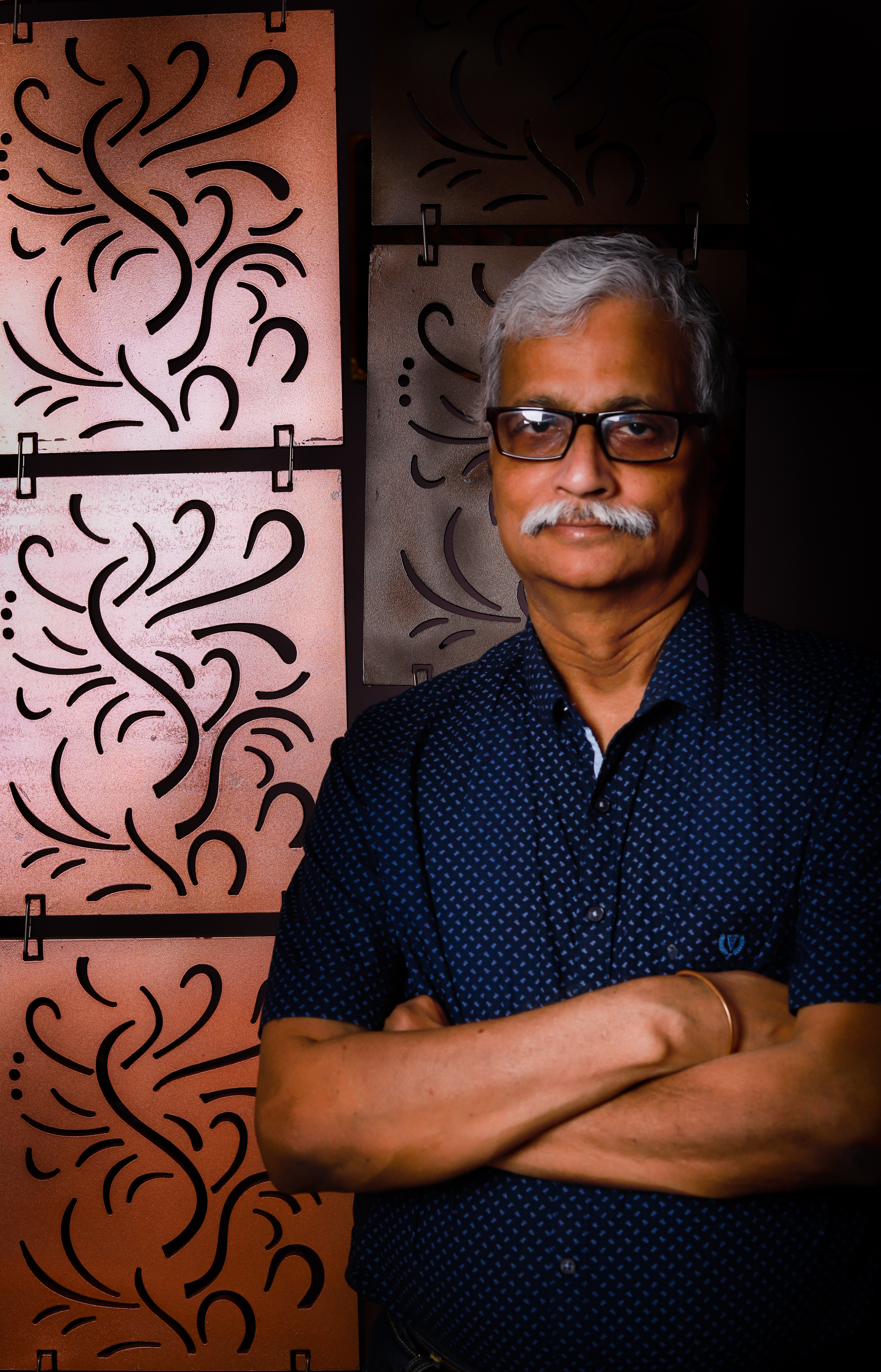
- Bibhu Padhi at his home in Bhubaneswar in 2020
- Born: 16 January 1951 (age 75); Cuttack, Odisha, India.
- Education: Ravenshaw College, Cuttack
- Occupations: Poet and teacher
- Known for: Poetry, translation, literary criticism

Bibhu Padhi (born Bibhu Prasad Padhi; 16 January 1951), is an Indian poet. He writes in English and Odia, and is also a translator and literary critic. He has authored 19 volumes of poetry in English, 5 volumes of poetry in Odia, and a novel in English. He has twice been awarded the Orbis Readers' Award (1985, 1989), and twice been nominated for the Pushcart Prize (2017, 2022).

His poems have appeared in distinguished literary magazines throughout the English-speaking world, including The London Magazine, Times Literary Supplement, Contemporary Review, Poetry Review, The Rialto, Orbis, Stand, Poetry Wales, Agenda, Poetry, Poet Lore, The New Criterion, The American Scholar, The Missouri Review, The Manhattan Review, Wallace Stevens Journal, Rosebud, Southwest Review, TriQuarterly, Prairie Schooner, New English Review, Queen’s Quarterly, The Antigonish Review, and The Dalhousie Review. They have also been included in numerous anthologies and textbooks, such as 2PLUS2: A Collection of International Writing (Mylabris Press), Anvil New Poets, This Same Sky (Simon & Schuster), Welcome to the World (Barefoot Books), Journeys (HarperCollins), Language for a New Century (Norton), The Bloodaxe Book of Contemporary Indian Poets, The HarperCollins Book of English Poetry, The Penguin Book of Indian Poets, and Converse (Pippa Rann Books).

== Childhood, education and family ==
Padhi was born to Nilachal Padhi and Padmabati Padhi on 16 January 1951 in Cuttack, Odisha. He studied at Ravenshaw Collegiate School and Ranihat High School, Cuttack, then joined Ravenshaw College, Cuttack (now Ravenshaw University), for a Bachelor of Arts degree in English literature in 1969 and Master of Arts in English literature in 1971. He received a Doctor of Letters (D.Litt.) from Utkal University in 1991 in English literature. He is married to Minakshi Padhi, a writer and academic. They have two sons, Buddhaditya and Siladitya.

== Career ==
Padhi served on the faculty of several colleges in Odisha, including Regional College of Education (now Regional Institute of Education), Ravenshaw College and BJB College, where he taught English Literature. He was also a Counsellor in Creative Writing for the Odisha branch of Indira Gandhi National Open University from 1986 to 1990. In his doctoral thesis, he critically examined the writing of D.H.Lawrence, which culminated in the book D.H. Lawrence: Modes of Fictional Style.

== Selected poems (from literary magazines) ==
- New English Review, 2013
- America, 2018
- Buddhist Poetry Review, 2013
- Commonweal, 2017
- Poetry, 1989
- London Magazine, 2020
- Poetry, 1976
- Times Literary Supplement, 2023
- Poetry, 1977
- Missouri Review, 2018
- The New Criterion, 1989
- The American Scholar, 2018

== Poetry readings (video recordings) ==
- At the Indian Embassy in Nepal, 2014
- At the Odisha Art and Literature Festival, 2020

== Conversations with Padhi ==
- Writer and film-maker Chris LaMay-West in conversation with Bibhu Padhi
- Prof. Mahuya Bhaumik in conversation with Bibhu Padhi
- Prof. Nandini Sahu in conversation with Bibhu Padhi

== On Padhi's poetry ==
- Prof. Binod Mishra, IIT Roorkee
- Prof. Sudhir K. Arora, MJP Rohilkhand University

== Bibliography ==
Poetry

- Going to the Temple (New Delhi: Indus, 1988; rpt. New Delhi: Authorspress, 2008)
- A Wound Elsewhere (New Delhi: Rupa, 1992)
- Lines from A Legend (Leeds, UK: Peepal Tree Press, 1993)
- Painting the House (Hyderabad, India: Orient Longman, 1999)
- Games the Heart Must Play: a trilogy in of love poems (Bhubaneshwar,: Pen & Ink, 2003)
- Choosing A Place (New Delhi: Gnosis/Authorspress, 2011)
- Migratory Days (New Delhi: Authorspress, 2011)
- Brief Seasons: 60 love songs, (Bhubaneswar, Timepass, 2013)
- Magic Ritual (New Delhi: Authorspress, 2014)
- Midnight Diary (New Delhi: Authorspress, 2015)
- Sea Dreams (New Delhi Authorspress, 2017)
- Small Wants: Selected Poems (New Delhi: Authorspress, 2018)
- All That Was and Is: Poems Inspired by Upanishads (New Delhi: HarperCollins, 2019)
- A History of Things (New Delhi: Authorspress, 2020)
- Going Easy (New Delhi: Signorina Publications, 2020)
- A Friendship with Time (Kolkata: Hornbill Press, 2021)
- Principles of Sleep (New Delhi: Red River, 2021)
- This Damp House (New Delhi: Red River, 2024)
- Voices of the Sea (New Delhi: Red River, 2025)

Chapbook

- Living with Lorenzo: Poems on D H Lawrence (Cuttack: Peacock Books, 2003)

Novel

- Absences (New Delhi: Authorspress, 2014)

Other works

- D H Lawrence: Modes of Fictional Style (Albany, NY: Whitston, 1989)
- Indian Philosophy and Religion: A Reader’s Guide (Jefferson, NC & London: McFarland, 1990; rpt. New Delhi: D K Printworld, 1999; 2nd rpt. DK Printworld, 2004) [with Minakshi Padhi]
- D H Lawrence: New Essays from India (New Delhi: Atlantic, 2024)

Translations

- A Morning of Rains and Other Poems: Selected Poems of Sitakant Mahapatra (New Delhi: Vikas, 1990) [Mahapatra is a recipient of India’s highest literary award, the "Bharatiya Gyanapith"].
- Memories, Legends, and the Goddess: Selected Poems of Bibek Jena, (Bhubaneswar, 2013)
- Parallel Speech: An Anthology of Fifteen Younger Contemporary Oriya Poets (New Delhi: Authorspress)

== See also ==
- Indian English Literature
- List of Indian poets
- Sitakant Mahapatra
