= Nalini Priyadarshni =

Indian poet and writer

- Born: Jalandhar, Punjab
- Occupations: Writer, poet

Nalini Priyadarshni is an Indian poet and writer.

== Literary journals ==
- Poetry Breakfast – Journal of poems Poetry Breakfast – Journal of poems, 2016
- Silver Birch Press I Am Waiting Series Silver Birch Press I Am Waiting Series, 31 December 2014
- eFiction India eFiction India, 2015
- Learning and Creativity- Poetry Month Special Learning and Creativity- Poetry Month Special, April, 2015
- Read Fingers Read Fingers, 2015
- The In-flight Magazine The In-flight Magazine, 2015
- Whispers in the Wind Whispers in the Wind, 13 May 2015
- Yellow Chair Review Yellow Chair Review, Page 13, August 2015
- Calliope Magazine Calliope Magazine, Page 16, March 2015
- Verbal Art Verbal Art, Page 153, 2015
- The Gambler The Gambler, 28 February 2014
- Spring Fling, Scotland's Premier Art and Craft Open Studio Event

Spring Fling, Scotland's Premier Art and Craft Open Studio Event, 21 May 2015

- Haiku Universe Haiku Universe, 2 September 2015
- Lipstick party Magazine Lipstick party Magazine, 2015
- Beakful | Becquée Beakful | Becquée, 2 February 2015
- Iconic Lit Iconic Lit, 14 December 2015
- Wax Poetry Art Wax Poetry Art, 2014
- Episteme Episteme, Special: Contemporary Women Poetry, September 2015
- The Open Road Review Author The Open Road Review Author
- The Asian Signature The Asian Signature, Interview with Roland Bastien, 2015
- The Basil O' Flaherty The Basil O' Flaherty, Interview with Nabina Das 2016
- Up The Staircase Quarterly Up The Staircase Quarterly, issue#23, 2013
- eFiction India eFiction India, In Conversation with Dr. Ampat Koshy, 18 April 2015
- Writing Raw Writing Raw, 2014
- Tell Us a Story Tell Us a Story, 15 April 2015
- Elders of Thuban The Muse in all her Colors, 9 October 2014
- HIV Here & Now Poem-a-Day countdown to 35 years of AIDS Poem-a-Day countdown to 35 years of AIDS on 5 June 2016, Poem 277 ± 7 March 2016
- The Camel Saloon The Camel Saloon, 20 & 25 May 2014
- Duane's Poetree Duane's Poetree, 2 June 2016
- Mad Swirl Mad Swirl
- Words Surfacing Words Surfacing, Page 39, 2015
- Earl of Plaid Court Jester, Golden Bridge, Page 5-8
- Random Poem Tree Random Poem Tree, 29 December 2015
- The Murmur The Murmur, April 2015
- Festival Of Poetry Festival Of Poetry, 24 November 2015
- Writer's Café Writer's Café

== Anthologies ==
- Resonating String Published by Authorspress India, Delhi- ISBN 978-9352070312
- The Significant Anthology Published by Primalogue Publishing Media Private Limited- ISBN 978-9382759096
- 52 Loves ISBN 978-1518891489
- Resonance ISBN 978-9352070602
- Contemporary Major Indian Women Poets Published by The Poetry Society Of India ISBN 978-9383888702
- The Lie of the Land Published by Sahitya Akademi ASIN B0897M9YG3
- From The Ashes Published by Animal Heart Press ISBN 978-0359961283
