= Arundhathi Subramaniam =

English language Indian poet

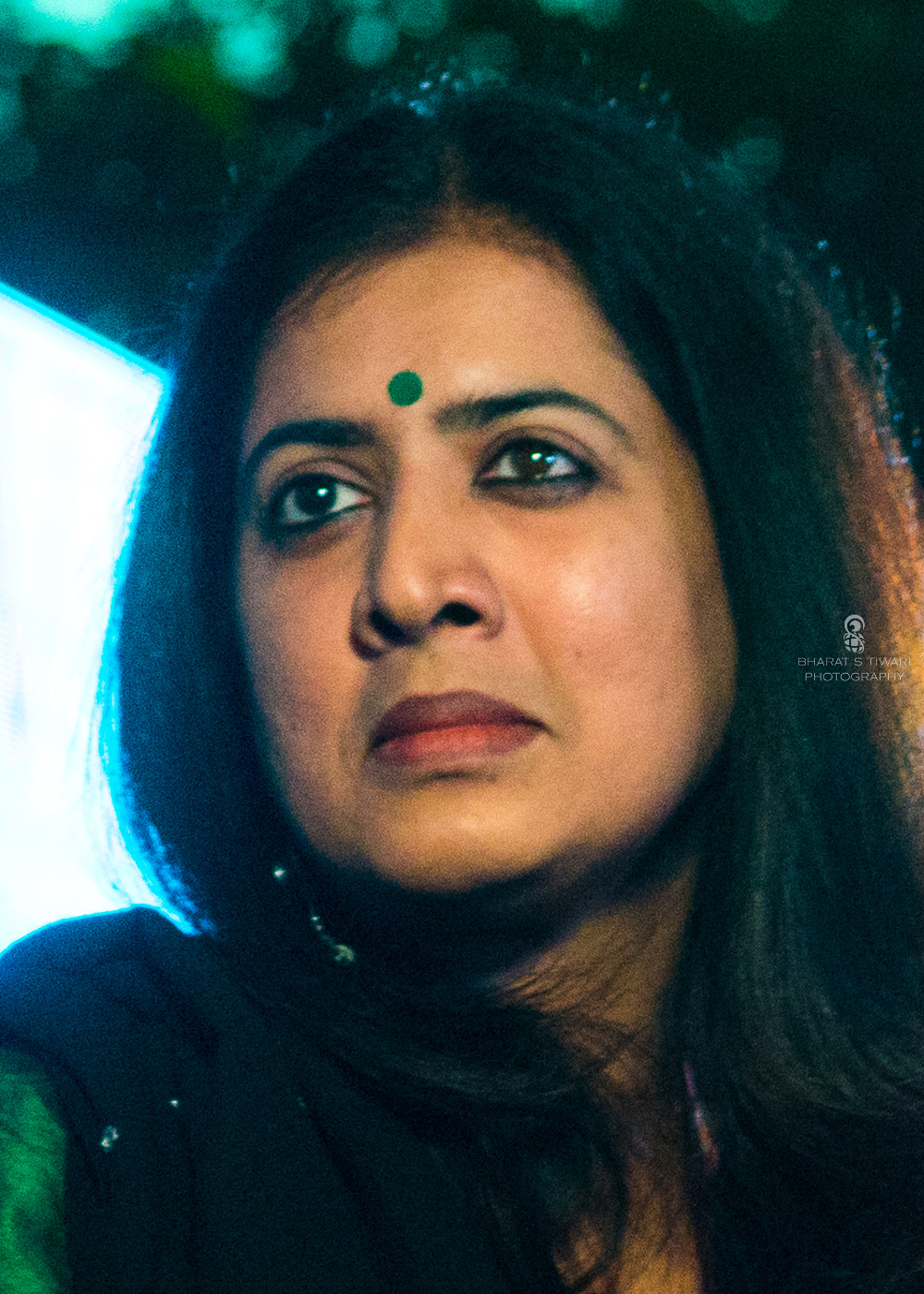
- Born: Arundhathi; 1973 (age 52–53); Coimbatore, Tamilnadu, India
- Education: JB Petit High School, St. Xavier's College, Mumbai, University of Mumbai
- Occupations: Poet, writer
- Writing career
- Notable awards: Sahitya Akademi Award

Arundhathi Subramaniam is an Indian poet and author, who has written about culture and spirituality. She was born in Coimbatore, Tamilnadu, South India.

== Life and career ==
Subramaniam is a poet and writer based in Mumbai. She is the author of 13 books of poetry and prose.

She has received the Raza Award for Poetry, the Zee Women's Award for Literature, the International Piero Bigongiari Prize in Italy, the Charles Wallace, Visiting Arts and Homi Bhabha Fellowships.

Her volume of poetry When God Is a Traveller was the Season Choice of the Poetry Book Society, was shortlisted for the T. S. Eliot Prize in 2015, and won the Sahitya Akademi Award for the year 2020.

Her poetry has been published in Reasons for Belonging: Fourteen Contemporary Poets (Penguin India); Sixty Indian Poets (Penguin India), Both Sides of the Sky (National Book Trust, India), We Speak in Changing Languages (Sahitya Akademi), Fulcrum No 4: An Annual of Poetry and Aesthetics (Fulcrum Poetry Press, US), The Bloodaxe Book of Contemporary Indian Poets (Bloodaxe, UK), Anthology of Contemporary Indian Poetry (United States), The Dance of the Peacock: An Anthology of English Poetry from India, featuring 151 Indian English poets, edited by Vivekanand Jha and published by Hidden Brook Press, Canada, and Atlas: New Writing (Crossword/ Aark Arts).

She has worked as Head of Dance and Chauraha (an inter-arts forum) at the National Centre for the Performing Arts in Mumbai, and has been Editor of the India domain of the Poetry International Web.

== Awards ==
On 25 January 2015, Subramaniam won the first Khushwant Singh Memorial Prize for her poetry work When God Is a Traveller.

On 22 December 2017, Subramaniam won the first Mystic Kalinga Literary Award, announced during the Kalinga Literary Festival.

She won the Sahitya Akademi Award for English in 2020 for When God Is a Traveller.

== Bibliography ==
=== Poetry ===
- Love Without a Story ISBN 978-9388689458
- When God Is a Traveller.ISBN 978-9388689458,
- Where I Live: New & Selected Poems. Bloodaxe Books UK, 2009.
- Where I Live (Poetry in English). Allied Publishers India, 2005.
- On Cleaning Bookshelves (Poetry in English). Allied Publishers India, 2001.
- The Gallery of Upside Down Women. Bloodaxe Books, 2025.

=== Prose ===
- Women Who Wear Only Themselves Archived 26 October 2021 at the Wayback Machine, Speaking Tiger, 2021
- Adiyogi: The Source of Yoga (co-author with Sadhguru), Harper Element, 2017, ISBN 978-9352643929
- Sadhguru: More Than A Life, biography, Penguin Ananda, 2010 (third reprint)
- The Book of Buddha, Penguin, 2005 (reprinted several times)

=== As editor ===
- Pilgrim's India (An Anthology of Essays and Poems on Sacred Journeys), Penguin, 2011
- Confronting Love (An Anthology of Contemporary Indian Love Poems) (co-edited with Jerry Pinto), Penguin, 2005
- Eating God: A Book of Bhakti Poetry, Penguin, 2014

== See also ==
- Indian English Literature
- Indian Writing in English
