= Madan Gopal Gandhi =

Indian educationalist

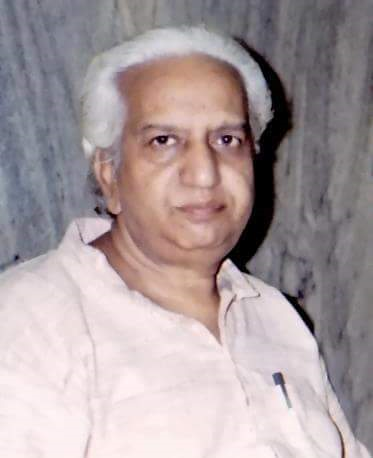
- Born: 31 August 1940; Lahore
- Died: 26 January 2019 (aged 78); Gurgaon, India
- Occupations: Writer; poet; educationalist

Dr. Madan G. Gandhi (31 August 1940 – 26 January 2019) was an educationalist, litterateur and poet. They were a visiting fellow of St. John's College, Cambridge.

== Early childhood ==
Gandhi was born on 31 August 1940 in Lahore to Srimati Savitri Devi and Kewal Krishan. After the partition, the family relocated to India, where Madan completed his FSc at S.A. Jain College in 1958 and earned a B.A. with Honors in English Literature from D.A.V. College, Ambala City in 1960.

== Education ==
He did his M.A. in English in 1964 from Panjab University, Chandigarh. His second master's degree was in Political Science from Punjabi University, Patiala in 1966 and Ph.D. in Political Science from Panjab University, Chandigarh in 1974.

== Works ==
As an editor, he edited six volumes of the Collected Works of Lala Lajpat Rai. He brought out the inaugural issue of the journal Earth Vision and, as editor of the South Asia News Letter, published 7 issues featuring the following volumes:

1. Sir Chhotu Ram: A Political Biography
2. Gandhi & Marx
3. Gandhian Aesthetics
4. Modern Political Analysis
5. Modern Political Theory
6. Dialogue Among Civilizations
7. Globalization: A Reader
8. New Media: A Reader
9. Gopal Krishna Gokhle: A Political Biography
10. Creative Writing
11. Kundalini
12. Ashes & Embers
13. Haikus & Quatrains
14. Petals of Flame
15. Luteous Serpent
16. Meandering Maze
17. Freak Stair
18. Ring of Silence
19. Enchanting Flute
20. Shunayata in Trance
21. The Imperiled Earth
22. Ashtavakra Gita
23. Dattatreya Gita
24. Zen Gita
25. Gayatri
26. Guru Nanak's Japuji - The Celestial ladder (2010);
27. Avadhut Gita (2017);
28. Ewafe (2013);
29. Kundalini Awakening (2013);
30. Pravrajya Peals (2013);
31. Planet in Peril (2014);
32. Heavenly Hymns (2014);
33. Intercontinental Anthology of Poetry on Universal Peace (2014);
34. Burnished Beads (2015);
35. Dervishes' Dance (2016);
36. Bonsai Blossom (2016);
37. Arspoetica (2017);
38. Umbilical Chords : Anthology of Parents (2015);
39. Mandela Tributes (2014);
40. Jora Sanko (2014)

== Works translated into other languages ==
The poetry of Madan G Gandhi was translated into several languages including Persian by Khadijeh Khavari, Najmeh Khavari with the title The Best Works of Madan G Gandhi, in Italian by Maria Miraglia, Tamil by Padmaja Narayanan as Petals of Flame, and Hindi by Jai Krishan Shukla Swar Se Saadh Anant.

== Awards ==
Gandhi received a number of awards in his lifetime.

== See also ==
- List of Indian writers

== Notes ==
- "The Tribune, Chandigarh, India - National Capital Region". Tribuneindia.com.
- "Haiku: Simply Haiku". Simplyhaiku.com.
- "FG: A Poetic Meet". Fridaygurgaon.com.
- Fahredin Shehu. "Fahredin Shehu". Fahredin-sh.blogspot.in.
- Mandela Tributes edited by Mutiu Olawuyi & Madan Gandhi, Global Fraternity of Poets Publishing, India ISBN 978-93-83888-06-1
- "Aristos". Dagupan.com.
- "Poems of Mangalaprathaban". Poetmangalaprathaban.blogspot.in. 26 April 2013.
- "Stray Pebbles - Yayati Madan G Gandhi - All Books". Thepoetrysocietyofindia.com.
- "Inklinks - Anthology". Cyberwit.net.
- "Being and Becoming". randompoemtree.wordpress.com. February 2016.
- "Lotuses Bloom". whispersinthewind333.blogspot.in. 7 February 2016.
