= T. Vasudeva Reddy =

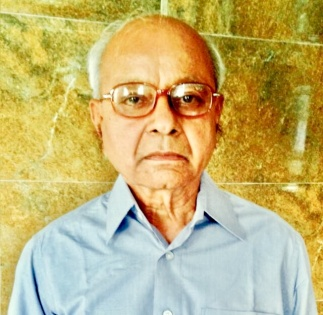
- Born: 21 December 1943 (age 82); Tirupati, Andhra Pradesh, India
- Died: 26 August 2020
- Occupations: Poet, novelist, critic & academician
- Spouse: Late Smt. T. Komala
- Children: Two sons & a daughter
- Parent(s): Late. T. Muni Reddy and Late Smt. Annapurnamma

Dr. T. Vasudeva Reddy (21.Dec.1943 - 26.Aug.2020), from Tirupati, Andhra Pradesh, was a poet, novelist and critic in English. He authored 12 collections of poems, two novels and three critical works. His poems appeared in journals in India and abroad. He was Hon.President of GIEWEC (Guild of Indian English Writers Editors and Critics).

== List of works ==
=== Poetry collections ===
- The Rural Muse:The Poetry of T.Vasudeva Reddy (2014), ed.by K. V. Raghupathi, Authors Press, New Delhi, India
- Golden Veil (2016), Authors Press, New Delhi, India
- Thousand Haiku Pearls (2016), Authors Press, New Delhi, India

=== Novels ===
- The Vultures (1983), Calcutta, India
- Minor Gods (2008), New York City, United States

=== Criticism ===
- Jane Austen: The Dialectics of Self-Actualization in her Novels (1987), Sterling, New Delhi, India
- Jane Austen: The Matrix of Matrimony (1987), Bohra Publication, Jaipur, India
- A Critical Survey of Indo-English Poetry (2016), Authors Press, New Delhi, India

== Awards and honours ==
In recognition of his achievements Professor Reddy has received several prestigious awards and honours, among them:

- ‘The International Eminent Poet’ in 1987;
- Hon. D.Litt. from the WORLD ACADEMY OF ARTS AND CULTURESan Francisco, United States in 1988;
- Best Teacher Award (Univ.& College Level) from the Govt. of Andhra Pradesh, India, in 1990;
- Best poetry Award for his third book The Fleeting Bubbles from Michael Madhusudan Academy, Kolkata in 1994;
- UGC (University Grants Commission) Award of National Fellowship (as Visiting Prof.) in 1998;
- Award of ‘Excellence in World Poetry’ for the year 2009;
