= Sudeep Sen =

Indian English poet and editor (born 1964)

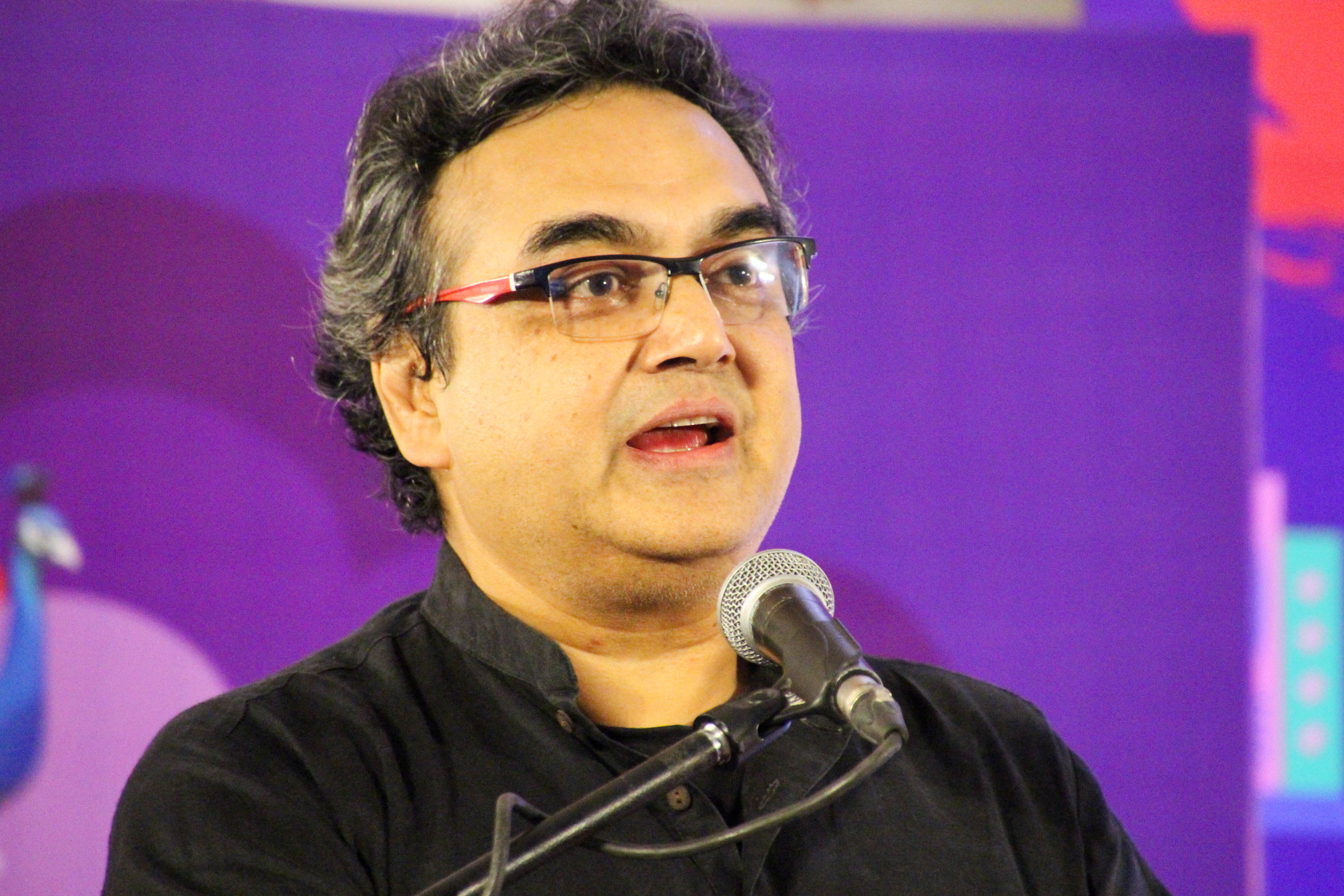
- Sudeep Sen 2025
- Born: 1964 (age 61–62)
- Education: Hindu College, Delhi
- Occupation: Poet
- Writing career
- Genre: modernism
- Notable works: New York Times; Monsoon
- Notable awards: Kathak Literary Award; Rabindranath Tagore Literary Prize

Sudeep Sen (born 1964) is an Indian English poet and editor.

== Early life ==
He was educated at St. Columba's School in Delhi and received a degree in English literature from Hindu College, University of Delhi. He received a master's degree from the Columbia University Graduate School of Journalism in New York City. Sen also received a master's degree in English and creative writing from Hollins University and was an international scholar at Davidson College. From 1992 to 1993 he was an international poet-in-residence at the Scottish Poetry Library in Edinburgh, and in 1995 he was a visiting scholar at Harvard University. In 1995 he set up a poetry publishing company, Aark Arts. He has a son named Aria.

== Works ==
Sen's books include Postmarked India: New & Selected Poems, Rain, Aria, Postcards from Bangladesh, Fractals: New & Selected Poems | Translations 1980-2015 and EroText.

=== Poetry ===
- Leaning Against the Lamp-Post (1983)
- The Man in the Hut (1986)
- The Lunar Visitations (1990)
- Kali in Ottava Rima (1992)
- Parallel (1993)
- New York Times (1993)
- South African Woodcut (1994)
- Mount Vesuvius in Eight Frames (1994)
- Dali's Twisted Hands (1995)
- Postmarked India: New & Selected Poems (1997)
- Retracing American Contours (1999)
- A Blank Letter (2000)
- Lines of Desire (2000)
- Almanac (2000)
- Perpetual Diary (2001)
- Monsoon (2002)
- Distracted Geography: An Archipelago of Intent (2003)
- Prayer Flag (2003)
- Rain (2005)
- Heat (2009)
- Winter Frances (2010)
- Mediterraneo (2012)
- Ladakh (2012)
- Fractals: New & Selected Poems|Translations 1978-2013 (2013)
- Fractals: New & Selected Poems | Translations 1980-2015 (2015)
- Incarnat | Incarnadine (2017)
- Path to Inspiration (2017) (with Setsuko Klossowska de Rola & Homa Arzhangi)

=== Prose ===
- Postcards from Bangladesh (2002) (with Tanvir Fattah & Kelley Lynch)
- BodyText: Dramatic Monologues in Motion (2009)
- EroText (2016)

=== Translations ===
- In Another Tongue (2000)
- Love & Other Poems (2001)
- Spellbound & Other Poems (2003)
- Love Poems (2005)
- Aria (2009)

=== Editor, co-editor ===
- 1995 Wasafiri: Contemporary Writing from India, South Asia and the Diaspora. University of London.
- 1996 Lines Review Twelve Modern Young Indian Poets. Edinburgh: Lines Review.
- 1998 Index for Censorship (poems); Songs of Partition (portfolio). London: Index for Censorship
- 2001-18: Six Seasons Review. Dhaka: University Press Limited & London: Aark Arts.
- 2001 Hayat Saif: Selected Poems. Dhaka: Pathak Samabesh.
- 2001 The British Council Book of Emerging English Poets from Bangladesh. Dhaka: The British Council.
- 2002 Dash: Four New German Writers. Berlin: Humboldt University & London: Aark Arts.
- 2002 Shawkat Haider: A Day with Destiny. Dhaka: Azeez.
- 2004 Midnight's Grandchildren: Post-Independence English Poetry from India. Macedonia: Struga Poetry Evenings (in Macedonian).
- 2005 Sestet: Six New Writers. Berlin: Free University & London: Aark Arts.
- 2006 Biblio South Asian English Poetry (portfolio). New Delhi: Biblio.
- 2006–present Atlas: New Writing, Art & Image. London, New York, New Delhi: Aark Arts.
- 2009 The Literary Review. Indian Poetry. Fairleigh Dickinson University.
- 2010 World Literature Today: Writing from Modern India. University of Oklahoma.
- 2011 Poetry Review Centrefold Portfolio of Indian Poetry. UK: Poetry Review.
- 2012 The HarperCollins Book of English Poetry. HarperCollins.
- 2012 The Yellow Nib: Modern English Poetry by Indians. Belfast: Seamus Heaney Centre for Poetry, Queens University.
- 2013: The Prairie Schooner Feast Anthology of Poetry by Indian Women. University of Nebraska.
- 2015: World English Poetry. Dhaka: Bengal Foundation.

== Awards ==
Year	Works	Awards
2022	Anthropocene: Climate Change, Contagion, Consolation	joint-winner of the US$10,000 Rabindranath Tagore Literature Prize for 20221-22
2018	Postcards from Bangladesh	UPL Excellence Award
2017	EroText	Global Literary Festival Award for Literary Excellence
2017	EroText	Best Book of the Year
2009	Aria	AK Ramanujan Translation Award
2009	Blue Nude	Jorge Zalamea Poetry Award
2007		Kathak Literary Award
2004		Pleiades Honour
