= Mani Rao =

Indian poet

Mani Rao (born 28 February 1965) is an Indian poet and independent scholar, writing in English.

== Biography ==
Mani Rao has authored thirteen poetry collections including So That You Know (HarperCollins 2025) and three books in translation from Sanskrit including the works of Kalidasa, a translation of the Bhagavad Gita as a poem, and a translation of the tantric hymn Saundarya Lahari, besides an anthropological study of mantra-practice called "Living Mantra: Mantra, Deity and Visionary Experience Today."

Translations of Rao's poems have been published in Kannada, Latin, Italian, Korean, Chinese, Arabic, French, German and Kannada. Rao has had poems published in literary journals including Poetry Magazine, Fulcrum, Wasafiri, Meanjin, Washington Square, West Coast Line, Tinfish, and in anthologies including The Penguin Book of the Prose Poem, Language for a New Century: Contemporary Poetry from the Middle East, Asia, and Beyond (W.W. Norton, 2008), and The Bloodaxe Book of Contemporary Indian Poets. (Bloodaxe Books, 2008) She was a visiting fellow at the Iowa International Writing Program in 2005 and 2009, held the 2006 University of Iowa International Programs writer-in-residence K-12 fellowship, and writing residencies at Omi Ledig House in 2018 and International Poetry Studies Institute (IPSI) Canberra in 2019. She was a co-founder of OutLoud, a regular poetry-reading gathering in Hong Kong, and contributed a poetry segment to RTHK Radio 4.

She performed at literary festivals in India including the Jaipur Literature Festival, Bangalore Literature Festival, Hindu Lit for Life and Apeejay Kolkata Literature Festival, and at International literature festivals in Hong Kong, Singapore, Melbourne, Vancouver, Chicago, Canberra and New York PEN World Voices.

Rao worked in advertising and television from 1985 to 2004 in Chennai, Mumbai, Hong Kong and Auckland. In Hong Kong, Rao worked for Star (TV) Group Ltd for 9 years, and was the Senior Vice-President of Marketing and Corporate Communications. She spearheaded the 'Kaun Banega Crorepati' marketing campaign (Who Wants to be a Millionaire). She has an MFA from the University of Nevada-Las Vegas and a PhD in Religious Studies from Duke University.

== Bibliography ==
Books and Chapbooks

- So That You Know (HarperCollins, 2025)
- Kalidasa: Selected Poetry and Drama (HarperCollins, 2025)
- Slow Down, River. (Translation from Hindi of Anamika's poetry. Red River Books, Hummingbird series 2025).
- Bhagavad Gita: God's Song (HarperCollins, 2023)
- Saundarya Lahari (HarperCollins, 2022).
- Love Me in a Hurry/"Bega Preethsu Nanna" bilingual with Kannada translation by Prathibha Nandakumar (Atta Galatta, Bangalore, 2022).
- Sing to Me (Recent Work Press, 2019).
- Living Mantra – Mantra, Deity and Visionary Experience Today (Palgrave Macmillan, 2019).
- New & Selected Poems (Poetrywala, India, 2014).
- Echolocation (Math Paper Press, Singapore, 2014). (First publication : Hong Kong: Chameleon Press, 2003)
- Ghostmasters, (Hong Kong: Chameleon Press, 2010)
- Mani Rao:100 Poems, 1985–2005, (Hong Kong: Chameleon Press, 2006)
- Salt (Hong Kong: Asia 2000)
- The Last Beach (Bilingual with Chinese translation. Trans. Huang Chan Lan. Hong Kong: Asia 2000, 1999)
- Living Shadows (Bilingual with Chinese translation. Trans. Huang Chan Lan. Drawings Mani Rao. Hong Kong: HKADC, 1997)
- Catapult Season (Calcutta: Writers Workshop, 1993)
- Wing Span (Calcutta: Writers Workshop, 1987)

Essays

- “Decoding Augustine via Saussure.” In-Between Journal of Literary Criticism (Sep 2009). 131-139.
- “Repetitiveness in Gita translations.” eXchanges (Winter 2009).
- “Caterpillar to Butterfly: Thoreau’s dietary journey.” Thoreau Society Bulletin (Issue 270, 2010).
- “Reading the Rigveda.” Indian Literature (Issue 262. Vol LV. No 2. March-April 2011).
- “Automatic Writing – Real, Surreal, Indeterminate.” Fulcrum (Issue 7, 2011).
- Lorine Niedecker Condens.” Interim (Vol.28 No.1 & 2, 2010 and Vol 29 issue 3, 2012). Using only Niedecker’s words, a poem-essay of her poetic principles.
- Review of Arvind K. Mehrotra’s Songs of Kabir. Translation Review (Vol 83, 2012).
- “A Brief History of the Bhagavad Gita’s Canonization.” Religion Compass, Nov 2013.
- “Preface” to Autobiography of a Goddess— Andal,” a translation by Priya Sarukkai Chabbria and Ravi Shankar. New Delhi: Zubaan Books, 2016.
- “Up, Down, Up.” Review of Availalable Light by C.P.Surendran. Scroll. 11 Nov 2017.
- “Experience of Srividya at Devipuram.” Religions 2019, 10, 14; doi:10.3390/rel10010014.
- The Conjuring of Atman in Gita translations. Osmania Journal of English Studies, 2019.
