= Vrihanta =

Vrihanta was king of the Ulukas. His name appears at several places in the Mahabharata.

- Book 5, Udyoga Parva, Chapter 157: Duryodhana sends the Uluka king as a messenger to the Pandava camp when both the parties were camping on either side of the River Hiranwati, where Krishna was also present.
- Book 5, Udyoga Parva: King Uluka presents himself before Yudhishthira and delivers the message of Duryodhana after apologizing for delivering such a harsh message.
- Book 6, Chapter 685, Bhishma Parva: Sahadeva fought with the two invincible warriors Shakuni and the mighty car-warrior Uluka. Those great bowmen were Sire and Son. (It looks as though Vrihanta was the son of Shakuni).
- Book 8, Karna Parva, chapter 44: Uluka proceeded in the direction of Panchalas and vanquished Yudhamany the Panchala prince, and began to slaughter his army with his sharp arrows.
- Book 8, Karna Parva, Chapters 44-40 and 41: Sahadeva fought with Uluka and killed his horses and the charioteer. Uluka jumped down from the car and took shelter in the division of the Terigartas.
- Book 11, Sabha Parva, Chapter 24: Vrihanta, the king of Uluka, gave battle to Phalguna (Arjuna), and in a fight that took place between them was said to be very tough. Arjuna snatched out the kingdom from Vrihanta, but having made peace with him, marched along with him to conquer the neighbouring king Senavindu.
