= Purushottama Lal =

Indian writer (1929–2010)

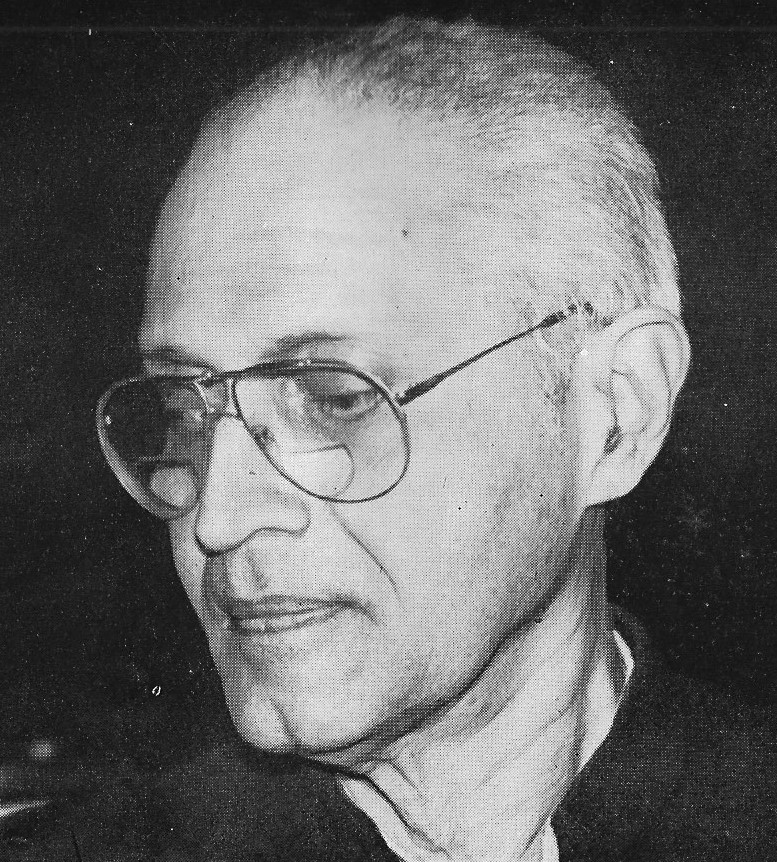
- Born: 28 August 1929; Kapurthala, Punjab. British India
- Died: 3 November 2010 (aged 81); Kolkata, India
- Education: M.A. in English
- Alma mater: St. Xavier's College, Calcutta, and the University of Calcutta
- Occupations: Writer, academic, translator
- Spouse: Shyamasree Nag
- Children: Ananda Lal, Srimati Lal
- Writing career
- Language: English
- Period: 1953–1993
- Genre: Indian classics
- Notable works: Transcreation of Mahabharata, Upanishads in English
- Notable awards: Padma Shri, Honorary Doctorate of Letters, Western Maryland College
- Website: writersworkshopindia.com

Purushottama Lal (28 August 1929 – 3 November 2010), commonly known as P. Lal, was an Indian poet, author, translator, professor and publisher. He was the founder of publishing firm Writers Workshop in Calcutta, established in 1958.

== Life and education ==
Born in Kapurthala in the state of Punjab, Lal studied English at St Xavier's College, Calcutta, and later at the University of Calcutta. He would later teach at St. Xavier's College for over forty years.

P. Lal was Special Professor of Indian Studies at Hofstra University from 1962 to 1963, and held Visiting Professorships at many colleges and universities throughout America. These included University of Illinois, Albion College, Ohio University, Hartwick College, Berea College, and Western Maryland College.

He married Shyamasree Devi in 1955, and had a son, Ananda Lal, and a daughter, Srimati Lal.

== Career ==
He wrote eight books of poetry, over a dozen volumes of literary criticism, a memoir, several books of stories for children, as well as dozens of translations from other languages, chiefly Sanskrit, into English. He also edited a number of literary anthologies. He was awarded the prestigious Jawaharlal Nehru Fellowship in 1969.

He is perhaps best known as the translator and "transcreator" of the epic poem Mahabharata in English. His translation, which was published in an edition of over 300 fascicules since the early 1970s, was republished in a collated edition of 18 large volumes. His Mahabharata is the most complete in any language, comprising all the slokas. His translation is characteristically both poetic and swift to read, and oriented to the oral/musical tradition in which the work was originally created. To emphasise this tradition, he began reading the entire 100,000-sloka work aloud in 1999, for one hour each Sunday at a Calcutta library hall.

In addition to the Mahabharata, his translations from Sanskrit included a number of other religious and literary works, including 21 of the Upanisads, as well as plays and lyric poetry. He also translated modern writers such as Premchand (from the Hindi) and Tagore (from the Bengali).

Since his founding of Writers Workshop, he published over 3000 volumes by Indian literary authors, mostly in English, including poetry, fiction, educational texts, screenplays, drama, "serious comics," and children's books, as well as audiobooks. Writers Workshop has published first books by many authors including Vikram Seth, Pritish Nandy and Chitra Banerjee Divakaruni.

His publishing enterprise was unusual in that he personally served as publisher, editor, reader, secretary, and editorial assistant. The books were also unique in appearance, hand-typeset on local Indian presses and bound in hand-loomed sari cloth. Writers Workshop continues to publish, under the direction of Lal's family members.

Some of the last works he was engaged in publishing were Holmes of the Raj by Vithal Rajan, Seahorse in the Sky by G Kameshwar and Labyrinth by Arunabha Sengupta.

== The Mahabharata Non-Rhyming English Verse Transcreation ==
This is the most complete translation to date. The Harivamsa Parva is still left to be "transcreated" and translated but it is not considered a part of the Mahabharata although it is considered an appendix to the Mahabharata. There are no plans for the Harivamsa Parva at present. The Mairavanacaritam (The Life of Mai-Ravana) (100 pages) is a part of Ramayana rather than the Mahabharata.

Volume Number	Volume Title	Sub-Parva	Pages	Price (INR)	Translator and "Transcreator"
01	Adi Parva (The Beginning)	001–019	1208	2000	P. Lal
02	Sabha Parva (The Assembly Hall)	020–029	491	600	P. Lal
03	Vana Parva (The Forest)	030–050	1400	2000	P. Lal
04	Virata Parva (Virata)	051–054	303	400	P. Lal
05	Udyoga Parva (The Effort)	055–066	813	1000	P. Lal
06	Bhishma Parva (Bhishma/Tenacity)	067–070	797	1000	P. Lal
07	Drona Parva (Drona)	071–078	1383	1200	P. Lal
08	Karna Parva (Karna)	079	932	1000	P. Lal
09	Shalya Parva (Shalya/The Pike)	080–083	628	1000	P. Lal
10	Sauptika Parva (The Sleeping Warriors)	084–085	138	200	P. Lal
11	Stri Parva (The Women)	086–089	141	200	P. Lal
12	Shanti Parva (Peace)	090–091 (volume 1); 092 (volume 2)	1969 = 900 + 1069	4000 = 2000 + 2000	P. Lal (volume 1) Pradeep Bhattacharya (volume 2)
13	Anushasana Parva (The Instructions)	093–094	1256	3000	Pradeep Bhattacharya
14	Ashvamedhika Parva (The Horse Sacrifice)	095–096	417	300	P. Lal
14	Jaiminiya Ashvamedhika Parva (Jaimini's Version of The Horse Sacrifice)	095–096	488	500 (Flexiback), 800 (hardback) (US$70 outside India)	Shekhar Kumar Sen (Editor: Pradeep Bhattacharya)
15	Ashramavasika Parva (The Hermitage)	097–099	147	150	P. Lal
15	The Jaiminiya Mahabharata (Sahasramukharavanacaritam) (The Life of the 1000-Headed Ravana)	?	337	850	Shekhar Kumar Sen and Pradeep Bhattacharya
16	Mausala Parva (The Clubs)	100	41	150	P. Lal
17	Mahaprasthanika Parva (The Great Journey)	101	16	150	P. Lal
18	Svargarohana Parva (The Ascent to Heaven)	102	29	150	P. Lal
19 (Khila)	Harivamsa Parva (The Genealogy of Hari)	103–105	?	TBA	TBA

== See also ==
- Indian English Poetry
- Indian English Literature
- Writers Workshop
