= Shakuni =

Gandhara King and antagonist in the Indian epic Mahabharata

- Mahabharata character
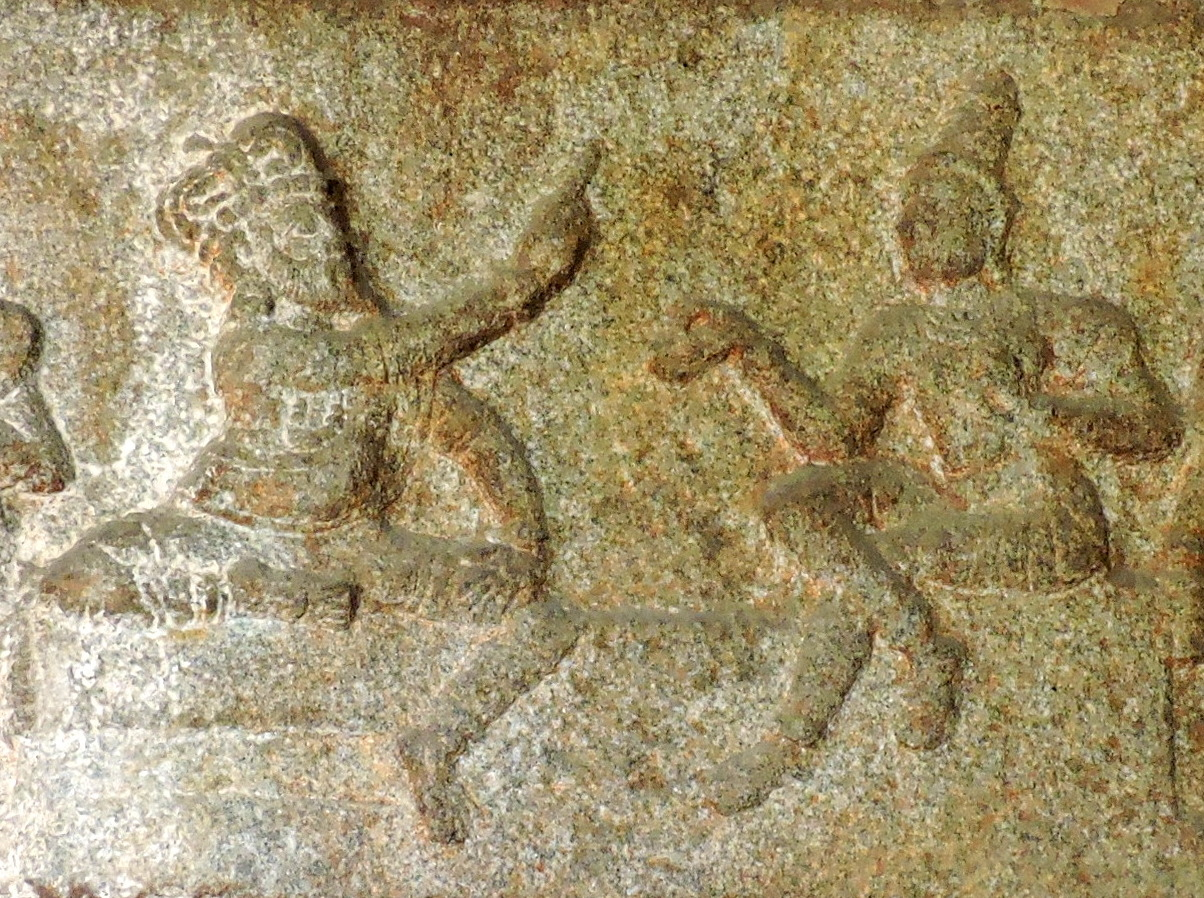
- Shakuni (left) and Yudhishthira playing dice-game, relief at Lepakshi

Information
- Title: King of Gandhara
- Affiliation: Kauravas
- Family: Subala (father); Gandhari (sister); Achala, Vrishaka, Gaja and other brothers
- Spouse: Unnamed queen
- Children: Uluka (elder son); Unnamed younger son
- Relatives: Dhritarashtra (brother-in-law); Duryodhana, Dushasana, Vikarna and 97 other nephews; Dushala (niece)
- Home: Gandhara Kingdom

Shakuni (Sanskrit: शकुनि, IAST: Śakuni, lit. 'bird') is one of the antagonists of the Hindu epic Mahabharata. He was the prince of the kingdom of Gandhara when introduced, later becoming its king after the death of his father, Subala. He was the brother of Gandhari and the maternal uncle of the Kauravas.

Portrayed as crafty and devious, Shakuni supported his nephews, particularly the eldest, Duryodhana, in plotting against their cousins—the Pandavas. It was Shakuni who played the game of dice against Yudhishthira, one of the seminal events in the epic. Using his skills of manipulation and foul play, he won the game twice, causing the exile of the Pandavas and the consolidation of the power of the Kauravas. During the Kurukshetra War between the Kauravas and the Pandavas, Shakuni, along with his eldest son Uluka, was killed by the youngest Pandava, Sahadeva. Shakuni was succeeded by his younger son as the king of Gandhara.

== Etymology and epithets ==
The Sanskrit word Śakuni means 'a large bird', often used for denoting a vulture. Other figures with the same name include a serpent, a rishi, a son of King Ikshvaku, and an asura son of Hiranyaksha who was the father of Vrikasura.

Shakuni has been referred to by epithets in the Mahabharata. Various patronymics include Saubala, Saubalaka, Saubaleya, Subalaja and Subalaputra. Due to his origin from Gandhara, Shakuni was also referred to as Gāndhārapati, Gāndhārarāja, Gāndhārarājaputra, Gāndhārarājasuta. Parvatīya ('he who is from the mountains') and Kitava ('gambler') are also prominent epithets of Shakuni.

== Biography ==
=== Early life and family ===
According to the Mahabharata, Shakuni was an incarnation of the entity named Dvapara, who presides over Dvapara Yuga, the third age in the Hindu cycle of time. He was born as a result of fury of the gods, born to destroy righteousness.

Shakuni was the son of Subala, the king of Gandhara (in modern day Pakistan). Shakuni had a sister named Gandhari, and many brothers among whom Achala and Vrishaka were the most prominent. Uluka was his son and he served as a messenger during the Kurukshetra War. The epic's Ashvamedhika Parva mentions another son of Shakuni who survives the battle of Kurukshetra and becomes the king of Gandhara. During Arjuna's military expedition for Ashvamedha, he fights and loses to Arjuna, before being saved from death by Shakuni's widowed queen.

The Adi Parva of the Mahabharata says that Bhishma, then the guardian of the Kuru kingdom, went to Gandhara to arrange the marriage of its princess, Gandhari, to Dhritarashtra, the elder son of Vichitravirya, who was blind by birth. Subala was initially reluctant due to Dhritarashtra's blindness, but later agreed after considering the high reputation of the Kuru royal family. Shakuni accompanied his sister to Hastinapura, the capital of the Kurus. After the marriage, Shakuni returned to Gandhara.

=== Influence on Kuru ===
Shakuni often visited Hastinapura and stayed there to look after his sister, who blindfolded herself out of devotion for her blind husband, and her children, the Kauravas. Similarly, Krishna (the maternal cousin of the Pandavas) helps the Pandava brothers throughout the epic. The family of Draupadi (the common wife of the Pandavas) also plays a major role in raising her children. Based on such examples, scholars note the importance and influences of the maternal families in the shaping the narrative of the Mahabharata.

Shakuni had a close alliance with his eldest nephew, Duryodhana and desired him to become the next Emperor of the Kuru Clan. Throughout the epic, he helps Duryodhana in his evil plans to take the throne from the Pandavas. Metaphorically, the Adi Parva calls Duryodhana as the 'tree of wrath', with Shakuni being called his 'branches'.

=== The game of dice ===
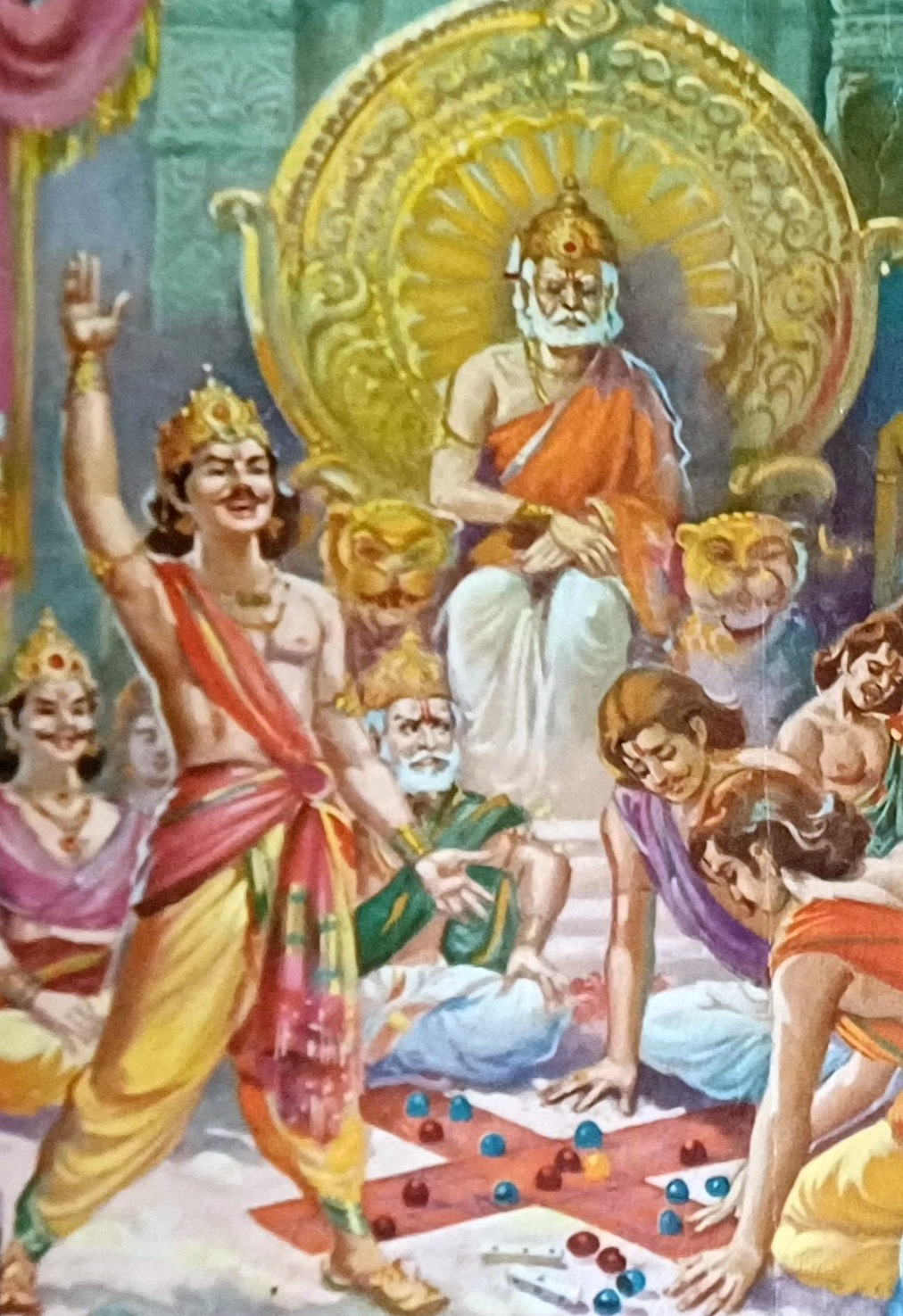
An illustration depicting the dice-match between Shakuni (seated, in green) and Yudhishthira.

In the epic, Shakuni's most integral episode is during the gambling match between Duryodhana and Yudhishthira (the eldest Pandava brother). The event is one of the turning points in the epic, which leads to the humiliation of Draupadi and the exile of the Pandavas.

The Sabha Parva of the Mahabharata narrates the event. When a succession dispute between Duryodhana and Yudhishthira arises, Dhritarashtra divides the Kuru kingdom into two regions. The Pandavas found the city of Indraprastha, which serves as the capital of their half of the ancestral domains. To achieve imperial status, Yudhishthira decides to perform the Rajasuya yajna and the royal families of different kingdoms are invited to the sacrifice. Shakuni, along with his father, brothers and nephews, also attends the event. After the yajna is completed, all the guests return to their kingdoms, but Shakuni and Duryodhana stay on and witness the wealth and prosperity of the Pandavas. (Note: The story continues with Duryodhana felling into a water pool at the palace and the Pandavas laughing at him. Humiliated by this, Duryodhana and his allies return to Hastinapur.)

After returning to Hastinapura, Shakuni notices Duryodhana's distress over the Pandavas' growing fame and prosperity. He capitalizes on Duryodhana's jealousy and suggests organizing Pasha—a game of dice—to settle the matter between the Kauravas and the Pandavas. Shakuni, known as the Grandmaster of Dicing, proposes the idea of a duel between the two branches of the Kuru clan through a game of dice. Duryodhana supports this idea, and they plan to use Shakuni as Duryodhana's proxy in the game. Shakuni, along with Duryodhana, convinces Dhritarashtra to organize the game of dice. Despite objections from the wise counsellor Vidura, Duryodhana threatens to commit suicide if his plan is not accepted. Dhritarashtra, shaken by his son's distress, reluctantly agrees to proceed with the game. Vidura again tries to stop the game, recognising the danger it poses. He appeals to Dhritarashtra to halt the proceedings, emphasising the unethical nature of the game and Shakuni's deceitful tactics. Shakuni assures to Dhritarashtra that he has observed Yudhisthira's poor skills in dice despite his passion for the game. He plans to exploit this weakness, knowing that Yudhisthira would be a vulnerable opponent in the upcoming match.

Despite Vidura's warnings, Yudhishthira agrees to the proposed gambling match, and arrives in Hastinapura accompanied by his brothers and their wife, Draupadi. Shakuni, as Duryodhana's proxy, engages in a game of 20 throws with Yudhisthira. Each time, Yudhisthira loses, leading to the gradual loss of his wealth, servants, and even his brothers. Shakuni, unapologetic about using trickery, justifies his tactics as necessary for a worthy contestant. He dismisses Yudhisthira's plea to avoid crooked means and proceeds with the game, using his expertise in giving theft the appearance of skillful play. During the game, Shakuni's skill in presenting foul play as fair entertains Duryodhana and the Kaurava elders. Dhritarashtra, blinded by excitement, eagerly asks if Shakuni has won after each throw. Ultimately, Yudhisthira stakes himself and loses. Afterwards, he loses Draupadi resulting in her humiliation by Duryodhana and his allies.

Draupadi questions Yudhishthira’s accountability for staking her after losing himself in the game and manages to reclaim their possessions from Dhritarashtra. Following the dice game, Sahadeva, the youngest of the Pandavas, vowed to slay Shakuni in a fit of anger. After Pandavas return to their capital, Duryodhana, dissatisfied with the failure of his earlier plan, complains to Dhritarashtra and makes him immediately invite Yudhishthira for another round of the game. In this round, only one stake is stipulated with the losing side being exiled for thirteen years. With Shakuni's skills, Duryodhana wins again and the Pandavas are forced into exile.

=== Shakuni after the Dice Game ===
Following the conclusion of the dice game, which resulted in the exile of the Pandavas, Shakuni continued to play an active role in the Kaurava court. His involvement during the period between the dice game and the outbreak of the Kurukshetra War is documented in several episodes in the Mahabharata.

In Vana Parva, at one point, Shakuni predicted that the Pandavas would not return after completing their period of exile and incognito living, as prescribed by the terms of the dice game. Later, while the Pandavas were residing in the Dvaita forest, Shakuni supported the idea of leading a royal procession to visit them. The procession, which included both Shakuni and Duryodhana, proceeded into the forest. During this encounter, Shakuni was wounded in a conflict with the Gandharvas and subsequently returned to Hastinapura.

On a later occasion, Shakuni advised Duryodhana to consider restoring the Pandavas' kingdom (Vana Parva, Chapter 251, Verse 1). This suggestion, however, did not result in any change in the Kaurava policy. However, Shakuni's counsel and tactics are cited as contributing factors in the failure of reconciliation between the Kauravas and Pandavas following the latter's return from exile.

=== Kurukshetra War ===
Shakuni, actively participated in the Kurukshetra War from the side of the Kauravas, where he showcased a mix of skill, trickery, and strategy. He advised Duryodhana at key moments of the war. On the first day of the war, Shakuni engaged in a duel with Prativindhya (Bhishma Parva, Chapter 45, Verse 63). As the war progressed, he had confrontation with Iravan, who managed to slay five of Shakuni's brothers in the battle (Bhishma Parva, Chapter 90, Verse 25). Subsequently, Shakuni faced Yudhishthira, Nakula, and Sahadeva, experiencing defeat at their hands (Bhishma Parva, Chapter 105, Verse 8).

His use of illusion tricks against Arjuna was met with resilience as Arjuna successfully countered them, forcing Shakuni to retreat from the battlefield (Drona Parva, Chapter 30, Verse 15). Shakuni also engaged in combat with Abhimanyu, Nakula, Sahadeva, and Satyaki. Later, Bhima's onslaught led to the demise of seven mahārathis and five brothers of Shakuni (Drona Parva, Chapter 157, Verse 22). As the war progressed into the Karna Parva, Shakuni defeated Shrutasena but succumbed to the prowess of Satyaki and Bhima in subsequent battles (Karna Parva, Chapter 25, Verse 40; Karna Parva, Chapter 61, Verse 48; Karna Parva, Chapter 77, Verse 66). Shakuni engaged in a duel with Kulinda Kumara, who rode his elephant and attacked the forces of Gandharas, but got beheaded by Shakuni (Karna Parva, Chapter 85, Verse 7). In the Shalya Parva, Shakuni was wounded by the cavalry of the Pandavas (Shalya Parva, Chapter 23, Verse 41).

=== Death ===
On the 18th day of the war, following the death of Kaurava commander-in-chief Shalya, the Pandavas attacked Shakuni and his Gandhara army. According to the narrative, Shakuni remained composed, inspiring his army to fight fearlessly. He advanced against Sahadeva, initiating the combat with considerable aggression. In response, Sahadeva launched a volley of swift arrows, compared in the text to a swarm of insects for their rapidity and density. Simultaneously, Uluka, Shakuni’s son, engaged Bhima and struck him with a series of ten arrows, while Shakuni dealt Sahadeva a significant blow to the head with a lance, temporarily incapacitating him.

Uluka then intensified his assault in an effort to defend his father, discharging seven arrows at Bhima and seventy at Sahadeva. Bhima retaliated by striking both Uluka and Shakuni with a flurry of arrows, including sixty-four directed at Shakuni. Sahadeva soon recovered and, with a well-aimed broad-headed arrow, decapitated Ulūka on the battlefield. Shakuni, witnessing the death of his son, was overcome with grief. Recalling the admonitions of Vidura, he became enraged and launched a final, solitary attack against Sahadeva, wielding a lance adorned with gold. Sahadeva responded with a carefully aimed broad-headed arrows, forged of hard iron and tipped with golden wings. The arrow struck with precision, severing Shakuni’s head from his body. The Pandava army, joined by Krishna, responded with audible celebration, blowing conches.

=== Aftermath ===
Following the conclusion of the Kurukshetra War, the Ashramavasika Parva records that the sage Vyasa summoned the souls of those who had perished during the conflict. Among those present was the soul of Shakuni.

Later, the Svargarohanika Parva notes that after his death, Shakuni's soul rejoined Dvapara.

== In derivative literature ==
In subsequent literary works following the Mahabharata and in various narrative adaptations, Shakuni is depicted as a figure subjected to victimization, driven by a quest for vengeance against the Kurus. The Jain retellings narrate a legend asserting that astrologers predicted a short lifespan of Gandhari’s husband at her birth. To avert this fate, Subala and his sons ceremoniously married Gandhari to a goat before her marriage with Dhritarashtra, subsequently sacrificing the goat to nullify the foreseen misfortune. Bhishma, upon discovering this ritual, condemns Subala for allowing a supposed "widow" to enter his family and decides to punish Subala and his kin, leading to their imprisonment and severe rationing. The captives, recognizing Shakuni's intellect and vengeful potential, allocate their meager sustenance to him. Ultimately, Subala and his other sons succumb, while Shakuni survives and attains release. Alternatively, another account posits that Bhishma confined Shakuni's family due to their refusal to bestow Gandhari in marriage to the sightless Dhritarashtra, with Duryodhana sometimes replacing Bhishma in this role. The latter narrative is found in Odia Mahabharata, a regional retelling of the epic.

In all these narratives, Shakuni solemnly vows retribution, plotting the gradual demise of Hastinapura. He accomplishes this by manipulating his impulsive nephew Duryodhana into provoking the war with the Pandavas, resulting in the downfall of the Kuru lineage. Some versions of the tale depict Shakuni fashioning dice from the bones of his deceased family members, ensuring their infallibility in a game, as Shakuni's father's soul allegedly influences the dice to yield the desired outcome. However, these narratives contradict the narrative attested in the Mahabharata; Subala and his sons attended Yudhishthira’s Rajasuya yajna, while Shakuni’s brothers fought in the great war at Kurukshetra and five of them were killed during the conflict.
