= Baho Dheri =

Archeological site in Pakistan

- Location: Swabi District, Khyber Pakhtunkhwa, Pakistan

Site notes
- Owner: Government of Khyber Pakhtunkhwa
- Management: Directorate of Archeology and Museums, Khyber Pakhtunkhwa
- Public access: no

Baho Dheri is a Buddhist site in Swabi District of Khyber Pakhtunkhwa, Pakistan. According to archeologists, these artifacts are about 1800 years old and belongs from to the era of Gandhara Kingdom. As on date, more than 400 antiquities have been recovered. It is said to be the largest stupa in the area. Further excavations are underway.
