= Mausala Parva =

Sixteenth book of the Mahabharata

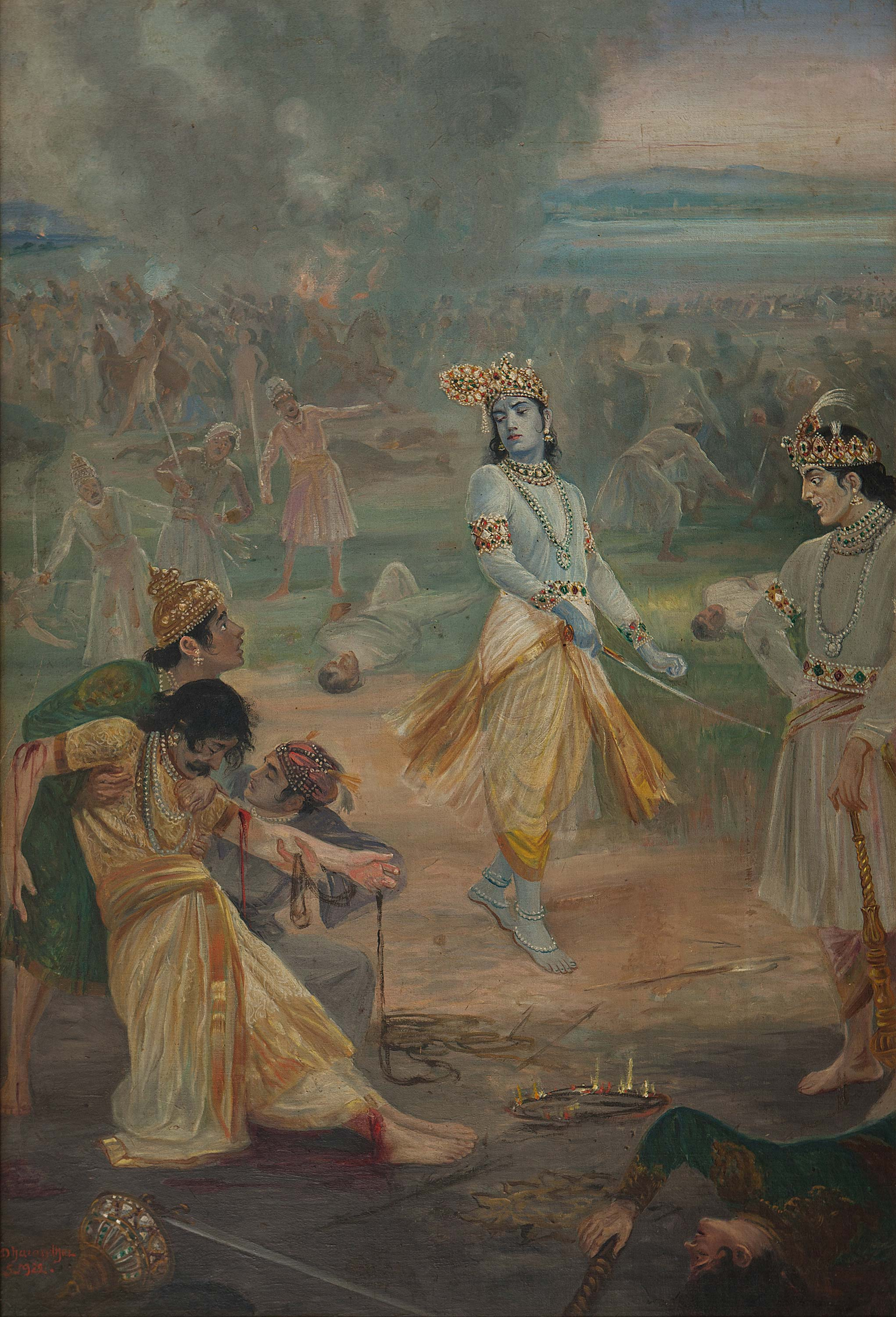
Yadavas killing themselves, with Krishna (blue figure) and his brother Balarama depicted at right. Painting by M. V. Dhurandhar

The Mausala Parva ("Episode of Flails") is the sixteenth of the eighteen parvas (books) of the Indian epic Mahabharata. It traditionally has nine chapters. The critical edition has eight chapters. It is one of the three shortest episodes within the epic.

The Mausala Parva describes the demise of Krishna in the 36th year after the Kurukshetra War had ended, the submersion of Dvaraka under the sea, the death of Balarama by drowning in the sea, Vasudeva's death, and a civil war fought among the Yadava clan that killed many of them. The story of infighting of the Yadavas becomes the reason why the Pandava brothers renounce their kingdom and begin their walk towards heaven, events recited in the last two books of the Mahabharata.

The Mausala Parva is significant for serving as a basis of archaeological studies for the Mahabharata, as well as being one of the eight Parvas found in Hindu culture of Java and Bali, Indonesia.

== Structure and chapters ==
The Mausala Parva traditionally has 9 adhyayas (chapters) but no secondary upa-parvas (parts, little books). The Mausala Parva represents about 0.25% of all 80,000 verses in the critical edition of the Mahabharata. This makes it one of the epic's smallest episodes.

=== Background to the Mausala Parva ===
After the end of the great Kurukshetra War, Gandhari confronted Krishna, a meeting described in the Stri Parva. In anger and grief over the death of her hundred sons, her brothers, and of other members of her clan, Gandhari cursed Krishna that his Yadava kinsmen too would die in a fratricidal strife.

=== Plot summary ===
The chapter begins with the announcement at the court of the Pandavas that many Yadava men were killed in an internecine war fought with flails made of eraká grass. Yudhishthira asks for details. Mausala Parva then recites the details.

The events start near the city of Dvārakā 36 years after the end of the Kurukshetra war. The kingdom is peaceful and prosperous, the youth of Yadavas have become frivolous and hedonistic. Krishna's son Samba dresses up as a woman and his friends meet the sages Vishvamitra, Durvasa, Vasishtha, Narada, and other rishis (sages), who were visiting Dvaraka for an audience with Krishna. The young man playfully pretended to be a woman and claimed that he is pregnant and asks the rishis to predict the gender of the baby.

One rishi sees through the prank. In a fit of rage, he curses that Samba will give birth to an iron bolt that will destroy his entire clan. The frightened youth inform Krishna about what had happened, Krishna was aware of the impending destruction of the Yadava clan and didn't wish to ordain or prevent it, Samba summoned and reported to Krishna and Ugrasena and it was asked to pulverize the iron bolt into a powder and cast it into the Prabhasa sea and to prevent the distribution of intoxicating spirits in the kingdom.

The city then witnesses several dark omens, including the disappearance of the Sudarshana Chakra, the Panchajanya (Krishna's conch), Krishna's chariot and the plough weapon of Balarama. Pests multiply. Sinful acts multiply, yet no one feels any shame. Wives deceive their husbands, and husbands deceive their wives. Everyone has the same terrifying dreams. People insult and humiliate their seniors and teachers. Krishna asks everyone to go on a pilgrimage to the sacred waters of the Prabhasa sea. They do. When they arrive, the Yadavas revel in merrymaking, dance and drink much alcohol.

Satyaki, inebriated with wine, goes over to Kritavarma, criticizes him for scheming with both Ashvatthama and Kripa and killing the remaining Pandavas' army while they were sleeping (see Sauptika Parva). Pradyumna (son of Krishna and Rukmini) applauds Satyaki's words and disregards Kritavarma. Kritavarma in return reminds Satyaki how he (Satyaki) along with Arjuna had cruelly slayed the unarmed Bhurishravas who, on the field of battle, sat in prayer. Krishna glances angrily at Kritavarma. They begin to argue about who did more wrong during the Kurukshetra War. In the ensuing fracas, Satyaki decapitates Kritavarma with his sword, then begins striking down others present there. Krishna runs over to prevent him from doing further violence. However, others are impelled by fate in the face of Krishna to slay Satyaki and Pradyumna, who tries to save Satyaki. Krishna beholding his own slain son Pradyumna as well as Satyaki, takes up, in wrath, erakā grass in his hand, which miraculously becomes a bolt of iron - it is with this iron rod that he begins to slay the violent. Others try to imitate him by plucking the grass, which transforms into iron bolts in their hands due to the curse. Everyone, inebriated with alcohol, attacks everyone else. Soon everyone who is battling is dead, except for Vabhru, Daruka (Krishna's charioteer) and Krishna. Balarama survives because he withdrew from that spot before the fight. Krishna asks Daruka to go to the Pandavas, tell them what had happened and to ask Arjuna to come with help. While Daruka was gone, Krishna sends Vabhru to protect the ladies of his kingdom from robbers tempted by wealth. However, as soon as he proceeds to a distance, an iron bolt flies and impales Vabhru, killing him. Krishna goes to Dvaraka and consoles his father Vasudeva, before returning to his brother Balarama in the forest. He sees him departing from this world, giving up his life through yoga. Krishna who had the foresight of everything that had happened, concludes that the hour of his departure from this world has come. Restraining his senses, he sits in high yoga. Some of the powder cast into the Prabhasa sea had been swallowed by a fish. Inside the fish, the powder had become a metal piece. Jara (skt. 'old age'), a hunter, catches that fish and finds the metal. He sharpens it to make an arrow and goes for hunting, during which, seeing red marks on Krishna's left foot, and mistaking it for a deer's eye, shoots the arrow at it. On approaching the supposed prey to capture it, he beheld Krishna rapt in yoga, and touches his feet for being an offender. Krishna comforts him and then ascends upwards to the heavens, filling the entire sky with splendor.

Daruka reaches to Pandavas and tells them the whole incident. Arjuna sets out for seeing them. He met there Vasudeva and 500,000 people who killed each other lying there. He tells them to prepare for their leave within a week. Vasudeva dies the next day while he is meditating, while his wives join him in a funeral pyre. Then Arjuna made rites who died there, according to their order of seniority. With Yadava old men, women and children who are the only survivors, including the 16,000 devotees (women who were saved by Krishna, from Narakasura and made into his queens) of Krishna, together set off for Indraprastha. As they are leaving, waters rise, Dvaraka sinks into the sea. Arjuna proceeded by slow marches, causing the Vrishni women to rest in pleasant forests, mountains and by the sides of delightful streams. Arrived at the country of five waters, they made an encampment there. Bandits overwhelmed by cupidity and temptation attack them, seeing them being protected by only one bowman. The son of Kunti, ceasing turned, with his followers, towards the place where bandits attacked. Smiling the while, Arjuna addresses them but they disregarded his words, fell upon him. With great difficulty, he succeeded in activating his bow. When the battle had become furious, he tries to invoke his celestial weapons, which did not appear at his bidding. The concourse was very large, the bandits assailed it at different points, Arjuna tries his best to protect it, but fails. In his very sight, ladies were dragged away, while some went away with bandits of their own accord, when they found none to save them. Supported by servants, Arjuna struck the bandits with his shafts sped from Gandiva bow, but soon however his inexhaustible quivers were out of shafts. Then afflicted with grief, he tries to fight with his bow, but until that time those bandits had retreated, taking ladies away with them. Arjuna regarded it all as the work of destiny, while thinking of his non-appearance of celestial weapons, refusal of his bow to obey him; and exhaustion of his shafts. Taking with him the remnant of the Vrishni women, and the wealth that was still with them, reached Kurukshetra. He installs warriors at different positions at different locations. Rukmini, Saivaya, Haimavatu, and Jambavati, ascended the funeral pyre. Satyabhama and others entered the woods to practice penances.

Arjuna becomes depressed and full of doubts about his warrior abilities. He approaches Vyasa, and explains how he feels for failing those that depended on him for their safety and security. Sage Vyasa explains that it was the destiny of those warriors, Krishna suffered it too, although he was competent to baffle the curses, Arjuna and his brothers have served the purpose of their lives, those weapons with which he achieved success no longer needs him, and had gone to the place from where they came from. So it is time for them to retire and renounce their kingdom. Arjuna takes leave of Vyasa, meets with Yudhishthira and tells them what had happened.

== English translations ==
Mausala Parva was composed in Sanskrit. Several translations in English are available. Two translations from the 19th century, now in public domain, are those by Kisari Mohan Ganguli and Manmatha Nath Dutt. The translations vary with each translator's interpretations.

Debroy, in 2011, notes that updated critical edition of Mausala Parva, after removing verses generally accepted so far as spurious and inserted into the original, has 9 adhyayas (chapters) and 273 shlokas (verses).

The entire parva has been "transcreated" and translated in verse by the poet Dr. Purushottama Lal published by Writers Workshop.

== Significance ==
=== Archaeological studies on the Mahabharata ===
The details in Mausala Parva have served as a source for scholarly studies on whether the Mahabharata is entirely fictional, or if it is partly based on an ancient war in India. The chapters in Mausala Parva that describe Dwarka, its submergence in the Prabhasa sea, and others episodes of the Mahabharata have attracted the attention of scholars. It has led to the hypothesis that if any city named Dwarka existed in ancient India, it is likely to have been in the modern Indian state of Gujarat or Maharashtra. With funding from the Government of India (GoI), the Archaeological Survey of India (ASI) and the National Institute of Oceanography conducted various studies since 1955, particularly since late 1970s. These studies found remnants of various temples in Gujarat, variously dated to be from 9th century, 1st century and 1st millennium BC. The studies have also found ceramic artifacts, votive jars with inscriptions praising the sea god at Bet Dwarka, an island near Dwarka, Gujarat. These have been dated to be between 500 BC and 1500 BC. Archaeological investigations at Dwarka, both on shore and offshore in the Arabian Sea, have been conducted by the ASI. The first investigations carried out on land in 1963 revealed many artifacts. The objective of the investigations conducted by the Marine Archaeology Unit of the National Institute of Oceanography and the Government of Gujarat was to reconstruct the history of maritime trade, shipbuilding and cultural status of the ancient city of Dwarka. Excavations done at two sites on the seaward side of Dwarka brought to light submerged settlements, a stone-built jetty of large size and triangular stone anchors with three holes. The settlements are in the form of exterior and interior walls, and fort bastions.

=== Chronology and spread of Mahabharata ===
Mausala Parva is one of the eight books that were discovered in parts of Indonesia. In islands of Indonesia, Dutch colonial officials discovered the Epic to consist of only eight books, instead of eighteen. It is unclear if this implies the original Epic had only eight books as and when it arrived in Indonesia, or some books were lost as the Epic spread in Southeast Asia. D. Van Hinloopen Labberton reports the eight parvas as: Adi, Virata, Udyoga, Bhishma, Ashramavasika, Mausala, Mahaprasthanika and Svargarohana.

== See also ==
- Previous book of Mahabharata: Ashramavasika Parva
- Next book of Mahabharata: Mahaprasthanika Parva
