= Ananda Lal =

Indian academic and theatre critic (born 1955)

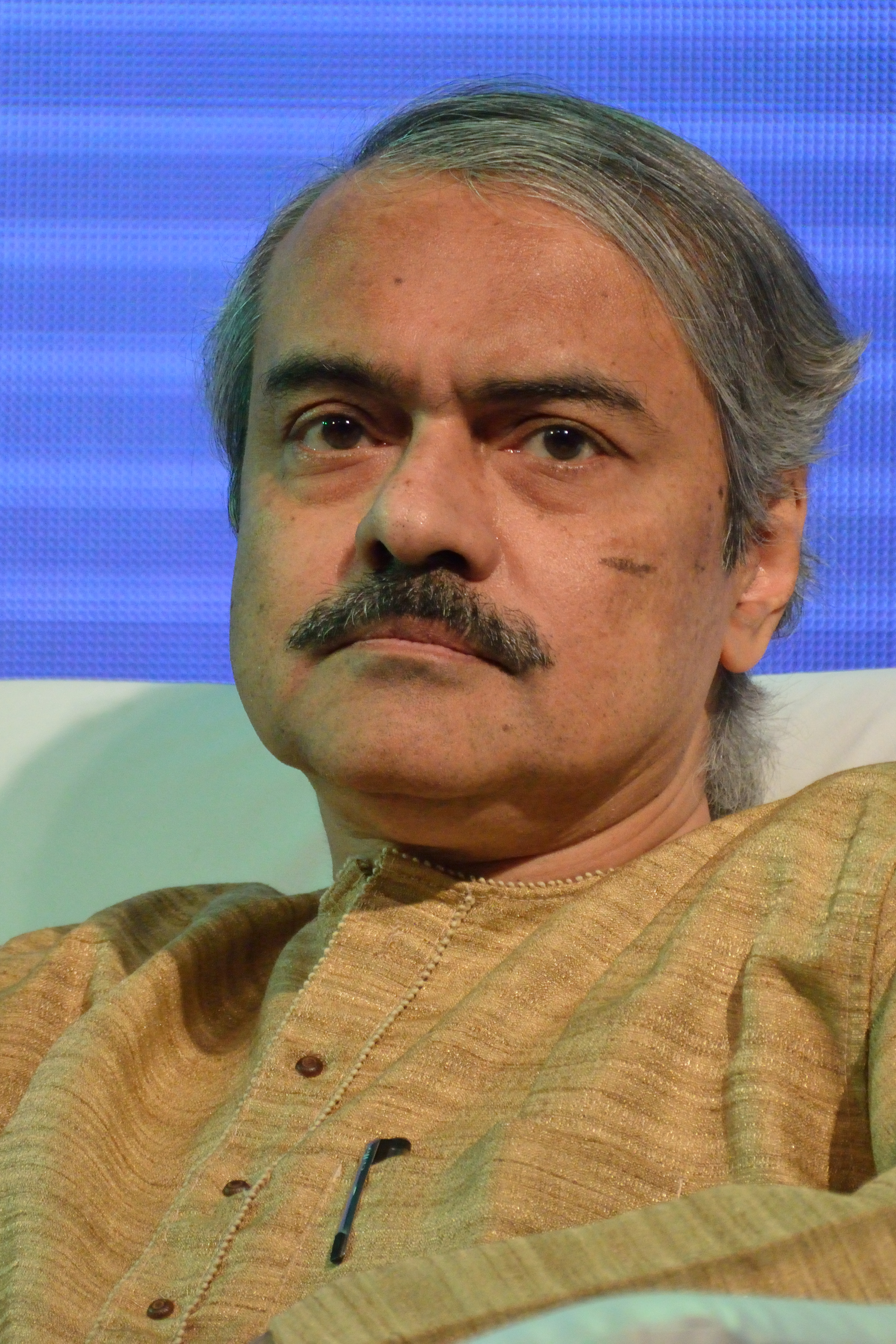
- Ananda Lal in 2016
- Born: Ananda Lal; 1955 (age 70–71); Calcutta, India
- Known for: Theatre
- Spouse: Swati Lal
- Children: 2
- Parent(s): Purushottama Lal; Shyamasree Devi
- Relatives: Srimati Lal (sister); Kalidas Nag (maternal grandfather)
- Website: https://kolkatatheatre.com/

Ananda Lal (born 1955) is an Indian academic and theatre critic. He is the son of Purushottama Lal, founder of Writers Workshop, one of India's oldest creative writing publishers, established in 1958. He is a former Professor of English and Coordinator, Rabindranath Tagore Studies Centre (UGC), at Jadavpur University, Calcutta and has now retired from active service. He is currently writing for Kolkata Theatre (https://kolkatatheatre.com). He currently heads Writers Workshop, translates from Bengali to English, is a theatre critic for The Times of India (Calcutta). While he was a professor at Jadavpur, he regularly directed plays for the Department of English with students in the cast and crew.

His books include "Indian Drama in English: The Beginnings" (2019), the "Oxford Companion to Indian Theatre" (2004, the first reference work in any language on that subject), "Rabindranath Tagore: Three Plays" (1987 and 2001, the first full-length study in English of Tagorean drama), "Theatres of India" (2009), "Twist in the Folktale" (2004), "Shakespeare on the Calcutta Stage" (2001) and "Rasa: The Indian Performing Arts" (1995). He now runs a website called Kolkata Theatre.

== Early life and education ==
Born in 1955 in Calcutta, India, to P. Lal and Shyamasree Devi, he was educated at St Xavier's School, Presidency College, which was then affiliated with the University of Calcutta, and at the University of Illinois, USA. His younger sister was the artist and poet Srimati Lal.

== Career ==
He served as Head, Department of English (2007-9), and previously taught in the Department of Comparative Literature (1991–93), at Jadavpur University, Calcutta; the Department of English, University of Calcutta (1989–91); and the Department of Theatre, University of Illinois (1981–86). A Cambridge Fellow (1994) and Fulbright Fellow (2005), he has lectured widely in the US, Canada, UK, Europe, Australia and, of course, India.

He has contributed articles to such prestigious international reference projects as "India Today: An Encyclopedia" (ABC-Clio, 2011), "Understanding Contemporary India" (Lynne Rienner, 2010), "Encyclopedia of India" (Charles Scribner's, 2005), "Oxford Encyclopedia of Theatre and Performance" (2003), "Continuum Companion to Twentieth Century Theatre" (2002), Microsoft Encarta Encyclopedia (on CD-ROM, 2000), "Encyclopedia of Post-Colonial Literatures in English" (Routledge, 1994, 2005) and "Critical Survey of Drama" (Salem, 1986). He has published over 40 essays in various books and journals, and over 1000 reviews in Indian newspapers and periodicals.

He conceptualized and provided the introduction, commentary and translated texts for a CD of Tagore's own audio recordings, titled The Voice of Rabindranath Tagore (Hindusthan, 1997). He is an active translator of Bengali poetry, contributing to the 'Oxford Tagore Translations' while also publishing translations of Jibanananda Das. He taught the course titled Translation Studies in the postgraduate syllabus of the English Department.

Lal has directed thirty theatre productions, many of them for Jadavpur University where he taught Drama in Practice, an optional course for students of the Department of English, and worked in another twenty productions, including such internationally acclaimed successes as Tim Supple's "Midsummer Night's Dream". He has a 30-year portfolio in television and film as an scriptwriter, researcher, commentator, narrator and subtitler, and has been interviewed by BBC, Radio Nederland and UGC-Doordarshan.

Dr. Lal is Calcutta's leading theatre critic. He wrote a regular drama column in The Telegraph from 1986 to 2018, and since then for the "Times of India". He was chosen Best Theatre Researcher, 2000, by the Drama Academy of India.
