= Mahaprasthanika Parva =

Seventeenth book of the Mahabharata

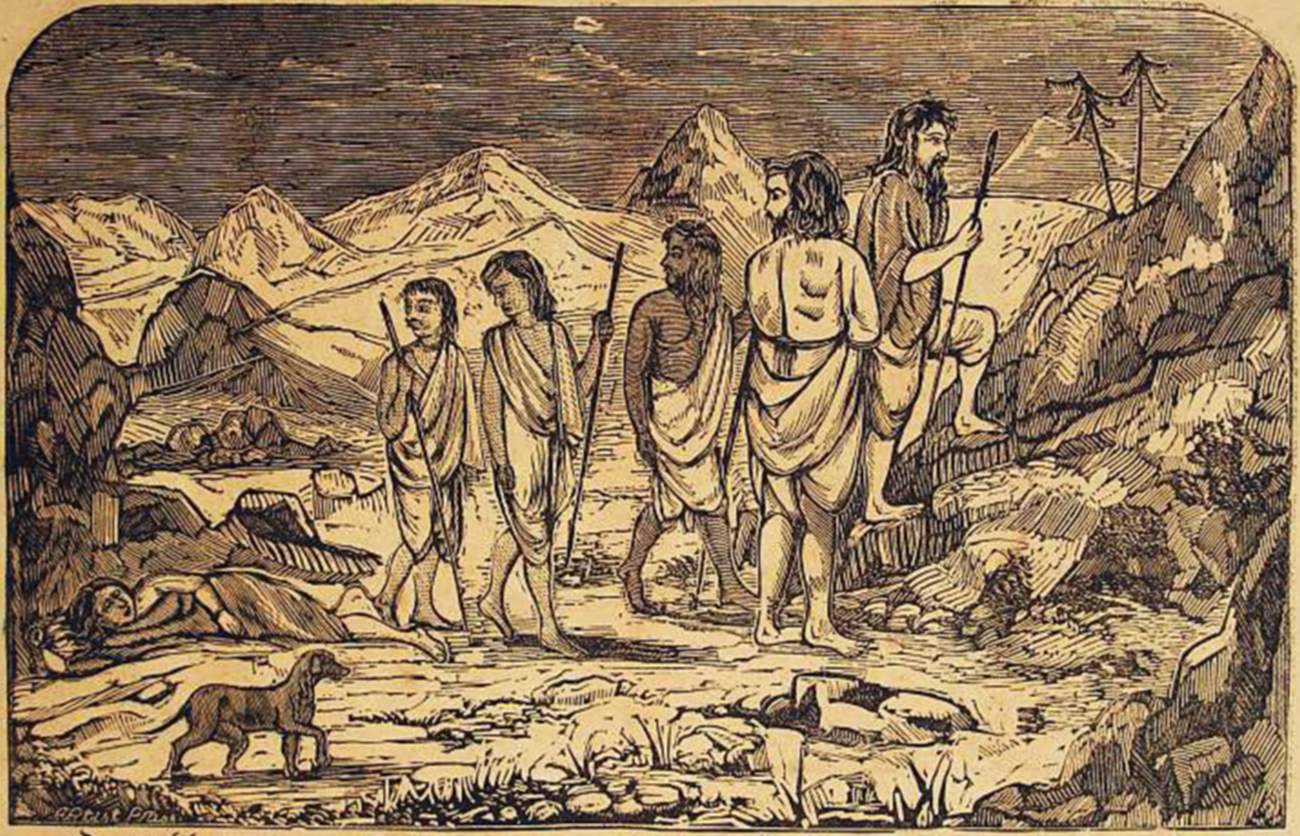
19th-century illustration depicting the death of Draupadi and the Pandava brothers' final journey through the Himalayas towards Mount Meru, accompanied by a dog.

The Mahaprasthanika Parva (Sanskrit: महाप्रस्थानिक पर्व, lit. 'Book of the Great Journey') is the seventeenth of the eighteen parvas (books) of the Hindu epic Mahabharata. It traditionally has three chapters, as does the critical edition. It is the shortest book in the epic.

Mahaprasthanika Parva recites the journey of the Pandavas across India and finally their ascent towards Himalayas, as they climb their way to Svarga (heaven) on Mount Meru. As they leave their kingdom, a stray dog befriends them and joins their long journey. On their way, Draupadi dies first. Four of the Pandava brothers also die midway. Only Yudhishthira and the dog reach Mount Meru. Their conversations, and reasons for not reaching heaven are described in Mahaprasthanika Parva.

== Structure and chapters ==
The Mahaprasthanika Parva has three adhyayas (chapters) but no secondary upa-parvas (parts, little books). It is the smallest book of the epic.

=== Background ===
At the end of Mausala Parva, Vyasa advises Arjuna and his four brothers to retire and renounce their kingdom as the purpose of their life has been served. Arjuna informs Yudhishthira of Vyasa's advice, and his brothers agree as does Draupadi.

=== Summary ===
Yudhishthira crowns Parikshit his successor as King of Hastinapur, with Yuyutsu as regent. In Indraprastha, the Yadava Prince Vajra is crowned king. The five brothers and Draupadi then start their journey through India and the Himalayas.

As the Pandavas leave, a dog befriends them and they take him along for the journey. The Pandavas first 'set out with their faces towards the east', reaching the lauhityaṃ salilārṇavam (literally, the "red waters", possibly the Brahmaputra, one of whose names is "Lohit"). There, the god Agni appears before them, commanding Arjuna to return the bow Gandiva, which he had borrowed from the god Varuna for the burning of the Khandava Forest. Agni says the celestial bow was asked by him from Varuna for the use of Partha. Urged by his brothers, Arjuna threw both the bow and the inexhaustible quivers into the waters. They then turn south, reaching the sea, then proceed up the west coast of India until they reach Dvārakā. They see it submerged by the sea, as described by Arjuna in Mausala Parva, the sight of a beautiful place drowned and dead making them depressed. They turn north, stop at Rishikesh, then cross the Himalayas.

As they cross the Himalayas, Yajnaseni is the first of their party to die. Bhima asks Yudhishthira why Draupadi died early and couldn't continue on the journey to heaven. Yudhishthira claims though they all were equal unto her, she had great partiality for Dhananjaya (Arjuna), so she obtained the fruit of her conduct today. The remaining Pandavas continue their journey, and Sahadeva is the next to die. Yudhishthira explains Sahadeva, like his other brothers was virtuous in every respect, except he suffered from the vice of pride and vanity, thinking none were his equal in wisdom. The brothers continue on to Mount Meru, and Nakula dies next. Yudhishthira explains Nakula had also suffered from the vice of pride and vanity, thinking he was the most handsome person in the world. Arjuna is the next person to die without completing the journey. Yudhishthira explains to Bhima how Arjuna suffered from the vice of pride and vanity, in his case thinking he was the most skilled and powerful hero over all others. Yudhishthira, Bhima, and the loyal dog continue forward.

Bhima tires and falls down, and so asks Yudhishthira why he is also unable to complete the journey towards heaven. Yudhishthira explains to his brother of the latter’s vice of gluttony, eating much while unmindful of others’ hunger, alongside his own vice of pride and vanity concerning his immense strength.

Yudhishthira and his dog greeted by Indra and Matali during their ascent to heaven.

Yudhishthira and the dog continue alone on their journey. As they ascend Mount Meru in Chapter 3, Indra appears in his chariot with a loud sound, suggesting Yudhishthira need not walk all the way, and hitch a ride to heaven. Yudhishthira refuses, says he could not go to heaven with Indra without his four brothers and Draupadi. Indra replies that all of them had entered heaven, but when Yudhishthira asks if the dog can jump into the car first, Indra says the animal may not. Yudhishthira refuses to leave the dog, claiming the dog is his friend, and to betray his friend during his life's journey would be a great sin. Indra questions why, after abandoning his late brothers and their common wife he had acquired great merit, and yet when stupefied by a dog, would renounce everything. Yudhishthira replied there is neither friendship nor enmity with the dead, hence he abandoned his brothers and Draupadi when unable to revive them. However, he could not bring himself to abandon the still-living dog. Indra urges him to consider his own happiness by abandoning the dog and hopping into his chariot. Yudhishthira still refuses to ride the chariot, explaining he cannot leave the living dog, who was his companion for his own happiness. The dog, watching Yudhishthira's commitment towards himself, manifests in his true form as the deity Dharma. He praises Yudhishthira for his virtues, and recalls that Yudhishthira had previously been tested in the forest of Dwaita, where he disregarded his love for his brothers and chose to revive Nakula, in order to honor his obligation to his stepmother. Again on this occasion, believing in the dog's devotion towards him, he had renounced the very chariot of the gods in front of him. For this, he had no equal in heaven, having earned regions of great felicity. They then proceed towards heaven, and on the way meet the sage Narada who Yudhishthira had transcended the achievements of even royal sages, and how he has not known of anyone else ascending to heaven with a human body. Yudhishthira, a king of righteous soul, salutes the deities and finally enters heaven aboard Indra's chariot.

== English translations ==
Mahaprasthanika Parva was composed in Sanskrit. Several translations in English are available. Two translations from 19th century, now in public domain, are those by Kisari Mohan Ganguli and Manmatha Nath Dutt. The translations vary with each translator's interpretations.

Debroy, in 2011, notes that updated critical edition of Mahaprasthanika Parva, after removing verses generally accepted so far as spurious and inserted into the original, has 3 adhyayas (chapters) and 106 shlokas (verses).

The entire parva has been "transcreated" and translated in verse by the poet Dr. Purushottama Lal published by Writers Workshop.

== Quotes and teachings ==
Mahaprasthanika Parva, Chapter 3:

I never give up a person that is terrified,
nor one that is devoted to me,
nor one that seeks my protection,
nor one who is afflicted or destitute,
nor one that is weak in protecting oneself,
I shall never give up such a one till my own life is at an end.

— Yudhishthira, Mahaprasthanika Parva, Mahabharata Book xvii.3

== See also ==
- Previous book of Mahabharata: Mausala Parva
- Next book of Mahabharata: Svargarohana Parva
