= Srimati Lal =

Indian artist and curator (1959–2019)

- Born: Srimati Priyadarshini Lal; 1959; Calcutta, West Bengal, India
- Died: 2019 (aged 59–60)
- Known for: Painting, Poetry
- Notable work: "The Window", "Flowers for my Father"
- Movement: Naïve art
- Spouse: Jit Kumar (m. 2008)
- Partner(s): F. N. Souza (1993–2002)
- Father: Purushottama Lal
- Relatives: Ananda Lal (brother); Kalidas Nag (grandfather)
- Website: srimatilal.com

Srimati Priyadarshini Lal (1959 – 2019) was an Indian artist, poet, writer, art critic, art authenticator and curator. She held over twenty exhibitions of her work internationally. She was the author of three books of poetry: The Window (Writers Workshop, 1986), Six Poems (London, 1997) and The Warriors: I Guerrieri, published in English and Italian (London, 2006). Srimati Lal also wrote about F. N. Souza and India's Contemporary Art Movement for the volume Culture, Society and Development in India (2009). She published an anthology of Indo-Anglian writers dedicated to Purushottama Lal, Flowers For My Father: Tributes to P. Lal (2011).

== Early life and education ==
Srimati Lal was born in Kolkata. She was the daughter of Purushottama Lal, the founder of Writers Workshop as well as a renowned poet and transcreator of the Mahabharata, and his wife Shyamasree Devi. Her elder brother was Ananda Lal.

She studied at Loreto House. She was the gold medallist in the Bachelor of Arts program in English Literature at Presidency University, where she was also the Ishan Scholar. Her dissertation for her Liberal Arts program Film as a Narrative Form at Western Maryland College (since renamed as McDaniel College) entitled 'The Film Vision of Satyajit Ray', was granted a High First and Magna Cum Laude status by Prof. William Cipolla, Dean of Film Studies at New York University.

== Career ==
Lal conducted media interviews with various Bengali cultural figures, including Satyajit Ray and Vikram Seth.

She was an authenticator and authority on Indian Contemporary Art. As an artist herself, Lal evolved an individual style which juxtaposed her creative writings and poetry with her art. Tagore, Khalil Gibran, Blake, Dante Gabriel Rossetti and the Scroll-Patachitra painters and indigenous folk-artists of India were some of her major inspirations.

Lal was involved in detailed visual and textual documentations of Indian indigenous art, crafts, and design. She taught art and craft at Bengal's ashrams and worked as a designer, a calligraphist, and an illustrator of books of poetry and fiction, including Dragons by Kewlian Sio; The Saffron Cat, The Magic Mango Tree, The Mahabharata and The Three Riddles by her father P. Lal; The Window and The Warriors by herself; and several other publications.

As an art critic writing weekly art columns since the 1980s, Lal contributed articles on contemporary art to newspapers and journals, such as the Times of India, Indian Express, Hindustan Times, The Telegraph, The Pioneer, Tehelka, Seminar, Art Etc., The Statesman, The Asian Age, SUNDAY Magazine, Poetry Chain, Confluence of London, and Friday Gurgaon.

In 2004, Lal was among various Indian artists invited by the Genesis Art Gallery in Kolkata to produce a modern interpretation of the Mona Lisa by Leonardo da Vinci. Her contemporary version was a work of digital art, which placed the image of Mona Lisa on a series of computer screens receding into one another. This work was also among the paintings displayed in an exhibition in Paris in 2006 to commemorate 500 years of the original Mona Lisa.

Lal held a major retrospective of twenty years of her paintings and poetry at London's Nehru Centre in June 2006, where her collector's-edition illustrated volume of poetry and paintings, The Warriors: I Guerrieri was formally released.

Lal's essay, The Language of Contemporary Indian Art: Souza as Paradigm, for the Indian sociological reference-volume Culture, Society and Development in India (2009), provides an understanding of F. N. Souza's oeuvre as the founder of India's Post-Independence Contemporary Art Movement.

Lal wrote exhibition catalogues, authentications and analytical studies of leading contemporary artists, including Ram Kumar ('Symphony to Survival': Vadehra Art Gallery, 1990s); Arpita Singh (Centre for Contemporary Art, 1990s); J. Swaminathan ('A Totem of Lost Meanings': Gallery Espace, 1990s); Mona Rai (Gallery Espace, 1990s); Jit Kumar ('Mysteries and Meditations': Galaxy Gallery, 2012); and Francis Newton Souza (over a dozen exhibitions and expositions curated by Lal from 1993–2012).

Lal also analysed, critiqued, verified and documented the works of other Indian and international artists, including Jamini Roy, Rabindranath Tagore, Amrita Shergil, Gopal Ghose, Nandalal Bose, Abanindranath Tagore, Ganesh Pyne, Paritosh Sen, S. H. Raza, Sakti Burman, Manjit Bawa, Vivan Sundaram, Krishen Khanna, Gurcharan Singh, Anupam Sud, Trupti Patel, Maite Delteil, Shahabuddin Ahmed, Jannis Markopoulos of Berlin, Tamara de Laval of Sweden, Olivia Fraser of India and London and Dhokra sculptor Rajib Kumar Maiti.

Lal died at the age of 60 years, on 17 November 2019.

== Personal life ==
Lal met the modern artist Francis Newton Souza in 1993 and was his mistress in his final years. She organized his funeral when he died in 2002. In 2008, Lal married Jit Kumar, an art-photographer, photo-journalist and documentary film-maker. They lived and worked in India.
