= F. N. Souza =

Indian artist (1924–2002)

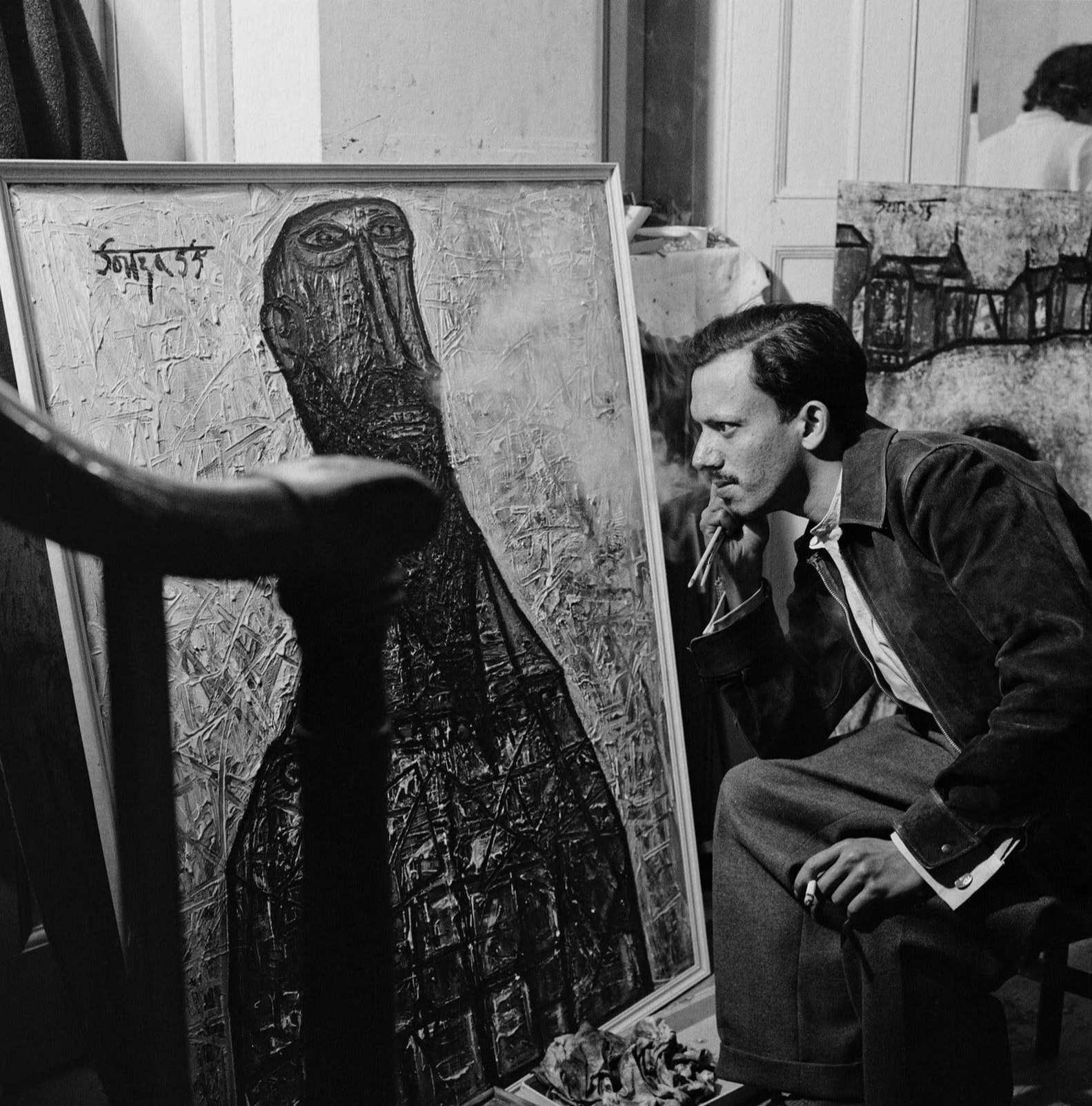
- Souza in London, 1955
- Born: Francisco Victor Newton de Souza; 12 April 1924; Saligão, Goa, Portuguese India
- Died: 28 March 2002 (aged 77); Mumbai, Maharashtra, India
- Burial place: Sewri Christian Cemetery
- Citizenship: Portuguese (until 1961); Indian (from 1961)
- Known for: Painting, Drawing
- Notable work: Birth (1955)
- Political party: Communist Party of India
- Movement: Expressionism
- Spouse: Maria Figueiredo (m. 1946; div. 1964) Barbara Zinkant (m. 1965; div. 1977)
- Partner(s): Liselotte Kristian (1954–1961); Srimati Lal (1993–2002)
- Children: 5
- Relatives: Lancelot Ribeiro (half-brother); Solomon Souza (grandson)

Francisco Victor Newton de Souza (12 April 1924 – 28 March 2002), better known as F. N. Souza, was an Indian artist of modern Indian painting, and a founding member of the Bombay Progressive Artists' Group. His style exhibited both decadence and primitivism.

== Early life and education ==
Francisco Victor Newton de Souza was born to Goan Catholic parents in the village of Saligão, Portuguese Goa. After his father and then his elder sister died, he and his mother moved to Bombay, British India, in 1929. His father's death from pneumonia when Souza was only three months old instilled a lifelong sense of abandonment that, according to his son Francis Patrick Souza, deeply influenced the illusory and emotional nature of his later art. Souza's mother Lilia remarried, and his half-brother was the painter Lancelot Ribeiro.

Souza attended St. Xavier's College in Bombay, but he was expelled in 1939 for drawing obscene graffiti in the restrooms. He then studied at the Sir J. J. School of Art in Bombay but was also expelled from that school in 1945, because of pulling down the Union Jack flag during a school ceremony and participating in the Quit India Movement. Souza joined the Communist Party of India soon after, and co-founded the Bombay Progressive Artists' Group in 1947.

== Move to London ==
In 1948, Souza's paintings were shown in London's Burlington House as part of an exhibition on Indian Art. However, his work was attacked by the Goan community in Bombay during an exhibition at Chemould Frames. Souza emigrated to London in 1949, following several complaints against him to the police from the Indian public for obscenity.

He initially struggled to make an impact as an artist in the UK. His Goan wife Maria took on multiple jobs in order to support their family. The Institute of Contemporary Arts included his work in a 1954 exhibition.

His success as an artist took off following the publication in 1955 of his autobiographical essay Nirvana of a Maggot in English poet Stephen Spender's Encounter magazine. Spender introduced Souza to the British art dealer Victor Musgrave. Souza's 1955 exhibit at Musgrave's Gallery One sold out, leading to ongoing success. Souza was one of five artists on the UK shortlist for the 1958 Guggenheim International Award for his 1955 painting Birth.

In 1959, Souza published his autobiographical Words and Lines.

Souza's career developed steadily, and he participated in several shows, receiving positive reviews from English art critic John Berger. According to Berger, Souza's style "was deliberately eclectic: essentially Expressionist in character", but "also drawing on the post-war Art Brut movement and elements of British Neo-romanticism".

== Reputation ==
The Indian artist, M.F. Husain, recognized Souza as his mentor. In recent years, Souza's paintings have been sold for over a million dollars. His painting Birth (1955) depicting his mistress Liselotte posing naked while pregnant with their first daughter Keren, set a world auction record in 2008 for the most expensive "Indian" painting sold till then when it was purchased by Tina Ambani for US$2.5 million (Rs 11.3 crore) at a Christie's auction. In 2015, the painting Birth was resold to Kiran Nadar at Christie's in New York, fetching more than US$4 million.

In June 2010, Christie's held an auction of over 140 lots from the Souza estate. Many of Souza's works fetched very high prices, some several times Christie's estimates.

At an auction of Souza's painting The Last Supper (1990) held by Sotheby's in 2019, his former muse and fellow artist Nimisha Sharma interrupted the auction after the bidding had ended. She asked repeatedly who was the artist’s “+” in his signature for that painting. Observers later speculated it was her way of telling the art world that she had painted it along with him.

== Personal life ==
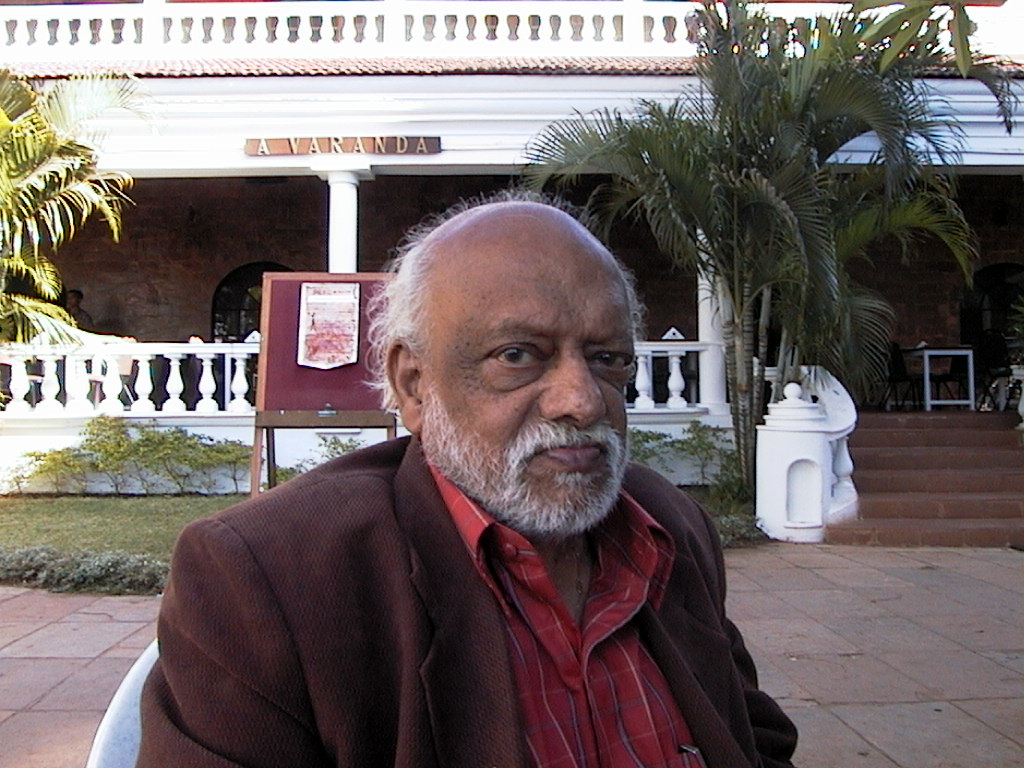
Souza seen in Goa shortly before his death.

Souza met a Goan fashion designer Maria Figueiredo in 1945. They married soon after and had a daughter together. In 1954, Souza met Liselotte Kristian Kohn, a married Jewish actress and Progressive League member, with whom he began a relationship. They had three daughters together but they never got married: Souza remained married to Maria, while Liselotte remained married to Richard. They also aborted a pregnancy in 1959, Souza thereby being automatically excommunicated from the Catholic Church.

Souza's relationship with Liselotte ended in 1961, with Liselotte alleging domestic violence. He divorced Maria in 1964 in order to marry the 16-year-old Barbara Zinkant. He and Barbara moved to New York City in 1967 and their son was born in 1971. Barbara divorced Souza in 1977 in order to marry her lover.

Souza divided his time between India and the United States after his second divorce. He was in several relationships, including a young married woman from Bombay, and had sexual relationships with multiple prostitutes. The Indian artist and poet Srimati Lal was in a relationship with him from 1993 until his death.

Souza's eldest daughter by his partner Liselotte Kristian is the British-Israeli painter Karen (Keren) Souza-Kohn. Karen's son is the British-Israeli street artist Solomon Souza, known best for his murals in the Mahane Yehuda Market. Anya Souza, his youngest daughter by Liselotte, was born with Down syndrome and is a trustee of the Down Syndrome Association, known for speaking out against the 2003 International Down Syndrome Screening Conference at Regents College in London.

== Death ==
Souza died on 28 March 2002 from a heart attack. Only a few people attended the funeral, none of them being his family members or members of Souza's Goan community. His remains were buried in Sewri Christian Cemetery in Mumbai.

== Public collections ==
- Birmingham Museum of Art, UK
- British Museum, London, UK
- Clifton Park Museum, Rotherham, UK
- Glenbarra Art Museum, Himeji, Hyōgo, Japan
- Haifa Museum, Israel
- National Gallery of Modern Art, New Delhi, India
- National Gallery of Victoria, Melbourne, Australia
- Tate Gallery, London, UK
- Progressive Art Gallery, New Delhi, India
- Victoria and Albert Museum, London, UK
- The Hepworth Wakefield Art Gallery, UK
- Museum of Biblical Art (Dallas), Texas, USA
- Sarmaya Arts Foundation, Fort, Mumbai.
