= Shanti Parva =

Twelfth book of the Mahabharata

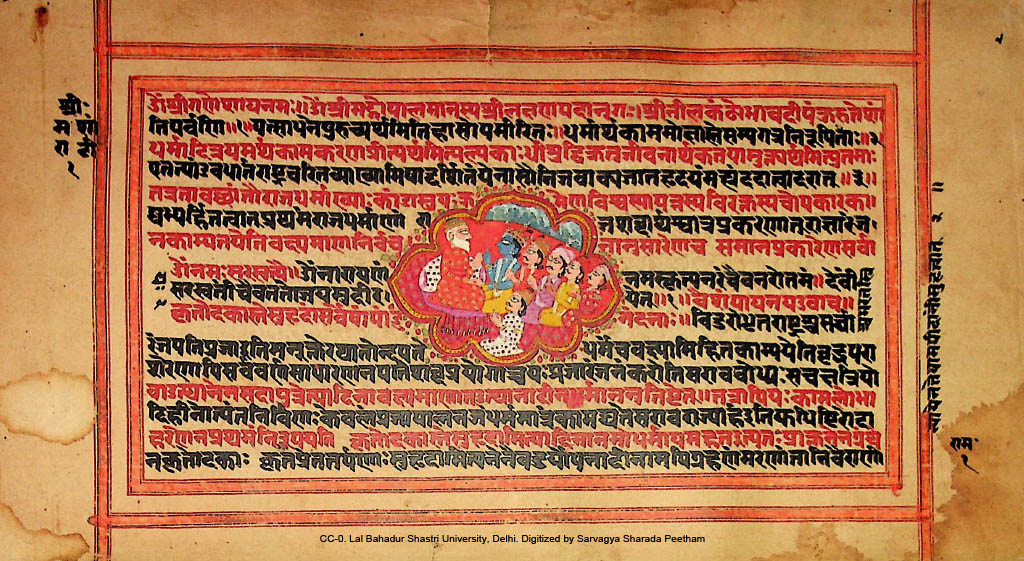
Illustrated Shanti Parva manuscript

The Shanti Parva (Sanskrit: शान्ति पर्व; IAST: Śānti parva) ("Book of Peace") is the twelfth of the eighteen parvas (books) of the Indian epic Mahabharata. It traditionally has three parts and 365 chapters. The critical edition has three parts and 353 chapters. It is the longest book among the eighteen books of the epic.

The book is set after the war is over— the two sides have accepted peace and Yudhishthira starts his rule of the Pandava kingdom. The Shanti parva recites the duties of the ruler, dharma and good governance, as counseled by the dying Bhishma and various Rishis. The parva includes many fables such as that of "the fowler and pigeons". The book also provides what some have described as a "theory of varna" as well as a comparative discussion between a rule of truth versus a rule of rituals, declaring truth to be far superior over rituals. Shanti parva has been widely studied for its treatises on jurisprudence, prosperity and success.

Scholars have questioned whether parts or all of the parva was inserted or interpolated at a later age.

== Structure and chapters ==
The Shanti Parva traditionally has 3 upa-parvas (parts, little books) and 365 adhyayas (chapters). The following are the sub-parvas:

1. Rajadharma-anusasana Parva (chapters: 1–130) – describes the duties of kings and leaders, among other things
2. Apaddharma-anusasana Parva (chapters: 131–173) – describes the rules of conduct when one faces adversity
3. Moksha-dharma Parva (chapters: 174–365) – describes behavior and rules to achieve moksha (emancipation, release, freedom)

Shanti parva begins with sorrowful Yudhishthira lamenting the loss of human lives during the war. The great Rishis came to see that monarch, among them Vyasa, Narada, Devala, Devasthana and Kanwa. Yudhishthira grieves for loss of his kinsmen and especially for his elder brother, Karna. He says that for gaining kingdom, unwittingly, he caused his brother to be slain. He says that if he had both Karna and Arjuna aiding him, he could have vanquished the gods himself. He asks Narada who was acquainted with everything of world, why the car wheel stuck and his brother was cursed.

Narada says that nothing could resist Karna and Arjuna in battle. And what he is about to tell him is unknown to the very gods. He tell him how Kunti conceived that child and latter he had status of Suta, how when refused by Drona for Brahma weapon, he met with Parshurama, how he obtained celestial weapons by serving Parshurama, how he was cursed by a Brahmin for killing his cow unwitting, by Parshurama for lying, and by goddess earth, how he came to be friends with Duryodhana, how when Duryodhana abducted the maiden of Kalingas with force, Karna defended him from the other kings, how when king Jarasandha challenged him to a single combat he fought with him, how when he was about to sever his antagonist body into two pieces, spared him from desire of friendship. From friendship he gave unto Karna the town Malini & Champa, and made him famous for his valour.

When for their good, the Lord of the celestials begged Karna for his natural coat of mail and ear-rings, stupefied he gave away those precious possessions. Deprived of his armor and ear-rings, in consequence of Brahmana's curse as also of the illustrious Parshurama, of the boon granted to Kunti, of illusion practised on him by Indra, of his depreciation by Bhishma as only half a car-warrior, of destruction of his energy caused by Shalya keen speeches, of Vasudeva's policy, and lastly of the celestial weapons given to Arjuna of Rudra, Indra, Yama, Varuna, Kuvera, Drona and Kripa, with these the wielder of Gandiva succeeded in slaying, that tiger among men, Vikartana's son Karna, of effulgence like that of sun. Having said these words, the celestial Rishi Narada became silent. Yudhishthira griefs, shedding copious tears and Kunti consoles him.

Yudhishthira announces his desire to renounce the kingdom, move into a forest as a mendicant and live in silence. He receives counsel from his family and then sages Narada and Vyasa, as well as Devala, Devasthana and Kanwa. The parva includes the story of king Janaka and the queen of the Videhas, presenting the theory of true mendicant as one who does not crave for material wealth, not one who abandons material wealth for an outward show. Arjuna argues it is more virtuous to create and maintain virtuous wealth and do good with it, than to neither create nor have any. Yudhishthira challenges Arjuna how would he know. Sage Vyasa then intervenes and offers arguments from Vedas that support Arjuna's comments, and the story of Sankha and Likhita. Krishna concurs with Arjuna and Vyasa, and adds his own arguments. Vasudeva then tells him to approach Bhishma who was in his bed of arrows and question him about knowledge of life and duties of the four orders, before he disappears. They all go and meet with Bhishma, where Krishna relieves Bhishma from pain using his power and Bhishma gives them lecture about duties of a king, further days.

Shanti parva recites a theory of governance and duties of a leader. This theory is outlined by dying Bhishma to Yudhishthira and his brothers (shown), as well as words from sage Vidura.

Shanti parva is a treatise on duties of a king and his government, dharma (laws and rules), proper governance, rights, justice and describes how these create prosperity. Yudhishthira becomes the king of a prosperous and peaceful kingdom, Bhima his heir apparent, sage Vidura the prime minister, Sanjaya the finance minister, Arjuna the defense and justice minister, and Dhaumya is appointed one responsible to service priests and counsels to the king. This books also includes a treatise on yoga as recited by Krishna.

== English translations ==
Shanti Parva was composed in Sanskrit. Several translations of the book in English are available. Two translations from 19th century, now in public domain, are those by Kisari Mohan Ganguli and Manmatha Nath Dutt. The translations vary with each translator's interpretations.

Clay Sanskrit Library has published a 15 volume set of the Mahabharata which includes a translation of Shanti Parva by Alex Wynne.

Debroy, in 2011, notes that updated critical edition of Shanti Parva, after removing verses and chapters generally accepted so far as spurious and inserted into the original, has 3 parts, 353 adhyayas (chapters) and 13,006 shlokas (verses).

The entire parva has been "transcreated" and translated in 2 volumes by the poet Dr. Purushottama Lal (Rajadharma-anusasana and Apaddharma-anusasana parvas) and his student, Dr. Pradeep Bhattachaarya (Moksha-dharma parva) in verse, published in 2015 by Writers Workshop.

James L. Fitzgerald published his translation of the Shantiparvan, with University of Chicago Press, in two volumes, in 2003 and 2026, respectively.

== Salient features ==
Shanti parva - the longest book and most number of verses - has a number of treatises and fables embedded in it. Examples include a theory on caste, a theory on governance, and the fable of the wicked fowler and compassionate pigeons.

=== View on caste ===
Chapters 188 and 189 of the parva begin by reciting Bhrigu's theory of varna, according to whom Brahmins were white, Kshatriyas red, Vaishyas yellow, and Shudras black. Rishi Bharadwaja asks how can castes be discriminated when in truth all colors are observed in every class of people, when in truth people of all groups experience the same desire, same anger, same fear, same grief, same fatigue, same hunger, same love and other emotions? Everyone is born the same way, carries blood and bile, and dies the same way, asserts Bharadwaja. Why do castes exist, asks Bharadwaja? Bhrigu replies there is no difference among castes. It arose because of differentiation of work. Duty and rites of passage are not forbidden to any of them. According to John Muir, Shanti Parva and its companion book Anushasana Parva claim neither birth, nor initiation, nor descent, nor bookish knowledge determines a person's merit; only their actual conduct, expressed qualities and virtues determine one's merit. There is no superior caste, claims Shanti parva.

=== Shanti parva on governance ===
The parva dedicates over 100 chapters on duties of a king and rules of proper governance. A prosperous kingdom must be guided by truth and justice. Chapter 58 of Shanti parva suggests the duty of a ruler and his cabinet is to enable people to be happy, pursue truth and act sincerely. Chapter 88 recommends the king to tax without injuring the ability or capacity of citizens to provide wealth to monarchy, just like bees harvest honey from flower, keepers of cow draw milk without starving the calf or hurting the cow; those who cannot bear the burden of taxes, should not be taxed. Chapter 267 suggests the judicial staff to reflect before sentencing, only sentence punishment that is proportionate to the crime, avoid harsh and capital punishments, and never punish the innocent relatives of a criminal for the crime. Several chapters, such as 15 and 90, of the parva claim the proper function of a ruler is to rule according to dharma; he should lead a simple life and he should not use his power to enjoy the luxuries of life. Shanti parva defines dharma not in terms of rituals or any religious precepts, but in terms of that which increases Satya (truth), Ahimsa (non-violence), Asteya (non-stealing of property created by another), Shoucham (purity), and Dama (restraint). Chapter 109 of Shanti parva asserts rulers have a dharma (duty, responsibility) to help the upliftment of all living beings. The best law, claims Shanti parva, is one that enhances the welfare of all living beings, without injuring any specific group.

=== The fowler and the pigeons ===
Shanti parva recites many symbolic fables and tales, one of which is the fable of the fowler and the pigeons. This fable is recited in Chapters 143 through 147, by Bhishma to Yudhishthira, as a lesson on virtue, profit and desire: A wicked fowler made his living by capturing wild birds in the forest, by cruel means, and selling them for their meat or as pets. One day, while he was in the forest, a cold storm blew in. The storm knocked down a pigeon, who lay helpless on the ground, trembling in the cold. The fowler picked up the pigeon and put her in a cage in order to sell her. The storm continued. The fowler decided to take shelter and spend the cold night under a huge tree. As he sat under the tree, he loudly called on all deities and creatures that resided in the tree to allow him shelter, as he was their guest. On one of the branches of the tree, there lived a pigeon family, whose lady-of-the-nest had gone out for food but had not yet returned. The male pigeon lamented how he missed his wife, cooing, "One's home is not a home, it is a wife that makes a home. Without my wife, my house is desolate. If my wife does not come back today, I do not want to live, for there is no friend like a wife." The missing wife of the lamenting pigeon was the pigeon in the cage below.

The pigeon in the cage called out her pigeon husband, and asked him not to worry about her or his own desire, but to treat the fowler as a guest to the best of his abilities. "The fowler is cold and hungry," said the she-pigeon. "Be hospitable to him, do not grieve for me. One should be kind to everyone, even those who have done you wrong," said the she-pigeon. The pigeon husband, so moved by his wife's request, flew down and welcomed the fowler. The pigeon asked what he could provide to make the fowler comfortable. The fowler said a warm fire could drive his cold away. So, the pigeon collected some dry leaves and set them ablaze. The fire warmed up the fowler, who then told the male pigeon he was very hungry. The pigeon had no food to offer to his guest. So, the pigeon walked around the fire three times, then told the fowler to eat him, and the pigeon entered the fire to provide a meal for the fowler. The pigeon's compassion shook the fowler, who began reflecting on his life. The fowler resolved to be compassionate to all creatures. He silently released the female pigeon from the cage. She, who had just lost her pigeon husband, was so deeply in love that she too walked into the fire. The fowler cried, and was overwhelmed with sadness for all the injury and pain he had caused to wild birds over the years.

== Critical reception ==
Western Scholars have questioned the chronology and content of many chapters in Shanti Parva and its companion book the Anushasana Parva. These scholars ask whether these two books represent wisdom from ancient India, or were these chapters smuggled in to spread social and moral theories during India's medieval era or during second millennium AD.

== Quotations and teachings ==
Rajadharma anushasana parva, Chapter 25:

Sorrow comes after happiness, and happiness after sorrow;
One does not always suffer sorrow, nor always enjoy happiness.

Only those who are stolid fools, and those who are masters of their souls, enjoy happiness here;
They, however, who occupy an intermediate position suffer misery.

Happiness and misery, prosperity and adversity, gain and loss, death and life, in their turn, visit all creatures;
The wise man, endued with equanimous soul would neither be puffed up with joy, nor be depressed with sorrow.

— Vyasa, Shanti Parva, Mahabharata Book xii.25.23-31

Rajadharma anushasana parva, Chapter 56:

There is nothing which leads so much to the success of kings as Truth,
the king who is devoted to Truth enjoys happiness both here and hereafter.
Even to the Rishis, O king, Truth is the greatest wealth,
Likewise for the kings, there is nothing that so much creates confidence in them as Truth.

— Bhishma, Shanti Parva, Mahabharata Book xii.56.17-18

Apaddharma anushasana parva, Chapter 138:

Nobody is nobody's friend,
nobody is nobody's wellwisher,
persons become friends or enemies only from motives of interest.

— Bhishma, Shanti Parva, Mahabharata Book xii.138.108

Apaddharma anusasana parva, Chapter 142:

I do not instruct you regarding duty from what I have learned from the Vedas alone;
What I have told you is the result of wisdom and experience, it is the honey that the learned have gleaned.
Kings should collect wisdom from various sources,
One cannot go successfully in the world with the help of a one sided morality;
Duty must originate from understanding, the practices of the good should always be determined.
A king by the help of his understanding and guided by knowledge gathered from various sources,
should so arrange that moral laws may be observed.

— Bhishma to Yudhishthira, Shanti Parva, Mahabharata Book xii.142.3-7

Moksha dharma parva, Chapter 259:

All men who live on this earth, are filled with doubts regarding the nature of Righteousness.
What is this that is called Righteousness? Whence does Righteousness come?

— Yudhishthira, Shanti Parva, Mahabharata Book xii.259.1-2

Moksha dharma parva, Chapter 259:

Righteousness begets happiness as its fruit;
There is nothing superior to truth; Everything is supported by truth, and everything depends on truth.

One should not take other's properties, that is an eternal duty;
A thief fears everybody, he considers other people as sinful as himself;
A pure hearted person is always filled with cheerfulness, and has no fear from anywhere;
Such a person never sees his own misconduct in other persons.

A person should never do that to others, which he does not like to be done to him by others;
Whatever wishes one cherishes about his own self, one should certainly cherish regarding another.

The Creator ordained Virtue, gifting it with the power of holding the world together.

— Bhishma, Shanti Parva, Mahabharata Book xii.259.5-25

Moksha dharma parva, Chapter 299:

There is no fixed time for the acquisition of righteousness. Death waits for no man. When man is constantly running towards the jaws of Death, the accomplishment of righteous acts is proper at all times. Like a blind man who, with attention, is capable of moving about his own house, the man of wisdom, with mind set on Yoga, succeeds in finding the track he should follow. (...) One who walketh along the track recommended by the understanding, earns happiness both here and hereafter.

— Parāśara, Shanti Parva, Mahabharata Book xii.299

== See also ==
- Previous book of Mahabharata: Stri Parva
- Next book of Mahabharata: Anushasana Parva
