= Arunabha Sengupta =

Indian novelist and sports writer (born 1973)

Arunabha Sengupta (born Kolkata, India, 13 June 1973) is an Indian-born sports writer and novelist who resides in the Netherlands.

He has written five non-fiction volumes on cricket history with a socio-political perspective as well as four novels and one collection of short stories. He has also written two pastiche cricket novels. He has worked as a cricket historian and a cricket writer at CricketCountry.com and Scoreline.org. His writing also appears alongside luminaries like Khushwant Singh and Pritish Nandy in Lessons on Lessons, a collection of essays on the insights gained from the biographical work edited by P. Lal.

== Writing ==
Sengupta came to the wider attention of readers of cricket writing with the publication in 2015 of Sherlock Holmes and the Birth of The Ashes. This pastiche places the fictional detective Sherlock Holmes at the 1882 Test match at The Oval. This book was shortlisted for the Cricket Society and MCC Book of the Year Award in 2016. Stephen Chalke listed it as one of the ten best cricket books he had ever read.

Apartheid: A Point to Cover, published in 2020, is a history of South African cricket during the apartheid era 1948–1970 leading up to the Stop The Seventy Tour campaign. It has an introduction by Peter Hain. Sachin and Azhar in Cape Town, co-written with Abhishek Mukherjee, was published in 2021. The book discusses India and South Africa, the countries and their cricket, against the foil of the strong partnership between Tendulkar and Azharuddin in the Newlands Test of 1997. It has an introduction by Harsha Bhogle.

Elephant in the Stadium, published in 2022, covers India's historic Test series win in England in 1971. With the series as the main theme, the book is also a look at the complex relationship between India and Britain through the days of colonial rule to the modern day. It has an introduction by Mihir Bose. The book was shortlisted for the Derek Hodgson Cricket Writers' Club Book of the Year Award 2022., shortlisted for the British Sports Book Awards 2023 in the Heartaches' Cricket Book of the Year category and also longlisted for the MCC Cricket Society Book of the Year Award 2023. The book was listed as one of The Times' Best Sports Books of 2022. Alyson Rudd, chairperson of the William Hill Sports Book of the Year Award, adjudged it to be the best cricket book of 2022. She wrote: "It was a quiet year for cricket books, but arguably the best is Elephant in the Stadium, by Arunabha Sengupta, which is a social history and as much about the legacy of colonialism as it is about India’s first Test series win in England in 1971."

The Ashes: This Thing Can Be Done is a history of The Ashes in a graphic novel format. It is co-written with artist and sports-illustrator Maha and has an introduction by Stephen Chalke.

Cricket Across Dark Waters, published in 2025, gives an account of cricket played between India and the West Indies cricket. Along with the cricket there is an exploration of the fortune of the two geographies - India and the various Caribbean nations - in the post-colonial world as their cricketing fortunes evolved. It has an introduction by Shashi Tharoor. In CricketWeb this book was rated 4.5 stars and lauded for the originality with which it dwelled on the complex historical undercurrents along with the cricket. According to the Association of Cricket Statisticians and Historians it supplies a model for how a new historiography can be opened up. The book was nominated for the 2025 Ekamra Sports Literature Festival Book Awards

In October 2026, he published another work of pastiche, Elementary, My Dear Wodehouse: A Sherlock Holmes Mystery - a Sherlock Holmes cricket mystery written in the style of P.G. Wodehouse.

Sengupta's novels include Labyrinth – a novel about the Software Industry (2006) and Big Apple 2 Bites (2007). The latter is a novel combining the worlds of software, love and aikido and set against the backdrop of 9/11. The author himself is a first dan black belt in Kobayashi Aikido. The Best Seller (2010) is a novel set in Amsterdam, dealing with, among others, the travels and travails of a struggling writer in the murky publishing world. ForeWord Reviews rated the novel 5 stars.

== Bibliography ==
- Bowled Over: Stories Between the Covers, Calcutta, 2004. ISBN 978-8-1815-7266-0
- Labyrinth – a novel about the Software Industry. iUniverse. 2006). ISBN 0-595-39697-6
- Big Apple 2 Bites. Frog Books. 2007. ISBN 81-88811-98-X
- The Best Seller. Createspace. 2010. ISBN 978-1-4538-0398-1
- Sherlock Holmes and the Birth of The Ashes. Best Mysteries. 2015. ISBN 978-9-4922-0301-4
- Apartheid: A Point to Cover. CricketMASH. 2020. ISBN 978-9-4922-0303-8
- Sachin and Azhar in Cape Town. Pitch Publishing. 2021. (co-written with Abhishek Mukherjee) ISBN 978-1-7853-1819-1
- The Ashes: This Thing Can Be Done. CricketMASH. 2022. ISBN 978-9-4922-0310-6
- Elephant in the Stadium. Pitch Publishing. 2022 ISBN 978-1-8015-0094-4
- Cricket Across Dark Waters. CricketMASH. 2025. ISBN 978-9-4922-0320-5
- Elementary, My Dear Wodehouse Frames Publishing. 2026.ISBN 978-9-4922-0317-5
