= Lancelot Ribeiro =

British painter (1933–2010)

- Born: Lanceloté José Belarmino Ribeiro; 28 November 1933; Bombay, British India
- Died: 25 December 2010 (aged 77); London, UK
- Resting place: Ernest George Columbarium, Golders Green Crematorium, London NW11 7NL
- Education: St Xavier's High School for Boys, Bombay (1939–1942) St Mary's Senior Cambridge School, Mount Abu, Rajputana (1944–1950)
- Known for: Paintings, drawings, sculptures, ceramics, poetry, critical writings, Founder member of the Indian Painters Collective, UK (1963) and IAUK (1978/79)
- Notable work: The Warlord (1966), King Lear (1964), Stricken Monk (1968)
- Style: Expressionist painting, Acrylics
- Movement: Abstract Expressionism, Surrealism
- Spouse: Ana Rita Pinto Correia (m. 1960)
- Children: 2
- Relatives: F. N. Souza (half-brother)
- Awards: Awarded a grant from the Congrés pour la Liberté de la Culture [Congress for Cultural Freedom], Paris in 1962. Nominated for All India Gold Medal (c.1961).
- Patrons: Dr Homi Bhabha, TATA Group, Prof. Patrick Boylan (New Walk Museum & Art Galleries), Amb. Salman Haidar Former Foreign Secretary

Lanceloté José Belarmino Ribeiro (28 November 1933 – 25 December 2010) was an Expressionist painter, best known for his experiments with polyvinyl acetate and oil paints, the forerunner of modern acrylic paints. According to The Independent, he is considered to have been at "the vanguard of the influx of Indian artists to Britain."

== Early life ==
Lanceloté José Belarmino Ribeiro was born in Bombay, British India (now Mumbai, India) on 28 November 1933 to Goan Catholic parents, accountant João José Fernando Flores Ribeiro and his dressmaker wife Lilia Maria Cecilia de Souza (née Antunes). He was the half-brother of artist F. N. Souza through Lilia, who married João after her first husband, F. N. Souza's father, died. Ribeiro moved to London in 1950, living with his brother while studying accountancy. He abandoned his career as an accountant when he attended classes at St. Martin's School of Art between 1951 and 1953. He served in the Royal Air Force at Dumfries in Scotland, then returned to Bombay. After working with Life Insurance Corporation, he began working professionally as a painter in 1958.

=== Childhood and school years (1933–1949) ===
Ribeiro’s father João José Fernando Flores Ribeiro (1902–1988) was a chartered accountant and his mother Lília Maria Cecília Ribeiro (née Antunes) (1901–1987) a milliner and tailor. She had lost her first husband at twenty-three, and then what would have been Ribeiro’s half-sister, Zemira, aged two and a half to diphtheria. His older half-brother, the artist F. N. Souza (1924–2004), contracted the deadly smallpox virus at 3 months of age but survived. It was in January 1933 that Lily remarried and Lancelot Ribeiro (christened Lanceloté José Belarmino Ribeiro) was born on 28 November 1933 in Bombay (now Mumbai), followed by a sister, Marina Ribeiro (1935–2015), two years later.

The Bombay of Ribeiro’s childhood was lively and cosmopolitan, and still under the British Empire. It was a thriving centre for the arts, culture and sciences, which inevitably shaped his wide-ranging interests. The family home in Hira Building overlooked Bombay’s famous Crawford Market. The Ribeiros ancestral roots were from Azossim, a village in the district of Ilhas (now Tiswadi) in Old Goa. Although Goa was part of the Indian subcontinent, its customs and traditions had been shaped by the Portuguese 400-year colonial presence, which had brought the Roman Catholic faith there. The visual beauty of this landscape influenced Ribeiro’s early work.

== Life in India ==
His debut exhibition in Bombay’s Artist Aid Centre in 1961 was an instant sell-out and launched his career as a painter. It won him a commission from Tata Industries to paint a 12-foot mural for the chairman and chief executive of Tata Iron and Steel, J.R.D. Tata and interest from other corporate collectors. This included the trio of Jewish émigrés who had helped develop India’s nascent modern art scene – Rudi von Leyden, Walter Langhammer and Emanuel Schlesinger, who had escaped Europe’s Holocaust.

Ribeiro’s output over six decades of work was wide-ranging and experimental in medium, style, and form. His experimentation with polyvinyl acetate (PVA) positioned him as “a godfather to generations of artists using acrylics as an alternative to oils” (The Times, 2011).

With fellow painters, he co-founded the Indian Painters Collective, UK (IPC) in 1963, the first informal body of its kind outside of India. Over its 25-year history, the IPC advocated for better representation of artists from the subcontinent, eventually evolving into Indian Artists UK (IAUK) in 1978/79.

== Influence and critical reception ==
The Independent placed Ribeiro at "the vanguard of the influx of Indian artists to Britain." He rebelled against fashions, fiercely critical of those he saw as following the mainstream. In 1972, describing his own artistic practice for the Commonwealth Institute, he reflected on the impulses which drove his work, a sentiment that could equally be used to convey a lifelong philosophy: “I could go on endlessly to produce painting after painting – interesting perhaps – but somewhat meaningless and self-plagiarizing.”

== Career ==
Ribeiro's creative life spanned half a century, during which time he became known for a "huge body" of figurative and abstract work. From 1951 until 1953, he joined art classes at Saint Martin's School of Art, London. In 1958, he began painting professionally. 1960 saw him organize his first solo exhibition, Bombay Art Society Salon. It was soon sold out. Five other exhibitions followed this in Bombay (Mumbai), New Delhi and Calcutta (Kolkata). 1961 saw his first solo art exhibition at the Bombay Artist Aid Centre. It was included among the Ten Indian Painters exhibition., and was given an extensive tour of India, Europe, US and Canada. He also received a commission for a 12-foot mural for the Tata Iron and Steel Company.

He returned to London with his wife in 1962. There he received a grant from the Congress for Cultural Freedom in Paris. He held mixed shows at the Piccadilly, Rawinski, John Whibley and Crane Kalman galleries in London and also at the Yvon Lambert Gallery in Paris. He received an All India Gold Medal nomination. 1963 saw him co-found the Indian Painters’ Collective. In the 1960s and 1970s he held both solo and group shows. Ribeiro lectured on Indian art and culture at the Commonwealth Institute.

A retrospective covering his 1960s work was held in 1986 at Leicestershire Museum and Art Gallery. In 1987 his work was displayed at Camden Arts Centre. In 1998, his work was displayed at LTG Gallery, New Delhi. He displayed one painting at British Art Fair, 2010 after a long absence. Ribeiro died in 2010 in London.

In 2013 there was a retrospective exhibition at Asia House, London in May–June. An exhibition was scheduled for New Delhi in November. In November 2016, as part of the 2017 UK-India Year of Culture, the exhibition Ribeiro: A Celebration of Life, Love and Passion was held in association with the British Museum and other institutions.

== Legacy ==
Ribeiro died in London on 25 December 2010, aged 77. He left an artistic legacy of artwork as well as extensive critical and poetic writings. His creative life spanned half a century, and he left what has been described as a "huge body" of figurative and abstract work. Among his artistic productions were portrait heads, still lifes, landscapes, and pigment experiments dating back to the early 1960s which "lead to works of peculiar brilliance and transparency".

It has been suggested that Ribeiro had a hand in completing some of his brother Souza's art works. Ellen Von Weigand wrote that "Souza's success and resulting social life meant that he frequently left works unfinished. Ribeiro would complete them, using the painter's harsh, aggressive strokes to form his church spires, iconographic heads and anti-naturalistic still-lives. His brother would then return to add his hasty signature to the finished piece."

On 28 November 2024, Google celebrated his 91st birthday with a Google Doodle.

=== Role of acrylics ===
The Times of London acknowledges Ribeiro's role as an "acclaimed Indian artist who pioneered the use of acrylics in the 1960s, producing a brilliancy of color in his expressionistic works". The paper talks of Ribeiro's "increasing impatience" by the 1960s over the time it took for oils to dry, as also its "lack of brilliance in its color potential." He took to the new synthetic plastic bases that commercial paints were beginning to use, and soon got help from manufacturers like ICI, Courtaulds and Geigy. The companies supplied him samples of their latest paints in quantities that he was using three decades later, according to the paper. Initially, the firms thought the PVA compounds would not be needed in commercially viable quantities. But they quickly recognized the potential demand and "so Ribeiro became the godfather of generations of artists using acrylics as an alternative to oils."
