= Uluka =

Character in the Mahabharata

- Mahabharata character
- A Pahari painting by Nainsukh illustrating Uluka (seated fourth from the left) alongside other notable Kaurava allies.
- Gender: Male
- Position: Warrior, messenger
- Relatives: Shakuni (father); Unnamed successor of Shakuni (brother); Subala (grand-father); Achala, Vrishaka and other brothers of Shakuni (uncles); Gandhari (aunt); Kauravas (cousins)
- Origin: Gandhara

Uluka (Sanskrit: उलूक, IAST: Ulūka, lit. 'owl') is a character in the Mahabharata, one of the two principal Sanskrit epics of ancient India. He is described as the prince of the Gandhara Kingdom and the eldest son of its ruler, Shakuni, who is renowned within the epic as a cunning gambler. Uluka serves as the final emissary of his cousin, Duryodhana, on the eve of the Kurukshetra War, conveying the rejection of peace proposal to the Pandavas. Uluka participates in the Kurukshetra war from the Kaurava side and is killed by the youngest Pandava Sahadeva during the conflict, shortly before the death of his father.

== Literary background ==
The Mahabharata, one of the Sanskrit epics from the Indian subcontinent, other being the Ramayana. It mainly narrates the events and aftermath of the Kurukshetra War, a war of succession between two groups of princely cousins, the Kauravas and the Pandavas. The work is written in Classical Sanskrit and is a composite work of revisions, editing and interpolations over many centuries. The oldest parts in the surviving version of the text may date to near 400 BCE. The Mahabharata is divided into eighteen parvas or 'books'.

Uluka's presence is recorded in the first book, Adi Parva, but his most prominent role unfolds in the Udyoga Parva, the fifth book. As documented by scholar J.A.B. van Buitenen, Uluka is initially introduced with the epithet Kaitava—a term meaning "son of the gambler"—a reference to Shakuni. It is in subsequent books that this identification becomes explicit. Chapters 158-160 of the Udyoga Parva (Critical Edition) are dedicated to Uluka's embassy and the chapters are classified as a sub-book called Ulukadutagamana Parva.

== Etymology and epithets ==
The name Ulūka (Sanskrit: उलूक) primarily denotes "owl" and is found in several Vedic and classical texts, including the Ṛgveda (x.165.4), Atharvaveda (vi.29.1), Vājasaneyisaṃhitā, Taittirīyasaṃhitā, Mahābhārata, and Manusmṛti. The term is derived from the root √val, as explained in the Uṇādi-sūtra (iv.41). Ulūka is also the name of a country in the Mahabharata.

Being the son of Shakuni, Uluka is referred to by multiple epithets in the epic, including Śākuni, Kaitaka, Saubalyasuta and Kaitavya.

== Biography ==
=== Family and early life ===
Uluka was born in the royal family of Gandhāra as the eldest son of King Shakuni. Uluka's paternal aunt was Gandhari, the queen of Kuru Kingdom and the mother of the Kauravas siblings headed by Duryodhana. The name of Uluka's mother is not mentioned in the epic, and it is also attested that he has a brother, who eventually survives the Kurukshetra War and becomes the ruler of Gandhara after the war.

During his youth, Uluka attends the svayamvara ceremony of Draupadi, the heroine of the epic.

=== Role as Messenger ===
Years later, at a critical juncture before the war, Duryodhana summons Uluka and gives him a provocative message to deliver to Yudhishthira and Bhima—an inflammatory address calculated to insult and provoke the Pandavas. Uluka arrives at the Pandava camp and speaks before the assembled leaders. The message references past events, including Draupadi's public humiliation, the exile of the Pandavas, and their defeat in the game of dice, culminating in a challenge to reclaim their honor and kingdom through armed conflict.

It also contains pointed personal attacks and strategic taunts. Duryodhana, through Uluka, mocks Bhima's oath to drink Dushasana’s blood and derides Arjuna’s perceived inaction. He further questions the Pandavas’ ability to defeat warriors such as Bhishma and Drona, comparing such efforts to attempts to uproot Mount Meru or scale Gandhamadana. Uluka emphasizes the formidable composition of the Kaurava alliance, which includes diverse and powerful contingents from regions such as Kamboja, Shaka, Pulinda, and Dravida, asserting that their combined strength is insurmountable.

The speech triggers a strong reaction among the Pandavas. Bhima trembles with fury, while Arjuna reaffirms his vow. Krishna responds with calm but firm resolve, dismissing Uluka after delivering a stern counter-message to Duryodhana. He assures that the Pandavas’ vows will be fulfilled, and the Kauravas’ arrogance will face its reckoning. Uluka then returns to Duryodhana and relays the Pandavas' responses. Duryodhana, undeterred, orders the yoking of the war chariots, marking the final preparations for the impending conflict.

=== Kurukshetra War ===
Uluka, along with other Gandhara warriors, actively engages in combat during the Kurukshetra War on the side of the Kauravas. According to the Bhishma Parva, he encounters Dhrishtaketu, the King of Chedi, on the first day of battle. Later in the same book, it is said that he engages Sahadeva in combat. Uluka is also defeated by Arjuna, as described in the Drona Parva. Following the death of the Kaurava commander in chief, Drona, the Drona Parva records that Uluka flees the battlefield. In a subsequent phase of the war, the Karna Parva narrates that Uluka manages to defeat Yuyutsu in battle.

Uluka is slain on the last day of the Kurukshetra War, during the same engagement in which his father, Shakuni, meets his end. According to the Shalya Parva, as Shakuni advances against Sahadeva, the latter retaliates with a volley of arrows. Uluka enters the fray at this point, striking Bhima with ten arrows in an attempt to support his father. Shakuni then lands a blow on Sahadeva's head with a lance, momentarily incapacitating him. Seeking to rescue Shakuni, Uluka intensifies his offensive, directing seven arrows at Bhima and seventy at Sahadeva. Bhima responds by hitting Uluka with numerous arrows and wounding Shakuni with sixty-four shafts. Sahadeva, recovering from the earlier attack, subsequently decapitates Uluka with a broad-headed arrow. Shakuni's reaction to Uluka's death is marked by visible grief. Overcome with emotion, Shakuni charges at Sahadeva, armed with a gold-ornamented lance. Sahadeva counters with a broad-headed iron arrow, feathered with gold, which cleanly severs Shakuni's head.

== Assessment ==
According to J.A.B. van Buitenen, the four envoys dispatched during the diplomatic exchanges preceding the Kurukshetra War represent markedly different types of messengers with distinct qualifications. Yudhishthira sends a Brahmin of the highest Vedic purity, who is also the domestic priest of King Drupada. Kuru king Dhritarashtra’s envoy is Sanjaya, his personal bard and long-time confidant. Krishna undertakes a peace mission as a prince in his own right, favorably disposed toward both parties and motivated by conciliation. In contrast, Duryodhana selects Uluka, referred to by the patronymic Kaitavya, meaning "son of a gambler". According to van Buitenen, Uluka appears to be a man of low status, and the decision to send him as an emissary can be viewed as a cynical gesture. Van Buitenen observes that it is particularly pointed for Duryodhana to issue his final challenge to the Pandavas through the son of the very gambler who had once and for all defeated Yudhishthira and ruined him.
