= Svargarohana Parva =

Eighteenth book of the Mahabharata

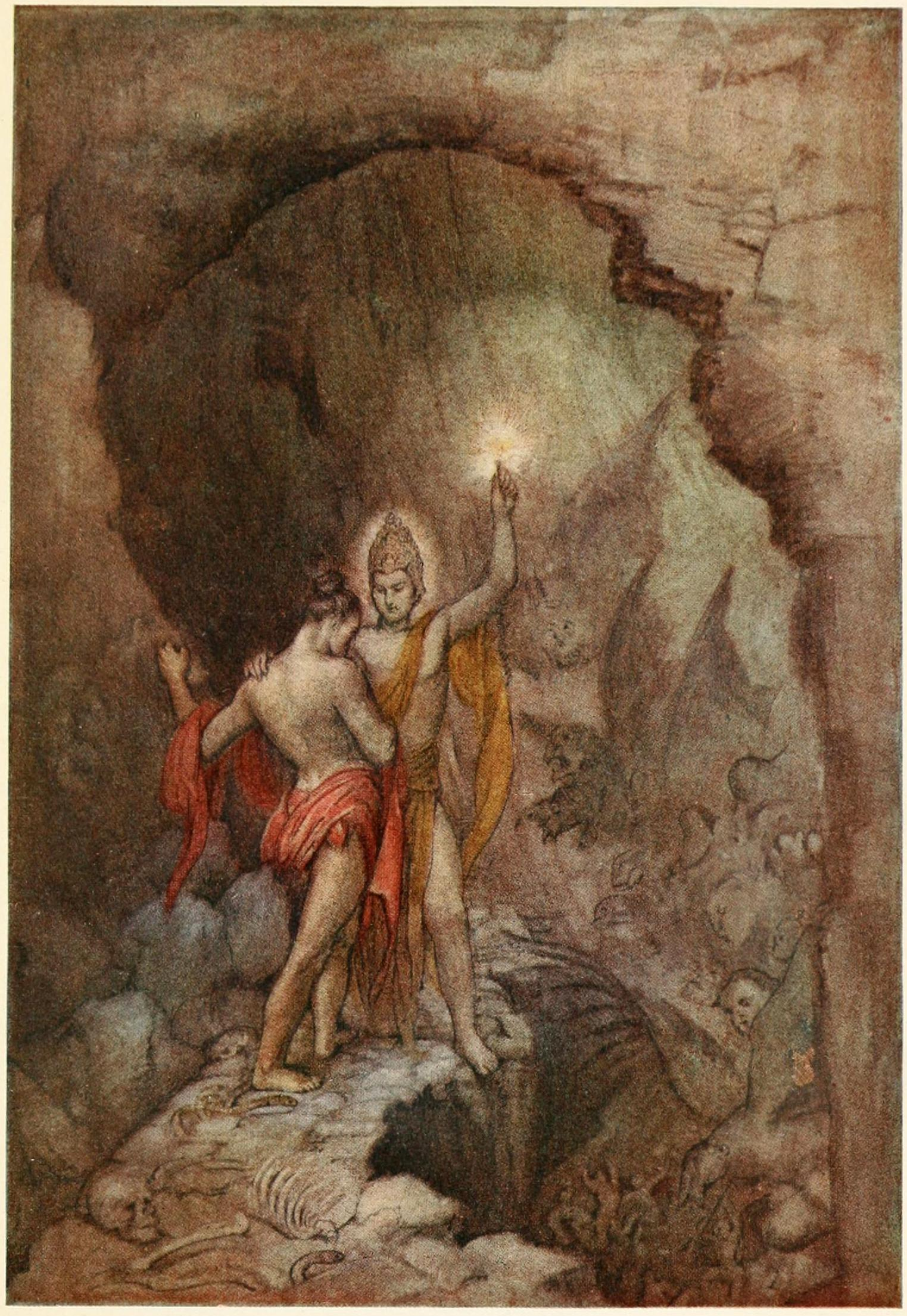
Indra showing hell to Yudhishthira, a scene from the Svargarohana Parva illustrated by Evelyn Paul

The Svargarohana Parva (Sanskrit: स्वर्गारोहण पर्व "Book of the Ascent to Heaven") is the final of eighteen parvas (books) of the Indian epic Mahabharata. It traditionally has 6 chapters, while the critical edition has 5 chapters. It is one of the shortest books in the Mahabharata.

The Svargarohana Parva describes the arrival of Yudhishthira to heaven, his visit to hell, and what he finds in both places. Yudhishthira is upset when he finds evil people in heaven and the good in hell. He demands that he be sent to hell where those who love him are present. The gods then reveal that their loved ones are indeed in heaven. The Parva ends with Yudhishthira happy.

== Structure and chapters ==
The Svargarohana Parva traditionally has 6 adhyayas (chapters) but no secondary upa-parvas (parts, little books). It is the second-shortest book of the epic.

After entering heaven, Yudhishthira is frustrated to find people in heaven who had sinned on earth. He then asks for a visit to hell, where he finds people whom he had thought were good and virtuous on earth. He questions whether the gods were fair at all, and whether virtue during earthly life meant anything. In a fit of anger, he demands that he be sent to hell so he may be with those people who were good, just, virtuous, whom he loved, and who loved him. The gods then caused the illusory hell they had created as a test to vanish. Yudhishthira's father, the deity Dharma appears, and congratulates Yudhishthira for standing up for dharma sending him to Vaikuntha, where he finds eternal bliss.

Yudhishthira is happy. He meets Krishna, in his form as Vishnu. He then sees Draupadi in heaven with his other brothers.

== English translations ==
Svargarohana Parva was composed in Sanskrit. Several translations in English are available. Two translations from 19th century, now in public domain, are those by Kisari Mohan Ganguli and Manmatha Nath Dutt. The translations vary with each translator's interpretations.

Debroy, in 2011, notes that updated critical edition of Svargarohana Parva, after removing verses generally accepted so far as spurious and inserted into the original, has 5 adhyayas (chapters) and 194 shlokas (verses).

The entire parva has been "transcreated" and translated in verse by the poet Dr. Purushottama Lal published by Writers Workshop.

== Significance ==
Svargarohana Parva is significant for claiming Vyasa as the creator of a poem with 6,000,000 verses with all the eternal knowledge there is. Of these, he gave the gods 3,000,000 verses, 1,500,000 verses to Pitrs (ancestors), 400,000 verses to Yakshas (nature-spirits) and 100,000 verses as Mahabharata to human beings. It does not disclose where the unaccounted for 1,000,000 verses are. It ends with the claim that the Epic has all the shades of Truth in it.

Chapter 4 of Svargarohana Parva is also significant for claiming Krishna in the form of Brahman. In Anushasana Parva, Krishna was declared to be a form of Vishnu and of Shiva. This synonymous listing of various forms of Krishna as one, in Mahabharata, has led to the theory that all gods mentioned in Vedic literature are different forms of one God.

== Quotes & Teachings ==
Svargarohana Parva, Chapter 5:

There are thousands of occasions for joy and hundreds of occasions for fear;
These affect only him that is ignorant but never him that is wise;
With uplifted arms I am crying aloud but nobody hears me.

From Righteousness comes Wealth, also Pleasure;
Why should not Righteousness, therefore, be courted?
For the sake neither of pleasure, nor of fear, nor of cupidity should any one cast off Righteousness.

Indeed, for the sake of even life one should not cast off Righteousness;
Righteousness is eternal. Pleasure and Pain are not eternal;
Jiva is eternal. A body is not so.

— Svargarohana Parva, Mahabharata Book xviii.5

== See also ==
- Previous book of Mahabharata: Mahaprasthanika Parva
- Epilogue, Supplement to Mahabharata: Harivamsa
