= Ashramavasika Parva =

Fifteenth book of the Mahabharata

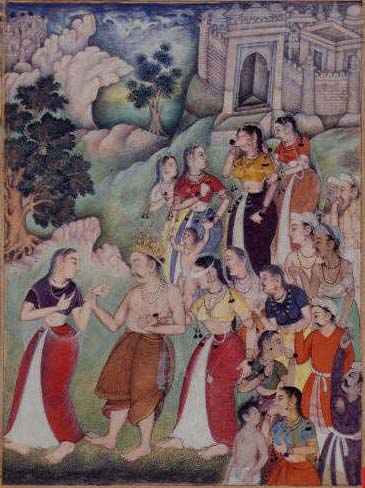
An illustration from the Razmnama depicting a scene of Ashramavasika Parva. Kunti leading Dhritarashtra and Gandhari as they head to Sannyasa

The Ashramvasika Parva (Sanskrit: आश्रमवासिक पर्व) ("Book of the Hermitage") is the fifteenth of the eighteen parvas (books) of the Indian epic Mahabharata. It traditionally has 3 parts and 39 chapters. The critical edition has 3 parts and 47 chapters.

The Ashramvasika Parva describes the fifteen years of prosperity under Yudhishthira following the great war. The five Pandavas live in amity with the survivors of their uncle's family, with Yudhishthira scrupulously consulting Dhritarashtra on matters of governance. Draupadi becomes friends with Gandhari, Vyasa and other sages visit the kingdom with their fables and wisdom. The parva recites the next two years when Dhritarashtra and Gandhari take sannyasa and live a hermit's life in a forest.

== Structure and chapters ==
The Ashramvasika Parva traditionally has 3 upa-parvas (parts, little books) and 39 adhyayas (chapters). The following are the sub-parvas:

1. Ashramavasa Parva (chapters: 1–28) – describes the fifteen-year reign by Yudhishthira after the great war, followed by the departure of Kunti, Dhritarashtra and Gandhari to Vyasa's hermitage for sannyasa. It also mentions Vidura and his death.
2. Putradarsana Parva (chapters: 29–36) – recites the visit of Pandavas to meet Kunti, Dhritarashtra and Gandhari at the hermitage. In the forest on the request of Gandhari, Kunti & other women, sage Vyasa with his powers, resurrect the dead warriors of Kurukshetra war for one night.
3. Naradagamana Parva (chapters: 37–39) – describes the death of Kunti, Dhritarashtra and Gandhari. Narada visits to console those in grief. Yudhishthira performs cremation rites for all of them.

The parva describes the 15-year rule by Pandavas with Yudhishthira as the king. Yudhishthira commanded his brothers to cause no grief to Dhritarashtra and Gandhari, who had lost all their hundred sons. Bhima alone however could not forgive the evil that his cousins had done, and his servitors disregarded Dhritarashtra's wishes. Once, the angry Vrikodara harshly reminded the old man how he had dispatched all his mighty sons to the other worlds. Hearing these words, Dhritarashtra gave way to cheerlessness and sorrow. After fifteen years Dhritarashtra and his wife sought the king's permission to take sannyasa (renunciation of domestic life for moksha). Yudhishthira initially disagreed but was persuaded otherwise by Vyasa.

Before leaving for the forest Dhritarashtra dispatched Vidura to the king, asking for the means to perform a śrāddha for the deceased Kurus. While Yudhishthira and Arjuna accepted the request, Bhima was enraged. Following the performance of the rites, Dhritarashtra, Gandhari, and Kunti left for the forest. Sanjaya and Vidura joined them in Vyasa's hermitage.

One year later the Pandavas went to meet with them. On seeking Vidura, Yudhishthira found him performing rigorous tapasya deep in the forest; without his uttering a word, energy left Vidura's body and entered that of Yudhishthira, after which Vidura fell dead. When he tried to cremate the corpse an invisible voice prevented the king from doing so. Vyasa then told him how Vidura was an incarnation of Dharma, the god of righteousness, born in the mortal world through the curse of Mandavya.

Vyasa understanding the sorrow of Dhritarashtra, Gandhari, and Kunti offered them a glimpse of their sons and relatives who died at Kurukshetra. The spirits of the slain then rose from the waters of the Bhagirathi, with Vyasa offering the blind Dhritarashtra celestial vision for beholding those heroes. The five Pandavas met Karna, Abhimanyu, and the sons of Draupadi. After some time that large ghostly host disappeared and went to their respective regions.

On hearing the story the sceptical Janamejaya asked Vyasa to prove the veracity of the tale, upon which Vyasa summoned Parikshit. The Pandavas, at Dhritarashtra's own request, then returned to Hastinapura.

Two years later, Narada informed Yudhishthira that Dhritarashtra, Gandhari, and Kunti had willingly perished in a forest-fire, after ordering Sanjaya to escape. Narada consoled the grieving Pandavas by telling that their aged relatives had found peace in the abodes of the gods. Yudhishthira then performed their śhraddha.

=== Jaimini's Shasramukharavanacaritam ===
Shasramukharavanacaritam claims to be part of the Asramavasika parva of the Jaiminiya Mahabharata. It begins with Janmejaya's queries following the return of Sita and her sons to Rama. Here Sita proceeds to kill the thousand-headed Ravana who had defeated all gods and Rama.

== English translations ==
Ashramvasik Parva was composed in Sanskrit. Several translations of the book in English are available. Two translations from the 19th century, now in the public domain, are those by Kisari Mohan Ganguli and Manmatha Nath Dutt. The translations vary with each translator's interpretations.

Debroy, in 2011, notes that updated critical edition of Ashramvasik Parva, after removing about 30% of verses generally accepted so far as spurious and inserted into the original, has 3 parts, 47 adhyayas (chapters) and 1,061 shlokas (verses).

The entire parva has been "transcreated" and translated in verse by the poet Dr. Purushottama Lal published by Writers Workshop.

== Quotes and teachings ==
Ashramvasika parva, Chapter 5:

Let thy judicial officers, O Yudhishthira, inflict punishments on offenders, according to the law, after careful determination of the gravity of the offenses.

— Dhritarashtra, Ashramvasika Parva, Mahabharata Book xv.5

Putradarsana parva, Chapter 34:

He who knows himself attains the highest understanding and becomes freed from error,
All creatures appear from an invisible state, and once more disappear into invisibleness.

He enjoys, or endures, the fruits of all his act, where he does them,
If the act be a mental one, its consequences are enjoyed, or endured, mentally;
If it is done with the body, its consequences are to be enjoyed, or endured, in the body.

— Vaisampayana, Ashramvasika Parva, Mahabharata Book xv.34

== See also ==
- Previous book of Mahabharata: Ashvamedhika Parva
- Next book of Mahabharata: Mausala Parva
