= Gandhara (Mahabharata) =

Kingdom mentioned in Indian epic literature

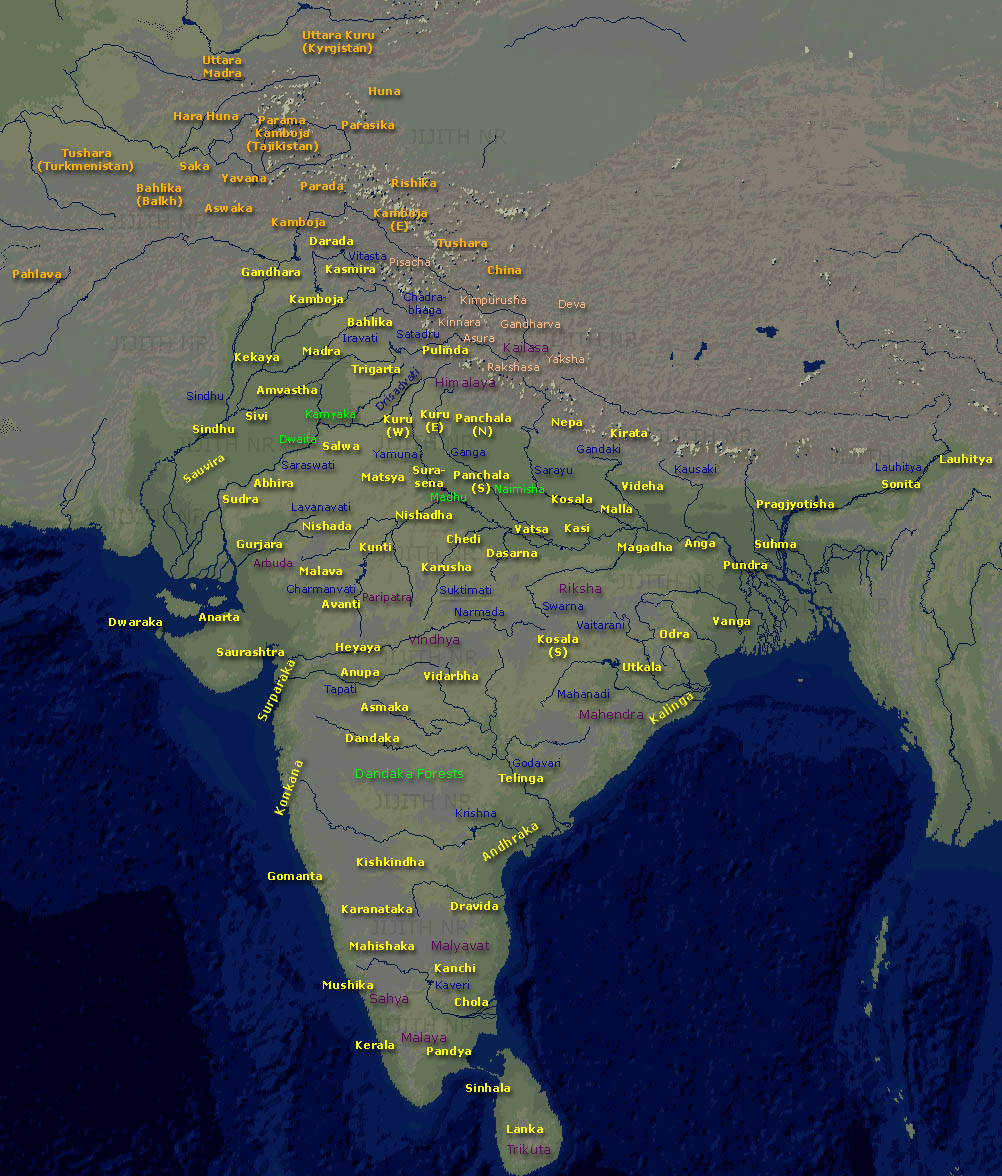
Gandhara among the kingdoms of Epic Indian history

Gandhāra (Sanskrit: गन्धार) was an ancient Indian kingdom mentioned in the Indian epics Mahabharata and Ramayana. Gandhara prince Shakuni was the root of all the conspiracies of Duryodhana against the Pandavas, which finally resulted in the Kurukshetra War. Shakuni's sister was the wife of the Kuru king Dhritarashtra and was known as Gandhari. Pushkalavati, Takshasila, and Purushapura were cities in this Gandhara kingdom. Takshasila was founded by Rama's brother Bharata. Bharata's descendants ruled the kingdom afterwards. During the epic's period, the kingdom was ruled by Shakuni's father Subala, Shakuni and Shakuni's son. Arjuna defeated Shakuni's son during his post-war military campaign for Yudhishthira's Aswamedha Yajna.

Janamejaya, a Kuru king in Arjuna's line, conquered Takshasila, probably then ruled by the Naga Takshaka. He conducted a massacre called Sarpa Satra meaning the slaughter of the snakes, in which the Naga race was nearly exterminated. This massacre was stopped by a Brahmin named Astika, whose mother was a Naga. Nagas were considered as a super human tribe, in Puranas. Naga literally means a Serpent or a serpent-god. The Nagas could be a group of people who inhabited India during epic periods who worshiped snakes.

The Yadava chief Bala Rama saw many Gandharva settlements on the banks of Saraswati River, not far from Gandhara, during his pilgrimage over Saraswati river basin. The Gandharva Kali and Dwapara, probably were princes from Gandhara. The last two Yugas (prehistoric periods) were named after them. Kuru King Dhritarashtra's wife was from Gandhara (a Gandharvi) and she was well known by the name Gandhari. There was a Gandhrava also by the name Chitrangada. (See Gandharva kingdom).

== References in Mahabharata ==
South Asia c. 500 BCE, with location of the Gandhara kingdom.

=== Gandhara, a kingdom of Bharata Varsha ===
Gandhara is mentioned as a hilly country at (5,30). "In the Krita age, they were nowhere on earth. It is from the Treta age that they have had their origin and began to multiply. When the terrible period came, joining Treta and the Dwapara, the Kshatriyas, approaching one another, engaged themselves in battle." Another group comprising Andrakas, Guhas, Pulindas, Savaras, Chuchukas, Madrakas were also mentioned along with the first group.

=== Gandhara King Subala ===
Subala (1,110) was a king of Gandhara in the Mahabharata. His sons were Shakuni, Subala, Achala, Vrishaka and Vrihadvala (1,188). All of them were Gandhara chiefs. Shakuni lived in the court of Kurus, as a councillor of king Dhritarashtra. His sister Gandhari was the mother of Duryodhana. Subala was present in the self-choice event of Draupadi and in the Rajasuya sacrifice of Pandava king Yudhishthira. Shakuni was a skilled dice-player. (2,57). Gaya, Gavaksha, Vrishava, Charmavat, Arjava, and Suka were mentioned as brothers of Shakuni, all of them being the warriors in the Kurukshetra War (6,91)

=== Other Gandhara kings ===
- Gandhara King Nagnajit and his sons were conquered by Vasudeva Krishna to liberate king Sudarsana from their confinement (5,48) (16,6)
- Vasudeva Krishna, vanquishing all the kings at a self-choice, bore away the daughter of the king of the Gandharas (7,11). This Gandhar princess went to forest mode of life after Krishna's departure from material world. (16,7)
- The mighty ruler of the Gandhara land, born in the lunar dynasty of kings was slain by Mandhata of Ikshwaku race. (3,26)

=== Karna's conquests ===
Karna is mentioned to have subjugated Gandharas along with others like the Madrakas, the Matsyas, the Trigartas, the Tanganas, the Khasas, the Pancalas, the Videhas, the Kulindas, the Kasi-kosalas, the Suhmas, the Angas, the Nishadhas, the Pundras, the Kichakas, the Vatsas, the Kalingas, the Taralas, the Asmakas, and the Rishikas (8,8). Karna who vanquished all the Kambojas and the Amvashthas with the Kaikeyas, that puissant one, who, having for the accomplishment of his purpose vanquished the Gandharas and the Videhas in battle (8,9)

=== Karna's opinion on Gandharas ===
- Karna mentions that among the Madra and the Gandharas, Kshatriyas were seen as priests rather than the Brahmanas (8,40)

In the region called Aratta, resides the people called the Vahikas. The lowest of Brahmanas also are residing there from very remote times. They are without the Veda and without knowledge, without sacrifice and without the power to assist at other's sacrifices. They are all fallen and many amongst them have been begotten by Shudras.. The gods never accept any gifts from them. The Prasthalas, the Madras, the Gandharas, the Arattas, those called Khasas, the Vasatis, the Sindhus and the Sauviras are almost as blamable in their practices (8,44)

This indicate that the Gandharas followed the Bahlika Culture. See the article Bahlika Culture for more details.

=== Gandharas in Kurukshetra War ===
Gandharas were naturally allied to Kauravas, due to Gandhari Prince Shakuni, a close companion of Duryodhana, being on the Kaurava Side. Gandhara army united with the Kaurava army right from the camping phase along with the chiefs of the Sakas, the Kiratas, and Yavanas, the Sivis and the Vasatis (5,198)

The following are other references that give valuable information on their role in Kurukshetra War:-

==== Gandhara heroes ====
- The Kekaya brothers, at the head of their troops, encountered in battle the five Gandhara princes with their troops. (6,45)
- Gaya, Gavaksha, Vrishava, Charmavat, Arjava, and Suka those brothers of Shakuni rushed against the foe (6,91)warriors in Kurukshetra War (6,91)
- Gandhara chief Vrishak and Achala battled with Arjuna (7,28)
- Abhimanyu slew Suvala's son Kalikeya (7,47)
- Shakuni and his son Uluka was followed by many fearless Gandhara horsemen armed with bright lances, and many mountaineers difficult to defeat (8,46)
- Shakuni slew the Kulinda king, the king of the mountaineers, in the Pandava army. (8,85)
- Madra army disobeyed Shakuni on 18th day and fought separately. (9,18). Dispute was resolved by Duryodhana (9,23)
- Sahadeva slew Shakuni and his son Uluka (9,28)

==== Gandhara army ====
- The mountaineers of Gandhara followed Shakuni (6,20)
- The Gandharas, the Sindhu-Sauviras, the Sivis and the Vasatis with all their combatants followed Bhishma (6,51)
- The Madras, the Sauviras, the Gandharas and the Trigartas were mentioned as battling united (6,71)
- The Madrakas, the Gandharas, the Sakunas were mentioned as battling united (7,20)
- The Kambojas, and Vanayus were mentioned united with the king of the Gandharas (8,7)

=== Arjuna's conquests ===
Arjuna conducted a military campaign after the Kurukshetra War. He then reached the Gandhara country. Arjuna reached the country of the five waters which swelled with population and prosperity. From there he proceeded to the country of Gandharas. Then occurred a fierce battle between Arjuna and the ruler of Gandharas, viz., the son of Shakuni (14,83)

== Musical note ==
Gandhara was also the name of a musical note, a technical term in the art of music. Mahabharata has several mentions of the Gandhara musical note. (4,17), (13,17)

- The seven musical notes are Shadaja, Rishabha, together with Gandhara, Madhyama, and likewise Panchama; after this should be known Dhaivata, and then Nishada. (12,183), (14,50) AD

== Rulers ==
•Gaur kshtriya Dynasty
Known Gandhara rulers are-

- Nagnajit
- Shakuni
- Subala
- Achala
- Kalikeya
- Suvala
- Vrishaka
- Vrihadvala
- Gaya
- Gavaksha
- Vrishava
- Charmavat
- Arjava
- Suka
- Kulinda
- Pushkarasarin (or Pukkusati) (c. 535–518 BCE), last ruler of Gandhara kingdom probably at time of Achaemenid conquest of the Indus Valley
- Kandik, (late ruler)

== See also ==
- Kingdoms in the Mahabharata
- Kingdoms in the Ramayana
