= Anushasana Parva =

Thirteenth book of the Mahabharata

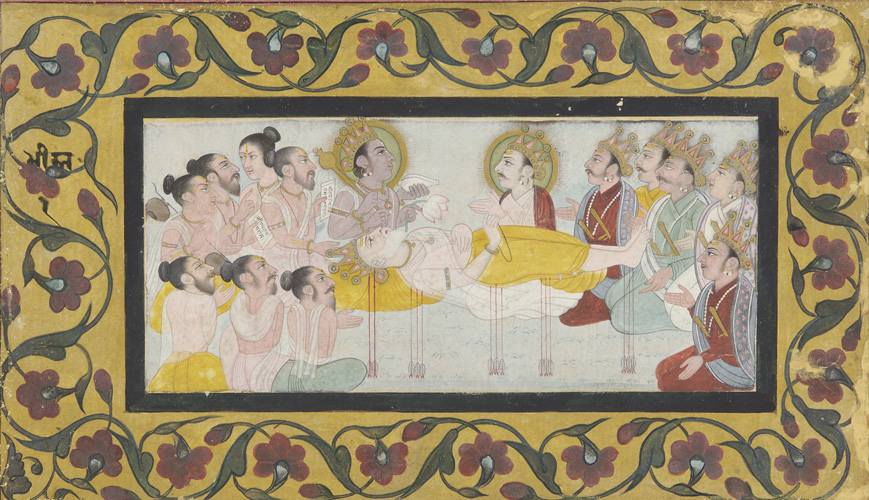
A dying Bhishma counsels the Pandavas in the presence of Krishna and sages; a 17th-century miniature painting

The Anushasana Parva (Sanskrit: अनुशासन पर्व, IAST: Anuśāsanaparva) ("Book of Instructions") is the thirteenth of the eighteen parvas (books) of the Indian epic Mahabharata. It traditionally has 2 parts and 168 chapters. The critical edition has 2 parts and 154 chapters. Sometimes this parva is referred to as the "Book of Precepts".

Anushasana Parva continues the theme of Shanti Parva, a discussion of duties of a ruler, the rule of law, instructions on dharma for those close to the leader. The dialogue is between Yudhishthira, Bhishma and other sages. The book debates the duties, behaviours and habits of individuals, with chapters dedicated to men and to women. Various types of marriages are mentioned and their merits compared. The parva also recites many symbolic tales and legends such as the legend of Nachiketa, as well as the death and last rites of Bhishma, the eldest member of the Kuru family.

This is a controversial book in the Mahabharata. In the 2nd-century CE Spitzer Manuscript found in Kizil Caves, China, which includes a table of contents of the Mahabharata, there is no mention of the Virata Parva and Anushasana Parva. Similarly, the old Mahabharata manuscripts in Sarada script discovered in Kashmir do not include this parva. This has led scholars such as Indologist Dieter Schlingloff to the proposal that the Anushasana Parva was a later interpolation into the epic. Others scholars disagree and suggest that the other parva titles as mentioned in the Spitzer Manuscript table of contents may have included most of the chapters now in Anushasana Parva. These and other evidence strongly support the thesis that the epic was expanded and that it evolved in the early centuries of the common era, but such minimalist evidence in old manuscripts must be taken with caution rather than summary dismissal of an entire Parva.

== Structure and context ==
The Anushasana Parva traditionally has 2 upa-parvas (parts, little books) and 168 adhyayas (chapters). The following are the sub-parvas:

1. Dana-dharma Parva (chapters: 1–152)
2. Bhishma-svargarohana Parva (chapters: 153–168)

The Parva starts with a visit to Bhishma, who is dying. He is surrounded by sages and rishis including Vashishta, Maitreya, Sanatkumara, Valmiki, Kapila, Vyasadeva, and Narada. As with Shanti Parva, Yudhishthira asks for counsel and Bhishma replies. It includes duties of the king, officials of a kingdom, men and women. The book dedicates several chapters to cows, their importance to household's food security, agriculture and wealth.

Chapter 134 of Anushasana Parva recites Vishnu sahasranama - a list of 1,000 names (sahasranama) of Vishnu. Included in the list of 1000 names for Vishnu are Shiva, Sharva, Sthanu, Ishana and Rudra. This synonymous listing of Shiva and Vishnu as one, in Mahabharata, has led to the belief that all gods mentioned in Vedic literature are one. In the end chapter, after giving beneficial speech unto all the kurus, Bhishma cast off his life breaths. Then Pandavas and Vidura made a funeral pyre and set fire, while others stood as spectators. Then all of them arrived at Bhagirathi, and offered oblations of water. The goddess rose up from the stream and indulge in lamentations for her son. The puissant Krishna consoles her and departs with others.

== Contents ==
Anushasana parva includes numerous symbolic tales and fables, as well as treatises that debate appropriate human behavior. Among these are discussions on human free will versus destiny, as well as duties and rights of women.

=== Anushasana parva on free will and destiny ===
Chapter 6 of Anushasana parva presents one of many debates on free will (exertion) and destiny in the Mahabharata. The debate starts as a question from Yudhisthira to dying Bhisma. The dying scholar answers by reciting the conversation between Vasishtha and Brahmana on whether karma in this life (exertion through free will) or karma from past (destiny) is the more powerful in shaping one's life. The Brahmana replies with an example of seeds. Without seeds, fruits do not grow. Good seeds when sown yield good fruits. Bad seeds when sown yield weeds and bad fruits. If no seeds are sown, there are no fruits. Without exertion in this life, destiny is meaningless. One's exertion now is like a tilled soil; the seeds are like destiny. The union of tilled soil and seeds, that is one's present effort and destiny inside the seed, produces the harvest. As one sows, so shall he reaps; happiness comes from good deeds, pain from evil deeds. Nothing can be gained by destiny alone. Personal exertion is necessary to fulfill whatever one desires, wealth one wishes, and knowledge one seeks. He who exerts with initiative is his own best friend, he who relies solely on destiny is his own worst en

=== Theory of compassion and non-violence ===
A theory of compassion is presented from Chapter 113 through 118 of Anusasana parva. Vrihaspati counsels Yudhisthira that universal compassion is key to successful and happy life. One must regard all creatures like one's own self, and behave towards them as towards one's own self. One should never do something to another person or any living creature, which one regards as injurious to one's own self, suggests Anushasana parva. When one injures another, the injured turns round and injures the injurer. Similarly, when one cherishes another, that other cherishes the cherisher. Whether it is a matter of refusals or gifts, creating happiness or misery, or doing or saying something that is agreeable or disagreeable, before doing or saying so, one should judge their effects by a reference to one's own self. This consideration of other's interest as one's own is compassion, and it is an essential rule of Dharma, claims Vrihaspati.

Bhisma, in Chapter 114 of Anushasana parva, explains that this theory of compassion applies not merely to one's actions, but to one's words as well as one's thoughts. One consequence of compassion, claims Bhisma, is Ahimsa - the abstention from injury or harm to anyone, or the principle of non-violence. This is expressed in Chapter 117 in the widely quoted verse on Ahimsa:

अहिंसा परमो धर्मस्तथाहिंसा परमो दमः
अहिंसा परमं दानम् अहिंसा परमस्तपः
अहिंसा परमो यज्ञस्तथाहिंसा परमं बलम्
अहिंसा परमं मित्रम् अहिंसा परमं सुखम्
अहिंसा परमं सत्यम् अहिंसा परमं श्रुतम्

Translation:

Ahimsa is the highest virtue, Ahimsa is the highest self-control;
Ahimsa is the greatest gift, Ahimsa is the best suffering;
Ahimsa is the highest sacrifice, Ahimsa is the finest strength;
Ahimsa is the greatest friend, Ahimsa is the greatest happiness;
Ahimsa is the highest truth, Ahimsa is the greatest teaching.

=== Duties and rights of women ===
Various chapters of Anushasana parva recite the duties and rights of women. The goddess of prosperity Lakshmi asserts, in the verses of Chapter 11, that she lives in those women who are truthful, sincere, modest, organized, devoted to their husband and children, health conscious, patient and kind to guests. The goddess asserts she does not reside in woman who is sinful, unclean, always disagreeing with her husband, has no patience or fortitude, is lazy, quarrelsome with her neighbors and relatives.

The duties of women are again recited in Chapter 146, as a conversation between god Shiva and his wife goddess Uma, where Shiva asks what are the duties of women. Uma (Parvati) suggests that the duties of women include being of a good disposition, endued with sweet speech, sweet conduct, and sweet features. For a woman, claims Uma, her husband is her god, her husband is her friend, and her husband is her high refuge. A woman's duties include physical and emotional nourishment, reverence and fulfillment of her husband and her children. Their happiness is her happiness, she observes the same vows as those that are observed by her husband, her duty is to be cheerful even when her husband or her children are angry, be there for them in adversity or sickness, is regarded as truly righteous in her conduct.

Ashtavakra visits the abode of Mahadeva in Chapter 19 through 21 of Anushasana parva, where he meets Apsaras. Ashtavakra and a lady then debate if women are independent, or are they always dependent on men. Ashtavakra argues that a woman is never independent, her father protects her when she is a child, husband when she is youthful, and her sons when she is old.

Chapter 44 of Anushasana parva declares a woman has a right to choose her husband and enter into Gandharva marriage, although this is only one of three recommended and righteous forms of marriages it lists for a woman. In other chapters, Anushasana parva suggests a girl's father should prevent his daughter or son from entering into Gandharva marriage, and encourages a marriage based on character, accomplishments and compatibility. In verses 22 and 23 of Chapter 44, the parva discourages a woman from living with a man she does not like, and notes prevalent differences in opinion on this subject.

Anushasana parva discusses inheritance rights of a woman over many chapters. This discussion is inconsistent, with some chapters differentiating inheritance rights of women based on caste if husband and wife are of same caste or if husband and wife are of different castes. Other chapters are silent about caste, but differentiate inheritance rights of women based on type of marriage. Verse 26 of Chapter 47 declares a daughter and son to be equal, with "The daughter, O king, has been ordained in the scriptures to be equal to the son." (Mahabharata xiii.47.26).

Property a woman inherits is her own, declares Anushasana Parva. A woman has the right to enjoy but not sell her husband's property if she becomes a widow.

=== Shaivism ===
Many chapters of Anushasana parva are dedicated to praising Mahadeva and Uma. These chapters explain their power, recommend their worship and are important to the bhakti sect named Shaivism.

=== Vaishnavism ===
Along with chapters on Shiva and Parvati, numerous chapters of Anushasana parva are dedicated to praising Vishnu and Lakshmi. These chapters are important to the bhakti sect named Vaishnavism. In this school of Hinduism, Chapter 149 of Anusasana parva is a source of mantra and chants. This is also called Viṣṇusahasranāma - a list of 1000 names of Vishnu.

== English translations ==
Anushasana Parva was composed in Sanskrit. Several translations of the book in English are available. Two translations from 19th century, now in public domain, are those by Kisari Mohan Ganguli and Manmatha Nath Dutt. The translations vary with each translator's interpretations.

Debroy, in 2011, notes that updated critical edition of Anushasana Parva, after removing verses and chapters generally accepted so far as spurious and inserted into the original, has 2 parts, 154 adhyayas (chapters) and 6,493 shlokas (verses).

The complete parva was translated in verse by Dr. Pradeep Bhattachaarya, including shlokas from all recensions in October 2023 by Writers Workshop.

== Critical reception ==
Scholars have questioned the chronology and content of many chapters in Anushasana Parva, whether they represent wisdom from ancient India, or were these chapters smuggled in to spread social and moral theories during India's medieval or during second millennium CE. Iyer, in 1923, compared different versions of Anushasana Parva manuscripts found in east, west and south India, in Sanskrit and in different Indian languages. The comparison showed that while some chapters and verses on Dharma and ethical theories are found in all manuscripts, there are major inconsistencies between many parts of the manuscripts. Not only is the order of chapters different, large numbers of verses were missing, entirely different or somewhat inconsistent between the manuscripts. The most inconsistent sections were those relating to women's rights and duties, discussion of social customs, castes, and those highlighting praise of specific gods. Iyer claims these chapters were smuggled into the Mahabharata, or the answers to question of Yudhishthira and other characters were entirely rewritten to suit local agenda or views. Alf Hiltebeitel similarly has questioned the authenticity of numerous verses of Anushasana and Shanti Parvas.

== See also ==
- Previous book of Mahabharata: Shanti Parva
- Next book of Mahabharata: Ashvamedhika Parva
