= Shiv K. Kumar =

Indian poet (1921–2017)

Shiv K. Kumar (16 August 1921, Lahore, British India – 1 March 2017, Hyderabad, India) was an Indian English-language poet, playwright, novelist, and short story writer. His grandfather late Tulsi Das Kumar was a school teacher and his father Bishan Das Kumar, was a retired headmaster. The letter 'K' stands for Krishna, i.e. Shiv Krishna Kumar.

== Early life and education ==
Shiv K. Kumar was born in Lahore, British India, in 1921. He matriculated from Dayanand Anglo Vedic High School in 1937. He studied for his B.A. at Government College, Lahore and his M.A. at Forman Christian College, Lahore (1943).

== Career ==
In 1943, he joined D.A.V. College Lahore as a lecturer, but moved to Delhi during the partition. After brief stints as lecturer at Hansraj College, Delhi, and as programme officer at the All India Radio, Delhi, he left India to join Fitzwilliam College, Cambridge in 1950. In 1956, he received his PhD in English Literature from the University of Cambridge. The topic of his dissertation was 'Bergson and the Stream of Consciousness Novel'. His research supervisor was Professor David Daiches. He was also tutored by the influential British critic F.R. Leavis during his stay in Cambridge.

Shiv K. Kumar worked as a professor and chair of the department English literature at Osmania University Hyderabad primarily from 1959 to 1976 . Subsequently, he was the founder Head of the department of English at the University of Hyderabad, acting as its vice - chancellor and first dean of humanities until his retirement in 1980 . He returned to serve as a UGC emeritus professor of English at Osmania University from 1984 to 1986 .During 1972–74, he was a UGC National Lecturer in English. He was the "Distinguished Visiting Professor" at the Universities of Oklahoma and Northern Iowa, and Visiting Professor at the Universities of Drake, Hofstra, Marshall, etc. He was also a visiting fulbright fellow at Yale University. He was nominated as a member of the Jury for the Neustadt International Prize for Literature (USA, 1981).

Several of his poems and short stories have been broadcast over the BBC—and published in Indian, British, American, Canadian and Australian journals and magazines. They have also been translated into several Indian and foreign languages.

In 1978, he was elected as a fellow of the Royal Society of Literature, London during his stay in England as Commonwealth Visiting Professor of English at the University of Kent at Canterbury. He received the Sahitya Akademi Award in 1987 for his collection of poems Trapfalls in the Sky. In 2001, he was awarded with the Padma Bhushan for his contribution to literature.

He lived in Hyderabad and was married to Madhu and they had two children.

== Works ==
His published works include:

As Poet :

- Articulate Silences, Writers Workshop, Calcutta, 1970
- Cobwebs in the Sun, Tata McGraw-Hill, New Delhi, 1974
- Subterfuges, Oxford University Press, New Delhi, 1976 (includes the oft anthologised poem Indian Women)
- Woodpeckers, Sidgwick & Jackson, London, 1979
- Trapfalls in the Sky, Macmillan, Madras, 1986 (Sahitya Akademi Award for English, 1987; translated into Hindi, Urdu, Tamil, Kannada and Malayalam.)
- Woolgathering, Orient Longman, Hyderabad, 1995
- Thus Spake the Buddha, UBSPD, New Delhi, 2001
- Losing My Way, Peacock Books, New Delhi, 2008
- Voice of Buddha: A Poetic Transcreation of The Dhammapada, Atlantic, New Delhi, 2008
- Intezar (A Collection of Poems in Urdu), Educational Publishing House, New Delhi, 2009
- Tum Kaho Main Sunoon (A Collection of Poems in Urdu), Educational Publishing House, New Delhi, 2010
- Which of My Selves Do You Wish to Speak to? Selected Poems, Penguin Books, New Delhi, 2011
- Mujasma-e-Husn (A Collection of Poems in Urdu), (MS)
- Where Have the Dead Gone?, (MS)

His individual poems have appeared in The New York Times, Poetry Review (London), Ariel, Southern Review, Hemisphere Meanjin, Western Humanities Review, Trafika (Prague), etc.

As Playwright:

- The Last Wedding Anniversary, Macmillan, 1975. Produced by the Indian National Theatre, and also translated into Urdu as Shaadi Ki Akhri Saal Girah, Shero Hikmat, Hyderabad, 1977.

As Novelist:

- The Bone's Prayer, Arnold Heinemann, 1979. Also translated into Hindi as Atmahatya, Rajpal & Sons, New Delhi, 1980.
- Nude Before God, Vanguard Press, New York, 1983—and Penguin Books, New Delhi, 1987
- A River with Three Banks, UBSPD, New Delhi, 1998—Translated into Hindi as Teen Kinaron Vali Nadi, Saransh, New Delhi, 1999
- Infatuation, UBSPD, New Delhi, 2000.
- Two Mirrors at the Ashram, Penguin, New Delhi, 2007
- Rough Passage to the Bodhi Tree (The Buddha: From Renunciation to Enlightenment), (MS)

As Short Story Writer:

- Beyond Love & Other Stories, Vikas, New Delhi, 1980
- To Nun with Love & Other Stories, Orient Longman, Hyderabad, 2001
- Face Behind the Mirror & Other Stories, (MS)

As Translator:

- Selected Poems of Faiz Ahmed Faiz (Urdu to English)

As Critic:

- Bergson and the Stream of Consciousness Novel, New York University Press, New York, 1963
- Critical Approaches to Fiction (edited in collaboration with Keith F. McKean), McGraw-Hill, New York, 1969—and several other works of literary criticism.

His research papers have appeared in such scholarly journals as Modern Philology, Modern Language Review, Journal of Aesthetics & Art Criticism, Modern Language Quarterly, Modern Language Notes, English Studies, etc.

Miscellaneous:

- The Mahabharata, HarperCollins, New Delhi, 2011. Also being translated into Hindi, Telugu, Malayalam, Marathi, Bengali, Tamil, etc.
- Conversations with Celebrities, (MS)

Critical Books on Shiv K. Kumar:

- Prabhat K. Singh, A Passage to Shiv K. Kumar (Swarup & Sons), New Delhi, 2001
- Bijay K. Das, Shiv K. Kumar as a Post-Colonial Poet (Atlantic), New Delhi, 2001
- R. Shankar, Shiv K. Kumar's Poetry: Imagery and Symbolism (ABD), Jaipur, 2010
- The Journal of South Asian Literature (Michigan) brought out a special issue on his writings in 1990.

== Appearances in the following poetry anthologies ==
- The Golden Treasure of Writers Workshop Poetry (2008) ed. by Rubana Huq and published by Writers Workshop, Calcutta
- A New Book of Indian Poems In English (2000) ed. by Gopi Kottoor and published by Poetry Chain and Writers Workshop, Calcutta
- Ten Twentieth-Century Indian Poets (1976) ed. by R. Parthasarathy and published by Oxford University Press, New Delhi

== See also ==
- Indian English Literature
- Indian Writing in English
