= Vihang A. Naik =

Indian poet (born 1969)

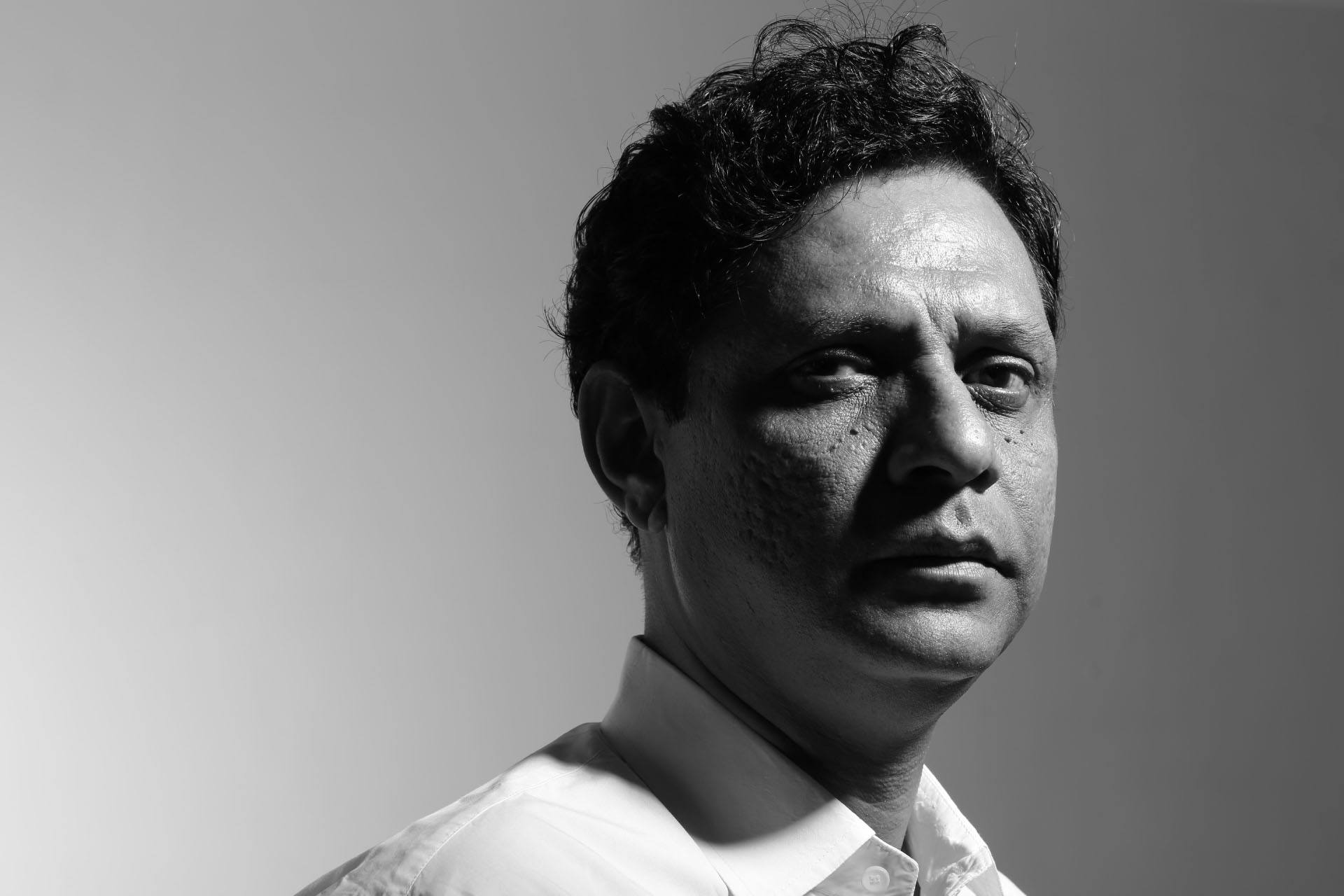
- Poet Vihang Naik
- Born: 2 September 1969 (age 56); Surat, Gujarat, India
- Education: MA (English)
- Alma mater: The M S University
- Occupations: Poet, translator, educator
- Writing career
- Language: English, Gujarati
- Period: 21st century
- Genre: Poetry
- Notable works: City Times and Other Poems; Jeevangeet; Making A Poem
- Notable awards: Limca Book of Records (2016); Kalinga Lit Fest (2019)

Vihang A. Naik or Vihang Ashokbhai Naik (2 September 1969) is a modern bilingual poet from Gujarat, India. He has authored many collections of poetry in English and Gujarati, besides translating poems from Gujarati into English. He died in the year 2021.

== Biography ==
Vihang A. Naik was born on September 2, 1969 at Surat, in Gujarat into a Gujarati family in Surat. His father was Sri Ashok bhai Naik and his mother, Smt. Jyothshana Jadeja. Sri Alkesh was his brother's name. From Surat, he moved to Baroda, Ahmedabad and other cities out of Gujarat. He did his matriculation from a local school in Vadodara, obtained a bachelor's degree in arts (English Literature and Philosophy) and master's degree (English Literature and Indian Literature in English Translation) from Maharaja Sayajirao University of Baroda. He taught English in various colleges of North Gujarat. He retired in 2019.

Naik has translated his own Gujarati Poetry "Jeevangeet" into English. His poetry is included in various anthologies, literary journals and magazines such as Anthology of Contemporary Indian Poetry, The Dance of the Peacock, The Indian P.E.N.,The Journal of Poetry Society (India),The Journal of Literature and Aesthetics, Indian Literature, The Brown Critique, Poetry Chain, Kavya Bharati, The Journal of Indian Writing In English, Coldnoon: Travel Poetics, Muse India etc.

== Awards ==
Vihang Naik has won several awards for his poetry including Michael Madhusudan Dutt Prize, 1998, Beverely Hills Book Award 2016, Book Excellence Award 2017 and Konark Literary Fest Award 2019.

In 2016 his poetry collection City Times and Other Poems entered Limca Book of Records for the poem "Self Portrait" which was composed of only five blank pages.

== Bibliography ==
=== Poetry books ===
- City Times and Other Poems first published by Kolkata: Writers Workshop, India 1993.
- Poetry Manifesto (New & Selected Poems), published by Indialog Publications Pvt Ltd, New Delhi, 2010.
- Making A Poem (Mumbai: Allied Publishers, 2004)
- Jeevangeet (Gujarati poetry), published by Navbharat Sahitya Mandir, Ahmedabad, 2001.

=== Poetry anthologies ===
- Travelogue : The Grand Indian Express (2017) ed. by Dr. Ananad Kumar and published by Authorspress, New Delhi
- Anthology of Contemporary Indian Poetry (2004) ed. by Menka Shivdasani and published by Michael Rothenberg, Big Bridge United States.
- The Dance of the Peacock: An Anthology of English Poetry from India (2013) ed. by Vivekanand Jha and published by Hidden Brook Press, Canada.
- Scaling Heights : An Anthology of Contemporary Indian English Poetry (2013) eds. by Dr. Gopal Lahiri and Dr.Kirti Sengupta and published by Authorspress, New Delhi
- Exiled Among Natives (2013) eds. by Prof. Charu Sheel Singh, Dr. Binod Mishra and published by Adhyayan Publishers, New Delhi
- The Golden Treasure of Writers Workshop Poetry (2008) ed. by Rubana Huq and published by Writers Workshop, Calcutta
- A New Book of Indian Poems In English (2000) ed. by Gopi Kottoor and published by Poetry Chain and Writers Workshop, Calcutta
- Accent on Indian English Poetry (1998) ed. by Ed. H. S. Shivaprakash and published by Indian Literature Special issue (No.4. issue 186 ) Sahitya Akademi, New Delhi
- A Decade of Poetry (1997–98) eds. Prabhanjan K. Mishra, Menka Shivdasani, Jerry Pinto and Ranjit Hoskote Special edition (Vols. 6 and 7) of Poiesis : A Journal of Poetry Circle, Bombay

=== Interviews ===
- Edexllive (The New Indian Express) (2019), Book Talk : Poems on how to write poems: Why you should read this award-winning poet's latest book
- Modern Research Studies: An International Journal of Humanities and Social Sciences(2017) Interview: Unfolding the World of Vihang A. Naik: Interview of an Indian Poet by Goutam Karmakar
- Muse India(2016), Interview: Vihang A. Naik in conversation with Dr. Ajit Kumar
- The Achievers Journal (2015), Book Talk : Vihang A. Naik on Cit Times and Other Poems

=== Further reading ===
- Goutam Karmakar, The Poetry of Vihang A. Naik: New Literary Dimensions (New Delhi : Authorspress, 2018)
- Sanjay P. Pandey, Vihang A Naik: A Study of his Mind and Art (New Delhi : Authorspress, 2018)

== See also ==
- Indian English Poetry
- Indian poetry in English
- Indian English Literature
- Indian literature
