= Samartha Vashishtha =

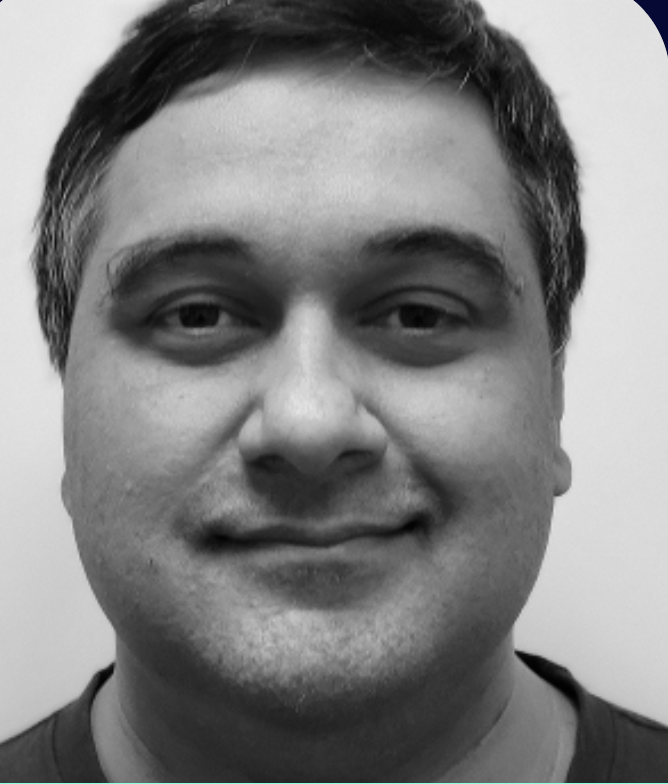
- Samartha in 2024
- Born: 10 June 1983 (age 43); Nabha, Punjab, India
- Occupations: Poet; Translator; Technology Professional
- Years active: 1999–present
- Awards: The Poetry Society (India)-Poetry Chain Annual Poetry Prize (2003) for the long poem Simla

Samartha Vashishtha (Hindi: समर्थ वाशिष्ठ | born June 10, 1983) is an Indian poet writing in English and Hindi, his mothertongue. He has published three volumes of poems; two in English — Anhadnad, a collection of his childhood poems in the year 2000 and Shadows Don't Live in Walls in 2004 — and a book of poems in Hindi titled Sapne Mein Piya Pani (Hindi: सपने में पिया पानी, Rajkamal Prakashan, 2017). He won a Poetry Chain-Poetry Society (India) Annual Poetry Prize in 2003 for his poem-sequence, Simla.

Samartha has also contributed extensively to prominent Indian literary journals. His work in English has appeared in Chandrabhaga edited by Jayanta Mahapatra, Sahitya Akademi's Indian Literature, The Journal of Literature and Aesthetics, The Journal of the Poetry Society (India) and Poetry Chain. His poems in Hindi have appeared in Pahal, an influential literary magazine brought out by Gyanaranjan from Jabalpur, Naya Gyanodaya, Vartaman Sahitya (Ghaziabad), and Sahitya Akademi's Samakaleen Bharatiya Sahitya besides several other publications.

== Works ==
Samartha has published three volumes of poetry:

- Anhadnad (a book of poems in English published in the year 2000)
- Shadows Don't Live in Walls (published in the year 2004)
- Sapne Mein Piya Pani (सपने में पिया पानी, a book of Hindi poems published by Rajkamal Prakashan in the year 2017)

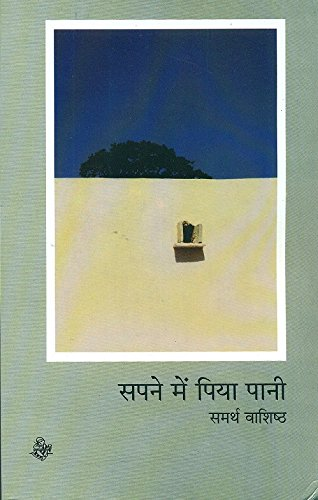
सपने में पिया पानी (English translation: Water Gulped in a Dream), Hindi poems by Samartha Vashishtha; published by Rajkamal Prakashan, 2017

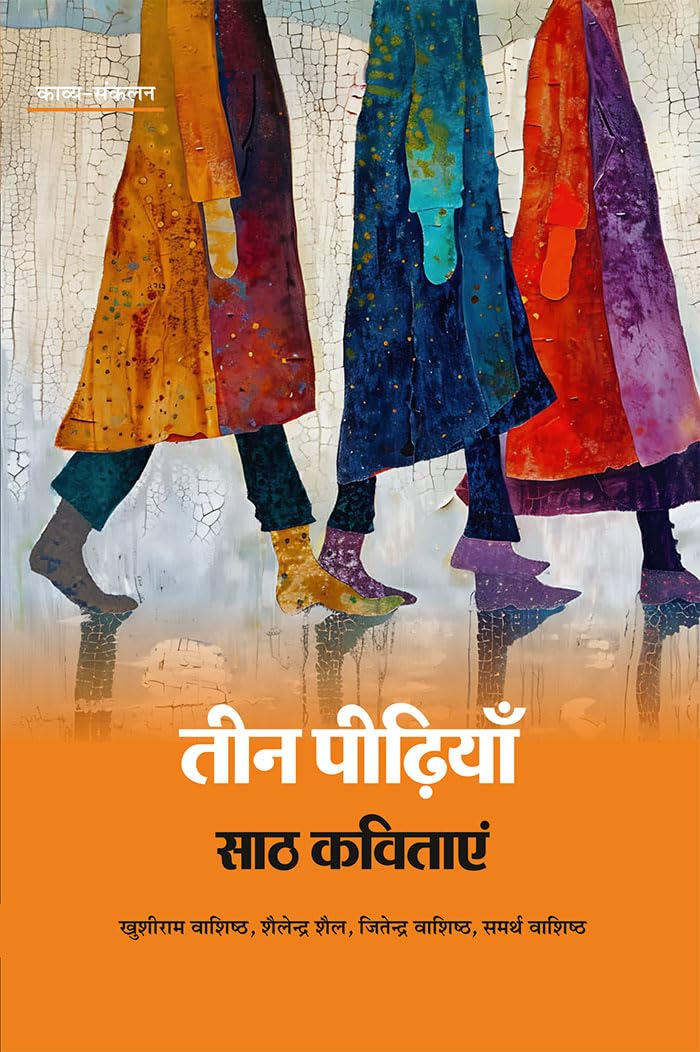
तीन पीढ़ियाँ, साठ कविताएं (English translation: Three Generations, Sixty Poems) – anthology bringing together selected poems from four established poets belonging to three generations of the Vashishtha family

In 2025, Samartha co-edited with Shailendra Shail a poetry anthology in Hindi titled Teen Peedhiyan Saathh Kavitayein (तीन पीढ़ियाँ, साठ कविताएं | English translation): Three Generations, Sixty Poems), bringing together poems from four established poets – Late Khushi Ram Vashishtha (खुशी राम वाशिष्ठ, Haryana's first State Poet), Shailendra Shail (शैलेन्द्र शैल), Late Jitendra Vashishtha (जितेन्द्र वाशिष्ठ), and himself – belonging to three generations of the same family.

== Translation ==
Samartha is a co-translator (along with Shailendra Shail) of Soumitra Mohan's long Hindi poem, Luqman Ali (लुक़मान अली) into English. The translation was published in Chandrabhaga 14/2007 and then in Asymptote. Luqman Ali is widely considered a landmark poem in Hindi literature, and Samartha's co-translation of it made it accessible to a new generation of readers. In the foreword to his volume of collected poems, आधा दिखता वह आदमी, Soumitra Mohan acknowledges the role of this translation in introducing Luqman Ali to an international readership.

Samartha has also translated the poetry of Langston Hughes into Hindi, and the works of Paash, Vyomesh Shukla and Asad Zaidi into English. He continues to work across three languages — English, Hindi and Punjabi — consistently striving to build bridges between their literatures.

== Personal life ==
Samartha was born in 1983 into a literary family. His grandfather, Prof. Khushi Ram Vashishtha (1916-2004), was a poet of repute in the Indian state of Haryana. In 1968, Prof. Vashishtha was bestowed with the honorary title of Rajya Kavi (State Poet of Haryana); the first of the only two poets to ever earn this honor. Samartha's father, Dr Jitendra Vashishtha (1953-2018), a renowned poet himself, published three volumes of poems in his lifetime, and left behind several unpublished manuscripts in the wake of his untimely death. Shailendra Shail, noted Hindi poet and memoirist, is Samartha's paternal uncle.

For over a decade, Samartha worked with Adobe Systems, where he led the user-assistance content activities for Photoshop, earning the informal title of "Chief Content Wrangler" on the credits splash screen for the 19.x releases. After subsequent stints with Expedia Group, Atlassian, and Facebook/Meta in London, he is currently working with Salesforce as their Director of Content Design for APAC. He currently lives in Bengaluru.

Samartha is married and has a daughter.
