= Meena Alexander =

Indian poet, scholar, and writer (1951–2018)

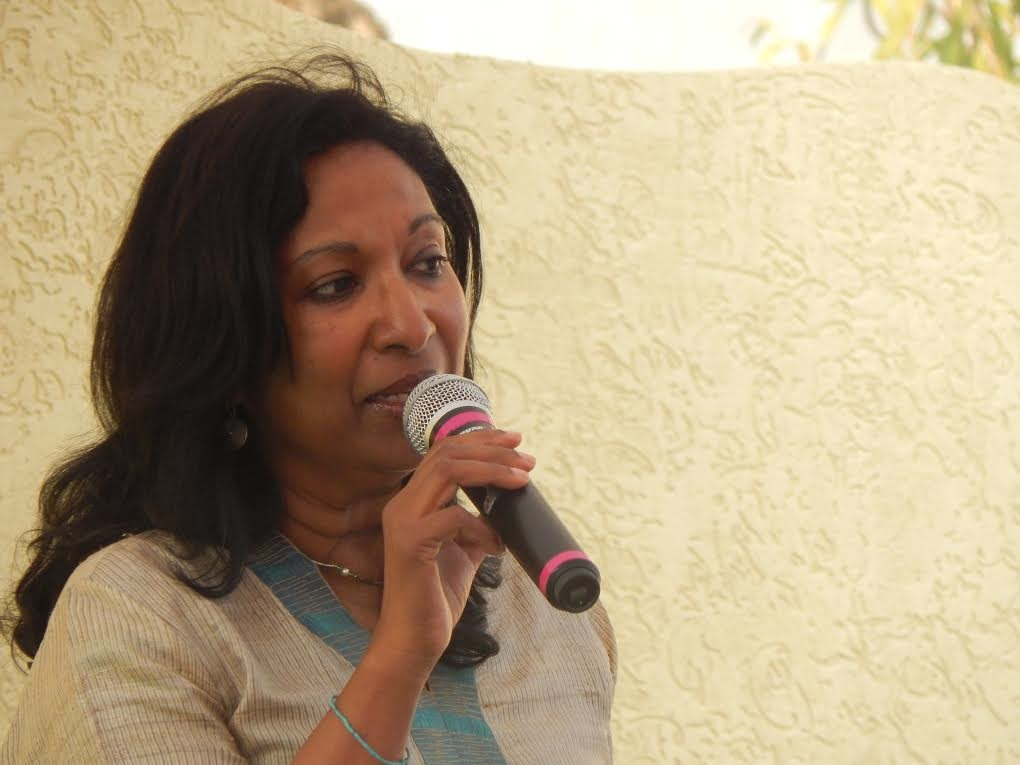
- Alexander at Hyderabad Literary Festival, 2016
- Born: Mary Elizabeth Alexander; 17 February 1951; Allahabad, Uttar Pradesh, India
- Died: 21 November 2018 (aged 67); New York City, New York, U.S.
- Citizenship: United States
- Education: University of Khartoum; University of Nottingham (PhD)
- Occupations: Poet; Author; Scholar; Essayist; Professor
- Writing career
- Language: English
- Notable works: Fault Lines: A Memoir; Illiterate Heart
- Notable awards: 2009 Distinguished Achievement Award, South Asian Literary Association; 2002 PEN Open Book Award
- Website: meenaalexander.commons.gc.cuny.edu

Meena Alexander (17 February 1951 – 21 November 2018) was an Indian American poet, scholar, and writer. Born in Allahabad, India, and raised in India and Sudan, Alexander later lived and worked in New York City, where she was a Distinguished Professor of English at Hunter College and the CUNY Graduate Center.

== Early life and education ==
Meena Alexander was born Mary Elizabeth Alexander on 17 February 1951 in Allahabad, India, to George and Mary (Kuruvilla) Alexander, originally from Travancore in India. Her father was a meteorologist for the Indian government and her mother was a homemaker. Her paternal grandmother was in an arranged marriage by age eight to her paternal grandfather, who was a wealthy landlord. Her maternal grandmother, Kunju, died before Alexander was born, and had both completed higher education and been the first woman to become a member of the legislative assembly in Travancore State. Her maternal grandfather was a theologian and social reformer who worked with Gandhi, and had been the principal of Marthoma Seminary in Kottayam; he gave Alexander a variety of books, and talked to her about serious topics such as mortality, the Buddha, and apocalypse, before he died when she was eleven years old.

Alexander lived in Allahabad and Kerala until she was five years old, when her family moved to Khartoum after her father accepted a post in the newly independent Sudan. She continued to visit her grandparents in Kerala, was tutored at home on speaking and writing English, and finished high school in Khartoum at age 13. Alexander recalled to Erika Duncan of World Literature Today that she began writing poetry as a child after she tried to mentally compose short stories in Malayalam but felt unable to translate them into written English; without an ability to write in Malayalam, she instead began writing her stories as poems.

She enrolled in Khartoum University at age 13, and had some poems she wrote translated into Arabic (a language she could not read) and then published in a local newspaper. At age 15, she officially changed her name from Mary Elizabeth to Meena, the name she had been called at home. In 1969, she completed a bachelor's degree in English and French from Khartoum University. She began her PhD at age 18 in England. In 1970, at age 19, she had what she described as "the time-honored tradition of a young intellectual ... having a nervous breakdown", where for more than a month she lost the ability to read and retreated to the country to rest. She completed her PhD in British Romantic literature in 1973 at age 22 from University of Nottingham.

After completing her PhD, Alexander returned to India, and was a lecturer in the English Department at Miranda House, University of Delhi in 1974, a lecturer in English and French at Jawaharlal Nehru University in 1975, a lecturer in English at the Central Institute of English at the University of Hyderabad, from 1975 to 1977, during the National Emergency in India, and a lecturer at the University of Hyderabad from 1977 to 1979. She published her first volumes of poetry in India through the Kolkata Writers Workshop, a publisher founded by P. Lal, a poet and professor of English at St. Xavier's College, Kolkata. She also met David Lelyveld, a historian on sabbatical from the University of Minnesota, while they were in Hyderabad, and they married in 1979. She then moved with her husband to New York City. In 2009, she reflected on her move to the United States in the late 1970s, stating "There was a whole issue of racism that shocked me out of my wits. I never thought of myself as a person of color. I was normally the majority where I lived."

== Career ==
Alexander wrote poetry, prose, and scholarly works in English. Ranjit Hoskote said of her poetry, "Her language drew as much on English as it did on Hindi and Malayalam – I always heard, in her poems, patterns of breath that seemed to come from sources in Gangetic India, where she spent part of her childhood, and her ancestral Malabar." Alexander spoke Malayalam fluently, but her ability to read and write in Malayalam was limited. She also spoke French, Sudanese Arabic and Hindi. While she lived in Khartoum, she had been taught to speak and write British English; in 2006, she told Ruth Maxey, "When I came to America, I found the language amazingly liberating. It was very exciting for me to hear American English, not that I can speak it well, but I think in it." In her 1992 essay, "Is there an Asian American Aesthetic?", she wrote of an "aesthetic of dislocation" as one aspect of the aesthetic, and "the other is that we have all come under the sign of America. [...] Here we are part of a minority, and the vision of being 'unselved' comes into our consciousness. It is from this consciousness that I create my work of art."

After moving to New York, Alexander was an assistant professor at Fordham University from 1980 until 1987, when she became an assistant professor in the English Department at Hunter College, City University of New York (CUNY). She became an associate professor in 1989, and a professor in 1992. Beginning in 1990, she also became a lecturer in writing at Columbia University. She was appointed Distinguished Professor of English at Hunter College in 1999.

Some of her best known poetry collections include Illiterate Heart (2002). She also wrote the collection Raw Silk (2004), which includes a set of poems that relate to the September 11 attacks and the time afterwards. In her 1986 collection House of a Thousand Doors: Poems and Prose Pieces, she republished several poems from her early works and her 1980 collection Stone Roots, as well as work previously published in journals in addition to new material. Alexander wrote two further books with poetry and prose: The Shock of Arrival: Reflections on Postcolonial Experience published in 1996, and Poetics of Dislocation published in 2009.

Alexander also published two novels, Nampally Road (1991), which was a Village Voice Literary Supplement Editor's Choice in 1991, and Manhattan Music (1997), as well as two academic studies: The Poetic Self: Towards a Phenomenology of Romanticism (1979), based on her dissertation, and Women in Romanticism: Mary Wollstonecraft, Dorothy Wordsworth and Mary Shelley (1989). In 1993, Alexander published her autobiographical memoir, Fault Lines, and published an expanded second edition in 2003, with new material that addressed her previously suppressed memories of childhood sexual abuse by her maternal grandfather and her reflections on the September 11 attacks. She also edited Indian Love Poems (2005) and Name Me A Word: Indian Writers Reflect on Writing (2018). Some of her poetry was adapted into music, including her poems "Impossible Grace" and "Acqua Alta". Her work was the subject of critical analysis in the book Passage to Manhattan: Critical Essays on Meena Alexander, edited by Lopamudra Basu and Cynthia Leenerts and published in 2009.

Alexander read her poetry and spoke at a variety of literary forums, including Poetry International (London), Struga Poetry Evenings, Poetry Africa, Calabash Festival, Harbor Front Festival, and Sahitya Akademi. In 2013, she addressed the Yale Political Union, in a speech titled, "What Use Is Poetry?", which was later published in slightly revised form in World Literature Today. In 1998 she was a Member of the Jury for the Neustadt International Prize for Literature. She served as an Elector, American Poets' Corner, at the Cathedral of Saint John the Divine, New York.

She died in New York on 21 November 2018, at the age of 67, and according to her husband, the cause was endometrial serous cancer. In 2020, her poetry collection In Praise of Fragments was published, which includes some work previously published in journals or staged as performances, as well as new material.

== Influences ==
Influences on her writing include Jayanta Mahapatra, Kamala Das, Adrienne Rich, Walt Whitman, and Galway Kinnell, as well as Toru Dutt, Lalithambika Antherjanam, Sarojini Naidu, Audre Lorde, Toni Morrison, Gloria Anzaldua, Leslie Marmon Silko, Assia Djebar, Edouard Glissant, Nawal El Saadawi, and Ngugi wa Thiong'o. In 2014, she discussed the influence of John Donne, John Berryman, Emily Dickinson, and Matsuo Bashō on her poetic work.

== Fellowships and residencies ==
During the course of her career, Alexander was a University Grants Commission Fellow at Kerala University, Writer in Residence at the National University of Singapore, and a Frances Wayland Collegium Lecturer at Brown University. She also held the Martha Walsh Pulver Residency for a poet at Yaddo. In addition:

- 1979 Visiting fellow at the University of Paris-Sorbonne
- 1988 Center for American Culture Studies, Columbia University, Writer in Residence
- 1993 MacDowell Colony fellow
- 1994 American College, Madurai, India, Poet in Residence
- 1995 Arts Council of England, International Writer in Residence
- 1995 Intercultural Resource Center, Columbia University, Artist/Humanist In Residence
- 1995 Minnesota Asian American Renaissance, Lila Wallace Writer in Residence
- 2003 Rockefeller Foundation Bellagio Residency
- 2008 Guggenheim Foundation Fellow
- 2011 Fulbright Specialists Program
- 2014 National Fellow at the Indian Institute of Advanced Study, Shimla
- 2016 Poet in Residence in Venice

== Honors and awards ==
Fault Lines, her memoir, was chosen by Publishers Weekly as one of the Best Books of 1993, and her poetry collection Illiterate Heart won the 2002 PEN Open Book Award. In 2002, she was awarded the Imbongi Yesizwe Poetry International Award. She was the recipient of the 2009 Distinguished Achievement Award from the South Asian Literary Association for contributions to American literature. In 2016, she received a Word Masala award from the Word Masala Foundation. On 1 May 2024, she was honored with a Google Doodle, in honor of it being the first day of Asian American, Native Hawaiian and Pacific Islander Heritage Month.

== Selected works ==
=== Poetry ===
==== Early work ====
- The Bird’s Bright Ring (1976) (long poem)
- I Root My Name (Calcutta: United Writers, 1977) (collection)
- Without Place (Calcutta: Writers Workshop, 1977) (long poem)
- In the Middle Earth (New Delhi: Enact, 1977) (performance piece)

==== Collections ====
- Alexander, Meena (1981). Stone Roots. Arnold-Heinemann, India. ISBN 978-0862491093.
- Alexander, Meena (1988). House of a Thousand Doors: Poems and Prose Pieces. Three Continents Press. ISBN 9780894105548.
- Alexander, Meena (1996). River and Bridge. TSAR Publications. ISBN 978-0920661567.
- Alexander, Meena (2002). Illiterate Heart. TriQuarterly. ISBN 978-0810151178.
- Alexander, Meena (2004). Raw Silk. TriQuarterly. ISBN 978-0810151567.
- Alexander, Meena (2008). Quickly Changing River. TriQuarterly. ISBN 978-0810124509.
- Alexander, Meena (2013). Birthplace with Buried Stones. TriQuarterly/ Northwestern University. ISBN 978-0-8101-5239-7.
- Alexander, Meena (2018). Atmospheric Embroidery. TriQuarterly. ISBN 978-0810137608.
- Alexander, Meena (2020). In Praise of Fragments. Nightboat Books. ISBN 978-1643620121.

==== Chapbooks ====
- Alexander, Meena (1989). The Storm: A Poem in Five Parts. New York: Red Dust. ISBN 9780873760621.
- Alexander, Meena (1992). Night-Scene, the Garden. New York: Red Dust. ISBN 978-0873760744.
- Alexander, Meena (2011). Otto poesie da «Quickly changing river» (in Italian). Translated by Fazzini, Marco. Sinopia di Venezia. ISBN 9788895495330.
- Impossible Grace: Jerusalem Poems (Al-Quds University, 2012)
- Shimla (2012)
- Alexander, Meena (2015). Dreaming in Shimla: Letter to my Mother. Indian Institute of Advanced Study. ISBN 978-9382396314.

=== Poetry and essays ===
- Alexander, Meena (1996). The Shock of Arrival: Reflections on Postcolonial Experience. South End Press. ISBN 978-0-89608-545-9.
- Alexander, Meena (2009). Poetics of Dislocation. University of Michigan Press. ISBN 978-0472070763.

=== Novels ===
- Alexander, Meena (1991). Nampally Road. Mercury House. ISBN 978-0-916515-82-9.
- Alexander, Meena (1996). Manhattan Music. Mercury House. ISBN 978-1-56279-092-9.

=== Memoirs ===
- Alexander, Meena (1993). Fault Lines. Feminist Press. ISBN 1-55861-058-8.
- Alexander, Meena, wa Thiong'o, Ngũgĩ (2003). Fault Lines (2nd ed.). The Feminist Press. ISBN 978-1558614543.

=== Criticism ===
- Alexander, Meena (1979). The Poetic Self: Towards a Phenomenology of Romanticism. Atlantic Highlands, N.J.: Humanities Press. ISBN 9780391017542.
- Alexander, Meena (1989). Women in Romanticism: Mary Wollstonecraft, Dorothy Wordsworth and Mary Shelley. Basingstoke: Macmillan Education. ISBN 9780333391693.

=== Edited works ===
- Alexander, Meena, ed. (2005). Indian Love Poems. New York: Alfred A. Knopf. ISBN 9781400042258. (US) ISBN 9781841597577 (UK)
- Alexander, Meena, ed. (2018). Name Me A Word: Indian Writers Reflect on Writing. New Haven: Yale University Press. ISBN 9780300222586.

=== Prefaces and introductory notes ===
- Introduction to Truth Tales: Stories by Contemporary Indian Women Writers (Feminist Press, 1990)
- Foreword to Miriam Cooke and Roshni Rustomji-Kerns (eds), Blood into Ink, Twentieth Century South Asian and Middle Eastern Women Write War (Westview Press, 1994)
- "Bodily Inventions: A Note on the Poems", Special Issue of The Asian Pacific American Journal vol. 5 no. 1, Spring/Summer 1996
- Preface to Cast Me Out If You Will!: Stories and Memoir Pieces by Lalithambika Antherjanam (Feminist Press, 1998)
- Foreword to Indian Love Poems (Knopf, 2005)

=== Appearances in poetry anthologies ===
- Gopi Kottoor, ed. (2000). A New Book of Indian Poems in English. Writers Workshop. ISBN 9788175957282.
- Anand Kumar, ed. (2017). Travelogue : The Grand Indian Express. Authorspress. ISBN 978-9381030776.

=== Appearances in periodicals ===
Title	Year	First published	Reprinted/collected
"Acqua Alta"	2008	Alexander, Meena. Quickly Changing River (TriQuarterly Books/Northwestern University Press, 2008)	Kejriwal, Rohini (19 November 2017). "Five poems (or five ways) to go to the sea in November". Scroll.in.
"Lady Dufferin's Terrace"	2011	Alexander, Meena (5 September 2011). "Lady Dufferin's Terrace". The New Yorker.	Alexander, Meena (2013). Birthplace with Buried Stones. TriQuarterly/ Northwestern University. ISBN 978-0-8101-5239-7.
"Experimental Geography"	2013	Alexander, Meena (16 September 2013). "Weekly Poem: 'Experimental Geography'". PBS NewsHour.	Alexander, Meena (2013). Birthplace with Buried Stones. TriQuarterly/ Northwestern University. ISBN 978-0-8101-5239-7.
"Kochi by the sea"	2018	Alexander, Meena (12–19 February 2018). "Kochi by the sea". The New Yorker. Vol. 94, no. 1. pp. 44–45.	
"Where Do You Come From?"	2018	Alexander, Meena (4 July 2018). "Where Do You Come From?". Poetry Foundation.	
"Grandmother’s Garden, Section 18"	2020	Alexander, Meena (23 January 2020). "Poem: Grandmother's Garden, Section 18". The New York Times Magazine.	

== Critical reception ==
Alexander was described as "undoubtedly one of the finest poets of contemporary times" in 2015 by The Statesman. About her work, Maxine Hong Kingston said: "Meena Alexander sings of countries, foreign and familiar, places where the heart and spirit live, and places for which one needs a passport and visas. Her voice guides us far away and back home. The reader sees her visions and remembers and is uplifted." Of the poems in her book Atmospheric Embroidery, A. E. Stallings wrote: "Alexander's language is precise, her syntax is pellucid, and her poems address all of the senses, offering a simultaneous richness and simplicity." Vijay Seshadri wrote: "The beautiful paradox of Meena Alexander’s art has always been found in the distillation of her epic human and spiritual experience into pure and exquisite lyricism. That paradox and that lyricism are on triumphant display in this book." As to the anthology she edited, Name Me A Word: Indian Writers Reflect on Writing, Simon Gikandi wrote: "Name Me A Word is an indispensable guide for readers of Indian writing, animating the powerful impulses of the country's famous writers and introducing the multiple voices that went into the making of the most important literature of our time."

=== Critical studies of Alexander's work ===
- Passage to Manhattan: Critical Essays on Meena Alexander. Lopamudra Basu and Cynthia Leenerts (eds). Cambridge Scholars Publishing, 2009.
- Maxey, Ruth (2011). South Asian Atlantic Literature, 1970-2010. Edinburgh University Press. hdl:20.500.12657/31775. ISBN 9781474423557.
- Guiyou Huang, ed., Asian-American Poets: A Bio-Bibliographical Critical Sourcebook (Greenwood Press, 2002)

== Personal life ==
At the time of her death, Alexander was survived by her mother, her husband, their children Adam Lelyveld and Svati Lelyveld, and her sister Elizabeth Alexander.

== See also ==
- Indian English Literature
- Indian literature
- Indian poetry in English
