= Pahal =

Pahal may refer to:

- Pahal, another name for the Hindu goddess Lakshmi
- Pahal (magazine), a Hindi literary magazine
- PAHAL, a direct benefit transfer scheme in India; see Aadhaar
- Pahal, Iran
