= Jai Zharotia =

Indian painter and artist (1945–2021)

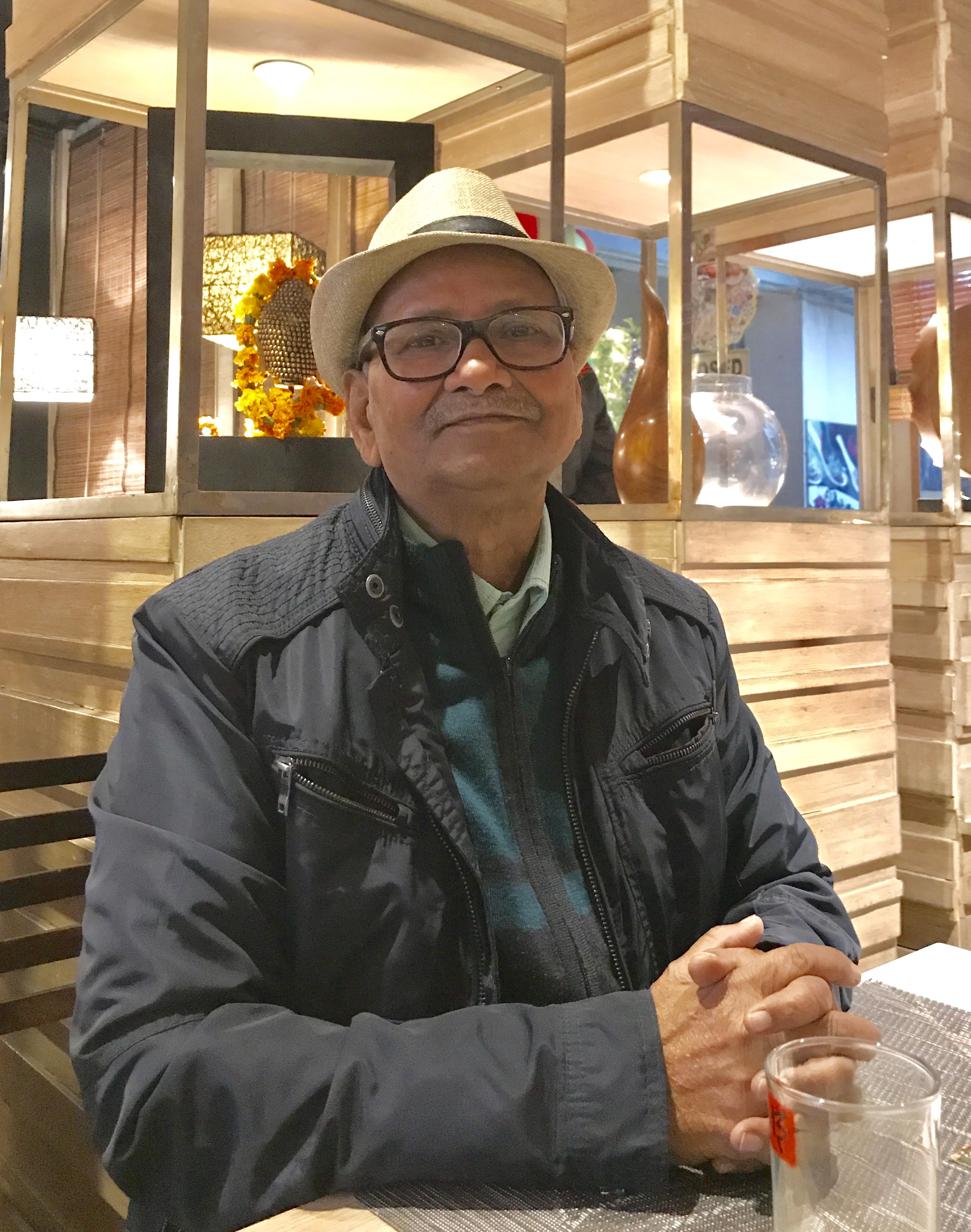
- Jai Zharotia in 2017
- Born: 1945; New Delhi, India
- Died: 27 March 2021 (aged 75–76)
- Known for: Paintings, drawings, ceramics and poetry
- Spouse: Kanta Zharotia

Jai Zharotia (1945 - 27 March 2021) was an Indian painter and artist. He was awarded the Sahitya Kala Parishad Award and he was a recipient of the National Award of the Lalit Kala Akademi. He was also a printmaker and sculptor and had also a special interest in poetry and wrote in Hindi.

== Biography ==
Zharotia was born in 1945 in New Delhi. He graduated in fine arts from the Delhi College of Art. He served as an art teacher at the Bal Bhavan before becoming a lecturer at Alma Mater in 1974. After a couple of years he became a professor and head of the painting department at the same university in 2005.

Zharotia died on 27 March 2021, due to cardiac arrest.

== Work ==
Zharotia's work has been represented in the collection of the National Gallery of Modern Art, Delhi, Lalit Kala Akademi, and Sahitya Kala Parishad. Zharotia was also known for illustrating short stories by Nirmal Verma and Bertold Brecht. He took keen interest in poetry and wrote in Hindi. Zharotia was frequently involved in children's educational projects as an educationist. In his works, a series of icons that are drawn from the physical world, which, when interpreted by him, change almost magically representing a world that exists only in the furthest reaches of his imagination. His works feature clowns, jugglers and puppeteers that reveal his empathy for the tragicomic figures.

=== Luqman series ===
Luqman Ali is another fascinated character, fictitious and yet so real. Luqman was invented by the poet Soumitra Mohan as a character perpetually in search of himself. By way of fantasy, Luqman attempts to overcome childhood fears, his inadequacies, and contradictions. Luqman is hero and villain, active and passive, with positive and negative shades, challenged by mysterious forces and unknown enemies. Often hounded by his own shadow and apparition, he tries but fails to cut his desire with a sword or protect his moral life through sheer physical power. A trickster of sorts, a dreamer at times, Luqman for Jai represents the duality of life, the friction between good and evil, escapes and surrender.
