= Relar Alir Dubori Bon =

1993 Indian assamese language film

- Directed by: Pulak Gogoi
- Written by: Pulak Gogoi
- Screenplay by: Pulak Gogoi
- Story by: Syed Abdul Malik
- Produced by: Pulak Gogoi
- Starring: Amitabh Gogoi; Dipika Sarma; Upakul Bardoloi
- Cinematography: Ajan Baruah
- Music by: Dasarth Das
- Release date: 1993
- Running time: 99 minutes
- Country: India
- Language: Assamese
- Budget: Rs.4,35,000
- Box office: Rs.9 lac (approx.)

Relar Alir Dubori Bon (Assamese: ৰেলৰ আলিৰ দুবৰি বন) is a 1993 Assamese language drama film, directed and produced by Pulak Gogoi. The music was composed by Dasharath Das. The songs of the film were sung by Bollywood singers Kumar Sanu and Kavita Krishnamurthy.

== Plot ==
Karthik is a motor mechanic. He falls in love with Rekha. Rekha's mother is Phukan's mistress. Karthik once saved Rekha from Phukan's sexual harassment.

One day Kartik was talking to a friend about the upcoming elections; the election in which Phukan is also contesting. He was against Phukan. On learning of this, Phukan attacks Kartik and orders his driver to throw his unconscious body on the road. With the help of the driver, Rekha takes him to a safe place.

Kartik is grateful for the help of Rekha. But he feels that there was no point in living on earth for a lowly man like him. He lies down on the railway track with the intention of committing suicide.

== Award ==
- Best Feature Film in Assamese (1992
