= Soumitra =

Soumitra may refer to:

- Saumitra or Lakshmana, character in the ancient Indian epic Ramayana, the son of Sumitra
- Soumitra Chatterjee (1935–2020), Indian film actor known for his association with Satyajit Ray
- Soumitra Dutta, Indian author, academic, and businessman
- Soumitra Mohan (born 1938), Indian poet in Hindi
- Soumitra Sen (born 1958), retired judge of the Calcutta High Court
