= Ayyappa Paniker =

Indian poet and critic (1930–2006)

K. Ayyappa Paniker
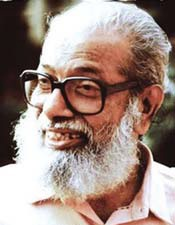
- Born: 12 September 1930; Kavalam, Kerala, India
- Died: 23 August 2006 (aged 75); Thiruvananthapuram, Kerala, India
- Other names: Ayyappa Panicker കേശവപണിക്കർ അയ്യപ്പ പണിക്കർ
- Education: University of Kerala; Indiana University Bloomington
- Occupations: Poet; literary critic; academic; scholar; reader
- Known for: Malayalam poetry
- Notable work: Kurukshethram; Ayyappapanikkarude Krithikal; Chintha

Ayyappa Paniker

Academic background
- Education: Malabar Christian College; University of Kerala; Indiana University
- Thesis: Poetry of Robert Lowell
- Doctoral advisor: Robert E. Gross.

Academic work
- Doctoral students: V. C. Harris; Chandramathi

Kavalam Ayyappa Paniker, sometimes spelt Ayyappa Panicker (12 September 1930 – 23 August 2006), was a Malayalam poet, literary critic, and an academic and a scholar in modern and post-modern literary theories as well as ancient Indian aesthetics and literary traditions. He was one of the pioneers of modernism in Malayalam poetry, where his seminal works like Kurukshethram (1960), is considered a turning point in Malayalam poetry. Many of Ayyappa Paniker's poems and his several essays were an important influence on later generations of Malayalam writers. His poems often reflected his deep concern for the environment with works such as Kadevide Makkale -Malayalam കാടെവിടെ മക്കളെ (Where are the forests?)

In an academic career which ran in consonance with his literary one, and spanned four decades, he taught in various colleges and universities before retiring as the Director, Institute of English, University of Kerala. He published over 25 works, translated several important work to Malayalam, including Guru Granth Sahib and a book in French; as a scholarly editor he produced numerous anthologies on Indian literature, he was the chief editor of the Sahitya Akademi's Indian Literary Encyclopaedia. Another important work by him Indian Narratology, published by IGNCA, was the first of its kind to study various forms of the art of narration, in Indian literature, starting with Vedic and oral literature to Buddhist and contemporary literature.

== Early life and education ==
Paniker (his preferred spelling) was born in Kavalam near Alappuzha to E. Naryanan of Periyamana Illam, and M. Meenakshiamma. Fourth of the eight children, six of them girls, he grew up without any paternal affection, while his mother died when he was 12 years old, this early anguish and solitude deeply reflected in his poetry, which he started writing when he was in high school.

The Kavalam village, was also home to people like, K. M. Panikkar, historian and administrator, and playwright and poet, Kavalam Narayana Panicker, his cousin. He published his first poem at the age of 16, published in the Mathrubhoomi Weekly. He did his Intermediate at Malabar Christian College, Kozhikode, and BA Honours in English Literature at the University College, Thiruvananthapuram in 1951, thereafter he received his master's degree from the University of Kerala.

Paniker took his doctorate from Indiana University Bloomington from 1969 to 1971 with a doctoral dissertation on the poetry of Robert Lowell, supervised by Robert E. Gross, subsequently he did post-doctoral research in Yale and Harvard University (1981–82).

== Career ==
Leaders, selfish and opportunistic,
tell us that life is for doing good,
that good is nothing but social good.
If we are clever in spreading the net,
we can have a good haul.

— Ayyappa Paniker

Paniker joined CMS College, Kottayam as a lecturer of English in 1951, after working there for a year, he joined the Mahatma Gandhi College, Thiruvananthapuram. He started teaching at the University College, in Thiruvananthapuram in 1952, and did so until 1965. At this point, he became a Professor at the Institute of English and Head of the department in University of Kerala (1965–74). In 1974, he became Reader in English, at the Institute of English under University of Kerala, a post he held till 1980, when he became Dean of Faculty of Arts in the University of Kerala, he retired in 1990.

Through his long career he lectured in many national and international universities, including around 25 universities in US, where came across poets James Dickey, John Hollander, Czeslaw Milosz and Allen Ginsberg.

== Awards and recognition ==
Paniker was a recipient of a number of honours including the Padma Shri, Kerala Sahitya Akademi award for poetry and criticism, Kendriya Sahitya Akademi Award for poetry, 2005 Saraswati Samman for his collection of writings Ayyappa Panikerude Krithikal, Distinguished Teacher award, Mahakavi Ulloor award for poetry, Kabir Samman, International Man of the Year (IBC, Cambridge, United Kingdom), Indira Gandhi Memorial Fellowship with lead to the book, Indian Narratology published by IGNCA, Gangadhar Meher National Award for poetry, Asan Prize and Jana Sanskriti Award (Abu Dhabi), Vayalar Award, Pandalam Keralavarma award and Vallathol Award. 2015 was conducted in memory of him.

== Personal life ==
He died in Thiruvananthapuram (Trivandrum) on 23 August 2006 at the age of 76 and was survived by his wife and two children. He was cremated the following day in his native village, Kavalam, in a plot he had set apart twelve years ago for the purpose, on the western side of his traditional family house, Olickal tharavad. The house finds reference in several of his works, especially in his poem 'Kavalam' in the anthology Pathumanippookkal.

== Legacy ==
Ayyapa Foundation was formed in 2006 in Thiruvananthapuram, to promote his work and Malayalam poetry. The January 2007 issue of journal Samyukta, was dedicated entirely to him, it contained 10 critical essays on him and his work, besides three collections of his verse in English translation, one of which, Poetry at Midnight published for the first time. It also contained a 36-page bibliography of his oeuvre. In September 2009, Sitakant Mahapatra delivered the "Ayyappa Paniker commemorative speech 2009" at Thiruvananthapuram. Every thing is past tense by Rati Saxena, the first book written by Rati Saxena about Ayyappa paniker. she has translated his 5 books in to HIndi. The popular poetry journal Poetry Chain was established by Gopi Kottoor in memory of Ayyappa Paniker.

== Bibliography ==
- Selected poems of Ayyappa Paniker. Modern Book Centre, 1985.
- Indian Renaissance. Facet Books. 1988. ISBN 0-932377-31-9.
- A perspective of Malayalam literature. Annu Chithra Publications, 1990.
- Kathakali, the art of the non-worldly, with D. Appukuttan Nair, Pankaj Shah, Sangeet Natak Akademi. Marg Publications, 1993. ISBN 818502622X.
- Indian Narratology. Indira Gandhi National Centre for the Arts, Sterling Publishers. 2003. ISBN 81-207-2502-6.
- Agnipujayum Mattu Pradhaana Kavithakalum (Malayalam). Dc Books. ISBN 81-264-1623-8.
- Ayyappapanikerude Krithikal Volume 1 (1951–1969) (Malayalam). Dc Books. ISBN 81-7130-134-7.
- Ayyappapanikerude Krithikal Volume 2 (1969–1981) (Malayalam). Dc Books. ISBN 81-7130-366-8.
- Ayyappapanikerude Krithikal Volume 3 (1981–1989) (Malayalam). Dc Books. ISBN 81-7130-595-4.
- Ayyappapanikerude Krithikal Volume 4 (1990–1999) (Malayalam). Dc Books. ISBN 81-264-0065-X.
- Ayyappapanikerude Kavithakal Volume 5 (2000–2006) (Malayalam). Dc Books. (Last poems, written during 2000–2006 compiled by his daughter Kumari M.).
- Viswasahithyangaliloode-1 (Malayalam). Dc Books. ISBN 81-264-1315-8.
- Viswasahithyangaliloode-2 (Malayalam). Dc Books. ISBN 81-264-1316-6.
- Poetry at Midnight (Tr of Pathumanippookkal) Tr by P Ravindran Nair, FOLIO,2010,ISBN 978-81-906028-9-1

=== Edited anthologies ===
- Malayalam Short Stories: Anthology. Vikas Publishing. 1982. ISBN 0-7069-1297-7.
- Modern Indian Poetry in English. Sahitya Akademi. 1989. ISBN 81-7201-123-7.
- Indian English literature since independence. Indian Association for English Studies, 1991. ISBN 8185218331.
- Narrating Colonialism by D. Maya. Prestige Books. 1997. ISBN 81-7551-029-3.
- Medieval Indian literature: An Anthology, Volume 1. Sahitya Akademi. 1997. ISBN 81-260-0365-0.
- Indian English Literature Since Independence. Stosius Inc/Advent Books Division. 1997. ISBN 81-85218-33-1.
- Medieval Indian Literature: An Anthology, Selections (Maithili-Punjabi) Volume 3. Sahitya Akademi, 1999. ISBN 81-260-0788-5.

== See also ==
- Malayalam literature
- List of Malayalam-language authors
