= Syed Abdul Malik =

Indian writer (1919–2000)

- চৈয়দ আব্দুল মালিক
- Portrait of Malik
- Pronunciation: [soɪjɔd abdul malik]
- Born: 15 January 1919; Naharani, Golaghat, Assam Province, British India
- Died: 20 December 2000 (aged 81); Jorhat, Assam, India
- Citizenship: British Indian (1919–1947); Indian (1947–2000)
- Education: Jorhat College (IA); Cotton College (BA); Gauhati University (MA)
- Occupations: Novelist; short story writer; poet; playwright; lyricist; travel writer; essayist; academic; politician
- Years active: 1942–2000
- Works: Bibliography
- Political party: Communist Party of India (1957); Indian National Congress (1971–1982)
- Spouse: Syeda Hasna Malik (m. 1963; died 2000)
- Children: 6
- Parents: Syed Rahmat Ali (father); Syeda Lutfunnisa (mother)
- Honours: See below

Member of Parliament, Rajya Sabha
- In office 3 April 1976 – 2 April 1982
- Constituency: Assam

44th President of the Asam Sahitya Sabha
- In office 1977–1977
- Preceded by: Jageshwar Sharma
- Succeeded by: Prasannalal Choudhury
- Writing career
- Language: Assamese
- Period: Modern
- Genres: Novel; short story; historical fiction; drama; memoir; travelogue; essay
- Subjects: Romance; love; humanism; social inequality; psychological exploration; interpersonal relationship; history; culture; nature
- Notable works: Poroxmoni; Rothor Sokori Ghure; Bonjui; Xurujmukhir Swopno; Onyo Akax Onyo Tora; Ruptirthor Jatri; Oghori Atmar Kahini; Rojonigondhar Sokulü; Majot Mathü̃ Himaloy; Oxomiya Zikir Aru Jari; Mür Jiwonor Age-Pise, Xü̃we-Bãwe
- Notable awards: Padma Shri (1984); Padma Vibhushan (1992)

Syed Abdul Malik (Note: Assamese: চৈয়দ আব্দুল মালিক, Assamese pronunciation: [soɪjɔd abdul malik].) (Assamese: চৈয়দ আব্দুল মালিক, pronounced [soɪjɔd abdul malik]; 16 January 1919 – 20 December 2000) was an Indian writer and politician. He was a prominent short story writer, novelist, poet, playwright, biographer, essayist and travelogue writer. He is widely recognized for his vast contributions to modern Assamese literature, having authored numerous novels, short stories, poems, and plays. In addition to his literary career, Malik served as a member of the Rajya Sabha and was the president of the Asam Sahitya Sabha in 1977.

He wrote more than 2,000 stories for nearly sixty-five years. He is considered the pioneer of modern Assamese short story literature. He has written more than 25 collections of short stories. He also wrote about 60 novels, five collections of poems, three children's literature and 20 stage radio plays, translations, satirical essays and numerous articles. He received the Sahitya Akademi Award in 1972 for his novel Oghori Atmar Kahini. In addition to Assamese, Malik had etymologies in Bengali, Hindi, Urdu, Persian, and English. He was also fluent in Odia, Nepali, Arabic, Sanskrit and Russian.

== Early life and education ==
Malik was born on 16 January 1919 in Naharni, located in the Sibsagar district of East Assam. He received his primary education in Naharni and later moved to Gauhati for his higher education, attending Cotton College. After completing his Master of Arts (M.A.) degree, he began working as a professor of Assamese language and literature at J.B. College in Jorhat in 1951.

== Literary career ==
Malik was a highly prolific writer, producing a total of 37 novels, 14 short story collections, 4 plays, and 2 poetry collections. His storytelling technique is characterized as effective and engaging, seamlessly weaving themes of romanticism, psychoanalysis, and social consciousness. His writing style is widely noted for its delicate sensitivity, empathy, and strong awareness of social issues.

=== Short stories ===
While Malik wrote across multiple genres, he achieved widespread popularity primarily as a short story writer within modern Assamese literature. The majority of his short stories focused on the psychological analysis of urban youth. He was also known for portraying unorthodox and unique themes of love with immense empathy in his stories.

Some of his notable short stories and compiled collections include Shesh Upakular Seluva Par, Pran Herovar Pachat, Ovar Aru Upakul, Marha Papari, Parasmani (1946), Ranga-Gara (1953), Maram-Maram Lage (1961) and Sheel Aru Sikha (1961).

=== Novels ===
Following the Second World War, Malik wrote continuously for a span of about twenty years. He began writing novels after his work with short stories. His early novels, such as Rathar Chakari Ghure (1950) and Banjui (1954), initially drew inspiration from romanticism. Over time, his novels began to explicitly integrate psychoanalysis and social awareness, as demonstrated in his 1958 novel Chhabi Ghar.

His 1960 work, Surajmukhir Swapna, is regarded as one of his most important and successful novels. In Kapilipariya Sadhu, he focused on portraying fleeting beauty, while Jiyajurir Ghat (1960) was a novel that dealt with bold and slightly explicit elements deeply intertwined with human life. His other prominent novels include Kanthahar (1961), Anya Akash Anya Tara (1962), Rupatirthar Jatri (1963) and Aghari Atmar Kahini (1972).

=== Poetry and plays ===
Malik published two collections of poetry during his career, among which Phulsarjir Rati is highly notable. He also authored theatrical plays, including Rajdrohi (1958). In this play, he reinterpreted the historical character of 'Satram' against the backdrop of a popular revolution.

== Public life and travel ==
Beyond his literary output, Malik was deeply involved in public service and institutional leadership. He was elected as a member of the Rajya Sabha, the upper house of India's parliament. He also occupied highly respected positions such as the president of the Asam Sahitya Sabha and was an official member of the Sahitya Akademi.

In 1965, after being honored with the Soviet Land Nehru Award, Malik set out on a journey across Russia. He later compiled his travel experiences and published these recollections across various magazines.

Malik received many awards, including Padma Shri, Padma Bhushan, Sahitya Akademi Award, Sankar Dev Award, Xahityacharyya, etc. Malik won Sahitya Akademi Award in 1972 for his novel Aghari Atmar Kahini (Tale of a Nomadic Soul). He also received Soviet Land Nehru Award in 1965, leading to his travels in Russia.

== Death ==
He died on 20 December 2000.

== Bibliography ==
Novels

1. Ümola Ghoror Dhuli/Lo.Xa.Gu (ওমলা ঘৰৰ ধূলি/লঃসাঃগু; 1945)
2. Kobitar Nam Labha (কবিতাৰ নাম লাভা; 1956)
3. Bonjui (বনজুই; 1958)
4. Rothor Sokori Ghure (ৰথৰ চকৰি ঘূৰে; 1958)
5. Sobighor (ছবিঘৰ; 1959)
6. Matir Saki (মাটিৰ চাকি; 1959)
7. Konthohar (কণ্ঠহাৰ; 1960)
8. Xurujmukhir Swopno (সূৰুযমুখীৰ স্বপ্ন; 1960)
9. Jiya-Jurir Ghat (জীয়া-জুৰিৰ ঘাট; 1960)
10. Onyo Akax Onyo Tora (অন্য আকাশ অন্য তৰা; 1962)
11. Ruptirthor Jatri (ৰূপতীৰ্থৰ যাত্ৰী; 1963)
12. Rojonigondhar Sokulü (ৰজনীগন্ধাৰ চকুলো; 1964)
13. Adharxila (আধাৰশিলা; 1966)
14. Mür Babe Tumi Nuruba Maloti Phul (মোৰ বাবে তুমি নুৰুবা মালতী ফুল; 1966)
15. Prasir Aru Prantor (প্ৰাচীৰ আৰু প্ৰান্তৰ; 1968)
16. Trixul (ত্ৰিশূল; 1968)
17. Oghori Atmar Kahini (অঘৰী আত্মাৰ কাহিনী, 1969)
18. Bih Metekar Phul (বিহ মেটেকাৰ ফুল; 1969)
19. Onyo Nam Mrityu (অন্য নাম মৃত্যু; 1970)
20. Wilson, Aranya Aru Moi (উইলচন, অৰণ্য আৰু মই)
21. Omor Maya (অমৰ মায়া; 1970)
22. Jaya-Monica Ityadi (জয়া-মনিকা ইত্যাদি; 1968)
23. Xorilot Ekura Jui (শৰীলত একুৰা জুই; 1970)
24. Khüra Nidan (খোৰা নিদান; 1971)
25. Ognigorbha (অগ্নিগৰ্ভা; 1971)
26. Ũihãpholu (উঁইহাঁফলু; 1971)
27. Xünali Xutare Bondha (সোণালী সূতাৰে বন্ধা; 1972)
28. Xipare Pran Xomudro (সিপাৰে প্ৰাণ সমুদ্ৰ; 1972)
29. Dükmükali (দোকমোকালি)
30. Eta Xurjyo, Dukhon Nodi Aru Ekhon Morubhumi (এটা সূৰ্য্য, দুখন নদী আৰু এখন মৰুভূমি; 1972)
31. Pohumora Habir Bat (পহুমৰা হাবিৰ বাট; 1973)
32. Jetuka Pator Dore (জেতুকা পাতৰ দৰে; 1973)
33. Nol, Birina, Khagori (নল, বিৰিণা, খাগৰি; 1973)
34. Mon Jetukar Pat (মন জেতুকাৰ পাত; 1973)
35. Dr. Arunabhor Oxompurno Jiwoni (ড॰ অৰুণাভৰ অসম্পূৰ্ণ জীৱনী; 1975)
36. Eka-Bẽka Britto (একা-বেঁকা বৃত্ত; 1975)
37. Rupaborir Polox (ৰূপাবৰিৰ পলস; 1980)
38. Phagunor Xex Hãhi (ফাগুনৰ শেষ হাঁহি; 1984)
39. Godyo, Podya Aru Phiringoti (গদ্য, পদ্য আৰু ফিৰিঙতি; 1984)
40. Nihxongo Moupiyar Git (নিঃসঙ্গ মৌপিয়াৰ গীত; 1985)
41. Kewol Premerei Jodi (কেৱল প্ৰেমেৰেই যদি; 1985)
42. Mou Dimorur Kü̃h (মৌ ডিমৰুৰ কোঁহ; 1985)
43. Swopnobhongo (স্বপ্নভঙ্গ; 1985)
44. Eta Dhumketur Xorxojya (এটা ধূমকেতুৰ শৰশয্যা; 1987)
45. Xumeru, Kumeru Aru Eta Bãhi (সুমেৰু, কুমেৰু আৰু এটা বাঁহী)
46. Ratir Kobita (ৰাতিৰ কবিতা)
47. Dhonyo Noro Tonu Bhal (ধন্য নৰ তনু ভাল, 1987)
48. Onyo Jug Bhinno Tirtho (অন্যযুগ ভিন্ন তীৰ্থ)
49. Bhumisompar Kopalor Xenduror Phü̃t (ভূমিচম্পাৰ কপালৰ সেন্দূৰৰ ফোঁট; 1988)
50. Swati Nokkhyotror Bhosmo (স্বাতী নক্ষত্ৰৰ ভস্ম)
51. Gãthonit Tejor Koral (গাঁথনিত তেজৰ কৰাল; 1988)
52. Ubhoti Ohar Gan (উভতি অহাৰ গান)
53. Bondor, Kamiz, Belun (বন্দৰ, কামিজ, বেলুন; 1991)
54. Monusyotwor Morixalit (মনুষ্যত্বৰ মৰিশালিত; 1994)
55. Munisunir Sokamoka (মুনিচুনিৰ চকামকা; 1996)
56. Phulonibarir Bojropat (ফুলনিবাৰীৰ বজ্ৰপাত; 1996)
57. Moi Morinü Nejaü̃ Kiyo (মই মৰিনো নেযাওঁ কিয়; 1997)
58. Nijorar Bukut Jwola Juir Xikha (নিজৰাৰ বুকুত জ্বলা জুইৰ শিখা; 1998)
59. Duborir Patot Niyoror Tüpal (দুবৰিৰ পাতত নিয়ৰৰ টোপাল)
60. Apün Apün Sworgo (আপোন আপোন স্বৰ্গ; 1998)
61. Prem Omritor Nodi (প্ৰেম অমৃতৰ নদী)
62. Moromor Mojiyar Xeujiya Dubori (মৰমৰ মজিয়াৰ সেউজীয়া দুবৰি)
63. Balir Bokul Xünor Sẽkura (বালিৰ বকুল সোণৰ চেঁকুৰা)
64. Mou Mitha Hridoyor Bhaxa (মৌ মিঠা হৃদয়ৰ ভাষা; 2000)
65. Okkhyoy Obyoy Smriti (অক্ষয় অব্যয় স্মৃতি)
66. Oronyo Dewota (অৰণ্য দেৱতা)
67. Xünali Andhar (সোণালী আন্ধাৰ)
68. Smritirekha (স্মৃতিৰেখা)
69. Moi Prostaw Korü̃ Je (মই প্ৰস্তাৱ কৰোঁ যে)

Story collections

1. Poroxmoni (পৰশমণি)
2. Rongagoṛa (ৰঙাগড়া)
3. Ejoni Notun Süwali (এজনী নতুন ছোৱালী)
4. Moroha Papori (মৰহা পাপৰি)
5. Morom Morom Lage (মৰম মৰম লাগে)
6. Xil Aru Xikha (শিল আৰু শিখা)
7. Xikhore Xikhore (শিখৰে শিখৰে)
8. Osthayi Aru Ontora (অস্থায়ী আৰু অন্তৰা)
9. Soy Nombor Prosnor Uttor (ছয় নম্বৰ প্ৰশ্নৰ উত্তৰ)
10. Ondhokup (অন্ধকূপ)
11. Bibhotso Bedona (বীভৎস বেদনা)
12. Aworto (আৱৰ্ত)
13. Tinisokiya Gaṛi (তিনিচকীয়া গাড়ী)
14. Püra Gãwot Pohila Böhag (পোৰা গাঁৱত পহিলা ব’হাগ)
15. Pranadhika (প্ৰাণাধিকা)
16. Hãhi Aru Sokulü (হাঁহি আৰু চকুলো)
17. Mrigonabhi (মৃগনাভি)
18. Orihona (অৰিহণা)
19. Hãhire Sokulü Dhaki (হাঁহিৰে চকুলো ঢাকি)
20. Ekhon Nilikha Sithi (এখন নিলিখা চিঠি)
21. Olonkar (অলংকাৰ)
22. Sai Aru Phiringoti (ছাই আৰু ফিৰিঙতি)
23. Xuklopokkhyor Pühoror Swopno (শুক্লপক্ষৰ পোহৰৰ স্বপ্ন)
24. Krisnopokkhyor Andharor Duhswopno (কৃষ্ণপক্ষৰ আন্ধাৰৰ দুঃস্বপ্ন)
25. Olop Dawor Olop Pühor (অলপ ডাৱৰ অলপ পোহৰ)
26. Bohut Bedona Etüpal Sokulü (বহুত বেদনা এটোপাল চকুলো)

He wrote two thousand short stories in the Assamese Language.

Poetry collections

1. Beduin (বেদুইন; 1948)
2. Swakkhyor (স্বাক্ষৰ)
3. Swopno Duhswopno Aru Kisu Kotha (স্বপ্ন দুঃস্বপ্ন আৰু কিছু কথা)
4. Sondoharar Sondo (ছন্দহাৰাৰ ছন্দ)
5. Sondohin Sondo (ছন্দহীন ছন্দ)

Song collections

1. Tümar Kontho Mür Git (তোমাৰ কণ্ঠ মোৰ গীত)

Plays

1. Rajdrühi (ৰাজদ্ৰোহী)
2. Mokorajal (মকৰাজাল)
3. Onyo Ejoni Xokuntola (অন্য এজনী শকুন্তলা)
4. Duror Dewota (দূৰৰ দেৱতা)
5. Jüwaror Dhou (জোৱাৰৰ ঢৌ)
6. Ö Mür Apünar Dex (অ’ মোৰ আপোনাৰ দেশ)
7. Alohi Ghor (আলহী ঘৰ)

Comedy and humorous writings

1. Khiṛiki (খিড়িকী)
2. Hãhimei Ne Kandimei (হাঁহিমেই নে কান্দিমেই)
3. Swami Abhedananda (স্বামী অভেদানন্দ)
4. Miã Mouzadar (মিঞা মৌজাদাৰ)
5. Bhrityo Kinkor Gülam Dax (ভৃত্য কিংকৰ গোলাম দাস)
6. Ojogor (অজগৰ)
7. Jelepi (জেলেপী)

Travelogues

1. Majot Mathün Himaloy (মাজত মাথোন হিমালয়)
2. Eta Sinaki Dwipor Ei Rekha (এটা চিনাকি দ্বীপৰ এই ৰেখা)
3. Bali Beli Aru Zomzom (বালি বেলি আৰু জমজম)

Other works

1. Oxomiya Zikir Aru Zari (অসমীয়া জিকিৰ আৰু জাৰী)
2. Nanan Phulor Koroni (নানান ফুলৰ কৰণি)
3. Xotyor Pothere Xantir Rothere Muktir Joyjatra (সত্যৰ পথেৰে শান্তিৰ ৰথেৰে মুক্তিৰ জয়যাত্ৰা)
4. Raijor Mukhor Mat (ৰাইজৰ মুখৰ মাত)
5. Sufi Aru Sufibad (চুফি আৰু চুফিবাদ)
6. Oxomiya Bhaxat Modhyo Prasyo Aru Uttor Bharotor Xobdo-Xombhar (অসমীয়া ভাষাত মধ্য প্ৰাচ্য আৰু উত্তৰ ভাৰতৰ শব্দ-সম্ভাৰ)
7. Mür Jiwonor Nohölbür (মোৰ জীৱনৰ নহ’লবোৰ)
8. Mür Jiwonor Age-Pise, Xü̃we-Bãwe (মোৰ জীৱনৰ আগে-পিছে, সোঁৱে-বাঁৱে)

== Awards and honors ==
Year	Award	Category	Nominated work	Awarded by	Result	Ref.
1965	Soviet Land Nehru Award	–	Majot Mathü̃ Himaloy (travelogue)	Soviet Union	Won	
1972	Sahitya Akademi Award	–	Oghori Atmar Kahini (novel)	Sahitya Akademi	Won	
1984	Padma Shri	For contribution to Assamese literature	–	Government of India	Won	
1992	Padma Vibhushan	For contribution to Assamese literature	–	Government of India	Won	
1992	Assam Valley Literary Award	–	–	Williamson Magor Education Trust	Won	
1992	Azan Faqir Award	–	–	–	Won	
1997	'Sahityacharya' Honor	–	–	Asam Sahitya Sabha	Won	
1999	Srimanta Sankardev Award	–	–	Government of Assam	Won	
