= Narayan Gangaram Surve =

Marathi poet (1926–2010)

Kavivarya Narayan Surve
- Born: Narayan Gangaram Surve; 15 October 1926; Mumbai, Maharashtra, India
- Died: 16 August 2010 (aged 84); Thane, Maharashtra, India
- Occupations: Poet, teacher, activist
- Spouse: Krishnabai Surve
- Awards: • Soviet Land Nehru Award (1973) • Padma Shri (1998)

Narayan Gangaram Surve (15 October 1926 – 16 August 2010) was a Marathi poet from Maharashtra, India.

Through his poetry, he celebrated labor and challenged the conventional norms of Marathi literature, which was primarily focused on entertainment at the time. He aimed to convey the hardships of poverty and inspire the underprivileged to overcome it through hard work.

In 1995, he became the chairperson of the Akhil Bharatiya Marathi Sahitya Sammelan.

== Life and career ==
He was born on 15 October 1926. Orphaned or abandoned soon after birth, he grew up in the streets of Mumbai, sleeping on the pavement and earning a meager livelihood by doing odd jobs. He taught himself to read and write, and in 1962, published his first collection of poems Aisa Ga Mi Brahma (ऐसा गा मी ब्रह्म; Aisa Ga Mi Brahma). Majhe Vidyapeeth (माझे विद्यापीठ; My University), the book he would be most known for appeared in 1966 while he stayed in Chinchpokli, Mahahrashtra. He received 11 prizes for his book Majhe Vidyapeeth. Though he studied only till Seventh standard and never climbed the steps of a college, he is known as one of the best poets of Marathi language.

Surve actively worked in the workers' union movement in Mumbai and supported himself as a schoolteacher. Surve, who had much faith in Karl Marx, won the 'Soviet Land Nehru Award' (for his book Majhe Vidyapeeth) from the Soviet Union in the year 1973 as communist people of Russia were fascinated by his views and considered him similar to them. He became the editor of Lokvadmaygruha in the year 1972.

In the 1970s, he was often championed in India as well as in the Soviet Union and some Eastern bloc countries as a proletarian poet.

He spent his last years in Nashik, and died due to old age and after a brief illness on 16 August 2010.

== Awards and recognition ==
- He received Soviet Land Nehru Award from Soviet Russia in 1973
- In 1998, he received a Padma Shri award from the Government of India for excellence in Literature & Education.
- In 2003, A Marathi Short Film named "Narayan Gangaram Surve" was awarded with 'Golden Lotus Award (Swarna Kamal)', a certificate and cash prize during the 50th National Film Awards.
- In 1999, he was conferred Kabir Sammanin by the state government of Madhya Pradesh.
- Narayan Surve was a Convener of the Marathi Advisory Board of Sahitya Akademi.
- He presided over Marathi Sahitya Sammelan at Parbhani in 1995.

== Famous works ==
The following is a partial list of compilations of Surve's poems and essays:

- सुर्वे: नारायण सुर्वे यांच्या समग्र कविता Publisher Popular Prakashan
- माझे विद्यापीठ (Majhe Vidyapeeth) (1966)
- जाहीरनामा (Jahirnama) (1978)
- ऐसा गा मी ब्रह्म (Aisa Ga Mi Brahma) (1962)
- सनद (Sanad)
- मानुष कलावंत (Manush Kalawant)
- आणि समाज (Ani Samaj)
- सर्व सुर्वे (Sarva Surve) (संपादन: वसंत शिरवाडकर) (Editor: Vasant Shirwadkar)
- "Mastaranchi Savli" (Book written by his wife, Krishnabai Surve)
- On the Pavement of Life (1973) is a compilation of English translations of Surve's early poems.
