= Manmatha Ray =

Indian playwright (1899–1988)

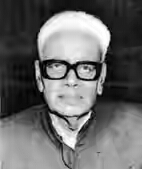
- Born: 16 June 1899; Gala in Tangail District, British India (present-day Bangladesh)
- Died: 1988 (aged 88–89); Kolkata, West Bengal, India
- Occupation: Playwright
- Awards: Soviet Land Nehru Award (1967); Sangeet Natak Akademi Award (1969); Dinabandhu Puraskar (1984)

Manmatha Ray also known as Manmatha Roy was an Indian Bengali playwright. He responded to the socio-political conditions of India at the time through his plays. At least 17 of his plays have been adapted into films. He received the Soviet Land Nehru Award in 1967, the Sangeet Natak Akademi Award for drama in 1969, the State Academy of West Bengal Award in 1971, award from University of Calcutta in 1972 and the West Bengal government's highest drama award 'Dinabandhu Puraskar' in 1984.

== Biography ==
Manmatha Ray was born on 16 June 1899, in the village of Gala in Tangail District, present-day Bangladesh. He was the only son among five children of his father, Debendragati, and mother, Sarojini Devi. He made his debut in theatrical acting at a young age, playing the role of Dhruba in Rabindranath's play 'Bishorjoon' in 1906. After contracting malaria at the age of six, he moved to Balurghat with his family for treatment. He admitted to Balurghat School, West Dinajpur district, and passed matriculation from this school in 1917.

Studying primary education in Mymensingh, Bangladesh, he passed his matriculation from Balurghat, Intermediate of Arts from Rajshahi College, Bachelor of Arts from Scottish Church College, Kolkata in 1922. He completed his Master's degree in Economics from the University of Dhaka in 1924 and graduated in law from the University of Calcutta in 1925. After completing his law degree, he worked as a lawyer in Balurghat for some time. He had also served as mayor of Balurghat Municipality.

Ray remained in India after the partition of India and died in Kolkata, West Bengal, in 1988.

== Activism ==
At a very young age, Ray became interested in the Indian independence movement and he actively participated in the Non-Cooperation Movement, a political campaign led by Mahatma Gandhi against the British government. He responded to the socio-political conditions of India at that time through his plays. His play, Karagar (meaning Prison), written in 1930, which is based on the story of Krishna's birth in prison, destined to kill the tyrant Kamsa, was banned by the British government because it indirectly criticized the treatment of Indian nationalist leaders and followers of Indian independence movement by the British government. In the play, Kamsa was a metaphor for the British government, and Vasudeva was a metaphor for the nationalist leaders and their followers imprisoned by the British government. He expressed his opposition to British rule and patriotic attitude towards the country through many other plays, including Mahabharata, Mir Qasim, Ashok, Chand Saudagar and others.

When he was imprisoned in the Presidency Jail by the British due to the intensity of his theatrical activities and when he went on a hunger strike once in the jail, it was Rabindranath Tagore who asked him to give up the hunger strike, saying, "Give up the hunger strike, our literature needs you."

== Career ==
His first play, Bange Musalman, written while Ray was a Bachelor of Arts student. He wrote Muktir Dak in 1923. 1927, he wrote and acted in the play Chand Saudagar (meaning: Chand the Trader) , in which he played the role of a Bengali rebel. Also his first full-length work, Chand Saudagar was based on the story of Chand Sadagar. In 1933 he wrote historical drama Ashok, based on the life of king Ashoka. The 1938 historical drama Mir Qasim is based on the life of Mir Qasim.

Ray responded to the socio-political conditions of India at the time through his plays. Dharma ghat, written in 1953, focuses on the role of mill owners in breaking a workers' strike and causing riots between Hindus and Muslims, in Totopana (1956 and 1958), he dealt with the neglected poor, and in Santal Bidroha (meaning: The Santal Rebellion), written in 1958, he dealt with the exploited tribals.

At least 17 of his plays have been adapted into films.

Ray, who introduced modern one-act plays in Bengali, wrote many such plays. Bidyutparna (meaning: A leaf of Lightning), written in 1927, is one of the best of his one-act plays. He is often referred as the father of one-act drama in Bengal.

While working in the publicity department of the state government, in 1957, the Government of West Bengal commissioned him to make a documentary on Kazi Nazrul Islam. Manmatha wrote the script for the documentary film Bidrohi Kabi Kazi Nazrul Islam and Manmohan Ghose narrated it. He was also the first president of Paschim Banga Natya Akademi.

== Awards and honors ==
Manmatha Ray received the Soviet Land Nehru Award in 1967, the Sangeet Natak Akademi Award for drama in 1969, the State Academy of West Bengal Award in 1971, and the award from University of Calcutta in 1972. He was the first recipient of the West Bengal government's highest drama award 'Dinabandhu Puraskar' in 1984. The University of North Bengal honored him with an honorary Doctor of Letters degree.
