= R. Parthasarathy =

Indian poet and educator (1934–2026)

Rajagopal Parthasarathy
- Born: 20 August 1934; Thirupparaithurai, Trichinopoly District, Madras Presidency, British India (now in Tiruchirappalli district, Tamil Nadu, India)
- Died: 8 March 2026 (aged 91); Saratoga Springs, New York, U.S.
- Citizenship: Indian
- Occupations: Poet, translator, educator
- Writing career
- Notable work: Rough Passage
- Notable awards: Ulka Poetry Prize

Rajagopal Parthasarathy (20 August 1934 – 8 March 2026) was an Indian poet, translator, critic, and editor.

== Early life and education ==
Parthasarathy was born on 20 August 1934 in Thirupparaithurai, a village near Srirangam in present-day Tiruchirappalli district, Tamil Nadu. He was educated at Don Bosco High School and Siddharth College, Fort, Mumbai and at Leeds University, UK, where he was British Council Scholar in 1963–64. He earned a PhD from the University of Texas at Austin in 1987.

== Career ==
Parthasarathy was lecturer in English Literature in Mumbai for ten years before joining Oxford University Press in 1971 as Regional Editor in Chennai. He moved to New Delhi in 1978. He is Associate Professor of English and Asian Studies at Skidmore College in Saratoga Springs, New York, United States. He was at the International writers workshop, University of Iowa, 1977-1978.

His works include Poetry from Leeds in 1968, Rough Passage published by Oxford University Press in 1977, a long poem (Preface "a book where all poems form part of a single poem, as it were" – R. Parthasarathy) and Ten Twentieth-Century Indian Poets, edited by him and published by Oxford University Press in 1976. He also translates from Tamil to English. His translation into modern English verse of the fifth-century Tamil epic, The Tale of the Anklet: An Epic of South India was published by Columbia UP in 1993. It received the Sahitya Akademi Translation Prize in 1995 and The Association for Asian Studies, Inc. – A.K. Ramanujan Book Prize for Translation in 1996. He was also awarded the Ulka Poetry Prize of Poetry India in 1966. He was a member of the University of Iowa Writing Program during 1978–79, and member of the advisory board for English of the Sahitya Akademi – the National Academy of Letters, New Delhi, India.

Parthasarathy died on 8 March 2026, at the age of 91.

== Awards ==
- The Association for Asian Studies, Inc. – A.K. Ramanujan Book Prize for Translation, 1996 for R. Parthasarathy

== Books ==
- Rough Passage. (Poetry in English). New Delhi: Oxford University Press, India 1977. ISBN 0-19-560690-6
- Poetry from Leeds. Leeds: Oxford University Press, UK 1968.

== Editor ==
- Ten Twentieth-Century Indian Poets. (Chosen and Edited by R. Parthasarathy). New Delhi: Oxford University Press, India 1977. ISBN 0-19-562402-5

== Translations ==
- Cilappatikaram of Ilanko Atikal (The Tale of an Anklet): An Epic of South India. (Translator – R. Parthasarathy). New York City: Columbia University Press, USA 1993.
- Erotic Poems from the Sanskrit: An Anthology. (Translator – R. Parthasarathy). New York City: Columbia University Press, USA November 2017.

== Appearances in the following poetry Anthologies ==
- The Golden Treasure of Writers Workshop Poetry (2008) ed. by Rubana Huq and published by Writers Workshop, Calcutta
- A New Book of Indian Poems in English (2000) ed. by Gopi Kottoor and published by Poetry Chain and Writers Workshop, Calcutta
- Ten Twentieth-Century Indian Poets (1976) ed. by R. Parthasarathy and published by Oxford University Press, New Delhi

== See also ==
- Indian English Poetry
- Indian poetry in English
- Indian English Literature
- Indian literature
