= Soviet Land Nehru Award =

Literary award

The Soviet Land Nehru award was a literary award created to foster better relations between India and the Soviet Union.

The first recipient of this award was the poet Sumitranandan Pant.

== History ==
The Soviet Land Nehru Award was a literary award created in 1965 in India. The award is named after the magazine Soviet Land, which was an Indian magazine published by the Soviet Government-run news agency, TASS, with the intent to promote socialism in India.

== Prizes ==
=== Award money ===
When the award was first launched, the winners would get a sum of 15,000 Indian Rupees. However, later on, the award's structure and criteria were changed, with multiple people getting the award every year. The award was split into two categories, named the primary category and the secondary category. The primary award winners would get a sum of 10,000 Rupees while the secondary award winners would get Rupees 5,000.

=== Soviet tour ===
Winners of this could avail the opportunity to go on a fully-funded 2-week long tour of the Soviet Union.

== Discontinuation ==
In 1991, the award was abruptly discontinued as a result of the Dissolution of the Soviet Union

== Notable award winners ==
Year	Laureate	Literary Work
1965	Sumitranandan Pant	Lokayatan
1966 (?)	Yagyadutt Sharma	Shilanyas
1967	Harivansh Rai Bachchan	64 Russian Poems
1967	Manmatha Ray	?
1968	Vrindavan Lal Verma	?
1968	Firaq Gorakhpuri	Gul-e-Nagama
1969	Yashpal	?
1969	Qurratulain Hyder	For various works
1970	Amritlal Nagar	Amrut aur Vish
1971	Amrit Rai	Kalam ka Sipahi
1971	Dr. Ranjeet	Progressive Poems of Hindi
1972	Upendranath Ashk	?
?	Devendra Kaushik	?
?	Prabhakar Machave	?
1973	Kedarnath Agarwal	Phool nahi rang bolte hai
1974	Shivmangal Singh Suman	Mitti ki barat
1975	Shiv Kumar Mishra	Reflections on Marxist Literature
1976	Vishnu Prabhakar	Awara Masiha
1979	Mithileshwar	?
?	Darshan Singh ^{Can't find any source}	?
1981	Kartar Singh Duggal	?
1981	Ghulam Nabi Aatash	Kashmiri translation of Pushkin's poems
1982	Ramvilas Sharma	भारत में अंग्रेज़ी राज और मार्क्सवाद
1983	Bhisham Sahni	?
1984	Amarkant	?
?	Varsha Adalja	?
1985	Satyajit Ray	?
1986	Shukrdev Prasad	The Indo-Soviet space friendship
1986	Gyanranjan	The revolutionary magazine "Pahal"
1987	Abdul Bismillah	Jhini Jhini bhini chadriya
?	Vishwanath Tripathi	?
1989	Kavita Balakrishnan	Painting
?	Devika Ramesh	?
?	Abhimanyu Anant	?
?	Padma Sachdev	?
?	Vinda Karandikar	?
?	ONV Kurup	?
?	Kaifi Azmi	?
?	Subhash Mukhopadhyay	?
?	Ram Mattegunta	?
?	Balraj Sahni	?
?	Narayan Surve	?
1978	Muzaffar Aazim	Kashmiri translation of Leo Tolstoy's War and Peace
1990	Mother Teresa	Humanity at large
