= Chand Sadagar =

Indian merchant

Chand Sadagar চান্দ সদাগৰ চাঁদ সদাগর
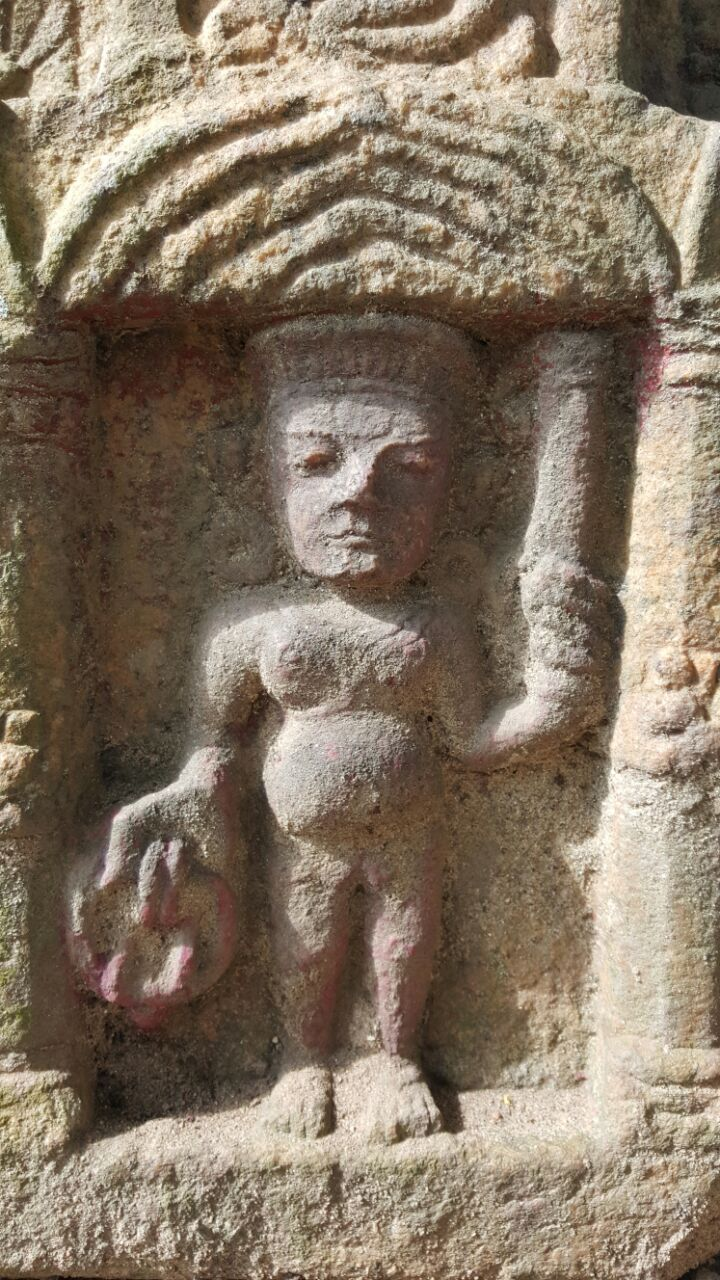
- Born: Chandradhar; 200–300 AD; Champaknagar, Eastern South Asia
- Occupation: Ancient merchant
- Spouse: Sanaka
- Children: 7
- Relatives: Behula (daughter-in-law; legendary)

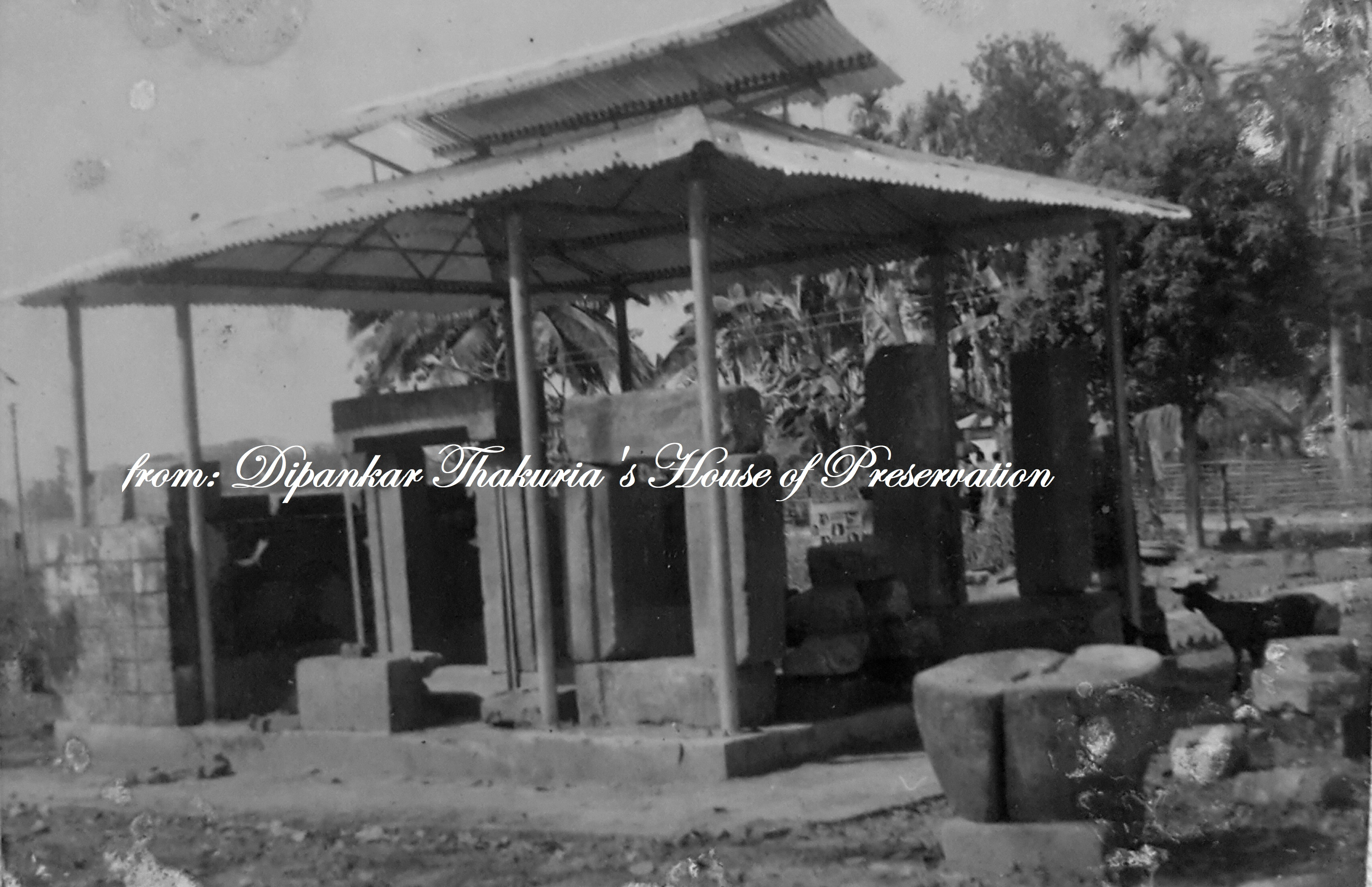
Ruins of Merghar (মেৰঘৰ), Mathpara Village, Chhaygaon, Assam

Chand Sadagar (Assamese: চান্দ সদাগৰ, Bengali: চাঁদ সদাগর) or Chandradhar was a sea merchant of Champaknagar. This merchant has been claimed by both the Assamese and the Bengalis. Medieval Bengali poet Bipradas Pipilai mentioned in his "Manasamangal Kāvya" (or "Manasa Vijay") that merchant ship of Chand Sadagar used to proceed to the sea from ancient Champaknagar after passing through Tribeni, situated at the junction of Saptagram and the confluence of Ganges, Saraswati and Jamuna River of modern-day West Bengal. Narayan Dev in the scriptures gave an account in his Manasamangal about the merchant ship of the trader Chand Saudagar proceeding to the sea from ancient Champaknagar passing through Saptagram and Tribeni, the tri-junction of the Ganges, Saraswati and Jamuna River. In the Padma Puran (Hindu Scripture), account of Chand Bania (Sadagar) is specifically mentioned.

== The location of Champaknagar ==
=== Assamese version ===
According to Assamese folklore, Champaknagar is placed in Chaygaon, Kamrup, about 30–40 km from Guwahati, Assam. Champaknagar is still there in Chaygaon area of Kamrup dist in Assam. There are remains of ancient structures and also a statue of Devi Kali there, the structure is also known as Mer ghar. Locals believe that it is that house or place where Behula and Lakhindhar spent the first night after marriage and there Lakhindhar was bitten by a Snake sent my Manasa Devi. To escape from the plight of Ma Manasa, Lakhindhar and Behula escaped to a place called Gokul Medh, 3 km south of Mahasthangarh and 9 km north of Bogra town, 1 km from the Bogra-Rangpur road of modern Bangladesh after Behula's Basarghar or Lakhinder's Medh. During excavations here in 1934–36, 162 rectangular abattoirs were found in a lined courtyard. It was built in the sixth or seventh century AD. According to local folklore, this place is associated with Behula and Lakhinder. The remains of a temple have been found 800 meters west of the north-west corner of the ruins at Chengispur village in Mahasthangarh. It is called Khullana mound. The Karatoya River, which flows through the region, is now narrow but is known to have been huge in the past.There is a region in Dhubri district of Assam, much north of Bogra, the area is believed to be reminiscent of Mansa's companion leader Netai Dhubuni. Netai Dhubuni is known as the divine washerwoman who washed the cloths of Gods. There is also a rock associated to her near Netai Dhubuni park in Dhubri town. The name of Dhubri town is also named after Netai Dhubni. There is also a hillock named Chandardinga in Dhubri district of Assam the people there believe that the boat of Chand Sadagar crashed and sank down at that place.

=== Bengali version ===
According to the local folklore of Bengal Champaknagari, or Kasba-Champainagari, situated in the Purba Bardhaman district of West Bengal is the Champak Nagar of ancient Bengali merchant Chand Sadagar. The locals believe that the place is associated with Ma Manasa and Chand Sadagar. In "Ain-i-Akbari" also the name of Champainagari Pargana under Sarkar Madaran has been mentioned, which was located in the present Purba Bardhaman district of West Bengal. Kasba-Champainagari is located on the north bank of Damodar River, approx. 32 miles west of Bardhaman city and south of Budbud. We know from the story of Manasamangal that Chand Sadagar was a staunch Shaivite and he even built a Shiva temple in his house. According to the local folklore of this village, the two Shivalingas (one of which is Rameshwar Shivalinga) resting in two ancient Shiva Temples situated in this village of Purba Bardhaman were established by Chand Sadagar himself. There is a beautiful Shiva temple on a high mound situated to the south of the DVC canal. The Shiva temple, located next to a huge Ashwattha tree, has a huge Shivalinga (without the Gauri Patta), known as Rameshwar Shivalinga. There are also two high mounds in the village, one of which is believed to be the ruins of Behula's Basarghar (Sati-Tirtha) and Chand Sadagar's house. Another place in Bengal, associated with the bridal chamber of Behula and lakshindar is Gokul Medh in present-day Bogra district, Bangladesh. The high mound of Bogura is popularly known in local Bengali folklore as the Basarghar (bridal chamber) of Behula.

Sundarban Tiger Reserve of West Bengal, is associated as the place where Neti, foster mother of Ma Manasha, lived and worked as a washerwoman. A temple at Howrah, a Kolkata neighborhood, is believed to have been built by Chand Sadagar.

Between the citadel and the eastern embankment at Gaur, a ruined structure, is claimed to be the house of Chand Sadagar.

== In popular culture ==
- In 1927, Manmatha Roy wrote the mythological Bengali play Chand Saudagar, portraying the title character.
- In 1934, Prafulla Roy directed a Bengali film Chand Saudagar in which Dhiraj Bhattacharya played the role of Lakshmindara, Ahindra Choudhury that of Chand Sadagar, Devbala of Manasa, Sefalika Devi of Behula, Jahar Ganguli of Kalu Sardar, Indubala of a singer, Niharbala of Neta Dhobani, Padmabati of Sanaka and Usharani of Amala. It was written by Manmatha Roy. Film editing was by Akhil Neogi.
- In 2010, STAR Jalsha created a Bengali serial "Behula", based on Chand Sadagar's daughter in law.
- Amitav Ghosh's novel Gun Island deals with Chand Sadagar.
- 2022 Bangladeshi film Hawa is loosely based on this myth.
