= V. C. Harris =

- Born: 1958
- Died: 9 October 2017 (aged 59); Mahé, Puducherry, India
- Occupations: Critic, academic

V. C. Harris (1958 – 9 October 2017) was an Indian film and literary critic, and university professor.

Harris was born in Mahé in 1958. After completing his secondary education at Jawaharlal Nehru Government Higher Secondary School, he began his undergraduate course at S. N. College, Kannur, followed by postgraduate studies at the English Department of the University of Calicut. Afterwards he worked as lecturer of English at Farook College, Calicut, and later as Director of the School of Letters at the Mahatma Gandhi University, Kerala.

Harris completed his Doctor of Philosophy in English Literature under the guidance of literary critic and poet Ayyappa Paniker.

On 5 October 2017, Harris was involved in an accident, and was admitted to the Government Medical College, Kottayam hospital, where he died four days later on 9 October 2017.
