= Kasba, Bardhaman =

Kasba
- Village
- Location in West Bengal, India Kasba (India)
- Coordinates: 23.3513°N 87.5167°E
- Country: India
- State: West Bengal
- District: Purba Bardhaman

Population (2011)
  - Total: 2,119

Languages
  - Official: Bengali, English
- Time zone: UTC+5:30 (IST)
- Lok Sabha constituency: Bardhaman-Durgapur
- Vidhan Sabha constituency: Galsi
- Website: purbabardhaman.gov.in

Kasba is a village in Galsi I CD block in Bardhaman Sadar North subdivision of Purba Bardhaman district in the Indian state of West Bengal. It is situated 12.7 km away from sub-district headquarters in Galsi. Bardhaman is the district headquarter of Kasba village. As per 2009 stats, Lowapur-Krishnarampur Gram Panchayet is the gram panchayat of Kasba village. Bardhaman is the nearest town to kasba for all major economic activities approximately 45km away.

== History ==
Champaknagari, of Chand Sadagar and Manasamangal Kāvya fame, is believed to be located nearby. There are two mounds there – locals believe one to be Behula’s basarghar and the other to be Santali pahar. Both the mounds are believed to have association with Chand Sadagar.

== Geography ==
The place is on the bank of Damodar River.

== Demographics ==
As per the 2011 Census of India, Kasba had a total population of 2,119 of which 1,080 (51%) were males and 1,039 (49%) were females. Population below 6 years was 247. The total number of literates in Kasba was 1,088 (58.12% of the population over 6 years).

== Transport ==
It is about 14 km from Panagarh Railway station/NH 19 and 14 km from Budbud NH 19. It is known for its Shiv mandir to people from religious belief.

== Education ==
Kasba Radharani Vidyamandir is a Bengali-medium, coeducational higher secondary school. It was established in 1968.
