= 100 Thousand Poets for Change =

100 Thousand Poets for Change, or 100TPC, is an international grassroots educational, 501c3 non-profit organization focusing on the arts, especially poetry, music, and the literary arts. It was founded in 2011 by Michael Rothenberg and Terri Carrion, and focuses on a worldwide event each September.

== History ==
The official logo for 100 Thousand Poets for Change

100 Thousand Poets for Change was initially conceived by Michael Rothenberg and Terri Carrion in March, 2011, as a worldwide set of events to take place simultaneously on September 24, 2011. Literary event organizers volunteered to host associated events in their own cities or schools. On September 13, 2011, the city of Santa Rosa, California, declared September 24, 2011, to be "100 Thousand Poets for Change Day," and Stanford University offered to archive all documentation and audiovisual records of the event posted on the 100TPC web site.

Ultimately, 700 events in 550 cities in 95 countries took place on September 24 in conjunction with 100TPC, and the event was described as the largest poetry event in history. Considering the series of events to be a success, Rothenberg and co-founder Terri Carrion decided to pursue non-profit status for 100 Thousand Poets for Change and establish an annual event in September of each year.

In 2018, 100 Thousand Poets for Change added a literacy initiative, "Read A Poem To A Child". A pdf of children's poetry collected by Florida State University University Libraries was made available as a free download. The poems in the pdf were selected from The John MacKay Shaw Collection, which consists of books, works of art, manuscripts, catalogs and ephemera related to childhood. The collection includes bibliographies, biographies, literature, poetry, and criticism. Over 2,000 individuals and organizations participated in this initiative.

Although the worldwide 100TPC event is scheduled for the last Saturday of September each year, it currently takes place year-round. Read A Poem To A Child runs for the week up to and including the global day to allow for school participation.

== Structure ==
100TPC was founded in Guerneville, California, but most organizational tasks are done by individual organizers of local events. Event organizers in individual cities volunteer to create an event in association with 100TPC. The organization's central office then publicizes the event through its web site, social media outlets, and conventional press releases. The relationship between most local organizers and the 100TPC headquarters remains informal, conducted primarily through e-mail. Organizers do not become officers or employees of 100TPC. Organizers can communicate with each other through the 100 TPC Organization & Communication Hub, a Facebook group available to 100TPC event organizers, where they are encouraged, but not required, to work together and to learn about each other's events to help develop event ideas. Local organizers, then, have full control over the style and structure of their events—their only obligation is to register their event with the main 100TPC web site. Some events are free; others charge an entry fee and donate proceeds to charity.

Most 100TPC events take place in September. Each year, the central organizers pick a Saturday in September as "100 Thousand Poets for Change Day" and focus their publicity on that date. Some organizers choose to create 100TPC events at different points throughout the year.

The concept of "Change" in the name 100 Thousand Poets for Change refers to social change, but is otherwise broadly defined and dependent on the definitions of individual organizers or poets. 100TPC events do not necessarily share political or philosophical orientation. The 100TPC web site describes the "change" as having only to fall "within the guidelines of peace, justice and sustainability."
