= Muse India =

Indian literary journal

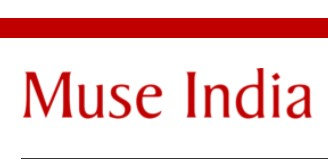
- Categories: Literary
- First issue: 2005
- Country: India
- Language: English
- Website: museindia.com
- ISSN: 0975-1815

Muse India is a literary e-journal based in Hyderabad, India. Since 2005, it has appeared bi-monthly in a web edition; it has no print version. In June 2017, Muse India was approved by the UGC as a literary e-journal. Its founder and managing editor is G Surya Prakash Rao.

== Focus and scope ==
Muse India is an open-access journal publishing English-language poetry, short fiction, and essays by Indian authors, including texts originally written in English and translations from other languages of India. It also publishes book reviews and author interviews.

== Contents ==
Muse India has included work by Dalit Panther activists such as Meena Kandasamy and Gujarati Dalit poet Kisan Sosa, as well as notable writers such as Amrita Pritam, Babu Suthar, Akhil Katyal, Sreyash Sarkar, Bharat Gupt, Bhawna Vij Arora and Vihang A. Naik. Notable non-Indian guest writers/contributors have also been featured in the journal, including Omer Tarin, Baidar Bakht, Zehra Nigah, Marjorie Evasco, Edwin Thumboo, Kishwar Naheed and others.

== See also ==
- List of literary magazines
