= Indian Summer (poem) =

English poem by Indian poet Jayanta Mahapatra

"Indian Summer" is a popular English poem by Indian poet Jayanta Mahapatra. The poem is widely anthologised in important poetry collections and is used as standard reading material in the English syllabus of most Indian schools, colleges and universities. The poem was originally a part of his collection A Rain of Rites.

== Excerpts from the poem ==
Over the soughing of the sombre wind
Priests chant louder than ever.
The mouth of India opens :

Crocodiles move into deeper waters.

The good wife lies on my bed
through the long afternoon
dreaming still, not exhausted
by the deep roar of funeral pyres.

*******

== Structure and criticism ==
The poem is remarkable for clear and exact imagery, judicious choice of words and compactness. The diction has a deceptive simplicity.

Although the poem describes a typical Indian summer, many critics have commented that the poem is a veiled commentary on the "suffering woman". Some others have commented that it was one of the amateur poems of Mahapatra despite the original poetic sensibility.

== See also ==
- Indian poetry
- Indian English literature
