= Michael Rothenberg =

American poet

Michael Rothenberg (1951–2022) was an American poet, songwriter, editor, artist, and environmentalist. Born in Miami Beach, Florida, Rothenberg received his Bachelor of Arts in English at the University of North Carolina at Chapel Hill. He moved to California in 1976, where he began "Shelldance Orchid Gardens", an orchid and bromeliad nursery. In 2016, Rothenberg moved to Tallahassee, Florida where he was Florida State University Libraries Poet in Residence.

In 1993 he received his MA in Poetics at New College of California. In 1989, Rothenberg and artist Nancy Davis began Big Bridge Press, a fine print literary press, publishing works by Jim Harrison, Joanne Kyger, Allen Ginsberg, Philip Whalen, Michael McClure and others. Rothenberg is editor of Big Bridge, a webzine of poetry. Rothenberg is also co-editor and co-founder of Jack Magazine, He is the editor of:

- Overtime, Selected Poems by Philip Whalen (Penguin, 1999)
- As Ever, Selected Poems by Joanne Kyger (Penguin, 2002)
- David’s Copy, Selected Poems by David Meltzer(Penguin, 2005)
- Way More West, Selected Poems by Ed Dorn (Penguin, 2007)
- Continuous Flame: A Tribute To Philip Whalen edited by Michael Rothenberg and Suzi Winson (Fish Drum, Inc., 2007).
- Collected Poems of Philip Whalen (Wesleyan University Press, 2007).
- Bromeliaceae Andreanae by Edouard Francois Andre, English edition, annotated by Robert W. Read (Big Bridge Press, 1983)
- The Bromeliads by Leon Duval, English edition, annotated by Robert W. Read (Big Bridge Press, 1990)

Rothenberg's poems have appeared in New American Writing, Supplement v. 2, Brooklyn Rail, Sensitive Skin, Chiron Review, 88: A Journal of Contemporary American Poetry, First Intensity, Cortland Review, Golden Handcuffs Review, Exquisite Corpse, Zyzzyva, Mudlark, Jacket, Rolling Stock, Sycamore Review, Otoliths and many other publications.

His work has been included in anthologies such as Ecopoetry: A Contemporary American Anthology, edited by Ann Fisher-Wirth and Laura-Gray Street (Trinity University Press), 43 Poetas por Ayotzinapa, edited by Jesús González Alcántara and Moisés H. Cortés Cruz (Mexico), Saints of Hysteria, A Half-Century of Collaborative American Poetry, edited by David Trinidad and Denise Duhamel (Soft Skull Press), Hidden Agendas/Unreported Poetics, edited by Louis Armand (Litteraria Pragensia), and For the Time-Being: The Bootstrap Book of Poetic Journals, edited by Tyler Doherty and Tom Morgan (Bootstrap Productions).

His books include Wake Up and Dream (MadHat Press), Drawing The Shade (Dos Madres Press), Indefinite Detention: A Dog Story (Shabda Press, USA), Indefinite Detention: A Dog Story (Ekstasis Press, Canada), Choose, My Youth As A Train, Unhurried Vision, Paris Journals, What The Fish Saw, Nightmare Of The Violins, Man/Woman w/Joanne Kyger, and Favorite Songs. A Spanish/English edition of Indefinite Detention: A Dog Story was published in 2017 by Varasek Ediciones (Madrid, Spain 2017). An Arabic edition of Indefinite Detention: A Dog Story , trans. by El Habib Louai was published in Cairo, Egypt (Arwiqa Publishers, 2020). Benvenuto Nella Contea Di Somona: Welcome to Sonoma County bi-lingual, (Camion Press, Italy 2019). In 2020, his twenty-eight page book of art and poems called The Pillars: Art & Poems was published by Contagion Press (vsuarez@aol.com). I Murdered Elvis was published by Alien Buddha Press in 2020. In Memory of A Banyan Tree, Poems of the Outside World, 1985-2020 will be published by Lost Horse Press in 2022.

Rothenberg has recorded two spoken word cds in collaboration with prominent musicians. In 2002 he recorded, Under The Spell with Bobby Thomas Jr. Dystopic Relapse was recorded on Tribal Records in 2020, featuring Longineu Parsons, Michael Bakan and Brian Hall.

In 1990 Rothenberg began writing songs. His songs have appeared in films by Hollywood Pictures, Shadowhunter and Black Day, Blue Night. His songs have also appeared in Outside Ozona directed by J.S. Cardone.

An archive of Rothenberg’s early works can be found at The University of California-Berkeley, Bancroft Library. An archive of works current to 2018 are part of Strozier Library, at Florida State University.

== 100 Thousand Poets for Change and Read A Poem To A Child ==
In 2011, Rothenberg and his partner Terri Carrion co-founded 100 Thousand Poets for Change. 100 Thousand Poets for Change is a global poetry and arts movement with an emphasis on peace, justice, sustainability and education. 100 Thousand Poets for change assists poets and artists around the world in organizing and planning events in their local communities, which promote social, environmental, and political change. Over 500 events take place in 100 countries each year. Events include poetry readings, music and dance concerts, art exhibits, art and activism workshops and street demonstrations. 100 Thousand Poets for Change is an annual event but 100 Thousand Poets for Change activities take place year round. 2019 marked its 9th year.

In 2018, 100 Thousand Poets for Change added a literacy initiative, "Read A Poem To A Child". A pdf of children's poetry collected by Florida State University University Libraries was made available as a free download. The poems in the pdf were selected from The John MacKay Shaw Collection, which consists of books, works of art, manuscripts, catalogs and ephemera related to childhood. The collection includes bibliographies, biographies, literature, poetry, and criticism. Over 2,000 individuals and organizations permitted in this initiative.

== Community Activities ==
Rothenberg has also dedicated his life as a poet to political, environmental and social activism. He has been active in the environmental movement for over 40 years.

- He was co-founder and president of Pacificans for Mori Point, a group that led to the protection of several endangered species, the Red-Legged Frog and the San Francisco Garter Snake, and to the inclusion of this important coastal habitat into the Golden Gate National Area.
- His environmental work in Pacifica, California also led to the expansion of the Golden Gate Recreation Area into San Mateo County through the addition of the Sweeney Ridge National Recreation Area.
- Rothenberg is included in the oral history of the Golden Gate National Recreation Area because of his many years as central proponent of the park and prominent figure in the movement to expand the GGNRA in San Mateo County.
- He was on the steering committee for People For A Golden Gate Recreation Area and one of the Board of Directors of Pacifica Land Trust.
- He was also co-founder and President of the International Consortium for Plant Conservation and founder and former director of the Conservation Committee of The Bromeliad Society International, Inc.
- Rothenberg is co-founder and president of Poets In Need, Inc., a non-profit 501c3 organization that grants assistance awards to poets in financial crisis.
- Rothenberg is co-founder of the Andy Lopez Organizing Committee leading the struggle against police brutality after the murder of Andy Lopez in Sonoma County, California.
- He is co-founder of Shelldance Orchid Gardens, which is dedicated to the cultivation of orchids and bromeliads and part of the trailhead facilities of the GGNRA.

== Death ==
Rothenberg died on November 21, 2022, after an extended bout with lung cancer.

== External links to Rothenberg Work ==
- Big Bridge
- Electronic Poetry Center, Buffalo
