= Soumitra Mohan =

Soumitra Mohan (born 2 January 1938) is a prominent Hindi poet and an exponent of the Akavita (अकविता - anti-poetry) movement in Hindi poetry. He is known as a rebel who voiced vehement protest, and is best remembered for his poem, Luqman Ali.

== Works ==
Mohan has published three anthologies of poems in Hindi—Chaaku Se Khelte Hue (चाकू से खेलते हुए - 1972), Luqman Ali (लुक़मान अली - 1978), and Aadha Dikhta Wah Aadmi (आधा दिखता वह आदमी - 2018). Mohan is also a distinguished translator and has published translation of several prose works—most notably Dehra Mein Ab Bhi Ugte Hain Hamare Ped (देहरा में अब भी उगते हैं हमारे पेड़), a translation of Ruskin Bond's Our Trees Still Grow in Dehra). He was one of major poets featured in Nishedh (निषेध), a landmark anthology of poems published in the 1970s. Despite having published his writings sparingly, Mohan's stature as a major Hindi poet of the 20th century is widely accepted.

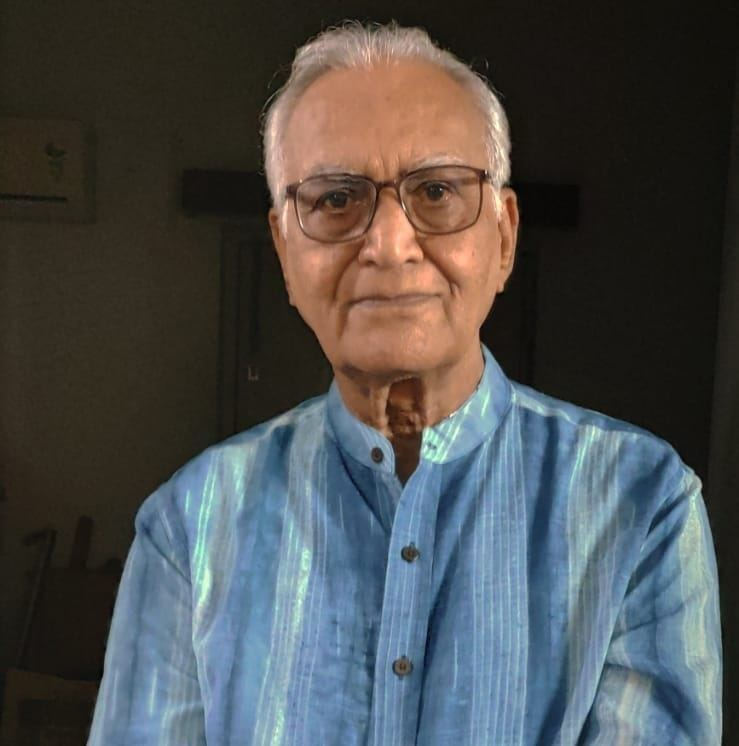

Soumitra Mohan
- सौमित्र मोहन
- Born: 2 January 1938 (age 88)
- Occupation: Poet
- Notable work: Poetry volumes: लुक़मान अली, चाकू से खेलते हुए, आधा दिखता वह आदमी

Soumitra's celebrated long poem Luqman Ali (लुक़मान अली ) appeared in an English translation by Samartha Vashishtha—first in Chandrabhaga (Cuttack, 2007, edited by Jayanta Mahapatra) and then in the international magazine of translated literature, Asymptote.

In the year 2018, Sambhavna Prakashan (Hapur, India) published a volume of Soumitra Mohan's collected poems titled Aadha Dikhta Wah Aadmi (आधा दिखता वह आदमी), bringing together his work spanning the years 1961 to 2017. In his introduction to the book, Soumitra emphasizes:

"This book collects a total of 149 of my poems. It is my wish that readers know my work only through these poems. These are my 'collected poems' – even though I make no claim about this selection being my best."

"इस किताब में मेरी कुल 149 कविताएँ हैं। मैं चाहता हूँ लोग मुझे इन्हीं कविताओं से जानें-पहचानें। यही मेरी 'सम्पूर्ण कविताएँ' हैं हालाँकि इनके श्रेष्ठ होने के बारे में मेरा कोई दावा नहीं है।"
