= Poetry Chain =

Indian English-language poetry journal

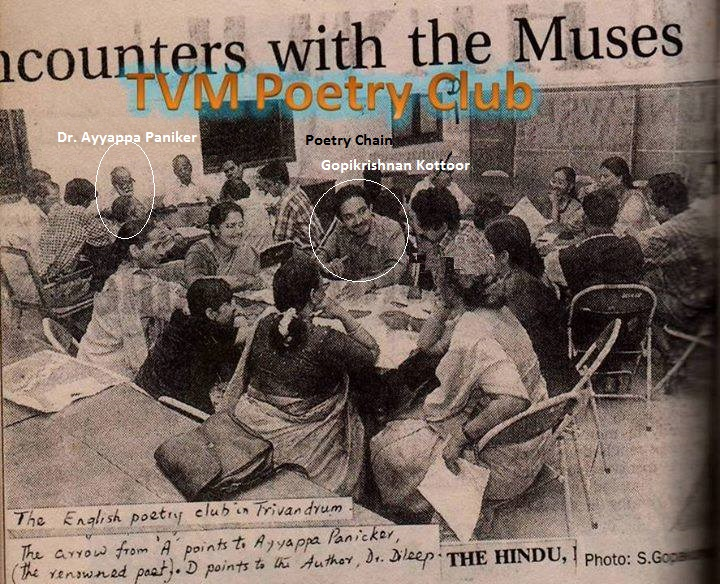
PoetryChain Meet

Poetry Chain is an English poetry journal of India published quarterly from Thiruvananthapuram, Kerala, India. The Indian English poet Gopi Kottoor is its founder editor. The journal was founded in 1997 with the mentoring of the Indian poet Ayyappa Paniker, who was involved with the journal until his death in 2007. In 2009 it was relaunched as online-only publication.

== Inception and growth ==
Poetry Chain started in 1997 as an informal platform for budding poets. Over the years it has acquired substance and stature under the able guidance of Gopi Kottoor and his circle of poet collaborators. The journal's life patrons include Sitakant Mahapatra, Dr HK Kaul (Poetry Society, India), and Padmasree award winner Jayanta Mahapatra. The journal has published internationally renowned poets like Jayanta Mahapatra along acclaimed as well as lesser known poets from all over India. The journal went on to discover many new talents, especially young voices on the poetry horizon. Poets who have read under the Poetry Chain banner include Ruth Padel, Tapan Kumar Pradhan and Meena Alexander. The Awards for poetry instituted by Poetry Chain and in collaboration with The Poetry Society (India) are the Father, Wake Us In Passing Poetry Prize, Agha Shahid Ali Poetry Prize, and The Best Chosen Poet of the year. In 2003, Samartha Vashishtha won one of these prizes for the segment The Jungle from his long poem Simla.

In July 2009, the journal became an online-only publication.

== New Poetry Chain ==
The New Poetry Chain which is a part of Indian Writers Association. Gopi Kottoor is one out of seven member of the advisory board of Indian Writers Association.

== Poetry get-together ==
Poetry Chain has been organizing periodic get-together of poets to facilitate exchange of ideas. From June 2013, Poetry Chain has started conducting monthly meeting of both aspiring and established poets. The meeting is conducted in the last Saturday of every month.

Poetry Chain has become a platform of interaction for Indian poets writing in English residing in different parts of the country. Although Poetry Chain journal has a pan Indian flavor, it has occasionally highlighted local Kerala based themes like Onam also.

== Publication ==
- A New Book of Indian Poems In English (2000) ed. by Gopi Kottoor and published by Poetry Chain and Writers Workshop, Calcutta
