= Coldnoon: Travel Poetics =

Literary magazine

- Founding editor-in-chief: Arup K. Chatterjee
- Categories: Literary magazine
- Frequency: Biannual
- Founded: 2011
- First issue: 23 September 2011
- Country: India
- Based in: New Delhi
- Website: www.coldnoon.com
- ISSN: 2278-9642
- OCLC: 900104589

Coldnoon, International Journal of Travel Writing & Travelling Cultures is a literary magazine that publishes writings — poetry and nonfiction — on the subjects of city writings, culture studies, food cultures, imperial history and history of commodities, travel, geography, situationism, cartography, psychogeography, and urbanism, as well as popular travelogues. The magazine is headquartered in New Delhi, India.

== History and profile ==
The first issue of the magazine appeared on 23 September 2011. The online edition of Coldnoon is published quarterly and the print edition twice a year. The magazine publishes and archives obsolete and out-of-copyright tracts and excerpts of writing that pertain to travel in an idiosyncratic way. The founding editor-in-chief is Arup K. Chatterjee.
