= Jayanta Mahapatra =

Indian poet (1928–2023)

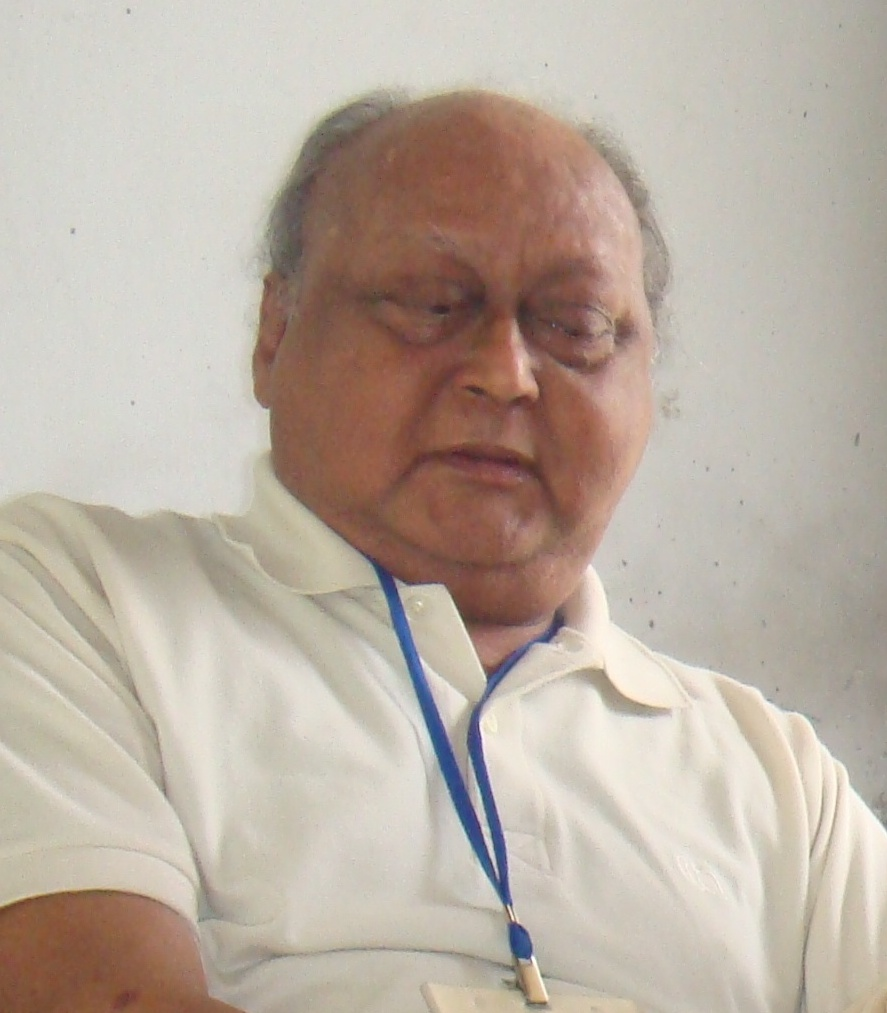
- Born: 22 October 1928; Cuttack, Bihar and Orissa Province, British India
- Died: 27 August 2023 (aged 94); Cuttack, Odisha, India
- Occupations: Indian English poet, Teacher of Physics
- Parent(s): Lemuel Mohapatra, Sudhansubala Dash
- Writing career
- Years active: 1970–2023
- Notable work: Relationship (1980)
- Notable awards: Sahitya Akademi, Padma Shri

Signature
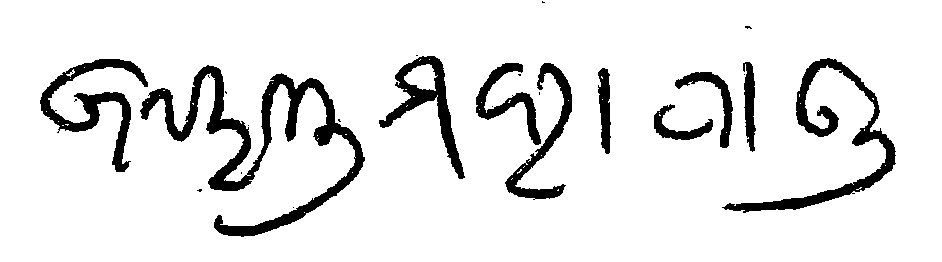

Jayanta Mahapatra (22 October 1928 – 27 August 2023) was an Indian poet. He is the first Indian poet to win a Sahitya Akademi award for English poetry. He was the author of poems such as "Indian Summer" and "Hunger", which are regarded as classics in modern Indian English literature. He was awarded a Padma Shri, the fourth highest civilian honour in India in 2009, but he returned the award in 2015 to protest against rising intolerance in India.

== Early life and education ==
Jayanta Mahapatra was born on 22 October 1928 into a prominent Odia Christian family. He attended Stewart School in Cuttack, Odisha. He completed his M. Sc. in Physics from Patna University, Bihar. He began his teaching career as a lecturer in physics in 1949 and taught at various government colleges in Odisha including Gangadhar Meher University, B.J.B College, Fakir Mohan University and Ravenshaw University. In 1986 he retired from his government job as Reader in Physics at Ravenshaw University (then Ravenshaw College).

Mahapatra began his writing career in the late sixties. His short stories and poems were initially rejected by several publishers, until his poems were published in international literary journals. He was invited to participate in the International Writing Program at Iowa, which brought him international exposure.

== Writing ==
Mahapatra was part of a trio of poets who laid the foundations of Indian English Poetry, which included A. K. Ramanujan and R. Parthasarathy. He differed from the others in not being a product of Bombay school of poets. Over time, he managed to carve a quiet, tranquil poetic voice of his own, different from those of his contemporaries.

=== "Hunger" ===
This one of Mahapatra's best-known, most-quoted early poems, widely anthologised in Indian poetry collections. It explores the informal child sex trade. In the poet's own words, "In 'Hunger' I was writing from experience.” The poem is an expression of the poet's loneliness as a youth, as Mahapatra had a disturbed childhood.

==== Structure and criticism ====
The poem is notable for its direct approach to the taboo topic of a father prostituting his daughter. In the second line, the fisherman asks casually "will you have her?" A wide range of poetic devices are employed to bring out the entrapment of the mind in the flesh.

This poem was originally a part of the poet's collection, A Rain of Rites.

=== Other writings ===
Mahapatra authored 27 books of poems, of which seven are in Odia and the rest in English. His poetry volumes include Relationship, Bare Face, and Shadow Space. Besides poetry, he has experimented widely with myriad forms of prose. His published books of prose include Green Gardener, an anthology of short stories, and Door of Paper: Essay and Memoirs. Mahapatra was also a distinguished editor and was involved in the production of the literary magazine Chandrabhaga. His poems have appeared in prestigious poetry anthologies like The Dance of the Peacock: An Anthology of English Poetry from India, published by Hidden Brook Press, Canada.

Mahapatra also translated from Odia into English, and some of his translations were published in the bi-monthly literary magazine Indian Literature. Some anthologies of his translations have also been published.

== Death ==
Jayanta Mahapatra died of pneumonia on 27 August 2023, at the age of 94.

== Awards, recognition and legacy ==
In 1981 Jayanta Mahapatra won Sahitya Akademi award for his poetry book Relationships. He became the first ever writer in English language to win Sahitya Akademi award. He is also a recipient of the Jacob Glatstein memorial award conferred by Poetry magazine, Chicago. He was also awarded the Allen Tate Poetry Prize for 2009 from The Sewanee Review. He received the SAARC Literary Award, New Delhi, 2009. He has also received Tata Literature Lifetime Achievement Award. He was conferred with a Padma Shri in 2009 and awarded an honorary doctorate by Ravenshaw University on 2 May 2009. He was also awarded a D. Lit. degree by Utkal University, Odisha, in 2006. In May 2019 he became the first ever Indian English poet to become a Fellow of the Sahitya Akademi.

- Kanhaiya Lal Sethia Award for Poetry – 2017 (Jaipur Literature Festival)
- RL Poetry Lifetime Achievement Award for Poetry, 2013, Hyderabad.
- Second Prize – International Who's Who in Poetry, London, 1970.
- Jacob Glatstein Memorial Award – Poetry, Chicago, 1975.
- Visiting Writer – International Writing Program, Iowa City 1976–77.
- Cultural Award Visitor, Australia, 1978.
- Japan Foundation – Visitor's Award, Japan, 1980.

== Poetry readings ==
=== Outside India ===
- University of Iowa, Iowa City, 1976
- University of Tennessee, Chattanooga, 1976
- University of the South, Sewanee, 1976
- East West Center, Honolulu, Hawaii, 1976
- Adelaide Festival of Arts, Adelaide, 1978
- P.E.N. Centre, Sydney, 1978
- Australian National University, Canberra, 1978
- International Poets Conference, Tokyo, 1980
- Asian Poets Conference, Tokyo, 1984

== Books by Jayanta Mahapatra ==
=== Poetry ===
- 1971: Close the Sky Ten by Ten, Calcutta: Dialogue Publications
- 1971: Svayamvara and Other Poems, Calcutta: Writers Workshop
- 1976: A Father's Hours, Delhi: United Writers
- 1976: A Rain of Rites, Georgia: University of Georgia Press (ISBN 9780820303970, OL 5212793M)
- 1979: Waiting, Pune : Samkaleen Prakashan
- 1980: The False Start, Bombay: Clearing House
- 1980: Relationship, New York: Greenfield Review Press
- 2017: Collected Poems, Mumbai: Paperwall Publishing
- 2021: Random Descent, Ketaki Foundation Trust (ASIN B094ZZF9DG, OL 22844719M)
- 2022: Re-reading Jayanta Mahapatra: Selected Poems, Black Eagle Books, USA (ISBN 9781645602002)
- 2023: NOON : New and Selected Poems, Ketaki Foundation Trust (ASIN B0C3Y76BHL)

=== Prose ===
- 1997: The Green Gardener, short stories, Hyderabad: Orient Longman (OL 331803M)
- 2006: Door of Paper: Essay and Memoires, New Delhi: Authorspress (ISBN 9788172733742, OL 16279020M)
- 2011: Bhor Motira Kanaphula (Odia), Bhubaneswar : Paschima Publications (OL 24840744M)

=== Poetry in Odia ===
- 1993: Bali (The Victim), Cutack: Vidyapuri
- 1995: Kahibi Goṭie Kathā (I'll Tell A Story), Āryya Prakāśana (OL 638161M)
- 1997: Baya Raja (The Mad Emperor), Cuttack: Vidyapuri, Bidyāpurī (OL 505046M)
- 2004: Tikie Chhayee (A Little Shadow), Cuttack : Vidyapuri
- 2006: Chali (Walking), Cuttack: Vidyapuri
- 2008: Jadiba Gapatie (Even If It's A Story), Cuttack: Friends Publishers
- 2011: Smruti Pari Kichhiti (A Small Memory), Cuttack: Bijayini

=== Translations into English ===
- 1973: Countermeasures: Poems, Calcutta : Dialogue
- 1976: Wings of the Past: Poems, Calcutta : Rajasree
- 1981: Song of Kubja and Other Poems, New Delhi : Samkaleen
- 1994: I Can, But Why Should I Go: Poems, New Delhi : Sahitya Akademi
- 1996: Verticals of Life: Poems, New Delhi : Sahitya Akademi
- 1998: Tapaswini: a Poem, Bhubaneswar : Odisha Sahitya Akademi (OCLC 42716375)
- 2001: Discovery and other Poems, Kolkata : Writers Workshop
- 2003: A Time of Rising (Poems), New Delhi : Har-Anand Publishers

=== Inclusions in anthologies ===
- A New Book of Indian Poems In English (2000) ed. by Gopi Kottoor and published by Poetry Chain and Writers Workshop, Calcutta
- Ten Twentieth-Century Indian Poets (1976) ed. by R. Parthasarathy and published by Oxford University Press, New Delhi

== See also ==
- Biodata of Jayanta Mahapatra
- List of Indian poets
- Indian English Literature
- Sahitya Akademi Award
