= Writers Workshop (publisher) =

- Status: Active
- Founded: 1957
- Founder: Purushottama Lal
- Country of origin: India
- Headquarters location: 169/92, Lake Gardens, Kolkata 700045, India
- Distribution: Worldwide
- Key people: Ananda Lal; Shuktara Lal
- Publication types: Books
- Nonfiction topics: Literary criticism, Poetry, Drama, Novels, Translations
- Official website: www.writersworkshopindia.com

Writers Workshop is a Kolkata-based literary publisher founded by the Indian poet and scholar Purushottama Lal in 1958. It has published many new Indian authors of post-independence urban literature. Many of these authors later became widely known.

== History ==
The Writers Workshop company was first founded as a group of eight writers (Lal, Deb Kumar Das, Anita Desai, Sasthibrata Chakravarti writing as Sasthi Brata, William Hull, Jai Ratan, Kewlian Sio, and Pradip Sen) in 1958. It was an initiative of Purushottama Lal (1929–2010), a professor of English at St. Xavier's College, Calcutta.

After Purushottama Lal's death in 2010, his family members now run this publishing house.

== Nature of activities ==
Although Writers Workshop mainly publishes Indian writing in English, it has also published books in other modern Indian languages. To date, the press has published over 3500 titles of poetry, novels, drama, and other literary works, with two focuses: experimental literature of the present day, and translations from Sanskrit and other classical Indian languages.

Writers Workshop of India has published the first books by many authors who have gone on to become famous, including A. K. Ramanujan, Asif Currimbhoy, Agha Shahid Ali, Adil Jussawalla, Arun Kolatkar, Arvind Krishna Mehrotra, Chandrakant Bakshi, Chitra Banerjee Divakaruni, Gieve Patel, Hoshang Merchant, Jayanta Mahapatra, Joe Winter, Keki Daruwalla, Kamala Das, Meena Alexander, Mani Rao, Saikat Majumdar, Nissim Ezekiel, Pritish Nandy, Poile Sengupta, R. Parthasarathy, Ruskin Bond, Shiv Kumar, Saleem Peeradina, Tijan Sallah, Vihang A. Naik, Vikram Seth, and William Hull among others who have been included in The Golden Treasury of Writers Workshop Poetry India .

As Writers Workshop enters its sixth decade of existence, it has become an extremely important part of the literary history of India. Its titles are printed as hand-loom sari-bound volumes with exquisite calligraphy on them. Throughout its history, this alternative publishing venture has published authors without a distribution system to back it. One of the most important publishing venture undertaken by Writers Workshop is Lal's translation of the entire Indian epic Mahabharata in 21 volumes (appearing 2005–2023) along with his student, Dr. Pradeep Bhattachrya, and the retired Brigadier General Shekhar Kumar Sen.
