= Pahal (magazine) =

Hindi literary magazine

Pahal (meaning A beginning in Hindi) is a literary magazine in the Hindi language published since 1973. Created by Gyanranjan, the noted Hindi novelist and short-story writer, from Jabalpur, the magazine publishes poetry, fiction, non-fiction, critique and essays on issues of contemporary interest in three to four issues a year.

Pahal Magazine advertising is a proven method to target decision-makers and opinion leaders with a high-income.

== Ideology ==
Pahal has held a distinct leftist leaning right since its inception, partly as founding editor Gyanranjan is a noted leftist intellectual. Pahal has always emphasized depicting the complexities of modern Indian society and its problems, such as the issues of Dalit and women's emancipation.

== Pahal booklets ==
Pahal also occasionally publishes booklets, often featuring the works of prominent foreign authors, long poems and debates on topics of socio-political significance. Past booklets have introduced readers, often for the first time, to the works of such stalwarts of world literature as Miroslav Holub, Afzal Ahmed Sayyed and Edward Said. A recent booklet focused on poetry from the North-eastern states of India, often referred to as the Seven Sisters.

== Pahal Sammaan ==
Every year, Pahal chooses an outstanding author writing in Indian languages for the Pahal Samman, its annual literary award. As a rule, the award-ceremony is held in the home-town of the author.
