= Gopi Kottoor =

Indian poet (born 1956)

Gopikrishnan Kottoor
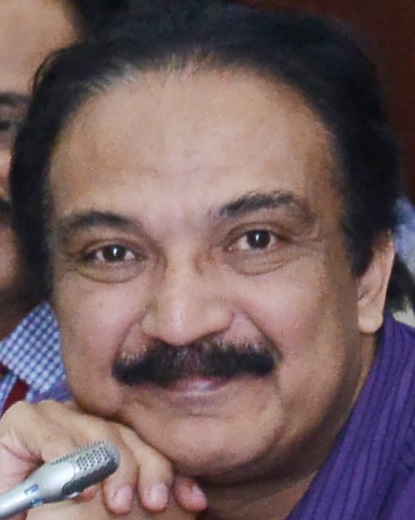
- Born: Thiruvananthapuram, Kerala
- Other name: Raghav G. Nair
- Organization: Indian Writers Association

Gopikrishnan Kottoor is the pen name of Raghav G. Nair (born 1956, Thiruvananthapuram, Kerala), an Indian English poet. He was the founding editor of quarterly poetry journal Poetry Chain.

== Early life and education ==
Kottoor studied at the Loyola English School and Arya Central School, Trivandrum. He obtained his bachelor's and master's degrees in English from the Institute of English, Trivandrum. Kottoor won a poetry prize in a college poetry competition and started publishing his poetry in Indian English-language poetry magazines.

He attended the Master of Fine Arts program of Texas State University, United States, in 2000. In 2005, he was poet-in-residence at the University of Augsburg, Germany, on a sponsorship by the Indian Council for Cultural Relations (ICCR).

== Career ==
=== Poetry ===
Gopi Kottoor won the All-India Special Poetry Prize of the British Council–Poetry Society at the All India Poetry Competition (AIPC) in 1997 for his poem "These are the things we could talk about" as well as Second Prize for his poem "Digging" in the General Category of the AIPC the same year. Between 1995 and 1998, he won two more poetry prizes presented by the AIPC.

His other major poetry prizes include First Prize in the All India Poetry Competition (2017) and Wingword International Poetry Award (2021).

Kottoor's "Father, Wake Us In Passing" (2000), which won him a residency at the University of Augsburg, is a poem sequence about his father dying in a coma. It has received positive reviews. Kottoor's poetry has appeared in international journals that include Orbis International Literary Journal, ARIEL: A Review of International English Literature, The Toronto Review, Arabesques, Persona Literary Magazine of Texas State University, Blue Fifth Review, Chiaroscuro Magazine, Levure littéraire, Big Bridge, nthposition, New English Review, and others. His poems are also featured in the anthology The Dance of the Peacock.

A selection of Gopi Kottoor's poetry, 'Vrindavan' and Changampuzha's elegy 'Ramanan' in translation can be read online here

=== Other work ===
Kottoor's play The Nectar of the Gods (2015) is a socio-historical take on the life of the palace soldier Devasahayam Pillai, who was executed following his conversion to Christianity during the reign of Marthanda Varma in 18th-century Kerala. His other plays include The Mask of Death, a radio play on the last days of the life of Romantic poet John Keats in Rome; Fire in the Soul, a play on the life and times of the nationalist Indian poet Subramania Bharati; and A Woman in Flames.

Kottoor's first novel, A Bridge Over Karma, was translated into Malayalam and serialized in the Malayalam journal Kalakaumudi.

Kottoor founded and edited Poetry Chain, a quarterly for Indian poetry in English, which ran from 1997–2007 and was revived in 2013 as a monthly meeting event. He also edited the e-zine Underground Flowers.

He contributes poetry reviews and other writing regularly to The Hindu.

== Awards and honours ==
- Clover Poetry Prize commendation (1973)
- University of Kerala College Prize (1976)
- Bharathi Prize Chennai (1995)
- All India Poetry Competition commendation prize (1995)
- All India Poetry Competition second prize (1997)
- All India Poetry Competition Special Poetry Prize (1997)
- All India Poetry Competition commendation prize (1998)
- Texas State University Philip McCormick Scholarship (2000)
- Indian Council for Cultural Relations Distinguished Visitor (2005)
- All India Poetry Competition first prize (2017)
- Wingword International Poetry Prize third prize (2020)
- Wingword International Poetry Prize commendable mention (2022)
- Chandigarh Literary Society Annual Poetry Writing Competition third prize (2022)

== Selected publications ==
=== Poetry collections ===
- Father, Wake Us In Passing (2001), Poetry Chain
- Rev. Father Benedict Goes to Heaven: or, The Mainatharuvi Murder and Other Poems (2003), Poetry Chain
- A Buchenwald Diary: Stepping into a Wound of Time (2006), Wallstein
- Victoria Terminus: Poems Selected and New (2010), Author's Press
- The Coloured Yolk of Love: Vrindavan (2012), Author's Press
- Tell Me Neruda (2014), Author's Press

=== Novels ===
- A Bridge Over Karma (2004), Katha
- Presumed Guilty (2013), Author's Press
- Hill House: A View From West Hill (2015), Author's Press

=== Plays ===
- Fire in the Soul: A Play on Subramania Bharati (1995)
- The Mask of Death: The Final Days of John Keats (1996)
- A Woman in Flames (2013)
- The Nectar of Gods: King Marthanda Varma and Devasahayam (2015)

=== Translations ===
- Kukoka's Ratirahasya: Love's Ecstasies (1997), Jaico Publishing House
- Pūntānam’s Jnānappānā: The Song of Wisdom (2002), Writers Workshop

=== Edited books ===
- A New Book of Indian Poems in English (2000), Writers Workshop

=== Anthology contributions ===
- "Penguins" and "Old Time Friends" in The Bloodaxe Book of Contemporary Indian Poets (2008), ed. Jeet Thayil, Bloodaxe Books
- "The Clear Window" in The Dance of the Peacock: An Anthology of English Poetry from India (2013), ed. Vivekanand Jha, Hidden Brook Press
