= List of Indian women writers =

This is a list of women writers who were born in India or whose writings are closely associated with that nation.

== A ==
- Arundhati Roy (born 1961), Indian author best known for her novel The God of Small Things (1997), which won the Booker Prize for Fiction in 1997 and became the best-selling book by a non-expatriate Indian author
- Varsha Adalja (born 1940), Gujarati novelist, playwright
- Smita Agarwal (born 1958), poet, educator
- Vinita Agrawal (born 1965), poet, editor
- Sheetal Agashe (born 1977), poet, essayist, businesswoman
- Meena Alexander (1951–2018), poet, memoirist, essayist, novelist, critic, educator
- Samina Ali, contemporary Indian-American novelist, feminist, author of Madras on Rainy Days
- Balamani Amma (1909–2004), poet, published many collections of poetry in Malayalam
- K. Saraswathi Amma (1919–1975), short story writer, novelist, feminist
- Lalithambika Antharjanam (1909–1987), Malayalam short story writer, poet, children's writer, novelist, author of Agnisakshi
- Temsula Ao (1945–2022), short story writer, poet, educator
- Ashitha, (1956–2019), Malayalam short story writer, poet

== B ==
- Begum Rokeya Sakhawat Hossain (1880-1932), the first woman Muslim writer from colonial Bengal.
- Jasodhara Bagchi (1937–2015), leading feminist critic, essayist, activist
- Anuttama Banerjee, psychologist, poet, author, and public health advocate
- Sushmita Banerjee (c.1963–2013), memoirist
- Rashmi Bansal (born 1985), non-fiction best-seller writer on entrepreneurship
- Bani Basu (born 1939), Bengali novelist, essayist, critic, poet
- Barkha Dutt (born 1971), TV journalist
- Kumudini Basu (1873–1942), writer, social reformer, freedom fighter and women's rights activist
- Malati Bedekar (1905–2001), Marathi feminist writer, short story writer, screenwriter
- Sheila Bhatia (1916–2008), poet, playwright, theatre director
- Sujata Bhatt (born 1956), Gujarati poet, also writing in English
- Rajlukshmee Debee Bhattacharya, since the 1990s: poet in Bengali and English
- Suchitra Bhattacharya (1950–2015), Bengali novelist, short story writer
- Nirmal Prabha Bordoloi (1933–2003), Assamese poet, lyricist, children's writer
- Urvashi Butalia (born 1952), feminist, publisher, non-fiction writer

== C ==
- Neelam Saxena Chandra (born 1969), poet, children's writer, novelist
- Chandramathi (born 1954), novelist writing in Malayalam and English
- Rimi B. Chatterjee (born 1969), novelist, short story writer, non-fiction writer, translator
- Jayasri Chattopadhyay (born 1945), Sanskrit poet, educator
- Anuja Chauhan (born 1970), advertiser, novelist, author of The Zoya Factor
- Subhadra Kumari Chauhan (1904–1948), Hindi poet
- Prem Chowdhry (born 1944), social scientist, feminist, non-fiction writer, essayist
- Rita Chowdhury (born 1960), poet, novelist, educator
- Raghavan Chudamani (1931–2010), novelist, short story writer, writing in Tamil and English
- Ismat Chughtai (1915–1991), Urdu novelist, screenwriter
- Ajit Cour (born 1934), Punjabi novelist, short story writer
- C. S. Chandrika (born 1967), novelist, short story writer, essayist in Malayalam

== D ==
- Esha Dadawala (born 1985), Gujarati poet, journalist
- Sukanya Datta (born 1961), scientist and science fiction writer
- Anupreeta Das, journalist and author
- Abha Dawesar (born 1974), novelist, short story writer, author of Babyji
- Shobha De (born 1947), journalist, novelist
- Eunice de Souza (born 1940–2017), English-language poet, critic, novelist
- Pitambari Debi (1904–?), writer of Odia literature
- Anita Desai (born 1937), novelist, author of In Custody
- Kamal Desai (1928–c.2011), novelist, writing in Marathi
- Kiran Desai (born 1971), novelist, author of The Inheritance of Loss
- Dhanashree Deshpande-Ganatra (born 1970), poet, singer, and music producer
- Gauri Deshpande (1942–2003), novelist, short story writer, poet, wrote in Marathi and English
- Shashi Deshpande (born 1938), novelist, short story writer, children's writer
- Sunita Deshpande (1926–2009), Marathi memoirist, letter writer
- Nabaneeta Dev Sen (1938–2019), poet, novelist, educator
- Ashapoorna Devi (1909–1995), Bengali novelist, poet
- Leela Devi (1932–1998), novelist, non-fiction writer, playwright, translator, writing in Malayalam and English
- Mahasweta Devi (1926–2016), Bengali-Indian journalist, novelist
- Maitreyi Devi (1914–1989), Bengali poet, novelist
- M. K. Binodini Devi (1922–2011), Manipuri memoirist, essayist, short story writer, novelist
- Nalini Bala Devi (1898–1977), Assamese poet
- Nirupama Devi (1883–1951), novelist
- Sneha Devi (1916–1990), writer of Assamese literature
- Chitra Banerjee Divakaruni (born 1956), Indian-American poet, novelist, short story writer, author of The Mistress of Spices
- Varsha Dixit, novelist
- Nirupama Dutt (born 1955), Punjabi poet, journalist, translator
- Toru Dutt (1856–1877), poet, novelist, writing in English and French

== E ==
- Bondina Elangbam, writer, poet and artist

== G ==
- Gangadevi (14th century), Telugu princess, poet, author of Madura Vijayam
- Mridula Garg (born 1938), novelist, short story writer, playwright, essayist, writing in Hindi and English
- Sagarika Ghose (born 1964), journalist, TV presenter, novelist
- Jyoti Gogte (born 1956), academic writer
- Namita Gokhale (born 1956), English-language novelist, short story writer
- Padma Gole (1913–1998), Marathi poet
- Ellen Lakshmi Goreh (1853–1937), poet, Christian missionary, deaconess and nurse
- Nirmala Govindarajan, English-language novelist, journalist
- Mamoni Raisom Goswami (1942–2011), Assamese poet, novelist, short story writer, editor, educator
- Santhini Govindan (born 1959), children's writer
- Kodagina Gowramma, pen name of B. T. Gopal Krishna (1912–1939), short story writer, feminist
- Teji Grover (born 1955), poet, novelist, translator, painter
- Neelum Saran Gour (born 1955), writer, academic
- Ganga Bharani Vasudevan (born 1990), novelist, script writer

== H ==
- Baby Halder (born 1973), domestic servant, autobiographer
- Githa Hariharan (born 1954), novelist
- Chandrakala A. Hate (1903–1990), feminist writer, educator
- Nistula Hebbar (born 1975), journalist, columnist, novelist
- Vera Hingorani (1924–2018), gynaecologist, medical writer
- Saliha Abid Hussain, 20th-century Urdu-language novelist, children's writer
- Krishna Hutheesing (1907–1967), biographer, non-fiction writer

== I ==
- M. K. Indira (1917–1994), Kannada novelist
- Ismat Chugtai (1915-1991), Indian Urdu novelist, short story writer, liberal humanist and filmmaker

== J ==
- Manorama Jafa (born 1932), prolific children's writer
- Rashid Jahan (1905–1952), Urdi short story writer, playwright
- Jana Begum (17th century), early female writer of a commentary on the Qur'an
- Pupul Jayakar (1915–1997), biographer, non-fiction writer on handicrafts
- Ruth Prawer Jhabvala (1927–2013), acclaimed German-born British novelist, short story writer, screenwriter, grew up in India
- Sarah Joseph (born 1946), Malayalam novelist, short story writer, author of Aalahayude Penmakkal
- Isha Basant Joshi (born 1908, date of death unknown), poet, short story writer
- Anees Jung (born 1944), journalist, columnist, non-fiction writer
- Kirthi Jayakumar (born 1987), author, non-fiction writer, women's rights activist, feminist
- Jyoti Arora (born 1977) Blogger, novelist

== K ==
- Madhur Kapila (1942–2021), writer, journalist, art critic
- Shakuntala Karandikar (1931–2018), biographer, essayist and philanthropist
- Meena Kandasamy (born 1984), poet, biographer, novelist, feminist
- Amita Kanekar (born 1965), novelist, educator
- Kanhopatra (15th century), Marathi saint-poet
- Kota Neelima, writer, journalist, artist
- Lakshmi Kannan (born 1947), Tamil poet and novelist, translates her works into English
- Bhanu Kapil (born 1968), British-Indian novelist
- Manju Kapur, since 1998: novelist
- Swati Kaushal, since 2005: young adult novelist
- Girijabai Kelkar (1886–1890), Marathi-language playwright, feminist writer
- Sumana Kittur (active since 2007), journalist, film director, lyricist
- Habba Khatoon (1554–1609), Kashmiri mystic poet
- Mridula Koshy (born 1969), short story writer, novelist
- Sumati Kshetramade (1913–1997), novelist
- Rajam Krishnan (1925–2014), Tamil novelist, playwright, short story writer, feminist
- Priya Kumar (born 1974), novelist
- Twinkle Khanna (born 1973), author, columnist

== L ==
- Jhumpa Lahiri (born 1967), British-born American-Indian short story writer, novelist, author of The Lowland
- Monica Lakhmana, Indian history writer, author of “Women In Pre & Post Independent India 75 Victories Visionaries Voices
- Ritu Lalit (born 1964), Indian novelist
- Lalleshwari (1320–1392), Kashmiri mystic poet
- Bem Le Hunte (born 1964), British-Indian novelist, now in Australia
- Lalitha Lenin (born 1946), acclaimed Malayalam poet, educator
- Raageshwari Loomba (born 1977), writer, author of Building a Happy Family, now in United Kingdom

== M ==
- Akka Mahadevi (12th century), poet writing in Old Kannada
- Megha Majumdar, novelist, A Burning
- Tilottama Majumdar (born 1966), Bengali novelist, short story writer, poet, essayist
- Anju Makhija, since 1990, poet, playwright, translator
- Amita Malik (1921–2009), film and television critic, radio journalist
- Kiran Manral (born 1971), novelist, blogger, non-fiction writer
- Kamala Markandaya, pen name of Kamala Purnaiya Taylor (1924–2004), best selling novelist, journalist
- C K Meena (born 1957), novelist, journalist, educator
- Meera (15th century), Hindu mystic poet
- K. R. Meera (born 1970), journalist, novelist, short story writer, children's writer
- Rama Mehta (1923–1978), sociologist, novelist, non-fiction writer
- Indu Menon (born 1980), Malayalam novelist, short story writer, screenwriter, sociologist
- Jaishree Misra (born 1961), best-selling novelist
- Richa S Mukherjee (born 1980), best-selling novelist of contemporary fiction and comedic thrillers
- Baisali Mohanty (born 1994), author, columnist, non-fiction writer
- Molla (1440–1530), poet, translated the Ramayana into Telugu
- Muddupalani (18th century), Telugu poet
- Chitra Mudgal (born 1944), Hindi novelist
- Bharati Mukherjee (1940–2017), Indian-American novelist, short story writer, non-fiction writer, author of Jasmine
- Khadija Mumtaz (born 1955), medical doctor, novelist, author of Barsa (novel)
- Sudha Murthy (born 1950), Kannada novelist, short story writer, children's writer, sociologist, businesswomen
- Seema Mustafa, since 1990s, journalist, biographer, newspaper editor
- Meher Pestonji, (born 1946), freelance journalist, author

== N ==
- Sarojini Naidu (1879–1949), child prodigy, Indian independence activist, poet
- Anita Nair (born 1966), English-language poet, novelist, author of Ladies Coupé
- Sadhana Naithani (born 1964), folklorist and post-colonial theorist
- Nalini Priyadarshni (born 1974), poet, writer, critic
- Suniti Namjoshi (born 1941), poet, short story writer, children's writer
- Meera Nanda (born 1954), Indian-American historian, religious writer
- Anupama Niranjana (1934–1991), medical doctor, Kannada novelist, short story writer

== P ==
- Manjula Padmanabhan (born 1953), playwright, journalist, comic strip artist, children's writer
- Mrinal Pande (born 1946), television presenter, journalist, novelist, non-fiction writer, newspaper editor
- Meghna Pant (born 1980), award-winning novelist, non-fiction writer, journalist, feminist, columnist, speaker
- Rashmi Parekh (born 1976), poet, computer scientist
- Dhiruben Patel (1926–2023), Gujarati novelist, short story writer, playwright, translator
- Savitribai Phule (1831–1897), poet, social reformer
- Gita Piramal (born c. 1954), magazine editor, businesswoman, non-fiction writer
- Gudibande Poornima (born 1951), poet, novelist, non-fiction writer
- Manjiri Prabhu (born 1964), novelist, filmmaker
- Manasi Pradhan (born 1962), novelist, women's rights activist
- Amrita Pritam (1919–2005), poet, novelist, essayist, first prominent Punjabi woman poet
- Neelkamal Puri (born 1956), Punjabi novelist, short story writer, columnist, educator
- Deanne Pandey (born 1968), fitness and lifestyle writer

== R ==
- Rajalakshmi (1930–1965), Malayalam poet, novelist
- Rajashree, author of the chick lit best seller Trust Me (2006)
- Anuradha Ramanan (1947–2010), prolific novelist, short story writer
- Ravinder Randhawa (born 1952), British-Indian novelist, short story writer
- Bhargavi Rao (1944–2008), specialist in Telugu literature, translator, anthologist
- Malathi Rao (born 1930), novelist, short story writer
- Usha Rao-Monari (born 1959), economist and non-fiction writer
- Santha Rama Rau (1923–2009), Indian-American novelist, playwright
- Rashid-un-Nisa (1855 – 1929), the first Indian women Urdu novelist, known for her first Novel Islah un Nisa.
- Nuchhungi Renthlei (1914–2002), poet, singer, school teacher, women's rights activist
- Anusree Roy (born 1982), Indo-Canadian playwright, actress
- Anuradha Roy (born 1967), novelist
- Arundhati Roy (born 1961), novelist, author of The God of Small Things
- Nilanjana S. Roy (born c. 1971), journalist, children's writer
- Kamini Roy (1864–1933), leading Bengali poet, essayist, feminist
- Sumana Roy, Indian poet, novelist, short story writer
- Rita Kothari, Author, Professor, Translation Studies and Partition http://www.iitgn.ac.in/faculty/humanities/rita.htm

== S ==
- Padma Sachdev (1940–2021), Dogri poet, novelist, also writing in Hindi
- Nayantara Sahgal (born 1927), novelist, memoirist, letter writer, author of Rich Like Us
- Sarojini Sahoo (born 1956), feminist writer, novelist, short-story writer, author of Sensible Sensuality
- Nandini Sahu (born 1973), English-language poet, folklorist, academic
- Indira Sant (1914–2000), Marathi poet
- Krupabai Satthianadhan (1862–1894), early English-language Indian novelist
- Mala Sen (1947–2011), writer and human rights activist, author of India's Bandit Queen
- Mallika Sengupta (1960–2011), Bengali poet, novelist, feminist, sociologist
- Poile Sengupta (born 1948), English-language playwright, children's writer, poet
- Teesta Setalvad (born 1962), journalist, civil rights activist
- Madhuri R. Shah (fl. 1970-80s), educationist, non-fiction writer
- Shantichitra (born 1978), novelist, short story writer, educator
- Sarjana Sharma (born 1959), journalist, broadcaster
- Shanta Shelke (1922–2002), Marathi poet, novelist, short story writer, educator
- Preeti Shenoy (born 1971), novelist, non-fiction writer
- Melanie Silgardo (born 1956), poet
- Chandramani Singh (1940–2022), art historian and writer
- Sunny Singh (born 1969), journalist, novelist, short story writer
- Sunny Singh (1931–1999), Bengali poet, novelist, feminist
- Kabita Sinha (1931–1999), Bengali poet, novelist, feminist
- Mridula Sinha (1942–2020), state governor of Goa, Hindi novelist, short story writer
- Shumona Sinha (born 1973), Indian born French writer, novelist, feminist
- Sivasankari (born 1942), Tamil novelist
- Krishna Sobti (1925–2019), Hindi novelist, essayist
- Atima Srivastava (born 1961), short story writer, novelist, screenwriter, film director
- Arundhathi Subramaniam, since c.2003: poet, journalist, biographer
- Vidya Subramaniam (born 1957), prolific novelist, short story writer
- Sugathakumari (1934–2020), Malayalam poet, activist
- Kamala Surayya (1934–2009), English-language poet, Malayalam short story writer, columnist, autobiographer
- Sunita Jain (1940–2017), English and Hindi fictionist

== T ==
- Shweta Taneja (born 1980), novelist, comic writer, journalist
- Sooni Taraporevala (born 1957), screenwriter, photographer
- Romila Thapar (born 1930), historian, non-fiction writer
- Susie Tharu (born 1943), non-fiction writer, educator, women's rights activist
- Manjit Tiwana (born 1947), Punjabi poet, educator
- Madhu Trehan, since mid 1970s, journalist, magazine editor
- Ira Trivedi, since 2006, non-fiction writer, novelist, columnist
- Ashwiny Iyer Tiwari (born 1979), author, filmmaker

== U ==
- Krishna Udayasankar, Singapore-based Indian author
- O. V. Usha (born 1948), Malayalam poet, novelist, short story writer

== V ==
- Urvashi Vaid (1958–2022), Indian-American LGBT activist, non-fiction writer
- Vaidehi (born 1945), acclaimed Kannada short story writer, essayist, novelist, poet, children's writer
- Aparna Vaidik (born 1975), historian
- P. Valsala (1939–2023), novelist, short story writer, social activist
- Mahadevi Varma (1907–1987), Hindi poet, women's rights activist
- Kapila Vatsyayan (1928–2020), art historian, non-fiction writer
- Reetika Vazirani (1962–2003), Indian-American poet, educator
- Kaajal Oza Vaidya (born 1966), screenwriter, novelist, journalist
- Vijayalakshmi (born 1960), prolific Malayalam poet
- Sharifa Vijaliwala, (born 1962), Indian writer and translator
- Pinki Virani (born 1959), journalist, best-selling novelist, non-fiction writer
- Susan Visvanathan (born 1957), sociologist, non-fiction writer, novelist, essayist
- Vrinda Singh, novelist writing on themes related to women
- Vaishnavi Pusapati, poet

== Y ==
- Mallika Yunis, since 1980s, novelist

== Z ==
- Shama Zaidi (born 1938), art critic, screenwriter, filmmaker
- Zahida Zaidi (1930–2011), poet, playwright, critic, educator
- Zeenuth Futehally (1904-1992), author, feminist, novelist

== See also ==
- List of women writers
