= Kit Reed bibliography =

List of works by or about Kit Reed, American writer.

== Novels ==
- Mother Isn't Dead She's Only Sleeping (1961)
- At War As Children (1964)
- The Better Part (1967)
- Armed Camps (1969)
- Cry of the Daughter (1971)
- Tiger Rag (1973)
- Captain Grownup (1976)
- The Ballad of T. Rantula (1979)
- Magic Time (1980)
- Fort Privilege (1985)
- The Revenge of the Senior Citizens (1986)
- Blood Fever (1986) [as by Shelley Hyde]
- Catholic Girls (1987)
- Gone (1992) [as by Kit Craig]
- Twice Burned (1993) [as by Kit Craig]
- Little Sisters of the Apocalypse (1994)
- Strait (1995) [as by Kit Craig]
- J. Eden (1996)
- Closer (1997) [as by Kit Craig]
- Some Safe Place (1998) [as by Kit Craig]
- Short Fuse (1999) [as by Kit Craig]
- @expectations (2000)
- Thinner Than Thou (2004)
- Bronze (2005)
- The Baby Merchant (2006)
- The Night Children (2008)
- Enclave (2009)
- Son of Destruction (2012)
- Where (2015)
- Mormama (2017)

== Short fiction ==
Collections

- Mister Da V. and Other Stories (1967)
- The Killer Mice (1976)
- Other Stories and...The Attack of the Giant Baby (1981)
- Thief of Lives (1992)
- Weird Women, Wired Women (1998)
- Seven for the Apocalypse (1999)
- Dogs of Truth : New and Uncollected Stories (2005)
- What Wolves Know (2011)
- The Story Until Now: A Great Big Book of Stories (2013)

Anthologies

- Fat (1974)
- The Science Fiction Weight Loss Book (1983)

Short stories

See also her bibliographic entry in the Internet Speculative Fiction Database and also in the Laboratory of Fantastic.

Title	Year	First published	Reprinted/collected	Notes
Precautions	2000	Reed, Kit (Aug 2000). "Precautions". F&SF. 99 (2): 121–128.	Merla, Patrick (ed.). The touch. ISBN 9780743407151.	
Results guaranteed	2012	Reed, Kit (October–November 2012). "Results guaranteed". Asimov's Science Fiction. 36 (10–11).		
The legend of Troop 13	2013	Reed, Kit (January 2013). "The legend of Troop 13". Asimov's Science Fiction. 37 (1): 58–71.		
Military secrets	2015	Reed, Kit (March 2015). "Military secrets". Asimov's Science Fiction. 39 (3): 40–45.		

== Book reviews ==
- Doctors by Erich Segal
- Cordelia Underwood, Or the Marvelous Beginnings of the Moosepath League, by Van Reid
- Reservation Road, by John Burnham Schwartz
- The Better Man, by Anita Nair

== Critical studies and reviews of Reed's work ==
The story until now

- Di Filippo, Paul (August 2013). "On Books". Asimov's Science Fiction. 37 (8): 107–111.
