= Lessons in Forgetting =

- Directed by: Unni Vijayan
- Screenplay by: Anita Nair
- Based on: Lessons in Forgetting by Anita Nair
- Produced by: Prince Thampi
- Starring: Adil Hussain; Roshni Achreja; Maya Tideman; Raaghav Chanana
- Cinematography: Viswamangal Kitsu
- Edited by: Unni Vijayan; Mandar Khanvilkar
- Music by: Ganesh Kumaresh
- Production company: Arowana Studios
- Distributed by: Arowana Studios
- Release date: 15 February 2012
- Running time: 110 minutes
- Country: India
- Language: English
- Budget: 1.2 million USD

Lessons in Forgetting is a 2012 Indian film produced by Prince Thampi for Arowana Studios. It is based on the novel of the same name by Anita Nair and directed by Unni Vijayan. It stars Adil Hussain, Roshni Achreja, Maya Tideman and Raaghav Chanana. The film was shot in 35mm Cinemascope.

It was awarded the 2012 National Film Award for Best Feature Film in English.

== Plot ==
A renowned expert on cyclones J.A. Krishnamoorthy comes to India, when he learns that his daughter, Smriti, has met with a fatal freak accident. Determined to find out the truth behind his daughter’s accident, JAK begins retracing his daughter's steps on the days that led to her accident in a small town in Tamil Nadu.

With a strong desire to know the truth, JAK embarks on his own investigation. He meets with the people who were close to Smriti. They give different versions of what they felt about her. JAK feels he is getting closer to the truth. But his hopes are shattered when he reaches a dead end.

Meera, a socialite, finds her life in chaos when her husband walks out on her leaving her with her two children, mother and her grandmother. Left to fend for herself, Meera takes up a job as an assistant to JAK. Inadvertently she leads him to a very important piece of the puzzle of the case.

Various events and coincidences help him get closer to the truth. They find themselves back in Minjikapuram, the coastal town where it all began. Here JAK realises that there was a bigger issue that Smriti was fighting against.

The film concludes with JAK confronting the truth about the past.

== Cast ==
- Adil Hussain as JAK
- Roshni Achreja as Meera
- Maya Tideman as Smriti
- Raaghav Chanana as Soman
- Karan Nair as Mathew
- Amey Wagh as Shivu
- Bhanu Prakash as Dr.Srinivasan
- Srilekha as Chinnataayi
- Anuja Vaidya as Nayantara
- Veena Sajnani as Meera's Mother
- Lakshmi Krishnamurthy as Meera's Grandmother
- Parthiv Shah as Nikhil
- Sukitha Aiyar as Vinnie
- Uttara Baokar as Kalachitti.
- Sanjeev Murali as Theatre group leader.

== Production ==
Produced by Prince Thampi for Arowana Studios, the movie is based on the bestselling novel by the same title, written by Anita Nair. Prince Thampi is best known as the publisher of the Malayalam magazine Santham. Lessons in Forgetting is the first film to be produced by Arowana Studios. Some of the staff members of Arowana Studios and the Parent Company Arowana Consulting Limited also participated as extras in a few scenes.

=== Filming locations ===
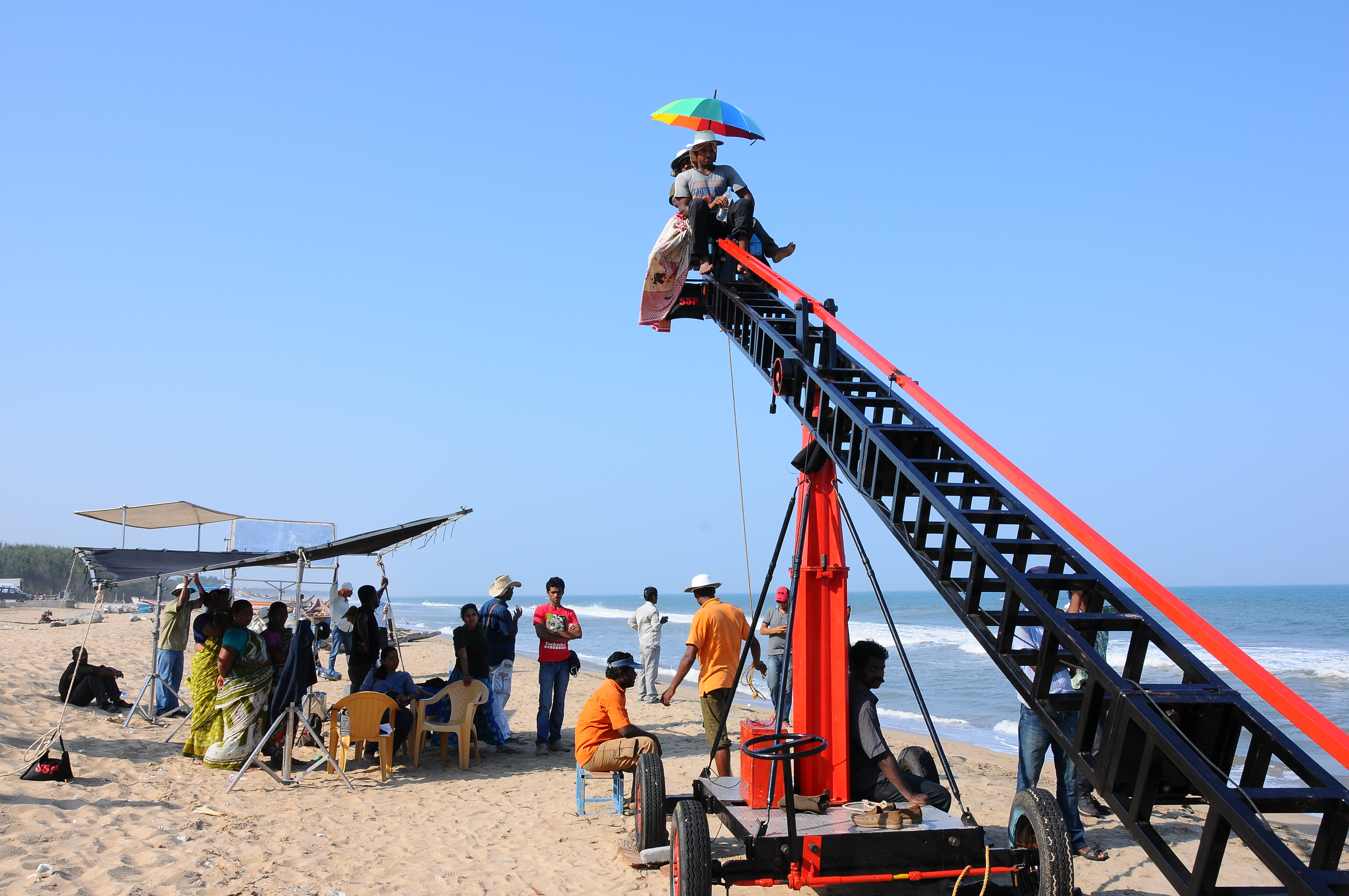
Filming of Lessons in Forgetting.

Shot entirely in India across
-Bangalore (Karnataka, India).
-Pondicherry (Tamil Nadu, India).
-Mahabalipuram (Tamil Nadu, India).
-Coonoor/ Mettupalayam (Tamil Nadu, India).

== Crew ==
Director	Unni Vijayan
Screenplay	Anita Nair
Director of Photography	Vishawamangal Kitsu
Editing	Unni Vijayan/Mandar Khanvilkar
Sound Designer	Gissy Michael
Production Designer	Malay Bhattacharya
Makeup Designer	Roshan N.G
Music	Ganesh Kumaresh
Casting Director	Nilesh Maniyar
Costume Designer	Manoviraj Khosla
Executive Producer	Rajagopalan Achu

== Awards ==
- Unni Vijayan, Director - Outstanding Achievement In International Feature Filmmaking - Williamsburg International Film Festival, New York (2012)
- Adil Hussain : Best Actor - New Jersey Independent South Asian Cine Fest, New Jersey.(2012)
- Roshni Achreja : Best Supporting Actress - New Jersey Independent South Asian Cine Fest, New Jersey.(2012)
- Roshan N. G., Best Makeup Artist - Sunset International Film Festival, Los Angeles. (2012)
- 60th National Film Award for Best Feature Film in English

== Screenings ==
- Rome International Film Festival 2012 (RIFF)
- Chicago South Asian Film Festival 2012 (CSAFF)
- Williamsburg International Film Festival, New York
- New Jersey Independent South Asian Cine Fest, New Jersey (2012)
- Sunset International Film Festival, Los Angeles (2012)
