= Sensible Sensuality =

2010 book by Sarojini Sahoo

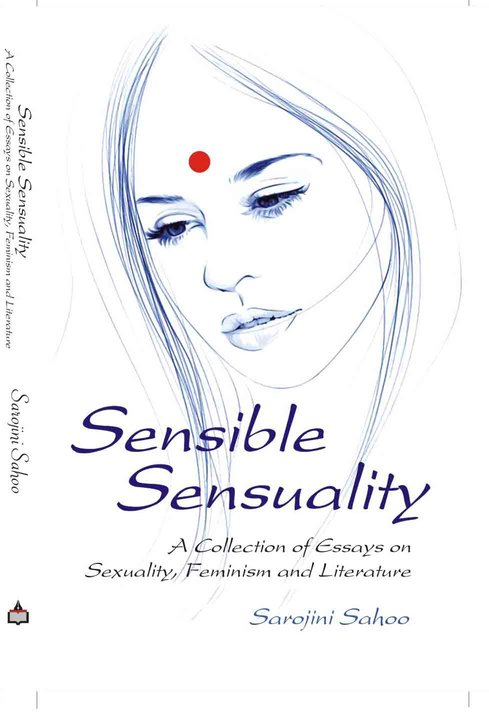
- Book Cover of Sensible Sensuality
- Author: Sarojini Sahoo
- Language: English
- Genre: Philosophy; Feminism
- Publisher: Authors Press, Delhi
- Publication date: 2010
- Publication place: India
- Media type: Hardback
- Pages: 184
- ISBN: 978-81-7273-541-8

Sensible and Sensuality is a collection of essays by Indian writer Sarojini Sahoo.

== Feminism ==
Sahoo's fiction focuses on aspects of human experience, like puberty and menopause. She argues that women's sexual liberation was the real motive behind the "women's movement."

Sahoo argues that orgasm is the body's natural call to feminist politics.

In South Asian Outlook, an e-magazine published from Canada, Menka Walia writes: "Sahoo typically evolves her stories around Indian women and sexuality, which is something not commonly written about, but is rather discouraged in a traditionalist society. As a feminist, she advocates women's rights and usually gives light to the injustices Eastern women face. In her interviews, she usually talks about the fact that women are second-class citizens in India, backing up these facts with examples of how love marriages are forbidden, the rejection of divorces, the unfairness of dowries, and the rejection of female politicians."

== Translation in other languages ==
Machhum Billah and Hassan Mehedi have translated this book into Bengali and it was published from Bangladesh by Bangla Prakash, Dhaka, in 2012. A Malayalam version of this book has been published by Chintha Publishers, Thiruvananthapuram, Kerala, in 2013, in Prameela KP's translation under the title Pennakam.

== See also ==
- List of feminists
- List of feminist literature
- The Dark Abode
- Sarojini Sahoo Stories
