= Ritu Lalit =

Indian novelist, short story writer, and blogger

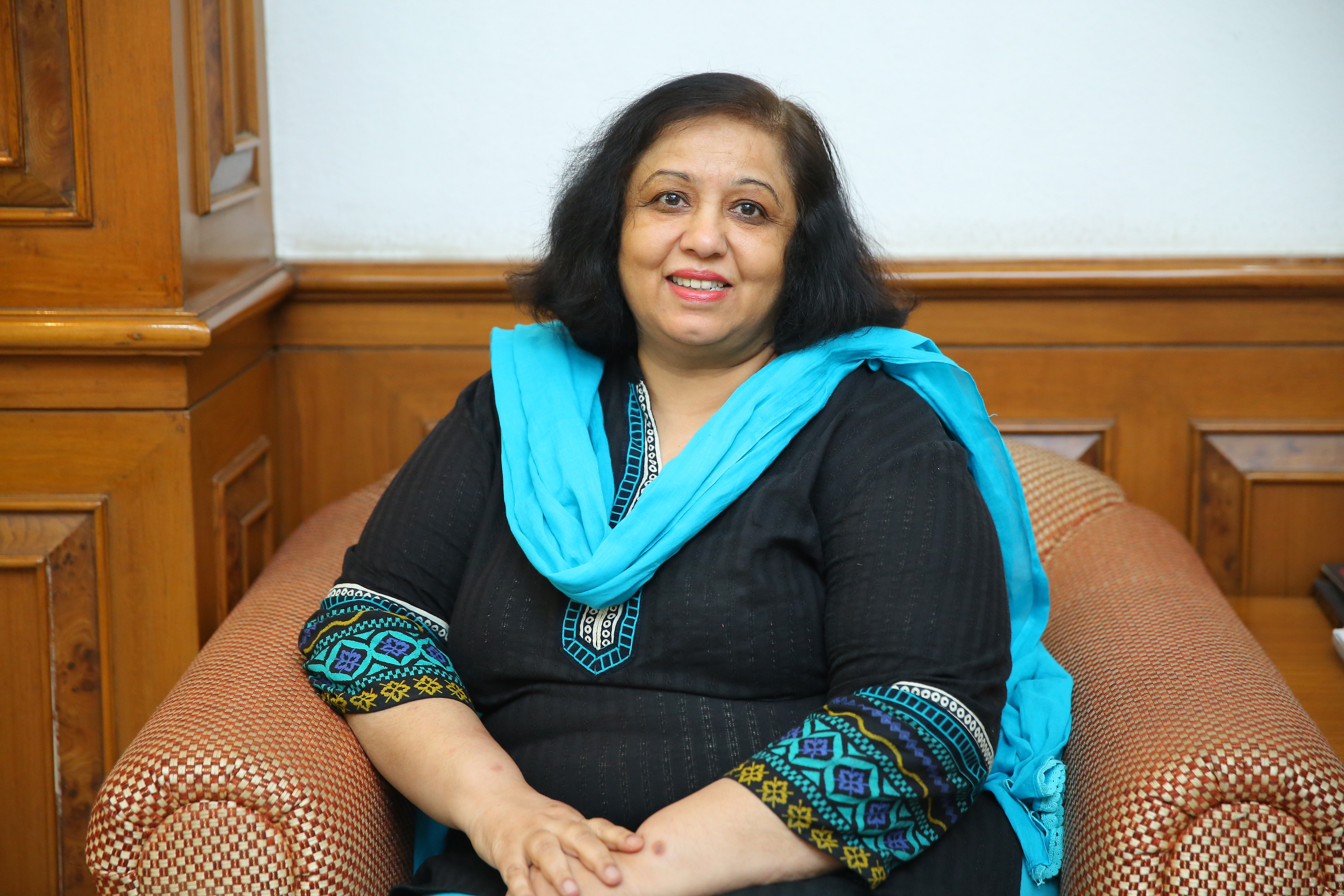
- Ritu Lalit in 2015
- Born: 1964 (age 61–62); Delhi, India
- Education: Kendriya Vidyalaya; Guwahati University; University of Delhi
- Occupations: Author, novelist, blogger
- Children: Ishan Lalit, Kartik Lalit
- Writing career
- Language: English
- Genres: Fiction, Thriller
- Notable works: A Bowlful of Butterflies; Hilawi; Chakra: Chronicles of the Witch Way; His Father’s Mistress; Wrong for the Right Reasons
- Website: www.ritulalit.com

Ritu Lalit (born 1964) is an Indian novelist, short story writer, and blogger based in Faridabad, India, noted for writing fiction and mostly of the fantasy and thriller genre. She is author of five novels, A Bowlful of Butterflies, a coming of age story about three fast friends in school, Hilawi, a fantasy thriller, and Chakra, Chronicles of the Witch Way, a fantasy adventure, Wrong for the Right Reasons, a story about a young divorcee bringing up her children and a murder mystery, and His Father's Mistress.

== Early life and education ==
Ritu Lalit was born in Delhi, India and raised in the North Eastern part of India. Her father was an electrical engineer with the Indian Government and was transferred frequently. So she received her schooling in various Kendriya Vidyalayas, passing out from Kendriya Vidyalaya Lamphelpat, Imphal, Manipur. She is gold medalist from Gauhati University in B.A. English literature (honors) and completed her master's degree in English literature from University of Delhi. She is post graduate diploma in Business Administration.

== Career ==
Ritu Lalit came out with her debut novel, A Bowlful of Butterflies in 2011, followed by Hilawi, a fantasy thriller in 2012. Before her debut novel, two of her short stories collection Ripples, a compilation by Prashant Karhade, got published in 2009. This was swiftly followed in 2011 by her full-length novel A Bowlful of Butterflies, being long-listed for the Crossword Book Award. Lalit's second work of fiction Hilawi, published by Popular Prakashan in 2012, is a fantasy thriller, which explores the fact that legends are not mere tales. After success of her debut novel A Bowlful of Butterflies and Hilawi, inspired by Panchtantra’s fables and the Vedic concept of energy vortexes in the human body, the author came out with her third novel Chakra: Chronicles of the Witch Way in May 2013. In 2014, she launched her fourth novel His Father's Mistress, published by LiFi Publications and in 2015 she came out with another novel, Wrong for the Right Reasons.

Her short stories are taught as a part of class 8 and class 12 of Central Board of Secondary Education (CBSE) syllabus. Two of her stories were also published by National Council of Educational Research and Training. She blogs and writes also under the name of Phoenix Ritu.

== Works ==
- Ripples (a collection of short stories), APK Publishers; Compiled by Prashant Karhade 2010
- A Bowlful of Butterflies. Rupa & Co. 13 October 2012. ISBN 978-812912-312-1.
- Hilawi, Popular Prakashan, 2012
- Chakra, Chronicles of the Witch Way, Author's Empire Publications, 2013
- His Father's Mistress. LiFi Publications. 2014. ISBN 9789382536376.
- Wrong, for the Right Reasons. Createspace Independent Pub. 2014. ISBN 9781502553850.

== See also ==
- List of Indian women writers
