= Cut Like Wound =

2012 novel by Anita Nair

- Front cover
- Author: Anita Nair
- Genre: Novel
- Set in: Bengaluru, India
- Published: 2012
- Publisher: HarperCollins (India), Bitter Lemon Press (UK and US)
- Publication place: India
- Media type: Print
- Pages: 358
- ISBN: 978-1-908-52436-2
- OCLC: 877085123
- Website: www.anitanair.net/novels/Cut-Like-Wound/

Cut Like Wound is a detective fiction novel written by Anita Nair, set in the city of Bengaluru. The novel, written in Indian English, was first published in India by HarperCollins. To bring out the true functioning of a police establishment in India, the author interacted in real life with the officials in a police station. It is Anita Nair's first book of crime fiction. This book also marks the entry of Borei Gowda as detective protagonist.

== Plot ==
The story of the novel Cut Like Wound begins on the first evening of Ramzan, 1 August 2012, and ends about a month later in September on St Mary's Feast. On the first evening of Ramzan, in Bengaluru, a call girl decides to go out in the public for the first time. She is a transgender person who is said to be a psychopath, and lures a victim and kills him. More murders occur and past murders are also linked to it. The investigation into the murder is conducted by Inspector Gowda and Santosh. Combating apathy both at personal and professional levels, Gowda manages to crack the case. He discovers a set pattern to the murders, which leads to his conclusion that these murders might be the work of a serial killer. The novel is told across the sights and smells of Bangalore and speaks about the people, customs and geography of the city.

== Characters ==
- Borei Gowda, a diligent middle-aged police inspector assigned the task of investigating a coldblooded murder committed by a transgender person called Bhuvana.
- Gowda's wife Mamatha, who lives with their son Roshan in Hassan. Roshan is a drug addict, and the family meets rarely.
- Urmila, the former girl friend of Gowda, who meets him after 27 years which disturbs him emotionally.
- Vidyaprasad, Gowda's superior, an Assistant Commissioner of Police.
- Santosh, a Sub-Inspector, is Gowda's assistant in the criminal investigation.
- Anna/Caddie Ravi, Corporator of the area and one time goon who worked as a caddie before venturing into politics.

== Publication ==
The novel was first published in India in 2012 by HarperCollins. It was published in the UK and USA by Bitter Lemon Press, and by Ugo Guanda Editore, Duomo Ediciones S L and A.W. Bruna Uitgevers B.V in Italy, Spain and the Netherlands respectively. An audio version of the book was published by Audible.com with narration provided by Sartaj Garewal.

== Reception ==
The novel received mixed reviews from critics. The Hindustan Times, in their review, found the plotting of the novel "tight", and praised the portrayal of Inspector Gowda. The Sunday Guardian wrote in their review:

The novel is a commentary on the lives of the sexually marginalised, on the blurring of gender expectations, and the emotional baggage carried by both men and women in a world of role-playing and self-presentation.

However, according to a review published on the website Women's Web the only character portrayed well in the novel was that of Inspector Gowda, and it was claimed that "The search for a good Indian crime fiction series remains unsatisfied; Anita Nair’s Cut Like Wound is a messy mash of characters and styles."

Laura Wilson in her review of this book in The Guardian has observed: "...is a welcome addition to the ranks of flawed-but-lovable fictional cops."
