= Kit Reed =

American author

- Born: Lillian Hyde Craig; June 7, 1932; San Diego, California, U.S.
- Died: September 24, 2017 (aged 85)
- Education: College of Notre Dame of Maryland
- Occupation: Author
- Relatives: Lillian Hyde and John R. Craig
- Writing career
- Pen name: Kit Craig
- Genres: Speculative fiction and literary fiction
- Notable work: Kit Reed bibliography
- Notable awards: Guggenheim Fellow
- Website: Official website

Kit Reed, also known as Lillian Hyde Craig or Lil(l)ian Craig Reed (June 7, 1932 – September 24, 2017), (Note: Many sources spell her first name "Lillian", although some spell it "Lilian".) was an American author of both speculative fiction and literary fiction, as well as psychological thrillers under the pseudonym Kit Craig.

== Biography ==
Reed was born Lillian Hyde Craig on June 7, 1932, in San Diego, California. She was a daughter of schoolteacher Lillian Hyde and US Naval officer John R. Craig. She was nicknamed "Kitten" at an early age and later legally changed her name to Kit Reed. Her father would command the submarine USS Grampus (SS-207), which was lost with all hands early in 1943, probably sunk by the Japanese.

By age 12, she had written a series of books about a stand-up bunny rabbit. At the College of Notre Dame of Maryland (now Notre Dame of Maryland University), nuns let her write short stories instead of a research paper for her senior thesis, allowing her to avoid the research she hated."

Reed worked as a journalist for a number of years, including for The St. Petersburg Times and The New Haven Register. She won awards for a series of articles about juvenile courts in Connecticut and twice was named "New England Newspaperwoman of the Year."

Reed served as a professor and resident writer at Wesleyan University for decades. She was married to Joseph Reed and had three children including Kate Maruyama, who is also an author. Reed died on September 24, 2017, at age 85, after being diagnosed with an inoperable brain tumor.

== Writing ==
Reed's first short story, "The Wait" (1958), was published by Anthony Boucher in The Magazine of Fantasy & Science Fiction. She is a Guggenheim Fellow and recipient of a five-year grant literary from the Abraham Woursell Foundation.

The New York Times Book Review said about her short fiction in 2006: "Reed has a prose style that's pure dry ice, displayed in dystopian stories that specialize in bitterness and dislocation." The Wall Street Journal said: "The title of Kit Reed's [2013] selection of her own short stories, The Story Until Now (Wesleyan), reminds us that although she has been writing award-winning fiction for some 50 years, she's still accelerating. The scope of these 35 stories is immense, their variety unmatched."

Her stories appeared in venues ranging from The Magazine of Fantasy & Science Fiction to The Yale Review and The Kenyon Review, and are widely anthologized. Many of her stories are published as feminist science fiction and she was nominated for the James Tiptree Jr. Award three times. In 2005 her novel, Thinner Than Thou, was given the Alex Award by the Young Adult Library Services Association (YALSA), a division of the American Library Association (ALA).
