= Chandramani Singh =

Indian art historian (1940–2022)

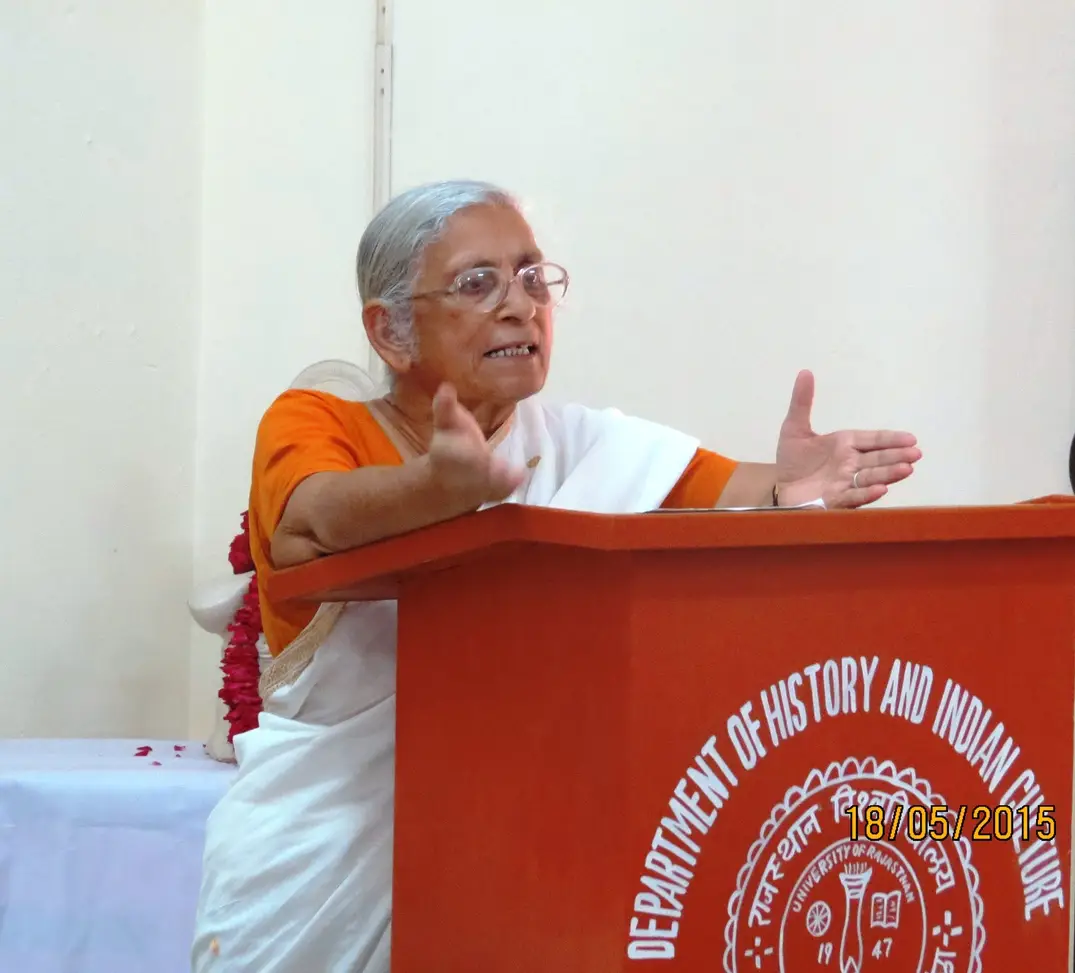
- Born: 5 April 1940; Varanasi, Uttar Pradesh
- Died: 15 May 2022 (aged 82); Jaipur, Rajasthan
- Occupations: Art historian; writer; archivist

Chandramani Singh (5 April 1940 – 15 May 2022) was an Indian art historian, textile expert, writer and a museum archivist based in Jaipur, Rajasthan. As a writer, Singh had edited and authored numerous works on museums, culture, and heritage. Her notable works include Jaipur Rajya ka Itihas, Art Treasures of Rajasthan, Performing Arts of Rajasthan: Lok-Rang, and Protected Monuments of Rajasthan among others. She was associated with Banaras Hindu University, the Sawai Mansingh II City Palace Museum and Jawahar Kala Kendra. She had also worked for the restoration of the Jaigarh Fort, Jaipur. She died in 2022 after a prolonged illness.

== Early life and education ==
Singh was born on 5 April 1940 in Banaras (now Varanasi), Uttar Pradesh. She completed her M. A. in Indian Art and Architecture and Senior Diploma in Shilpa Shastras from Banaras Hindu University. She also obtained her doctorate from Banaras Hindu University itself. After this, she studied at University of Michigan in the United States of America.

Singh recalled in an interview that she had been inspired by her teachers at the Fine Arts College at Banares but she became serious about building a career after she was widowed soon after her marriage. She was asked to make drawings for a museum and that is how she entered the field of museum studies. Her knowledge of art and architecture, history of textiles, and expertise in documentation led to significant research contributions to museum studies.

== Career ==
Singh started her career at the Bharat Kala Bhavan at Banaras Hindu University Museum. She hailed from Varanasi, but for nearly 50 years, she had made Jaipur her field of work and was associated with the Sawai Mansingh Museum Trust at City Palace and Jawahar Kala Kendra. She had joined Maharaja Sawai Mansingh Museum as Registrar in April 1973. She worked for Jaigarh Fort for a few years. Later, she worked with Jawahar Kala Kendra as the Director of Documentation from 1990 to 2002. She also remained associated with Prakrit Bharti Academy. Furthet, Singh was also Tagore National Scholar to research for Archaeological Survey of India. She was in the advisory committee of INTACH, Jaipur chapter.

=== Projects ===
Singh worked at the museum and library of City Palace Museum, Jaipur for almost a decade. Her work on textiles and manuscript led to a range of scholarship that showcased Indian museums as having indigenous value beyond the colonial gaze. When she started working for the Jaigarh Fort, it was a protected monument by Archaeological Survey of India and it was not possible to make any changes in its structure. She first undertook the exercise of getting it de-protected and then did a lot of restoration work including creating a museum in the fort. While working as a director of documentation at Jawahar Kala Kendra, she got lot of documentation done for arts, crafts, and monuments of Rajasthan and even set up amuseum and organised many art exhibitions.

Another important project that she undertook was documenting the little known forts of twenty seven districts in Rajasthan. The project documented two hundred forts which are part of fifteen published volumes. She also worked extensively in the field of folk music. As a result, thousands of hours of musical recordings are archived at Jawahar Kala Kendra. As a Tagore National Fellow of Archeological survey of India, she documented the deserted towns of Rajasthan and traced their historicity. For example, she researched on the town of Peeparda in Rajasthan was once a military cantonment of Jaigarh but is now deserted. She contributed to heritage protection, museum studies, and academic research as member of advisory committee of INTACH, and by delivering specialised lectures at Centre for Museology and Conservation, University of Rajasthan, and through her association with Prakrit Bharati Akademi, Jaipur.

=== Publications ===
Singh was a prolific writer and authored many books on arts, crafts, museum collections, and history. She showcased her research on heritage objects, museums, monuments and history. She had a wide range of research interests that is reflected in the numerous themes she explored in her publications.

- Centres of Pahari Painting (1981) - In this book, Singh presents an overview of the history, themes, and treatment of Pahari painting. Important centres are profiled in detail such as Guler, Kangra, Jasrota, Jammu, Mandi, Chamba, Bilaspur, Nurpur, Kullu, and Gadhwal. The book has numerous monochromes and colour illustrations. It is a detailed study of stylistic evolution and regional variations of Pahari painting. It covers the decorative patterns of mid-sixteenth to mid-seventeenth centuries and the shift to naturalistic patterns through direct and indirect Mughal influence.
- Treasures of the Albert Hall Museum, Jaipur (2009) – The book is a thorough presentation of the collections of the Albert Hall Museum with a historical analysis of various galleries like carpets, pottery, arms, textile, sculpture etc.
- Protected Monuments of Rajasthan (2002, digitized 2009) – Protected Monuments under various acts of the Central and State Governments have been described in detail. It is quite an exhaustive compendium.
- Museums of Rajasthan (2010)
- Women of Rajasthan (2015) – It is a historical study of contribution of women in the formation of Rajasthan
- Udaipur Museum, by Chandramani Singh, Sumahendra (2008)
- Catalogue of Historic Documents in Kapad Dwara, Jaipur: Maps and Plans by Maharaja Sawai Man Singh II Museum. Kapad Dwara, Gopalnarayan Bahura, Chandramani Singh (1988)
- Bhāgwat Purāṇa, Rājasthāna Prācyavidyā Pratishṭhāna (2007) – This is catalogue of paintings from the collection of Rājasthāna Prācyavidyā Pratishṭhāna.
- Pathways to Literature, Art, and Archaeology, Pt. Gopal Narayan Bahura Felicitation Volume (1991)
- Textiles and Costumes from the Maharaja Sawai Man Singh II Museum (1979)
- A Review of Basohli Style in Indian Painting (1974)
- Art Treasures of Rajasthan, Volume 1 (2004)
- Marriage songs from Bhojpuri Region (1979)
- Visual Music -Ragamala Paintings of Rajasthan by Sumahendra, Chandramani Singh (2005) – This is a portfolio that emerged from the exhibition by same title held at Jawahar Kala Kendra, Jaipur.
- Woollen Textiles and Costumes from Bharat Kala Bhavan (1981)
- Chhavi. Golden Jubilee Volume. Bharat Kala Bhavan, 1920-1970. (Editor: Anand Krishna. Assistant Editor: Chandramani Singh.). (1971)
- राजस्थान के निर्माण में स्त्रियों का योगदान 1200-1900 ई. राजस्थान के संदर्भ में (2016)
- Cittauṛa kī Mahārānī Padminī kī aitihāsikatā itihāsa aura maukhika paramparā para ādhārita sāhitya samanvaya se by Chandramani Singh, Surendra Bothara (2020) – This is a study on the life of Padmavati, Queen, consort of Ratana Siṃha I, Rana of Chitor, active 1303. The historicity of the queen has been analysed through written sources as well as oral traditions, with special reference to Padmāvata, Awadhi narrative poem. The book has been translated in English as Historicity of Padmini.
- जयपुर राज्य का इतिहास (सचित्र) (2013) – This book vividly portrays the History of Jaipur from the arrival of Kachawahas to Amber till the capital is shifted to Jaipur and the princely state is eventually integrated into Rajasthan in the Republic of India.
- Visionary, Vision and Wisdom Select Speeches from Palace Archives (2013)

Singh also wrote many articles on art history, textiles and museum collections. Some of which include Guṇijanakhānā, Cultural Heritage of Jaipur, Jaipur, 1979 in Proceedings of Rajasthan History Congress and The History and Art of Jaipur Painting: A Reappraisal In: Maruti Nandan Tiwari and Kamal Giri (eds), Indian Art and Aesthetics, New Delhi Aryan 2004.

== Awards and recognition ==
In 1972, Singh received a national award from Ministry of Information and Broadcasting for designing and planning art books for Chhavi. She was also awarded by Government of Rajasthan for her contribution to art and culture in 2015. Her expert opinion was sought on important matters of the history and culture of Rajasthan be it the controversy surrounding the film Padmaavat or the elation of recognition of Jaipur as World Heritage City by UNESCO.
