= Elangbam =

Elangbam is a given name and a surname.

Notable people with the given name include:

- Elangbam Panthoi Chanu (born 1996), Indian footballer
- Elangbam Nilakanta Singh (1927–2000), Indian poet and critic

Notable people with the surname include:

- Abenao Elangbam (born 1986), Indian actress
- Bondina Elangbam, Indian writer, poet and artist
