= Ente Upasana =

- Poster
- Directed by: Bharathan
- Screenplay by: Thoppil Bhasi
- Based on: Upasana by Mallika Yunis
- Produced by: Joy Thomas
- Starring: Mammootty; Suhasini; Nedumudi Venu
- Cinematography: Vasanth Kumar
- Edited by: Nazeer
- Music by: Johnson
- Production company: Jubilee Productions
- Distributed by: Jubilee Productions
- Release date: 14 November 1984
- Country: India
- Language: Malayalam

Ente Upasana is a 1984 Malayalam film, directed by Bharathan, written by Thoppil Bhasi, starring Mammootty and Suhasini. The film is based on the award-winning novel Upasana by Mallika Yunis. The film was remade in Telugu as Karpoora Deepam starring Murali Mohan, Suhasini and Sharat Babu. The film was a commercial success.

== Plot ==
Lathika is a working single mother of a son named Jagadish. Her flashback reveals a happy life in her village with her widowed mother and her cousin Sreekumar, his parents, her uncle, aunt and their grandmother. She is in love with her cousin who works in the Gulf and they are engaged to be married. Sreekumar leaves for the Gulf after a trip back home, and Lathika waits for the day of his return and their impending marriage. Arjunan, a close friend's brother on a fateful rainy day drives Lathika home in his car, but the former can not control his feelings and hence rapes her. Lathika becomes pregnant. She moves to a big city to give birth to the child, and her mother passes away due to the shock.

Back to the present, Lathika meets Arjunan, who is now her boss. She and her best friend live together in a hostel. One day Lathika's son contracts fever and is hospitalised. He is moved from the common ward to a private room by Arjunan. Latikha rushes to the room and is taken aback to see first Arjunan and later his mother arrive to take care of her son.

One day by chance her ex-lover (cousin) Sreekumar finds out about Lathika's tribulations after he left for the Gulf, and in anger he beats up Arjunan. Sreekumar apologizes to Lathika and asks her to attend his own wedding. Lathika returns to her hometown and reunites with her aunt and grandmother. She is visited by Arjunan in her hometown and finally they live together as a family with her son.

== Cast ==
- Mammootty as Arjunan
- Suhasini as Lathika
- Nahas Shah as Sreekumar, Lathika's cousin
- Nedumudi Venu as Lathika's uncle
- Unnimary as Lekha
- Meena Joseph as Arjunan's mother
- K. P. A. C. Lalitha as Gauri, Lathika's aunt
- Cochin Hanifa as Doctor
- Sabitha Anand as Arjunan's sister

== Soundtrack ==
The music was composed by Johnson and the lyrics were written by Poovachal Khader.

No.	Song	Singers	Lyrics	Length (m:ss)
1	"Sundarippoovinu Naanam"	S. Janaki	Poovachal Khader	4:09
2	"Sundarippoovinu Naanam" (Pathos)	S. Janaki	Poovachal Khader	1:06
3	"Yaanam Anantham"	K. J. Yesudas	Poovachal Khader	3:23
