= Neelam Saxena Chandra =

Indian poet and author (born 1969)

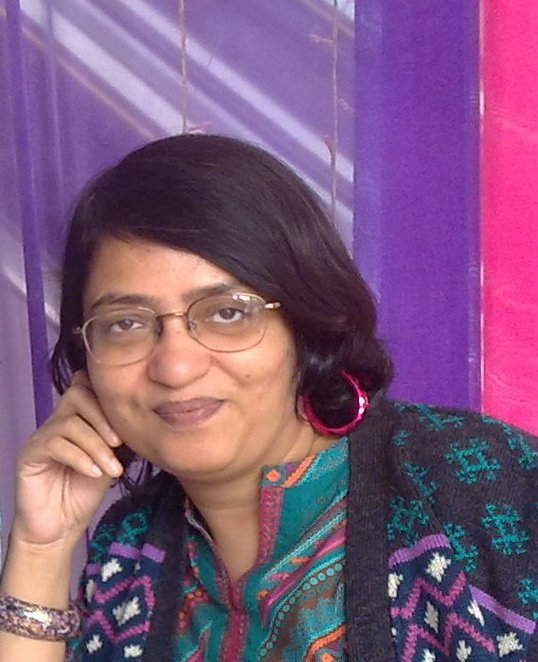
- Neelam Saxena
- Born: 27 June 1969 (age 57); Nagpur, Maharashtra, India
- Education: Visvesvaraya National Institute of Technology; Hislop College
- Occupations: Writer, author, bureaucrat
- Spouse: Prafulla Chandra
- Children: Simran Chandra
- Writing career
- Language: English, Hindi
- Genres: Poetry, fiction
- Notable awards: Radio City Freedom Awards
- Website: neelamsaxenachandra.com

Neelam Saxena Chandra (born 27 June 1969) is an Indian poet and author. She has written novels, short stories, children's stories, and poetry in English and Hindi.

== Biography ==
Chandra has authored four novels, a novella, five collections of short stories, 25 collections of poetry, and 10 books for children. She has received several awards including the "Rabindranath Tagore International Award" in 2014. given by Xpress Publications. She was awarded a prize in a poetry contest organized by the Consulate General of the United States, Mumbai, on the topic Poetry for Social Change. The song Mere Sajan Sun Sun, for which she was the lyricist won a 'Popular Choice Award' in the Folk Fusion category at the Radio City Freedom Awards. She was shortlisted for the IPR Annual Award 2020.

She is an IES Officer (1992 batch), and has also served as Joint Secretary of Union Public Service Commission (UPSC). She served as Executive Director of Pune Metro and now serves as Director (Systems) in Madhya Pradesh Metro Rail Corporation Limited, Bhopal.

== Awards and recognition ==
- 2014: Rabindranath Tagore International Poetry Award from Xpress Publications: Kerala, India.
- Lyricist of Mere Sajan Sun Sun which won a 'Popular Choice' award at the Radio City Freedom Awards.
- 2014: Featured in Forbes India Celebrity 100 Nominees long list 2014.
- 2018: Humanity International Women Achievers Awards by Aditya Birla Hospital.
- 2018: Soninder Samman for contribution in Hindi Literature.

== See also ==
- List of Indian writers
- List of Indian poets
- List of Hindi-language authors
- List of Indian women writers
- List of children's literature writers
