= Vidya Subramaniam =

Indian Tamil-language author

Vidya Subramaniam (born 1957) is a Tamil author. She has been writing novels and short stories for close to three decades. Born and brought up in Mylapore, she has to her credit 100 books and has won awards including a Tamil Nadu State Award.

An anthology of her short stories has been translated into English titled Beyond the Frontier. Two of her short stories have also been translated and featured in a book titled Anthology of Tamil Pulp Fiction from the Blaft stable.
