= Pitambari Debi =

Indian writer and lexicographer (1940–?)

- ପୀତାମ୍ବରୀ ଦେବୀ
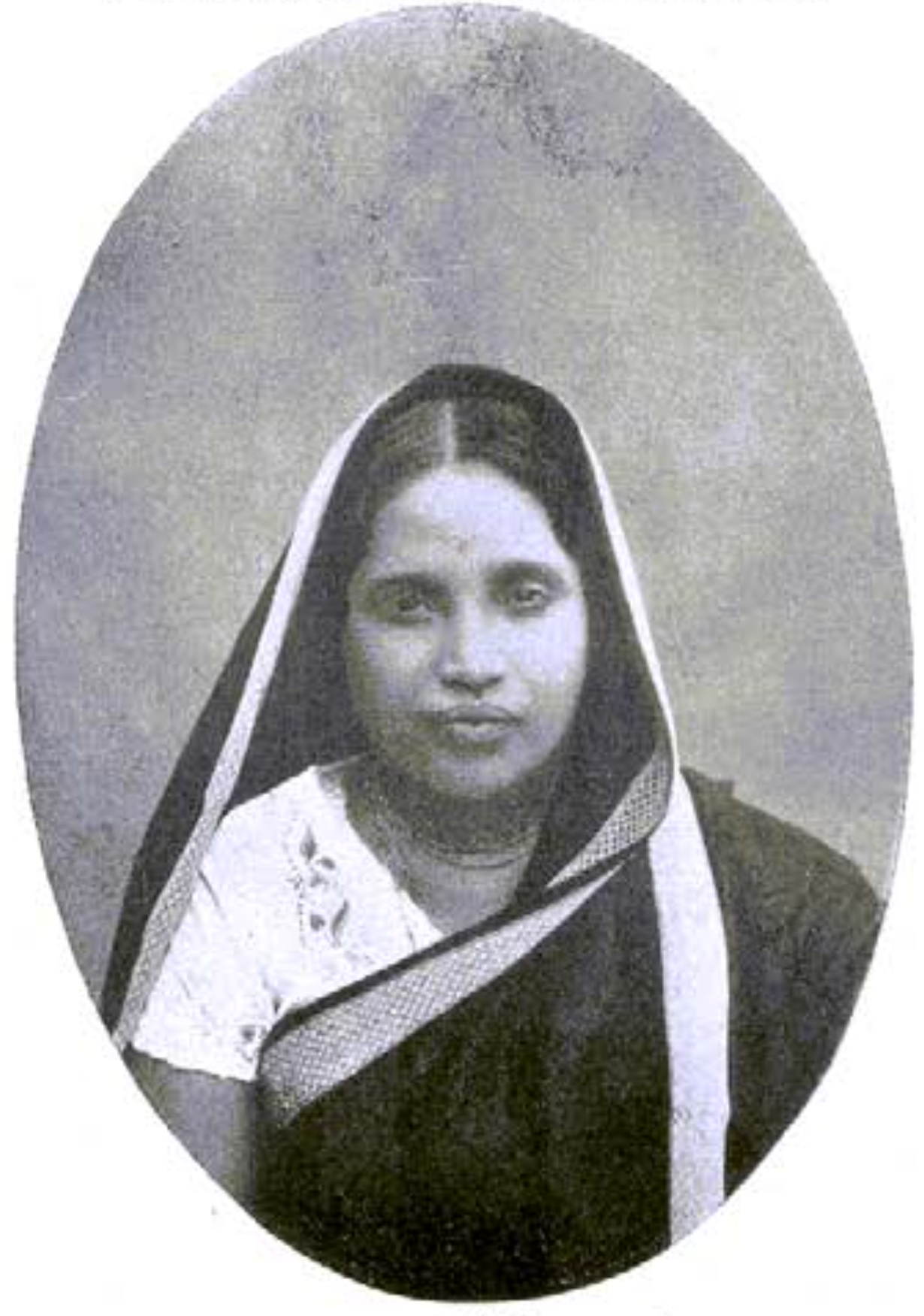
- Born: June 12, 1904; Puri district, Bengal Presidency
- Occupation: Writer
- Writing career
- Language: Odia, English

Pitambari Debi (12 June 1904 – ?) was an Indian writer of Odia literature, best remembered for coauthoring the Lexicon of the Oriya Language, and her book Kantara Babu (1931).
