= Lakshmi Kannan =

Indian poet and novelist

Lakshmi Kannan, also known by her Tamil pen name Kaaveri, (born 1947) is an Indian poet, novelist and short story writer. Writing in Tamil, she translates her works into English. Her poetry has received positive reviews in the Indian press.

== Biography ==
Born in Mysore in south-western India on 13 August 1947, Kannan graduated in English language and literature at the University of Delhi before earning a PhD from Calcutta's Jadavpur University in 1977. In addition to her writing, Kannan has spent at least 15 years teaching English. In 1993, she was writer in residence at the University of Kent in Canterbury, England. Thereafter, career assignments have included fellow of the Indian Institute of Advanced Study in Shimla, India, convenor for Tamil Bhasha Samiti at the K.K. Birla Foundation, Delhi, scholar in residence at the American Studies Research Centre in Hyderabad, group chief, Bharat Soka Gakkai, member of the governing body of the Poetry Society of India and member of the jury for the Commonwealth Writers Prize, Eurasia. She has also been an honorary fellow in writing at the University of Iowa and British Council visitor at the University of Cambridge.

== Publications ==
Kannan released three poetry collections in English from 1974 to 1985, authored three short story volumes between 1986 and 1993, and published a novel in 1998. She is particularly celebrated for her sharp, brief verses concerned with a woman's search for identity, the place of nature in human experience, or cultural identity. They frequently examine how women are viewed in Indian society, adopting an increasingly feminist tone. Her short stories are her own translations of their Tamil originals. They focus on the experiences of middle-class women in both India and abroad. There is however one exception in Muniyakka which deals with the lower classes. In her novel Going Home, also translated from the original Tamil, Kannan tells the nostalgic story of a housewife in Delhi who yearns for her affluent past. The tale constantly evokes the hypocrisy of cultured Tam Brahm communities.

=== Poems ===
- 1974: Impressions: Poems. Writers Workshop, Calcutta
- 1976: The Glow and the Grey: Poems. Writers Workshop, Calcutta
- 1985: Exiled Gods: Poems. Arnold-Heinemann, Delhi

=== Short stories ===
- 1986: Rhythms: Short Fiction. Translated from the original Tamil by the author. Vikas, Delhi, ISBN 978-0-70693-053 5
- 1992: Parijata and Other Stories: Short Fiction. Translated from the original Tamil by the author, National Publishing House, Delhi, ISBN 978-81-214-0459-4
- 1993: India Gate and Other Stories: Short Stories. Translated from the original Tamil by the author, Orient BlackSwan Private Limited, Delhi, ISBN 978-0-86311-345-1

=== Novel ===
- 1998: Going Home: Novel. Translated from the original Tamil by the author. Orient BlackSwan Private Limited, Delhi, ISBN 978-81-250-1611-3

== Personal details ==
Kannan was married to L.V. Kannan, now deceased. She lives in New Delhi, India.
