= C. K. Meena =

- Born: 27 July 1957 (age 69)
- Occupations: Novelist, journalist, teacher, chairperson Toto Funds the Arts

C. K. Meena is an Indian journalist, novelist and newspaper columnist. She is a science graduate who went on to pursue her M.A in English and B.S. in Communication from Bangalore University. She started her career at The City Tab, a Bangalore weekly tabloid, in the 1980s and worked at Deccan Herald from 1986 to 1993, after which she co-founded the Asian College of Journalism in Bangalore.

In 2005, Dronequill published her first novel, Black Lentil Doughnuts, followed by Dreams for the Dying (2008) and Seven Days to Somewhere (2012). She has also co-authored a handbook on adoption. She co-authored the first non academic book on disability titled The Invisible Majority: India's Abled Disabled (2021). She has been writing "City Lights", a fortnightly column, for The Hindu Metro Plus since 2002.

== Writing style ==
In her own words, "Writing is so deliberate, one is working at it all the time, trying to create an effect, so there’s less spontaneity, but at the same time, one is also saying it out aloud in one's head, telling the story to an imaginary audience. I love telling stories, and hearing stories; I am a shameless eavesdropper, and I can be totally poker-faced; I can even hear things said in an undertone."

Charumathi Supraja reckons after doing an interview with her, "Meena decimates stereotypes in her writing. She etches out real “characters” in her stories. There’s a swagger to her writing that’s not conceited – just original. You’ll find a chuckle beneath many a line. Lush, leisurely descriptions don’t fit Meena’s writing persona. But don’t expect to drop the book till you’ve followed every twist, sparkle and glint in her neatly laid out story."

Meena was influenced by T G Vaidyanathan.

== Feminism ==
Meena is a feminist. From one of her interviews, "Why are women in the centre? Not the man but the woman. For me, women are in the centre, whether I like it or not. It’s possibly linked to the feminist perspective that I have always had. Somehow when I start writing I find that it’s the women who take centre stage, the men are either not very nice guys (laughs) or are incidental."

== Works ==
Her first novel, Black Lentil Doughnuts was published in 2005. In it, Meena talks about Shanthi and her alter-ego Lilly who escape the oppressive warmth of their small town to taste the freedom of an emerging metropolis. Shanthi is seduced by the anarchism of the Three Mosquitoes, while Lilly's seductions are on more predictable lines. But all the while they are being stalked by an insane mass hysteria that sees them as outsiders C K Meena takes the readers on a roller coaster ride through the love and hate, gentleness and brutality that is metropolitan India.

Black Lentil Doughnuts
- Author: C K Meena
- Language: English
- Publisher: Dronequill Publishers, 2005
- Publication place: India
- Pages: 274
- ISBN: 978-818927604-1

=== Other works ===
- Seven Days to Somewhere.
- Adoption: what, why, when, how.
- Dreams for the Dying.

==== Articles ====
- Walk into the night without fear
- This lady is a tramp
