= Prakrit Bharati Academy =

Library in India

- Location: Jaipur, Rajasthan, India
- Type: Public library
- Established: 21 February 1977

Collection
- Size: approx. 75,000 books, 40 magazines and 28 newspapers

Access and use
- Population served: 55,100 reader inclusive of 4500 membership (2013–14)

Prakrit Bharati Academy is a public library established on 21 February 1977 in Jaipur with the prime goal to publish books in Prakrit, Sanskrit, Hindi other Indian languages in simplified English to benefit pursuance of wisdom for laymen and scholars alike. Spread over 3368.84 meters surrounded by Universities and Engineering institutes on Calgary road on Malviya Nagar area, It is also recognized by several universities as an eminent Library (475/1976-77), Study Center and Publication House.

== Publications ==
The academy had published more than 335 books and 60 comic serials. It have also published a large number of translated work mainly in English and Hindi of publications of classical languages like Prakrit, Sanskrit, Persian, Chinese etc. to revive their vanishing literature. The Encyclopedia of Aprigraha is an important research work published by the academy.

== Library ==
The reference library houses more than 80,000 books. There are more than 4500 members of the library mainly students and scholars. This library primarily caters to researchers of the academy.
