= Manorama Jafa =

Indian writer of children's literature (born 1932)

- Born: 1932 (age 93–94); India
- Occupation: Writer
- Spouse: Virendra Singh Jafa
- Children: Asim Jafa, Dr. Navina Jafa
- Awards: Padma Shri, Order of the Rising Sun

Manorama Jafa is an Indian author of more than 100 books for children, as well as feminist novels for adults, and academic research and writing on children's literature. She has served as Secretary General of the Association of Writers and Illustrators for Children and as the Secretary General of the Indian National Section of the International Board on Books for Young People. She was awarded the Padma Shri in 2014 and the Order of the Rising Sun in 2016.

== Early life and education ==
Jafa was born in 1932. Jafa completed a master's degree in Geography from the University of Allahabad. She also later completed a course in writing for children at the Massachusetts Institute of Technology.

== Career ==
Creativity starts at a very young age. To garner and hone it further, it is very important that it is polished and harnessed right from the very beginning, says Manorama Jafa.

Jafa began writing in the late 1960s, starting with local newspaper columns before developing stories. Her first children’s book was titled Donkey on the Bridge. Other works for children include The Parrot and the Mynah, Laughing Parrot, and The Ladybird and the Butterfly, which, according to Dipanita Nath of The Indian Express, make "clear that Manorama sticks to earthy values, especially unity in diversity."

Some of her works, such as Gabbar and Babbar and I am Sona, are designed for children with special needs. She has said that I am Sona was inspired by a visit to South Africa and addresses children with HIV, and her book Toru Nanu and Hipu is written for children who became orphans after the Indian Ocean tsunami. In a 1996 discussion of her 1995 book Gandhi: The Man of Peace in Indian Review of Books, she is referred to as "one of the pioneers of children's literature in English in India." Her books written for adults, including Devita, were described by Nath as having "a strong feminist accent."

In 2011, Faisal M. Naim of The Hindu wrote, "Over the past three decades, Jafa has been pioneering a movement for better books for children in India." In 1976, she began conducting workshops for authors of children's literature. Jafa has also produced many research papers on children's literature. She also co-founded the Association of Writers and Illustrators for Children (AWIC) with the cartoonist Shankar Pillai and served as director of its Children's Literacy Project beginning in 1995. She has written a book about technical writing for children, Writing For Children, and edited the AWIC quarterly children's literature journal Writer and Illustrator, which was founded in 1981. By 2006, she was the head of the Khaas Kitaab Foundation, a publisher of children's books.

From 1999 through 2001, she served as a jury member for the UNESCO prize for Children's and Young People's Literature. She was also involved with the Asian Cultural Centre for UNESCOas its children's book specialist. She has served in the juries of the IIY-Asahi Reading Promotion Award (2000-2001) as its chairperson and the UNESCO Prize for Books on Tolerance (1999-2000) as a member.

Around 2010, she founded Book Therapy, an initiative to support children who have experienced trauma, which has included the distribution of books to Afghanistan and areas of India impacted by a tsunami. She has also served as a consultant for the Children's Book Trust. She has also been associated with the National Book Trust, New Delhi, as its editorial consultant.

Jafa is the General Secretary of the Indian National Section of the International Board on Books for Young People (IBBY). She presided over the 26th Congress of the IBBY, conducted in 1998, as its Chairperson. In 1998, Jafa invited Empress Michiko of Japan to give the keynote speech at the International Board on Books for Young People (IBBY) Congress in New Delhi and later visited Empress Michiko in Japan. In 2013, as Secretary-General of the IBBY India section, she met with the Empress and introduced her to members of the group, after previously meeting her in Japan in 2004.

The Manorama Jafa Collection on Children’s Literature was donated to Ashoka University by her husband, Shri Virendra Singh Jafa. The collection includes technical books on children's literature, some of her correspondence, her Hindi novels for adults, and other materials related to children's literature.

In November 2020, she donated her books for thousands of children in the name of her life companion Mr. Virendra Singh Jafa at various NGOs like Deepalaya, Community Project Library, and various other schools including the Aaganvadaddi schools in Haryana under the Ministry of Child and Women Development.

== Honours and awards ==
In 2014, she was awarded the Padma Shri from the Government of India. In 2016, she was awarded the Order of the Rising Sun, the highest civilian award in Japan. Her Hindi novel Devika won Sahitya Kriti Samman from Hindi Academy, Delhi (2008).

== Selected works ==
- Manorama Jafa (15 October 2013). Sadako of Hiroshima. Ratna Sagar. p. 16. ISBN 978-9350360842.
- Manorama Jafa (15 October 2013). The Parrot and the Mynah. Ratna Sagar. p. 16. ISBN 978-9350360804.
- Manorama Jafa (1 January 2008). The Circle. Ratna Sagar. p. 16. ISBN 978-8170700692.
- Manorama Jafa (1 January 2011). Tree Growers. Ratna Sagar. p. 16. ISBN 978-8170700425.
- Manorama Jafa (1 January 2009). Great Tales from India. Khaas Kitab Foundation. p. 16. ISBN 978-8188236428.
- Manorama Jafa (1 January 2009). Hira. Ratna Sagar. p. 12. ISBN 978-8170700487.
- Manorama Jafa (1 November 2003). Kapil, El Amante De Los Libros (Spanish ed.). Shinsekai Kenkyusho. p. 22. ISBN 978-4880126630.
- Manorama Jafa In Kireet Joshi (ed.), Philosophy of Value-Oriented Education: Theory and Practice: Proceedings of the National Seminar, 18–20 January 2002. Indian Council of Philosophical Research. pp. 473 (2002)
- Jafa, Manorama (1994). Writing for Children. EPB Publishers. ISBN 9789971004736.

== See also ==
- International Board on Books for Young People
