= Sneha Devi =

Indian writer

Sneha Devi (1916, in Jorhat – 5 October 1990) was an Indian writer of Assamese literature. She was awarded a posthumous Sahitya Akademi Award in 1990.

== Early life ==
She was born in 1916 in Jorhat, Assam and became a notable Indian writer of Assamese literature.

== Awards ==
- Sahitya Akademi Award in 1990.
