= Shantichitra =

Indian academic and author (born 1978)

- Born: 24 April 1978 (age 48); Chennai, India
- Education: Ph.D., M.Phil., M.A
- Alma mater: Bharathidasan University
- Occupations: Author, Professor
- Relatives: Karunakaran (brother)
- Writing career
- Language: English
- Genres: Fiction, Philosophy
- Notable works: The Fractals and Lonely Marriages ISBN 978-1-948473-49-1

Shantichitra (born 24 April 1978) is an Indian academic and author, known for her 2016 novel, The Fractals. Which was republished by Notionpress in the year 2018. Her second novel is 'Lonely Marriages'which was also published in the year 2018 marks a special place for her in the genre of novels . Apart from writing novels she has written numerous short stories for newspapers and magazines and has published research papers on various literary and other critical fields such as phenomenology and existentialism.

Since 2012 she is the Head of the English Department at SRM Institute of Science and Technology, Chennai.

== Early life and education ==
Shantichitra was born to a former RAW agent in Chennai. Due to her father's job transfers, she spent a part of her childhood in Nagaland and she was then brought up to Delhi where she completed her schooling. Having travelled to several parts of India, her interests in cultures and psychology emerged. She moved back to Chennai and pursued a career in higher education. She decided to study Counselling and Psychotherapy after her post graduation qualification in literature from Holy Cross Bharathidasan University in 2002.

She completed her doctorate in English literature at Bishop Heber College, Bharathidasan University in 2011.

== Personal life ==
Shantichitra is the sister of Tamil film actor Karunakaran.

== Professional life ==
She worked as a literature teacher for several years before turning her hand into fiction. She has been serving the post of Head of the English Department at SRM Institute of Science and Technology since August 2012.

== Achievements ==
She was awarded with first place in M.Phil. at Bishop Heber college.
