= Sarjana Sharma =

Indian journalist

- Born: 18 March 1959 (age 67); Saharanpur, Uttar Pradesh, India
- Other name: Sarjana Sharma
- Education: Master in Political science, Master in Journalism & Mass Communications, P.G Diploma in translation, Deploma in Indian Art & Culture.
- Occupation: Creative Head in Kabir Communication

Sarjana Sharma (born 18 March 1959) is a senior Indian journalist who began her career at a time when there were very few women in working Hindi media. She has assisted in direction and production of many documentaries about topics such as women in non-conventional professions and women prisoners. These documentaries were shown at festivals in India, the former USSR and the United States. She was Deputy Executive Producer at Zee News.

== Biography ==
Sarjana Sharma was born in Saharanpur on 18 March 1959 in Uttar Pradesh to Krishan & Prem Lata Sharma. She finished Education with Master's degree in Political science, a post-graduate degree in Mass communication, diplomas in translation and in Indian art and culture and a photography course, Sarjana has worked in various media houses and on different beats.

== Career ==
During her 31-year journalistic career she worked with major Indian media houses and reputed international organisations like BBC and United States Information Agency. In 1995 she was key person in producing a 45 minutes TV women magazine ASMITA - this women's magazine was a trend setter which showcased Indian women in a very positive perspective.

She had a long stint with Zee News between 1998 and 2013, when she worked in different capacities, right from news desk, reporting in the field, producing special programs on news and current affairs. Among some of the popular programs that she was associated with were, Newszee Countdown, Mystery Unfolds, Ek Aur Nazaria, Vivavh Manthan. Besides, Sarjana was intensely involved in key roles for the coverage of the several general elections, and state assembly elections during her stint. In the last leg in Zee News produced directed and scripted an internationally famed program—Manthan – on great Indian heritage, culture, religion fairs festivals of India.

She was chosen one of the jury member by Prasar Bharti for Kissan Channel content selection committee (April–May 2015).

She was engaged by Indian Council for Cultural Relation as media coordinator for 27-day-long International Dance Festival. She was the main link between international dance troupes, media and embassies. This festival got wide coverage in media.

She is the first Electronic media women journalist to go to the –Kailash Mansarovar (Lord Shiva's abode in Tibet). In 17 days long journey she covered each and every aspect of the most Holy Yatra. She also produced almost 140 minute programme on Kailash Manasarovar Yatra. She has been associated with The Times of India Group and Sunday Mail while also freelancing for various newspapers and magazines. As mentioned earlier, she had a stint in the Hindi Cell of the United States Information Agency. She has written scripts for All India Radio and also worked with NCERT (National Council for Education Research and Training). Her brush with the electronic media started with a production house Aakriti. Her work has covered a wide range of issues from art and culture, travel and tourism, environment, women issues, human interest stories, organisations of the United Nations and more. Her best stories so far are the ones on Tihar Jail, women in non-conventional professions and the condition of folk artistes.

She has won several laurels in her long career for her contribution to media. Among these are Bharat Nirman Award, the 32nd Pandit Durga Prasad Dubey Award for serving Hindi (2011), Dr Sadhana International Empowerment Award and the Vedic Rattan Award 2010.

She writes her blog – RASBATIYAN a widely read Hindi blog. For best blogging she was honoured with two international awards – Parikalpna SAARC AWARD -2015 and the Blog Bhushan Award -2014.
