= Ganga Bharani Vasudevan =

Indian blogger-turned-writer

- Occupations: Blogger and author
- Writing career
- Genres: Fiction-thriller, romance
- Notable works: A Sip of Love and a Sip of Coffee (2016); A Minute to Death (2015); Just You, Me and A Secret (2012)
- Website: gangabharani.com

Ganga Bharani Vasudevan (also known as Ganga Bharani) is an Indian blogger-turned-writer. She is the author of the books Just You, Me and A Secret (2012), A Minute to Death (2015), A Sip of Love and a Sip of Coffee (2016) and Murder In The Elevator (2018).

== Biography ==
As a child, Ganga was encouraged by her father to read newspaper opinion pieces and to write. She began contributing opinion articles to Your Opinion Matters on NXGN at the age of 15. She also started blogging in 2006, starting with material that was not accepted by newspapers. After about five years, she started writing short stories and became interested in writing a book. She wrote the first chapters of her first book on her blog. After many rejections from publishers, she was contacted by a publisher about writing a book.

She has won a variety of contests for her blogging, and was shortlisted for the UK Blog Awards in 2015. One of her short stories has been made into the short film Bhimbam. Two of her short films, Tiny Steps and Candles, won awards at the WE CARE Film Festival.

Ganga is also a technical analyst.
