= The Dark Abode =

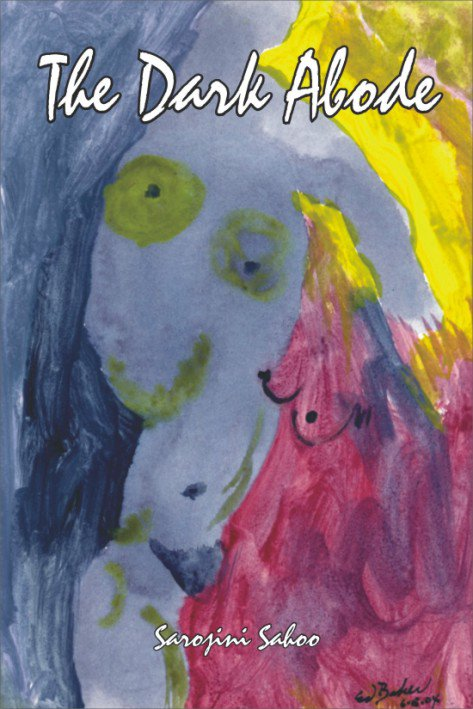
- Author: Sarojini Sahoo
- Original title: Gambhiri Ghara (ଗମ୍ଭିରି ଘର)
- Cover artist: Ed Baker
- Language: English
- Genre: Novel
- Publisher: Indian Age Communication, Amazon Kindle Books
- Publication date: 2008
- Publication place: India
- Media type: Print (Paperback), e-book
- ISBN: 978-81-906956-2-6

The Dark Abode is a collage presentation of South Asian feminist novelist Sarojini Sahoo's novel and American poet and painter Ed Baker's 23 sketches, which deal with terrorism that people often face from micro- to macrosphere.

== Plot summary ==
The novel begins with questioning the mere physicality of the man-woman relationship but then transports the reader into the higher planes of platonic love. The central character of the novel is Kuki, a Hindu woman from India who falls (and then rises) in love with a Muslim artist from Pakistan. The unusualness of the socio-cultural background of these two characters is delicately portrayed by Sahoo in a sensitive and convincing manner. Readers become familiar with the two sets of roles that Kuki plays; that of a lover and that of a wife. Sahoo subtly balances these two roles and at the same time, highlights the superiority of a wife in a pragmatic world. But the novel is not merely a love story. Though love is a part of the novel, it deals with a much broader topic: the providence of a woman in India. At the same time, it also portrays a story of how a perverted man, over time, becomes a perfect man. It also delves into the relationship between the 'state' and the 'individual' and comes to the conclusion that 'the state' represents the moods and wishes of a ruler and hence, 'the state' actually becomes a form of 'an individual'. Additionally, it takes a broader look at terrorism and state-sponsored anarchism.

== About sketches ==
Baker's Uma is a collection of sketches of the Hindu goddess, also known for feminine power. The sketches have their genesis as images in a dream, according to Baker. Uma, to him, is symbolic of many things that give us pleasure in life. As to how these images are realised, the artist confesses he is just not sure. "I just watch and wait for something to happen...and something always does," he says. It is said in the Saimdarua Lahiri that Uma is the source of all power in the universe and because of her; Shiva gets all of his powers. She is often depicted as half of Shiva, the supreme god, and she also is a major symbol of female sexuality. Her name refers to her being born daughter of Himavan (Himalaya), lord of the mountains. Beautiful, gentle, powerful consort of Shiva, mother of Ganesha and Kartikeya). Along with Saraswati and Lakshmi, she encompasses their powers and exudes a tranquil, serene beauty and provides a calm within. Uma is a symbol of many noble traditional (Hindu) virtues: fertility, marital felicity, spousal devotion, asceticism and power. She refers to the symbol of early feminine power and energy. Known formally as goddess Uma, Lady of the Mountains, she shows us how to balance the many aspects of our lives. Beautiful and (benignly) powerful, she is also known as Shakti, Parvati (consort of Shiva), Ambika, Annapurna, Bhairavi, Candi, Gauri, Durga, Jagadmata (Mother of the World), Kali, Kanyakumari, Kumari, painter Mahadevi, and Shyama.

== About the author ==
Sarojini Sahoo is an Indian feminist and author. She usually writes her short stories and novels in Oriya and her critical essays in English. She has been enlisted among 25 exceptional women of India by 'Kindle' English magazine of Kolkata. In addition to being a college professor, she is currently an Associate Editor at the English magazine Indian Age. Dr. Sahoo also has a blog 'Sense & Sensuality,' where she discusses her ideas about sexuality, spiritualism, literature, and feminism. She has published 24 books; four in English and 20 in Oriya.

== About the painter ==
Ed Baker is active in many mediums of art from drawing to writing to sculpture. He describes himself as self-made and not belonging to any 'schools' in the mediums in which he works. Baker essentially began his artistic endeavours in earnest in 1998. The prolific author has published eight books and countless poems published in leading publications in the medium of poetry.

== Translations ==
The novel was first published in Oriya in 2005 from Time Pass Publication, Bhubaneswar under the title Gambhiri Ghara and in 2007, it was translated into Bengali by Dilwar Hossain and Morshed Shafiul Hossain as Mithya Gerosthali (ISBN 984-404-287-9) and was published from Bangladesh by Anupam Prakashani, Dhaka. In 2008 it was published in English by Indian Age Communication, Vadodara, and was translated by Mahendra Kumar Dash. In 2010, Prameela K.P. translated it into Malayalam, and Chintha Publisher of Thiruvananthapuram published it with a title Irunda Koodaram. In 2011, the Hindi translation of the novel was published under the banner of Rajpal & Sons, Delhi with title Band Kamra (ISBN 978-81-7028-954-8).

== Sources ==
=== Print ===
==== Primary sources ====
- Sahoo, Sarojini. The Dark Abode( English),Indian AGE Communication, 2008. ISBN 978-81-906956-2-6
- Sahoo, Sarojini. Gambhiri Ghara, Time Pass Publication, Bhubaneswar, 2005
- Sahoo, Sarojini. Mithya Gerosthali (Bengali), Anupam Prakashani, Dhaka, Bangladesh, 2007. ISBN 984-404-287-9
- Sahoo, Sarojini. Irunda Koodaram( Malayalam). Chintha Publishers, 2009.

==== Secondary sources ====
- —. Vinjan Kairali:Malayalam Journal, September 2008 issue
- —. Shamakal:Bangladeshi News paper, 10 October 2008 issue
- —. Amritlok:Behgali Little Magazine, January 2009 issue

=== Online ===
- Red Room
- Sketch Book
- Thanal Online
- The Dark Abode
- Zone Magazine
- Pratham Alo
- The Daily Star
- Oriya Nari

== See also ==
- Sarojini Sahoo
- List of feminists
- List of feminist literature
- Sarojini Sahoo Stories
