= Vrinda Singh =

Indian female author

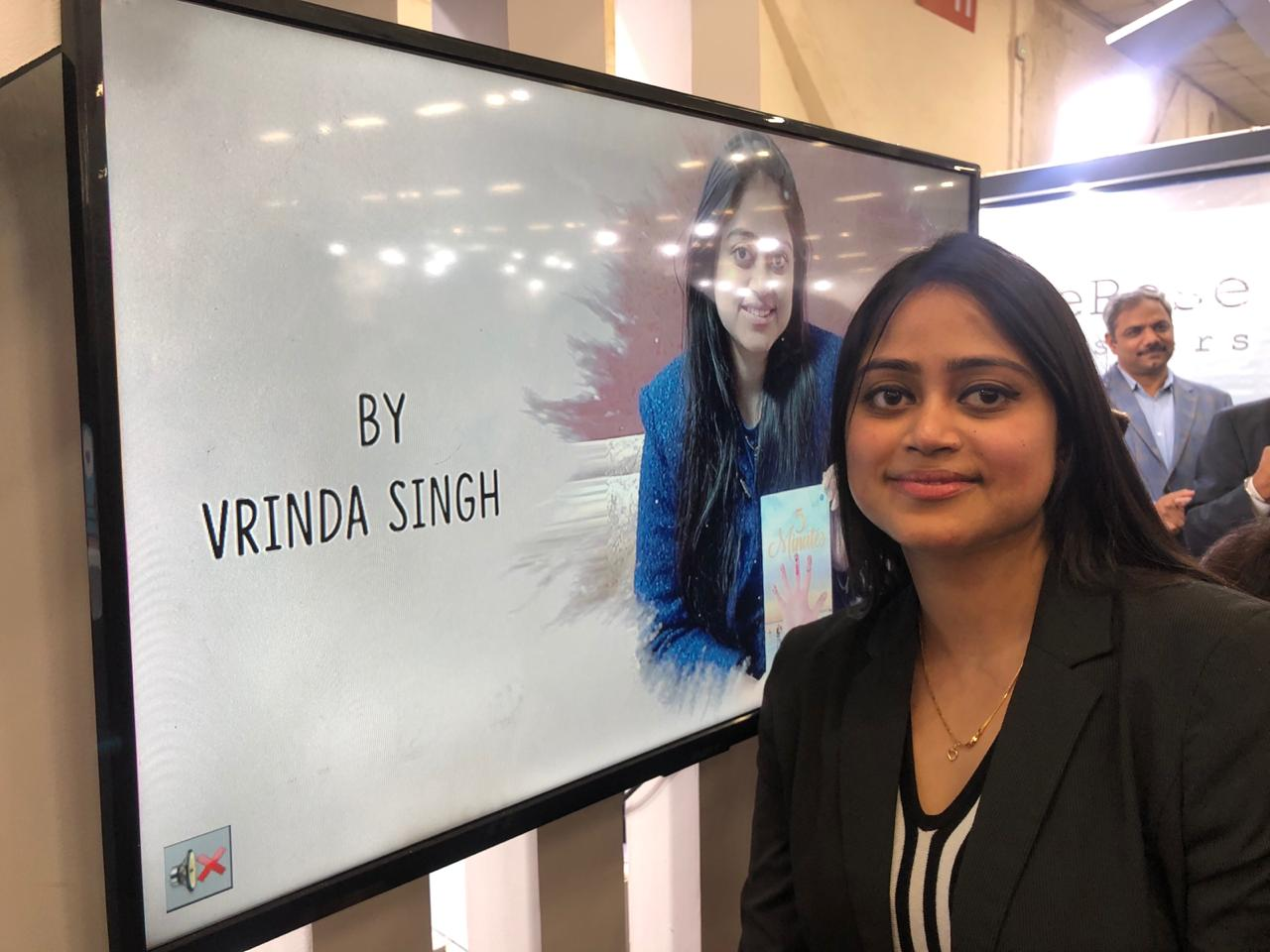
- Occupation: Writer
- Writing career
- Genre: Fiction

Vrinda Singh (वृंदा सिंह) is an Indian author. Both her books — Murky Girl and 5 Minutes — are based on themes focusing on women. Singh published Murky girl as her first book. She later published 5 minutes, a romantic thriller as her second work.

== Reception ==
Times of India critiqued her book:

Perhaps the ideas presented in the book are quite different; a part of their jolt is lost due to weak demonstration. The reader is made to straightaway deal with elements of pain without much warning. The book is presented without a foundation on what one has to follow and what should one expect."

T Rajkumari Sharma Tankha at New Indian Express said, "This book of over 16 chapters is a collection of real-life incidents. Its lucid and fast-paced style of writing keeps the reader hooked till the end" Vineet Sharan at Jagran wrote about Murky Girl, "(translated) The way Singh has written the book, it compels the reader to question the realities of this world. However, at many places, the characters don't come very strong. It is felt that the emotions of the characters had the potential to come out more vividly at some spots." Joshua Mark from Dajji World remarked "While Vrinda's ideas are powerful, the lack of appropriate pace in writing has hampered effective delivery. Sometimes, one may be compelled to reread the episode to check for its repetition.

Shraddha Kamdar from Femina reviewed, "Beginning with a bang, the book shows some promise as we follow Pooja from home to college, hostel and work life. While the author has tried hard to hold the reader’s interest, unfortunately a large part of the novel comes across as purposeless and without direction. The superficial way in which incidents are narrated and human reactions are portrayed does not arouse any empathy in the mind of the reader."
