= Mallika Yunis =

Indian writer

Mallika Yunis is an Indian writer who writes novels in Malayalam language. She is probably best known for her 1981 novel Upasana which won her the Maman Mappila literary award in 1982. The novel was made into a critically acclaimed film, titled Ente Upasana, by noted director Bharathan. The 2012 film Karpoora Deepam is also based on her novel. The film, which commenced production in 1998 was in a development hell for 14 years. In 2025, she received the Kerala Sahitya Akademi Award for Overall Contributions.

== Bibliography ==
=== Novels ===
- Upasana
- Varshameghangale Kaathirunnavar
- Nizhalchithrangal
- Vayalppoovu
- Anupallavi
- Nirabhedangal
- Ninakkai Mathram
- Pooppanthal
- Bhadrachitta
- Swapnangale Vida
- Idanaazhiyude Avasaanam
- Akale Neelaakasham
- Vazhithaarakal
- Nirabhedangal
- Swapnakku Sugamaanu
- Randamathoraal
- Sooryakireedom
- Safar
- Karpoora Deepam
- Samarpanam
