= Anupreeta Das =

Indian-American journalist

- Education: Boston University (Masters) London School of Economics (Masters)
- Occupations: journalist; author; editor

Anupreeta Das is an Indian-American journalist and author. She works at The New York Times based out of New Delhi as a South Asia correspondent.

She was previously the finance editor of The Times based in New York. Before that, she worked at The Wall Street Journal as a Deputy Business Editor and reporter.

== Education ==
Das has a master's degree in journalism from Boston University and a master's degree in International Relations from The London School of Economics and Political Science.

== Career ==
She was a freelance writer with the Christian Science Monitor and The Boston Globe before joining Reuters.

At the Journal, she co-authored articles on family offices, which are the "private investment firms of the extremely wealthy."

She joined The New York Times as a Finance Editor in 2020.

In 2024, she wrote about the wedding of Anant Ambani, the younger son of Mukesh Ambani.

Das is the author of the book Billionaire, Nerd, Savior, King: Bill Gates and His Quest to Shape Our World.

Felix Salmon reviewed the book for The Washington Post. Charlie English reviewed the book for The Guardian. The Economist reviewed the book. The book was long listed for The Financial Times and Schroders Best in Business 2024 award.

== Personal life ==
She has climbed Mount Kilimanjaro.
