= Ladies Coupé =

Novel by Anita Nair

Ladies Coupé is a novel by Anita Nair published in 2001. The novel follows the journey of a middle-aged Indian woman named Akhila as she travels to Kanyakumari in her search for independence and on the train's ladies coupe, swaps stories with 5 different women who inspire her to live her own life.

== Structure of Novel ==
Ladies Coupe is divided into a total of 11(10+1) chapters and among them the alternate chapters are unnamed. Akhila's chapters or her point of views and thoughts, alternate between the chapters of other five women. This helps the character of Akhila to think and to reflect about the life incidents she heard from her co-passengers. The last chapter is entitled as Akhila Speaks and it deals with the Akhila's decisions she made in her life after hearing and analysing the life stories of those five women.

The titles are given to alternate chapters, they are:

Chapter-2 : A Certain Age

Chapter-4 : Go, Grandmother, Go

Chapter-6 : Oil of Vitriol

Chapter-8 : Afloat

Chapter-10: Sister to Real Thing

Chapter-11: Akhila Speaks

== Plot ==
Akhilandeshwari or Akhila is a 45-year-old single Indian woman from a Tamil Brahmin family who works as an income tax clerk. She feels that she has never got the chance to live her own life, always fulfilling the roles of the daughter, sister, aunt and the provider. Until the day that she resolves to break free from her conservative Brahmin life and buys a one way train ticket to the sea side town of Kanyakumari to start a new life alone. During the process of her journey, she tries to find out an answer to the basic question which has been in pursuit throughout her life – ‘Can a woman stay single and be happy, or does a woman need a man to feel complete?'. She shares her ladies compartment (coupé) of the train with 5 different women:

- Janaki, a pampered wife and confused mother;
- Margaret Shanti, a chemistry teacher married to the poetry of elements and an insensitive tyrant too self-absorbed to recognize her needs;
- Prabha Devi, the perfect daughter and wife, transformed for life by a glimpse of a swimming pool;
- Fourteen-year-old Sheela, with her ability to perceive what others cannot;
- And Marikolanthu, whose innocence was destroyed by one night of lust.

Janaki, is portrayed as a happy woman, been taken care of by her father and brother in her parents’ house and in her marital life. She is a pampered wife who prefers to live only for husband. She is significant character in this novel by being a confused mother treating her children selfish; comparing them to her husband. She has developed a 'friendly' love with her husband. She used to stuck with the conventional role of women and she calls the home as the kingdom of women. She talks about a time when she felt a sudden disinterest about the same home and later she realises that, a woman is always a subordinate to man and she needs a man to complete her.

As they all swap stories on their lives, Akhila questions them of her eternal dilemma - whether a woman needs a man to complete her or whether she can stay single and happy? In the space of one night, the women change her life with their stories, while at the same time, reminding her to think for herself.
