= Atima Srivastava =

Atima Srivastava (born 1961 in Mumbai, India) is an author and director who lives in London. She has written short stories, authored six books, and has done multiple film directing and editing projects. Srivastava has won several awards for her work in film and literature. She also teaches and designs creative writing programs in universities throughout Europe.

== Early life and education ==
Atima Srivastava was born in Mumbai, India in 1961. When she was eight years old, she moved to London with her family, where she still lives today.

Srivastava attended the Moat Mount School, now the Mill Hill County High School, in the 1970s. In 1980 she entered the University of Essex where she earned her bachelor's degree in 1983.

== Career ==
=== Writing ===
Srivastava wrote her first novel, Transmission, in 1992. The semi-autobiographical story follows a young Anglo-Indian woman named Angie, who, much like Srivastava, works as a film producer. The book focuses on the relationships that Angie has with her parents, an old-fashioned and authoritarian Indian couple, and with Lol and Kathi, an HIV-positive couple about whom she wants to make a documentary and with whom she has a romantic affair. The title comes from the book's examination of several forms of transmission, the transmission of Indian culture and lifestyle into modern London and of sexually transmitted diseases.

In 2000 Srivastava published her second book, Looking for Maya. The plot tells of another young Anglo-Indian woman, Mira, who works as an author in London. Mira is forced to overcome issues of identity, love, tradition, and modernity as she attempts to find meaning while switching from one romantic entanglement to another. Both novels have protagonists who, instead of spiralling into an existential identity crisis over nationality and culture choose to focus on minor events in the characters' lives and their relation to a greater pursuit for love, success, and happiness.

Srivastava also written several short stories which have been published in anthologies such as New Writing 2001, Well-Sorted, and Tran-Lit.

Her third novel It Takes a Girl (1st in the series KILLER WOMEN) is available on Amazon in Paperback and Kindle, published February 14, 2023

"When a gangster is found floating in the Brook in a peaceful Asian neighbourhood in North London, the scandalous secrets of a family are set to explode. Shaani at 19 is faced with a situation that threatens to destroy everything: her brother’s glittering future, her mother’s mental health and the family’s spotless reputation. In her attempt to right the wrongs, she takes the biggest risk of her life. Will it pay off?" The lightness of touch in Srivastava’s writing style is in stark contrast to the tense and terrifying roller coaster of the story – making It Takes a Girl a stylish psychological noir thriller.

Her fourth novel Dark Waters (2nd in the series KILLER WOMEN) is available Amazon, in Paperback and Kindle, published June 8, 2023

"Kavya Sharma has it all. Unearned privilege and long legs, a good family, a beach house and a loving husband but she also has a chronic drink problem and resents being told off about it. Determined to take control of her situation, she spirals into a shapeless world inhabited by those who have murder in mind."

Her fifth novel The Crime She Didnt Commit(3rd in the series KILLER WOMEN) is available on Amazon, in Paperback and Kindle, published April 15, 2024

"Shivani Srivastava has designs on the eminent Dr Shree. She doesn’t realise that, though separated from his wife, he is still married. So, when the glamorous Mala Sinha returns and starts getting in the way of her plans, Shivani accidentally runs her over in a pique of jealous rage. At first panicked, Shivani's horror soon turns to high spirits as she realises it’s easy to get away with it. All she has to do is control the narrative. One by one, she tells them each a different lie and keeps all the plates spinning."

Her sixth novel (4th in the series KILLER WOMEN) is "A Fatal Friendship" available on Amazon, in Paperback and Kindle, published July 11, 2025

"Marina the wild spirited artist and Renu the quiet lonely housewife are the best of friends, but when Marina falls violently in love with a younger man and determines to do the worst thing Renu can imagine, their friendship is severely tested. Renu devises what she thinks will be a fool proof plan to protect her friend, but when the amateur sleuth Pallavi enters the scene and begins a cock-eyed investigation, things start to fall apart. It's enough to drive a woman to murder…" A riveting tale of love and loyalty, and a femme fatale with a deadly secret.

=== Film and theatre ===
From 1985 - 1999 Srivastava worked as a film editor and director for shows including A Week in Politics, Dispatches and London Zoo Story. In 1993 she worked on several series of Moving Pictures which is a journalism series reporting on global cinema. She also has written three TV-movie screenplays, Dancing in the Dark and The Legendary Vindaloo for Channel 4, and Camden Story for the BBC. In addition, the National Theatre Company commissioned her to write a play titled Why Not Love? which premiered in 2001.

=== Teaching ===
Srivastava has done a significant amount of work as a lecturer and curriculum designer for both British and European universities. In 2000 she worked as a lecturer at the New York University-London program where she taught creative writing and at CAPA International Education where she taught a course called Writing the City in addition to creative writing. She also taught various writing and film technique and development courses at IES Abroad between 2002 and 2007 and taught creative writing at the University of Greenwich from 2007 to 2009. Her books have been studied at universities in Poland, Spain, and Russia.

She was also the British author-in-residence at the Universities of Singapore, Sophia in Bulgaria, Mumbai, Berne, Cologne, Mainz, Ewha in Seoul, Connecticut College (USA) and Warwick University.

== Awards ==
Srivastava has won several awards for film and literature. She won the Bridgeport Short Story Prize in 1994 for her short story Dragons in E8. She has won two Arts Council Writers' Awards, one in 1998 for her book Looking for Maya, and one in 2000 for her unreleased third book. Also in 2000 she received the Hawthornden Fellowship and was a finalist at the London Writers' Competition.
