= Sumati Kshetramade =

Marathi writer

Sumati Kshetramade (7 March 1913 – 1997) was an India Marathi writer from Maharashtra.

A major theme of her novels is the exploitation of women.

Kshetramade was a physician by profession.

== Selected works ==
=== Novels ===
- Shrāvaṇadhārā (1983)
- Pratipadā (1982)
- Makhamalī Baṭavā (1979)
- Āshāḍh Megh (1976)
- Sharvari Sharvari
- Yugandharā
- Ābhās
- Mahāshwetā
- Anuhār
- Wrundā
- Yādnyaseni
- Sāmbarāchi Shinge
- Jiwan-Swapna
