= Sarojini Sahoo =

Indian (Odia) Writer

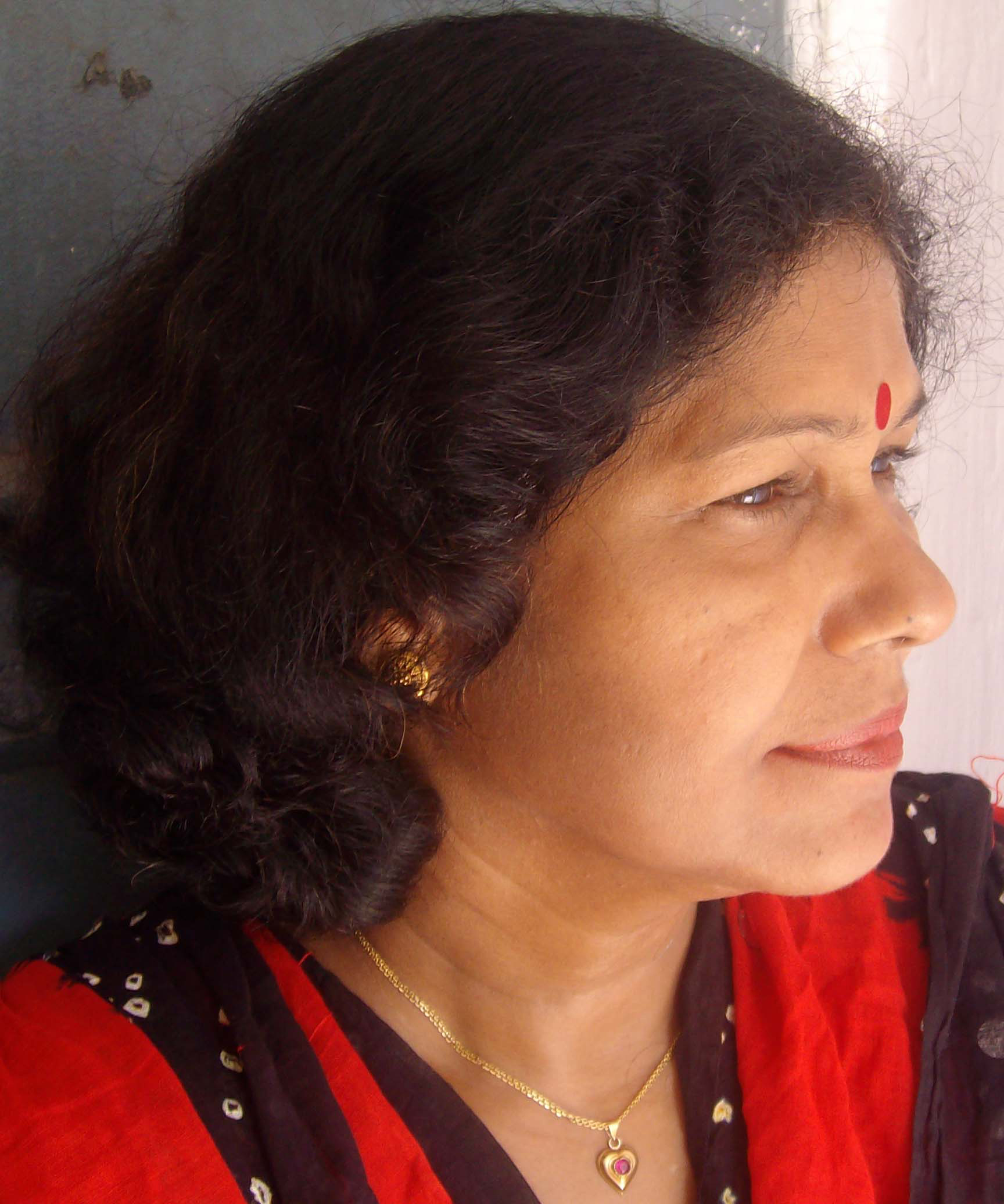
- Sarojini Sahoo
- Born: 4 January 1956 (age 70); Dhenkanal, Orissa (now Odisha), India
- Occupations: Novelist; Short story writer; poet; essayist; academician

Sarojini Sahoo (born 4 January 1956) is an Indian feminist writer, a columnist in The New Indian Express and an associate editor of Chennai-based English magazine Indian AGE. She is listed as one of the 25 Exceptional Women of India by Kindle Magazine of Kolkata in 2010, and is an Odisha Sahitya Academy Award winner.

== Life ==
Born in the small town of Dhenkanal in Odisha (India), Sahoo earned her MA and PhD degrees in Odia Literature and a Bachelor of Law from Utkal University. She now teaches at a degree college in Belpahar, Jharsuguda, Odisha.

She is the second daughter of Ishwar Chandra Sahoo and the late Nalini Devi and is married to Jagadish Mohanty, a veteran writer of Odisha. She has a son and a daughter.

== Fictions ==
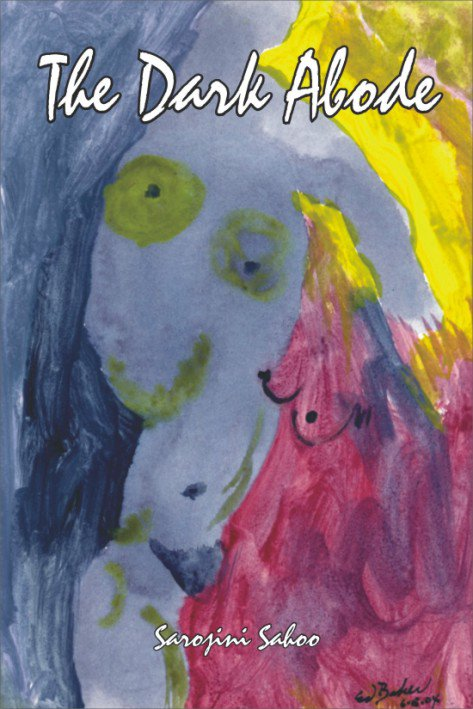
The Dark Abode cover

Her novel Gambhiri Ghara was commercially successful in Odia literature. Her novels have gained a reputation for their feminist outlook and sexual frankness and have been translated into English and published from India under the title The Dark Abode (2008) (ISBN 978-81-906956-2-6) and published from Bangladesh in Bengali as Mithya Gerosthali ( 2007 ) (ISBN 984 404 287-9). Prameela K.P has translated this novel into Malayalam and has been published as "Irunda Koodaram" by Chintha Publishers, Thiruvananthapuram. Martina Fuchs for German and Dinesh Kumar Mali for Hindi. Another novel Pakhibas has been translated into Bengali and published from Bangladesh under the same title in 2009. This novel has been translated into Hindi by Dinesh Kumar Mali and has been published with same title by Yash Publication, Delhi (ISBN 81-89537-45-8) in 2010. Also, Dinesh Kumar Mali translated two more novel in Hindi titled बंद कमरा and विशादेश्वरी published from Rajpal and Sons, New Delhi and Yash publication, New Delhi. The same translator had translated सरोजिनी साहू की दलित कहानियाँ and रेप तथा अन्य कहानियां published from Yash publication, New Delhi as well as Rajpal and Sons, New Delhi.

== Essays ==
She has published a collection of essays titled 'Sensible Sensuality (2010). The book discusses femininity from an Eastern perspective, exploring the role of sexuality within Eastern feminism. Sahoo argues that feminism should challenge social structures rather than oppose men individually, asserting that traditional gender roles restrict both men and women.

Sahoo's writings frequently address female sexuality, relationships, and the experiences of women within traditional societies. Her perspectives on feminism and her rejection of Simone De Beauvoir's 'the other' theory have led to her inclusion among the "25 Exceptional Women of India" by Kindle Magazine.

== Thoughts and themes ==
=== Feminism ===
Associated with contemporary feminism in Indian literature, she has stated that her approach to feminism focuses on an integral part of femaleness rather than a confrontation with male hegemony, arguing that men and women share a basic human equality despite constitutional differences.

Her fiction recurrently addresses themes related to female sexuality and societal experiences, including adolescence, pregnancy, rape, and social stigma.

Her work links feminism to sexual politics, advocating against restrictions on female sexual expression and identifying sexual liberation as a central element of the women's movement. In South Asian Outlook, an e-magazine published from Canada, Menka Walia writes: "Sahoo typically evolves her stories around Indian women and sexuality, which is something not commonly written about, but is rather discouraged in a traditionalist society. As a feminist, she advocates women's rights and usually gives light to the injustices Eastern women face. In her interviews, she usually talks about the fact that women are second-class citizens in India, backing up these facts with examples of how love marriages are forbidden, the rejection of divorces, the unfairness of dowries, and the rejection of female politicians." Her novels, including Upanibesh, Pratibandi, and Gambhiri Ghara, address themes ranging from sexuality and philosophy to domestic and international politics. According to American journalist Linda Lowen, Sarojini Sahoo has written extensively as an Indian feminist about the interior lives of women and how their burgeoning sexuality is seen as a threat to traditional patriarchal societies. Sarojini's novels and short stories treat women as sexual beings and probe culturally sensitive topics such as rape, abortion and menopause – from a female perspective.

=== Sexuality ===
Simone De Beauvoir, in her book The Second Sex, first elaborately described the gender role and problem away from biological differences. In Odia literature, Sahoo's fiction frequently addresses themes of sexuality and feminism.

Her novel Upanibesh explores themes of female sexuality through its protagonist, Medha, a bohemian character who challenges traditional societal expectations regarding marriage and relationships.

Her novel Pratibandi centers on Priyanka, a protagonist living in a remote village who begins a relationship with an older, former Member of Parliament.

In her novel Gambhiri Ghara, she describes an unusual relationship between two people: a Hindu housewife of India and a Muslim artist of Pakistan. It is a net-oriented novel. A woman meets a very sexually experienced man. One day he asks if she had any such experience. The woman, Kuki, scolds him and insults him by calling him a caterpillar. She said without love, lust is like hunger of a caterpillar. Gradually they become involved with love, lust, and spiritually. That man considers her as his daughter, lover, mother, and above all these, as a Goddess. They both madly love each other, through the Internet and on the phone. They use obscene language and they kiss each other online. Kuki does not lead a happy conjugal life though she has a love marriage with Aniket. But the novel is not limited to only a love story.

It has a greater aspect. It deals with the relationship between State and individual. Safique is not a Muslim by temperament, but as a historian, thinks the Pakistan of today has separated itself from its roots and looks towards Arabian legends for his history. He protests that the syllabus of history for the school would start from seventh century A.D., not from the Mahenjodaro and Harappa. Safique was once arrested after the bomb blast of London for allegation of being associated with the terrorist, but is it a fact? Later Kuki learned that Safiques is trapped by a military junta. The ex-lover of Safique's wife had retaliated against Safique by arresting him with an allegation of terrorism.

== Awards ==
- Odisha Sahitya Academy Award, 1993
- Jhankar Award, 1992
- Bhubaneswar Book Fair Award, 1993
- Prajatantra Award, 1981,1993
- Ladli Media Award, 2011

== Selected bibliography ==
=== Novels ===
- Upanibesh (1998)
- Pratibandi (1999) ISBN 81-7411-253-7
- Swapna Khojali Mane (2000)
- Mahajatra (2001)
- Gambhiri Ghara (2005)
- Bishad Ishwari (2006)
- Pakshibasa (2007)
- Asamajik (2008)

=== Short stories ===
She has published ten anthologies of short stories.

Her English anthologies of short stories are:

- Sarojini Sahoo Stories (2006) ISBN 81-89040-26-X
- Waiting for Manna (2008) ISBN 978-81-906956-0-2

Her some of short stories have been anthologised in Hindi:

- Rape Tatha Anya Kahaniyana (2010) ISBN 978-81-7028-921-0

Some of her short stories have also been anthologized into Bengali:

- Dukha Aprimita(2012) is one of her Bengali version of short stories, translated by Arita Bhoumik Adhikari and published from Bangladesh.

Her other Odia anthologies of short stories are:

- Sukhara Muhanmuhin (1981)
- Nija GahirareNije (1989)
- Amrutara Pratikshare (1992)
- Chowkath (1994)
- Tarali Jauthiba Durga (1995)
- Deshantari (1999)
- Dukha Apramita (2006)
- Srujani Sarojini (2008)

== See also ==
- List of Indian writers

== Sources ==
=== Print ===
==== Primary sources ====
- Sahoo, Sarojini. Sarojini Sahoo Short Stories. Grassroots, 2006. ISBN 81-89040-26-X
- Sahoo, Sarojini. Waiting for Manna, Indian AGE Communication, 2008. ISBN 978-81-906956-0-2
- Sahoo, Sarojini. The Dark Abode, Indian AGE Communication, 2008. ISBN 978-81-906956-2-6
- Sahoo, Sarojini. Mithya Gerosthali, Anupam Prakashani, Dhaka, Bangladesh, 2007. ISBN 984-404-287-9
- Sukhara Muhanmuhin (1981)
- NijaGahirareNije (1989)
- Amrutara Pratikshare (1992)
- Chowkath (1994)
- Tarali Jauthiba Durga (1995)
- Upanibesh (1998)
- Pratibandi (1999)
- Gambhiri Ghara (2005)

==== Secondary sources ====
- Oriya Women's Writing : Paul St-Pierre and Ganeswar Mishra, Sateertha Publication, ISBN 81-900749-0-3
- The Amari Gapa (Odia Literary Journal), Special Issue on Sarojini: May–July 2006
