= Neel Kamal Puri =

Indian author

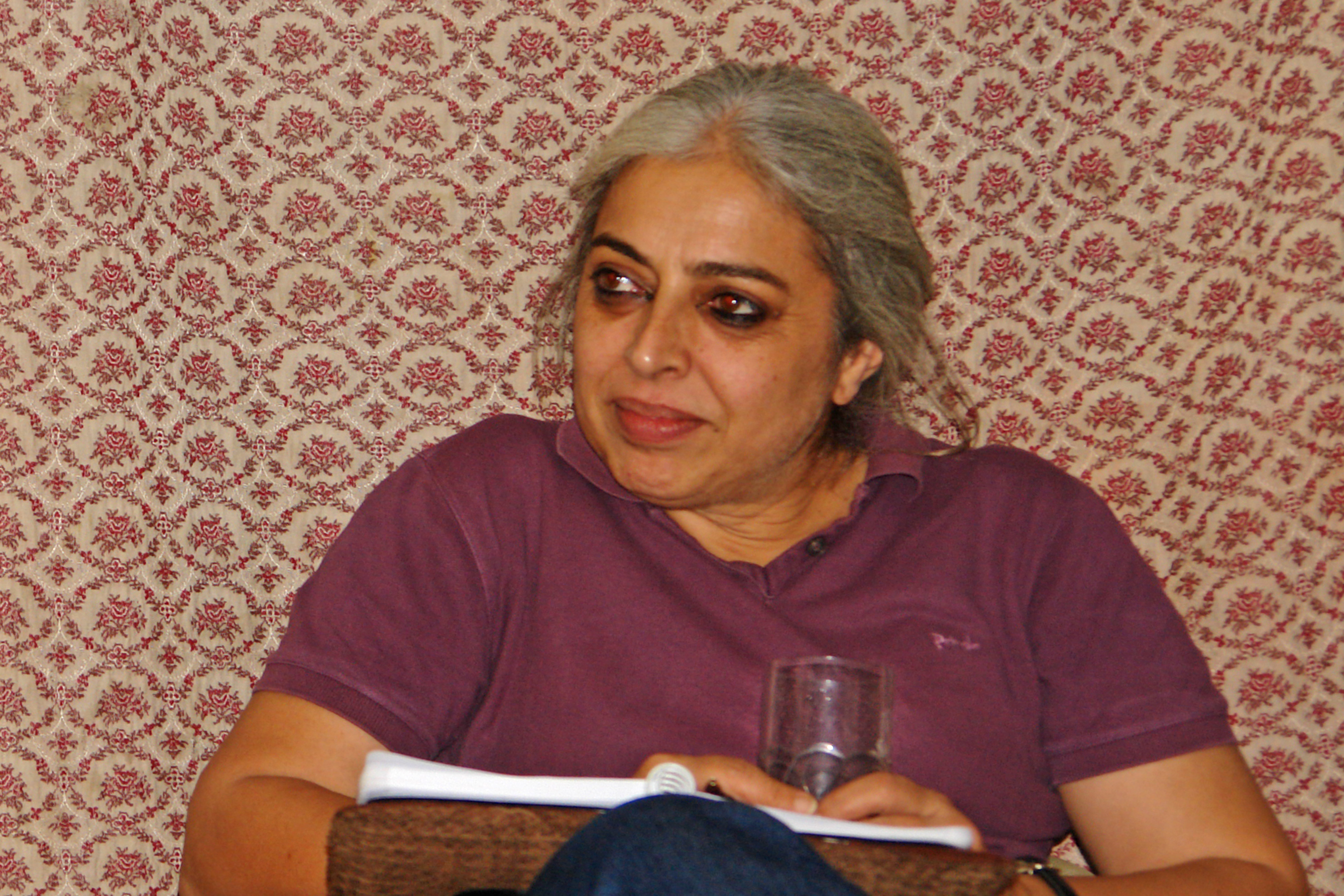
- In Ludhiana, September 2006
- Born: 14 February 1956; Ludhiana, Punjab, India
- Education: Yadavindra Public School
- Occupation: Writer

Neelkamal Puri (born 14 February 1956) is an Indian author, columnist and a college teacher.

== Early life ==
Born in Ludhiana, Punjab, she grew up in the princely state of Patiala, where she did her schooling from the Yadavindra Public School. She was one of the first 30 girls to be admitted to the school, the school being boys only before that. Since 1979, she has worked as a lecturer in English Literature at different colleges in Patiala and Chandigarh. She is currently teaching Literature and Media Studies at the Government College for Girls, Chandigarh.

== Books ==
Neelkamal Puri has written two novels, The Patiala Quartet published by Penguin India and Remember to Forget published by Rupa Publications. Noted writer Khushwant Singh described The Patiala Quartet as among the best works of English fiction written by a Punjabi. After these stories based in cities she was born in and the city she grew up in, Neelkamal Puri is working next on a collection of short stories Theka Tales.
