= Madhuri R. Shah =

Indian educationist, writer

- Born: 13 December 1919; Ranpur, Gujarat, India
- Died: 29 June 1989 (aged 69)
- Occupations: Educationist, writer
- Known for: Educational service
- Awards: Padma Shri

Madhuri Ratilal Shah (13 December 1919 – 29 June 1989) was an Indian educationist and writer.

== Early life ==
She was born in Ranpur.

== Career ==
She was the chairperson of the University Grants Commission, and the chairperson of the UGC Review Committee on University System set up in 1985. She also worked as the Education Officer of the Mumbai Municipal Corporation.

Madhuri Shah authored many books on education and poetry, including Without Women, No Development: Selected Case Studies from Asia of Nonformal Education for Women, Towards exploring some aspects of the relationship between education and creation of employment opportunities, Symphony: A Book of Poems Challenges to Higher Education in a Changing India, Instruction in education: Teaching technology and a series by name, Radiant English Workbook are some of her notable works.

== Awards and honours ==
She was awarded the fourth highest Indian civilian award of Padma Shri by the Government of India in 1977.

== Legacy ==
Her life was documented in the book, Harmony: glimpses in the life of Madhuri R. Shah, published in 1985, containing several of her interviews.
