= Shweta Taneja =

- Born: New Delhi, India
- Occupations: Novelist, graphic novelist, journalist
- Writing career
- Period: 2012 -
- Genres: Fantasy, Solarpunk
- Website: shwetawrites.com

Shweta Taneja is an Indian author of novels, short fiction, graphic novels, nonfiction and comic books. Her work includes fantasy fiction series The Rakta Queen: An Anantya Tantrist Mystery, The Matsya Curse: An Anantya Tantrist Mystery, Cult of Chaos: An Anantya Tantrist Mystery and books for YA and children including The Ghost Hunters of Kurseong and How to Steal a Ghost @ Manipal.

Her short story "The Daughter That Bleeds" was published in Best Asian Speculative Fiction and won the Editor's Choice Award. The story was translated into French under the title La Fille qui saigne, published in Galaxies magazine and was a finalist in the Grand Prix de l’Imaginaire Awards for 2020 in France.

She wrote the scripts for The Skull Rosary, a five-story graphic novel involving the Hindu god Shiva (published by Holy Cow Entertainment) and Krishna: Defender of Dharma, about the Hindu god Krishna (published by Campfire Graphic Novels). She currently lives and works in Bangalore, India.

== Biography ==
Shweta Taneja grew up in Delhi, India. She earned a master's degree in English Literature from the Lady Shri Ram College for Women, University of Delhi and a Masters in Fashion Communication from the National Institute of Fashion Technology.

== Writing career ==
Taneja's journalist career began with the magazines Femina and Men's Health (where she was the Assistant Editor of the India edition). She continues to write for several print and online publications including Mint, Discover India, Scroll and The Huffington Post (India).

Her first publication was the Krishna: Defender of Dharma, a graphic novel about the Hindu god, for which she wrote the script and collaborated with illustrator Rajesh Nagulakonda. In 2013, the graphic novel was recommended for Classes 7 and 8 for schools affiliated to the Central Board of Secondary Education, India by the Association of Writers & Illustrators for Children.

The Ghost Hunters of Kurseong was her first novel. It involves a group of twelve-year-olds who solve a mystery in the hill town Kurseong in India. Taneja promoted the novel using a children's detective workshop. Groups of children would solve a mystery within a given time and then draw out their version of the events

The Skull Rosary was Taneja's second graphic novel. She wrote the script and collaborated with five different illustrators for each of the five stories in the novel. It was nominated for Best Writer and Best Cover for the Comic Con India awards 2013.

Her next work was Cult of Chaos: An Anantya Tantrist Mystery which is a detective fantasy novel based in Delhi, India. The protagonist of Cult of Chaos is Anantya who is a woman tantrist - a practitioner of Tantra. Cult of Chaos is billed as India's first tantic-detective novel. The novel was launched with a quiz on paranormal and supernatural beliefs in India.

In 2016, Taneja published How to Steal a Ghost @ Manipal which is as described by The Asian Age as "A young student turns into a paranormal investigator to impress her boyfriend." The book is published in an ebook format by Juggernaut Books and it was the Taneja's foray into becoming a hybrid author. Her second novel of the Anantya Tantrist Mystery series, The Matsya Curse, was published in 2017. The third novel of the Anantya Tantrist Mystery series, The Rakta Queen, was published in 2018.

In 2016, Taneja was selected for the Charles Wallace India Fellowship (Chichester University, UK). In 2020, Taneja's short story was a finalist in the French Grand Prix de l’Imaginaire Awards 2020. The short story is about a dystopian future in India where fertile women are treated as commodities. In 2021 she published a children science book They Found What?/They Made What?.

== Bibliography ==
=== Novels ===
| Name | Type | Publication year | Publisher | ISBN |
|---|---|---|---|---|
| The Rakta Queen: An Anantya Tantrist Mystery | Novel | 2018 | HarperCollins | 978-9353023294 |
| The Matsya Curse: An Anantya Tantrist Mystery | Novel | 2017 | HarperCollins | 978-9352645022 |
| Cult of Chaos: An Anantya Tantrist Mystery | Novel | 2014 | HarperCollins | 978-9351364443 |

=== Children's books and young adult ===
| Name | Type | Publication year | Publisher | ISBN |
|---|---|---|---|---|
| They Found What?/They Made What? | Science | 2021 | Hachette India | 978-9389253979 |
| How to Steal a Ghost @ Manipal | Novel | 2016 | Juggernaut Books | |
| The Ghost Hunters of Kurseong | Novel | 2013 | Hachette | 978-9350095539 |

=== Graphic novels ===
| Name | Type | Publication year | Publisher | ISBN |
|---|---|---|---|---|
| The Skull Rosary | Graphic novel | 2013 | Holy Cow Entertainment | ASIN: B00HNSSUDQ |
| Krishna: Defender of Dharma | Graphic novel | 2012 | Campfire Graphic Novels | 978-9380741710 |

=== Short stories ===
- "The Songs That Humanity Lost Reluctantly to Dolphins", (Part of an anthology titled Multispecies Cities: Solarpunk Urban), World Weaver Press, April 2021
- "The Biryani Choke", Eleven Stops to the Present: Stories of Bengaluru (2020)
- "Les Chants que L’Humanité abandonna aux" (translated by Thomas Bauduret), Galaxies No 66 (2020)
- "La Fille qui saigne" (translated by Mikael Cabon), Galaxies No 58 (2019)
- "Grandma Garam's Kitty Party", Magical Women edited by Sukanya Venkatraghavan (Hachette India, 2019)
- "Agni's Tattoo", Whose Future is It?", Cellarius Stories (Genesis Thought, 2018)
- "The Daughter That Bleeds", The Best Asian Speculative Fiction (Kitaab, 2018)
- "It's a Dog's Death" (comic with Vivek Goel), Were House (Holy Cow Entertainment, 2013)
- "Terror Strikes Back", Celebrate Holi (Hachette India, 2013)
