= Anuttama Banerjee =

Indian Psychologist

- Occupations: Psychologist, poet, author

Anuttama Banerjee is an Indian psychologist, poet, author, and public health advocate. A Bengali from West Bengal, she completed her PhD in Clinical Psychology from Calcutta University. She completed further training in psychoanalysis from the Indian Psychoanalytic Society.

Specializing in the areas of Relationship, Intimacy and Sexuality, Banerjee has long been a prominent voice in promoting mental health in Bengali media. To this end, she contributes frequently to print media and electronic media, and she also runs an active social media presence across YouTube, Facebook, Twitter etc.

== Childhood and personal life ==
Anuttama Banerjee is a prominent personality hailing from North Kolkata, known for her rich cultural lineage. Her mother gained fame as a renowned singer and lecturer. Following her schooling, Anuttama Banerjee pursued her academic journey in Psychology from Calcutta University. Renowned for her melodious voice, Anuttama Banerjee has also garnered acclaim for her vocal performances.

== Works ==
Anuttama is also a published poet. Among her books are:

- Margin theke bichyuto (মার্জিন থেকে বিচ্যুত)
- Utshaho nei ongikarey (উৎসাহ নেই অঙ্গীকারে)
- Aguner brotochari (আগুনের ব্রতচারী)
- Kobitar moto hoyni (কবিতার মতো হয়নি)
- ‘Saptapatalbhedi (সপ্তপাতালভেদী)
- Onushongo (অনু-সঙ্গ)
