= The Better Man (novel) =

Novel by Anita Nair

The Better Man is a 2000 novel by Anita Nair. It is set in the southern part of Kerala, India, a region known as Malabar under the British Raj.

== Plot ==
Mukundan, retired from government service, returns to the village of Kaikurussi where he was born. He is upset, viewing his life as a failure. He meets "One-screw-loose-Bhasi", a local eccentric, a housepainter and an inventor of an odd system of alternative medicine. He helps Mukundan transform himself.

Then Power House Ramakrishnan, a locally important man, decides to build a Community hall, and selects Bhasi's land. He threatens to destroy Bhasi's business if he refuses to sell the land. Mukundan intends to save Bhasi's land but is flattered into accepting membership on the project committee.

Then Mukundan's father dies, and he undergoes a deeper transformation.

== Critical reaction ==
Dhanyasree M, writing in OneIndia, says "A tone of wistful melancholy and incidents with a touch of keenly observed comedy makes the characterization in this novel more special. Her vivid knowledge on the pulse of Kerala can be well observed in this novel. This novel is a must read for anyone who wants to know the true pulse of Indian life."

Kit Reed, writing in The New York Times, says "A genial, meandering tale filled with false alarms and diversions, The Better Man is slowed by loops in the story, by abandoned threads of plot. Charming as it is, the novel gathers momentum only at the end, when Bhasi and Mukundan find themselves at odds just in time for the drama of conflict and resolution." Kirkus Reviews writes, "Nair's prose can tend to the purple; her strength lies in gentle, keenly observed comedy rather than tearful melodrama," and describes the work as "Overall, a warmly affecting novel whose depiction of small-town life strikes a universal chord."

The Literary Review column of The Hindu said "The Better Man had all the right ingredients according to the critics. Today, with her second book Ladies Coupe, one would imagine ANITA NAIR would have achieved the same results. Critics have opined otherwise..."

Another review in The Hindu said "Anita Nair's first book, The Better Man, was a finely structured novel set in a small Kerala village. Mukundan, her hero, returns to the village, hoping to exorcise bitter memories. Anita Nair not only has a wonderful knowledge of life in the village, but shows an almost Dostoevskian feeling for the undercurrents of consciousness, as Mukundan seeks and finds redemption."
