= Anita Nair =

English-language Indian novelist

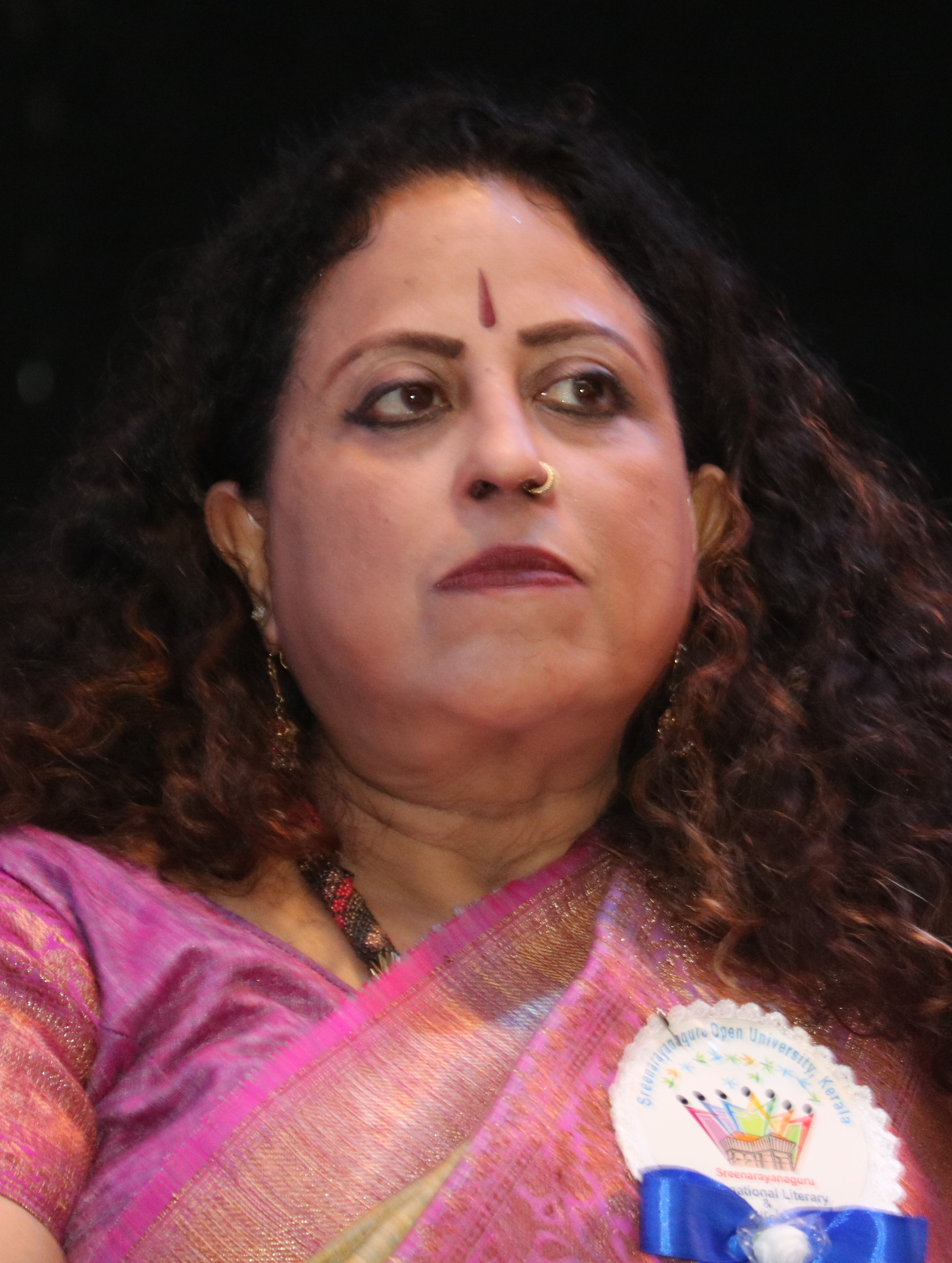
- Anita Nair
- Born: 26 January 1966 (age 60); Shoranur, Kerala, India
- Education: B.A (English Literature)
- Alma mater: NSS College, Ottapalam, Kerala; Virginia Center for the Creative Arts
- Occupation: Writer
- Known for: The Better Man; Ladies Coupé; Lessons in Forgetting; Cut Like Wound

Anita Nair (born 26 January 1966) is an Indian novelist who writes her books in English. She is best known for her novels A Better Man, Mistress, and Lessons in Forgetting. She has also written poetry, essays, short stories, crime fiction, historical fiction, romance, and children's literature, including Muezza and Baby Jaan: Stories from the Quran.

== Early life and education ==
Nair was born in Shoranur in Palakkad district of Kerala. Nair was educated in Chennai (Madras) before returning to Kerala, where she gained a BA in English Language and Literature.

== Career ==
Nair was working as the creative director of an advertising agency in Bangalore when she wrote her first book, a collection of short stories called Satyr of the Subway, which she sold to Har-Anand Press. The book won her a fellowship from the Virginia Center for the Creative Arts.

Among Nair's early commercial works were pieces she penned in the late 1990s for The Bangalore Monthly magazine (now called Explocity Bangalore), published by Explocity in a column titled 'The Economical Epicurean'.

Thereafter followed Nair's novel The Better Man (2000) which was also published in Europe and the United States. In 2002, Ladies Coupé was elected as one of the five best in India. The novel is about women's conditions in a male dominated society, told with great insight, solidarity and humour. Nair's novels The Better Man and Ladies Coupé have been translated into 21 languages. Her 2018 novel Eating Wasps is an update to Ladies Coupé.

In 2002, her debut collection of poems Malabar Mind was published, and in 2003 Where the Rain is Born – Writings about Kerala which she has edited.

Nair has also written The Puffin Book of Myths and Legends (2004), a children's book on myths and legends.

Nair's writings about Kerala and her poetry has been included in The Poetry India Collection and a British Council Poetry Workshop Anthology. Her poems appeared in The Dance of the Peacock: An Anthology of English Poetry from India, featuring 151 Indian English poets, edited by Vivekanand Jha and published by Hidden Brook Press, Canada.

Nair has also written other books, such as Mistress (2003), Adventures of Nonu, the Skating Squirrel (2006), Living Next Door to Alise (2007) and Magical Indian Myths (2008). Nair's works also include many travelogues. With the play Nine Faces of Being, she became a playwright, adapting the script from her book Mistress Her book Cut Like Wound (2012) introduced the fictional character Inspector Gowda. The second book in the series Chain of Custody was published in 2015. Other works by Nair include The Lilac House (2012) and Alphabet Soup for Lovers (2016).

Her sixth novel Idris: Keeper of The Light (2014) is a historical and geographical novel about a Somali trader who visited Malabar in 1659 AD.

She has also written several audiobooks, including A Field of Flowers (2021) and Little Duck Girl, narrated by Prakash Raj. Twin Beds was voiced by Konkona Sen Sharma and Satyadeep Mishra, and she voiced the audiobooks Why I Killed My Husband and Satyr of the Subway.

In January 2022, Anita Nair was interviewed for the podcast, The Literary City with Ramjee Chandran.

== Awards and recognitions ==
- Arch of Excellence Award by the All India Achievers' Conference, New Delhi for Literature
- 2007 LiBeraturpreis, finalist, Germany.
- 2008 FLO FICCI Women Achievers Award, for literature
- 2009 Montblanc honored her with the launch of the Special Edition writing instrument in India; for her novel contribution to literature, enforcing cross cultural endeavors and enlightening experiences that have transcended an inexhaustible diversity of forms – barriers of language, cultures and identities.
- 2012 Kerala Sahitya Akademi Award for her contribution to literature and culture
- 2013 Bal Sahitya Puraskar for her total contribution to Children's Literature
- 2014 The Hindu Literary Prize shortlist for Idris Keeper of the Light
- 2015 Global Ambassador for Women for Expo May
- 2017 Crossword Book Award, Jury Award, Children's category, Muezza and Baby Jaan
- 2020 UNHCR appointment as a high-profile supporter

== Bibliography ==
- Satyr of the Subway & Eleven Other Stories 1997, ISBN 9780143099659, OCLC 77058678
- The Better Man New Delhi; London : Penguin Books, 1999. ISBN 9780140293203, OCLC 59457810
- Ladies Coupé 2001. ISBN 9780099428978, OCLC 896652584
- Malabar Mind – Poetry Calicut : Yeti Books, 2002. ISBN 9788188330003, OCLC 52326380
- Where the Rain is Born – Writings about Kerala (Editor) 2003 ISBN 9789351183501
- Puffin Book of World Myths and Legends 2004 ISBN 9780143335870
- Mistress 2005. ISBN 9780144000333, OCLC 85772121
- Adventures of Nonu, the Skating Squirrel 2006. ISBN 9788129108920, OCLC 70063316
- Living Next Door To Alise 2007. ISBN 9780143333999, OCLC 922918137
- Magical Indian Myths 2008. ISBN 9780143330042, OCLC 995509060
- Goodnight & God Bless 2008. ISBN 9780670081516, OCLC 732686957
- Lessons in Forgetting 2010. ISBN 9788172239046, OCLC 731240004
- Chemmeen' (Translator) 2011
- Cut Like Wound – Literary noir 2012. ISBN 9789350293805, OCLC 824683061
- The Lilac House: a novel New York : St. Martin's Griffin, 2012. ISBN 9781250005182, OCLC 740628497
- Idris – Historical novel 2014. ISBN 9789350297810, OCLC 899740186
- Alphabet soup for lovers, Noida, Uttar Pradesh, India: HarperCollins Publishers India, 2015. ISBN 9789351774822, OCLC 933430829
- Chain of custody : an inspector Gowda novel, Noida : Harper Black, 2016. ISBN 9789351778073, OCLC 954424570/
- Eating Wasps, Context, 2018

== Personal life ==
She lives in Bangalore with her husband, Suresh Parambath and a son.
