= 1777 in poetry =

List of years in poetry	(table)
- … 1767; 1768; 1769; 1770; 1771; 1772; 1773; 1774; 1775; 1776; 1777; 1778; 1779; 1780; 1781; 1782; 1783; 1784; 1785; 1786; 1787 …
- In literature 1774 1775 1776 1777 1778 1779 1780
- Art; Archaeology; Architecture; Literature; Music; Philosophy; Science; +...

Nationality words link to articles with information on the nation's poetry or literature (for instance, Irish or France).

== Events ==
- March 1 (Saint David's Day) – Welsh ship's surgeon David Samwell, on board HMS Resolution in the Pacific Ocean on the second voyage of James Cook, writes a penillion.

== Works published ==
=== United Kingdom ===
- Thomas Chatterton, Poems, Supposed to Have Been Written at Bristol, by Thomas Rowley, and Others, in the Fifteenth Century, published anonymously, edited by Thomas Tyrwhitt; published February 8 (see also Tyrwhitt, A Vindication 1782)
- William Combe:
  - The Diaboliad, published anonymously, misdated "1677"; directed at Simon, Lord Irnham
  - The First of April; or, The Triumphs of Folly
- Thomas Day, The Desolation of America, published anonymously
- William Dodd, Thoughts in Prison
- William Roscoe, Mount Pleasant, published anonymously
- Thomas Warton, the younger, Poems: A new edition
- Paul Whitehead, Poems and Miscellaneous Compositions

=== United States ===
- Anonymous, Song: made on the taking of General Burgoyne, a broadside of 21 four-line verses, published with no information on the place or printer
- Anonymous ("H. I."), Faction: a sketch; or, a summary of the causes of the present most unnatural and indefensible of all rebellion's (sic), "Written at New-York, February, 1776", published this year in New York, 8 pages
- Thomas Dawes, The Law Given at Sinai
- Francis Hopkinson, "Camp Ballad"

=== Other ===
- Solomon Gessner, works, German-language, Switzerland; in two volumes, published this year and in 1777
- Pierre Le Tourneur, Poésies galliques, translation into French from the original English of James Macpherson's Ossian poems

== Births ==
Death years link to the corresponding "[year] in poetry" article:

- January 27 – Lukijan Mušicki (died 1837), Serbian poet, prose writer and polyglot
- March 14 – John Blair Linn (died 1804), American
- July 27 – Thomas Campbell (died 1844), Scottish poet especially of sentimental poetry dealing with human affairs
- December 2 – Hendrik Doeff (died 1837), the first westerner to write haiku in Japanese

== Deaths ==
Birth years link to the corresponding "[year] in poetry" article:

- January 30 – Justus Friedrich Wilhelm Zachariae (born 1726), German writer, translator, editor and composer
- February 3 – Hugh Kelly (born 1739), Irish poet and dramatist
- March 2 – Horace Walpole, Earl of Oxford (born 1717), English art historian, man of letters, antiquarian and politician
- August 26 – Francis Fawkes (born 1720), English poet and translator
- September 24 (bur.) – James Fortescue (born 1716), English
- October 12 (October 1 O.S.) – Alexander Sumarokov (born 1717), Russian poet and dramatist
- December 12 – Albrecht von Haller (born 1708), German
- Christoph Friedrich Wedekind (born 1709), German
- Johann Gottlieb Willamov (born 1736), German

== See also ==
- List of years in poetry
- List of years in literature
- 18th century in poetry
- 18th century in literature
- French literature of the 18th century
- Sturm und Drang (the conventional translation is "Storm and Stress"; a more literal translation, however, might be "storm and urge", "storm and longing", "storm and drive" or "storm and impulse"), a movement in German literature (including poetry) and music from the late 1760s through the early 1780s
- List of years in poetry
- Poetry
