= 1776 in poetry =

List of years in poetry	(table)
- … 1766; 1767; 1768; 1769; 1770; 1771; 1772; 1773; 1774; 1775; 1776; 1777; 1778; 1779; 1780; 1781; 1782; 1783; 1784; 1785; 1786 …
- In literature 1773 1774 1775 1776 1777 1778 1779
- Art; Archaeology; Architecture; Literature; Music; Philosophy; Science; +...

Nationality words link to articles with information on the nation's poetry or literature (for instance, Irish or France).

== Events ==
- March — American poet Phillis Wheatley, visits with General George Washington for half an hour in Cambridge, Massachusetts, after sending him the previous October a poem written in his honor. A former slave, she was a strong supporter of independence during the American Revolution. The poem was published March 26 in the Virginia Gazette

== Works published ==
=== United Kingdom ===
- James Beattie, Poems on Several Occasions
- Richard Graves, Euphrosyne; or, Amusements on the Road of Life
- David Herd, editor, Ancient and Modern Scottish Songs, anthology
- William Mickle, translator, The Lusiad; or, The Discovery of India, translated from the original Portuguese of Luis de Camoens
- Hannah More, Sir Eldred of the Bower, and The Bleeding Rock
- Jonathan Richardson, Morning Thoughts; or, Poetical Meditations, Moral, Divine and Miscellaneous
- John Scott, Amwell
- Augustus Montague Toplady, Psalms and Hymns for Public and Private Worship
- William Whitehead, Variety, published anonymously

=== Other ===
- Johannes Ewald, a funeral ode on the occasion of the death of Frederik V; Denmark
- Basilio da Gama, Os Campos Elíseos ("The Elysian Fields"), on the fine arts; Brazil
- Vincenzo Monti, La visione di Ezechiello, Italy
- Jonathan Odell, "A Birthday Song", United States

== Births ==
Death years link to the corresponding "[year] in poetry" article:

- April 17 – Jean-François Roger (died 1842), French poet and politician
- April 21 (bapt.) – Ann Griffiths (died 1805), Welsh hymn-writer
- July 18 – John Struthers (died 1853), Scottish poet
- September 21 – John Fitchett (died 1838), English epic poet
- November 16 – Mary Matilda Betham (died 1852), English diarist, scholar and poet
- year not certain – Charles Newton

== Deaths ==
Birth years link to the corresponding "[year] in poetry" article:

- January 26 – Evan Lloyd (born 1734), Welsh satirical poet and clergyman
- June 13 – Elizabeth Scott (born 1708), British-born, Colonial American poet and hymnwriter
- August 28? (bur.) – John Edwards (Sion y Potlau) (born 1699?), Welsh poet
- date not known – George Smith (born 1713), British
- Jeanne-Catherine Van Goethem (born 1720), Flemish poet

== See also ==
- List of years in poetry
- List of years in literature
- 18th century in poetry
- 18th century in literature
- French literature of the 18th century
- Sturm und Drang (the conventional translation is "Storm and Stress"; a more literal translation, however, might be "storm and urge", "storm and longing", "storm and drive" or "storm and impulse"), a movement in German literature (including poetry) and music from the late 1760s through the early 1780s
- List of years in poetry
- Poetry
