= 1774 in poetry =

| List of years in poetry | (table) |
- … 1764; 1765; 1766; 1767; 1768; 1769; 1770; 1771; 1772; 1773; 1774; 1775; 1776; 1777; 1778; 1779; 1780; 1781; 1782; 1783; 1784 …
- In literature 1771 1772 1773 1774 1775 1776 1777
- Art; Archaeology; Architecture; Literature; Music; Philosophy; Science; +...

Nationality words link to articles with information on the nation's poetry or literature (for instance, Irish or France).

== Events ==
- During this year's harvest, 15-year-old Scottish farm labourer Robert Burns is assisted by his contemporary Nelly Kilpatrick who inspires his first attempt at poetry, "O, Once I Lov'd A Bonnie Lass".
- Jacques Delille elected to membership in the Académie Française in large part due to his verse translation of the Georgics in 1769

== Works published ==
=== Colonial America ===
- Hugh Henry Brackenridge, "A Poem on Divine Revelation"
- Samuel Occom, editor, A Choice Collection of Hymns and Spiritual Songs
- John Trumbull, "An Elegy on the Times"

=== United Kingdom ===
- James Beattie, The Minstrel; or, The Progress of Genius, Book 2 (Book 1 1771, both books published together with other verse in 1775)
- William Dunkin, The Poetical Works of the Late William Dunkin, posthumously published; Volume 1 includes Latin and Ancient Greek poetry with English translations
- Oliver Goldsmith, Retaliation; a poem, published April 19
- Richard Graves, The Progress of Gallantry, published anonymously
- Thomas Gray, The Poems of Mr Gray (posthumous)
- William Mason, An Heroic Postscript to the Public, published anonymously
- Hannah More, The Inflexible Captive: A tragedy
- Samuel Jackson Pratt (as "Courtney Melmoth"), The Tears of A Genius, occasioned by the Death of Dr Goldsmith
- Henry James Pye, Farringdon Hill
- Mary Scott, The Female Advocate, a response to The Feminead 1754 by John Duncombe
- Thomas Warton the Younger, History of English Poetry, in three volumes, published from 1774-1781
- William Whitehead, Plays and Poems by William Whitehead, Esq. Poet Laureat (see also Poems 1788)

=== Other ===
- Charles Batteux, Principes de la littérature, including Cours de belles lettres of 1765; criticism; France

== Births ==
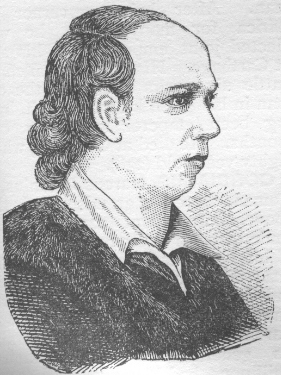
Oliver Goldsmith

Death years link to the corresponding "[year] in poetry" article:

- June 3 – Robert Tannahill (died 1810), Scottish "Weaver Poet"
- August 12 – Robert Southey (died 1843), English poet
- November 4 – Robert Allan (died 1841), Scottish "Weaver Poet"

== Deaths ==
Birth years link to the corresponding "[year] in poetry" article:

- Early – Lady Dorothea Du Bois (born 1728), Irish poet and writer
- c. January 29–February 5 – James Love, pseudonym of James Dance (born 1721), English poet, playwright and actor
- May 11 – Charles Jenner (born 1736), English poet, novelist and Anglican cleric
- August 14 – Johann Jakob Reiske (born 1716), German scholar and physician
- October 16 – Oliver Goldsmith (born 1728), English writer and poet
- October 17 – Robert Fergusson (born 1750), Scottish poet
- November 25 – Henry Baker (born 1698), English naturalist, poet, sign-language developer
- December 20 – Paul Whitehead (born 1710), English satiric poet
- Khwaja Muhammad Zaman (born 1713), Indian, Sindhi-language poet

== See also ==
- List of years in poetry
- List of years in literature
- 18th century in poetry
- 18th century in literature
- French literature of the 18th century
- Sturm und Drang (the conventional translation is "Storm and Stress"; a more literal translation, however, might be "storm and urge", "storm and longing", "storm and drive" or "storm and impulse"), a movement in German literature (including poetry) and music from the late 1760s through the early 1780s
- List of years in poetry
- Poetry
