= 1775 in poetry =

List of years in poetry	(table)
- … 1765; 1766; 1767; 1768; 1769; 1770; 1771; 1772; 1773; 1774; 1775; 1776; 1777; 1778; 1779; 1780; 1781; 1782; 1783; 1784; 1785 …
- In literature 1772 1773 1774 1775 1776 1777 1778
- Art; Archaeology; Architecture; Literature; Music; Philosophy; Science; +...

Nationality words link to articles with information on the nation's poetry or literature (for instance, Irish or France).

== Events ==
26 October - Phillis Wheatley sends a poem and letter to General George Washington in his honor. He responded to her in 1776.

== Works published ==
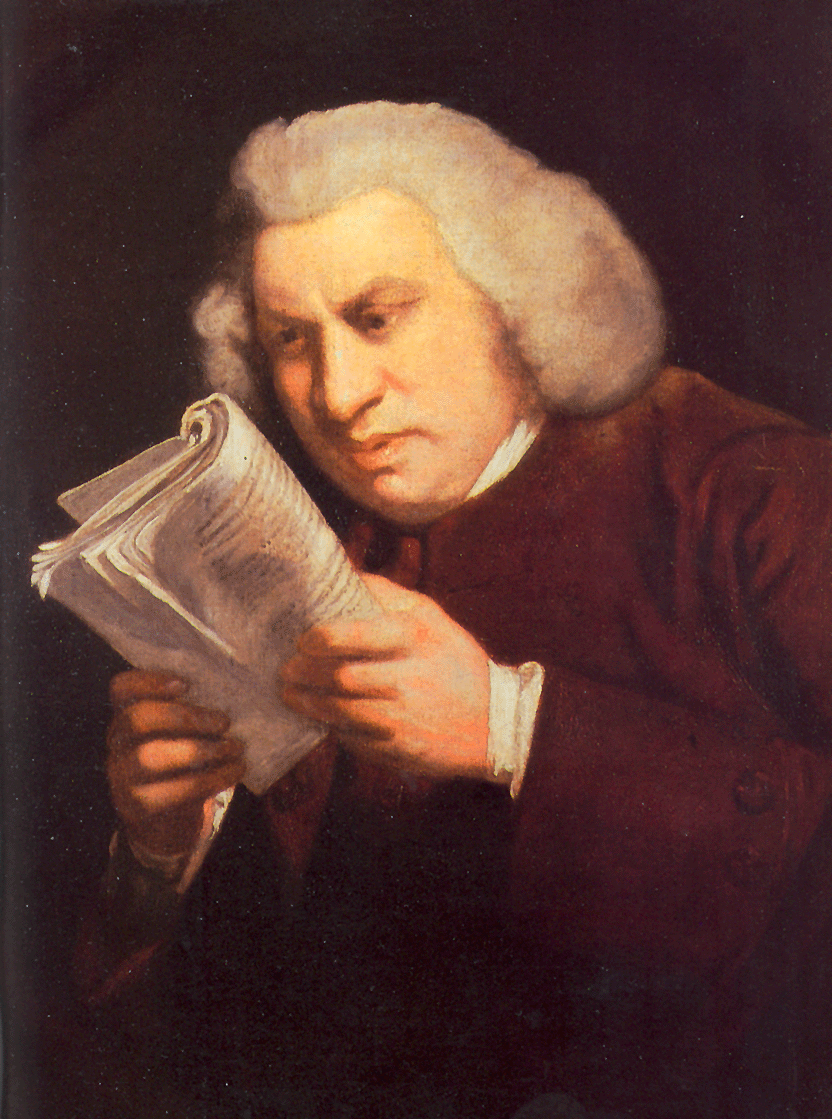
Samuel Johnson in 1775 by Joshua Reynolds

=== Colonial America ===
- Anna Young Smith, published under the pen name "Sylvia", "An Elegy to the Memory of the America Volunteers", published in the Pennsylvania Magazine, Colonial America
- Philip Freneau:
  - "General Gage's Soliloquy"
  - "General Gage's Confession"
  - "A Voyage to Boston"
  - "American Liberty"
  - "A Political Litany"
- John Trumbull, first two cantos of M'Fingal, a satire on American Tories during the American Revolution (later published in completed form in 1782)

=== United Kingdom ===
- Hester Chapone, Miscellanies in Prose and Verse
- George Crabbe, Inebriety, published anonymously
- Hugh Downman, The Drama
- Thomas Gray, The Poems of Mr. Gray, to which are Prefixed Memoirs of his Life and Writings by W. Mason, M.A., Annotated letters of Thomas Gray, comments by Mason on the poems; York: A. Ward; criticism and biography
- Edward Jerningham, The Fall of Mexico
- Mary Robinson, Poems by Mrs. Robinson
- Richard Savage, The Works of Richard Savage, edited by Samuel Johnson, with a life of Savage by Johnson, later reprinted in Johnson's Prefaces [...] to the Works of the English Poets 1779 (see also An Account of the Life of Mr. Richard Savage 1744)

== Births ==
Death years link to the corresponding "[year] in poetry" article:

- 30 January – Walter Savage Landor (died 1864), English writer and poet
- 10 February – Charles Lamb (died 1834), English writer and poet
- 12 February – Charles Lloyd (died 1839), English poet, friend of Lamb
- 24 March – Muthuswami Dikshitar (died 1835), South Indian poet and composer
- 15 June – Carlo Porta (died 1821), Italian poet
- 9 July – Matthew Lewis ("Monk Lewis") (died 1818), English Gothic novelist and dramatist
- 11 July – Joseph Blanco White, born José María Blanco Crespo (died 1841), Spanish-born theologian and poet writing in English
- 31 August – Agnes Bulmer (died 1836), English poet
- 8 September – John Leyden (died 1811), Scottish orientalist
- 16 December – Jane Austen (died 1817), English novelist and poet

== Deaths ==
Birth years link to the corresponding "[year] in poetry" article:

- 21 March – Samuel Boyce, English engraver, dramatist and poet
- 2 October – Fukuda Chiyo-ni, or Kaga no Chiyo, 千代尼 (born 1703), Japanese woman poet of the Edo period, prominent writer of haiku
- Approximate date – Ramprasad Sen (born 1718/23), Bengali Shakta poet

== See also ==
- List of years in poetry
- List of years in literature
- 18th century in poetry
- 18th century in literature
- French literature of the 18th century
- Sturm und Drang (the conventional translation is "Storm and Stress"; a more literal translation, however, might be "storm and urge", "storm and longing", "storm and drive" or "storm and impulse"), a movement in German literature (including poetry) and music from the late 1760s through the early 1780s
- List of years in poetry
- Poetry
