= 1778 in poetry =

List of years in poetry	(table)
- … 1768; 1769; 1770; 1771; 1772; 1773; 1774; 1775; 1776; 1777; 1778; 1779; 1780; 1781; 1782; 1783; 1784; 1785; 1786; 1787; 1788 …
- In literature 1775 1776 1777 1778 1779 1780 1781
- Art; Archaeology; Architecture; Literature; Music; Philosophy; Science; +...

Nationality words link to articles with information on the nation's poetry or literature (for instance, Irish or France).

== Works published in English ==
=== United Kingdom ===
- John Codrington Bampfylde, Sixteen Sonnets
- William Combe, The Auction
- George Ellis, writing under the pen name "Sir Gregory Gander", Poetical Tales
- William Hayley, A Poetical Epistle to an Eminent Painter, published anonymously; addressed to George Romney
- Vicesimus Knox, Cursory Thoughts on Satire and Satirists, a critical essay
- John Scott, Moral Eclogues, published anonymously
- Percival Stockdale, Inquiry into the Nature and Genuine Laws of Poetry; including a particular Defence of the Writings and Genius of Mr. Pope
- John Wolcot, writing under the pen name "Peter Pindar", A Poetical, Supplicating, Modest and Affecting Epistle to those Literary Colossuses the Reviewers

=== United States ===
- Joel Barlow, The Prospect of Peace
- William Billings, Chester
- Francis Hopkinson:
  - "The Battle of the Kegs", United States
  - "Date Obolum Bellisario"
  - "The Birds, the Beasts, and the Bat"

== Works published in other languages ==
- Ippolit Bogdanovich, Dushenka, a long poem and his best-known work, Russia
- Johannes Ewald, Kong Christian stod ved höjen Mast ("King Christian Stood by the Lofty mast"), a popular song in his melodrama The Fishermen, which later became the Danish national anthem (Henry Wadsworth Longfellow later translated it into English)
- Johann Gottfried Herder - Volkslieder nebst untermischten anderen Stücken
- Évariste de Parny - Les Poésies érotiques

== Births ==
Death years link to the corresponding "[year] in poetry" article:

- February 6 – Ugo Foscolo (died 1827), Italian writer, revolutionary and poet
- April 10 – William Hazlitt (died 1830), English writer, essayist and critic
- August 22 – James Kirke Paulding (died 1860), American novelist, poet and United States Secretary of the Navy; a writer for Salamagundi magazine who took it over before it failed
- September 9 – Clemens Brentano (died 1842), German poet and novelist
- December 22 – Anna Maria Porter (died 1832), English poet and novelist
- Robert Davidson (died 1855), Scottish peasant poet

== Deaths ==
Birth years link to the corresponding "[year] in poetry" article:

- May 30 – Voltaire (born 1694), French Enlightenment writer, poet, essayist and philosopher
- August 11 – Augustus Toplady (born 1740), English Anglican clergyman, poet and hymn-writer
- Rob Donn (born 1714), Scottish Gaelic poet

== See also ==
- 18th century in literature
- 18th century in poetry
- French literature of the 18th century
- List of years in poetry
- List of years in literature
- Sturm und Drang (the conventional translation is "Storm and Stress"; a more literal translation, however, might be "storm and urge", "storm and longing", "storm and drive" or "storm and impulse"), a movement in German literature (including poetry) and music from the late 1760s through the early 1780s
