= 1786 in poetry =

List of years in poetry	(table)
- … 1776; 1777; 1778; 1779; 1780; 1781; 1782; 1783; 1784; 1785; 1786; 1787; 1788; 1789; 1790; 1791; 1792; 1793; 1794; 1795; 1796 …
- In literature 1783 1784 1785 1786 1787 1788 1789
- Art; Archaeology; Architecture; Literature; Music; Philosophy; Science; +...

Nationality words link to articles with information on the nation's poetry or literature (for instance, Irish or France).

== Events ==
- July 31 – Scottish poet Robert Burns' Poems, Chiefly in the Scottish Dialect is published by John Wilson in Kilmarnock (the text having been submitted to him on July 13). The volume proves so popular that Burns abandons his plans to emigrate to Jamaica on September 1 for a post as a bookkeeper on a slave plantation and on November 27–28 journeys on a borrowed pony from Mossgiel Farm for his first visit to Edinburgh. Two weeks later he extemporises his "Address to a Haggis" which is first published on December 20 in the Caledonian Mercury.

== Works published ==
=== United Kingdom ===
- Jane Bowdler, Poems and Essays, "By a Lady Lately Deceased", 17 editions by 1830)
- Robert Burns
  - Poems Chiefly in the Scottish Dialect (see also Poems 1787 and 1793) Including:
    - "Epitaph for James Smith"
    - "To A Mouse, on Turning Her Up in Her Nest, with the Plough"
    - "To a Mountain Daisy"
    - "Address to the Deil"
    - "The Cotter's Saturday Night"
  - "On Dining with Lord Daer"
- Hannah Cowley, The Scottish Village; or, Pitcairn Green
- Samuel Rogers, An Ode to Superstition, with Some Other Poems, published anonymously
- Helen Maria Williams, Poems
- John Wolcot, writing under the pen name "Peter Pindar":
  - Bozzy and Piozzi; or, The British Biographers, 19 editions by 1788
  - Farewel Odes. For the Year 1786 (published with the title as spelled here)
  - A Poetical and Congratulatory Epistle to James Boswell

=== United States ===
- Philip Freneau, The Poems of Philip Freneau, Written Chiefly During the late War, United States
- Joseph Brown Ladd, The Poems of Arouet
- John Parke, The Lyric Works of Horace [...] to Which Are Added a Number of Original Poems [...], poetry, drama and prose; including "Ovid's Elegies and Anacreon's Odes", translations by David French (poet), United States

=== Other ===
- Solomon Gessner, works, translated into French from the original German of the Swiss poet; in three volumes, published starting this year, with the last volume published in 1793

== Births ==
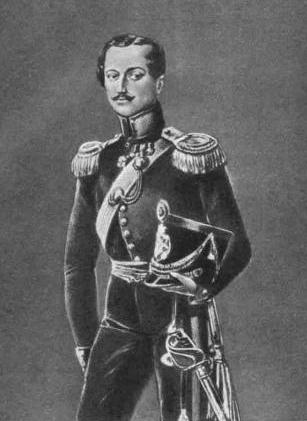
Prince Alexander Chavchavadze

Death years link to the corresponding "[year] in poetry" article:

- May 13 – Anna Ehrenström (died 1857), Swedish poet
- June 20 – Marceline Desbordes-Valmore (died 1859), French poet
- June 26 – Sunthorn Phu (died 1855), Thai poet
- September 18
  - George Beattie (died 1823), Scottish poet
  - Justinus Kerner (died 1862), German poet of the Swabian school and physician
- October 23 – Barron Field (died 1846), Anglo-Australian judge and poet
- December 30 – Bjarni Thorarensen (died 1841), Icelandic poet
- Alexander Chavchavadze (died 1846), Georgian poet, god-son of Catherine the Great

== Deaths ==
Birth years link to the corresponding "[year] in poetry" article:

- January 17 – Edward Thompson, known as "Poet Thompson" (born 1738?), English naval commodore and poet, dies onboard HMS Grampus off West Africa
- May 2 – Petronella Johanna de Timmerman (born 1723), Dutch poet and scientist
- June 2 – Dugald Buchanan (born 1716), Scottish religious poet writing in Gaelic
- July 14 – John Collier, known by the pseudonym "Tim(othy) Bobbin" (born 1708), English caricaturist and satirical poet

== See also ==
- Poetry
