= 1785 in poetry =

List of years in poetry	(table)
- … 1775; 1776; 1777; 1778; 1779; 1780; 1781; 1782; 1783; 1784; 1785; 1786; 1787; 1788; 1789; 1790; 1791; 1792; 1793; 1794; 1795 …
- In literature 1782 1783 1784 1785 1786 1787 1788
- Art; Archaeology; Architecture; Literature; Music; Philosophy; Science; +...

Nationality words link to articles with information on the nation's poetry or literature (for instance, Irish or France).

== Events ==
- April 14 - Death of English poet William Whitehead in London. Reverend Thomas Warton succeeds him as Poet Laureate of Great Britain after the refusal of William Mason.
- May 22 - Scottish poet Robert Burns' first child, Elizabeth ("Dear-bought Bess"), is born to his mother's servant, Elizabeth Paton.

== Works published in English ==
=== United Kingdom ===
- Samuel Egerton Brydges, Sonnets and other Poems, published anonymously
- Robert Burns, "To A Mouse", "Halloween"
- Colman, George, and Bonnell Thornton, eds. Poems by the most eminent ladies of Great Britain and Ireland. Re-published from the collection of G. Colman and B. Thornton, Esqrs., with considerable alterations, additions, and improvements. London: W. Stafford, 1785: 2nd ed. of one of the earliest anthologies of women's writing in English
- William Combe, The Royal Dream; or, The P[rince] in a Panic, published anonymously
- William Cowper, The Task, Volume 2 of Poems, in addition to the title poem, the book includes "The Diverting History of John Gilpin" (a poem first published in 1782), "An Epistle to Joseph Hill, Esq.", "Tirocinium; or, A Review of Schools" (first volume of Poems published 1782, Poems 1815)
- George Crabbe, The News-Paper
- William Hayley, A Philosophical, Historical and Moral Essay on Old Maids
- Samuel Johnson, The Works of Samuel Johnson, poetry and prose in 11 volumes (another two volumes published in 1787 and another in 1788)
- Hannah More, Sensibility: A Poetical Epistle, United Kingdom
- Edward Lovibond, Poems on Several Occasions
- Charles Wilkins (translator), Bhagvat-geeta, or Dialogues of Kreeshna and Arjoon
- John Wolcot, writing under the pen name "Peter Pindar":
  - The Lousiad, Canto 1 (Canto 2 published 1787, Canto 3 in 1791, Canto 4 in 1792, Canto 5 in 1795)
  - Lyric Odes, for the Year 1785
- Ann Yearsley, Poems, on Several Occasions

=== Works published in other languages ===
- János Bacsanyi, The Valour of the Magyars, Hungary
- Jens Baggesen, Comic Tales, written in imitation of Voltaire; Denmark
- Friedrich Schiller, Ode to Joy, Germany

== Births ==
Death years link to the corresponding "[year] in poetry" article:

- January 13 - Samuel Woodworth (died 1842), American author, literary journalist, playwright, librettist and poet
- March 7 - Alessandro Manzoni (died 1873), Italian poet and novelist
- April 4 - Bettina von Arnim (died 1859), German writer, poet, composer and novelist
- April 6 - John Pierpont (died 1866), American poet, teacher, lawyer, merchant and Congregational minister
- October 18 - Thomas Love Peacock (died 1866), English satirical novelist and writer
- November 13 - Lady Caroline Lamb, born the Honourable Caroline Ponsonby (died 1828), English aristocrat, novelist and poet best known for her affair with Lord Byron
- Also:
  - Bhojo Bhagat (died 1850), Indian, Gujarati-language devotional poet
  - Gopala Krishna Pattanayak (died 1862), Indian, Oriya-language poet

== Deaths ==
Birth years link to the corresponding "[year] in poetry" article:

- January 19 - Zaharije Orfelin (born 1726), Serbian educator, administrator, poet, engraver, lexicographer, herbalist, historian, winemaker, translator, editor, publisher, polemicist and traveler
- April 14 - William Whitehead (born 1715), English poet and playwright
- April 26 - Karl Siegmund von Seckendorff (born 1744), German
- April 27 - Henry Taylor (born 1711), Church of England clergyman, author and poet
- September 17 - Antoine Léonard Thomas (born 1732), French poet
- November 25 - Richard Glover (born 1712), English poet
- December 29 - Johan Herman Wessel (born 1742), Norwegian poet

== See also ==
- Poetry
