= 1781 in poetry =

List of years in poetry	(table)
- … 1771; 1772; 1773; 1774; 1775; 1776; 1777; 1778; 1779; 1780; 1781; 1782; 1783; 1784; 1785; 1786; 1787; 1788; 1789; 1790; 1791 …
- In literature 1778 1779 1780 1781 1782 1783 1784
- Art; Archaeology; Architecture; Literature; Music; Philosophy; Science; +...

Nationality words link to articles with information on the nation's poetry or literature (for instance, Irish or France).

== Events ==
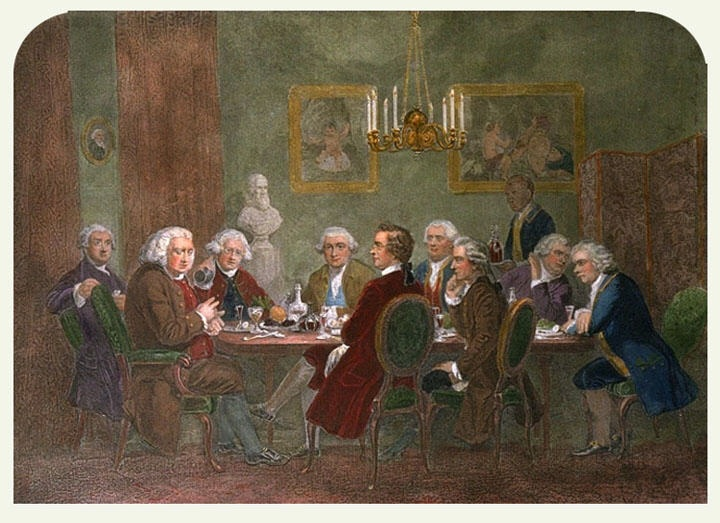
A literary party at Sir Joshua Reynolds, painted this year. The scene shows the friends of Reynolds, including poets Samuel Johnson, Oliver Goldsmith and Thomas Warton - many of whom were members of "The Club" (use cursor to identify).

- George Crabbe writes to Edmund Burke asking for financial assistance. The outcome is the publication of Crabbe's poem The Library.

== Works published ==
=== United Kingdom ===
- William Cowper, Anti-Thelyphthora, published anonymously (see also Martin Madan's Thelyphthora 1780)
- George Crabbe, The Library, published anonymously
- Anne Francis, A Poetical Translation of the Song of Solomon
- William Hayley, The Triumphs of Temper
- George Keate, Poetical Works
- Samuel Jackson Pratt, Sympathy; or, A Sketch of the Social Passion, published anonymously
- Anna Seward, Monody on Major André, on John André, hanged as a spy in the American Revolution

=== United States ===
- Philip Freneau, The British Prison-Ship: A Poem
- William Hayley, "The Triumphs of Temper: A Poem"
- Francis Hopkinson, The Temple of Minerva
- Anna Seward, Monody on Major Andre

=== Other ===
- Santa Rita Durão, Caramuru, Portuguese poem written in Brazil

== Births ==
Death years link to the corresponding "[year] in poetry" article:

- January 26 – Ludwig Achim von Arnim (died 1831), German poet and novelist
- March 17 – Ebenezer Elliott (died 1849), English poet, known as the Corn Law rhymer
- September 12 – John Grieve (died 1836), Scottish poet
- November 6 – Lucy Aikin (died 1864), English writer of histories, poetry and novels and translator
- November 29 – Andrés Bello (died 1865), Venezuelan humanist, diplomat, poet, legislator, philosopher, educator and philologist
- December 25? – Sydney, Lady Morgan, née Owenson (died 1859), Irish novelist and poet

== Deaths ==
Birth years link to the corresponding "[year] in poetry" article:

- January 6 – Mirza Mazhar Jan-e-Janaan (born 1699), Indian, Urdu-language poet, shot
- February 15 – Gotthold Ephraim Lessing (born 1729), German poet
- March 17 – Johannes Ewald (born 1743), Danish national dramatist and poet
- May 8 – Richard Jago (born 1715), English clergyman and poet
- June 25 – Samuel Gotthold Lange (born 1711), German poet
- November 4 – Johann Nikolaus Götz (born 1721), German poet
- Azar Bigdeli (died 1722), Persian anthologist and poet

== See also ==
- List of years in poetry
- List of years in literature
- 18th century in poetry
- 18th century in literature
- French literature of the 18th century
- Sturm und Drang (the conventional translation is "Storm and Stress"; a more literal translation, however, might be "storm and urge", "storm and longing", "storm and drive" or "storm and impulse"), a movement in German literature (including poetry) and music from the late 1760s through the early 1780s
- List of years in poetry
- Poetry
