= 1790 in poetry =

List of years in poetry	(table)
- … 1780; 1781; 1782; 1783; 1784; 1785; 1786; 1787; 1788; 1789; 1790; 1791; 1792; 1793; 1794; 1795; 1796; 1797; 1798; 1799; 1800 …
- In literature 1787 1788 1789 1790 1791 1792 1793
- Art; Archaeology; Architecture; Literature; Music; Philosophy; Science; +...

Nationality words link to articles with information on the nation's poetry or literature (for instance, Irish or French).

== Events ==
- March - Jens Baggesen returns to Denmark. After ridiculing his fellow Danes in his poem, Holger the Dane and leaving the country for Germany, Baggensen proceeded to Switzerland and became a good friend of the Swiss poet Johan Kaspar Lavater and a leader in the Sturm und Drang movement.
- May 21 - Thomas Warton dies. He is succeeded as Poet Laureate of Great Britain by writer and police magistrate Henry James Pye (who has just retired as a Member of Parliament) following William Hayley's refusal of the office.

== Works published ==
=== United Kingdom ===
- Joanna Baillie, published anonymously, Poems
- William Blake, published anonymously, The Marriage of Heaven and Hell, illuminated book with 27 relief-etched plates
- Robert Burns, "Tam o' Shanter" Scottish, written
- Thomas Edwards (Twm o'r Nant), Gardd o Gerddi, Welsh
- George Ellis, ed., Specimens of the Early English Poets
- Anne Francis, anonymously published "by a lady", then reissued this year under the author's name, Miscellaneous Poems
- Robert Merry, The Laurel of Liberty
- William Sotheby, Poems
- Ann Yearsley, Stanzas of Woe

=== United States ===
- Peter Markoe, the Reconciliation; or, The Triumph of Nature, an unproduced opera in verse
- Sarah Wentworth Morton, published under the name "Philenia, a Lady of Boston", Ouabi; or, The Virtues of Nature: An Indian Tale in Four Cantos, narrative poem portraying a love triangle between an Indian chief, his wife and an aristocrat from Europe; set to music in 1793 by Hans Graham; the poem inspired Louis James Bacon to write the play The American Indian in 1795
- Mercy Otis Warren, Poems, Dramatic and Miscellaneous, the first work printed under the author's own name; includes verse tragedies; many of the poems promote republican virtues and show women as moral authorities

== Births ==
Death years link to the corresponding "[year] in poetry" article:

- January 1 – James Wills (died 1868), Irish writer and poet
- January 10 – Anders Abraham Grafström (died 1870), Swedish historian, priest and poet
- July 8 – Fitz-Greene Halleck (died 1867), American
- October 21 – Alphonse de Lamartine (died 1869), French writer, poet and politician
- date unknown – Mohammad Ibrahim Zauq (died 1854), Urdu poet

== Deaths ==
Birth years link to the corresponding "[year] in poetry" article:

- May 21 – Thomas Warton (born 1728), English literary historian, critic and Poet Laureate of Great Britain
- July 25 – William Livingston (born 1723), English Colonial American public official, poet and writer
- August 22 – Andrew Macdonald (born 1757), Scottish clergyman, poet and playwright

== See also ==
- Poetry
- List of years in poetry
