= 1787 in poetry =

List of years in poetry	(table)
- … 1777; 1778; 1779; 1780; 1781; 1782; 1783; 1784; 1785; 1786; 1787; 1788; 1789; 1790; 1791; 1792; 1793; 1794; 1795; 1796; 1797 …
- In literature 1784 1785 1786 1787 1788 1789 1790
- Art; Archaeology; Architecture; Literature; Music; Philosophy; Science; +...

Nationality words link to articles with information on the nation's poetry or literature (for instance, Irish or France).

== Events ==
- April 17 – The Edinburgh edition of Scottish poet Robert Burns' Poems, Chiefly in the Scottish Dialect is published by William Creech including a portrait of Burns by Alexander Nasmyth. Burns has great social success in the city's literary circles; 16-year-old Walter Scott meets him at the house of Adam Ferguson. On December 4 he meets Agnes Maclehose at a party given by Miss Erskine Nimmo.

== Works published ==
=== United Kingdom ===
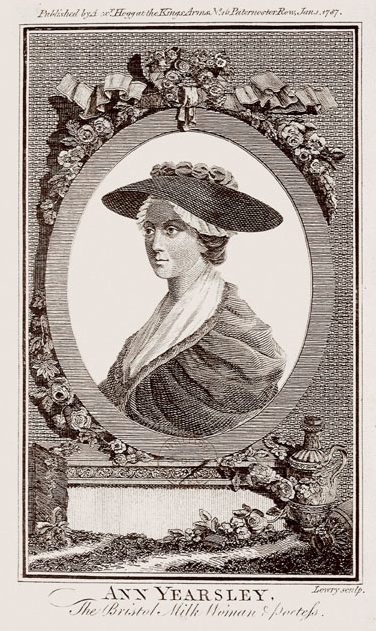
Ann Yearsley, in an engraving published this year

- Robert Burns:
  - Poems Chiefly in the Scottish Dialect (see also the editions of 1786, 1793)
  - see also Richard Glover's The Scots Musical Museum, below
- Anne Francis, Charlotte to Werter
- Richard Glover, The Atheniad
- James Johnson, editor, The Scots Musical Museum, an anthology with 177 of the 600 songs written by Robert Burns, who had collected many of the others; published in six volumes from this year to 1803; Volumes 2–5 edited by Burns
- George Keate, The Distressed Poet
- Sophia Lee, A Hermit's Tale, published anonymously
- Robert Merry, Paulina; or, The Russian Daughter
- John Ogilvie, The Fame of the Druids, published anonymously
- Henry James Pye, Poems on Various Subjects, including "Aerophorion", possibly the first poem about an aviator (James Sadler (balloonist))
- Edward Rushton, West-Indian Eclogues, published anonymously
- John Thelwall, Poems on Various Subjects
- John Wolcot, writing under the pen name "Peter Pindar", Ode Upon Ode; or, A Peep at St. James
- Ann Yearsley, Poems, on Various Subjects

=== United States ===
- Joel Barlow, The Vision of Columbus, nine books; describes America as prosperous and improving, seeks to promote "the love of national liberty" in Americans (revised as The Columbiad 1807)
- James Beattie, Poems on Several Occasions
- Peter Markoe, Miscellaneous Poems

=== Other ===
- Jean-François Marmontel, Éléments de littérature, including rewritten parts of Poétique française (1763), French criticism
- Évariste-Désiré Parny, Chansons madécasses, prose poems (later set to music by Ravel); France

== Births ==
Death years link to the corresponding "[year] in poetry" article:

- May 14 – Alexander Laing (died 1857), Scottish poet
- November 15 – Richard Henry Dana Sr. (died 1879), American poet, critic and lawyer
- November 21 – Bryan Procter ("Barry Cornwall") (died 1874), English poet
- December 16 – Mary Russell Mitford (died 1855), English novelist, poet and dramatist
- Margaret Miller Davidson Sr. (died 1844), American novelist, mother of poets Lucretia Maria Davidson, Margaret Miller Davidson and Levi P. Davidson
- Susanna Hawkins (died 1868), Scottish poet

== Deaths ==
Birth years link to the corresponding "[year] in poetry" article:

- February 13 – Ruđer Bošković (born 1711), Ragusan polymath and poet
- September 1 – Agatha Lovisa de la Myle (born 1724), Baltic-German and Latvian poet
- September – Moses Browne (born 1704), English poet and clergyman
- November 3 – Robert Lowth (born 1710), English Anglican Bishop, poet, professor of poetry at the University of Oxford, grammarian who wrote one of the most influential textbooks on English grammar
- December 18 – Soame Jenyns (born 1704), English writer and poet

== See also ==
- Poetry
