= 1860 in poetry =

| List of years in poetry | (table) |
- … 1850; 1851; 1852; 1853; 1854; 1855; 1856; 1857; 1858; 1859; 1860; 1861; 1862; 1863; 1864; 1865; 1866; 1867; 1868; 1869; 1870 …
- In literature 1857 1858 1859 1860 1861 1862 1863
- Art; Archaeology; Architecture; Literature; Music; Philosophy; Science; +...

Nationality words link to articles with information on the nation's poetry or literature (for instance, Irish or France).

== Events ==
- Andreas Munch becomes the first person to be granted a poet's pension by the Parliament of Norway.

== Works published in English ==
=== Canada ===
- Charles Heavysege, Count Filippo
- Charles Sangster, Hesperus and Other Poems and Lyrics

=== United Kingdom ===
- Elizabeth Barrett Browning, Poems Before Congress
- Samuel Lover, Metrical Tales, and Other Poems, illustrated by Hablot Knight Browne, Kenney Meadows and others
- Coventry Patmore, Faithful for Ever (The Angel in the House, Volume 3; see also The Betrothal 1854, The Espousals 1856, The Victories of Love 1863)
- John Leicester Warren, writing under the pen name "George F. Preston", Ballads and Metrical Sketches

=== United States ===
- William Turner Coggeshall, editor, Poets and Poetry of the West, anthology
- Paul Hamilton Hayne, Avolio: A Legend of the Island of Cos
- Oliver Wendell Holmes, The Professor at the Breakfast-Table, fiction, nonfiction and verse
- William Dean Howells and John James Piatt, Poems of Two Friends
- Adrien Rouquette, L'Antoniade, ou la solitude avec Dieu
- Edmund Clarence Stedman, Poems, Lyrical and Idyllic
- Henry Timrod, Poems
- Walt Whitman, Leaves of Grass, third edition, including "Calamus" poems
- John Greenleaf Whittier, Home Ballads, Poems, and Lyrics

=== Other ===
- C. J. Carleton, South Australian Lyrics, Australia
- John Anthony Moore, Tasmanian Rhymings, Australia

== Works published in other languages ==
- Charles Baudelaire, Les paradis artificiels ("Artificial Paradise"), France
- Gul Bakhsh, Kukikatar Puthi (কুকি কাটার পুঁথি), Bengali
- Marceline Desbordes-Valmore, Poésies inédites (posthumous)
- Michael Madhusudan Dutt, Tilottama Sambhab Kabya (তিলোত্তমাসম্ভব কাব্য, "Birth of Tilottama"), Bengali

== Births ==
Death years link to the corresponding "[year] in poetry" article:

- January 10 – Charles G. D. Roberts (died 1943), Canadian poet and writer known as the "Father of Canadian Poetry" because he serves as an inspiration for other writers of his time; also known as one of the "Confederation poets" (together with his cousin Bliss Carman, Archibald Lampman and Duncan Campbell Scott)
- June 1 – Wilfred Campbell (died 1918), Canadian
- August 5 – John Philip Bourke (died 1914), Australian
- September 6 – Lorentzos Mavilis (died 1912), Greek
- September 14 – Hamlin Garland, (died 1940), American novelist, poet, essayist and short story writer
- September 18 – Clinton Scollard (died 1932), American
- October 6 – Rosamund Marriott Watson, born Rosamund Ball and writing as Graham R. Tomson (died 1911), English
- December 8 – Amanda McKittrick Ros, born Anna McKittrick (died 1939), Irish novelist and poet noted for her purple style
- December 12 – Harriet Monroe (died 1936), American editor, scholar, literary critic and patron of the arts, best known as the founder and longtime editor of Poetry magazine
- Date not known:
  - Akshay Kumar Boral (died 1919), Indian, Bengali-language poet
  - Helena Jane Coleman (died 1953), Canadian music teacher, poet and writer
  - Nagesh Vishvanath Pai (died 1920), Indian poet and fiction writer

== Deaths ==
Birth years link to the corresponding "[year] in poetry" article:

- April 6 – James Kirke Paulding (born 1778), American novelist, poet, writer for and sometime owner of Salamagundi magazine and a United States Secretary of the Navy
- August 25 – Johan Ludvig Heiberg (born 1791), Danish
- November 24 – George Croly (born 1780), Irish-born poet, novelist, historian, and clergyman

== See also ==
- 19th century in poetry
- 19th century in literature
- List of years in poetry
- List of years in literature
- Victorian literature
- French literature of the 19th century
- Poetry
