= 1846 in poetry =

List of years in poetry	(table)
- … 1836; 1837; 1838; 1839; 1840; 1841; 1842; 1843; 1844; 1845; 1846; 1847; 1848; 1849; 1850; 1851; 1852; 1853; 1854; 1855; 1856 …
- In literature 1843 1844 1845 1846 1847 1848 1849
- Art; Archaeology; Architecture; Literature; Music; Philosophy; Science; +...

Nationality words link to articles with information on the nation's poetry or literature (for instance, Irish or France).

== Events ==
- c. May 22 – The Brontë sisters' first published work, the collection Poems by Currer, Ellis, and Acton Bell, is issued in London. It sells just two copies in the first year.
- September 12 – Elizabeth Barrett and Robert Browning marry privately in St Marylebone Parish Church, London, departing for the continent a week later.

== Works published in English ==
=== United Kingdom ===
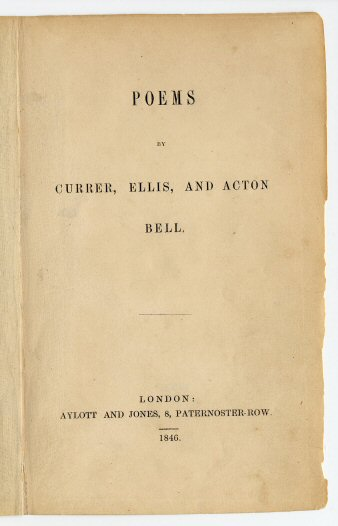
Cover of the first edition of Poems by Currer, Ellis, and Acton Bell, by the Brontë sisters

- William Barnes, Poems, Partly of Rural Life
- Robert Bell, ed., Ancient Poems, Ballads and Songs of the Peasantry of England
- Charlotte Brontë, Emily Brontë, and Anne Brontë, Poems by Currer, Ellis and Acton Bell
- Robert Browning, Luria: a Tragedy; a Soul's Tragedy, volume 8 of Bells and Pomegranates (see also Bells and Pomegranates 1841, 1842, 1843, 1844, and 1845)
- John Burgon, Petra: a poem, to which a few short poems are now added
- Henry Cary, Lives of English Poets, from Johnson to Kirke White, verse first published in the London Magazine from 1821 to 1824
- Thomas Hood, Poems
- John Keble, Lyra Innocentium: Thoughts in verse on Christian children
- Edward Lear, writing under the pen name "Derry Down Derry", A Book of Nonsense, also illustrated by Lear; expanded in 1855, 1861, 1863 etc. (See also, Nonsense Songs 1870, dated 1871, More Nonsense 1872, Laughable Lyrics 1877
- Carolina, Lady Nairne (died 1845), Lays from Strathern, Scottish

=== United States ===
- Oliver Wendell Holmes:
  - Urania: A Rhymed Lesson
  - Poems
- Elijah Kellogg, Spartacus to the Gladiators
- Henry Morford, The Rest of Don Juan
- John Godfrey Saxe, Progress: A Satirical Poem
- William Gilmore Simms, Areytos, or Songs of the South
- John Greenleaf Whittier, Voices of Freedom

== Works published in other languages ==
- Aleardo Aleardi, Lettere a Maria ("Letters to Mary"), Italy
- Gottfried Keller, Gedichte

== Births ==
Death years link to the corresponding "[year] in poetry" article:

- April 4 – Comte de Lautréamont, pen name of Isidore Lucien Ducasse (died 1870), French
- April 24 – Marcus Clarke (died 1881), Australian novelist and poet
- May 25 – Naim Frashëri (died 1900), Albanian
- August 17 – Alexander MacGregor Rose (died 1898), Scottish-born Canadian
- August 28 – G. H. Gibson, "Ironbark" (died 1921), Australian
- September 26 – Mary Hannay Foott (died 1918), Australian
- October 9 – Holger Drachmann (died 1908), Danish
- October 27 – Katherine Harris Bradley, half of "Michael Field" (died 1914), English

== Deaths ==
Birth years link to the corresponding "[year] in poetry" article:

- January 7 – John Hookham Frere (born 1769), English
- February 14 (probable date) – Standish O'Grady (born before 1793), Irish-Canadian poet and priest
- April 11 – Barron Field (born 1786), Anglo-Australian
- May 14 – Sarah Wentworth Apthorp Morton (born 1759), American
- November 23 – George Darley (born 1795), Irish-born

== See also ==
- 19th century in poetry
- 19th century in literature
- List of years in poetry
- List of years in literature
- Victorian literature
- French literature of the 19th century
- Biedermeier era of German literature
- Golden Age of Russian Poetry (1800–1850)
- Young Germany (Junges Deutschland) a loose group of German writers from about 1830 to 1850
- List of poets
- Poetry
- List of poetry awards
