= 1788 in poetry =

List of years in poetry	(table)
- … 1778; 1779; 1780; 1781; 1782; 1783; 1784; 1785; 1786; 1787; 1788; 1789; 1790; 1791; 1792; 1793; 1794; 1795; 1796; 1797; 1798 …
- In literature 1785 1786 1787 1788 1789 1790 1791
- Art; Archaeology; Architecture; Literature; Music; Philosophy; Science; +...

Nationality words link to articles with information on the nation's poetry or literature (for instance, Irish or France).

== Events ==
- December – Robert Burns writes his version of the Scots poem Auld Lang Syne.

== Works published in English ==
=== United Kingdom ===
This year three works of poetry, all written by women (the Falconars, More and Yearsley), condemn slavery; while Samuel Pratt is an early advocate of animal rights:

- Henry Cary, Sonnets and Odes, the author turns 16 years old this year
- William Collins, Ode on the Popular Superstitions of the Highlands of Scotland
- William Crowe, Lewesdon Hill, published anonymously
- Maria Falconar and Harriet Falconar:
  - Poems
  - Poems on Slavery
- James Hurdis, The Village Curate
- Robert Merry, writing under the pen name "Della Crusca", Diversity
- Hannah More, Slavery: A Poem
- "Peter Pindar", see John Wolcot, below
- Samuel Jackson Pratt, Sympathy
- William Whitehead, Poems by William Whitehead, published posthumously, edited by William Mason (see also Plays and Poems 1774)
- John Wolcot, writing under the pen name "Peter Pindar", Tales and Fables
- Ann Yearsley, A Poem on the Inhumanity of the Slave Trade

=== United States ===
- Timothy Dwight, published anonymously, "The Triumph of Infidelity: A Poem", satire in heroic couplets; supports Calvinism and attacks Voltaire, David Hume, Joseph Priestley and their followers
- Philip Freneau, Miscellaneous Works of Mr. Philip Freneau, Containing His Essays and Additional Poems
- Francis Hopkinson:
  - An Ode, in honor of the Adoption of the U.S. Constitution
  - Seven Songs, for the Harpsichord or Forte-Piano
- Peter Markoe:
  - "The Times", satire on prominent Philadelphia society people
  - "The Storm", attributed to Markoe
- William Roscoe, The Wrongs of Africa: A Poem
- Susanna Rowson:
  - Poems on Various Subjects
  - A Trip to Parnassus

== Works published in other languages ==
- Basilio da Gama, Relação abreviada da República e Lenitivo da saudade; Brazil
- Joseph Quesnel, Colas et Colinette, a comedy in verse, French language, published in Quebec, Canada

== Births ==
Death years link to the corresponding "[year] in poetry" article:

- January 22 – Lord Byron (died 1824), English poet and leading figure in Romanticism
- March 10 – Joseph von Eichendorff (died 1857), German poet and novelist
- May 16 – Friedrich Rückert (died 1866), German poet, translator and professor of Oriental languages
- June (day unknown) – Eliza Townsend (died 1854), American poet who published anonymously
- c. October 14 – Robert Millhouse (died 1839), English weaver poet
- October 24 – Sarah Josepha Hale (died 1879), American writer, influential editor, author of nursery rhymes, including "Mary Had a Little Lamb"
- December 6 – Richard H. Barham ("Thomas Ingoldsby") (died 1845), English poet, humorist and priest

== Deaths ==
Birth years link to the corresponding "[year] in poetry" article:

- March 29 – Charles Wesley (born 1707), English Methodist clergyman and hymn writer
- June 12 – Johann Andreas Cramer (born 1723), German poet, writer and theologian
- July 5 – Mather Byles, (born 1707), English Colonial American clergyman and poet
- July 31 – Thomas Russell (born 1762), English poet whose Sonnets and Miscellaneous Poems are posthumously published in 1789
- October 13 – Robert Nugent, 1st Earl Nugent (born 1709), Irish poet and politician
- October 28 – William Julius Mickle (born 1734), Scottish-born poet
- Giulio Variboba (born 1725), Arbëresh poet

== See also ==
- Poetry
