= 1782 in poetry =

List of years in poetry	(table)
- … 1772; 1773; 1774; 1775; 1776; 1777; 1778; 1779; 1780; 1781; 1782; 1783; 1784; 1785; 1786; 1787; 1788; 1789; 1790; 1791; 1792 …
- In literature 1779 1780 1781 1782 1783 1784 1785
- Art; Archaeology; Architecture; Literature; Music; Philosophy; Science; +...

Nationality words link to articles with information on the nation's poetry or literature (for instance, Irish or France).

== Events ==
- August 18 - English poet and artist William Blake marries Catherine Boucher at St Mary's Church, Battersea. In the same year, he meets his future patron, John Flaxman.

== Works published ==
=== United Kingdom ===
- William Cowper
  - The Diverting History of John Gilpin, published anonymously in the Public Advertiser on November 14 (published with The Task 1785)
  - Verses Supposed to be Written by Alexander Selkirk
  - Poems (see also Poems 1815)
- John Freeth, Modern Songs, on Various Subjects
- William Hayley, An Essay on Epic Poetry in Five Epistles to Mason
- William Mason:
  - An Archaeological Epistle to Jeremiah Milles ... Editor of a Superb Edition of the Poems of Thomas Rowley, attributed to Mason; written in the Rowleian dialect (see Thomas Chatterton's Poems, Supposed to Have Been Written ... by Thomas Rowley 1777)
  - King Stephen's Watch
- Hannah More, Sacred Dramas, Chiefly intended for Young Persons, published anonymously, went through 24 editions by 1829
- Edward Rushton, The Dismember'd Empire, published anonymously; attribution uncertain
- John Scott, The Poetical Works of John Scott
- John Walters, Translated Specimens of Welsh Poetry
- Joseph Warton, Essay on the Genius and Writings of Pope, Volume 2 (Volume 1 published in 1756), criticism
- Helen Maria Williams, Edwin and Eltruda
- John Wolcot writing under the pen name "Peter Pindar", Lyric Odes, to the Royal Academicians (see also More Lyric Odes 1783)

=== Other ===
- Jacques Delille, Les Jardins ("The Gardens"), France
- John Trumbull, M'Fingal: A Modern Epic Poem in Four Cantos, a satirical poem about American Tories during the American Revolution, is published in completed form (first two cantos published in 1778), United States
- Johann Wolfgang von Goethe, Die Fischerin (Singspiel, including "Der Erlkönig"), Germany

== Births ==
Death years link to the corresponding "[year] in poetry" article:

- January 30 - Ann Taylor (died 1866), English poet and literary critic
- September 19 - Richard Lower (died 1865), English dialect poet
- Irayimman Thampi (died 1856), Indian Carnatic music composer and poet

== Deaths ==
Birth years link to the corresponding "[year] in poetry" article:

- April 12 - Metastasio (born 1698), Italian poet and librettist
- August 27 - Henriette Louise von Hayn (born 1724), German hymn writer

== See also ==
- List of years in poetry
- List of years in literature
- 18th century in poetry
- 18th century in literature
- French literature of the 18th century
- Sturm und Drang (the conventional translation is "Storm and Stress"; a more literal translation, however, might be "storm and urge", "storm and longing", "storm and drive" or "storm and impulse"), a movement in German literature (including poetry) and music from the late 1760s through the early 1780s
- List of years in poetry
- Poetry
