= 1784 in poetry =

List of years in poetry	(table)
- … 1774; 1775; 1776; 1777; 1778; 1779; 1780; 1781; 1782; 1783; 1784; 1785; 1786; 1787; 1788; 1789; 1790; 1791; 1792; 1793; 1794 …
- In literature 1781 1782 1783 1784 1785 1786 1787
- Art; Archaeology; Architecture; Literature; Music; Philosophy; Science; +...

Nationality words link to articles with information on the nation's poetry or literature (for instance, Irish or France).

== Events ==
- About this year, the Sturm und Drang movement ended in German literature (including poetry) and music, which began in the late 1760s. The conventional translation is "Storm and Stress"; a more literal translation, however, might be "storm and urge", "storm and longing", "storm and drive" or "storm and impulse".
- Phillis Wheatley advertises in the September issue of The Boston Magazine for subscribers to a volume of poetry she proposes to publish, but the volume never appears, apparently for lack of support; United States

== Works published ==
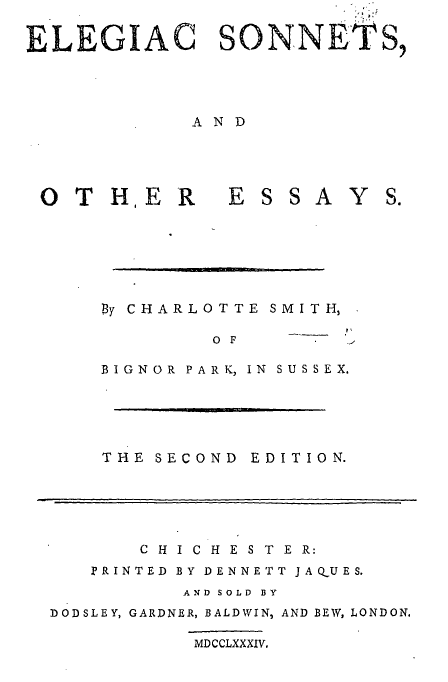
Frontespiece of Elegiac Sonnets by Charlotte Turner Smith

=== United Kingdom ===
- Anonymous, Rolliad
- Mary Alcock, The Air Balloon
- Thomas Chatterton, A Supplement to the Miscellanies of Thomas Chatterton, poetry and prose (see also, Miscellanies 1778), published posthumously (died 1770)
- Richard Jago, Poems, Moral and Descriptive
- Anna Seward, Louisa: A poetical novel
- Charlotte Turner Smith, Elegaic Sonnets, and Other Essays (see also Elegaic Sonnets 1797)
- Helen Maria Williams:
  - An Ode on the Peace
  - Peru

=== Other ===
- Évariste de Parny, Élégies, France

== Births ==
Death years link to the corresponding "[year] in poetry" article:

- January 31 – Bernard Barton (died 1849), English Quaker poet
- June 17 – Andrew Crosse (died 1855), English 'gentleman scientist' and poet
- May 18 – William Tennant (died 1848), Scottish poet
- July 27 – Denis Davydov (died 1839), Russian soldier-poet of the Napoleonic Wars, inventor of a specific genre — hussar poetry noted for its hedonism and bravado
- October 19 – Leigh Hunt (died 1859), English critic, essayist, poet and writer
- November 17 – Julia Nyberg (died 1854), Swedish poet and songwriter
- December 7 – Allan Cunningham (died 1842), Scottish poet and author

== Deaths ==
Birth years link to the corresponding "[year] in poetry" article:

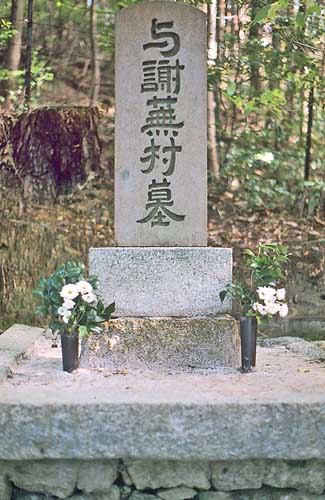
Yosa Buson's grave

- January 17 – Yosa Buson 与謝蕪村 (born 1716), Japanese, Edo period poet and painter; along with Matsuo Bashō and Kobayashi Issa, considered among the greatest poets of the Edo Period and one of the greatest haiku poets of all time (surname: Yosa)
- February 2 – Henry Alline (born 1748), American-born Canadian preacher and hymn-writer
- February 14 – Charlotta Löfgren (born 1720), Swedish poet
- March 17 – Anne Penny (born 1729), Welsh-born poet
- May 20 – Alexander Ross (born 1699), Scottish poet
- November 1 – Jean-Jacques Lefranc, Marquis de Pompignan (born 1709), French man of letters
- December 5 – Phillis Wheatley (born 1753), American poet, died in poverty while working on a second book of poetry, subsequently lost
- December 13 – Dr. Samuel Johnson (born 1709), English writer, poet, lexicographer, editor and literary critic
- Lê Quý Đôn (born 1726), Vietnamese, philosopher, poet, encyclopedist and government official

== See also ==
- List of years in poetry
- List of years in literature
- 18th century in poetry
- 18th century in literature
- 18th-century French literature
- List of years in poetry
- Poetry
