= 1771 in poetry =

List of years in poetry	(table)
- … 1761; 1762; 1763; 1764; 1765; 1766; 1767; 1768; 1769; 1770; 1771; 1772; 1773; 1774; 1775; 1776; 1777; 1778; 1779; 1780; 1781 …
- In literature 1768 1769 1770 1771 1772 1773 1774
- Art; Archaeology; Architecture; Literature; Music; Philosophy; Science; +...

Nationality words link to articles with information on the nation's poetry or literature (for instance, Irish or France).

== Events ==
- April 9 – Portuguese poet Pedro Correia Garção is arrested and committed to prison (where he will die) by Sebastião José de Carvalho e Melo, 1st Marquis of Pombal.
- English poet William Mason is employed to lay out a flower garden at Nuneham Courtenay in Oxfordshire by Viscount Nuneham.

== Works published ==
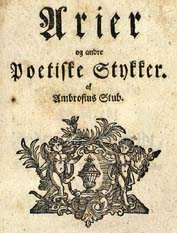
Frontispiece, book of poems by Ambrosius Stub

=== English Colonial America ===
- Jane Dunlap, Poems upon Several Sermons Preached by the Rev'd George Whitefield, Colonial Massachusetts
- Levi Frisbie, "A Poem on the Rise and Progress of Moor's Indian Charity School", English, Colonial America
- John Trumbull, "An Elegy on the Death of Mr. Buckingham St. John", English, Colonial America

=== United Kingdom ===
- James Beattie, The Minstrel; or, The Progress of Genius, Book 1, (Book 2: The English Garden 1774, in 4 volumes 1771–1781)
- James Cawthorn, Poems
- John Langhorne, The Fables of Flora
- Henry Mackenzie, Pursuits of Happiness, published anonymously after a stay in London; Scottish
- Thomas Percy, The Hermit of Warkworth, published anonymously
- Henry James Pye, The Triumph of Fashion
- John Wesley, The Works of the Rev. John Wesley, published in 32 volumes (1771–1774) by the Methodist divine and hymn writer
- Phillis Wheatley, an elegy to George Whitefield first published (shortly after his death) in Colonial America in 1770, where it received widespread acclaim. It was published within weeks of his death as a broadside in Boston, then in Newport, Rhode Island, then four more times in Boston and a dozen more times in New York, Philadelphia and Newport.

=== Other ===
- Ambrosius Stub, Arier og andre poetiske Stykker ("Arier and Other Poetic Works"), edited by T. S. Heiberg; Denmark, posthumous
- Christoph Martin Wieland, Der neue Amadis ("New Amadis"), a comic poem in 18 cantos; Germany

== Births ==
Death years link to the corresponding "[year] in poetry" article:

- March 21 – Thomas John Dibdin (died 1841), English dramatist and songwriter
- June 3 – Sydney Smith (died 1845), English writer, wit and Anglican clergyman
- August 15 – Walter Scott (died 1832), Scottish poet and historical novelist
- October 25 – Robert Lovell (died 1796), English poet
- November 4 – James Montgomery (died 1854), Scottish editor and poet
- November 11 – Thomas Green Fessenden, (died 1837), American
- December 25 – Dorothy Wordsworth (died 1855), English author, poet and diarist
- Bankidas Asiya (died 1833), Rajasthani poet and scholar
- Liang Desheng (died 1847), Chinese poet and writer during the Qing dynasty

== Deaths ==
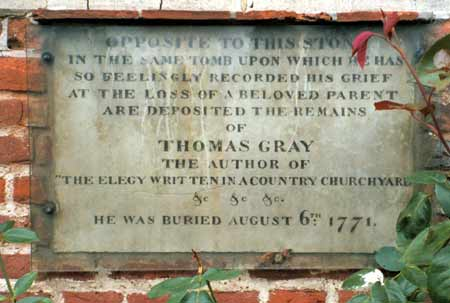
Tomb of Thomas Gray in Stoke Poges

Birth years link to the corresponding "[year] in poetry" article:

- July 30 – Thomas Gray (born 1716), English poet, classical scholar and professor at Cambridge University; died in Cambridge, then buried beside his mother in the churchyard of Stoke Poges, the setting for his famous 1750 poem, Elegy Written in a Country Churchyard, one of only 13 published in his lifetime
- May 21 – Christopher Smart (born 1722), English poet
- August 19 – Daniel Schiebeler (born 1741), German writer and poet
- September 13 – John Gambold (born 1711), Anglo-Welsh bishop of the Moravian church and poet
- September 17 – Tobias Smollett (born 1721), Scottish poet and author
- October 2 – James Plumptre (died 1832), English clergyman, dramatist and hymnodist
- December 23 – Johann Friedrich Löwen (born 1727), German poet, intellectual, drama theorist and at one time a confidant of Gotthold Ephraim Lessing
- Francis Williams (born 1702), black Jamaican scholar and poet

== See also ==
- List of years in poetry
- List of years in literature
- 18th century in poetry
- 18th century in literature
- French literature of the 18th century
- Sturm und Drang (the conventional translation is "Storm and Stress"; a more literal translation, however, might be "storm and urge", "storm and longing", "storm and drive" or "storm and impulse"), a movement in German literature (including poetry) and music from the late 1760s through the early 1780s
- List of years in poetry
- Poetry
