= James Fortescue =

James Fortescue may refer to:

- James Fortescue (politician) (1725–1782), Irish politician
- James Fortescue (poet) (1716–1777), English poet
