= 1847 in poetry =

List of years in poetry	(table)
- … 1837; 1838; 1839; 1840; 1841; 1842; 1843; 1844; 1845; 1846; 1847; 1848; 1849; 1850; 1851; 1852; 1853; 1854; 1855; 1856; 1857 …
- In literature 1844 1845 1846 1847 1848 1849 1850
- Art; Archaeology; Architecture; Literature; Music; Philosophy; Science; +...

Nationality words link to articles with information on the nation's poetry or literature (for instance, Irish or France).

== Events ==
- April
  - Robert Browning settles with his wife Elizabeth Barrett Browning in Florence
  - Young Romanian poet Vasile Alecsandri's beloved, Elena Negri, dies in his arms onboard a ship in the Mediterranean; he channels his mourning into a poem, "Steluța" ('Little Star')
- Between July and October – Rev. Henry Francis Lyte composes the hymn "Abide with Me" a few months before his death
- September 16 – William Shakespeare's house of birth in Stratford-upon-Avon in England is bought by the United Shakespeare Company for preservation; this year also, Schiller's house in Weimar is opened to the public as a museum

== Works published in English ==
=== United Kingdom ===
- Edwin Atherstone, The Fall of Nineveh, enlarged (from the 1828 edition) to 30 books
- Richard Harris Barham, writing under the pen name "Thomas Ingoldsby, Esq.", The Ingoldsby Legends; or, Mirth and Marvels, verse fiction; illustrated by George Cruikshank and John Leech (see also Ingoldsby Legends 1840, 1842)
- Caroline Clive, writing under the pen name "V", The Queen's Ball
- Walter Savage Landor, The Hellenics of Walter Savage Landor
- Mary Fawler Maude, "Thine for ever! God of love"
- Christina Rossetti, Verses by Christina G. Rossetti
- Percy Bysshe Shelley, The Works of Percy Bysshe Shelley, edited by Mary Shelley; posthumous
- Robert Southey and Caroline Southey, Robin Hood
- Alfred Tennyson's The Princess, including "Tears, Idle Tears"

=== United States ===
- William Ellery Channing, Poems, Second Series
- Philip Pendleton Cooke, Froissart Ballads, and Other Poems, Philadelphia: Cary and Hart
- Ralph Waldo Emerson, Poems
- Fitz-Greene Halleck, The Poetical Works of Fitz-Greene Halleck
- Charles Fenno Hoffman, Love's Calendar; Lays of the Hudson and Other Poems
- Henry Wadsworth Longfellow, Evangeline: A Tale of Acadie
- Epes Sargent, Songs of the Sea With Other Poems
- William Wetmore Story, Poems

== Works published in other languages ==
- Heinrich Heine, Atta Troll, German long narrative poem on political and cultural topics
- Raja Ali Haji or his sister Saleha, Syair Abdul Muluk, Malay syair
- Petar II Petrović-Njegoš, Prince-Bishop of Montenegro, The Mountain Wreath (Горски вијенац, Gorski vijenac), Serbian epic verse drama

== Births ==
Death years link to the corresponding "[year] in poetry" article:

- January 8 – Matei Donici (died 1921), Bessarabian Romanian poet and Imperial Russian Army general
- February 10 – Nabinchandra Sen নবীনচন্দ্র সেন (died 1909), Indian, Gujarati-language poet and writer
- April 7 – Jens Peter Jacobsen (died 1885), Danish poet
- September 22 –- Alice Meynell, née Thompson (died 1922), English poet, writer, editor, critic and suffragist
- December 1 – Julia A. Moore, the "Sweet Singer of Michigan" (died 1920), American poetaster
- Date not known – Brij Raj (died 1919), Indian, Dogri-Pahadi Brajbhasha poet

== Deaths ==
Birth years link to the corresponding "[year] in poetry" article:

- July 21 – William Shepherd (born 1768), English dissenting minister, politician, poet and writer
- September 10 – Richard Henry Wilde (born 1789), Irish-born American lawyer, politician and poet
- November 20 – Henry Francis Lyte (born 1793), Scottish-born English Anglican divine and hymn-writer
- December 30 – Sima Milutinović Sarajlija (born 1791), Bosnian–Serbian poet, hajduk, translator, historian, philologist, diplomat and adventurer
- Date not known – Liang Desheng (born 1771), Chinese poet and writer during the Qing Dynasty

== See also ==
- 19th century in poetry
- 19th century in literature
- List of years in poetry
- List of years in literature
- Victorian literature
- French literature of the 19th century
- Biedermeier era of German literature
- Golden Age of Russian Poetry (1800–1850)
- Young Germany (Junges Deutschland) a loose group of German writers from about 1830 to 1850
- List of poets
- Poetry
- List of poetry awards
