= 1769 in poetry =

List of years in poetry	(table)
- … 1759; 1760; 1761; 1762; 1763; 1764; 1765; 1766; 1767; 1768; 1769; 1770; 1771; 1772; 1773; 1774; 1775; 1776; 1777; 1778; 1779 …
- In literature 1766 1767 1768 1769 1770 1771 1772
- Art; Archaeology; Architecture; Literature; Music; Philosophy; Science; +...

Nationality words link to articles with information on the nation's poetry or literature (for instance, Irish or France).

== Events ==
- May – First publication of one of 16-year-old English poet Thomas Chatterton's poems attributed to the imaginary medieval monk "Thomas Rowley", "Elinoure and Juga", in Alexander Hamilton's Town and Country Magazine. This year also Chatterton sends specimens of "Rowley"’s poetry and history The Ryse of Peyncteynge yn Englade to Horace Walpole who at first offers to print them but, discovering Chatterton's age and rightly considering the pieces might be forgeries, later scornfully dismisses him.

== Works published ==
=== United Kingdom ===
- Mary Bowes, Countess of Strathmore and Kinghorne, The Siege of Jerusalem, drama
- Thomas Chatterton, "Elinoure and Juga"
- Thomas Gray, Ode Performed in the Senate-House at Cambridge, July 1, 1769
- Richard Hurd, Ancient and Modern Scots Songs
- John Ogilvie, Paradise, published anonymously
- Clara Reeve, Original Poems on several Occasions
- Tobias Smollett, The History and Adventures of an Atom, published anonymously

=== Other ===
- Jacques Delille, verse translation of Virgil's Georgics from the original Latin into French; the translation led to the author's award of the chair of Latin poetry at the Collège de France and membership in the Académie Française in 1774
- Basílio da Gama, O Uraguai, an epic Brazilian poem
- Jean-François, marquis de Saint-Lambert, Saisons, modeled on Thomson's Seasons
- Martin Wieland, Musarion, Germany

== Births ==
Death years link to the corresponding "[year] in poetry" article:

- May 21 – John Hookham Frere (died 1846), English diplomat, poet and author
- November 12 – Amelia Opie (died 1853), English novelist and poet
- December 7 (bapt.) – Ann Batten Cristall (died 1848), English poet
- December 26 – Ernst Moritz Arndt (died 1860), German patriotic author and poet
- Also:
  - Robert Hetrick (died 1849), Scottish poet and blacksmith
  - George Howe (died 1821), Saint Christopher Island-born Australian printer and poet

== Deaths ==
Birth years link to the corresponding "[year] in poetry" article:

- January 5 – James Merrick (born 1720), English poet and scholar
- January 20 – Sneyd Davies (born 1709), English poet and churchman
- November 27 – Kamo no Mabuchi 賀茂真淵 (born 1697), Japanese Edo period poet and philologist
- December 13 – Christian Fürchtegott Gellert (born 1715), German poet

== See also ==
- List of years in poetry
- List of years in literature
- 18th century in poetry
- 18th century in literature
- French literature of the 18th century
- Sturm und Drang (the conventional translation is "Storm and Stress"; a more literal translation, however, might be "storm and urge", "storm and longing", "storm and drive" or "storm and impulse"), a movement in German literature (including poetry) and music from the late 1760s through the early 1780s
- List of years in poetry
- Poetry
