= 1865 in poetry =

This article covers 1865 in poetry. Nationality words link to articles with information on the nation's poetry or literature (for instance, Irish or France).

== Works published in English ==
=== United Kingdom ===
- Matthew Arnold, Essays in Criticism, First Series, including "The Function of Criticism at the Present Time"
- Robert Browning, Poetical Works: Fourth Edition
- Robert Williams Buchanan, "The Session of the Poets," an attack on Algernon Charles Swinburne, published in The Spectator
- Lewis Carroll, Alice's Adventures in Wonderland, children's novel, including the prefatory poem "All in the golden afternoon..." and a number of nonsense verses
- Arthur Hugh Clough, Letters and Remains of Arthur Hugh Clough, including Dipsychus (see also Poems and Prose 1869), posthumously published
- Mary Wright Sewell, Mother's Last Words: a ballad
- Algernon Charles Swinburne:
  - Atalanta in Calydon
  - Chastelard

=== United States ===
- Thomas Bailey Aldrich, Poems
- Fitz-Greene Halleck, Young America: A Poem
- Oliver Wendell Holmes, Humorous Poems
- George Moses Horton, Naked Genius; this year, Horton, a slave, gains his liberty, publishes the book in Raleigh, North Carolina, and moves to Philadelphia
- Henry Wadsworth Longfellow:
  - Translator, The Divine Comedy of Dante Alighieri, two volumes (Volume 2 in 1867)
  - Household Poems
- James Russell Lowell, Ode Recited at the Commemoration of the Living and Dead Soldiers of Harvard University
- John Godfrey Saxe, Clever Stories of Many Nations Rendered in Rhyme
- Richard Henry Stoddard, Abraham Lincoln: An Horation Ode
- Samuel Ward, Lyrical Recreations
- Walt Whitman:
  - Drum-Taps, a collection of poems on the American Civil War, published in April
  - Sequel to Drum-Taps, a collection of 18 poems mourning the assassination of Abraham Lincoln, including "O Captain! My Captain!" and "When Lilacs Last in the Dooryard Bloom'd", published in Autumn

=== Other in English ===
- Charles Harpur, The Tower of a Dream, verse pamphlet, Australia
- Charles Heavysege, Jephthah's Daughter, Canada

== Works published in other languages ==
- Giosuè Carducci, "Inno a Satana", Italy
- Victor Hugo, Les Chansons des rues et des bois, France
- Pamphile Lemay, Essais poétiques; French language; Canada
- Uilleam Mac Dhun Lèibhe (William Livingston), Duain agus Orain, collection, Scottish Gaelic poet published in Scotland
- Sully Prudhomme, Stances et poèmes, France
- Rimes et Poësies Jersiaises, Jersey

== Births ==
Death years link to the corresponding "[year] in poetry" article:

- March – Edward Dyson (died 1931), Australian
- March 20 – Arthur Bayldon (died 1958), Australian
- March 23 – Madison Cawein (died 1914), American
- March 27 – Marion Angus (died 1946), Scots language poet
- April 9 – Adela Florence Nicolson, née Cory ("Lawrence Hope"; died 1904), English
- May 2 – William Gay (died 1897), Scottish-born Australian
- May 5 – Helen Maud Merrill (died 1943), American
- May 15 – Albert Verwey (died 1937), Dutch
- May 20 – Henry Ernest Boote (died 1949), English-born Australian
- June 13 – W. B. Yeats (died 1939), Irish poet and playwright
- July 18 – Dowell O'Reilly (died 1923), Australian
- July 21 (or 1868?) – Thomas William Hodgson Crosland (died 1924), English writer and poet
- August 16 – Mary Gilmore (died 1962), Australian poet and journalist
- September 12 – Sophus Claussen (died 1931), Danish
- September 21 – Francis Kenna (died 1932), Australian
- December 30
  - Rudyard Kipling (died 1936), Indian-born English novelist, writer and poet
  - Emily Julian McManus (died 1918), Canadian poet, author, and educator
- Also:
  - Kunjikuttan Thampuran (died 1913), Indian, Malayalam-language poet
  - Samuel Williamson (died 1936), Australian

== Deaths ==
Birth years link to the corresponding "[year] in poetry" article:

- May 1 – Isaac Williams (born 1802), English writer, poet and clergyman
- June 10 – Mrs. Lydia Sigourney, the "Sweet Singer of Hartford" (born 1791), American poet and writer of conduct books
- August 4 – William Edmondstoune Aytoun (born 1813), Scottish lawyer and poet
- September 5 – Hannah Flagg Gould (born 1789), American poet
- September 29 – Richard Lower (born 1782), English dialect poet
- October 15 – Andrés Bello (born 1781), Venezuelan humanist, diplomat, poet, legislator, philosopher, educator and philologist
- November 9 – George Arnold (born 1834), American writer, poet and artist
- November 18 – Joseph Déjacque (born 1821), French anarchist and poet

== See also ==
- 19th century in poetry
- 19th century in literature
- List of years in poetry
- List of years in literature
- Victorian literature
- French literature of the 19th century
- Poetry
