= 1841 in poetry =

The year's at the spring,
And day's at the morn;
Morning's at seven;
The hill-side's dew-pearled;
The lark's on the wing;
The snail's on the thorn;
God's in his Heaven -
All's right with the world!

— Robert Browning, Pippa Passes, published this year

Nationality words link to articles with information on the nation's poetry or literature (for instance, Irish or France).

== Events ==
- January – Elizabeth Barrett Browning is given her golden Cocker Spaniel "Flush" by writer Mary Russell Mitford.
- July 20 – English "peasant poet" absconds from an asylum for the insane at High Beach in Essex and walks 90 miles (140 km) to his home at Northborough in the east midlands. In late December he is admitted to Northampton General Lunatic Asylum where he will spend the remaining 23 years of his life.
- Victor Hugo is elected to the Académie Française, on his fifth attempt.

== Works published in English ==
=== United Kingdom ===
- Sarah Fuller Adams, Vivia Perpetua: A dramatic poem
- Robert Browning, Pippa Passes, verse drama
- W. J. Fox, Hymns and Anthems, 150 numbered hymns without music, 13 by Sarah Fuller Adams, including "Nearer, my God, to thee"; anthology
- Thomas Moore, The Poetical Works of Thomas Moore, in 10 volumes, published starting in 1840 and ending this year; Irish poet published in the United Kingdom
- Samuel Laman Blanchard Life and Literary Remains of L. E. L. (Letitia Elizabeth Landon) including Castruccio Castracani (a 5-act tragedy in verse), The Female Picture Gallery (prose) and the poetry collection Subjects for Pictures

=== United States ===
- Ralph Waldo Emerson:
  - "Compensation"
  - "The Sphinx", first published in The Dial this year, it was later included in Emerson's Poems 1847
- William Davis Gallagher, editor, Selections from the Poetical Literature of the West, one of the earliest American regional poetry anthologies; includes poems by 38 writers in the West, including Gallagher's own very popular poem, "Miami Woods"
- Charles Follen, Works, poetry and prose, published this year and in 1842
- Henry Wadsworth Longfellow's Ballads and other Poems, including "The Wreck of the Hesperus", "The Village Blacksmith", "Elcelsior" and "The Skeleton in Armor"
- James Russell Lowell, A Year's Life
- Cornelius Mathews, Wakondah; The Master of Life, a narrative poem about prehistoric Native Americans
- Frances Sargent Osgood, The Poetry of Flowers and the Flowers of Poetry
- Adrien Rouquette, Les savanes
- Lydia Howard Sigourney:
  - Pocahontas, and Other Poems, New York: Harper & Brothers
  - Poems, Religious and Elegiac
- Seba Smith, Powhatan

=== Other in English ===
- Thomas Moore, The Poetical Works of Thomas Moore, in 10 volumes, published starting in 1840 and ending this year; Irish poet published in the United Kingdom
- Standish O'Grady, The Emigrant, a long narrative poem, Irish-born Canadian

== Works published in other languages ==
- Mikhail Lermontov, The Demon: An Eastern Tale, Russia
- Frederik Paludan-Müller:
  - Adam Homo, three-volume novel in verse, published starting this year to 1848, Denmark
  - Venus
- Betty Paoli, Gedichte ("Poems"), Austria
- Alexander Pushkin, The Bronze Horseman, Russia
- Henrik Wergeland, Svalen ("The Swallow"), Norway
- José Zorrilla, Cantos del trovador, Spain

== Births ==
Death years link to the corresponding "[year] in poetry" article:

- March 10 – Ina Donna Coolbrith (died 1928), American
- March 21 – Mathilde Blind ("Claude Lake"), born Mathilde Cohen (died 1896 in poetry), German-born English
- March 31 – Iosif Vulcan (died 1907), Romanian magazine editor, poet, playwright, novelist and cultural figure
- April 6 – Ivan Surikov (died 1898), Russian
- April 29 – Edward Rowland Sill (died 1887), American
- May 22 – Catulle Mendès (died 1909), French
- August 18 – Robert Williams Buchanan (died 1901), Scottish
- December 30 – Charles E. Carryl (died 1920), American

== Deaths ==
Birth years link to the corresponding "[year] in poetry" article:

- February 19 – Ulrika Widström (born 1764), Swedish poet and translator
- March 2 – George Dyer (born 1755), English classicist and writer
- May 20 – Joseph Blanco White (born 1775), Spanish-born English theologian and poet
- June 1 – Robert Allan (born 1774), Scottish weaver poet, in New York
- July 27 – Mikhail Lermontov (born 1814), Russian poet, dramatist, fiction writer and painter, in duel
- August 24 – Bjarni Thorarensen (born 1786), Icelandic poet and official
- September 16 – Thomas John Dibdin (born 1771), English playwright and songwriter

== See also ==
- 19th century in poetry
- 19th century in literature
- List of years in poetry
- List of years in literature
- Victorian literature
- French literature of the 19th century
- Biedermeier era of German literature
- Golden Age of Russian Poetry (1800–1850)
- Young Germany (Junges Deutschland) a loose group of German writers from about 1830 to 1850
- List of poets
- Poetry
- List of poetry awards
