= 1869 in poetry =

Nationality words link to articles with information on the nation's poetry or literature (for instance, Irish or France).

== Events ==
- October 5 – Model, poet and artist Elizabeth Siddal (d. 1862) is exhumed by Charles Augustus Howell at Highgate Cemetery in London in order to recover the manuscript of Dante Gabriel Rossetti's Poems buried with her.

== Works published in English ==
=== United Kingdom ===
- Robert Browning, The Ring and the Book, Volumes 3 and 4 (Volume 3 published in January, Volume 4 in February; see also The Ring and the Book 1868)
- C. S. Calverley, Theocritus Translated into English Verse
- A. H. Clough, Poems and Prose Remains (see also Letters 1865)
- W. S. Gilbert, Bab Ballads, first published in Fun, a comic journal (see also More 'Bab' Ballads 1872)
- John Keble, Miscellaneous Poems
- William Morris, The Earthly Paradise, Part 3 (published this year, although the book states "1870"; Parts 1 and 2 1868; Part 4 1870)
- Dante Gabriel Rossetti, Poems
- Alfred Lord Tennyson, The Holy Grail, and Other Poems, with "The Coming of Arthur," "The Holy Grail," "Pelleas and Ettarre," and "The Passing of Arthur" (published this year, although the book states "1870"; see also Idylls of the King 1859, 1870, 1889, "The Last Tournament" 1871, Gareth and Lynette 1872, "Balin and Balan" in Tiresias 1885)

=== United States ===
- William Cullen Bryant:
  - Hymns
  - Some Notices of the Life and Writings of Fitz-Greene Halleck
- William Dean Howells, No Love Lost: A Romance of Travel
- James Russell Lowell, Under the Willows and Other Poems
- Joaquin Miller, Joaquin et al.
- Edmund Clarence Stedman, The Blameless Prince and Other Poems
- John Greenleaf Whittier, Among the Hills

=== Other ===
- Dutt Family, Dutt Family Album, London: Longmans, Green and Co.; India, Indian poetry in English
- Charles Heavysege, Saul: A Drama in Three Parts, second edition, revised (see also Saul, first edition, 1857); Canada
- Henry Kendall, Leaves from Australian Forests, Australia

== Works published in other languages ==
=== France ===
- Charles Baudelaire, published posthumously (died 1867):
  - L'Art romantique
  - Le Spleen de Paris/Petits Poémes en Prose ("Paris Spleen"), 51 short prose poems
- Comte de Lautréamont, Les Chants de Maldoror
- Paul Verlaine, Les Fêtes galantes

=== Other ===
- Jan Neruda, Zpěvy páteční ("Friday Songs"), Czech

== Births ==
Death years link to the corresponding "[year] in poetry" article:

- February 11 – Else Lasker-Schüler (died 1945), German
- May 12 – Frank Morton (died 1923), English-born Australian poet and journalist
- May 23 – Olivia Ward Bush-Banks, née Ward (died 1944), African-American author, poet and journalist
- June 10 – Arthur Shearly Cripps (died 1952), English Anglican priest, short story writer and poet spending most of his life in Southern Rhodesia (modern-day Zimbabwe)
- July 8 – William Vaughn Moody (died 1910), American
- August 6:
  - Marie E. J. Pitt (died 1948), Australian poet, journalist and political activist
  - David McKee Wright (died 1928), Irish-born poet and journalist, active in New Zealand and Australia
- August 7 – E. J. Brady (died 1952), Australian poet, wharf clerk, farmer and journalist; founder of the artist colony at Mallacoota, Victoria in Australia
- August 10 – Laurence Binyon (died 1943), English poet, dramatist and art scholar
- August 21 – Will H. Ogilvie (died 1963), Scottish-Australian narrative poet and horseman
- October 6 – Bo Bergman (died 1967), Swedish writer and critic
- November 15
  - Charlotte Mew (suicide 1928), English
  - Arnold Wall (died 1966), Ceylonese-born New Zealand philologist, poet, botanist and radio broadcaster
- November 20 – Zinaida Gippius (died 1945), Russian poet, novelist and playwright
- December 1 – George Sterling (died 1926), American
- December 22 – Edwin Arlington Robinson (died 1935), American Pulitzer Prize-winning poet
- December 30 – Stephen Leacock (died 1944), English-born Canadian humorist and political scientist
- Also:
  - Miltiadis Malakasis (died 1943), Greek
  - Balawantrai Thakore (died 1952), the first Imagist and formalist poet in Indian, Gujarati-language literature; introduced into Gujarati the sonnet and prithvi meter, "which is closest to English blank verse", according to The Handbook of Twentieth-Century Indian Literature

== Deaths ==
Birth years link to the corresponding "[year] in poetry" article:

- January 30 – Charlotte Alington Barnard (born 1830), English poet and composer of ballads and hymns
- February 15 – Mirza Ghalib (born 1797), classical Urdu and Persian poet from India
- February 28 – Alphonse de Lamartine (born 1790), French writer, poet and politician
- November 3 – Andreas Kalvos (born 1792), Greek

== See also ==
- 19th century in poetry
- 19th century in literature
- List of years in poetry
- List of years in literature
- Victorian literature
- French literature of the 19th century
- Poetry
