= 1867 in poetry =

Nationality words link to articles with information on the nation's poetry or literature (for instance, Irish or France).

== Events ==
- The first blue plaque is erected in London by the Royal Society of Arts on the birthplace (1788) of English poet Lord Byron, subsequently demolished.

== Works published in English ==
=== Canada ===
- Charles Heavysege, "Jezebel," New Dominion Monthly (Montreal)

=== United Kingdom ===
- Matthew Arnold, New Poems, including "Dover Beach"
- Philip James Bailey, Universal Hymn (see also Festus 1839)
- Mathilde Blind, publishing under the pen name "Claude Lake", Poems
- Jean Ingelow, A Story of Doom, and Other Poems
- Ellen Johnston, "the 'factory girl'", Autobiography, Poems and Songs (Scotland)
- William Morris, The Life and Death of Jason
- Algernon Charles Swinburne, Song of Italy
- Augusta Webster, A Woman Sold, and Other Poems

=== United States ===
- George Arnold, Poems, Grave and Gay, published posthumously
- John Burroughs, Notes on Walt Whitman as Poet and Person, biography and criticism
- Ralph Waldo Emerson, May-Day and Other Pieces
- Bret Harte, The Lost Galleon
- Josiah Gilbert Holland, Kathrina: Her Life and Mine, in a Poem
- Emma Lazarus, Poems and Translations
- Henry Wadsworth Longfellow, Flower-de-Luce
- James Russell Lowell, The Biglow Papers, Second Series
- William Gilmore Simms, editor, War Poetry of the South
- Harriet Beecher Stowe, Religious Poems
- Rose Hartwick Thorpe, Curfew Must Not Ring Tonight
- Henry Timrod, "Ode: Sung on the Occasion of Decorating the Graves of the Confederate Dead at Magnolia Cemetery, Charleston, S.C., 1867"
- Walt Whitman, Leaves of Grass, fourth edition (first edition 1855)
- John Greenleaf Whittier, The Tent on the Beach

=== Other in English ===
Australia:

- Adam Lindsay Gordon
  - Ashtaroth, a Dramatic Lyric
  - Sea Spray and Smoke Drift
- Henry Kendall – "Bell-Birds"

== Works published in other languages ==
=== France ===
- François Coppée, Les Intimites and Poemes modernes, published from this year to 1869
- Alfred de Vigny, Journal d’un poète ("Journal of a Poet"), posthumously published

=== Other ===
- Lydia Koidula, Emajõe Ööbik ("The Nightingale of the Mother River"), Estonia
- Jan Neruda, Knihy veršů ("Books of Verses"), Czech
- Piet Paaltjens (François Haverschmidt), Snikken en grimlachjes: poëzie uit den studententijd ("Sobs and Bitter Grins: poetry of student days"), Netherlands

== Births ==
Death years link to the corresponding "[year] in poetry" article:

- February 9 – Natsume Sōseki 夏目 漱石 (commonly referred to as "Sōseki"), pen name of Natsume Kinnosuke 夏目金之助 (died 1916), Japanese, Meiji Era novelist, haiku poet, composer of Chinese-style poetry, writer of fairy tales and a scholar of English literature; from 1984–2004, his portrait appears on the 1000 yen note (surname: Natsume)
- March 2 – Louis Lavater (died 1953), Australian
- March 15 – Lionel Pigot Johnson (died 1902), English
- April 10 – George William Russell "Æ" (died 1935), Irish
- June 5 - Paul-Jean Toulet (died 1920), French
- June 17 – Henry Lawson (died 1922), Australian
- August 2 – Ernest Dowson (died 1900), English poet, novelist and writer of short stories associated with the Decadent movement
- August 13 – Rudolf G. Binding (died 1938), Swiss-born German
- September 17 – Masaoka Shiki 正岡 子規, pen-name of Masaoka Tsunenori 正岡 常規, who changes his name to Noboru 升 (died 1902), Japanese author, poet, literary critic, journalist and, early in his life, a baseball player (surname: Masaoka)
- November 8 – Sadakichi Hartmann (died 1944), American
- November 26 – Roderic Quinn (died 1949), Australian

== Deaths ==
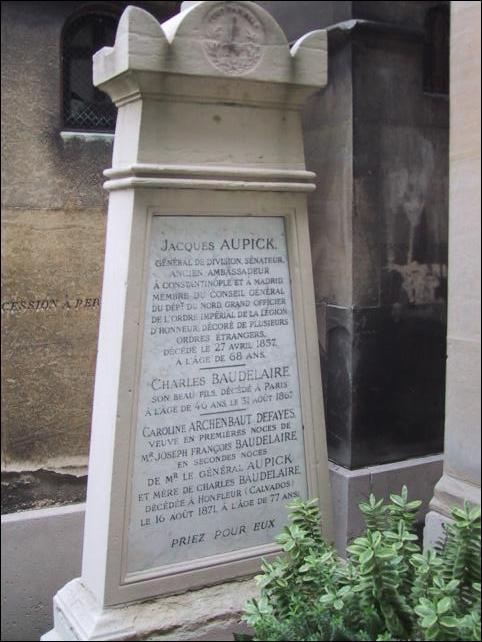
Tomb of Charles Baudelaire

Birth years link to the corresponding "[year] in poetry" article:

- January 5? – Alexander Smith (born 1829), Scottish Spasmodic poet
- January 20 – Nathaniel Parker Willis (born 1806), American author, poet and editor
- February 2 – Forceythe Willson (born 1837), American poet
- February 23 – Pietro Zorutti (Pieri Çorut, born 1792), Friulian poet
- August 31 – Charles Baudelaire (born 1821), French poet, critic and translator
- October 7 – Henry Timrod (born 1829), American poet
- November 19 – Fitz-Greene Halleck (born 1790), American poet
- John Hollin Ridge (born 1827), American poet

== See also ==
- 19th century in poetry
- 19th century in literature
- List of years in poetry
- List of years in literature
- Victorian literature
- French literature of the 19th century
- Poetry
