= 1776 in philosophy =

1776 in philosophy

== Publications ==
- Adam Smith, The Wealth of Nations (1776)
- Thomas Paine, Common Sense (1776)
- United States Declaration of Independence

== Births ==
Sophie Germain

== Deaths ==
- August 25 - David Hume (born 1711)
