= 1844 in poetry =

This article covers 1844 in poetry. Nationality words link to articles with information on the nation's poetry or literature (for instance, Irish or France).

== Works published in English ==
=== United Kingdom ===
- Isabella Banks, Ivy Leaves, including "Neglected Wife"
- William Barnes, Poems of Rural Life in the Dorset Dialect
- Frances Browne, The Star of Atteghei; The Vision of Schwartz, and Other Poems
- Elizabeth Barrett (later Elizabeth Barrett Browning), Poems, including "A Drama of Exile" and ballads
- Sir Francis Hastings Doyle, The Two Destinies
- Frederick William Faber, Sir Lancelot
- Leigh Hunt, What is Poetry?, critical essay
- Monckton Milnes, Palm Leaves
- Coventry Patmore, Poems

=== United States ===
- Lydia Maria Child – "Over the River and Through the Wood"
- James Freeman Clarke, Hymn Book for the Church of the Disciples (expanded edition, 1852)
- Christopher Pearse Cranch, Poems
- Samuel Henry Dickson, Poems, including his popular "I Sigh for the Land of the Cypress and Pine"
- Ralph Waldo Emerson, The Poet an essay of literary criticism in Essays, Second Series
- Rufus Wilmot Griswold, The Poets and Poetry of England in the Nineteenth Century, anthology
- Charles Fenno Hoffman, The Echo
- William H. C. Hosmer, Yonnonidio, or Warriors of the Genesee
- Sarah Anna Lewis, Records of the Heart
- Henry Wadsworth Longfellow, editor, Poets and Poetry of Europe, anthology
- James Russell Lowell, Poems
- Epes Sargent, The Light of the Lighthouse and Other Poems
- Lydia Maria Child, Flowers for Children, Volume 2, including "Over the River and Through the Woods", which was later set to music
- Bayard Taylor, Ximena; or, The Battle of the Sierra Morena and Other Poems

== Works published in other languages ==
- Aleardo Aleardi, l' Arnalda di Roca ("Rock of Arnalda"), Italy
- Heinrich Heine, German poet and author living in France:
  - Neue Gedichte ("New Poems")
  - Deutschland Ein Wintermarchen, long narrative poem on political and topics
- Frederik Paludan-Müller, Denmark:
  - Dryadens bryllup ("The Dryad's Wedding")
  - Tithon ("Tithonus")
  - Abels Død ("The Death of Abel")
- Henrik Wergeland, Norway:
  - Den Engelske Lods ("The English Pilot")
  - Jødinden ("The Jewess")

== Births ==
Death years link to the corresponding "[year] in poetry" article:

- February 8 – Richard Watson Gilder (died 1909), American poet and editor
- March 14 – Arthur O'Shaughnessy (died 1881), English poet and herpetologist
- March 30 – Paul Verlaine (died 1896), French Symbolistt poet
- March 31 – Andrew Lang (died 1912), Scottish writer
- June 28 – John Boyle O'Reilly (died 1890), Irish-born American poet, journalist and fiction writer
- July 21 – Matilda Maranda Crawford (died 1920), American-Canadian poet, writer, correspondent
- July 28 – Gerard Manley Hopkins (died 1889), English poet and Jesuit priest
- October 12 – George Washington Cable (died 1925), American novelist
- October 13 – Ernest Myers (died 1921), English poet and classicist
- October 23
  - Robert Bridges (died 1939), English Poet Laureate
  - Laura Rosamond White (died 1922), American poet, author, and editor
- November 12 – Ismail Merathi (died 1917), Indian poet from Mughal and British era
- November 21 – Ada Cambridge (died 1926), English writer and poet living in Australia after 1870
- Date not known:
  - Caroline Lindsay (died 1921), English
  - Venmani Mahan Namboodiri (died 1893), Indian, Malayalam-language poet associated with the Venmani School of poetry
  - Arabella Eugenia Smith (died 1916), American

== Deaths ==
Death years link to the corresponding "[year] in poetry" article:

- March 6 – Sumner Lincoln Fairfield, (born 1803), American poet and teacher
- June 15 – Thomas Campbell (born 1777), Scottish poet especially of sentimental poetry dealing with human affairs
- November 21 – Ivan Krylov (1769), Russian fabulist
- Date not known – Margaret Miller Davidson, senior (born 1787), American novelist, mother of poets Lucretia Maria Davidson, Margaret Miller Davidson and Levi P. Davidson

== See also ==
- 19th century in poetry
- 19th century in literature
- List of years in poetry
- List of years in literature
- Victorian literature
- French literature of the 19th century
- Biedermeier era of German literature
- Golden Age of Russian Poetry (1800–1850)
- Young Germany (Junges Deutschland) a loose group of German writers from about 1830 to 1850
- List of poets
- Poetry
- List of poetry awards
