= James Fortescue (poet) =

English poet

James Fortescue, D.D. (1716–1777), was an English poet.

Fortescue was born in 1716, the son of George Fortescue, "gentleman", of Milton Abbot, Devon. He matriculated at Oxford as a member of Exeter College, 9 February 1732–3, obtained his B.A. in 1736, was elected a fellow of his college, and commenced M.A. in 1739. He was chaplain at Merton College, Oxford, in 1738, 1743, and 1746. In 1748 he was senior proctor of the university. He graduated B.D. in 1749, and was created D.D. on 20 January 1750–1. Being appointed in 1764 to the rectory of Wootton, Northamptonshire, a benefice in the gift of Exeter College, he resigned his fellowship in the following year. He held the rectory till his death in 1777.

He published the following works in verse:

1. 'A View of Life in its several Passions, with a preliminary Discourse on Moral Writing,’ London, 1749, 8vo.
2. 'Science,’ an epistle, Oxford, 1750, 8vo.
3. 'Science,’ a poem, Oxford, 1751, 8vo.
4. 'Essays, Moral and Miscellaneous,’ including the preceding works, and some other poetical pieces, pt. i. second edit., London, 1752, 8vo; pt. ii. Oxford, 1754, 8vo. An extended edition of the 'Essays,’ including 'Pomery-Hill,’ appeared in 2 vols. 1759.
5. 'An Essay on Sacred Harmony,’ London, 1753, 8vo.
6. 'Essay the Second: on Sacred Harmony,’ London, 1754, 8vo.
7. 'Pomery-Hill, a Poem, with other Poems, English and Latin,’ London, 1754, 8vo.
