= 1777 in literature =

This article contains information about the literary events and publications of 1777.

== Events ==
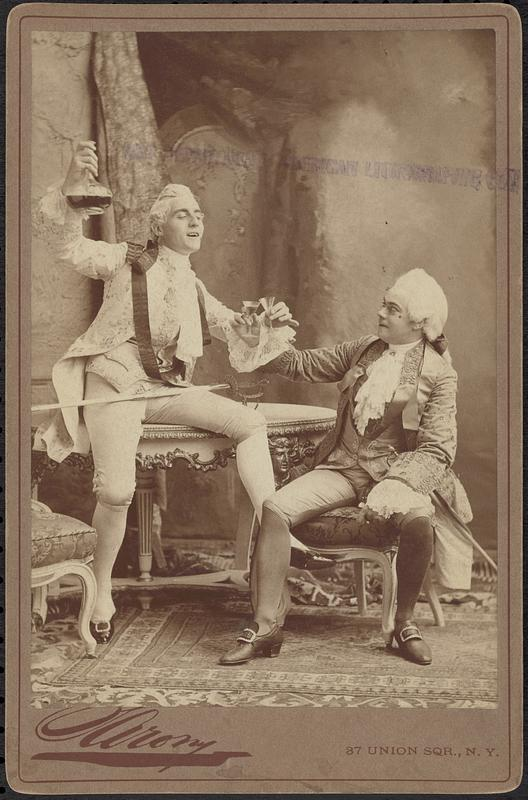
A scene from The School for Scandal, ca. 1891–1895. Cabinet Card Collection, Boston Public Library

- February 8 – Thomas Chatterton's volume Poems, Supposed to Have Been Written at Bristol, by Thomas Rowley, and Others, in the Fifteenth Century is published anonymously and posthumously in London, edited by Thomas Tyrwhitt, who still at this time believes them to be genuine work by a medieval monk transcribed by Chatterton.
- March – Fanny Burney is introduced to Samuel Johnson by her father, Charles Burney.
- April 1 – Friedrich Maximilian Klinger's play Sturm und Drang is premièred by the Seyler theatrical company in Leipzig. It gives its name to the Sturm und Drang movement in German literature.
- April 12 – The poet and grammarian Robert Lowth is appointed Bishop of London.
- May 8 – The first performance of Richard Brinsley Sheridan's comedy of manners The School for Scandal takes place at the Theatre Royal, Drury Lane in London.
- October – James Boswell's essays first appear as a column called The Hypochondriak in The London Magazine.
- unknown date
  - Homeric Hymns manuscript 'M' (or Codex Mosquensis, copied by John Eugenikos in the first half of the fifteenth century, possibly in Constantinople or Italy, and preserving both the Hymn to Demeter and the first Hymn to Dionysus) is rediscovered by German philologist Christian Frederick Matthaei in a barn outside Moscow (Russian Empire).
  - Det Dramatiske Selskab is founded in Copenhagen (Denmark) as an acting academy.

== New books ==
=== Fiction ===
- Frances Brooke – The Excursion
- Henry Mackenzie – Julia de Roubigne
- Samuel Jackson Pratt
  - Charles and Charlotte
  - (as Courtney Melmoth) Travels for the Heart
- Clara Reeve (anonymously) – The Champion of Virtue
- Lady Mary Walker
  - Letters from the Duchesse de Crui
  - Memoirs of the Marchioness de Louvoi

=== Drama ===
- Charles Dibdin – The Quaker
- Johann Wolfgang von Goethe – Iphigenie auf Tauris
- John O'Keeffe – The Shamrock
- Richard Brinsley Sheridan
  - The School for Scandal
  - A Trip to Scarborough
- Nicolás Fernández de Moratín – Guzman el Bueno
- Hannah More – Percy (prologue and epilogue by David Garrick)
- Arthur Murphy – Know Your Own Mind
- Friedrich Maximilian Klinger – Sturm und Drang

=== Poetry ===
- Thomas Chatterton – Poems
- William Combe
  - The Diaboliad
  - The First of April
- Thomas Day – The Desolation of America
- William Dodd – Thoughts in Prison
- William Roscoe – Mount Pleasant
- Thomas Warton – Poems
- Paul Whitehead – Poems
- Nicolás Fernández de Moratín – Las naves de Cortés destruidas

=== Non-fiction ===
- Hugh Blair – Sermons
- Jacques-François Blondel – Cours d'architecture ou traité de la décoration, distribution et constructions des bâtiments contenant les leçons données en 1750, et les années suivantes, vol. 9
- Edmund Burke – Letter to the Sheriffs of Bristol
- James Cook – A Voyage Toward the South Pole
- Georg Forster – A Voyage Round the World in His Britannic Majesty's Sloop Resolution, Commanded by Capt. James Cook, during the Years, 1772, 3, 4, and 5
- Nicolás Fernández de Moratín – Carta histórica sobre el origen y progresos de las fiestas de toros en España
- John Howard – The State of the Prisons in England and Wales
- David Hume – The Life of David Hume
- Hannah More – Essays
- Maurice Morgann – An Essay on the Dramatic Character of Sir John Falstaff
- Joseph Priestley
  - Disquisitions Relating to Matter and Spirit
  - The Doctrine of Philosophical Necessity Illustrated
- Isaac Reed – The Repository
- William Robertson – The History of America
- Philip Dormer Stanhope, 4th Earl of Chesterfield – Characters
- Johannes Nikolaus Tetens – Philosophische Versuche über die menschliche Natur und ihre Entwicklung (Philosophical Essays on Human Nature and Its Development)

== Births ==
- February – James Johnson, Irish surgeon and medical writer (died 1845)
- February 12 – Friedrich de la Motte Fouqué, German Romantic novelist (died 1843)
- February 16 – Maria Hack, English children's writer (died 1844)
- March 17 – Patrick Brontë, Irish Anglican minister and author, father of the writers Charlotte, Emily, and Anne Brontë (died 1861)
- June 3 – Antonio Gasparinetti, Italian poet, playwright and military officer (died 1824)
- July 27 – Thomas Campbell, Scottish poet (died 1844)
- October 18 – Heinrich von Kleist, German poet, dramatist, novelist, short story writer, and journalist (died 1811)

== Deaths ==
- February 3 – Hugh Kelly, Irish poet and dramatist (born 1739)
- September 24 (bur.) – James Fortescue, English poet (born 1716)
- October 12 (October 1 O.S.) – Alexander Sumarokov, Russian poet and dramatist (born 1717)
- October 21 – Samuel Foote, English dramatist (born 1720)
