= 1780 in literature =

This article contains information about the literary events and publications of 1780.

== Events ==
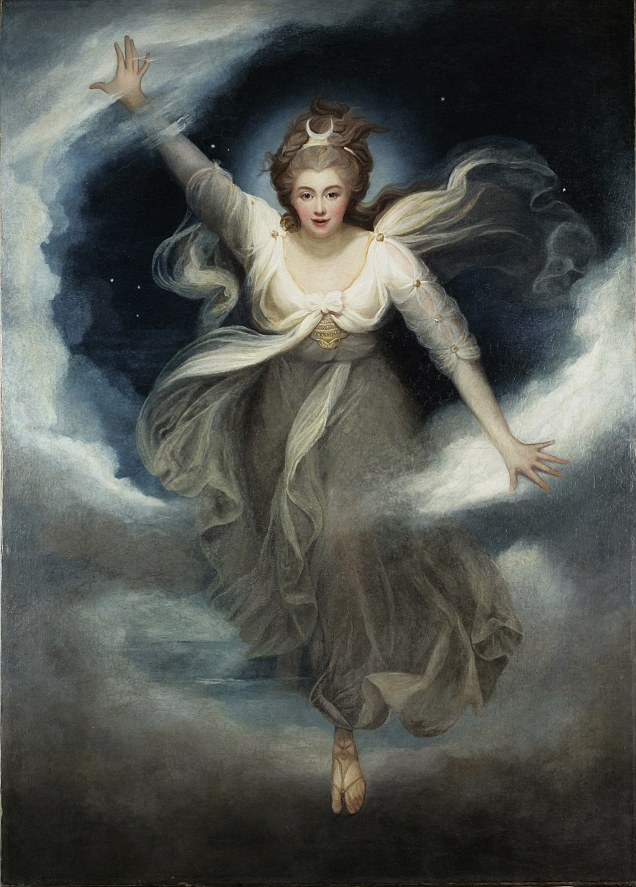
Duchess of Devonshire as Cynthia by Maria Cosway circa 1782. Georgiana Cavendish, Duchess of Devonshire depicted as a character from Spenser's Faerie Queene.

- September/October – Richard Brinsley Sheridan is elected to Parliament in the 1780 British general election.
- December – Karl von Marinelli becomes head of the Schultz theatre company (Schultzsche Gesellschaft) of Baden.
- unknown dates
  - Det Dramatiske Selskab in Christiania, an amateur acting troupe, is formed and gives the first regular stage performances in Norway.
  - A legal deposit law entitles the Załuski Library in Warsaw to a copy of every book published in the Polish–Lithuanian Commonwealth.

== New books ==
=== Fiction ===
- Elizabeth Blower – The Parsonage House
- Herbert Croft – Love and Madness
- Georgiana, Duchess of Devonshire – The Sylph
- Thomas Holcroft – Alwyn
- Samuel Jackson Pratt – Emma Corbett, or, The miseries of civil war

=== Children ===
- Mrs. Trimmer – An Easy Introduction to the Knowledge of Nature, and Reading the Holy Scriptures. Adapted to the Capacities of Children

=== Drama ===
- Hannah Cowley – The Belle's Stratagem
- Sophia Lee – The Chapter of Accidents
- Isaac Reed – A Select Collection of Old Plays (from Robert Dodsley's press)

=== Poetry ===
- Hannah Cowley – The Maid of Aragon
- George Crabbe – The Candidate
- Herbert Croft – The Abbey of Kilkhampton; or, Monumental Records for the Year 1980 (satire)
- Susannah Harrison – Songs in the Night
- William Hayley – An Essay on History
- Anna Seward – Elegy on Captain Cook
- Christoph Martin Wieland – Oberon

=== Non-fiction ===
- William Beckford – Biographical Memoirs of Extraordinary Painters
- Jacob Bryant – An Address to Dr. Priestley
- Edmund Burke – Speech on Oeconomical Reformation
- Giacomo Casanova – Opuscoli miscellanei (containing Il duello and Lettere della nobil donna Silvia Belegno alla nobil donzella Laura Gussoni)
- William Combe – Letters of the Late Lord Lyttelton (forgeries)
- Martin Madan – Thelyphthora (in favor of polygamy)
- Johannes von Müller – Geschichten der Schweizer
- John Nichols – A Select Collection of Poems
- Richard Price – An Essay on the Population of England
- Joseph Priestley – Letters to a Philosophical Unbeliever
- William Shakespeare – Supplement to the Edition of Shakespeare's Plays Published in 1778 by Samuel Johnson and George Steevens (by Edmond Malone)
- Horace Walpole – On Modern Gardening
- John Wesley – Reflections on the Rise and Progress of the American Rebellion
- Arthur Young – A Tour in Ireland

== Births ==
- March 6 – Lucy Barnes, American writer (died 1809)
- March 10 – Frances Trollope, English novelist (died 1863)
- June 1 – Carl von Clausewitz, German soldier and military historian and theorist (died 1831)
- June 3 – William Hone, English satirist (died 1842)
- August 14 – George Croly, Irish poet, novelist and historian (died 1860)
- November 27 – William Cardell, American grammarian and writer of boys' stories (died 1828)
- December 20 – John Wilson Croker, Irish statesman and author (died 1857)
- December 26 – Mary Somerville, Scottish science writer and polymath (died 1872)
- probable
  - Maria Elizabeth Budden, English novelist and writer of didactic children's books (died 1832)
  - Anna Maria Porter, English poet and novelist (died 1832)

== Deaths ==
- January 31 – Jonathan Carver, American explorer and writer (born 1710)
- February 14 – William Blackstone, English jurist and legal author (born 1723)
- February 17 – Andreas Felix von Oefele, German historian and librarian (born 1706)
- April 29 – Claude Joseph Dorat, "Le Chevalier Dorat", French poet and novelist (born 1734)
- May 11 – Nicolas Fernández de Moratín, Spanish literary reformer (born 1737)
- July 14 – Charles Batteux, French philosopher (born 1713)
- September 4 – Sir John Fielding, English social reformer and half-brother of Henry Fielding (born 1721)
- September 8 – Jeanne-Marie Leprince de Beaumont, French novelist (born 1711)
- September 23 – Marie Anne de Vichy-Chamrond, marquise du Deffand, French salon hostess (born 1697)
- December 22 – James Harris, English grammarian (born 1709)
