= 1775 in literature =

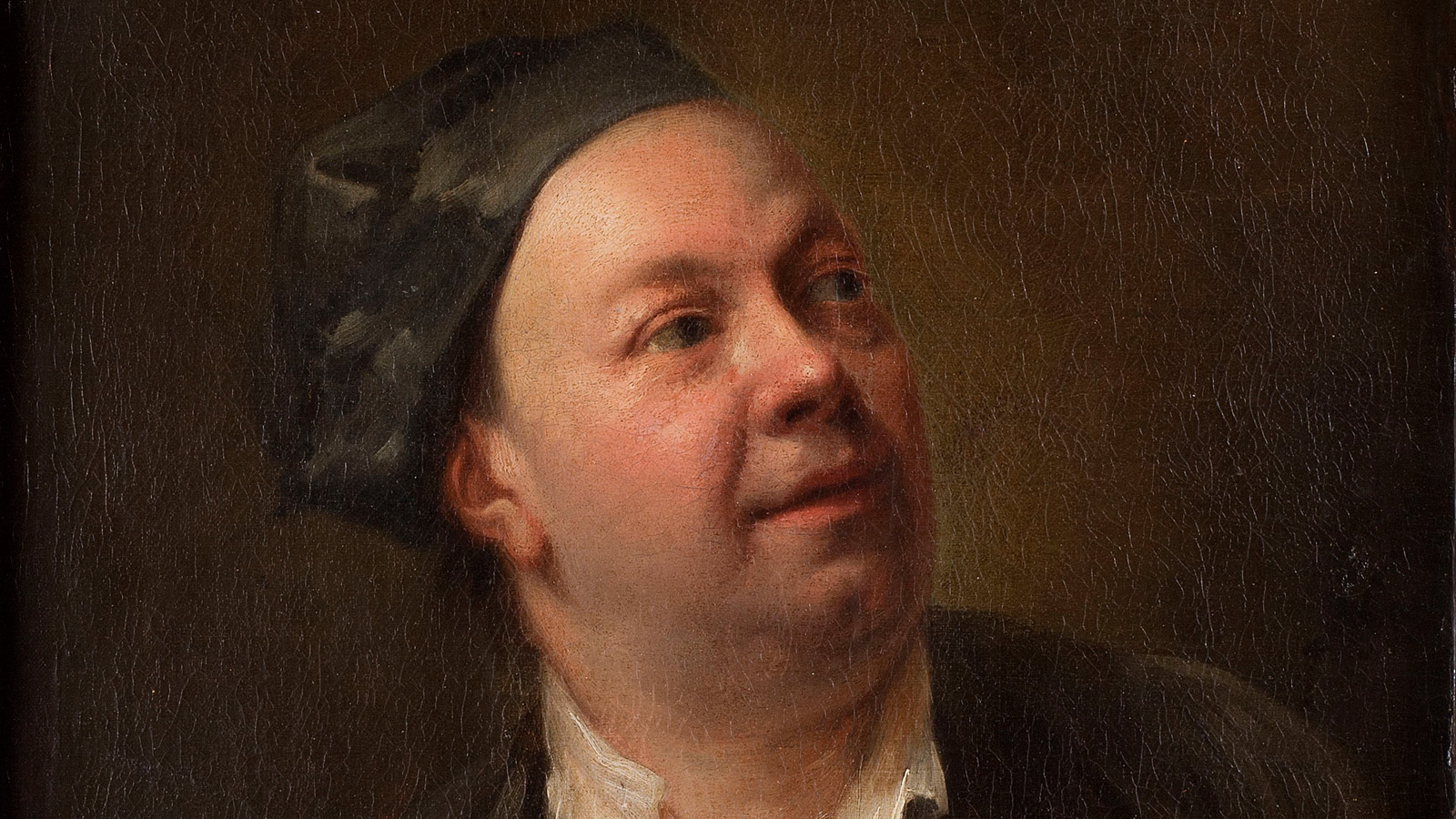
Pierre-Louis Dubus, known as Préville (1721–1799), member of the Comédie-Française from 1753 to 1786, played Figaro in Le Barbier de Séville by Pierre-Augustin de Beaumarchais in 1775. Comédie-Française.

This article contains information about the literary events and publications of 1775.

== Events ==
- January 17 – Richard Brinsley Sheridan's first play, the comedy of manners The Rivals, is premièred at the Covent Garden Theatre in London, then extensively rewritten. It reopens on January 28 to acclaim. The play introduces the character of Mrs. Malaprop.
- February 23 – Pierre Beaumarchais' comedy Le Barbier de Séville is premièred by the Comédie-Française at the Tuileries Palace in Paris. Rewritten it reopens on February 26 to better success. It introduces the character of Figaro.
- October 19 – Samuel Johnson, Henry Thrale and Hester Thrale, visiting Paris, watch King Louis XVI and Queen Marie Antoinette dining.
- December 29 – The English actress Sarah Siddons makes her debut at the Drury Lane Theatre in London as Portia in The Merchant of Venice but is poorly received.

== New books ==
=== Prose ===
- Hester Chapone – Miscellanies
- William Combe – Letters from Eliza to Yorick (forgeries supposed to be from Eliza Draper to Laurence Sterne)
- Charles Johnstone – The Pilgrim
- Samuel Jackson Pratt (as Courtney Melmoth) – Liberal Opinions, upon Animals, Man, and Providence
- Moral Tales (anonymous)
- Nicolas-Edme Rétif – Le Paysan perverti
- Richard Savage – The Works of Richard Savage (Samuel Johnson, editor)
- Tahsin (Mir Muhammad Husain 'Ata Khan) – Nau Tarz-e-Murassa (Urdu translation of Amir Khusrow's The Tale of the Four Dervishes)

=== Drama ===
- Vittorio Alfieri – Cleopatra
- Pierre Beaumarchais – Le Barbier de Séville
- Thomas Francklin – Matilda
- David Garrick – Bon Ton
- John Hoole – Cleonice, Princess of Bithynia
- Thomas Hull – Edward and Eleonora
- Robert Jephson – Braganza
- Charlotte Lennox – Old City Manners
- Gotthold Lessing – Die Juden
- Louis-Sébastien Mercier
  - La Brouette du vinaigrier
  - Natalie
- Richard Brinsley Sheridan – The Rivals
- Ignacio López de Ayala – Numancia destruida

=== Poetry ===
- Geoffrey Chaucer – The Canterbury Tales of Chaucer (Thomas Tyrwhitt, editor)
- George Crabbe – Inebriety
- Hugh Downman – The Drama
- Thomas Gray – Poems
- Edward Jerningham – The Fall of Mexico
- Mary Robinson – Poems

=== Non-fiction ===
- Edmund Burke
  - Speech on American Taxation, April 19, 1774
  - Speech on Conciliation with the Colonies, March 22, 1775
- Susannah Dobson – Life of Petrarch (drawn from Jacques-François de Sade's Mémoires pour la vie de François Petrarch)
- Elizabeth Griffith – The Morality of Shakespeare's Comedy Illustrated
- John Howie – Biographia Scoticana
- Samuel Johnson
  - A Journey to the Western Islands of Scotland
  - Taxation No Tyranny: An Answer to the Resolutions and Address of the American Congress
- Henrietta Knight – Letters to William Shenstone
- James Macpherson – The History of Great Britain
- Honoré Gabriel Riqueti, comte de Mirabeau – Essai sur le despotisme
- Joseph Priestley – Hartley's Theory of the Human Mind
- Louis Claude de Saint-Martin – Des erreurs et de la vérité
- Laurence Sterne (died 1768)
  - Letters of the Late Rev. Mr. L. Sterne
  - Sterne's Letters to his Friends on Various Occasions
- John Wesley – A Calm Address to Our American Colonies

== Births ==
- January 30 – Walter Savage Landor, English poet (died 1864)
- February 10 – Charles Lamb, English essayist (died 1834)
- February 28 – Sophie Tieck, German poet (died 1833)
- May 13 – Henry Crabb Robinson, English man of letters and diarist (died 1867)
- June 15 – Elizabeth Benger, English biographer, novelist and poet (died 1827)
- July 9 – Matthew Lewis, English novelist and dramatist (died 1818)
- August 2 – William Henry Ireland, English forger of Shakespeariana (died 1835)
- September 13 – Mary Rolls, English poet (died 1835)
- December 16 – Jane Austen, English novelist (died 1817)

== Deaths ==
- January 8 – John Baskerville, English printer and typefounder (born 1707)
- January 13 – Johann Georg Walch, German theologian (born 1693)
- March 5 – Pierre-Laurent Buirette de Belloy, French dramatist and actor (born 1727)
- March 21 – Samuel Boyce, English engraver, dramatist and poet (unknown year of birth)
- June 23 – Karl Ludwig von Pöllnitz, German adventurer and writer (born 1692)
- November 21 – John Hill, English botanist novelist and dramatist (born c. 1716)
