= 1776 in literature =

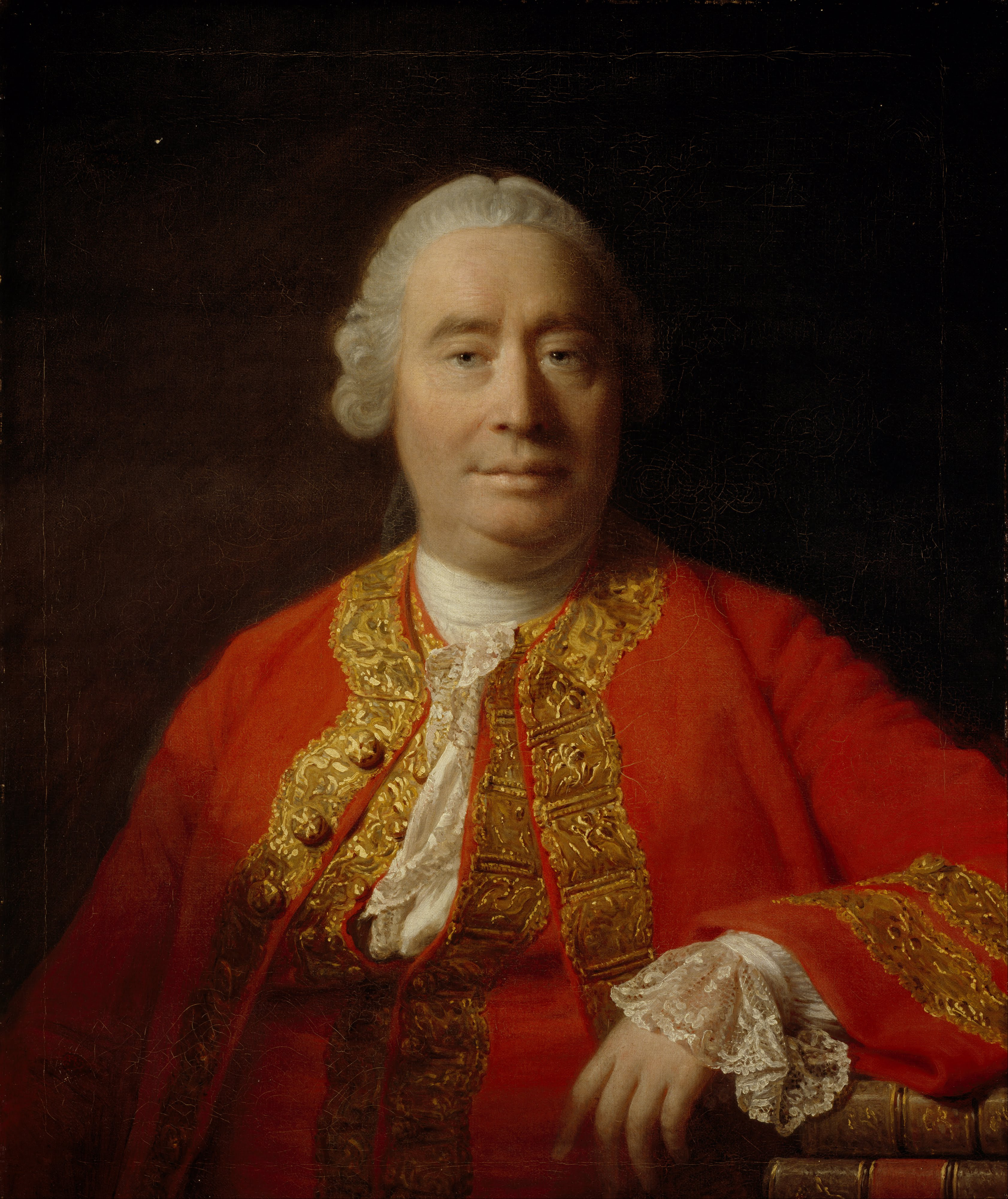
David Hume, 1711 - 1776. Scottish historian and philosopher

This article contains information about the literary events and publications of 1776.

== Events ==
- January 8 – The English actor John Philip Kemble makes his stage début, as Theodosius in Nathaniel Lee's eponymous tragedy, at Wolverhampton, England, with the Crump and Chamberlain company.
- August 7 – David Hume, weeks before his death, adds a codicil to his will, giving instructions for the publication of the Dialogues Concerning Natural Religion, on which he has been working since 1750.
- unknown dates – The Wenyuan Chamber is built in China as an imperial library in the Forbidden City of Beijing.

== New books ==
=== Fiction ===
- Elizabeth Griffith – The Story of Lady Juliana Harley
- Friedrich Heinrich Jacobi – Edward Allwill's Briefsammlung
- Ignacy Krasicki – The Adventures of Mr. Nicholas Wisdom (Mikołaja Doświadczyńskiego przypadki) (first novel in Polish)
- Samuel Jackson Pratt (as Courtney Melmoth) – The Pupil of Pleasure, or, The New System (Lord Chesterfield's) Illustrated

=== Drama ===
- George Edward Ayscough (adapted from Voltaire) – Semiramis
- Hannah Cowley – The Runaway
- Samuel Foote – The Bankrupt
- Johann Wolfgang von Goethe – Stella (first version)
- Friedrich Maximilian Klinger – Sturm und Drang
- Johann Anton Leisewitz – Julius of Taranto (first performed)
- Jakob Michael Reinhold Lenz – The Soldiers (Die Soldaten)
- Arthur Murphy – Three Weeks After Marriage
- Heinrich Leopold Wagner – Die Kindermörderin
- Lope de Vega (ed. Antonio de Sancha) – Obras sueltas

=== Poetry ===
- James Beattie – Poems
- Richard Graves – Euphrosyne
- Hannah More – Sir Eldred of the Bower, and The Bleeding Rock
- Jonathan Richardson – Morning Thoughts
- John Scott – Amwell
- Augustus Montague Toplady – Psalms and Hymns
- William Whitehead – Variety
- Gaspar Melchor de Jovellanos – Jovino a sus amigos de Salamanca

=== Non-fiction ===
- John Adams – Thoughts on Government
- James Beattie – Essays
- Jeremy Bentham – Fragment on Government
- Charles Burney – A General History of Music (completed 1789)
- George Campbell – The Philosophy of Rhetoric
- David Dalrymple – Annals of Scotland
- Edward Gibbon – The History of the Decline and Fall of the Roman Empire, volume 1
- Oliver Goldsmith – A Survey of Experimental Philosophy
- Sir John Hawkins – A General History of the Science and Practice of Music
- David Herd – Ancient and Modern Scottish Songs
- Soame Jenyns – A View of the Internal Evidence of the Christian Religion
- Thomas Paine
  - Common Sense
  - The American Crisis
- Richard Price – Observations on the Nature of Civil Liberty
- Adam Smith – An Inquiry into the Nature and Causes of the Wealth of Nations

== Births ==
- January – Frances Burney, English dramatist (died 1828)
- January 17 – Jane Porter, Scottish novelist and dramatist (died 1850)
- January 24 – E. T. A. Hoffmann, German fantasy and horror writer (died 1822)
- January 25 – Joseph Görres, German writer, philosopher and theologian (died 1848)
- February 12 – Richard Mant, English writer and cleric (died 1848)
- March 9 – Archibald Bell, Scottish lawyer and miscellanist (died 1854)
- April 13 – Wilhelm von Schütz, German author and playwright (died 1847)
- July 1 – Sophie Gay, French author (died 1852)
- September 21 – John Fitchett, English epic poet (died 1838)
- September 27 – Maria Versfelt, Dutch actress and memoirist (died 1845)
- November 16 – Mary Matilda Betham, English diarist, scholar and poet (died 1852)
- November 20 – William Blackwood, Scottish publisher (died 1834)

== Deaths ==
- April 29 – Edward Wortley Montagu, English travel writer (born 1713)
- May 23 – Jeanne Julie Éléonore de Lespinasse (Mademoiselle de Lespinasse), French salonnière (born 1732)
- May 30 – Albert Frick, German theologian (born 1732)
- June 2 – Robert Foulis, Scottish art critic and publisher (born 1707)
- August 25 – David Hume, Scottish philosopher, historian and economist (born 1711)
- October 17 – Pierre François le Courayer, French theologian (born 1681)
