= 1774 in literature =

This article contains information about the literary events and publications of 1774.

== Events ==
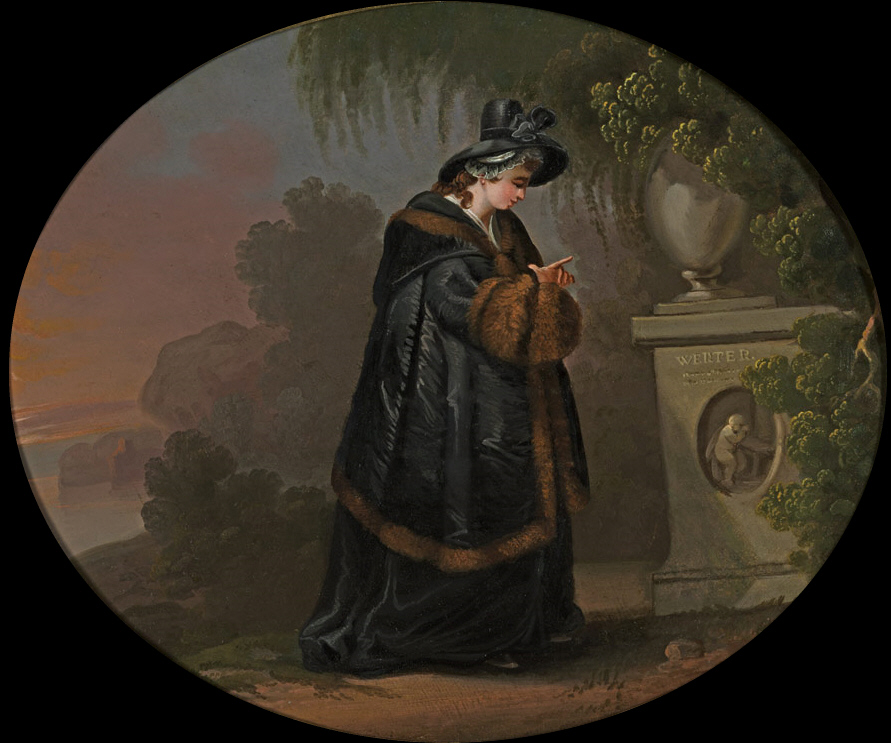
Charlotte visiting Werther's grave. A scene based on The Sorrows of Young Werther, though not actually depicted in the novel.

- February 22 – The English legal case of Donaldson v Beckett is decided in the House of Lords, denying the continued existence of a perpetual common law copyright and holding that copyright is a creation of statute and can be limited in its duration. This does permit authors to claim copyright on their own works.
- September 14 – A new Stadsschouwburg (municipal theatre) in Amsterdam opens with the première of Lucretia Wilhelmina van Merken's tragedy Jacob Simonszoon de Ryk.
- September 29 – Johann Wolfgang von Goethe's semi-autobiographical epistolary novel The Sorrows of Young Werther (Die Leiden des jungen Werthers) (written January – March) is published anonymously in Leipzig, Germany; it is influential in the Sturm und Drang movement and Romanticism. Werther was one of Goethe's few works akin in style and mood to the German proto-Romantic movement known as Sturm und Drang, a movement which he renounced after he and Friedrich von Schiller joined the rival movement of Weimar Classicism. The novel was published anonymously, and Goethe distanced himself from it in his later years, regretting the fame it had brought him and the consequent attention to his own youthful love of Charlotte Buff, then already engaged to the lawyer and archivist Johann Christian Kestner. Although Goethe wrote Werther at the age of 24, it remained the only work of his with which many of his visitors were familiar, even in his old age. Goethe had changed his views of literature radically by then, even denouncing the Romantic movement as "everything that is sick."
- unknown dates
  - After the destruction of the Schloss Weimar by fire, Karl August, Grand Duke of Saxe-Weimar-Eisenach, forms a commission for its reconstruction directed by Johann Wolfgang von Goethe.
  - James Lackington begins in the London bookselling business.
  - Johann Gottlob Theaenus Schneider becomes secretary to Richard François Philippe Brunck.
  - The National and University Library of Slovenia in Ljubljana is established as the Lyceum Library, from the remains of the dissolved Jesuit library and several monastery libraries.
  - Alberto Fortis publishes Viaggio in Dalmazia ("Journey to Dalmatia") and starts Morlachism.

== New books ==
=== Fiction ===
- Jeremy Bentham – The White Bull
- Henry Brooke – Juliet Grenville
- Johann Wolfgang von Goethe – The Sorrows of Young Werther
- Charles Johnstone – The History of Arsaces
- The Newgate Calendar
- Christoph Martin Wieland – Die Abderiten, eine sehr wahrscheinliche Geschichte (The Abderites: A Very Probable Story)

=== Children ===
- Johann Bernhard Basedow – Elementarwerk (first of four volumes)

=== Drama ===
- Miles Peter Andrews – The Election
- John Burgoyne – The Maid of the Oaks
- George Colman the Elder – The Man of Business
- Richard Cumberland
  - The Choleric Man
  - The Note of Hand
- Charles Dibdin – The Waterman
- Alexander Dow – Sethona
- Johann Wolfgang von Goethe – Clavigo
- Hugh Kelly – The Romance of an Hour
- Jakob Michael Reinhold Lenz – The Tutor (Der Hofmeister)
- Gaspar Melchor de Jovellanos – El delincuente honrado

=== Poetry ===
- James Beattie – The Minstrel, volume 2
- William Dunkin – Poetical Works
- Oliver Goldsmith – Retaliation
- Richard Graves – The Progress of Gallantry
- William Mason – An Heroic Postscript to the Public
- Hannah More – The Inflexible Captive
- Samuel Jackson Pratt (as Courtney Melmoth) – The Tears of A Genius, occasioned by the Death of Dr. Goldsmith
- Henry James Pye – Farringdon Hill
- Mary Scott – The Female Advocate
- Candido Maria Trigueros – El poeta filósofo o Poesías filosóficas en verso pentámetro
- William Whitehead – Plays and Poems, by William Whitehead, Esq. Poet Laureat

=== Non-fiction ===
- Giacomo Casanova – Istoria delle turbolenze della Polonia
- Mary Deverell – Sermons
- Alberto Fortis – Viaggio in Dalmazia
- Martin Gerbert – De cantu et musica sacra
- Oliver Goldsmith
  - The Grecian History
  - An History of the Earth and Animated Nature
- Henry Home – Sketches of the History of Man
- John Hutchins (died 1773) – The History and Antiquities of Dorset
- Thomas Jefferson – A Summary View of the Rights of British America
- Samuel Johnson – The Patriot
- Antoine-Simon Le Page du Pratz – The History of Louisiana, or of the Western Parts of Virginia and Carolina (English translation of Histoire de la Louisiane (1758) in 1 vol.)
- Joseph Priestley – Experiments and Observations on Different Kinds of Air
- William Richardson – A Philosophical Analysis and Illustration of Some of Shakespeare's Remarkable Characters
- Pedro Rodríguez, Count of Campomanes – Discurso sobre el fomento de la industria popular
- Philip Stanhope, 4th Earl of Chesterfield – Letters to his Son
- Sugita Genpaku – Kaitai Shinsho (解体新書, "New Text on Anatomy", Japanese translation of Ontleedkundige Tafelen)
- Horace Walpole – A Description of Strawberry-Hill
- Thomas Warton – The History of English Poetry, volume 1
- John Wesley – Thoughts upon Slavery

== Births ==
- January 1 – Pietro Giordani, Italian translator, scholar and writer (died 1848)
- February 24 – Archibald Constable, Scottish publisher (died 1827)
- July 14 – Francis Lathom, Dutch-born English Gothic novelist and dramatist (died 1832)
- August 12 – Robert Southey, English poet and Poet Laureate (died 1843)

== Deaths ==
- April 4 – Oliver Goldsmith, Irish dramatist (born 1728/1730)
- April 28 – Gottfried Lengnich, German/Polish historian (born 1689)
- September 17 – Abraham Langford, English auctioneer and playwright (born 1711)
- October 16 – Robert Fergusson, Scottish poet (head injury, born 1750)
- unknown date – Catherine Michelle de Maisonneuve, French editor and writer
