= 1788 in literature =

This article contains information about the literary events and publications of 1788.

== Events ==
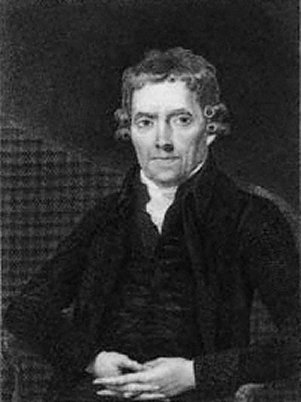
Joseph Johnson, co-founder of the Analytical Review (engraving by William Sharp after a painting by Moses Haughton)

- May – Joseph Johnson and Thomas Christie found the radical Analytical Review in London.
- May 10 – Sweden's Royal Dramatic Theatre (Kungliga Dramatiska Teatern) is founded.

== New books ==
=== Fiction ===
- Bernardin de St. Pierre – Paul et Virginie
- Charlotte Turner Smith – Emmeline; or The Orphan of the Castle
- Mary Wollstonecraft – Mary: A Fiction
- Yuan Mei – What the Master Would Not Discuss

=== Children ===
- Thomas Day – A History of Little Jack
- François Guillaume Ducray-Duminil – Alexis, ou la Maisonnette dans les bois (Alexis or the Little House in the Woods)
- Mary Wollstonecraft – Original Stories from Real Life, with Conversations Calculated to Regulate the Affections, and Form the Mind to Truth and Goodness

=== Drama ===
- Frances Brooke – Marian
- George Colman the Younger – Ways and Means
- Hannah Cowley – The Fate of Sparta
- Olympe de Gouges – Zamore et Mirza (published)
- Bertie Greatheed – The Regent
- Elizabeth Inchbald
  - Animal Magnetism
  - The Child of Nature
- John O'Keeffe
  - Aladdin
  - The Prisoner at Large
- Mariana Starke – The Sword of Peace
- Eglantine Wallace – The Ton

=== Poetry ===
- Maria and Harriet Falconar
  - Poems
  - Poems on Slavery
- Samuel Jackson Pratt – Sympathy

=== Non-fiction ===
- Anthony Benezet – Some Historical Account of Guinea
- Ralph Broome – Letters of Simkin the Second to his dear brother in Wales, containing a humble description of the trial of Warren Hastings, Esq. (further instalments up to 1791)
- Edward Gibbon – Volumes IV, V, and VI of The History of the Decline and Fall of the Roman Empire
- Alexander Hamilton, James Madison, and John Jay – The Federalist Papers
- George Hepplewhite (attr.) – Cabinet Maker and Upholsterers Guide
- Immanuel Kant – Critique of Practical Reason (Kritik der praktischen Vernunft)
- Hannah More – Thoughts on the Importance of the Manners of the Great to General Society
- Richard Porson – Letters to Archdeacon Travis
- Thomas Scott – Commentary on the Whole Bible (beginning 174 weekly numbers)

== Births ==
- January 22 – George Gordon Byron, 6th Baron Byron, English poet (died 1824)
- February 28 – Samuel Bamford, English writer, poet and radical (died 1872)
- March 1 – Gheorghe Asachi, Moldavian polymath (died 1869)
- March 20 – Thomas Medwin, English poet, biographer and translator (died 1869)
- September 22 – Theodore Edward Hook, English man of letters and composer (died 1841)
- c. October 14 – Robert Millhouse, English weaver poet (died 1839)
- October 24 – Sarah Josepha Hale, American novelist and poet (died 1879)
- December 6 – Richard Harris Barham (Thomas Ingoldsby), English novelist, poet and cleric (died 1845)

== Deaths ==
- March 31 – Frances Vane, Viscountess Vane (Lady Fanny), English memoirist (born 1715)
- May 17 – Dorothea Biehl, Danish dramatist and translator (born 1731)
- July 21 – Gaetano Filangieri, Italian philosopher (born 1752)
- August 4 – Evan Evans (Ieuan Fardd or Ieuan Brydydd Hir), priest and poet, 57
- August 16 – Francisco Javier Alegre, Mexican historian and translator (born 1729)
- September 16 – Andrea Spagni, Italian theologian (born 1716)
- October 13 – Robert Nugent, 1st Earl Nugent, Irish politician and poet (born 1709)
