= 1791 in poetry =

Nationality words link to articles with information on the nation's poetry or literature (for instance, Irish or France).

== Events ==
- William Bartram's Travels Through North and South Carolina, Georgia, East and West Florida, the Cherokee Country, the Extensive Territories of the Muscogulges, or Creek Confederacy, and the Country of the Chactaws contains enthusiastic descriptions of scenery that influence writers including Samuel Taylor Coleridge, who calls the book one of "high merit", and William Wordsworth.
- Scottish poet Robert Burns gives up farming for a full-time post as an exciseman in Dumfries, writes "Ae Fond Kiss", "The Banks O' Doon" and "Sweet Afton", and publishes his last major poem, the narrative "Tam o' Shanter" (written 1790 and first published on 18 March 1791 in the Edinburgh Herald; also published in F. Grose, The Antiquities of Scotland, volume 2, this year).
- Samuel Taylor Coleridge composes "On Quitting School", marking his transfer from Christ's Hospital school to Jesus College, Cambridge, although it will not be published until 1834, after his death.

== Works published in English ==
=== United Kingdom ===
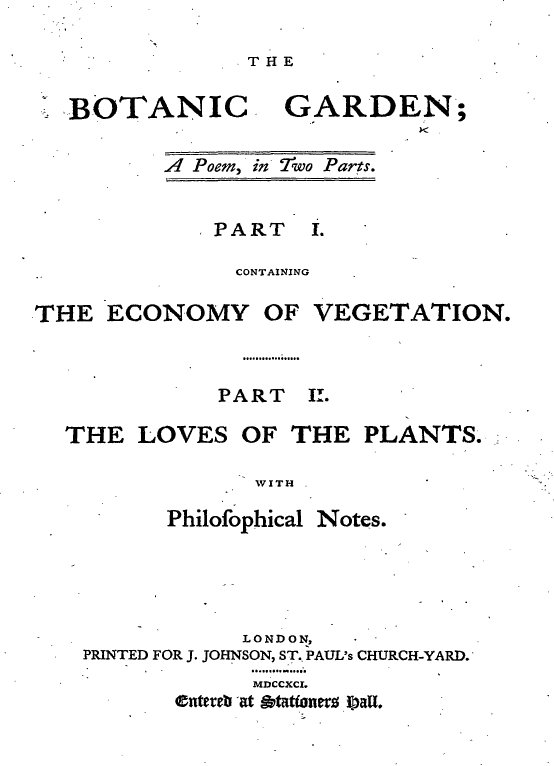
Title page from The Botanic Garden by Erasmus Darwin

- John Aikin, Poems
- William Blake, published anonymously, "The French Revolution"
- Robert Burns, "Tam o' Shanter", published
- William Cowper, The Iliad and the Odyssey
- Erasmus Darwin, The Botanic Garden, consisting of two poems about scientific matters and their implications: "The Loves of the Plants", which became popular when it was originally published separately in 1789, and "The Economy of Vegetation", which celebrates technological innovation, scientific discovery and offers scientific theories. The poems, thought to be associated with the politics of the French Revolution and sexual licentiousness, were controversial (see the parody Loves of the Triangles 1798)
- William Gifford, published anonymously, The Baviad
- Francis Grose, The Antiquities of Scotland, Volume 2 (Volume 1 published in 1789); including "Tam o' Shanter" by Robert Burns
- George Huddesford, editor and author, published anonymously, Salmagundi: A miscellaneous combination of original poetry, largely written by Huddesford
- Richard Polwhele, Poems
- Christopher Smart, The Poems of the late Christopher Smart, edited by Francis Newbey, assisted by Smart's nephew, Christopher Hunter

=== United States ===
- Richard Alsop, Theodore Dwight, Elihu Hubbard Smith, Lemuel Hopkins and Mason Cogswell, The Echo, Federalist verse satire ridiculing Thomas Jefferson and other anti-Federalists; published first in the American Mercury
- Benjamin Youngs Prime, Columbia's Glory, depicting the Revolutionary War, the only work by the author to be published under his own name
- Jenny Fenno, Occasional Compositions in Prose and Verse, United States
- Thomas Morris, Miscellanies in Prose and Verse
- Benjamin Youngs Prime, Columbia's Glory, or British Pride Humbled

== Works published in other languages ==
- Basilio da Gama, Quitúbia; Brazil

== Births ==
Death years link to the corresponding "[year] in poetry" article:

- January 15 – Franz Grillparzer (died 1872), Austrian dramatic poet
- February 10 – Ōtagaki Rengetsu (died 1875), Japanese Buddhist nun, poet, potter, painter and calligrapher
- June 9 – John Howard Payne (died 1852), American actor, playwright, author and American consul in Tunis (1842–1852); most remembered as creator of "Home! Sweet Home!"
- September 1 – Lydia Sigourney, the "Sweet Singer of Hartford" (died 1865), American poet
- September 7 – Giuseppe Gioachino Belli (died 1863), Italian poet famous for his sonnets in Romanesco, the dialect of Rome
- October 3 – Sima Milutinović Sarajlija (died 1847), Bosnian–Serbian poet, hajduk, translator, historian, philologist, diplomat and adventurer
- December 14:
  - Johan Ludvig Heiberg (died 1860), Danish poet, playwright and literary critic and historian
  - Charles Wolfe (died 1823), Irish poet and Anglican clergyman
- date not known – Paramananda (died 1870 or 1874), Indian, Kashmiri-language poet

== Deaths ==
Birth years link to the corresponding "[year] in poetry" article:

- January 11 – William Williams Pantycelyn (born 1717), Welsh poet, prose and hymn writer
- March 15 – William Woty (born 1731?), English writer of light verse and law clerk
- June 12 – Francis Grose (born 1731), English antiquary, draughtsman and lexicographer
- June 27 – Johann Heinrich Merck (born 1741), German critic, essayist, editor, writer and poet; from suicide
- June 28 (June 17 O.S.) – John Wesley (born 1703), English cleric and Christian theologian, founder of Methodism, psalmist and hymnist
- July 7 – Thomas Blacklock (born 1721), blind Scottish poet
- September 17 – Tomás de Iriarte y Oropesa (born 1750), Spanish neoclassical poet
- September 18 – Elias Caspar Reichard (born 1714), German teacher and writer
- October 10 – Christian Friedrich Daniel Schubart (born 1739), German poet, organist, composer and journalist
- December 31 – John Ellis (born 1698), English scrivener and poet
- date not known – John Frederick Bryant (born 1753), English pipe-maker and poet

== See also ==
- Poetry
