= 1783 in poetry =

This article covers 1783 in poetry. Nationality words link to articles with information on the nation's poetry or literature (for instance, Irish or France).

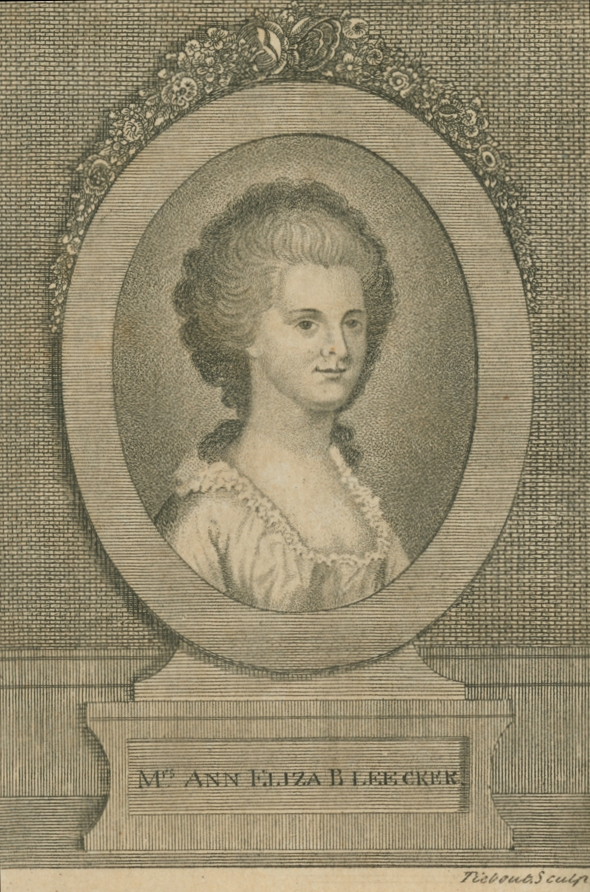
American poet Ann Eliza Bleecker died this year (engraving from frontispiece of Posthumous Works, 1793)

== Works published ==
=== United Kingdom ===
- Lady Anne Barnard, Auld Robin Gray (ballad) (published anonymously)
- William Blake, Poetical Sketches
- Robert Burns, "Now Westlin' Winds" or "Composed in August" (written)
- Jane Cave (later, Jane Wiscom), Poems on Various Subjects, Entertaining, Elegiac, and Religious
- Judith Cowper (later, Judith Madan), The Progress of Poetry
- George Crabbe, The Village
- John Hoole translator, Orlando Furioso
- Joseph Ritson, editor, A Select Collection of English Songs, anthology
- John Wolcot, writing under the pen name "Peter Pindar", More Lyric Odes, to the Royal Academicians (Lyric Odes 1782)

=== Other ===
- David Humphreys, United States:
  - The Glory of America; or Peace Triumphant over War
  - Poem on the Industry of the United States of America

== Births ==
Death years link to the corresponding "[year] in poetry" article:

- April 3 – Washington Irving (died 1859), American author, essayist, biographer, historian and poet
- April 21 – Reginald Heber (died 1826), English Anglican bishop, poet and hymn writer
- September 8 – N. F. S. Grundtvig (died 1872), Danish pastor, author, poet, philosopher, historian, teacher and nationalist politician
- September 23 – Jane Taylor (died 1824), English poet and novelist
- December 10 – María Bibiana Benítez (died c.1873), Puerto Rican poet and playwright

== Deaths ==
Birth years link to the corresponding "[year] in poetry" article:

- January 2 – Johann Jakob Bodmer (born 1698), German-language Swiss, author, critic, academic and poet
- January 10 – Phanuel Bacon (born 1700) English clergyman, playwright, poet and author
- July 7 – Magnus Gottfried Lichtwer born 1719), German
- July 15 – Yokoi Yayū 横井 也有, born Yokoi Tokitsura (横井 時般), and took the pseudonym Tatsunojō (born 1702), Japanese samurai, scholar of Kokugaku and haikai poet
- October 10 – Henry Brooke (born 1703) Irish poet and playwright
- November 23 – Ann Eliza Bleecker (born 1752), American poet and correspondent
- December 12 – John Scott, 53 (born 1731), English poet and friend of Samuel Johnson
- Approximate date – John Seccomb (born 1708), American clergyman and poet

== See also ==
- List of years in poetry
- List of years in literature
- 18th century in poetry
- 18th century in literature
- French literature of the 18th century
- Sturm und Drang (the conventional translation is "Storm and Stress"; a more literal translation, however, might be "storm and urge", "storm and longing", "storm and drive" or "storm and impulse"), a movement in German literature (including poetry) and music from the late 1760s through the early 1780s
- List of years in poetry
- Poetry
