= 18th century in poetry =

== Decades and years ==
1690s	1690	1691	1692	1693	1694	1695	1696	1697	1698	1699
1700s	1700	1701	1702	1703	1704	1705	1706	1707	1708	1709
1710s	1710	1711	1712	1713	1714	1715	1716	1717	1718	1719
1720s	1720	1721	1722	1723	1724	1725	1726	1727	1728	1729
1730s	1730	1731	1732	1733	1734	1735	1736	1737	1738	1739
1740s	1740	1741	1742	1743	1744	1745	1746	1747	1748	1749
1750s	1750	1751	1752	1753	1754	1755	1756	1757	1758	1759
1760s	1760	1761	1762	1763	1764	1765	1766	1767	1768	1769
1770s	1770	1771	1772	1773	1774	1775	1776	1777	1778	1779
1780s	1780	1781	1782	1783	1784	1785	1786	1787	1788	1789
1790s	1790	1791	1792	1793	1794	1795	1796	1797	1798	1799
1800s	1800	1801	1802	1803	1804	1805	1806	1807	1808	1809

== See also ==
- Augustan poetry
