= 1757 in poetry =

List of years in poetry	(table)
- … 1747; 1748; 1749; 1750; 1751; 1752; 1753; 1754; 1755; 1756; 1757; 1758; 1759; 1760; 1761; 1762; 1763; 1764; 1765; 1766; 1767 …
- In literature 1754 1755 1756 1757 1758 1759 1760
- Art; Archaeology; Architecture; Literature; Music; Philosophy; Science; +...

Nationality words link to articles with information on the nation's poetry or literature (for instance, Irish or France).

== Events ==
- May 6 – Asylum confinement of Christopher Smart: English poet Christopher Smart is confined to St Luke's Hospital for Lunatics in London. (He may have been confined in a private madhouse before this.) This follows incidents in which he prayed loudly in public places, soliciting others to join him. Samuel Johnson visits him and considers he should be at large, saying, "I'd as lief pray with Kit Smart as anyone else." Smart is released from asylum in January 1763. While confined at St Luke's, he conceives of and writes A Song to David, published in 1763, and Jubilate Agno, not published until 1939
- December 11 – Death of Colley Cibber. His office as Poet Laureate of Great Britain is declined by Thomas Gray and passes to William Whitehead.
- Thomas Warton appointed Professor of Poetry at the University of Oxford

== Works published ==
=== English language ===
- Mark Akenside, The Pleasures of the Imagination, revised version of a long didactic poem originally published in 1744
- Robert Andrews, Eidyllia; or, Miscellaneous Poems, including a preface with a vehement attack on the use of rhyme
- Cornelius Arnold, Poems on Several Occasions
- Samuel Boyce, Poems on Several Occasions
- Martha Wadsworth Brewster, Poems on Divers Subjects, includes acrostics, eulogies, epithalamiums, verse letters, scriptural paraphrases, a love poem, a quaternion, verse prayer, occasional pieces, acrostics, and prose works; one of four volumes of poetry published by English Colonial American women; Brewster had to demonstrate her authorship of the book by publicly paraphrasing a psalm into verse
- Edmund Burke, A Philosophical Enquiry into the Origin of Our Ideas of the Sublime and Beautiful, criticism
- Benjamin Church, The Choice, modeled on the English poet John Pomfret's poem of the same title; describes aristocratic aspirations of the day and favors a moral and religious way of life English Colonial America
- Robert Colvill, Britain, published anonymously
- John Gilbert Cooper, writing under the pen name "Aristippus", Epistles to the Great (see also The Call of Aristippus 1758)
- John Duncombe, The Feminead; or, Female Genius (see also The Feminead 1754 and Mary Scott's The Female Advocate 1774)
- John Dyer, The Fleece
- Thomas Gray, Odes by Mr. Gray, including "The Progress of Poesy" and "The Bard"; the first book published by Horace Walpole's Strawberry Hill Press
- William Thompson, Poems on Several Occasions
- William Wilkie, The Epigoniad, published anonymously
- Edward Young, The Works of the Author of the Night Thoughts

=== Other languages ===
- Johann Jakob Bodmer, editor, publishes portions of the Nibelunglied: "The Revenge of Kriemheld" and "The Lament Over the Heroes of Etzel", German-language works published in Switzerland

== Births ==
Birth years link to the corresponding "[year] in poetry" article:

- February 27 – Andrew Macdonald (died 1790), Scottish clergyman, poet and playwright
- November 9 – William Sotheby (died 1833), English poet and translator
- November 27? – Mary Robinson, née Darby (died 1800), English actress, poet, dramatist, novelist and royal mistress
- November 28 – William Blake (died 1827), English artist and poet
- Dayaram (died 1852), Indian, Gujarati-language poet

== Deaths ==
Death years link to the corresponding "[year] in poetry" article:

- February 7 – Giuseppe Maria Buondelmonti (born 1713), Italian poet, orator and philosopher
- December 11 – Colley Cibber (born 1671), English actor-manager, playwright and Poet Laureate
- December 15 (bur.) – John Dyer (born 1699), Anglo-Welsh painter, poet and clergyman
- Bulleh Shah (born 1680), Punjabi Sufi poet, humanist and philosopher

== See also ==
- Poetry
- List of years in poetry
