= 1758 in poetry =

| List of years in poetry | (table) |
- … 1748; 1749; 1750; 1751; 1752; 1753; 1754; 1755; 1756; 1757; 1758; 1759; 1760; 1761; 1762; 1763; 1764; 1765; 1766; 1767; 1768 …
- In literature 1755 1756 1757 1758 1759 1760 1761
- Art; Archaeology; Architecture; Literature; Music; Philosophy; Science; +...

Nationality words link to articles with information on the nation's poetry or literature (for instance, Irish or France).

== Events ==
- Christopher Smart writes "Jubilate Agno" (about 1758-63), only published in 1939

== Works published ==
=== United Kingdom ===
- Mark Akenside, An Ode to the Country Gentlemen of England
- John Gilbert Cooper, The Call of Aristippus
- Robert Dodsley:
  - Cleone: A tragedy, verse drama performed in December; the work also contains the author's poem "Melpomene", on the sublime
  - Collection of Poems, volumes five and six
- James Macpherson, The Highlander
- Thomas Parnell, Posthumous Works

=== English, Colonial America ===
- Thomas Prince, The Psalms, Hymns, & spiritual Songs of the Old and new Testaments, English, Colonial America
- Annis Boudinot Stockton, "To the Honorable Colonel Peter Schuyler" published in New-York Mercury and New American Magazine; her first published poem; Colonial America

=== Other ===
- Anica Bošković, Dijalog Serbian published in Venice
- Solomon Gessner, Der Tod Abels, Switzerland, German-language work akin to an idyllic pastoral
- Heyat Mahmud, Āmbiyābāṇī; Bengal, Bengali-language

== Oliver Goldsmith's "poetical scale" ==
In the January 1758 edition of the Literary Magazine, an anonymous writer widely believed to be English poet and author Oliver Goldsmith presented a table comparing 29 English poets, rating them on a scale in each of four aspects of literary greatness. A score of 20 was literary perfection. Some of his estimations:

| | Genius | Judgement | Learning | Versification |
| Geoffrey Chaucer | 16 | 12 | 10 | 14 |
| Edmund Spenser | 18 | 12 | 14 | 18 |
| William Shakespeare | 19 | 14 | 14 | 19 |
| Ben Jonson | 16 | 18 | 17 | 8 |
| Abraham Cowley | 17 | 17 | 15 | 17 |
| Edmund Waller | 12 | 12 | 10 | 16 |
| John Milton | 18 | 16 | 17 | 18 |
| John Dryden | 18 | 16 | 17 | 18 |
| Joseph Addison | 16 | 18 | 17 | 17 |
| Matthew Prior | 16 | 16 | 15 | 17 |
| Alexander Pope | 18 | 18 | 15 | 19 |

Some other poets Goldsmith placed on the scale: Michael Drayton, Lee, Aaron Hill, Nicholas Rowe, Garth, Southern and Hughes. John Donne was not listed, because, wrote Goldsmith, "Dr Donne was a man of wit, but he seems to have been at pains not to pass for a poet." (See also Mark Akenside's "Balance of Poets" of 1746.)

== Births ==
Death years link to the corresponding "[year] in poetry" article:

- February 3
  - Vasily Kapnist (died 1823), Ukrainian poet and playwright
  - Valentin Vodnik (died 1819), Carniolan Slovene poet, writer and priest
- March 15 – Magdalene Sophie Buchholm (died 1825), Norwegian poet
- April 6 – Sir George Dallas, 1st Baronet (died 1833), English politician and poet
- April 30 – Jane West, born Iliffe, publishing under the pen names "Prudentia Homespun" and "Mrs. West" (died 1852), English novelist, poet, playwright and writer of conduct literature and educational tracts
- December – Mary Leadbeater (died 1826), Irish poet and writer
- Also:
  - Ryōkan 良寛, born Eizō Yamamoto (died 1831), Japanese waka poet, calligrapher, Buddhist monk and often a hermit
  - year uncertain – Joseph Fawcett (died 1804), English Presbyterian minister and poet

== Deaths ==
Birth years link to the corresponding "[year] in poetry" article:

- January 1 – Johann Friedrich von Cronegk (born 1731), German dramatist, poet and essayist
- January 7 – Allan Ramsay (born 1686), Scottish poet
- July 15 – Ambrosius Stub (born 1705), Danish poet

== See also ==
- Poetry
- List of years in poetry
