= 1760 in poetry =

List of years in poetry	(table)
- … 1750; 1751; 1752; 1753; 1754; 1755; 1756; 1757; 1758; 1759; 1760; 1761; 1762; 1763; 1764; 1765; 1766; 1767; 1768; 1769; 1770 …
- In literature 1757 1758 1759 1760 1761 1762 1763
- Art; Archaeology; Architecture; Literature; Music; Philosophy; Science; +...

Nationality words link to articles with information on the nation's poetry or literature (for instance, Irish or France).

== Events ==
- June–October – James Macpherson makes his first tour of the Scottish Highlands and Islands to seek out traditional Gaelic poetry.
- October 25 – With the death of King George II of Great Britain, the era of Augustan poetry and Augustan literature, which started in 1702, is considered to have ended.

== Works published ==
- James Beattie, Original Poems and Translations
- John Cleland, The Times!, Volume 1, a verse satire
- George Cockings, War, an Heroic Poem, from the Taking of Minorca by the French to the Reduction of the Havannah, a 28-page poem supporting British generals; the poem would be republished three more times by 1765; English Colonial America
- George Colman, the elder, and Robert Lloyd, Two Odes, Part 1: "To Obscurity", Part 2: "To Oblivion", parodying Thomas Gray
- John Delap, Elegies
- Jupiter Hammon, An Evening Thought, the first poem published by an African American in English Colonial America; printed as a broadside; the poem's meter was common in Great Awakening sermons and African American a cappella hymns
- Robert Lloyd:
  - The Actor, published anonymously, a popular poem of its time
  - The Tears and Triumphs of Parnassus
- James Macpherson, Fragments of Ancient Poetry Collected in the Highlands of Scotland
- James Scott, Heaven: A vision, Seatonian Prize winner
- John Scott, Four Elegies: Descriptive and Moral, published anonymously
- Anne Steele, published under the name "Theodosia", Poems on Subjects Chiefly Devotional, two volumes; she donated her earnings from the book to charity, Colonial America
- The Famous Tommy Thumb's Little Story-book, with "Little Boy Blue"

== Births ==
Death years link to the corresponding "[year] in poetry" article:

- January 6 – Richard Polwhele, English clergyman, poet and topographer (died 1838)
- March 2 – Christina Charlotta Cederström, Swedish hostess of a salon, poet and painter
- March 10 – Leandro Fernández de Moratín, Spanish dramatist, translator and neoclassical poet (died 1828)
- May 10
  - Johann Peter Hebel, German poet (died 1826)
  - Claude Joseph Rouget de Lisle, French poet, composer (died 1836)
- October 26 – Maria Petronella Woesthoven, Dutch poet (died 1830)

== Deaths ==
Birth years link to the corresponding "[year] in poetry" article:

- February 14 – Isaac Hawkins Browne (born 1705), English poet
- May 9 – Nikolaus Ludwig von Zinzendorf (born 1700), German
- Date unknown – Bharatchandra Ray (born 1712), Bengali and Sanskrit poet and song composer

== See also ==
- Poetry
- List of years in poetry
