= 1764 in poetry =

List of years in poetry	(table)
- … 1754; 1755; 1756; 1757; 1758; 1759; 1760; 1761; 1762; 1763; 1764; 1765; 1766; 1767; 1768; 1769; 1770; 1771; 1772; 1773; 1774 …
- In literature 1761 1762 1763 1764 1765 1766 1767
- Art; Archaeology; Architecture; Literature; Music; Philosophy; Science; +...

Nationality words link to articles with information on the nation's poetry or literature (for instance, Irish or France).

== Events ==
- February – The Club, a London dining club, is founded by Samuel Johnson and Joshua Reynolds.

== Works published ==
- Charles Churchill (see "Deaths", below):
  - The Candidate
  - The Duelist
  - The Farewell
  - Gotham, Books 1, 2 and 3 published separately this year
  - Independence, published anonymously
  - The Times
- John Gilbert Cooper, Poems on Several Subjects
- James Grainger, The Sugar Cane, by a British doctor in Saint Kitts
- Edward Jerningham, The Nun
- Mary Latter, Liberty and Interest
- William Mason, Poems
- Benjamin Youngs Prime, The Patriotic Muse, English, Colonial America
- Christopher Smart, translator, A Poetical Translation of the Fables of Phaedrus
- Thomas Warton, editor, The Oxford Sausage; or, Select Poetical Pieces, anthology of verse and Oxford wit
- James Woodhouse, Poems on Sundry Occasions

== Births ==
Death years link to the corresponding "[year] in poetry" article:

- February 11 – Marie-Joseph de Chenier (died 1811), French
- February 15 – Jens Baggesen (died 1826), Danish
- July 27 – John Thelwall (died 1834), radical English orator, writer, elocutionist and poet
- August 18 – Judah Leib Ben-Ze'ev (died 1811), Galician Hebrew philologist, lexicographer, Biblical scholar and poet
- November 24 – Ulrika Widström (died 1841), Swedish poet and translator.

== Deaths ==
Birth years link to the corresponding "[year] in poetry" article:

- May 10 – Christian Friedrich Henrici, known as "Picander" (born 1700), German
- September 23 – Robert Dodsley (born 1703), English bookseller, poet, dramatist and anthologist
- November 4 – Charles Churchill (born 1732), English poet and satirist (see "Works", above)
- December 15 – Robert Lloyd (born 1733), English poet and satirist, died in Fleet Prison

== See also ==
- Poetry
- List of years in poetry
