= 1756 in poetry =

List of years in poetry	(table)
- … 1746; 1747; 1748; 1749; 1750; 1751; 1752; 1753; 1754; 1755; 1756; 1757; 1758; 1759; 1760; 1761; 1762; 1763; 1764; 1765; 1766 …
- In literature 1753 1754 1755 1756 1757 1758 1759
- Art; Archaeology; Architecture; Literature; Music; Philosophy; Science; +...

Nationality words link to articles with information on the nation's poetry or literature (for instance, Irish or France).

== Works published ==
=== United Kingdom ===
- Isaac Bickerstaffe, Leucothoe, published anonymously
- Francies Brooke, Virginia: A tragedy, a drama that contains poems
- Richard Owen Cambridge, An Elegy Written in an Empty Assembly Room, a parody of Alexander Pope's Eloisa to Abelard
- Thomas Cole, The Arbour; or, The Rural Philosopher, published anonymously
- William Kenrick, Epistles to Lorenzo, published anonymously
- William Mason, Odes
- Edward Moore, Poems, Fables and Plays
- Christopher Pitt, Poems [...] Together with The Jordan, "By the celebrated translator of Virgil's Aeneid", according to the book
- Christopher Smart:
  - Hymn to the Supreme Being
  - Translator, The Works of Horace (see also Works of Horace, Translated into Verse 1767)
- Joseph Warton, An Essay on the Writings and Genius of Pope, Volume 1 (Volume 2 published in 1782), criticism

=== English, Colonial America ===
- Jacob Duche, "Pennsylvania: A Poem", English, Colonial America
- Samuel Tilden, Tilden's Miscellaneous Poems, on Divers Occasions, Chiefly to Animate and Rouse the Soldiers, English, Colonial America, posthumously published

=== Other ===
- Solomon Gessner, Switzerland, German-language:
  - Idyllen, versions of the work eventually appeared in English, Dutch, Portuguese, Spanish, Swedish and Czech (see also a second volume of Idyllen 1772)
  - Inkel und Yanko, a reworked story borrowed from The Spectator (No. 11, March 13, 1711)
- Voltaire, Poème sur le désastre de Lisbonne ("Poem on the Lisbon Disaster"), on the 1755 Lisbon earthquake; 180 lines, composed in December, 1755; France

== Births ==
Death years link to the corresponding "[year] in poetry" article:

- April – William Gifford (died 1826), English satiric poet and literary editor
- July 25 (probable year) – Elizabeth Hamilton (died 1816), Irish-born Scottish essayist, poet and novelist
- November 13 – Edward Rushton (died 1814), English poet, bookseller and abolitionist

== Deaths ==
Birth years link to the corresponding "[year] in poetry" article:

- March 26 – Gilbert West (born 1703), English poet
- c. April 1 – Stephen Duck (born 1705), English "thresher poet", by suicide
- Frehat Bat Avraham, Jewish Poet

== See also ==
- Poetry
- List of years in poetry
