= 1768 in poetry =

List of years in poetry	(table)
- … 1758; 1759; 1760; 1761; 1762; 1763; 1764; 1765; 1766; 1767; 1768; 1769; 1770; 1771; 1772; 1773; 1774; 1775; 1776; 1777; 1778 …
- In literature 1765 1766 1767 1768 1769 1770 1771
- Art; Archaeology; Architecture; Literature; Music; Philosophy; Science; +...

Nationality words link to articles with information on the nation's poetry or literature (for instance, Irish or France).

== Events ==
=== Colonial America ===
- John Dickinson, "A Song for Freedom (Liberty Song)"
- Elizabeth Graeme Ferguson, "The Dream of the Patriotic Philosophical Farmer", political verse advocating an American embargo on British goods, Colonial America
- Milcah Martha Moore, "The Female Patriots. Address'd to the Daughters of Liberty in America, 1768", Colonial America
- Phillis Wheatley writes "To the King's Most Excellent Majesty," in which she praises George III for repealing the Stamp Act. Wheatley would later become a strong supporter of the American Revolution.
- "The Liberty Song" appears on July 16 in the Boston Gazette, called "probably the first American patriotic song"

=== United Kingdom ===
- Isaac Hawkins Browne, the elder, Poems Upon Various Subjects, Latin and English, edited by Isaac Hawkins Browne, the younger
- Thomas Gray, Poems by Mr Gray, including "The Fatal Sisters", "The Descent of Odin", "The Triumphs of Owen" but not "A Long Story"
- Richard Jago, Labour and Genius; or, The Mill-Stream, and the Cascade
- Lady Mary Montagu, Poetical Works
- Henry James Pye, Elegies on Different Occasions, published anonymously
- Alexander Ross, The Fortunate Sheperdess
- Christopher Smart, The Parables of Our Lord and Saviour Jesus Christ
- William Wilkie, Fables

=== Others ===
- Ephraim Luzzato, Ele Bene Hane'urim ("These Are the Sons of One's Youth"), Hebrew poetry published in London in an edition of 100 copies; more than 50 poems, mostly sonnets in quantitative-syllabic meters; many subsequent editions and influential among Hebrew poets of the Haskalah ("Enlightenment") movement in the 19th century.

== Births ==
Death years link to the corresponding "[year] in poetry" article:

- October 11 – William Shepherd, English dissenting minister, politician, poet and writer (died 1847)
- November 18 – Zacharias Werner, German religious poet (died 1823)
- Wang Zhenyi, Chinese Qing dynasty female poet and astronomer (died 1797)

== Deaths ==
Birth years link to the corresponding "[year] in poetry" article:

- March 28 – Thomas Mozeen, English actor and songwriter (born 1720?)
- August 17 (N. S.) – Vasily Kirillovich Trediakovsky, Russian poet (born 1703)
- December 20 – Carlo Innocenzio Maria Frugoni, Italian poet (born 1692)

== See also ==
- List of years in poetry
- List of years in literature
- 18th century in poetry
- 18th century in literature
- French literature of the 18th century
- Sturm und Drang (the conventional translation is "Storm and Stress"; a more literal translation, however, might be "storm and urge", "storm and longing", "storm and drive" or "storm and impulse"), a movement in German literature (including poetry) and music from the late 1760s through the early 1780s
- List of years in poetry
- Poetry
