= 1767 in poetry =

List of years in poetry	(table)
- … 1757; 1758; 1759; 1760; 1761; 1762; 1763; 1764; 1765; 1766; 1767; 1768; 1769; 1770; 1771; 1772; 1773; 1774; 1775; 1776; 1777 …
- In literature 1764 1765 1766 1767 1768 1769 1770
- Art; Archaeology; Architecture; Literature; Music; Philosophy; Science; +...

Nationality words link to articles with information on the nation's poetry or literature (for instance, Irish or France).

== Events ==
- About this year, the Sturm und Drang movement begins in German literature (including poetry) and music; it will last through the early 1780s. (The conventional translation is "Storm and Stress"; a more literal translation, however, might be "storm and urge", "storm and longing", "storm and drive" or "storm and impulse").

== Works published ==
- Michael Bruce, Elegy Written in Spring
- Francis Fawkes, Partridge-Shooting: An eclogue
- Oliver Goldsmith, editor, The Beauties of English Poesy, an anthology
- Francis Hopkinson, the Psalms of David [...] in Metre, English, Colonial America
- Richard Jago, Edge-Hill; or, The Rural Prospect Delineated and Moralised
- Henry Jones, Kew Gardens
- Moses Mendes, editor, A Collection of the Most Esteemed Pieces of Poetry, an anthology
- William Mickle, The Concubine (reissued as Sir Martin 1778)
- John Wesley and Charles Wesley, Hymns for the Use of Families
- Phillis Wheatley, a poem published in the Newport Mercury in Rhode Island. The author at this time was a 13-year-old slave girl in Boston, Massachusetts who had learned English at the age of seven when she arrived in America in 1761; Colonial America

== Works wrongly said to be published this year ==
- Oliver Goldsmith, editor, Poems for Young Ladies, an anthology; although the book states it was published this year, it first appeared in 1766

== Births ==
Death years link to the corresponding "[year] in poetry" article:

- March 1 – Alexander Balfour (died 1829), Scottish novelist, short-story writer and poet
- September 8 – August Wilhelm Schlegel (died 1845), German poet, translator, critic, and a leader of German Romanticism

== Deaths ==
Birth years link to the corresponding "[year] in poetry" article:

- May 17 – Roger Wolcott (born 1679), English Colonial American, governor of Connecticut and poet
- June 25 – Georg Philipp Telemann (died 1681), German composer and poet
- July 15 – Michael Bruce (born 1746), Scottish poet
- December 21 – Leonard Howard (born 1699?), English clergyman, "poet laureate of the King's Bench Prison"

== See also ==
- List of years in poetry
- List of years in literature
- 18th century in poetry
- 18th century in literature
- 18th-century French literature
- List of years in poetry
- Poetry
