= 1765 in poetry =

| List of years in poetry | (table) |
- … 1755; 1756; 1757; 1758; 1759; 1760; 1761; 1762; 1763; 1764; 1765; 1766; 1767; 1768; 1769; 1770; 1771; 1772; 1773; 1774; 1775 …
- In literature 1762 1763 1764 1765 1766 1767 1768
- Art; Archaeology; Architecture; Literature; Music; Philosophy; Science; +...

Nationality words link to articles with information on the nation's poetry or literature (for instance, Irish or France).

== Events ==
- October 10 – Samuel Johnson's edition of The Plays of William Shakespeare is published in London after ten years in the making.
- Approximate year – Beginning of the Sturm und Drang movement in German literature.

== Works published ==
=== United Kingdom ===
- James Beattie:
  - The Judgment of Paris
  - Verses Occasioned by the Death of Charles Churchill (died November 1764; see also Percival Stockdale's work, below)
- Benjamin Church, "The Times", English, Colonial America
- William Collins, The Poetical Works of William Collins, the author's first collected edition
- Oliver Goldsmith, The Traveller
- Edward Jerningham, An Elegy Written Among the Ruins of an Abbey
- James Macpherson, The Works of Ossian, contains Macpherson's purported translations (actually much edited, loosely translated fragments of Gaelic poetry, supplemented by his own versifying) of what he presents as the ancient poems Fingal (first published 1762) and Temora (first published 1763), as well as Hugh Blair's Critical Dissertation on the Poems of Ossian (also first published 1763)
- Mother Goose's Melody, including "Hush-a-bye, baby, on the tree top" and "Ding, dong, bell"
- Thomas Percy, Reliques of Ancient English Poetry, anthology in 3 volumes, including first publication of the Scottish ballad "Sir Patrick Spens"
- Christopher Smart, translator, A Translation of the Psalms of David, Biblical verses and original poetry:
  - translation, "A Song to David" (a translation first published 1763)
  - "Hymns and Spiritual Songs for the Fasts and Festivals of the Church of England"
- Percival Stockdale, Churchill Defended (see also James Beattie's work, above)

=== Other ===
- Charles Batteux, Cours de belles lettres (included in Principes de la littérature 1774); criticism; France

== Births ==
Death years link to the corresponding "[year] in poetry" article:

- January 2 – Manoah Bodman (died 1850), American poet
- February 11 – Elizabeth Cobbold, née Knipe (died 1824), English poet
- April 22 – James Grahame (died 1811), Scottish poet, lawyer and clergyman
- June 3 – Friederike Brun, née Münther (died 1835), Danish poet
- November 7 – William Taylor (died 1836), English scholar, critic, polyglot, and translator of German Romantic literature
- December 29 – Laurence Hynes Halloran (died 1831), English poet, unordained clergyman and felon; later schoolteacher, journalist and bigamist in Australia
- Mahmud Gami (died 1855), Indian, Kashmiri-language poet

== Deaths ==
Birth years link to the corresponding "[year] in poetry" article:

- March 20 – Paolo Antonio Rolli (born 1687), Italian librettist and poet
- April 3 – Jean Adams (born 1704), Scottish poet
- April 5 – Edward Young, 81 (born 1681), English poet
- April 21 – David Mallet (born 1705), Scottish dramatist and poet
- April 23 – Sarah Dixon (born 1761), English poet
- November 24 – William Dunkin (born c. 1709), Irish poet

== See also ==
- Poetry
- List of years in poetry
