= Galignani =

Galignani is an Italian surname. Notable people with the surname include:

- Giovanni Antonio Galignani (1757–1821), Italian newspaper publisher
- John Anthony Galignani (1796–1873), publishers of Paris, son of Giovanni
