= 1757 in literature =

This article contains information about the literary events and publications of 1757.

== Events ==
The Folio Bible printed by John Baskerville in 1763.

- February 16 – Jonathan Edwards becomes President of the institution that will become the Princeton University.
- April 16
  - The works of astronomer Galileo Galilei espousing heliocentrism are removed (with the approval of Pope Benedict XIV) from the Index Librorum Prohibitorum list of books banned by Roman Catholic Church, along with "all books teaching the earth's motion and the sun's immobility". Other works of the heliocentrists Galileo, Nicolaus Copernicus, Johannes Kepler, Diego de Zúñiga and Paolo Foscarini remain on the list.
  - In the wake of public unrest in the Kingdom of France, the King's Council issues a decree that bars anyone from writing and printing anything that would tend toward émouvoir les esprits (stir up popular sentiment) against the government, with the death penalty used for any violations of this decree.
- April 29 – Inside the house at Stratford-upon-Avon in Warwickshire known as Shakespeare's Birthplace, a bricklayer, identified as "Mosely", re-tiling the roof, discovers a supposed pro-Catholic testament of John Shakespeare, father of William Shakespeare, more than 150 years after the elder's death. The find starts "what remains one of the most controversial topics in Shakespeare studies" because of disagreements over its authenticity and date.
- May 3 – The Irish-born actress Peg Woffington, playing Rosalind in As You Like It, suffers a stroke on stage at the Theatre Royal, Covent Garden in London and never acts again.
- May 6 – Asylum confinement of Christopher Smart: The poet Christopher Smart is confined to St Luke's Hospital for Lunatics in London.
- May – The Baskerville typeface, designed by John Baskerville of Birmingham, England, is first used in a wove paper quarto edition of Virgil (Publii Virgilii Maronis Bucolica, Georgica, et Æneis).
- September – Pierre-Augustin Caron begins using the name Beaumarchais.
- September 9 – The Parlement of Toulouse orders a public burning of Jesuit author Hermann Busenbaum's Medulla Theologiae Morales because of its treatment of the subject of regicide.
- December 11 – On the death of Colley Cibber as Poet Laureate of Great Britain, the post is declined by Thomas Gray and passes to William Whitehead.
- unknown dates
  - Angelo Maria Bandini is appointed librarian of the Laurentian Library in Florence.
  - Robert Raikes becomes proprietor of the Gloucester Journal.
  - Horace Walpole begins the Strawberry Hill Press.
  - Thomas Warton is appointed Professor of Poetry at the University of Oxford.

== New books ==
=== Prose ===
- John Brown – An Estimate of the Manners and Principles of the Times
- Edmund Burke – A Philosophical Enquiry into the Origin of Our Ideas of the Sublime and Beautiful
- John Dalrymple – An Essay Towards a General History of Feudal Property in Great Britain
- Samuel Derrick (probable compiler) – Harris's List of Covent Garden Ladies (1st edn)
- Adam Ferguson – The Morality of Stage-Plays Seriously Considered
- Sarah Fielding – The Lives of Cleopatra and Octavia
- Edward and Elizabeth Griffith – A Series of Genuine Letters between Henry and Frances vols. i – ii.
- David Hume – The Natural History of Religion
- Soame Jenyns – A Free Inquiry into the Nature and Origin of Evil
- Richard Price – Review of the Principal Questions in Morals
- Madame Riccoboni – Lettres de Mistriss Fanny Butlerd.
- Tobias Smollett – A Complete History of England
- Horace Walpole – A Letter from Xo Ho, a Chinese Philosopher at London, to his Friend Lien Chi at Peking
- William Warburton – Remarks upon Mr. David Hume's Essay on the Natural History of Religion
- Joseph Warton – Essay on Pope
- John Wesley – The Doctrine of Original Sin

=== Drama ===
- Anonymous – The Taxes
- Phanuel Bacon – Humorous Ethics, or an Attempt to Cure the Vices and Follies of the Age by a Method Entirely New (5 plays)
- Denis Diderot – Le Fils naturel
- Samuel Foote – The Author
- David Garrick – Lilliput
- John Home – Douglas
- Tobias Smollett – The Reprisal

=== Poetry ===
- Robert Andrews – Eidyllia
- Cornelius Arnold – Poems
- Samuel Boyce – Poems
- John Gilbert Cooper as "Aristippus" – Epistles to the Great
- John Duncombe – The Feminead (answer to 1754's Feminiad)
- William Duncombe – The Works of Horace in English Verse (various translators).
- John Dyer – The Fleece
- Carlo Gozzi – La tartana degli influssi per l'anno 1756
- Thomas Gray – Odes
- William Thompson – Poems
- William Wilkie – Epigoniad
- Edward Young – The Works of the Author of Night Thoughts

== Births ==
- February 1 – John Philip Kemble, English actor (died 1823)
- February 6 – Julian Ursyn Niemcewicz, Polish poet and dramatist (died 1841)
- April 9 – Wojciech Bogusławski, Polish actor, director and dramatist (died 1829)
- July 21 – Basilius von Ramdohr, German journalist and critic (died 1822)
- November 9 – William Sotheby, English poet and translator (died 1833)
- November 13 – Archibald Alison, Scottish essayist and cleric (died 1839)
- November 28 – William Blake, English poet and artist (died 1827)
- November 27 (possible year) – Mary Robinson (née Darby), English poet, actress and royal mistress (died 1800)
- December 4 – Charles Burney, English classicist and book thief (died 1817)
- Unknown date – Giovanni Antonio Galignani, Italian publisher (died 1821)

== Deaths ==
- January 9 – Bernard Le Bovier de Fontenelle, French dramatist and author (born 1657)
- January 19 – Thomas Ruddiman, Scottish classical scholar, editor, printer and librarian (born 1674)
- March 1 – Edward Moore, English dramatist (born 1712)
- March 8 – Thomas Blackwell, Scottish classical scholar (born 1701)
- August 28 – David Hartley, English philosopher and psychologist (born 1705)
- December 11
  - Colley Cibber, English dramatist, actor-manager and Poet Laureate of Great Britain (born 1671)
  - Edmund Curll, English bookseller and publisher (born 1675)
- December 15 (burial) – John Dyer, a Welsh poet, painter and Anglican cleric (born 1699)

== In literature ==
- James Fenimore Cooper – The Last of the Mohicans: A Narrative of 1757 (1826)
