= 1699 in poetry =

Nationality words link to articles with information on the nation's poetry or literature (for instance, Irish or France).

== Events ==
- English poet Matthew Prior, while a secretary in the English embassy in France (since 1697), mentions in letters that he has been dining with Nicolas Boileau-Despréaux, a critic and poet (greatly admired in England for his verse) whose poems Prior had lampooned in 1695 and would again satirize in 1704. "Boileau says I have more genius than all the academy," Prior wrote to Edward Villiers, 1st Earl of Jersey in July. Villiers replied, "If you don't come quickly away, Boileau and that flattering country will spoil you." In his 1704 satire, Prior wrote:

[...] Old friend, old foe, for such we are
Alternate, as the chance of peace and war)

== Works ==
- Samuel Garth, The Dispensary
- John Hopkins, Milton's Paradise Lost imitated in Rhyme. In the Fourth, Sixth, and Ninth Books: Containing the Primitive Loves. The Battel of the Angels. The Fall of Man
- Thomas Hansen Kingo, Psalmebog, with 85 of his own compositions; still used in some parts of Denmark and Norway
- Thomas Traherne, A Serious and Pathetical Contemplation of the Mercies of God

== Births ==
Death years link to the corresponding "[year] in poetry" article:

- April 13 – Alexander Ross (died 1784), Scottish poet
- April 17 – Robert Blair (died 1746), Scottish poet
- August 13 (bapt.) – John Dyer (died 1757), Anglo-Welsh poet
- Mirza Mazhar Jan-e-Janaan (died 1781), Indian, Urdu-language poet
- Christopher Pitt (died 1748), English poet and translator
- Approximate date – Leonard Howard (died 1767), English clergyman and "poet laureate in the King's Bench"

== Deaths ==
Birth years link to the corresponding "[year] in poetry" article:

- April 22 – Hans Erasmus Aßmann (born 1646), German noble, statesman and poet
- November 23 – Joseph Beaumont (born 1616), English clergyman, academic and poet

== See also ==
- List of years in poetry
- List of years in literature
- 17th century in poetry
- 17th century in literature
- Poetry
