= 1686 in poetry =

This article covers 1686 in poetry. Nationality words link to articles with information on the nation's poetry or literature (for instance, Irish or France).

== Works published ==
- Sarah Fyge Egerton (later Sarah Field), The Female Advocate, published anonymously in reply to Robert Gould's Love Given O're 1682
- Thomas Flatman, A Song for St Caecilia's Day
- Anne Killigrew, Poems by Mrs Anne Killigrew
- Susanna Elizabeth Zeidler, Jungferlicher Zeitvertreiber (Pastime for Virgins)
- Matsuo Bashō publishes one of his best-remembered haiku:

furu ike ya / kawazu tobikomu / mizu no oto

an ancient pond / a frog jumps in / the splash of water [1686]

== Births ==
Death years link to the corresponding "[year] in poetry" article:

- Allan Ramsay (died 1758), Scottish poet
- Andrew Michael Ramsay (died 1743), Scottish-born writer and poet who lived most of his adult life in France

== Deaths ==
Birth years link to the corresponding "[year] in poetry" article:

- Shimonokōbe Chōryū (born 1624), Japanese poet-scholar

== See also ==
- Poetry
- 17th century in poetry
- 17th century in literature
- Restoration literature
