= Gummerup =

Village in Denmark

Coordinates: 55°15′N 10°08′E

Gummerup is a place in Glamsbjerg municipality on the island of Funen, central Denmark.

== Notable people ==
- Ambrosius Stub (born 1705 in Gummerup)
