= 1683 in poetry =

This article covers 1683 in poetry. Nationality words link to articles with information on the nation's poetry or literature (for instance, Irish or France).

== Works published ==
=== Great Britain ===
- Philip Ayres, Emblems of Love, later reissued under the title Cupids Addresse to the Ladies
- John Chalkhill, Thealma and Clearchus: A pastoral history, posthumously published; edited by Izaak Walton
- Thomas D'Urfey, A New Collection of Songs and Poems
- Thomas Flatman, On the Death of the Illustrious Prince Rupert, Prince Rupert died November 29 of this year
- Robert Gould, Presbytery Rough-Drawn, published anonymously
- John Mason, Spiritual Songs; or, Songs of Praise to Almighty God upon Several Occasions, published anonymously
- John Oldham, Poems, and Translations
- Thomas Shipman, Carolina; or, Loyal Poems

=== Other ===
- Benjamin Keach, Sion in Distress, or The Groans of the Protestant Church, English Colonial America
- Emilie Juliane of Schwarzburg-Rudolstadt, Geistliche Lieder [...], German hymns; published in Rudolstadt

== Births ==
Death years link to the corresponding "[year] in poetry" article:

- March 1 – Tsangyang Gyatso, 6th Dalai Lama (died 1706), Indian-born Monpa Buddhist religious leader and Tibetan poet
- May 20 – Elijah Fenton (died 1730), English poet
- July 3 – Edward Young (died 1765), English poet

== Deaths ==
Birth years link to the corresponding "[year] in poetry" article:

- December 9 – John Oldham (born 1653), English satirical poet and translator
- Katherine Austen (born 1629), English diarist and poet

== See also ==
- Poetry
- 17th century in poetry
- 17th century in literature
- Restoration literature
