= 1722 in poetry =

This article covers 1722 in poetry. Nationality words link to articles with information on the nation's poetry or literature (for instance, Irish or France).

== Works published ==
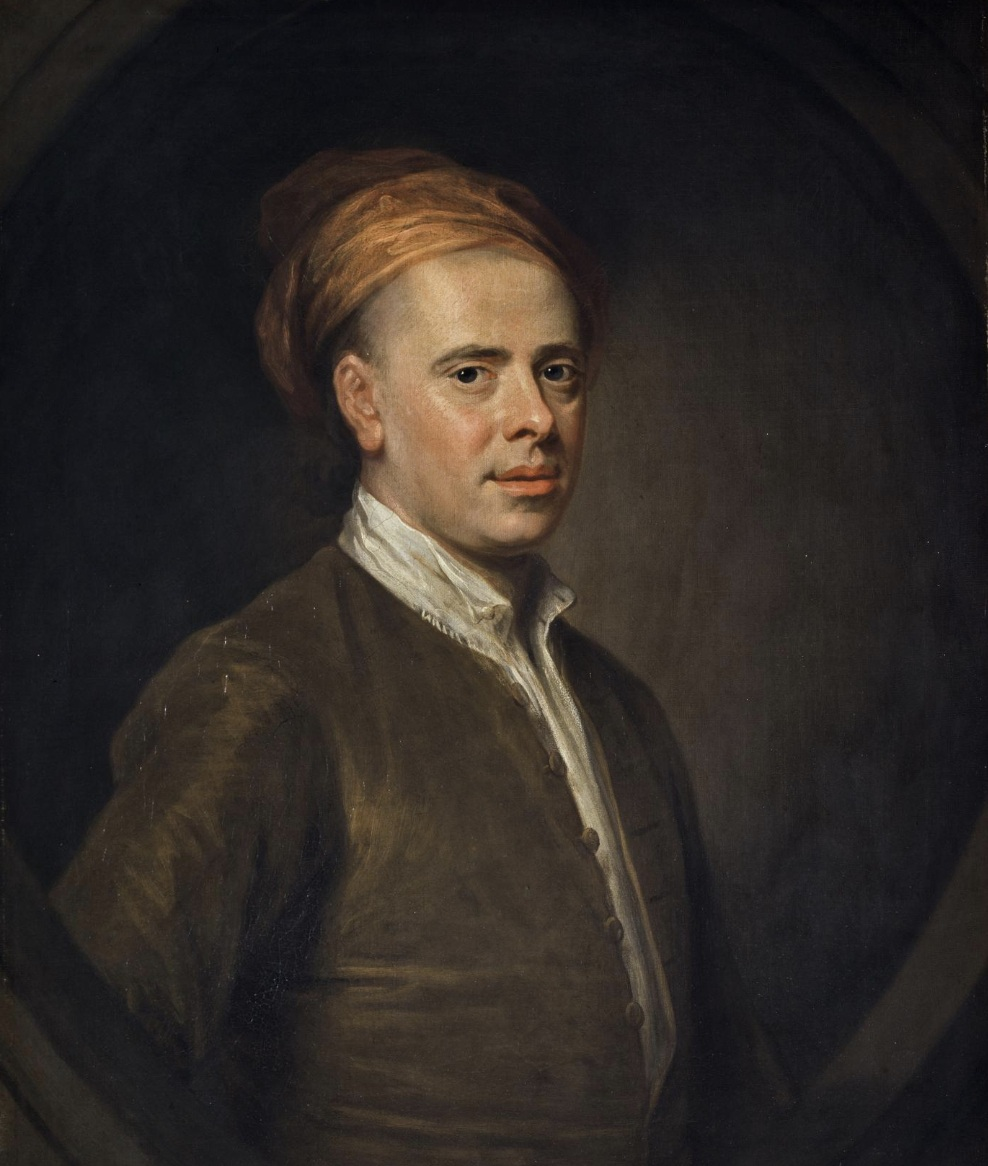
Portrait of Allan Ramsay, painted this year by William Aikman

- Thomas Cooke, Marlborough, the Duke of Marlborough died June 16
- Hildebrand Jacob, Bedlam, published this year, although the book states "1723"
- Thomas Parnell, Poems on Several Occasions
- Allan Ramsay, Fables and Tales
- Elizabeth Thomas, Miscellany Poems on Several Subjects, published anonymously
- Thomas Walter, The Sweet Psalmist of Israel, English, Colonial American

== Births ==
Death years link to the corresponding "[year] in poetry" article:

- February 7 – Azar Bigdeli (died 1781), Persian anthologist and poet
- February 26 – Mary Leapor (died 1746), English kitchenmaid poet
- April 11 – Christopher Smart (died 1771), English poet
- April 22 (bapt.) – Joseph Warton (died 1800), English poet and critic
- December 1 – Anna Louisa Karsch (died 1804), German
- Waris Shah (died 1798), Punjabi Sufi poet

== Deaths ==
Death years link to the corresponding "[year] in poetry" article:

- September 26 – Guillaume Massieu (born 1665), French churchman, translator and poet

== See also ==
- Poetry
- List of years in poetry
- List of years in literature
- 18th century in poetry
- 18th century in literature
- Augustan poetry
- Scriblerus Club

== Notes ==
- "A Timeline of English Poetry" Web page of the Representative Poetry Online Web site, University of Toronto
