= Miravan Breaking Open the Tomb of his Ancestors =

Painting by Joseph Wright of Derby

Miravan
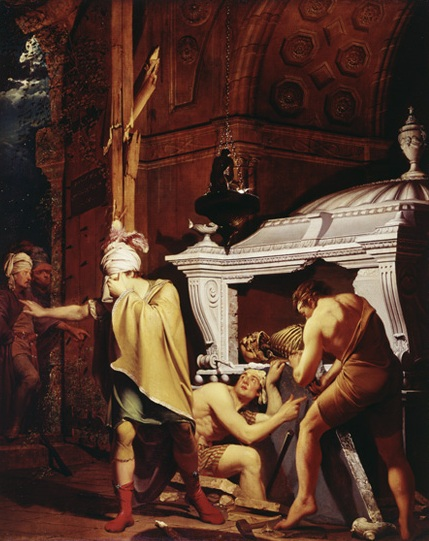
- Artist: Joseph Wright of Derby
- Year: 1772
- Dimensions: 127 cm × 101.6 cm (50 in × 40.0 in)
- Location: Derby Museum and Art Gallery, Derby

Miravan Breaking Open the Tomb of his Ancestors is a painting by Joseph Wright of Derby originally completed in 1772 .

== Description ==
The painting was titled Miravan Breaking Open the Tomb of his Ancestors and it shows a Persian nobleman, Miravan, who has discovered one of his ancestor's tombs. Driven by greed he orders that the tomb be broken open after he sees that the tomb's inscription claims that a "greater treasure than Croesus ever possessed" is within. The painting shows the revulsion of Miravan and his anguish when he realises that he has been tricked. The inscription he finds inside the tomb says that Miravan will not enjoy eternal repose as he has disturbed one of his progenitors.

The story of Miravan as explained by Joseph Wright comes from John Gilbert Cooper's Letters Concerning Taste which was published in 1755. Though Cooper claims that the story is Persian, no original source is known.

Joseph Wright was known for his studies under unusual lighting; this painting combines this characteristic with a style that has been called Neo-Gothic which Wright also used in his painting A Philosopher by Lamplight, also known as Democritus studying anatomy. These two paintings also show the artist's familiarity with human anatomy.

== History ==
The painting was engraved in 1772 by Valentine Green and like many of Wright's paintings its strong dark and light areas made it ideal for a mezzotint. In this case the view is lit by a single oil light supplemented by moonlight. The painting was bought in Wright's lifetime by Mr Milne (who may have been from Wakefield). It came into the possession of Derby Museum and Art Gallery in 1935 after being acquired from private ownership thanks to UK National funding.
