= 4th century BC in poetry =

== The Hellenistic World ==
=== Poets (by date of birth) ===
- Aratus of Soli (c. 315/310 - 240 BC), Macedonia, in Greek
- Theocritus (c. 310 - c. 250 BC), in Greek
- Callimachus (c. 305 - c. 240 BC), Alexandria, in Greek

== China ==
=== Poets (by date of birth) ===
- Qu Yuan (340 - 278 BC)

=== Works ===
- Chu Ci, the second great anthology of early Chinese poetry
