= 1688 in poetry =

Nationality words link to articles with information on the nation's poetry or literature (for instance, Irish or France).

== Events ==
- December – After John Dryden refuses to swear allegiance to the new monarchy following the Glorious Revolution, the writer is dismissed as Poet Laureate of the United Kingdom, the only laureate not to die in office until the initiation of fixed-term appointments with Andrew Motion in 1999. Dryden is replaced in 1689 by his old enemy, Thomas Shadwell, who holds the office until his death in 1692.
- Fourth (and first illustrated) edition of John Milton's Paradise Lost published by Jacob Tonson in London; the artists include John Baptist Medina.
- Poet and city founder Francis Daniel Pastorius signs a protest against slavery, the first one made in the English colonies.

== Works published ==
- Richard Ames, Sylvia's Revenge; or, A Satyr Against Man, published anonymously; response to Robert Gould's Love Given O're 1682 (see also Sylvia's Complaint 1692)
- Jane Barker and others, Poetical Recreations
- Aphra Behn, A Congratulatory Poem to Her Most Sacred Majesty, addressed to Queen Mary, on the birth of James Francis Edward Stuart on 10 June
- Thomas Brown, The Reasons of Mr. Bays Changing his Religion, published anonymously; about John Dryden (see also The Late Converts Exposed 1690)
- John Bunyan, A Discourse of the Building, Nature, Excellency, and Government of the House of God
- John Dryden, Britannia Rediviva, on the birth of James Francis Edward Stuart
- George Wither, Divine Poems on the Ten Commandments

== Births ==
Death years link to the corresponding "[year] in poetry" article:

- 7 February – John Morgan (died 1733 or 1734), Welsh clergyman, scholar and poet
- 2 April (baptised) – Lewis Theobald (died 1744), English poet, playwright, translator and editor of Shakespeare
- 21 May – Alexander Pope (died 1744), English poet
- 3 June (baptised) – Leonard Welsted (died 1747), English poet and "dunce" in Alexander Pope's writings
- 6 September (baptised) – Laurence Eusden (died 1730), English poet, Poet Laureate from 1718
- 9 October (probable date of baptism) – Mary Collier (died 1762), English poet and washerwoman
- Upendra Bhanja born either 1670 or this year (died 1740), poet of Oriya Literature awarded the title "Kavi-Samrata" - "The Emperor of the Poets"
- William Meston (died 1745), Scottish poet

== Deaths ==
Birth years link to the corresponding "[year] in poetry" article:

- 26 November – Philippe Quinault (born 1635), French dramatist, poet and librettist
- 8 December – Thomas Flatman (born 1635), English poet and miniature painter
- Marcela de San Félix (born 1605), Spanish religious sister, poet and dramatist, daughter of Lope de Vega

== See also ==
- List of years in poetry
- List of years in literature
- 17th century in poetry
- 17th century in literature
- Restoration literature
- Poetry
