= 3rd century BC in poetry =

This article describes aspects of poetry in the 3rd century B.C.

== Mediterranean World ==
=== Poets (by date of birth) ===
- Apollonius of Rhodes (c. 295 - after 246 BCE), Greek
- Ennius (239 - 169 BCE), Salento, Latin

Date unknown:

- Herodas, Greek
- Theocritus, Greek
- Anyte of Tegea, Greek woman poet

=== Works ===
- Likely date for the Book of Job, written in Hebrew
- Aetia by Callimachus

== China ==
=== Poets (by date of birth) ===
- Song Yu

=== Works ===
- Chu Ci, the second great anthology of early Chinese poetry
