= 1705 in poetry =

Nationality words link to articles with information on the nation's poetry or literature (for instance, Irish or France).

== Events ==
- George Hickes' Linguarum veterum septentrionalium thesaurus grammatico-criticus et archæologicus vol. 2 (published in Oxford) includes the first published reference to Beowulf and the only surviving transcript of the Finnesburg Fragment.
- William Somervile inherits his father's estate, where his participation in field sports will furnish the material for much of his poetry.
- William Walsh begins his correspondence with Alexander Pope.

== Works published ==
- Daniel Defoe:
  - The Double Welcome: A poem to the Duke of Marlbro
  - The Dyet of Poland, published anonymously; a verse history of "Poland" (in fact, Britain during Queen Anne's 1st parliament)
- John Dennis, The Grounds of Criticism in Poetry
- Bernard Mandeville, The Grumbling Hive: or Knaves Turned Honest, anonymously published poem, also in a pirated edition, which becomes immediately popular. In 1714, Mandeville republishes the poem, together with an essay titled An Enquiry into the Origin of Moral Virtue and titles the whole The Fable of the Bees: or Private Vices, Public Benefits. In 1723, he adds an attack on charity schools and an essay attacking Shaftesbury. The final version, with a further expansion, is published in 1733
- John Philips:
  - Blenheim, published anonymously
  - The Splendid Shilling: An imitation of Milton, published anonymously
- Matthew Prior, An English Padlock, published anonymously
- Complete Tang Poems, Chinese anthology
- Ned Ward, Hudibras Redivivus; or, A Burlesque Poem on the Times, published anonymously, in two volumes of 12 parts each; first volume published August 1705 to July 1706; second volume published August 1706 to June 1707
- Isaac Watts, Horae Lyricae, published this year, although book states "1706"
- John Wilmot, Earl of Rochester (died 1680), Poems on Several Occasions; with Valentinian; a Tragedy, London: Printed for Jacob Tonson

== Births ==
Death years link to the corresponding "[year] in poetry" article:

- January 21 – Isaac Hawkins Browne (died 1760), English poet
- March 20 – Johann Sigismund Scholze (died 1750), German poet
- May – Ambrosius Stub (died 1758), Danish poet
- year uncertain
  - Stephen Duck (died 1756), English poet
  - Kunchan Nambiar (died 1770), Malayalam language poet, performer and satirist

== Deaths ==
Birth years link to the corresponding "[year] in poetry" article:

- January 10 – Étienne Pavillon (born 1632), French lawyer and poet
- June 10 – Michael Wigglesworth (born 1631), English clergyman and poet in America, "the most popular of early New England poets"

== See also ==
- Poetry
- List of years in poetry
- List of years in literature
- 18th century in poetry
- 18th century in literature
