= 5th century BC in poetry =

== Ancient Greece ==
=== Poets (by date of birth) ===
- Phrynichus (tragic poet) (6th c. BC - post 475 BC)
- Aeschylus (525 - 456 BC)
- Pindar (ca. 518 - ca. 438 BC)
- Sophocles (495 - 405 BC)
- Euripides (480 - 406 BC)
- Critias (460 - 403 BC)
- Aristophanes (ca. 460 - 403 BC)
- Phrynichus (comic poet) (5th c. BC)

== India ==
=== Events ===
- Bimbisara, king of Magadha, hires poets to recite poems to his wife Khema describing the beauty of the monastery at which Gautama Buddha is staying in order to entice her to visit (approximate date)
