= 1828 in poetry =

Nationality words link to articles with information on the nation's poetry or literature (for instance, Irish or France).

== Events ==
- The Southern Review, an American quarterly literary magazine, begins publication in Charleston, South Carolina, it champions Southern culture and literature (Another, unrelated, publication of the same name was started in 1935)
- John Neal, The Yankee magazine volume 1, the first substantial published criticism of poetry by John Greenleaf Whittier and Henry Wadsworth Longfellow

== Works published ==
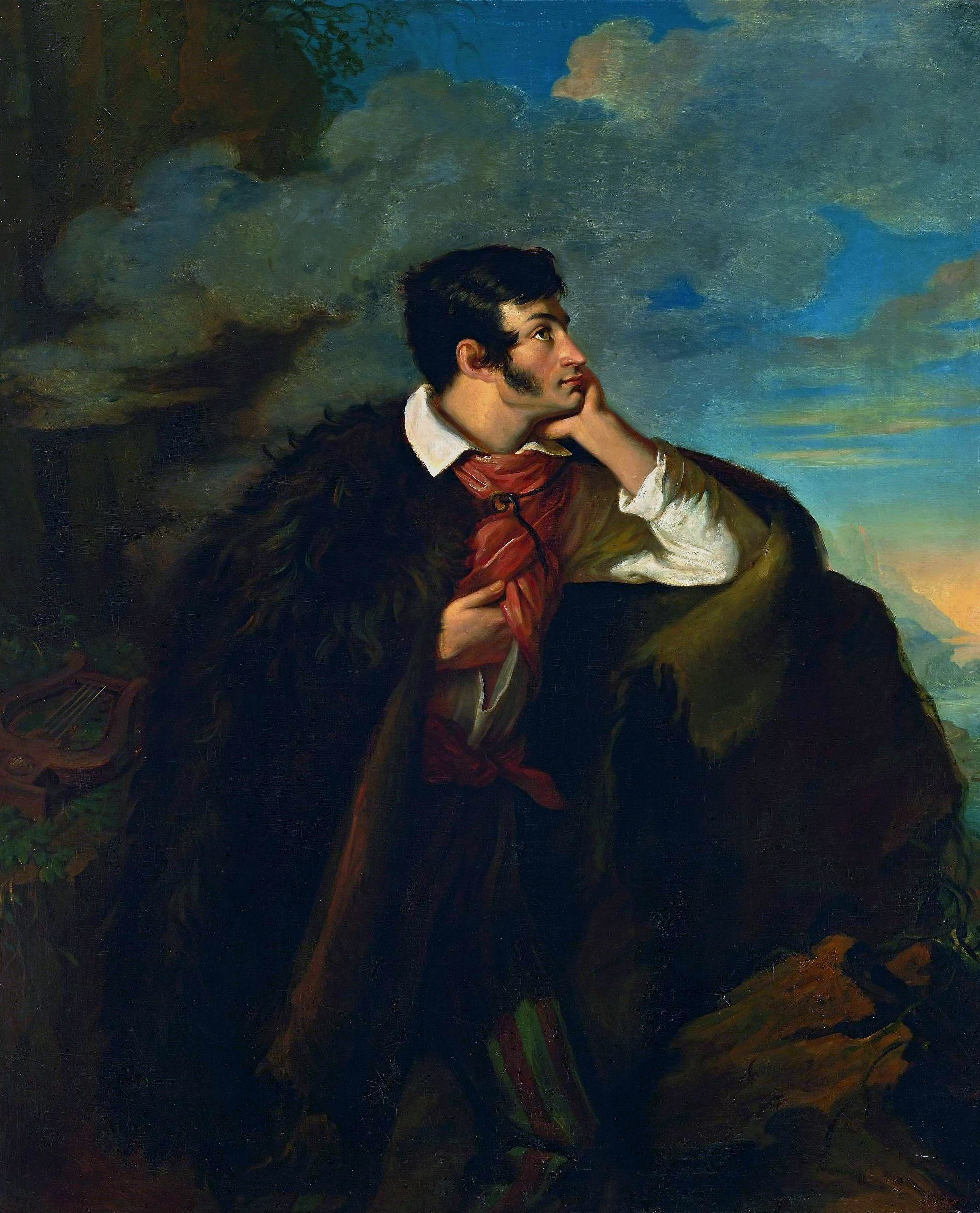
Adam Mickiewicz on the Ayu-Dag, by Walenty Wańkowicz, 1828

=== United Kingdom ===
- Edwin Atherstone, The Fall of Nineveh
- Laman Blanchard, Lyric Offerings
- William Lisle Bowles, Days Departed; or, Banwell Hill, a lay of the Severn Sea
- Mary Ann Browne, Ada, and Other Poems
- Thomas Campbell, The Poetical Works of Thomas Campbell
- Samuel Taylor Coleridge, The Poetical Works of S. T. Coleridge
- Felicia Hemans, Records of Women, with Other Poems
- John Gibson Lockhart, Life of Robert Burns, biography
- Robert Montgomery, The Omnipresence of the Deity
- Catherine Eliza Richardson, Poems
- Samuel Rogers, Italy: a Poem. Part the Second (Part the First published in 1822)
- Joseph Blanco White, "Night and Death"

=== United States ===
- Carlos Wilcox, Ramains, 14 sermons and two poems, "The Age of Benevolence" and "The Religion of Taste"
- Catharine Read Arnold Williams, Original Poems on Various Subjects, United States

=== Other ===
- Henry Louis Vivian Derozio, The Fakeer of Jungheera: A Metrical Tale and Other Poems, Calcutta: Samuel Smith and Co.; India, Indian poetry in English
- Adam Mickiewicz, Konrad Wallenrod, a long narrative poem set in 14th-century Lithuania; Poland
- Gérard de Nerval, translator, Faust, translation into French from the original German of Johann Wolfgang von Goethe's long poem; the work earned Nerval his reputation; it was praised by Goethe, and Hector Berlioz later used sections for his legend-symphony La Damnation de Faust
- Christian Winther, Traesnitt ("Woodcuts"); Denmark

== Births ==
Death years link to the corresponding "[year] in poetry" article:

- February 12 – George Meredith (died 1909), English novelist and poet
- April 1 – Roderick Flanagan (died 1862), Irish-born Australian journalist, poet and historian
- May 12 – Dante Gabriel Rossetti (died 1882), English Pre-Raphaelite painter and poet
- May 25 – James McIntyre (died 1906), Scottish-born Canadian "Poet of Cheese"
- August 19 – Arthur Munby (died 1910), English diarist, poet, portrait photographer and lawyer
- September 15 – Dolores Cabrera y Heredia (died 1899), Spanish Romantic poet and novelist, member of Hermandad Lírica

== Deaths ==
Birth years link to the corresponding "[year] in poetry" article:

- January 5 – Kobayashi Issa 小林一茶 (born 1763), Japanese poet and Buddhist priest known for his haiku poems and journals; widely regarded as one of the four haiku masters in Japan, along with Bashō, Buson and Shiki
- January 26 – Lady Caroline Lamb (born 1785), English aristocrat, novelist and poet
- April 11 – Edward Coote Pinkney (born 1802), English-born American poet, lawyer, sailor, professor and editor
- June 21 – Leandro Fernández de Moratín (born 1760), Spanish dramatist, translator and neoclassical poet
- September 26 – John Gardiner Calkins Brainard (born 1795), American lawyer, editor and poet
- date not known – Elizabeth Sophia Tomlins (born 1763), English novelist and occasional poet

== See also ==
- Poetry
- List of years in poetry
- List of years in literature
- 19th century in literature
- 19th century in poetry
- Romantic poetry
- Golden Age of Russian Poetry (1800–1850)
- Weimar Classicism period in Germany, commonly considered to have begun in 1788 and to have ended either in 1805, with the death of Friedrich Schiller, or 1832, with the death of Goethe
- List of poets
