= John Anthony Galignani =

French publisher (1796–1873)

- Born: October 13, 1796; London, England
- Died: 1873 (aged 76–77); Paris, France
- Occupations: Publisher, bookshop owner, philanthropist
- Awards: Knight of the Legion of Honour

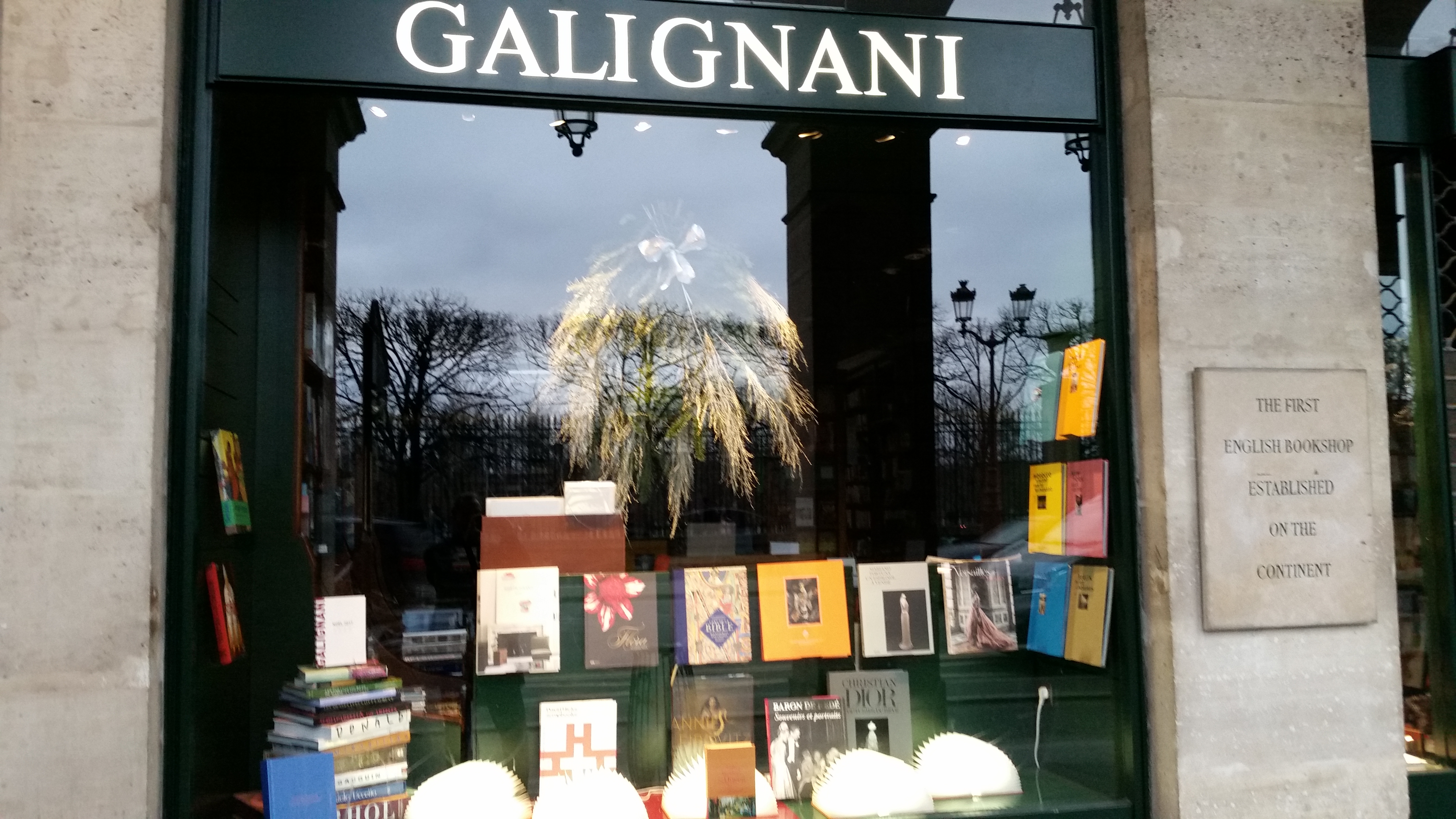
Galignani bookstore on the Rue de Rivoli, Paris

John Anthony Galignani (1796–1873), together with his brother, William (1798–1882), was a publisher and bookshop owner in Paris.

== Family ==
They were the sons of Giovanni Antonio Galignani (1757–1821), by Anne Parsons (1776–1822). The surname probably derived from the village of Gallignano, near Cremona; Giovanni was a native of Brescia. There is a tradition that the father was originally a courier. In 1793 he taught Italian, German, and English at Paris. He thence removed to London, where in 1796 he published twenty-four lectures on a new method of learning Italian without grammar or dictionary. A second edition of this work was issued by Montucci in 1806. Galignani apparently married in London, and his two sons were born there, the elder on 13 October 1796, the younger on 10 March 1798. Shortly after William's birth Giovanni Antonio Galignani returned to Paris, where he and his wife offered linguistic breakfasts and teas to persons desirous of mastering English or Italian, but for the latter language there appears to have been little demand, and "Mrs. Parsons-Galignani" established an English bookshop and circulating library.

In 1801 the Galignanis started a monthly (in 1817 it became a weekly) 'Repertory of English Literature.' A third son, Charles Alphonse, was born at Paris in 1811; he died at Geneva in 1829. On the fall of Napoleon in 1814 the father commenced issuing guide-books and founded 'Galignani's Messenger,' which was at first a tri-weekly but speedily became a daily paper, circulated among English residents all over Europe, as the stamp duty and postage rendered London journals expensive. In 1815 he published a Paris guide in English and German, on opposite pages, for the use of officers of the allied troops.

== Reprinting business and bookshop ==
The elder son, while still under age, opened a bookshop at Cambrai, but returned to Paris at or before his father's death, when he became the chief partner. The two brothers issued reprints of many English books, sometimes paying authors for advance-sheets. Sir Walter Scott, for instance, on visiting what he calls the 'old pirate's den' in 1826, was, 'after some palaver,' offered a hundred guineas for sheets of his 'Life of Napoleon.' The 'den' was at the bottom of a court, 18 rue Vivienne, and though so central, a garden with large trees was attached to it. It served as a club for English residents and visitors, who paid six francs a month, the reading room containing English and continental newspapers and eighteen thousand books. Both brothers obtained denizenship in December 1830, and in 1832 William was naturalised, Anthony (he had dropped his first name) remaining a British subject. In 1838 Thackeray, then in Paris, wrote for the 'Messenger.'

== Philanthropy ==
In 1852 the copyright treaty put a stop to Galignani's reprints, and in 1855 the establishment was removed to the rue de Rivoli. A flourishing business and investments in house property brought the brothers a large fortune, of which they made a munificent use. Having a country house at Étiolles, of which parish William was for more than twenty years mayor, they presented the adjoining town of Corbeil with a hospital and extensive grounds. They were also liberal contributors to British charities in Paris, and erected at Neuilly a hospital for indigent English (now converted into an orphanage). In 1866 the British government presented them with a silver epergne in recognition of their benevolent efforts. Anthony, who was unmarried, died 29 Dec. 1873, and William, a widower since 1862, without issue, died 11 Dec. 1882. The elder was knight and the younger officer of the Legion of Honour. The latter bequeathed a site and funds for the erection at Neuilly of the 'Retraite Galignani freres' for a hundred inmates, fifty of them to pay five hundred francs yearly for their maintenance, the other fifty to be admitted gratuitously and to comprise ten booksellers or printers, twenty savants, and ten authors or artists, or parents, widows, or daughters of such. The aggregate benefactions of the brothers amount to between five and six million francs. A fine sculpture of them, by Chapu, has been erected at Corbeil.

"Upon his death in 1882, William Galignani left the company to his nephew, Charles Jeancourt-Galignani."

== See also ==
- List of works by Henri Chapu
