= 7th century BC in poetry =

== India ==
=== Poets ===
- Approximate date of Valmiki

=== Works ===
- Approximate date of the Ramayana

== Ancient Greece ==
=== Poets (by date of birth) ===
- Homer, born near or before the beginning of the century
- Hesiod, born near or before the beginning of the century in Boeotia
- Callinus (c. 740 - c. 665 BC)
- Tyrtaeus (c. 700 - c. 640 BC)
- Archilochus of Paros (born c. 700)
- Alcman (dates unknown)
- Semonides
- Solon (ca. 638–558 BCE)
- Mimnermus of Colophon (fl. 630-600)
- Stesichorus (640 - 555 BCE), Himera, Sicily
- Sappho (c. 630 - 570 BCE)
- Alcaeus (born c. 620 in Mytilene)
- Eumelus of Corinth (late 7th century BC)

=== Works ===
- Odyssey
- Iliad
- Theogony
- Works and Days
- Homeric Hymns
- Aethiopis [fragments]
- Little Iliad [fragments]
- Iliou persis ("Sack of Troy") [fragments]
- Nostoi [fragments]
- Telegony [fragments]
- Cypria [fragments]
- Oedipodea [fragments]
- Thebaid [fragments]
- Epigoni [fragments]
- Alcmeonis (fragments)

== Middle East ==
=== Works ===
- King Assurbanipal's library holds tablets that include versions of the Epic of Gilgamesh and Enûma Elish

== China ==
=== Poets (by date of birth) ===
- Lady Xu Mu
