= 1531 in poetry =

This article covers 1531 in poetry. Nationality words link to articles with information on the nation's poetry or literature (for instance, Irish or France).

== Works published ==
- John Skelton, Colin Clout, publication year uncertain
- First translation into French of Les Triomphes ("Triumphs") of Petrarch
- Marguerite de Navarre, Le Miroir de l'ame Pecheresse, long devotional poem

== Births ==
Death years link to the corresponding "[year] in poetry" article:

- Ercole Bottrigari (died 1612), Italian scholar, mathematician, poet, music theorist, architect, and composer

== Deaths ==
Birth years link to the corresponding "[year] in poetry" article:

- October 11 - Huldrych Zwingli (born 1484), Swiss theologian, priest, poet and writer, killed in Second War of Kappel

== See also ==
- Poetry
- 16th century in poetry
- 16th century in literature
- French Renaissance literature
- Renaissance literature
- Spanish Renaissance literature
