= 1718 in poetry =

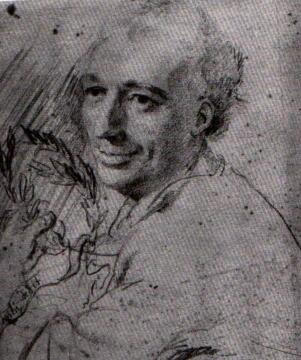
Laurence Eusden, appointed British Poet Laureate

Nationality words link to articles with information on the nation's poetry or literature (for instance, Irish or France).

== Events ==
- Laurence Eusden made British Poet Laureate

== Works published ==
- Joseph Addison:
  - Poems on Several Occasions, published this year, although the book states "1719"
  - The Resurrection, Latin poetry by Addison with an English translation attributed to Nicholas Amhurst
- Nicholas Amhurst
  - Protestant Popery; or, The Convocation (part of the Bangorian Controversy)
  - See The Resurrection, above
- Cotton Mather, Psalterium Americanum: The Book of Psalms in a Translation Exactly Conformed unto the Original, but All in Blank Verse, a translation in blank verse, with his analysis of poetry, English Colonial America
- Lady Mary Wortley Montagu, "Constantinople", circulated privately
- Alexander Pope, translator, Homer's Iliad, Volume IV (Books 13–16) this year, preceded by Volume I (Books 1–4) in 1715, Volume II (Books 5–8) in 1716, Volume III (Books 9–12) in 1717 and to be followed by Volume V (Books 17–21) and Volume VI (Books 22–24), both in 1720
- Matthew Prior, Alma; or, The Progress of the Mind
- Allan Ramsay, Scots Songs (see also Scots Songs 1719)
- John Wilmot, Earl of Rochester, Remains of the Right Honourable John, Earl of Rochester. Being Satyrs, Songs, and Poems; Never before Published. From a Manuscript found in a Gentleman's Library that was Contemporary with him, London: Printed for Tho. Dryar & sold by T. Harbin, W. Chetwood & the booksellers of London & Westminster, posthumous

== Births ==
Death years link to the corresponding "[year] in poetry" article:

- November 28 – Hedvig Charlotta Nordenflycht (died 1763), Swedish poet, feminist and salon-hostess
- date unknown – Ramprasad Sen (died 1775), Shakta poet of Bengal

== Deaths ==
Birth years link to the corresponding "[year] in poetry" article:

- February 18 – Peter Anthony Motteux (born 1663), English playwright, translator, editor, author and poet
- May 22 – Gaspard Abeille (born 1648), French lyric and tragic poet
- October 24 – Thomas Parnell (born 1679), Irish poet and clergyman, member of the Scriblerus Club
- December 6 – Nicholas Rowe (born 1674), English poet and dramatist
- date unknown – Wu Li (born 1632), Chinese landscape painter and poet

== See also ==
- Poetry
- List of years in poetry
- List of years in literature
- 18th century in poetry
- 18th century in literature
- Augustan poetry
- Scriblerus Club

== Notes ==
- "A Timeline of English Poetry" Web page of the Representative Poetry Online Web site, University of Toronto
