= George Cockings =

English writer

George Cockings (died 6 February 1802) was an English writer.

== Career ==
Cockings began his professional career working for the British government in Boston, USA. On his return to England, he became the registrar of the Society of Arts, Manufactures, and Commerce at the Adelphi. He died on 6 February 1802, after holding that post for thirty years.

His American experiences led him to write poems and dramas, "which, in respect of construction and literary style, are of the feeblest order." Some of these obtained a measure of success, and went through three or four editions in America and England.

His writings include The Conquest of Canada, or the Siege of Quebec (1766) an historical tragedy in five acts "a contemptible production without either form or significance;" "Benevolence and Gratitude", a poem, London (1772), "War, an Heroic Poem, from the Taking of Minorca by the French to the Reduction of the Havannah", a 28-page poem supporting British generals (1760), Poems on several Subjects, London (1772), "Arts, Manufactures, and Commerce" a poem, London (1766).
