= 1st century in poetry =

== India ==
=== Poets (by date of birth) ===
- Thirukural (31-), Thiruvalluvar

== Roman empire ==
=== Events ===
- 8 - Exile of Ovid: Ovid is banished for the remainder of his life to Tomis on the Black Sea by personal intervention of the Emperor Augustus

=== Poets (by date of birth) ===
- Ovid (43BCE-17)
- Columella (4-70), Cádiz?
- Persius (34-62), Etruscan
- Quintilian (35-95)
- Lucan (Nov. 3, 39 - Apr. 3, 65), Hispania Baetica
- Statius (45-96), Naples
- Martial (86-103), Hispania

Dates not known:

- Caesius Bassus (died in Eruption of Mount Vesuvius in 79 (Aug. 24))
- Calpurnius, Sicily?
- Manilius
- Juvenal
- Sulpicia

=== Works ===
- Marcus Manilius (probable author), Astronomica (c. 10-20)
- Ovid, Tristia (c. 9-12) and Epistulae ex Ponto (c. 13-16)
- Statius, Thebaid (c. 90), Silvae (c. 93–96) and Achilleid (c. 94–96, unfinished)

== China ==
=== Poets (by date of birth) ===
- Zhang Heng (78-139), Eastern Han
- Ban Gu (32-92)

== Decades and years ==
| 090s | 090 | 091 | 092 | 093 | 094 | 095 | 096 | 097 | 098 | 099 |
| 000s | 000 | 001 | 002 | 003 | 004 | 005 | 006 | 007 | 008 | 009 |
| 010s | 010 | 011 | 012 | 013 | 014 | 015 | 016 | 017 | 018 | 019 |
| 020s | 020 | 021 | 022 | 023 | 024 | 025 | 026 | 027 | 028 | 029 |
| 030s | 030 | 031 | 032 | 033 | 034 | 035 | 036 | 037 | 038 | 039 |
| 040s | 040 | 041 | 042 | 043 | 044 | 045 | 046 | 047 | 048 | 049 |
| 050s | 050 | 051 | 052 | 053 | 054 | 055 | 056 | 057 | 058 | 059 |
| 060s | 060 | 061 | 062 | 063 | 064 | 065 | 066 | 067 | 068 | 069 |
| 070s | 070 | 071 | 072 | 073 | 074 | 075 | 076 | 077 | 078 | 079 |
| 080s | 080 | 081 | 082 | 083 | 084 | 085 | 086 | 087 | 088 | 089 |
| 090s | 090 | 091 | 092 | 093 | 094 | 095 | 096 | 097 | 098 | 099 |
| 100s | 100 | 101 | 102 | 103 | 104 | 105 | 106 | 107 | 108 | 109 |
