= Susanna Elizabeth Zeidler =

German author and women's right activist of the 17th century

Susanna Elizabeth Zeidler (1657 – c. 1706) was a German poet.

In 1686 Zeidler published Jungferlicher Zeitvertreiber (Pastime for Virgins), a collection of poems.

Along with other German women writers of Baroque style like Anna Ovena Hoyer and Sibylla Schwarz, Susanna Elizabeth Zeidler championed women's rights, chiefly the right for women to participate in the public and literary world. Her work Beglau-bigung der Jungfer Poeterey, published in 1686, is considered a classic text on the defense of women's right to authorship.
