= 1512 in poetry =

This article covers 1512 in poetry Nationality words link to articles with information on the nation's poetry or literature (for instance, Irish or France).

== Works published ==
- Anonymous, Syr Degore, publication year uncertain; written before 1325; in couplets; Great Britain
- Hieronymus Angerianus, Erotopaegnion, Italian poet writing in Latin
- Stephen Hawes, The Comfort of Lovers, London: Wynkyn de Worde; Great Britain
- Thomas Murner, Germany:
  - Schelmenzunft ("Guild of Rogues"); in which the narrator is the chosen scribe of the guild, with the duty of describing each member
  - Narrenbeschwörung ("Muster of Fools")

== Births ==
Death years link to the corresponding "[year] in poetry" article:

- Thomas Becon (died 1567), English (approximate date)
- Christovão Falcão (died c. 1557), Portuguese (approximate date)
- Thomas Sébillet (died 1589), French

== Deaths ==
Birth years link to the corresponding "[year] in poetry" article:

== See also ==
- Poetry
- 16th century in poetry
- 16th century in literature
- French Renaissance literature
- Grands Rhétoriqueurs
- Renaissance literature
- Spanish Renaissance literature
