= 1st century BC in poetry =

== Roman republic/Roman empire ==
=== Poets (by date of birth) ===
- Lucretius (94 - 49 BCE)
- Catullus (84 -54 BCE)
- Virgil (Oct. 15, 70 - Sept. 21, 19 BCE)
- Gallus (69 - 26 BC), Egypt
- Horace (Dec. 8, 65 - Nov. 27, 8 BC)
- Tibullus (54 - 19 BCE)
- Propertius (50 - 15/2 BCE), Bevagna
- Ovid (Mar 20, 43 BCE - 17 CE)

Unknown Date:

- Sulpicia - the only woman poet of Ancient Rome whose works survive
- Meleager of Gadara

=== Works ===
- Meleager of Gadara gathers an anthology of short poems and epigrams that would become the basis for the Greek Anthology

== South Asia ==
=== Works ===
- The Pali Canon is first written down (estimated)
- The Tolkappiyam, a Tamil grammar written in verse

== China ==
=== Poets (by year of birth) ===
- Yang Xiong (53 BCE - 18 CE)

== Korea ==
=== Poets (by year of birth) ===
- Yuri of Goguryeo, (reigned c. 17 BCE to 18 CE)
