= 2nd century in poetry =

== Roman empire ==
=== Poets ===
- Juvenal, in Latin
- Oppian of Corycus in Cilicia, writing in Greek
- Lucian of Assyria, writing in Greek
- Straton of Sardis, writing in Greek

== Persia ==
=== Works ===
- latest likely date for the Drakht-i Asurig, the earliest known Pahlavi poem

== China ==
=== Poets (by date of birth) ===
- Cao Cao (155-220), Eastern Han
- Cao Pi (187-226), Eastern Han
- Cao Zhi (192-232), Eastern Han
