= 1653 in poetry =

This article covers 1653 in poetry. Nationality words link to articles with information on the nation's poetry or literature (for instance, Irish or France).

== Works published ==
- Margaret Cavendish, Lady Newcastle, Poems, and Fancies, prose and poetry
- An Collins, Divine Songs and Meditacions
- William Davenant, A Discourse upon Gondibert, an heroick poem, a philosophical preface to his epic poem Gondibert, third edition (officially second edition), with this one including "Certain Verses, written by severall of the author’s friends" (first published 1650 unfinished, then published again in 1651 in its final form, with a preface and commendatory verses; see also The Seventh and Last Canto of the Third Book of Gondibert, 1685)
- Richard Flecknoe, translator, Miscellania; or, Poems of all Sorts, prose and poetry
- Henry Lawes, Ayeres and Dialogues
- Sir Thomas Urquhart, The First Book of the Works of Mr Francis Rabelais, Doctor in Physick, published anonymously; verse translation from the French of François Rabelais' Gargantua and Pantagruel; Second Book also published this year (Third Book, wrongly dated "1693", published in The Works of F. Rabelais MD by Sir Tho. Urchard Kt and Others 1694)
- George Wither, The Dark Lantern

== Births ==
Death years link to the corresponding "[year] in poetry" article:

- August 9 – John Oldham (died 1683), English satirical poet
- Thomas d'Urfey (died 1723), English writer of plays, songs, poetry and jokes

== Deaths ==
Birth years link to the corresponding "[year] in poetry" article:

- February 13 – Georg Rudolf Weckherlin (born 1584), German poet and diplomat
- October 15 – Piaras Feiritéar (born c.1600), Irish poet and rebel (hanged)
- October 26 – Honorat de Porchères Laugier (born 1572), French poet
- November – Jacques de Serisay (born 1594), French poet and founding director of the Académie française
- December – John Taylor (born 1578), English "waterman poet"
- William Basse died this year or 1654 (born 1583), English poet
- Marusia Churai (born 1625), semi-mythical Ukrainian Baroque composer, poet and singer

== See also ==
- Poetry
- 17th century in poetry
- 17th century in literature
