= 2nd century BC in poetry =

== China ==
=== Poets (by date of birth) ===
- Jia Yi (200 - 168 BCE)
- Sima Xiangru (179-117 BCE), Western Han
- Sima Qian (145 - ? BCE)

== South Asia ==
=== Poets ===
- Approximate time of Tiruvalluvar (300 - 100 BCE), writing in Tamil

=== Works ===
Compilation of the Pathinenmaelkanakku (Eighteen Major Anthology Series) of early Tamil poetry.

== Mediterranean world ==
=== Poets (by date of birth) ===
- Antipater of Sidon
- Lucius Afranius (poet)

=== Works ===
- likely latest date for the Book of Proverbs, written in Hebrew
