= Ambrosius Stub =

Danish poet

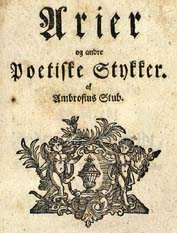
Title page of Stub's collected arias and poems, edited by T. S. Heiberg, 1771

Ambrosius Christoffersen Stub (May 1705 – 15 July 1758) was a Danish poet.

== Life ==
Stub was born in Gummerup on the island of Funen, but his exact birth date is unknown. He was baptized at Verninge in Odense on 17 May 1705. The son of a tailor, he was able to attend the Latin school of Odense (Odense Katedralskole) due to the generosity of noblemen who employed his father. From 1725, he studied theology at the University of Copenhagen. In Copenhagen he developed an interest in opera and music, nurtured by visits of touring opera companies from Italy and Germany. For a living, he worked as a poet and secretary for several noble families. After studying for almost 10 years, he left the university without a degree in 1734, and returned home.

There he met Mette Cathrine Schousboe (1716–1747), a minister's daughter, whom he married in 1735. The couple lived at Mette's inherited farm which they were unable to manage well. As a result, its value soon declined, and the Stubs' living conditions became worse. Of the couple's four children only two survived childhood. In 1747, Stub's wife died aged 31.

Five years later, Ambrosius Stub moved to Ribe, where he kept close company with Bishop Hans Adolph Brorson. Suffering from gout and an alcohol problem, he spent his last years there working as a teacher. He died in Ribe.

== Work ==
Stub wrote his first poems as a 23-year-old student, but during his lifetime, only six of his works were published (in 1752). Most of his work was properly written down, printed and published after his death. Because of this there is still some uncertainty about the correctness of the citations, and it is assumed that he has written more poems than those officially published. A first edition of his collected works was published posthumously in 1771. Later collections were assembled from songbooks, but the attribution of some anonymous poems and arias remains disputed.

Stub's literary works have a wide variety of topics, comprising philosophical and religious poetry as well as drinking songs, love poems and occasional poems.

His Du deylig Rosen-Knop (Thou beautiful rosebud) can be read as a commitment to virtuousness: the withering rose is a symbol for perishable beauty, and only virtue persists.

One of Stub's more famous poems Den kiedsom Winter gik sin Gang (The bleak winter went his way), is found in a truncated version in the anthology Højskolesangbogen. In this poem he describes the beginning of spring from the point of view of a sinister poet. Providence, however, holds more cheerful days for him to come, if he only keeps up his patience and fortitude.

Stub's late work, written in Ribe, is influenced by pietism. Fear of death, Hell and the moral decline of the world become his primary topics of interest.

He was also influenced by the German writer and musician, Johann Sigismund Scholze alias Sperontes. He wrote several religious hymns, like Jeg ser dit kunstværk, store Gud (I see your work of art, oh Lord) and Lyksalig endte da min frelser sine dage (In bliss my saviour ended his days).

== Death ==
Stub died in poverty on 15 July 1758. His body was buried in the cemetery of St. Catherine Priory in Ribe where a bronze monument designed by Per Kirkeby was erected in his memory on a grant by the New Carlsberg Foundation in 2003. It features a square frame in which a stump of a tree is surrounded by the remains of a capital with acanthus leaves, a fragment of a column, two rococo mirrors, and a number of wedges.

== Thou beautiful rosebud (first verse, in translation by John Irons) ==
You rosebud sweet and fair!
Close to, let me inspect you!
Each man must needs respect you,
In you all nature’s art
And splendour dwell apart;
Each petal’s coloured feather
Leaves us uncertain whether
Apparel neat and trim
Says more than splendour’s whim:
A maze where coloured petals –
In paths where each unsettles –
Add fragrance to the air;
You rosebud sweet and fair!

== Works ==
- Ambrosius Stub: Arier og andre poetiske Stykker. Udg. af T.S. Heiberg, København 1771 [2nd ed. 1780]
- Ambrosius Stub: Arier og Sange I-II, 1773
- Ambrosius Stub: Anhang til Ambrosii Stubs Poetiske Tanker, 1782
- Ambrosius Stub: Digte. Udg. med indledning og noter af Erik Kroman [2 vols.], København 1972

== Other sources ==
- Hans Brix: Ambrosius Stub, København 1960
- Helge Stenkilde: Ambrosius Stub. Danmarks første store lyriker. 1705-1758. Herning 2005
- Hanne Marie Svendsen, Werner Svendsen: Geschichte der dänischen Literatur, translated to German by George Goetz, Neumünster 1964, pp. 134–137
- Virpi Zuck (ed.): Dictionary of Scandinavian Literature, Chicago [a.o.] 1990, pp. 588–589
