= Samuel Boyce =

English engraver and poet

Samuel Boyce (died 1775) was an English engraver and poet.

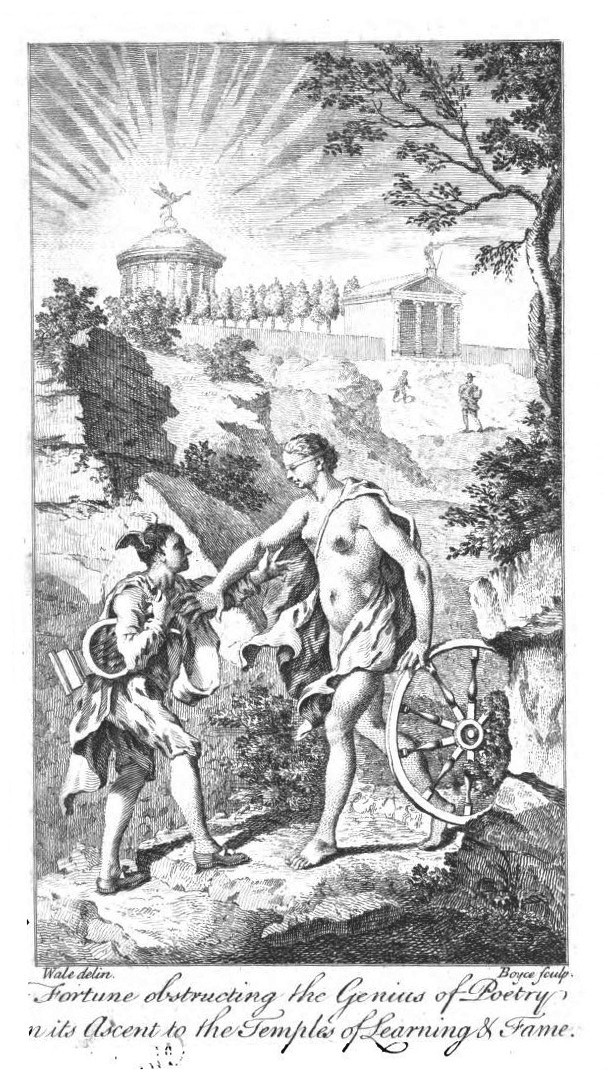
The frontispiece to Boyce's Poems on Several Occasions (1757)

== Life ==
Boyce was originally an engraver, and subsequently worked in the South Sea House. He published one play, entitled The Rover, or Happiness at Last, a dramatic pastoral (1752), which was never performed. In its preface, he claimed that this was due to its length, and not to its lack of merit.

In 1757, he published Poems on Several Occasions, which included an ode entitled Glory, addressed to the Duke of Cumberland, and a heroic poem in two cantos, dedicated to actor David Garrick, called Paris, or the Force of Beauty. The frontispiece, engraved by Boyce himself, was an allegorical scene depicting "Fortune obstructing the Genius of Poetry in its ascent to the Temples of Learning and Fame".

He was a friend of Christopher Smart, and published a poem in praise of Smart's Song to David in the Public Advertiser in July 1763.

He died 21 March 1775.

== Works ==
- The Rover, or Happiness at Last, a dramatic pastoral (1752)
- An Ode to the Right Hon. the marquis of Harrington, Lord Lieutenant of Ireland (1755)
- Paris, or the force of Beauty; a poem in two cantos (1755)
- Poems on several Occasions (London 1757)
- New Song on the Arrival of the Cherokee King and His Chiefs The poem was probably written in to mark a visit arranged by Henry Timberlake in 1764.
