= 1703 in poetry =

Nationality words link to articles with information on the nation's poetry or literature (for instance, Irish or France).

== Works published ==
- Lady Mary Chudleigh, Poems upon Several Occasions
- William Congreve, A Hymn to Harmony
- Daniel Defoe:
  - A true collection of the writings of the author of the True Born English-man
  - A Hymn to the Funeral Sermon, published anonymously, has been attributed to Defoe
  - More Reformation: A satyr upon himself
- Sarah Fyge Egerton, Poems on Several Occasions, prefatory verses by Susanna Centlivre
- Bernard Mandeville, Some Fables After the Easie and Familiar Method of Monsieur de la Fontaine, published anonymously

== Births ==
Death years link to the corresponding "[year] in poetry" article:

- March 5 (n. s.) – Vasily Kirillovich Trediakovsky (died 1768), Russian poet
- June 28 (n.s.) – John Wesley (died 1791), English cleric and Christian theologian, founder of Methodism, psalmist and hymnist
- October 2 – Fukuda Chiyo-ni, or Kaga no Chiyo, 千代尼 (died 1775), Japanese poet of the Edo period and a prominent haiku poet (a woman)
- Date unknown – Gilbert West (died 1756), English poet and translator
- Approximate date
  - Samuel Boyse (died 1749), Irish poet
  - Henry Brooke (died 1783), Irish poet, novelist and dramatist

== Deaths ==
Birth years link to the corresponding "[year] in poetry" article:

- October 14 - Thomas Kingo (born 1634), Danish bishop, poet and hymn-writer

== See also ==
- Poetry
- List of years in poetry
- List of years in literature
- 18th century in poetry
- 18th century in literature

== Notes ==
- "A Timeline of English Poetry" Web page of the Representative Poetry Online Web site, University of Toronto
