= Giovanni Antonio Galignani =

Giovanni Antonio Galignani (1757–1821) was an Italian newspaper publisher born at Brescia.

After living some time in London, he moved to Paris, where in 1800 he started an English library, and in 1808 a monthly publication, the Repertory of English Literature. In 1814 he began to publish the Galignani's Messenger, a daily paper printed in English.

After his death in 1821, his two sons, John Anthony (1796–1873) and William (1798–1882) continued publishing the paper. Under their management it enjoyed a high reputation for its global coverage and emphasis on progressive news. Its stated policy was to promote goodwill between England and France. The brothers' goodwill was not simply rhetoric. They expanded their prestige by establishing and endowing hospitals at Corbeil and at Neuilly-sur-Seine. In recognition of their generosity, the city of Corbeil erected a monument in their honour.

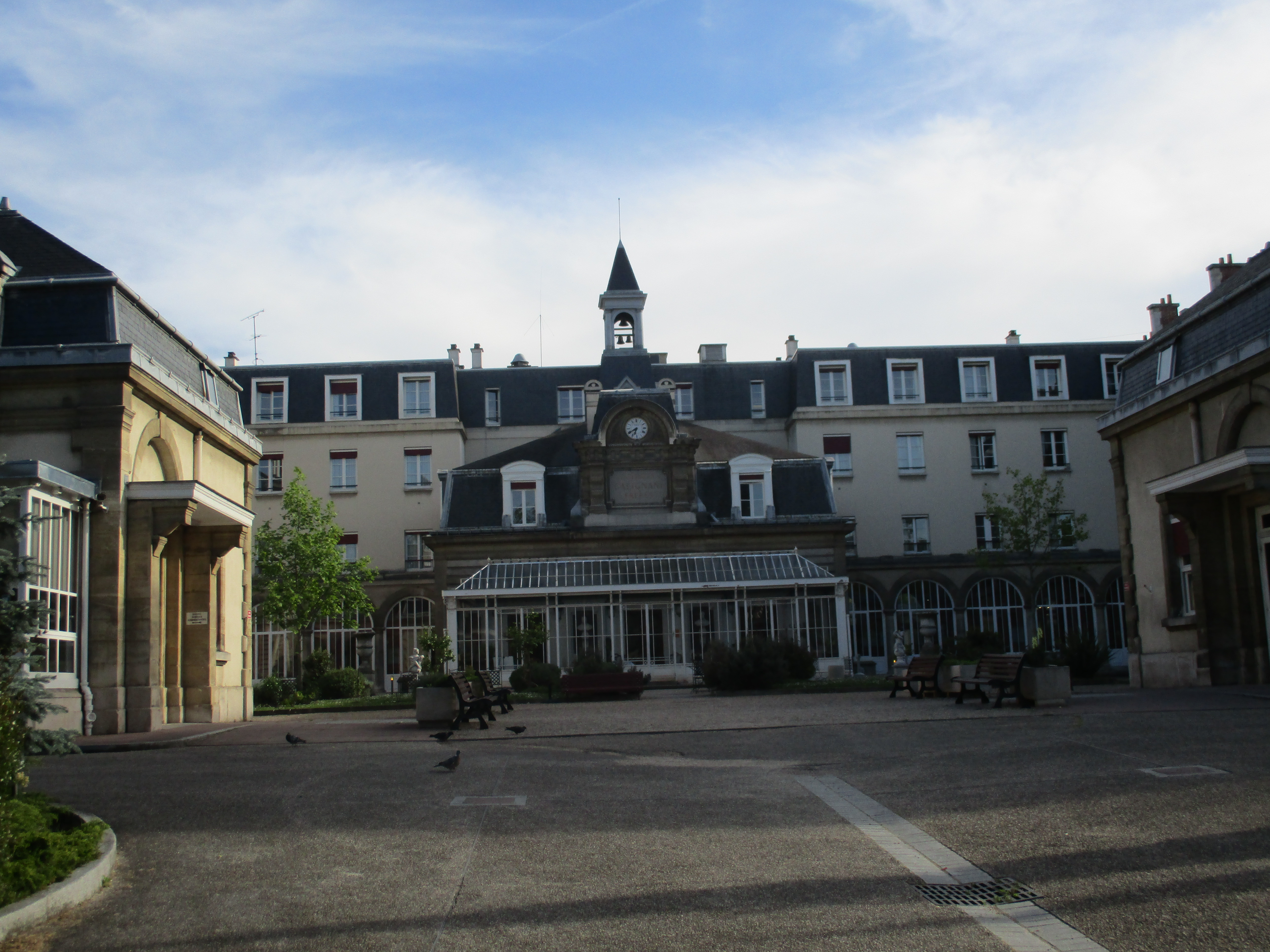
Galignani residence in Neuilly-sur-Seine

In 1884 the Galignani family disposed of their interest in Galignani's Messenger. Since then until it was finally discontinued in 1904, the paper appeared under the title of the Daily Messenger.

Galignani's Messenger is referred to in Turgenev's novel Fathers and Sons, as well as in author William Makepeace Thackeray‘s victorian novel Vanity Fair, where the paper appears as "the exile's best friend". Also mentioned in George du Maurier's "Trilby". It is also mentioned in the Diary of Maria Bashkirtseff. It is also visited by the main character of J.K. Huysmans' novel À rebours.

The account book of Eng and Chang Bunker, The Original Siamese Twins - on page 120 references "Advertising in Gulignani's Messenger from 4 Jan to 28 Feb" on page 120 in 1836.

There are also references to 'Galignani's' in Trollope's Last Chronicle Of Barset, and Stevenson’s and Osbourne’s The Wrong Box.

== Sources ==
- Barber, Giles: "Galignani's and the Publication of English Books in France from 1800 to 1852", Library s5-XVI (1961), p. 267–286
