= 1695 in poetry =

Nationality words link to articles with information on the nation's poetry or literature (for instance, Irish or France).

== Works ==
=== Great Britain ===
- Joseph Addison, A Poem to His Majesty
- Sir Richard Blackmore, Prince Arthur
- Colley Cibber, A Poem on the Death of Our Late Sovereign Lady, Queen Mary, on the death of Mary II
- John Dennis, The Court of Death, on the death of Mary II; the preface contains a discussion on the genre of the ode, Dennis' longest
- John Dryden, "Parallel of Poetry and Painting", criticism; an essay prefacing Dryden's translation of Du Fresnoy's De Arte Graphica
- John Milton, The Poetical Works of Mr. John Milton, edited by Patrick Hume and published by Jacob Tonson, who had bought the rights to the work, this was the first annotated edition of Paradise Lost.
- Matthew Prior, An English Ballad: In answer to Mr. Despreaux's Pindaresque ode on the taking of Namure, "Despreaux" refers to Nicholas Boileau-Despreaux; in this edition the text of Despreaux's Ode sur la prise de Namur was given in French on pages opposite Prior's verse; published anonymously by Jacob Tonson. Prior's friend, Sir William Trumbull, wrote to him, "I see no reason why the author should be ashamed of battering Boileau's poem and reducing it, any more than we the castle, since it is our honour that everything that concerns Namur be on our side." Samuel Johnson would later write about this work: "The burlesque of Boileau's Ode on Namur has, in some parts, such airiness and levity as will always procure it readers, even among those who cannot compare it with the original."
- Richard Steele, printed anonymously with author identified as "a gentleman of the army", The Procession: A poem on Her Majesties funeral
- Edward Ward, Female Policy Detected; or, The Arts of a Designing Woman Laid Open

=== Other languages ===
- Giuseppe Berneri, Meo Patacca or Roma in feste ne i Trionfi di Vienna ("Rome in jubilation for the Triumphs of Vienna"), Italy

== Births ==
Death years link to the corresponding "[year] in poetry" article:

- April 8 – Johann Christian Günther (died 1723), German
- August 1 – Thomas Purney (died 1730), English clergyman and poet
- Also – Thomas Fitzgerald (died 1752), English

== Deaths ==
Birth years link to the corresponding "[year] in poetry" article:

- April 5 – George Savile, 1st Marquess of Halifax (born 1633), English statesman, writer and politician
- April 13 – Jean de la Fontaine (born 1621), French poet and fable writer
- April 17 – Juana Inés de la Cruz (born 1651), self-taught Novohispanic scholar, nun, poet and writer
- April 23 – Henry Vaughan (born 1621), Welsh metaphysical poet and physician
- Also – Vaman Pandit (born 1608), Indian Marathi scholar and poet

== See also ==
- List of years in poetry
- List of years in literature
- 17th century in poetry
- 17th century in literature
- Poetry
