= Cornelius Arnold =

English poet (1711–1757?)

Cornelius Arnold (1711-1757?), was a poetical writer.

Arnold was born 13 March 1711, and entered Merchant Taylors' School in 1723. The statement that he became one of the ushers in the school is incorrect. In the latter part of his life he was beadle to the Worshipful Company of Distillers.

His works are:

- 'Distress, a poetical essay,' dedicated to John Robartes, 4th Earl of Radnor, London [1750?], 4to.
- 'Commerce, a poem,' 2nd edit. London, 1751, 4to.
- 'The Mirror. A Poetical Essay in the manner of Spenser,' dedicated to David Garrick, London, 1755, 4to.
- 'Osman,' a tragedy. In a volume of poems published in 1757.
