= Leonard Howard =

British priest

Leonard Howard (1699?–1767) was an English clergyman and writer.

== Life ==
Born about 1699, He was originally a clerk in the post office. He took orders, was M.A. probably of some Scottish university, and D.D. by 1745. In 1742 he was curate of the parishes of St John, Southwark, and St Botolph, Aldersgate, and chaplain to Frederick, Prince of Wales. Three years later he had become vicar of either Bishop's Tawton or South Tawton, Devon, and lecturer of St Magnus, London Bridge, and of St James, Garlick Hythe.

On 18 July 1749 he was presented by the crown to the rectory of St George the Martyr, Southwark, which he held with the lectureships of St Magnus and of St Margaret, Fish Street. He subsequently was appointed chaplain to Augusta of Saxe-Gotha, the Princess Dowager of Wales. He died on 21 December 1767, aged 68, and was buried underneath the communion-table in St. George's Church. Howard was a popular preacher, but money troubles frequently led to his imprisonment in the King's Bench Prison, where he was dubbed "poet laureate", and he sometimes obtained money as subscriptions to books which he pretended to be writing.

== Works ==
In 1728 he published some 'Verses on the Recovery of the Lord Townshend, humbly inscribed to … Sir Robert Walpole,' with a poem on William III (Craftsman, 15 June 1728). Howard's best known work is A Collection of Letters from the original Manuscripts of many Princes, great Personages and Statesmen. Together with some curious and scarce Tracts and Pieces of Antiquity, London, 1753. A second volume, which was announced to be in preparation, did not appear. Another edition was in two volumes, with Memoirs of the unfortunate Prince Anthony the First of Portugal, and the Oeconomy of High-Life, London, 1756.

Besides sermons, Howard also published:

- 'The Newest Manual of Private Devotions. In three parts,' London, 1745 (1753, 1760).
- 'The Royal Bible; or a complete Body of Christian Divinity: containing the Holy Scriptures at large, and a full … explanation of all the difficult texts … together with critical notes and observations on the whole,' London, 1761.
- 'The Book of Common Prayer … illustrated and explained by a full … paraphrase,' London, 1761.
- 'Miscellaneous Pieces in prose and verse … to which are added The Letters, &c. of … Henry Hatsell, Esq., deceased; and several Tracts, Poems, &c. of some eminent personages of wit and humour,' London, 1765.

He also revised a Layman's 'New Companion for the Festivals and Fasts of the Church of England,' London, 1761. Howard's literary thefts exposed him tocriticism, to which he refers in the prefaces to his 'Newest Manual' and 'Collection of Letters.'
