= William Thompson (poet, born circa 1712) =

18th-century poet from England

William Thompson (c. 1712 – c. 1766) was an 18th-century English poet and Anglican priest.

== Life ==
William Thompson was the son of Rev. Francis Thompson, vicar of Brough in Westmoreland, NW England, who died in 1735; William's date of birth is not known. William Thompson studied at Queen's College, Oxford, which his father had also attended, and graduated with a Master of Arts in 1738, afterwards becoming a fellow of the college.

Thompson became rector of Hampton Poyle with South Weston in Oxfordshire. He published his collected poems in two volumes in 1757.

== Work ==
He is best known for the long poem Sickness (1746), which discusses various illnesses including melancholy, fever, consumption, and variola. Other poems include Epithalamium, Nativity, and Hymn to May, as well as a panegyric to Alexander Pope.
