= 1804 in poetry =

Nationality words link to articles with information on the nation's poetry or literature (for instance, Irish or France).

== Events ==
- William Wordsworth writes "I Wandered Lonely as a Cloud", inspired by an incident on April 15, 1802, in which Wordsworth and his sister, Dorothy, came across a "long belt" of daffodils. The poem will be first published in 1807 and published in revised form in 1815. It is titled "The Daffodils" in some anthologies.

== Works published ==
=== United Kingdom ===
- William Blake
  - Milton (including "And did those feet in ancient time") (see 1808 in poetry)
  - Jerusalem: The Emanation of the Giant Albion (publication concluded 1820)
- Robert Bloomfield, Good Tidings; or, News from the Farm
- William Lisle Bowles, The Spirit of Discovery; or, The Conquest of the Ocean
- Thomas Brown, Poems
- John Galt, The Battle of Largs, published anonymously; the author's first published work
- James Grahame, The Sabbath, published anonymously
- Thomas Love Peacock, The Monks of St. Mark, published anonymously
- Ann Taylor and Jane Taylor, Original Poems for Infant Minds

=== United States ===
- Thomas Green Fessenden, Original Poems, collected from the author's submissions to newspapers, mostly literary and anti-Jacobin satires; the book is popular, especially one poem in it, "The Country Lovers"
- David Humphreys, The Miscellaneous Works of David Humphreys, Late Minister Plenipotentiary from the United States of America to the Court of Madrid, New York: T. and J. Swords
- Susanna Haswell Rowson, Miscellaneous Poems; by Susanna Rowson, Preceptress of The Ladies' Academy, Newton, Mass., Boston: Gilbert and Dean; the author's second and final collection, including songs set to music and longer patriotic pieces; a popular volume which never received critical approval
- year uncertain – John Williams, published under the pen name "Anthony Pasquin", The Hamiltoniad: or, An extinguisher for the royal faction of New-England. With copious notes, illustrative, biographical, philosophical, critical, admonitory, and political; being intended as a high-heeled shoe for all limping republicans, Boston, Massachusetts: "Sold for the Author at The Independent Chronicle Office" Irish-born poet at this time living in the United States; a harsh satire attacking Alexander Hamilton and the Federalistrs; divided into three cantos, with extensive footnotes, including French and Latin quotations and snippets of correspondence between Hamilton and Aaron Burr

== Births ==
Death years link to the corresponding "[year] in poetry" article:

- January 21 – Eliza R. Snow (died 1887), American
- February 1 – Handrij Zejler (died 1872), Sorbian
- May 15 – Samuel Laman Blanchard (died 1845), English author, poet and journalist
- September 4 – Charles Whitehead (died 1862), English poet, novelist and dramatist
- December 31 – Francis Sylvester Mahony, also known as "Father Prout" (died 1866), Irish humorist and poet
- Chō Kōran (died 1879), Japanese poet and nanga artist

== Deaths ==
Birth years link to the corresponding "[year] in poetry" article:

- January 4 – Charlotte Lennox (born c. 1730), British author, playwright and poet associated with Samuel Johnson, Joshua Reynolds, and Samuel Richardson
- January 24 – Joseph Fawcett (born c. 1758), English Presbyterian minister and poet
- November 23 – Richard Graves (born 1715) English poet and novelist
- December 16 – Christian Felix Weiße (born 1726), German
- Also:
  - John Blair Linn (born 1777), American
  - Johann Franz von Palthen (born 1724), German

== See also ==
- Poetry
- List of years in poetry
- List of years in literature
- 19th century in literature
- 19th century in poetry
- Romantic poetry
- Golden Age of Russian Poetry (1800–1850)
- Weimar Classicism period in Germany, commonly considered to have begun in 1788 and to have ended either in 1805, with the death of Friedrich Schiller, or 1832, with the death of Goethe
- List of poets

== Notes ==
- "A Timeline of English Poetry" Web page of the Representative Poetry Online Web site, University of Toronto
