= 1759 in literature =

This article contains information about the literary events and publications of 1759.

== Events ==
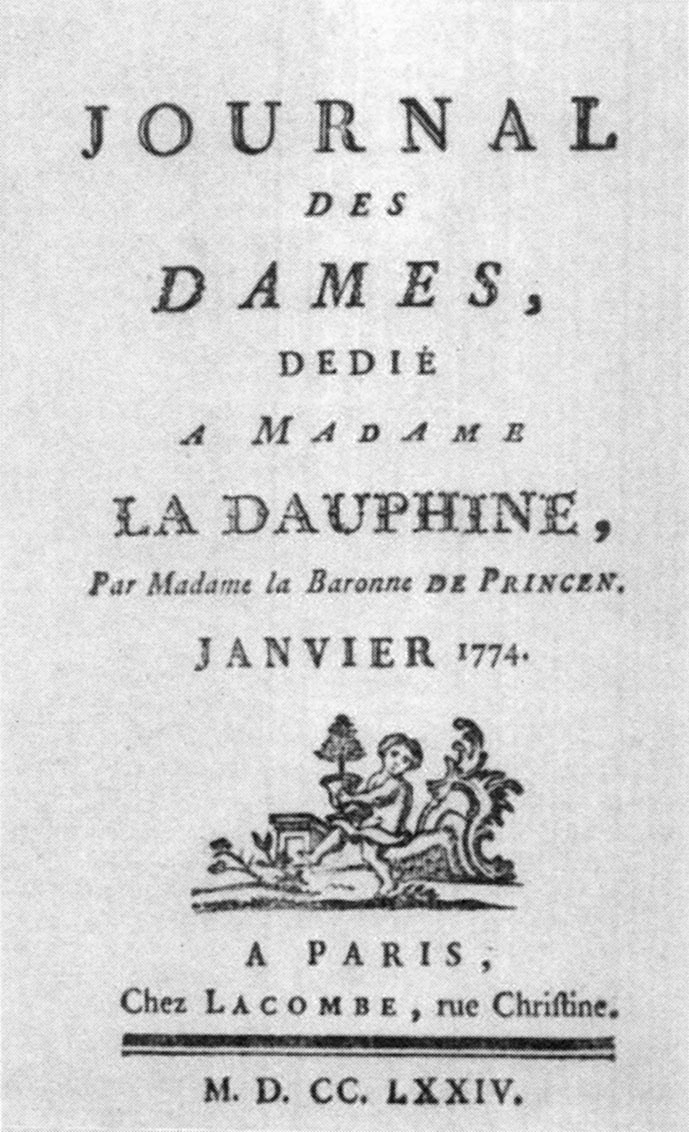
Journal des Dames, Paris, January 1774.

- January – Journal des Dames starts its publication in France. This French women's magazine would continue being published until 1778. It was a pioneering magazine as one of the first women's magazines, as well as one of the first fashion magazines in both France and in the continent of Europe.
- By January 15 – Voltaire's satirical novella Candide, ou l'Optimisme is published simultaneously in five countries.
- January 15 – The British Museum opens in London.
- March 5 – Denis Diderot's Encyclopédie is proscribed by the Vatican and (on March 8) temporarily suppressed by the French government. The ban is lifted in September to allow publication of a revised version.
- July 27 – The earliest known professional performance of Shakespeare's Hamlet in North America (in Garrick's version) is given by the American Company in Philadelphia, with Lewis Hallam Jr. as Hamlet.
- August 12 – In the Seven Years' War Battle of Kunersdorf, the German poet Major Ewald Christian von Kleist is fatally injured.
- December – Laurence Sterne has the first two volumes of his comic metafictional novel The Life and Opinions of Tristram Shandy, Gentleman printed in a small run at his own expense in York, in a shop owned by Ann Ward, dated 1760 and with London publisher Robert Dodsley as distributor.
- December 22 – The writer and critic William Warburton is nominated Anglican Bishop of Gloucester.
- unknown dates
  - Rev. Hugh Blair begins to teach a course on the principles of literary composition at the University of Edinburgh, the first held in the field of English literature.
  - Johann Ernst Immanuel Walch becomes a professor of rhetoric and poetry at the University of Jena.

== New books ==
=== Fiction ===
- Anonymous – The History of Some of the Penitents in the Magdalen-House (dated 1760)
- Sarah Fielding – The History of the Countess of Dellwyn
- Samuel Johnson – The History of Rasselas, Prince of Abissinia (on Wikisource).
- Gotthold Lessing – Fables
- Madame Riccoboni – Lettres de Milady Juliette Catesby
- William Rider – Candidus (translation of Candide)
- Laurence Sterne – The Life and Opinions of Tristram Shandy, Gentleman, vols 1–2
- Voltaire – Candide

=== Drama ===
- William Hawkins – Cymbeline (adapted from William Shakespeare)
- Arthur Murphy – The Orphan of China
- James Townley – High Life Below Stairs

=== Poetry ===
- Samuel Butler – The Genuine Remains (collected works)
- Edward Capell – Prolusions
- John Gilbert Cooper – Ver-Vert (transl.)
- William Mason – Caractacus
- Augustus Montague Toplady – Poems on Sacred Subjects

=== Non-fiction ===
- Franz Aepinus – Tentamen Theoriae Electricitatis et Magnetismi (An Attempt at a Theory of Electricity and Magnetism)
- Edmund Burke – The Annual Register
- Angélique du Coudray – Abrégé de l'art des accouchements (The Art of Obstetrics)
- Alexander Gerard – An Essay on Taste
- Oliver Goldsmith
  - The Bee (periodical solely by Goldsmith)
  - An Enquiry into the Present State of Polite Learning in Europe
- David Hume – The History of England, Under the House of Tudor
- Richard Hurd – Moral and Political Dialogues
- Edward Hyde, 1st Earl of Clarendon – The Life of Edward Earl of Clarendon Written by Himself
- Rai Chatar Man Kayath – Chahar Gulshan
- William Robertson – The History of Scotland during the Reigns of Queen Mary and of King James
- Adam Smith – The Theory of Moral Sentiments
- Arthur Young – Reflections on the Present State of Affairs at Home and Abroad
- Edward Young – Conjectures on Original Composition

== Births ==
- January 25 – Robert Burns, Scottish poet writing in Braid Scots and English (died 1796)
- March 5 – John Jamieson, Scottish lexicographer (died 1838)
- March 29 – Alexander Chalmers, Scottish biographer and editor (died 1834)
- April 27 – Mary Wollstonecraft, English political writer and advocate of women's rights (died 1797)
- May 4 (baptism) – Isabella Kelly, Scottish novelist and poet (died 1857)
- June 17 – Helen Maria Williams, English novelist, poet and translator from French (died 1827)
- October 13 – Mary Hays, English writer and advocate of women's rights (died 1843)
- November 10 – Friedrich Schiller, German poet and dramatist (died 1805)
- December 25 – Richard Porson, English classicist (died 1808)
- unknown date – Deen Mahomet, author of first book in English by an Indian (died 1851)

== Deaths ==
- June 12 – William Collins, English poet (born 1721)
- June 26 – Arthur Young, English religious writer and cleric (born 1693)
- July 27 – Pierre Louis Maupertuis, French philosopher (born 1698)
- July 29 – Kata Bethlen, Hungarian memoirist and correspondent (born 1700)
- August 16 – Eugene Aram, English philologist and murderer, hanged (born 1704)
- August 24 – Ewald Christian von Kleist, German poet (born 1715)
- September 5 – Lauritz de Thurah, Danish architectural historian (born 1706)
- October 7 – Joseph Ames, English bibliographer and antiquary (born 1680)
- unknown date – Francis Coventry, English clergyman and novelist (born 1725)
- probable – Anton Wilhelm Amo, West African-born German philosopher (born 1703)
