= 1690 in poetry =

This article covers 1690 in poetry. Nationality words link to articles with information on the nation's poetry or literature (for instance, Irish or France).

== Works published ==
- Thomas Brown, The Late Converts Exposed, published anonymously (see The Reasons of Mr Bays Changing his Religion 1688)
- Thomas D'Urfey:
  - Collin's Walk Through London and Westminster
  - New Poems
- John Glanvill, Some Odes of Horace Imitated with Relation to his Majesty and the Times
- Charles Montagu, Earl of Halifax, An Epistle to the Right Honourable Charles Earl of Dorset and Middlesex, published anonymously, on William II of England's victories in Ireland
- Edmund Waller, The Maid's Tragedy Altered, a fragment, possibly intended by Waller to turn Beaumont and Fletcher's The Maides Tragedy [1619] into a comedy; with other poems
- Edward Ward, The School of Politicks; or, The Humours of a Coffee-House, anonymous

== Births ==
Death years link to the corresponding "[year] in poetry" article:

- January 1 – Christian Falster (died 1752), Dutch poet and philologist
- 1689/90 – Susanna Highmore (died 1750), English poet

== Deaths ==
Birth years link to the corresponding "[year] in poetry" article:

- Peter Folger (born 1617), English-born American poet and maternal grandfather of Benjamin Franklin
- Keshav Pandit (born unknown), Shivaji's religious chief, Sanskrit scholar and poet
- Franciscus Plante (born 1613), Dutch poet and chaplain
- Wang Wu (born 1632), Chinese painter and poet

== See also ==
- Poetry
- 17th century in poetry
- 17th century in literature
