= 1773 in poetry =

Nationality words link to articles with information on the nation's poetry or literature (for instance, Irish or France).

== Events ==
- May 4 – Eibhlín Dubh Ní Chonaill composes the keen Caoineadh Airt Uí Laoghaire over the body of her husband Art Ó Laoghaire.
- Cláudio Manuel da Costa writes his epic poem Vila Rica, relating the history of the homonymous Brazilian city, modern-day Ouro Preto; it is not published until 1839.
- Friedrich Gottlieb Klopstock publishes the last five cantos of his epic poem Der Messias in Hamburg.
- William Cowper, living at Olney, Buckinghamshire, experiences mental disturbances, believing himself condemned to damnation.

== Works published ==
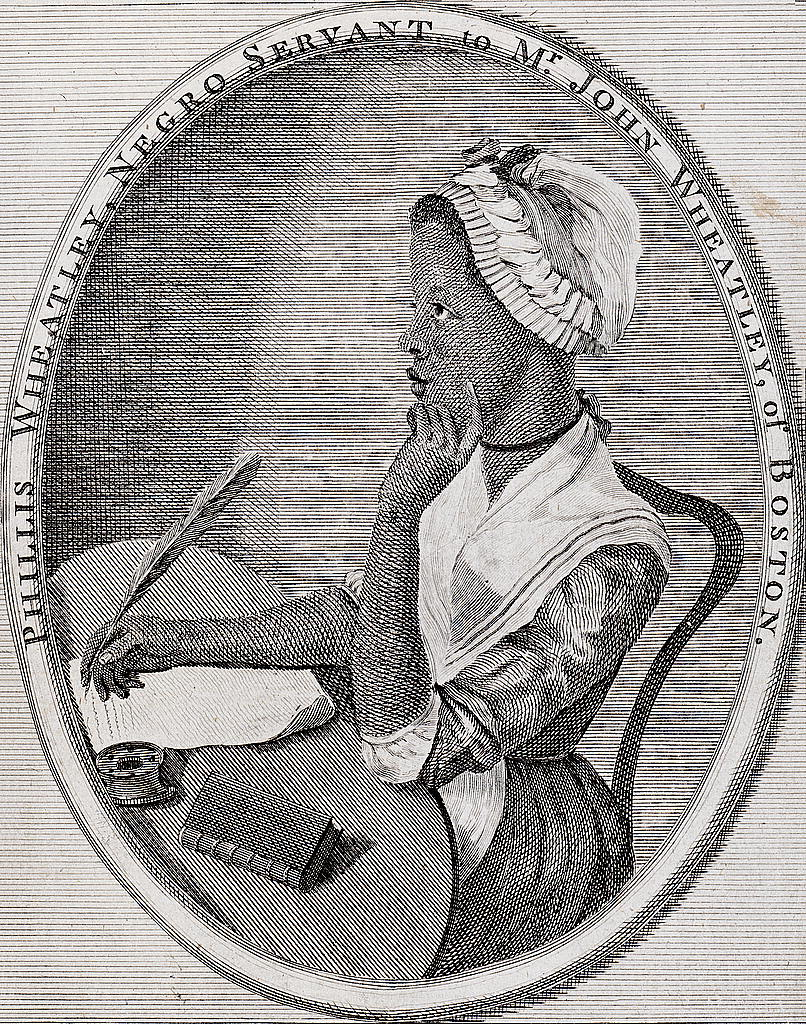
Phillis Wheatley, as illustrated by Scipio Moorhead in the frontispiece to her book Poems on Various Subjects.

- Anna Laetitia Barbauld, Poems
- Thomas Day, The Dying Negro, Occasioned by the incident, as described in the advertisement published with the poem, about "A black who, a few days before, had run away from his master, and got himself christened, with intent to marry a white woman, his fellow-servant, being taken and sent on board a ship in the Thames, took an opportunity of shooting himself through the head"; a very popular poem, one of the earliest anti-slavery works of literature in Britain, with co-author John Bicknell
- Johannes Ewald, Rungsteds Lyksaligheder
- Robert Fergusson:
  - Auld Reikie
  - Poems (see also Poems on Various Subjects 1779)
- Richard Graves, The Love of Order, published anonymously
- Edward Jerningham, Faldoni and Teresa
- George Keate, The Monument in Arcadia
- James Macpherson, translator, The Iliad, from the original Ancient Greek of Homer's Iliad
- William Mason, An Heroic Epistle o Sir William Chambers
- Samuel Mather, "The Sacred Minister", English, Colonial America
- Hannah More, A Search after Happiness, "by a young lady"
- Thomas Scott (of Ipswich), Lyric Poems, Devotional and Moral, the book includes most of the author's poems
- Phillis Wheatley, Poems on Various Subjects, Religious and Moral, the first book of poetry by an American slave, including "On Being Brought from Africa to America". The book was published in Aldgate, London because publishers in Boston, Massachusetts, had refused to publish the text. Wheatley and her master's son, Nathanial Wheatley, went to London, where Selina, Countess of Huntingdon and the Earl of Dartmouth helped with the publication.
- John Wolcot, Persian Love Elegies

== Births ==
Death years link to the corresponding "[year] in poetry" article:

- May 31 – Ludwig Tieck (died 1853), German poet, translator, editor, novelist and critic
- August 21 – Jens Christian Djurhuus (died 1853), Faroese poet
- December 9 – Robert Treat Paine Jr. (died 1811), American poet and editor (son of Robert Treat Paine, signer of the Declaration of Independence)
- Joseph Harris (Gomer) (died 1825), Welsh Baptist minister, poet, writer and editor

== Deaths ==
Birth years link to the corresponding "[year] in poetry" article:

- March 5 – Philip Francis (born 1708), Irish-born English translator of the works of Horace, poet, playwright and clergyman
- March 24 – Philip Stanhope, 4th Earl of Chesterfield (Lord Chesterfield) (born 1694) English statesman and man of letters
- August 3 – Stanisław Konarski (actual name: Hieronim Konarski) (born 1700), Polish pedagogue, educational reformer, political writer, poet, dramatist, Piarist friar and precursor of the Polish Enlightenment
- August 24 – George Lyttelton, 1st Baron Lyttelton (born 1709), English statesman, patron of the arts and poet
- September 18 – John Cunningham (born 1729), Irish-born poet, dramatist and actor, working in Newcastle upon Tyne (England)
- November 7 – Andrew Brice (born 1690), English printer and writer
- November 16 – John Hawkesworth (born c. 1715), English editor and poet

== See also ==
- List of years in poetry
- List of years in literature
- 18th century in poetry
- 18th century in literature
- French literature of the 18th century
- Sturm und Drang (the conventional translation is "Storm and Stress"; a more literal translation, however, might be "storm and urge", "storm and longing", "storm and drive" or "storm and impulse"), a movement in German literature (including poetry) and music from the late 1760s through the early 1780s
- List of years in poetry
- Poetry
