= 1752 in poetry =

Nationality words link to articles with information on the nation's poetry or literature (for instance, Irish or France).

== Events ==
- Christopher Smart wins the Seatonian Prize for the third time (he won the same prize in 1750 and 1751, and he will win it again in 1753 and 1755).

== Works published ==
=== Great Britain ===
- Moses Browne, The Works and Rest of the Creation
- John Byrom, Enthusiasm: A poetical essay
- Richard Owen Cambridge, A Dialogue Between a Member of Parliament and His Servant
- Thomas Cooke, Pythagoras: An ode, published anonymously
- Samuel Davies, Miscellaneous Poems, Chiefly on Divine Subjects, previously published in the Virginia Gazette; English Colonial America
- William Mason, Elfrida: A dramatic poem
- Christopher Smart, Poems on Several Occasions (Some criticism of the work by Sir John Hill (1716-1775) later caused Smart to write The Hilliad, a satire on Hill in 1753)
- James Sterling, An Epistle to the Hon. Arthur Dobbs, a verse epistle addressed to a projector who sought the Northwest Passage; the neoclassical-style poem asserts that Britain's future will depend on America; English Colonial America

=== Other ===
- Christoph Martin Wieland, Germany:
  - Spring
  - Moral Letters in Verse, 12 letters
  - Art of Love

== Births ==
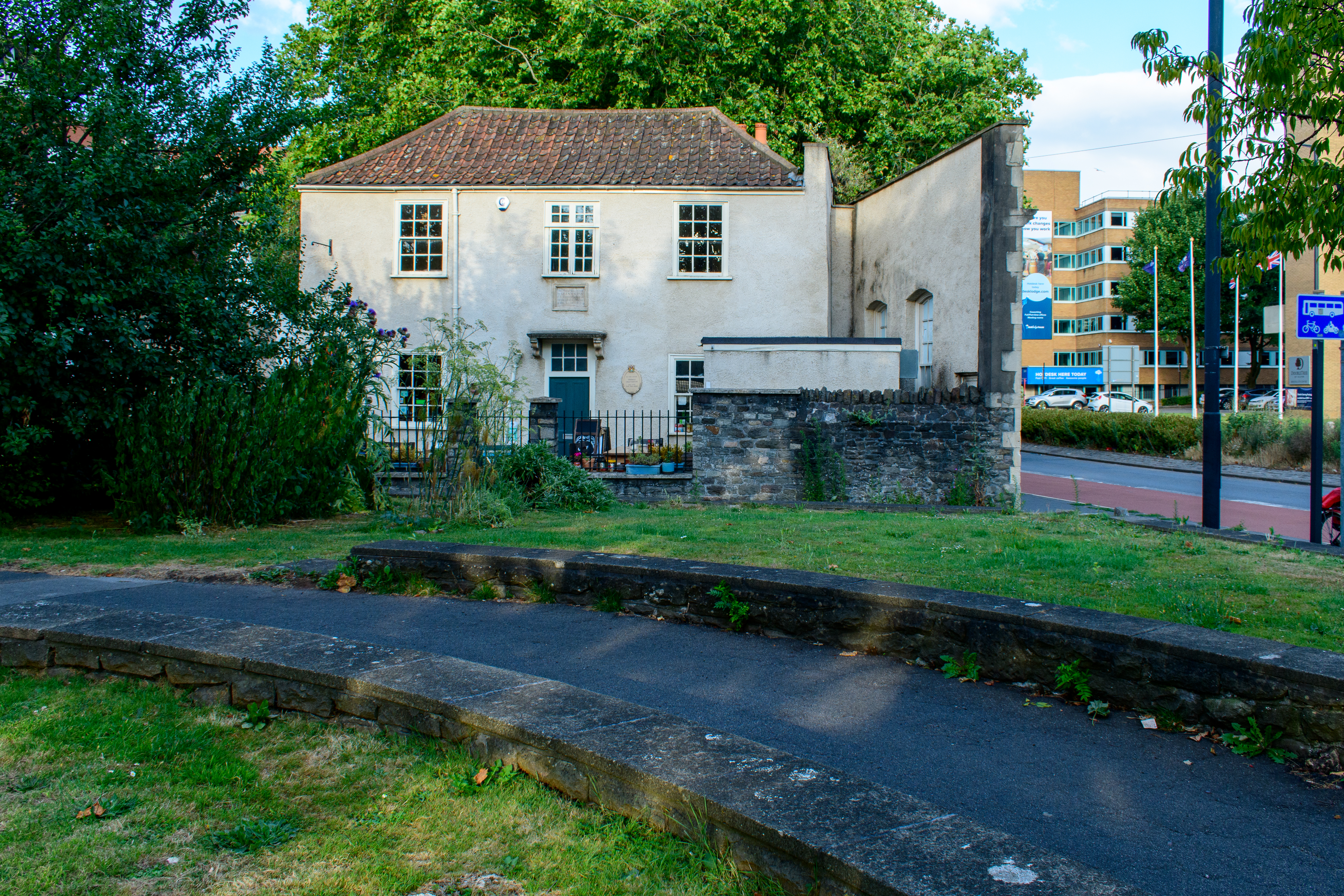
Thomas Chatterton's birthplace in Bristol

Death years link to the corresponding "[year] in poetry" article:

- January 2 – Philip Freneau (died 1832), American "poet of the American Revolution"
- May 14 – Timothy Dwight IV (died 1817), American academic and educator, eighth president of Yale College, Congregationalist minister, theologian, author and poet
- July 10 – St. George Tucker (died 1827), American lawyer and professor of law at the College of William and Mary
- October 2 – Joseph Ritson (died 1803), English writer and antiquary
- November 20 – Thomas Chatterton (suicide 1770), English poet and literary forger
- November 23 – Ann Eliza Bleecker (died 1783), American poet and correspondent
- Unknown date – Richard Llwyd (died 1835), Welsh poet and writer
- Approximate date – Edmund Gardner (died 1798), English poet

== Deaths ==
Birth years link to the corresponding "[year] in poetry" article:

- January 1 – Shah Abdul Latif Bhittai (born 1689), Sufi scholar and saint, poet of the Sindhi language
- October 24 – Christian Falster (born 1690), Danish poet and philologist
- Li E (born 1692), Chinese poet

== See also ==
- 18th century in poetry
- Augustan literature
- Augustan poetry
- List of years in poetry
- Paper War of 1752–1753
- Poetry
