= 1770 in poetry =

Long as in Freedom's Cause the wise contend,
Dear to your unity shall Fame extend;
While to the World, the letter's Stone shall tell,
How Caldwell, Attucks, Gray and Mav'rick fell.

"On the Affray in King Street, on the Evening of the 5th of March, 1770", about the Boston Massacre

— Phillis Wheatley

Nationality words link to articles with information on the nation's poetry or literature (for instance, Irish or France).

== Works published ==
=== Colonial America ===
- William Billings, The New England Psalm-Singer
- William Livingsotn:
  - "A Soliloquy"
  - "America: or, A Poem on the Settlement of the British Colonies"
- John Trumbull, "An Essay on the Uses and Advantages of the Fine Arts"
- Phillis Wheatley:
  - "On the Affray in King Street, on the Evening of the 5th of March, 1770" about the Boston Massacre which had taken place near Wheatley's home
  - an elegy to George Whitefield that received widespread acclaim. It was published within weeks of his death as a broadside in Boston, then in Newport, Rhode Island, then four more times in Boston and a dozen more times in New York, Philadelphia and Newport. It was published in London in 1771.

=== United Kingdom ===
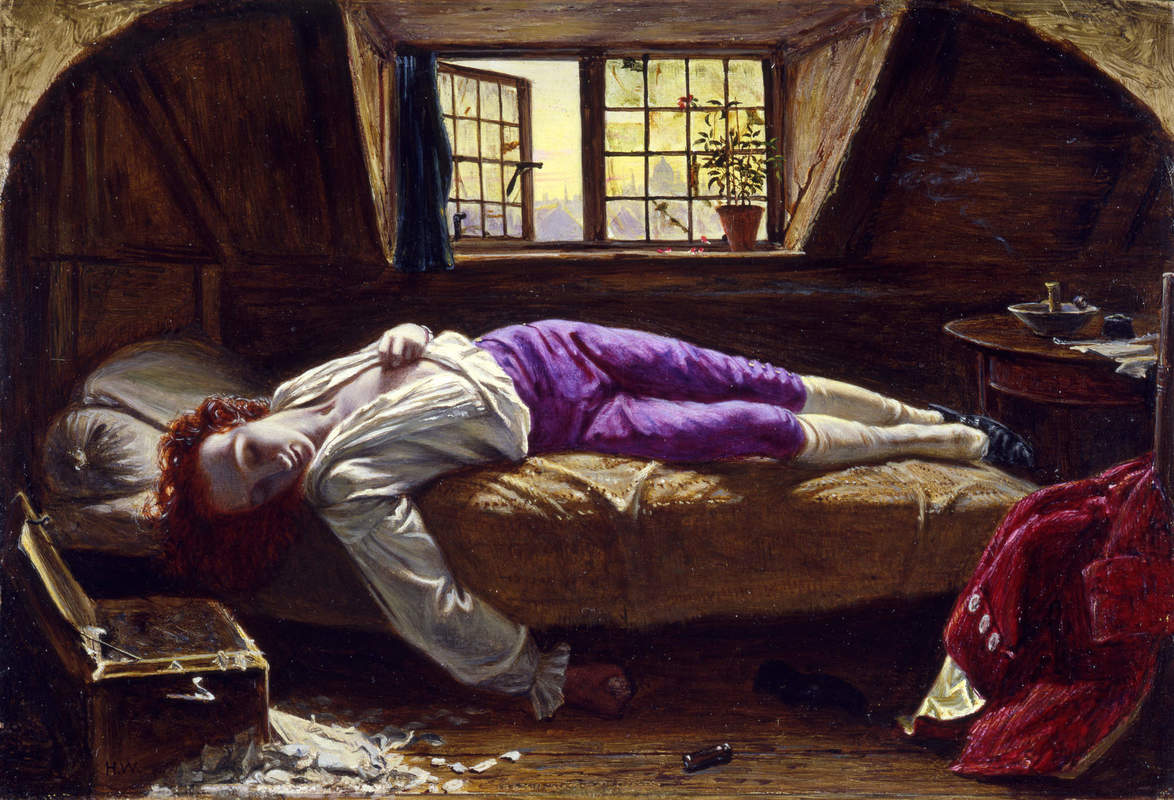
The Death of Chatterton, 1856, by Henry Wallis, the most famous image of Thomas Chatterton in the 19th century. The English poet and forger committed suicide on August 24, at the age of 17. (The figure of the poet was modelled by the young George Meredith)

- John Armstrong, Miscellanies, poetry and prose by a physician writer
- Michael Bruce, Poems on Several Occasions
- Sir David Dalrymple, Lord Hailes, editor, Ancient Scottish Poems, an anthology
- Oliver Goldsmith, The Deserted Village, published in May
- Thomas Warton, Inquiry into the Authenticity of the Rowley Poems, criticism
- William Woty, Poetical Works

=== Other ===
- Martin Wieland, Graces, Germany
- Voltaire, Épître à l'Auteur du Livre des Trois Imposteurs ("Letter to the author of The Three Impostors"); France

== Births ==
Death years link to the corresponding "[year] in poetry" article:

- February 1 – Robert Anderson (died 1833), English Cumbrian dialect poet
- March 20 – Friedrich Hölderlin (died 1843), German
- April 7 – William Wordsworth (died 1850), English Poet Laureate
- April 11 – George Canning (died 1827), English prime minister and occasional poet
- December 9 bapt. – James Hogg (died 1835), Scottish poet and novelist writing in both Scots and English

== Deaths ==
Birth years link to the corresponding "[year] in poetry" article:

- c. January – William Falconer (born 1732), Scottish poet (lost at sea)
- June 21 – Charlotta Frölich (born 1698), Swedish writer
- June 23 – Mark Akenside (born 1721), British poet and physician
- August 24 – Thomas Chatterton, English poet and forger of medieval poetry (born 1752), suicide by arsenic poisoning rather than death by starvation aged 17; although his death is little noticed at the time, he is later an icon of unacknowledged genius for the Romantics
- Also:
  - Friedrich Carl Casimir von Creuz (born 1724), German
  - Alasdair mac Mhaighstir Alasdair (born c.1698), Scottish Gaelic poet
  - Kunchan Nambiar (born 1705), Malayalam language poet, performer, satirist

== See also ==
- List of years in poetry
- List of years in literature
- 18th century in poetry
- 18th century in literature
- French literature of the 18th century
- Sturm und Drang (the conventional translation is "Storm and Stress"; a more literal translation, however, might be "storm and urge", "storm and longing", "storm and drive" or "storm and impulse"), a movement in German literature (including poetry) and music from the late 1760s through the early 1780s
- List of years in poetry
- Poetry
