= John Gilbert Cooper =

British poet and writer

- Born: 24 August 1722; Lockington, Leicestershire
- Died: 21 April 1769 (aged 46); Mayfair
- Known for: poetry

John Gilbert Cooper or John Gilbert (24 August 1722 – 21 April 1769) was a British poet and writer.

== Biography ==
Gilbert's Name Act 1735
- Act of Parliament
- Parliament of Great Britain
- Long title: An Act to enable John Gilbert Esquire and the Heirs Male of his Body to take and use the Surname and Arms of Cooper, pursuant to the Will of John Cooper of Thurgarton Esquire, deceased.
- Citation: 9 Geo. 2. c. 27 Pr.
- Territorial extent: Great Britain

Dates
- Royal assent: 5 May 1736
- Commencement: 15 January 1736 (Note: Start of session.)

Status: Current legislation

John Gilbert was born in Lockington, Leicestershire. His father was left a legacy which included Thurgarton Priory which he was allowed if he changed his name to Cooper by a private act of Parliament, Gilbert's Name Act 1735 (9 Geo. 2. c. 27 Pr.). John Gilbert Cooper was educated locally and then at Westminster School. He completed his education at Trinity College, Cambridge.

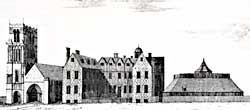
Thurgarton Priory house and the Priory Church of St Peter in 1726

Cooper first published poetry in 1742 occasionally until he became a regular contributor to The Museum which was published by Robert Dodsley. His contributions to Dodsley's journal was under the nom de plume of Philaretes. Cooper's claim to notability comes from his prose, poetry and a public row he had with William Warburton. The row arose from a book he published on Socrates where his work ignored the established view of many including Warburton. Warburton responded to Cooper's 1749, Life of Socrates with an Essay on Criticism in 1751. Cooper unwisely accused Warburton of personal attack in Cursory Remarks on Mr Warburton's New Edition of Mr Pope's Works - it was unwise as he also made personal attacks on Warburton. Samuel Johnson later described Cooper as the Punchinello of literature.

Cooper's 1754 Letters Concerning Taste was said to be the first book on the subject of taste.

Cooper died in Mayfair having devoted the last few years of his life to the Society for the Encouragement of the Arts, Manufactures, and Commerce, but he left when he failed to get elected as vice president. Cooper died early after suffering with kidney stones and was buried at Thurgarton.

== Legacy ==
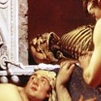
Detail of Wright's Miravan Breaking Open the Tomb of his Ancestors

Besides Cooper's books he also inspired a noted painting by Joseph Wright of Derby. The painting entitled Miravan Breaking Open the Tomb of his Ancestors was based on a story in Cooper's Letters of Taste. Cooper had recounted a story where a greedy nobleman despoils his ancestor's grave in search of riches to find himself cursed by his ancestor.
