= 1755 in poetry =

Nationality words link to articles with information on the nation's poetry or literature (for instance, Irish or France).

== Events ==
- Christopher Smart wins the Seatonian Prize for the fifth time (he won the same prize in 1750; 1751 1752, and 1753
- Paradise Lost is translated into French prose by Louis Racine.

== Works published ==
- Mather Byles, ' 'The Conflagration' ', a long poem in heroic couplets detailing the physical phenomena of Judgment Day, English Colonial America
- John Byrom, Epistle in Defence of Rhyme, published in Roger Comberbach's A Dispute; also published in 1755 under the title The Contest
- George Colman, the elder, and Bonnell Thornton, editors, Poems by Eminent Ladies, an anthology with verse by 18 women poets: Mary Barber, Aphra Behn, Margaret Cavendish, Elizabeth Carter, Mary Chudleigh, Catherine Cockburn, Anne Finch, Constantia Grierson, Mary Jones, Anne Killigrew, Mary Leapor, Judith Madan, Mary Masters, Mary Monck, Mary Wortley Montague, Katherine Philips, Letitia Pilkington, and Elizabeth Singer Rowe
- John Gilbert Cooper, The Tomb of Shakespear (see also the second edition, "corrected; with considerable alterations" and subtitled "A vision" 1755)
- David Dalrymple, editor, Edom of Gordon: an ancient Scottish poem
- Robert Dodsley, fourth volume of Collection of Poems
- Stephen Duck, Caesar's Camp; or, St. George's Hill

== Births ==
Death years link to the corresponding "[year] in poetry" article:

- February 13 – Philibert-Louis Debucourt (died 1832), French painter, engraver and poet
- February 21 – Anne Grant (died 1838), Scottish poet
- March 15 – George Dyer (died 1841), English classicist and prolific writer
- April – Robert Merry (died 1798), English poet and dilettante
- April 16 – Louise Élisabeth Vigée Le Brun (died 1842), French portrait painter and poet
- October – George Galloway, Scottish poet and playwright
- November 6 – Cynthia Lenige (died 1780), Frisian Dutch poet

== Deaths ==
Death years link to the corresponding "[year] in poetry" article:

- June 14 – Mary Barber (born 1685), poet and member of Jonathan Swift's circle
- Vijaya Dasa (born 1682), Indian devotional poet

== See also ==
- Poetry
- List of years in poetry
