= 1763 in poetry =

Nationality words link to articles with information on the nation's poetry or literature (for instance, Irish or France).

== Events ==
- Robert Lloyd is in Fleet Prison for debt. His fellow poet and friend, Charles Churchill, pays a guinea a week for his better maintenance, and raises a subscription to set him free, although Lloyd will still be in prison when he dies next year..
- January – Christopher Smart's asylum confinement ends at Mr Potter's asylum in London (he was admitted to St Luke's Hospital for Lunatics in May 1757 and may have been confined before that; later he was moved to Potter's); while confined, Smart has written A Song to David, published this year, and Jubilate Agno, not published until 1939.
- Approximate date – Chinese Qing dynasty scholar Sun Zhu compiles Three Hundred Tang Poems, an anthology of poems from the Chinese Tang dynasty (618–907).

== Works published ==
=== United Kingdom ===
- Richard Bentley the younger, Patriotism, published anonymously
- Hugh Blair, A Critical Dissertation on the Poems of Ossian, the Son of Fingal, published anonymously; criticism
- John Brown, A Dissertation on [...] Poetry and Music, criticism, including (prefixed) "The Cure of Saul. A Sacred Ode."
- Charles Churchill, Poems (see below)
- William Jones, Caïssa a poem about the mythological origins of chess; written in Latin hexameters (Jones also published an English-language version of the poem; see also Marco Girolamo Vida's Scacchia, Ludus 1527, in which the Caissa character originated)
- George Keate, The Alps
- Robert Lloyd, translator, The Death of Adam: A tragedy, translated from the original German of Friedrich Gottlieb Klopstock's Der Tod Adams
- James Macpherson, Temora: An ancient epic poem, as with Fingal 1762, the author posed as the translator of what he asserted was an ancient Gaelic epic by the supposed Ossian, son of Fingal (see also Works of Ossian 1765)
- William Mason, Elegies
- Christopher Smart, A Song to David (see also A Translation of the Psalms of David 1765)

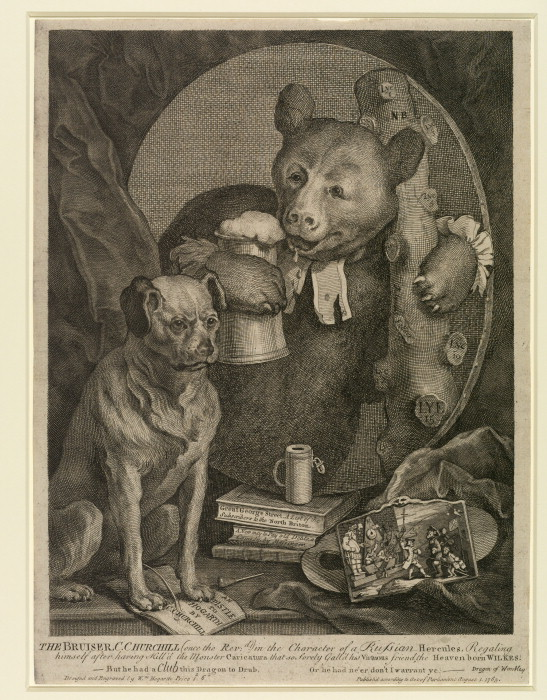
William Hogarth's 1763 cartoon targeting Churchill

==== Charles Churchill's poems of controversy ====
Poet Charles Churchill became a close ally of politician John Wilkes in the early 1760s, and assisted him with the North Briton newspaper. In addition to Poems (see above), these poems were all published this year:

- The Prophecy of Famine: A Scots Pastoral, the first of several Churchill poems that stirred controversy this year, was a violent satire on Scottish influence and fell in with the current hatred of Lord Bute. The Scottish place-hunters were as much alarmed as the actors had been in 1761, when Churchill terrorised them with his Rosciad.
- An Epistle to William Hogarth was in answer to the caricature of Wilkes made during the trial. In the poem, Churchill attacked Hogarth's vanity and envy with an invective which David Garrick quoted as shocking and barbarous. Hogarth retaliated with a caricature of Churchill as a bear in torn clerical bands hugging a pot of porter and a club made of lies and North Britons.
- The Duellist is a virulent satire on the most active opponents of Wilkes in the House of Lords, especially Bishop Warburton.
- The Ghost, was an attack on Samuel Johnson among others, calling Johnson, "Pomposo, insolent and loud, Vain idol of a scribbling crowd."
- The Conference
- The Author, highly praised by Churchill's contemporaries.

=== Other languages ===
- Jean-François Marmontel, Poétique française, (parts were later rewritten in Éléments de littérature 1787) French criticism
- Giuseppe Parini, Il giorno, Italy

== Births ==
Death years link to the corresponding "[year] in poetry" article:

- April 27 (bapt.) – James Hurdis (died 1801), rector of Bishopsgate in Sussex, professor of poetry in Oxford
- May 11 – János Batsányi (died 1845), Hungarian poet
- June 15 – Kobayashi Issa 小林一茶 (died 1828), Japanese poet and Buddhist priest known for his haiku poems and journals; widely regarded as one of the four haiku masters in Japan, along with Bashō, Buson and Shiki
- July 30 – Samuel Rogers (died 1855), English poet
- September 10 – James Thomson (died 1832), Scottish weaver poet
- Also:
  - St. John Honeywood, (died 1798), American
  - Elizabeth Sophia Tomlins (died 1828), English novelist and occasional poet
  - Rahimunnessa, (died 1800s) Bengali poet

== Deaths ==
Birth years link to the corresponding "[year] in poetry" article:

- January 11 – Caspar Abel (born 1676), German theologian, historian, and poet
- January 29 – Louis Racine (born 1692), French poet
- February 11 – William Shenstone (born 1714), English poet
- June 29 – Hedvig Charlotta Nordenflycht (born 1718), Swedish poet, feminist and salon hostess
- September 26 – John Byrom (born 1692), English poet
- date not known – James Sterling (born 1701), English Colonial American

== See also ==
- Poetry
- List of years in poetry
