= 1827 in poetry =

List of years in poetry	(table)
- … 1817; 1818; 1819; 1820; 1821; 1822; 1823; 1824; 1825; 1826; 1827; 1828; 1829; 1830; 1831; 1832; 1833; 1834; 1835; 1836; 1837 …
- In literature 1824 1825 1826 1827 1828 1829 1830
- Art; Archaeology; Architecture; Literature; Music; Philosophy; Science; +...

Nationality words link to articles with information on the nation's poetry or literature (for instance, Irish or France).

== Events ==
- First publication of the 16th century Scottish Bannatyne Manuscript begins in Edinburgh by the Bannatyne Club.

== Works published in English ==
=== United Kingdom ===
- Bernard Barton, A Widow's Tale, and Other Poems
- Robert Bloomfield, The Poems of Robert Bloomfield
- Edward Lytton Bulwer (later Bulwer-Lytton), published anonymously, O'Neill, or, The Rebel
- John Clare, The Shepherd's Calendar; with Village Stories and Other Poems
- George Darley, Sylvia; or, The May Queen
- Reginald Heber, Hymns
- Thomas Hood:
  - The Plea of the Midsummer Fairies; Hero and Leander; Lycus the Centaur; and Other Poems
  - Whims and Oddities in Prose and Verse, second series, poetry and prose (see also Whims and Oddities 1826)
- May Howitt, and William Howitt, The Desolation of Eyam; The Emigrant; A Tale of the American Woods, and Other Poems
- John Keble, published anonymously, The Christian Year, 100 editions were published by 1866
- Letitia Elizabeth Landon, writing under the pen name "L.E.L.", The Golden Violet, and Other Poems
- Robert Millhouse, Sherwood Forest: and other poems.
- Mary Russell Mitford, Dramatic Scenes, Sonnets, and Other Poems
- James Montgomery, The Pelican Island, and Other Poems
- Robert Pollok, The Course of Time, Scottish
- Agnes Strickland, The Seven Ages of Woman, and Other Poems
- Alfred Lord Tennyson, Charles Tennyson, and Frederick Tennyson, published anonymously, Poems, by Two Brothers, despite the title, there were three authors
- William Wordsworth, The Poetical Works of William Wordsworth, text very much revised from Miscellaneous Poems 1820; see also Poetical Works 1836, Poetical Works 1840, and Poetical Works (Centenary Edition) 1870

=== United States ===
- Sumner Lincoln Fairfield, "The Cities of the Plain", a narrative poem about the destruction of Sodom and Gomorrah
- Fitz-Greene Halleck, Alnwick Castle, with Other Poems, the author's first book of poetry sold well and was praised by critics
- Edgar Allan Poe, Tamerlane and Other Poems, initially published anonymously; the author's first poetry book; including "Visit of the Dead", "The Lake", "Evening Star", and "Imitation"
- Lydia Sigourney, Poems
- William Gilmore Simms:
  - Lyrical and Other Poems
  - Early Lays
- Nathaniel Parker Willis, Sketches, the author's first poetry book; mostly Biblical paraphrases

=== Other in English ===
- Henry Louis Vivian Derozio, Poems, Calcutta: Baptist Mission Press; India, Indian poetry in English

== Works published in other languages ==
- Heinrich Heine, Buch der Lieder ("Book of Songs"), the author's first major poetry collection, German author and poet living in France
- Giacomo Leopardi, Operette Morali

== Births ==
Death years link to the corresponding "[year] in poetry" article:

- February 17 – Rose Terry Cooke (died 1892), American
- April 16 – Octave Crémazie (died 1879), Canadian, "the father of French Canadian poetry"
- June 9 – Francis Miles Finch (died 1907), American
- June 18 – Helen Hinsdale Rich (died 1915), American poet
- September 18 – John Townsend Trowbridge (died 1916), American
- November 8 – José Bonifácio the Younger (died 1886), French-born Brazilian politician and poet
- November 26 – Emily Jane Pfeiffer (died 1890), Welsh poet and philanthropist
- Henry Alfred Krishnapillai (died 1900), Indian Tamil language poet
- John Hollin Ridge (died 1867), American
- Fazal Shah Sayyad (died 1890), Indian Punjabi language poet

== Deaths ==
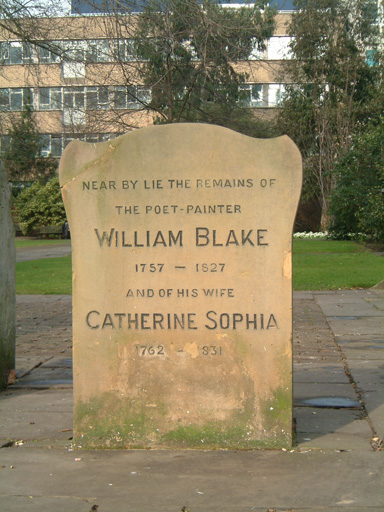
Gravestone of William Blake

Birth years link to the corresponding "[year] in poetry" article:

- January 6 – Charlotte von Stein (born 1742), German member of the court at Weimar, poet and close friend of Johann Wolfgang von Goethe (on whom she was a strong influence) and of Friedrich Schiller
- May 12 – David Richards (Dafydd Ionawr) (born 1751), Welsh
- May 29 – Carlos Wilcox (born 1794), American
- July 3 – David Davis (Castellhywel) (born 1745), Welsh minister and poet
- August 8 – George Canning (born 1770), English statesman and occasional poet
- August 12 – William Blake (born 1757), English poet, artist and visionary
- September 10 – Ugo Foscolo (born 1778), Italian writer, revolutionary and poet
- September 15 – Robert Pollok (born c. 1798), Scottish
- November 10 – St. George Tucker (born 1752), American poet, lawyer and professor of law at the College of William and Mary
- November 18 – Wilhelm Hauff (born 1802, German poet and novelist

== See also ==
- Poetry
- List of years in poetry
- List of years in literature
- 19th century in literature
- 19th century in poetry
- Romantic poetry
- Golden Age of Russian Poetry (1800–1850)
- Weimar Classicism period in Germany, commonly considered to have begun in 1788 and to have ended either in 1805, with the death of Friedrich Schiller, or 1832, with the death of Goethe
- List of poets
