= 1826 in poetry =

List of years in poetry	(table)
- … 1816; 1817; 1818; 1819; 1820; 1821; 1822; 1823; 1824; 1825; 1826; 1827; 1828; 1829; 1830; 1831; 1832; 1833; 1834; 1835; 1836 …
- In literature 1823 1824 1825 1826 1827 1828 1829
- Art; Archaeology; Architecture; Literature; Music; Philosophy; Science; +...

Nationality words link to articles with information on the nation's poetry or literature (for instance, Irish or France).

== Events ==
- June 2 – The Irvine Burns Club is formed at the Milne's Inn under the presidency of Dr. John MacKenzie, who had known the Scottish poet Robert Burns.

== Works published ==
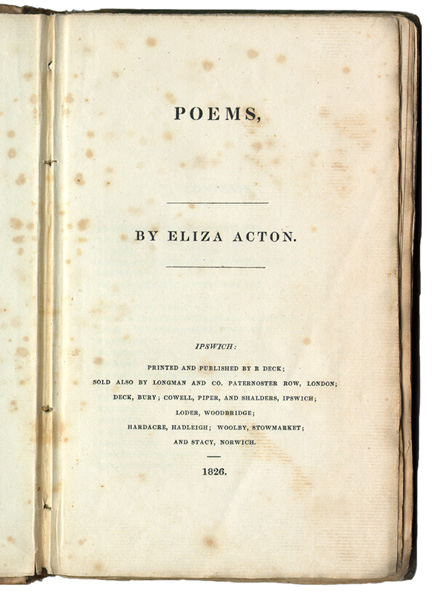
Title page of Poems by Eliza Acton

=== United Kingdom ===
- Eliza Acton, Poems, Ipswich: R. Deck
- Thomas Aird, Murtzoufle: a tragedy
- Anna Laetitia Barbauld, A Legacy for Young Ladies, poetry and prose, edited by Lucy Aikin, posthumous
- George Borrow, Romantic Ballads
- Elizabeth Barrett (later Browning), published anonymously, An Essay on Mind, with Other Poems
- James Hogg, Queen Hynde
- Thomas Hood, Whims and Oddities, poetry and prose (see also, Whims and Oddities 1827)
- Henry Hart Milman, Anne Boleyn
- Amelia Opie, The Black Man's Lament; or, How to Make Sugar
- Robert Millhouse, The Song of the Patriot: sonnets and songs.
- Ann Radcliffe, Gaston de Blondeville; Keeping Festival in Ardenne; St. Alban's Abbey, poetry and prose, with a memoir by Thomas Noon Talfourd; posthumously published
- Percy Bysshe Shelley, Miscellaneous and Posthumous Poems of Percy Bysshe Shelley, unauthorized; parts reissued the same year as Miscellaneous Poems

=== United States ===
- William Cullen Bryant, "I Cannot Forget with What Fervid Devotion", poem, first published this year, revised in 1832, possibly written as early as 1815
- Samuel Woodworth, Melodies, Duets, Songs, and Ballads, including "The Bucket" (first published in 1817 and first published in a collection in 1818); the poem was set to music and became popular as "The Old Oaken Bucket"); another poem in the collection is "The Hunters of Kentucky", a ballad praising those who helped General Andrew Jackson win the Battle of New Orleans, United States

=== Other ===
- Ivan Gundulić (died 1638), Osman, an epic, first published (incomplete; oldest existing copy is from 1651), describes the 1621 Polish victory over the Turks at Chocim (Khotin, Ukraine), Croatia
- Wilhelm Hauff, editor, contributor, Kriegs- und Volks-Lieder ("War and Folk Songs"), anthology of poetry, including two of his own folk songs, "Reiters Morgengesang" ("Morning Song of the Rider") and "Soldatenliebe" ("Soldier's Love"), Germany
- Heinrich Heine, Germany
  - Die Heimkehr ("The Homecoming")
  - Die Nordsee ("The North Sea", first cycle)
- Friedrich Hölderlin, Gedichte, the author's first collected edition, Germany
- Victor Hugo, Odes et Ballades, France
- Adam Mickiewicz, Crimean Sonnets, inspired by a trip to Odessa during his exile in Russia, Poland
- Amable Tastu, Poésies, France
- Charles Tompson, Wild Notes from the Lyre of a Native Minstrel, the first volume of poetry written by a native-born Australian
- Alfred de Vigny, Poèmes antiques et modernes (expanded edition, 1829), France

== Births ==
Death years link to the corresponding "[year] in poetry" article:

- February 27 – Cynthia Roberts Gorton, American poet and author (died 1894)
- March 12 – Robert Lowry, American hymnodist (died 1899)
- April 20 – Dinah Craik (born "Dinah Maria Mulock", also often credited as "Miss Mulock"), English novelist and poet (died 1887)
- July 4 – Stephen Foster, American songwriter (died 1864)

== Deaths ==
Birth years link to the corresponding "[year] in poetry" article:

- April 3 – Reginald Heber (born 1783), Church of England bishop, remembered chiefly as a hymn-writer
- June 23 – John Taylor (born 1750), English businessman, poet and hymn-writer
- June 27 – Mary Leadbeater (born 1758), Irish poet and writer
- July 25 (July 13 O.S.) – Kondraty Ryleyev (born 1795), Russian poet and revolutionary, hanged
- October 3 – Jens Baggesen (born 1764), Danish
- December 26 – Schack von Staffeldt (born 1769), Danish poet and Amtmann
- December 31 – William Gifford (born 1756), English satiric poet and literary editor
- William Glen (born 1789), Scottish

== See also ==
- Poetry
- List of years in poetry
- List of years in literature
- 19th century in literature
- 19th century in poetry
- Romantic poetry
- Golden Age of Russian Poetry (1800–1850)
- Weimar Classicism period in Germany, commonly considered to have begun in 1788 and to have ended either in 1805, with the death of Friedrich Schiller, or 1832, with the death of Goethe
- List of poets
