= 1824 in poetry =

List of years in poetry	(table)
- … 1814; 1815; 1816; 1817; 1818; 1819; 1820; 1821; 1822; 1823; 1824; 1825; 1826; 1827; 1828; 1829; 1830; 1831; 1832; 1833; 1834 …
- In literature 1821 1822 1823 1824 1825 1826 1827
- Art; Archaeology; Architecture; Literature; Music; Philosophy; Science; +...

Nationality words link to articles with information on the nation's poetry or literature (for instance, Irish or France).

== Events ==
- March – Samuel Taylor Coleridge elected a Fellow of the Royal Society of Literature in Britain.
- February 15 – Lord Byron falls ill at Missolonghi while taking part in the Greek War of Independence, dying of fever on April 19.
- May 7 – Première of Beethoven's Symphony No. 9 (the "Choral") at the Theater am Kärntnertor in Vienna, incorporating a setting of Schiller's "Ode to Joy" (Ode an die Freude, 1785).
- May 17 – The publisher John Murray, together with five of Lord Byron's friends and executors, decides to destroy the manuscript of Byron's memoirs (which he has been given to publish) because he considers the scandalous details would damage Byron's reputation. Opposed only by Thomas Moore, the two volumes of memoirs are dismembered and burnt in the fireplace at the John Murray (publisher)'s office, 50 Albemarle Street in London.
- The United States Literary Gazette, a semi-monthly, begins publication. It publishes poetry by Henry Wadsworth Longfellow and William Cullen Bryant, among many others.

== Works published in English ==
=== United Kingdom ===
- Edwin Atherstone, A Midsummer Day's Dream
- Bernard Barton, Revelations of the Dead-Alive
- Robert Bloomfield, The Remains of Robert Bloomfield (posthumous)
- Lord Byron, Don Juan, Cantos XV-XVI (March 24), published anonymously
- Thomas Campbell:
  - Miscellaneous Poems
  - Theodric, and Other Poems
- Catherine Grace Godwin, The Night Before the Bridal; Sappho; and Other Poems, published under the author's maiden name, "Catherine Grace Garnett"
- William Hazlitt, editor, Select British Poets, anthology
- William Knox, Songs of Israel, including "Mortality", Scotland
- Letitia Elizabeth Landon, writing as "L.E.L.", The Improvisatrice, and Other Poems
- Amelia Opie, The Negro Boy's Tale
- Percy Bysshe Shelley, Posthumous Poems of Percy Bysshe Shelley published in June by Mary Shelley; suppressed at insistence of Sir Timothy Shelley in September; includes "Julian and Maddalo", "The Witch of Atlas", "Prince Athanese", "Ode to Naples", "Mont Blanc", "Alastor, or The Spirit of Solitude", "The Triumph of Life", "Marianne's Dream", "Letter to [Maria Gisborne]"

==== Biography, criticism and scholarship in the United Kingdom ====
- Sir Samuel Egerton Brydges, Letters on the Character and Poetical Genius of Lord Byron, criticism
- William Cowper, Private Correspondence of William Cowper, includes some poems

=== United States ===
- William Cullen Bryant:
  - Monument Mountain, a popular, blank-verse poem about an Indian princess who falls in love with her cousin, then commits suicide
  - Mutation
- Royall Tyler, The Chestnut Tree, the author's longest poem presents sketches of those who pass beneath a 200-year-old chestnut tree

== Works published in other languages ==
=== France ===
- Victor Hugo, Nouvelles Odes
- Alfred de Vigny, Éloa, ou La sœur des anges ("Éloa, or the Sister of the Angels"), a three-part epic

=== Other ===
- Giacomo Leopardi, Italian
  - Canzoni
  - Versi
- Wilhelm Müller, German
  - Gedichte aus den hinterlassenen Papieren eines reisenden Waldhornisten ("Poems from the posthumous papers of a travelling horn-player"), concludes publication
  - Lieder der Griechen ("Songs of the Greeks"), concludes publication

== Births ==
Death years link to the corresponding "[year] in poetry" article:

- January 25 – Michael Madhusudan Dutta (মাইকেল মধুসূদন দত্ত also spelled "Maikel Modhushudôn Dôtto" and "Datta") (died 1873), born Madhusudan Dutt, Indian Gujarati and English-language poet and dramatist
- April 5 – Sydney Thompson Dobell (died 1874), English
- May 19 – William Allingham (died 1889), Irish
- July 25 – George Boyer Vashon (died 1878), African American lawyer, abolitionist, poet and scholar
- August 15 – Charles Godfrey Leland (died 1903), American folklorist
- August 21 – Caroline Dana Howe (died 1907), American poet, hymnwriter, and author
- September 4 – Phoebe Cary (died 1871), American
- October – James Lionel Michael (died 1868), Australian
- December 10 – George MacDonald (died 1905), Scots writer, poet and Christian minister
- Also – Aristotelis Valaoritis (died 1879), Greek

== Deaths ==
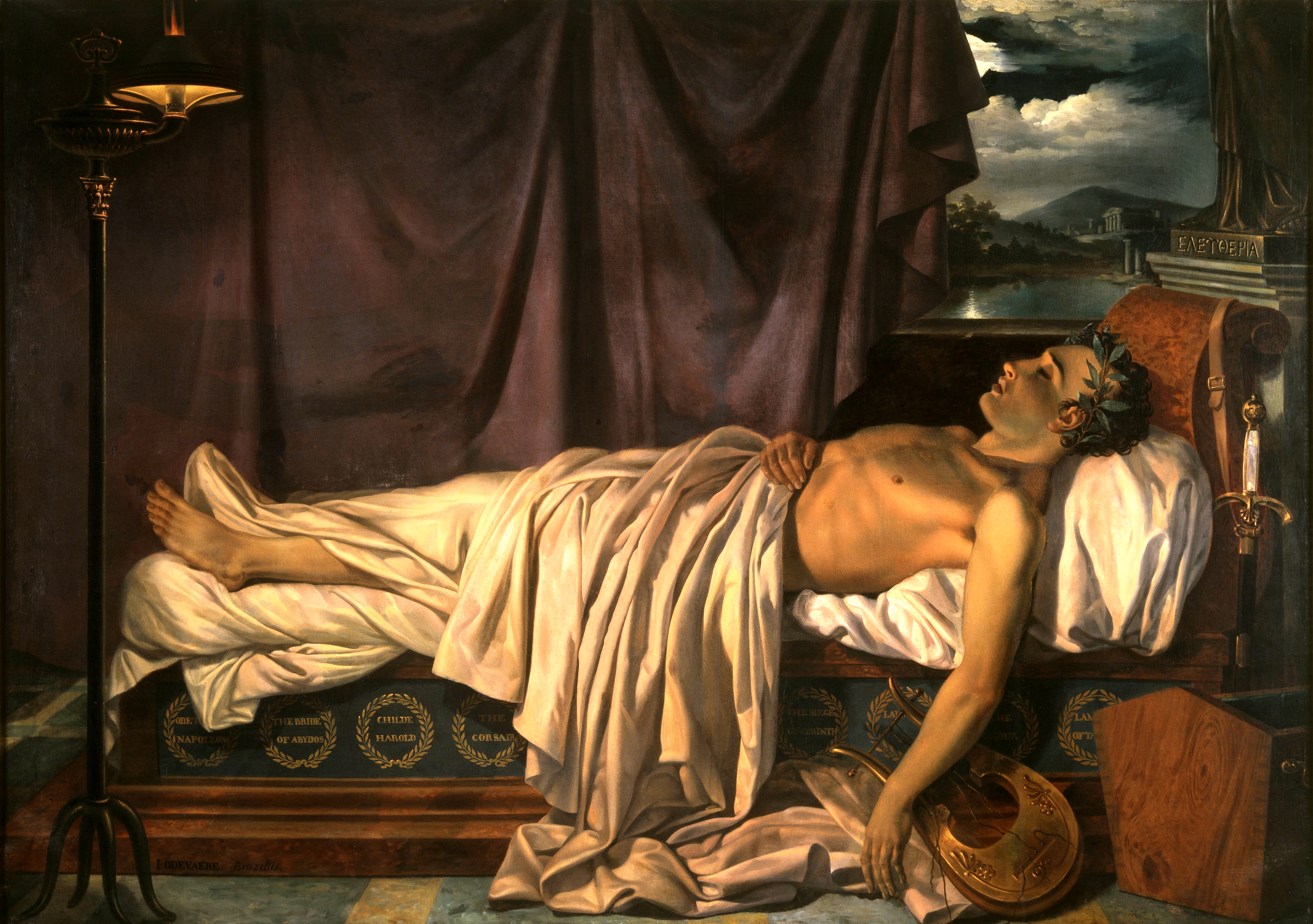
Lord Byron on his deathbed as depicted by Joseph Denis Odevaere c.1826

Birth years link to the corresponding "[year] in poetry" article:

- March 2 – Susanna Rowson (born 1762), British-American novelist, playwright, poet, lyricist, religious writer, stage actress and educator
- March 30 – Thomas Maurice (born 1754), English poet and scholar
- April 13 – Jane Taylor (born 1783), English poet and novelist
- April 19 – Lord Byron (born 1788), English poet and romantic hero
- August 15 – Carl Arnold Kortum (born 1745), German writer, poet and physician
- October 17 – Elizabeth Cobbold (born 1765), English poet
- November 23 – Matthäus Casimir von Collin (born 1779), Austrian poet

== See also ==
- Poetry
- List of years in poetry
- List of years in literature
- 19th century in literature
- 19th century in poetry
- Romantic poetry
- Golden Age of Russian Poetry (1800–1850)
- Weimar Classicism period in Germany, commonly considered to have begun in 1788 and to have ended either in 1805, with the death of Friedrich Schiller, or 1832, with the death of Goethe
- List of poets
