= 1829 in poetry =

List of years in poetry	(table)
- … 1819; 1820; 1821; 1822; 1823; 1824; 1825; 1826; 1827; 1828; 1829; 1830; 1831; 1832; 1833; 1834; 1835; 1836; 1837; 1838; 1839 …
- In literature 1826 1827 1828 1829 1830 1831 1832
- Art; Archaeology; Architecture; Literature; Music; Philosophy; Science; +...

Nationality words link to articles with information on the nation's poetry or literature (for instance, Irish or France).

== Events ==
- The American Monthly Magazine is started in Boston by Nathaniel Parker Willis as a humorous and satirical magazine with essays, fiction, criticism, poetry and humor, largely written by the editor. Other contributors include John Lothrop Motley, Richard Hildreth, Lydia Huntley Sigourney, and Albert Pike. The publication was later absorbed by the New York Mirror
- After the New Harmony utopian community dissolved in 1828, Francis Wright renames the New-Harmony Gazette to the Free Enquirer and broadens its focus to present more socialist and agnostic views
- John Neal, The Yankee and Boston Literary Gazette magazine new series volume 1, the first substantial published criticism of poetry by Edgar Allan Poe

== Works published in English ==
=== United Kingdom ===
- George Crabbe, The Poetical Works of George Crabbe, the first single volume of the author's collected works
- Thomas Doubleday, Dioclesian
- Ebenezer Elliott, The Village Patriarch
- Thomas Hood, The Epping Hunt, illustrated by George Cruikshank
- Caroline Norton, published anonymously
  - The Sorrows of Rosalie: A Tale with Other Poems
  - I Do Not Love Thee
  - The Cold Change
- Prolusiones Academicae, including "Timbuctoo" by Alfred Tennyson (first published in the Cambridge Chronicle, July 10), and poems by C. R. Kennedy and C. Merivale
- Letitia Elizabeth Landon, writing under the pen name "L.E.L.", The Venetian Bracelet, The Lost Pleiad, A History of the Lyre and Other Poems

=== United States ===
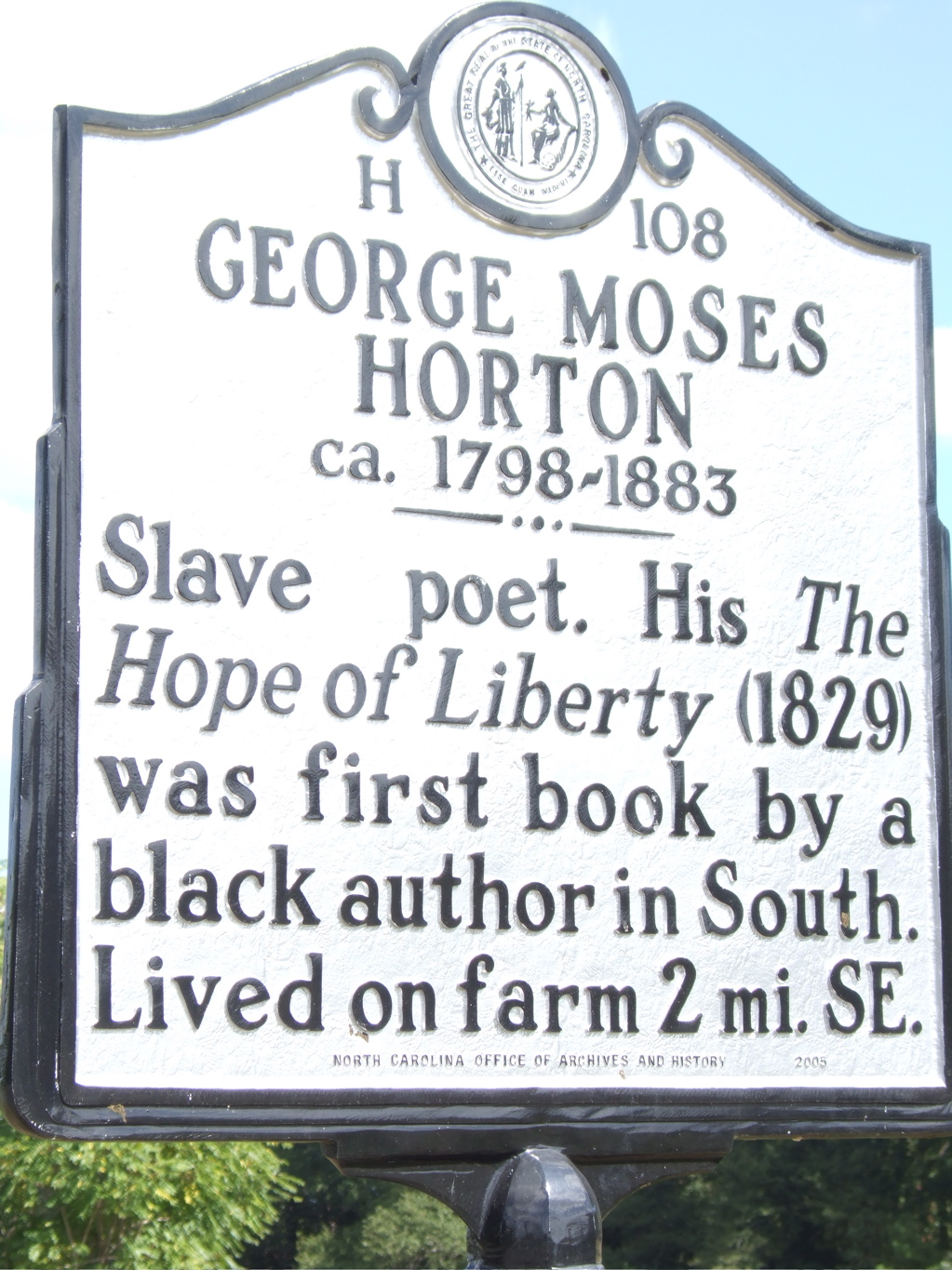
North Carolina sign commemorating George Moses Horton

- Lucretia Maria Davidson, Amir Khan, and Other Poems, published posthumously and edited by her mother
- George Moses Horton, The Hope of Liberty, the first book by an African American poet in more than 50 years and the first by an African American from the South; contains 23 poems, including three on the author's feelings about having been a slave; he had hoped to make enough money from this and later poetry books to buy his freedom, but was unsuccessful; published in Raleigh, North Carolina
- Samuel Kettell, Specimens of American Poetry, with Critical and Biographical Notices, the first comprehensive anthology of American poetry; including 189 poets, a historical introduction and chronological listing of American poetry; the publisher, Samuel Goodrich, lost $1,500 on the publication and was annoyed to learn it had been nicknamed "Goodrich's Kettle of Poetry"
- Edgar Allan Poe, Al Aaraaf, Tamerlane, and Other Poems, including "Al Aaraaf" a shortened version of "Tamerlane", and "Fairyland"
- William Gilmore Simms, The Vision of Cortes, Cain, and other Poems

== Works published in other languages ==
=== France ===
- Victor Hugo:
  - Les Orientales France
  - La Légende des siècles, second series (first series 1859, third series 1883)
- Charles-Augustin Sainte-Beuve, Vie, poesie et pensees de Joseph Delorme, France
- Alfred de Vigny, Poemes antiques et modernes (expanded from the first edition, 1826)

=== Other languages ===
- Alexander Pushkin. Poltava
- Henrik Wergeland, Digte, første Ring; and Creation, Man and the Messiah, epic poem by the Norwegian poet; the sheer scale of the poem invited to criticism; in 1845, on his deathbed, Wergeland will revise the poem and publish it under the title Man.

== Births ==
Death years link to the corresponding "[year] in poetry" article:

- January 12 - Rosanna Eleanor Leprohon, Canadian poet (died 1879)
- July 25 - Elizabeth Siddal, English artists' model, poet, painter and muse (died 1862)
- September 18 - Edna Dean Proctor, American poet (died 1923)
- December 8 - Henry Timrod, American "poet laureate of the Confederacy" (died 1867)
- December 31 - Alexander Smith, Scottish poet of the Spasmodic school (died 1867)
- Black Bart, English-born American gentleman stagecoach robber and versifier (vanished 1888)

== Deaths ==
Death years link to the corresponding "[year] in poetry" article:

- January 11 - Karl Wilhelm Friedrich von Schlegel, German poet and critic (born 1772)
- February 9 - William Crowe, English poet (born 1745)
- May 29 - Sir Humphry Davy, English chemist, inventor and poet (born 1778)

== See also ==
- Poetry
- List of years in poetry
- List of years in literature
- 19th century in literature
- 19th century in poetry
- Romantic poetry
- Golden Age of Russian Poetry (1800–1850)
- Weimar Classicism period in Germany, commonly considered to have begun in 1788 and to have ended either in 1805, with the death of Friedrich Schiller, or 1832, with the death of Goethe
- List of poets
