= 1821 in poetry =

| List of years in poetry | (table) |
- … 1811; 1812; 1813; 1814; 1815; 1816; 1817; 1818; 1819; 1820; 1821; 1822; 1823; 1824; 1825; 1826; 1827; 1828; 1829; 1830; 1831 …
- In literature 1818 1819 1820 1821 1822 1823 1824
- Art; Archaeology; Architecture; Literature; Music; Philosophy; Science; +...

Here lies one whose name was writ in water.

— words chiselled onto the tombstone of John Keats, at his request

Nationality words link to articles with information on the nation's poetry or literature (for instance, Irish or France).

== Events ==
- The Saturday Evening Post founded in Philadelphia
- Lord Byron writes Sardanapalus, The Two Foscari and Cain
- Percy Bysshe Shelley's Queen Mab: a philosophical poem (1813) is distributed by an unauthorized publisher in London leading to prosecution by the Society for the Prevention of Vice.
- English aristocrat George Howard, at this time studying at the University of Oxford, obtains both the chancellor's and the Newdigate prizes there for a Latin poem, Paestum, and an English one.
- At about this date Sunthorn Phu is imprisoned and begins his epic poem Phra Aphai Mani.

== Works published in English ==
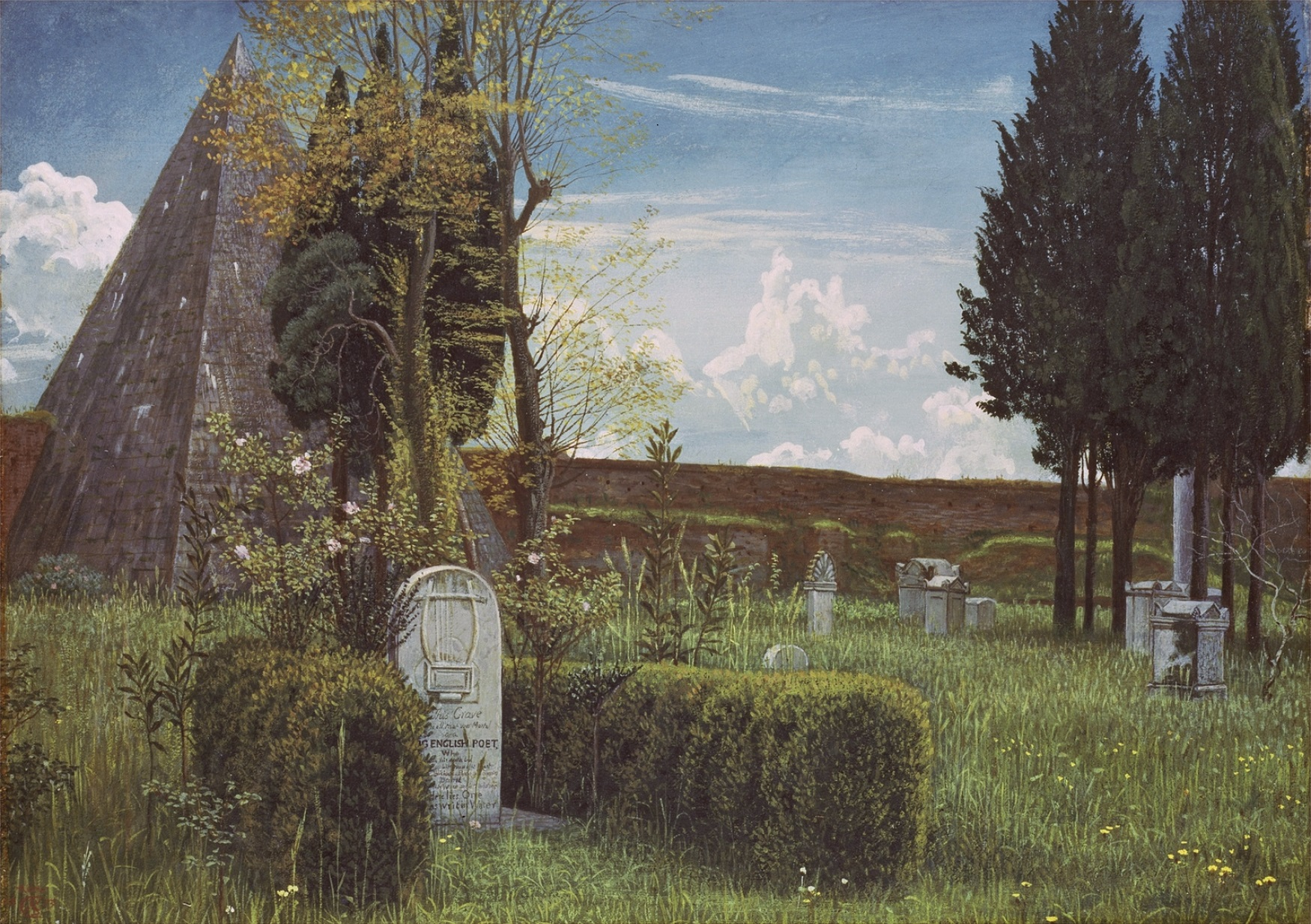
Shelley's Tomb in the Protestant Cemetery in Rome (1873) by Walter Crane. The tombstone in the foreground is actually that of John Keats

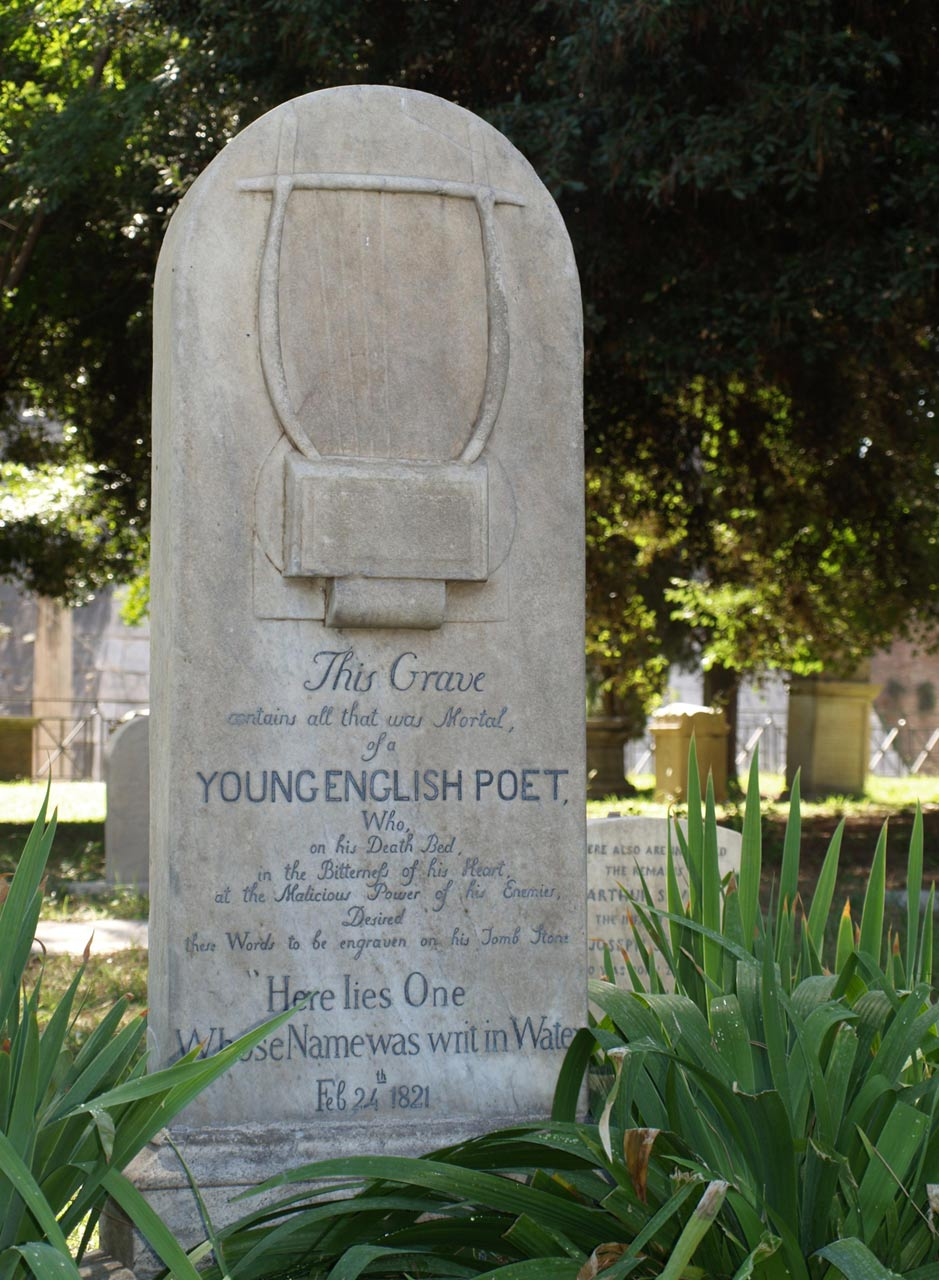
Tomb of John Keats

=== United Kingdom ===
- Edwin Atherstone, The Last Days of Herculaneum
- Joanna Baillie, Metrical Legends of Exalted Characters
- John Banim, The Celt's Paradise
- Thomas Lovell Beddoes, The Improvisatore, in Three Fyttes, with Other Poems
- Lord Byron:
  - Marino Faliero, Doge of Venice; The Prophecy of Dante, Marino Faliero performed April 25
  - Don Juan, cantos 3–5, published anonymously, see also Don Juan 1819, 1823, 1824
  - Sardanapalus; The Two Foscari; Cain, verse drama
  - The Vision of Judgment (spelling is correct)
  - Heaven and Earth
  - The Prophecy of Dante
- John Clare, The Village Minstrel, and Other Poems
- William Gifford, The Satires of Aulus Persius Flaccus, in Latin and English
- Felicia Dorothea Hemans, Dartmoor
- William Hone, The Political Showman — At Home!, illustrated by George Cruikshank; those lampooned include Wellington, Lord Liverpool, George IV, Lord Castlereagh and John Stoddart, editor of The Times
- Leigh Hunt, The Months
- Letitia Elizabeth Landon ("L.E.L."), The Fate of Adelaide, and Other Poems
- Robert Millhouse, Vicissitude, a poem in four books and other pieces
- Thomas Moore, Irish Melodies, the first authorized edition of the author's lyrics; 10 editions by 1832
- Hannah More, Bible Rhymes
- John Henry Newman and John William Bowden, St. Bartholomew's Eve, published anonymously
- John William Polidori (probable suicide August 24), The Fall of the Angels, published anonymously
- Bryan Waller Procter, writing under the pen name "Barry Cornwall", Mirandola: A tragedy, verse drama
- J. H. Reynolds, The Garden of Florence
- Percy Bysshe Shelley:
  - Epipsychidion, published anonymously
  - Adonais: An elegy on the death of John Keats
  - A Defence of Poetry
- Horatio Smith, Amarynthus, the Nympholept, published anonymously
- Robert Southey, A Vision of Judgement, in which Southey criticizes Lord Byron and Percy Bysshe Shelley, labeling them members of what Southey calls the "Satanic School" of poetry; Byron later decides he likes the name, and responds with his own work, A Vision of Judgment (with slightly different spelling in the title)

=== United States ===
- Paul Allen, Noah, about the Bible story, but also discusses slavery and America's place in God's providence; revised by John Neal
- William Cullen Bryant, Poems, eight poems, including "The Ages", a poem in Spenserian stanzas on the history of mankind and expressing a positive outlook on the future, delivered at the Harvard commencement; also the last significant revision of "Thanatopsis"; the book, issued by Richard Henry Dana, Edward Channing and Willard Phillips, is a critical success which promotes Bryant's reputation, but it does not sell well
- James Gates Percival, Poems, including the first part of "Prometheus"

== Works published in other languages ==
- Alexander Pushkin denies it but is widely thought to be the author this April of The Gabrieliad (Гавриилиада, Gavriiliada), Russian, a sexually explicit, blasphemous work
- Heinrich Heine, Gedichte, German, his first published collection
- Wilhelm Müller, German
  - Gedichte aus den hinterlassenen Papieren eines reisenden Waldhornisten ("Poems from the posthumous papers of a travelling horn-player"), begins publication
  - Lieder der Griechen ("Songs of the Greeks"), begins publication

== Births ==
Death years link to the corresponding "[year] in poetry" article:

- February 4 - Frederick Goddard Tuckerman (died 1873), American sonneteer
- March 10 - Màiri Mhòr nan Òran (died 1898), Scottish Gaelic
- March 17 - Adelia Cleopatra Graves (died 1895), American poet, educator, author
- March 19 - Richard Francis Burton (died 1890), English geographer, explorer, translator, writer, soldier, orientalist, cartographer, ethnologist, spy, linguist, poet, fencer, Egyptologist and diplomat
- March 24 - Jeanette Threlfall (died 1880), English hymnwriter and author of religious poems
- March 25 - Isabella Banks, née Varley (died 1897), English
- April 9 - Charles Baudelaire (died 1867), French
- May 29 - Frederick Locker-Lampson (died 1895), English
- July 8 - Maria White Lowell (died 1853), American poet and abolitionist
- September 24 - Cyprian Norwid (died 1883), Polish
- October 15 - Alfred Meissner (died 1885), Austrian
- November 28 - Nikolai Alekseevich Nekrasov (died 1877), Russian
- December 1 - Jane C. Bonar (died 1884), Scottish hymnwriter
- December 27 - Joseph Déjacque (died 1865), French anarchist and poet

== Deaths ==
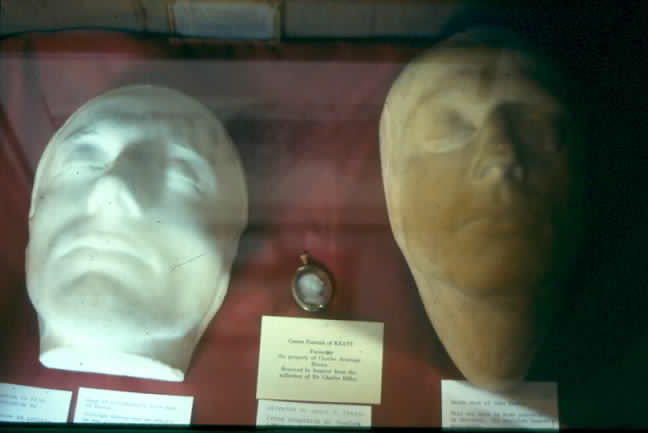
Life and Death masks of John Keats, Rome

Death years link to the corresponding "[year] in poetry" article:

- January 7 – Anne Hunter (born 1742), Scots poet and songwriter who wrote the lyrics to many of Haydn’s songs
- January 14 – Jens Zetlitz (born 1761), Norwegian poet and pastor
- February 23 – John Keats (born 1795), English, in Rome from tuberculosis, buried in the Protestant Cemetery, Rome. His last request is followed, and so he is buried under a tombstone without his name appearing on it but instead the words "Here lies one whose name was writ in water."
- March 17 – Louis-Marcelin de Fontanes (born 1757), French
- April 15 – Johann Christoph Schwab (born 1743), German
- May 11 – George Howe (born 1769), the first Australian editor, poet and early printer
- July 11 – Lucy Terry (born circa 1730 in Africa), first known African American poet, author of "Bars Fight, August 28, 1746", a ballad first printed in 1855
- Undated – Sukey Vickery (born 1799), American novelist and poet (a woman)

== See also ==
- 19th century in literature
- 19th century in poetry
- Golden Age of Russian Poetry (1800–1850)
- List of poets
- List of years in literature
- List of years in poetry
- Poetry
- Romantic poetry
- Weimar Classicism period in Germany, commonly considered to have begun in 1788 and to have ended either in 1805, with the death of Friedrich Schiller, or 1832, with the death of Goethe
