= 1833 in poetry =

List of years in poetry	(table)
- … 1823; 1824; 1825; 1826; 1827; 1828; 1829; 1830; 1831; 1832; 1833; 1834; 1835; 1836; 1837; 1838; 1839; 1840; 1841; 1842; 1843 …
- In literature 1830 1831 1832 1833 1834 1835 1836
- Art; Archaeology; Architecture; Literature; Music; Philosophy; Science; +...

Nationality words link to articles with information on the nation's poetry or literature (for instance, Irish or France).

== Events ==
- June – Rev. John Henry Newman writes "The Pillar of Cloud" (Lead, Kindly Light) on a boat in the Strait of Bonifacio.
- 15 September – English poet Arthur Henry Hallam, a friend of Tennyson (and fiancé of his sister Emily), dies suddenly of a brain haemorrhage in Vienna aged 22. This year in his memory Tennyson writes "Ulysses" (completed 20 October; published in Poems of 1842), Tithon (an early version of "Tithonus") and "The Two Voices" (originally entitled "Thoughts of a Suicide") and begins "Morte d'Arthur" (published 1842) and "Tiresias" (published 1885). In 1850 he will publish In Memoriam A.H.H.

== Works published ==
=== United Kingdom ===
- Elizabeth Barrett (later Elizabeth Barrett Browning), anonymously published translation from the Ancient Greek of Aeschylus, Prometheus Bound
- Edward Bickersteth, Christian Psalmody
- Caroline Bowles (later Caroline Anne Southey), Tales of the Factories
- Robert Browning, Pauline, a fragment of a confession, the author's first published poem, published anonymously, sells no copies (first reprinted in Poetical Works 1868 with minor revisions and an "apologetic preface")
- Agnes Bulmer, Messiah's Kingdom, epic poem running to 14,000 lines, considered the longest poem ever written by a woman
- Hartley Coleridge, Poems
- Allan Cunningham, The Maid of Elvar
- Ebenezer Elliott, The Splendid Village; Corn Law Rhymes, and Other Poems
- Felicia Dorothea Hemans, Hymns on the Works of Nature
- John Stuart Mill, Thoughts on Poetry and its Variants (criticism)
- Robert Montgomery, Woman: The Angel of Life
- Sir Walter Scott (died 1832), The Poetical Works of Sir Walter Scott, Bart, the final revised edition, edited by J. G. Lockhart and illustrated by J. M. W. Turner; in 12 volumes, published starting in May of this year, with Volume I, and ending in April 1834, with Volume XII
- Letitia Elizabeth Landon, writing under the pen name "L.E.L.", Fisher's Drawing Room Scrap Book, 1834, including "The Zenana"

=== United States ===
- Maria Gowen Brooks, Zophiel, highly emotional verse, influenced by her connections with the English Lake poets; Charles Lamb asserted she could not have been the author, "as if there could have been a woman capable of anything so grand"
- Richard Henry Dana Sr., Poems and Prose Writings, a very well received book, including many of his better-known essays and poems, including "The Buccaneer" (see also the expanded edition 1850)
- Maria James, "Ode on the Fourth of July 1833"
- Henry Wadsworth Longfellow, translator, Coplas de Don Jorge Manrique
- Penina Moise, Fancy's Sketch Book, called the first poetry book published by a Jewish American in the United States; including humorous and satirical poems on love, poverty and death as well as comments on the suffering of Jews abroad, who are encouraged to immigrate to the United States

=== Other ===
- M. J. Chapman, "Barbados" by a pro-slavery planter in Barbados
- Marceline Desbordes-Valmore, Les Fleurs, France
- Wilhelm Hey, Fünfzig Fabeln für Kinder ("Fifty Fables for Children")
- Frederik Paludan-Muller, Dandserinden ("The Danseuse" or "Dancing Girl"), inspired by Lord Byron's poetry; an ironic poem in ottava rima; Denmark
- France Prešeren, A Wreath of Sonnets (Slovene: Sonetni venec)
- Alexander Pushkin, The Bronze Horseman (Russian, Медный всадник, literally "The Copper Horseman"), written, first published 1837
- Pietro Zorutti (Pieri Çorut), Plovisine, Friulian

== Births ==
Death years link to the corresponding "[year] in poetry" article:

- 23 January – Lewis Morris (died 1907), Anglo-Welsh poet
- 5 May – Richard Watson Dixon (died 1900), English poet and clergyman
- 29 May – George Gordon McCrae (died 1927), Australian
- 24 August – Narmadashankar Dave, also known as "Narmad" (died 1886), Indian, Gujarati-language poet
- 8 October – Edmund Clarence Stedman (died 1908), American poet, critic, essayist, banker and scientist
- 19 October – Adam Lindsay Gordon, Azores-born Australian "national poet", jockey and politician
- 27 December – Larin Paraske (died 1904), Finnish Izhorian oral poet and rune-singer

== Deaths ==
Birth years link to the corresponding "[year] in poetry" article:

- 4 February – John O'Keefe (born 1747), Irish poet, playwright and actor
- 14 April – Joseph-Isidore Bédard (born 1806), Canadian poet, lawyer and politician, dies in Paris (haemorrhage)
- 7 September – Hannah More (born 1745), English poet, playwright, religious writer and philanthropist
- 15 September – Arthur Hallam (born 1811), English poet in whose memory Alfred, Lord Tennyson later writes In Memoriam A.H.H., dies in Vienna (haemorrhage)
- 26 September – Robert Anderson (born 1770), English Cumbrian dialect poet
- 4 October – Maria Jane Jewsbury (Fletcher) (born 1800), English writer and poet, dies in India (cholera)
- 10 October – Thomas Atkinson (born 1801?), Scottish poet, bookseller and politician, dies at sea (consumption)
- 30 December – William Sotheby (born 1757), English poet and translator
- Date not known – Kaviraja Bankidas Ashiya (born 1771), Rajasthani poet and scholar

== See also ==
- 19th century in literature
- 19th century in poetry
- Golden Age of Russian Poetry (1800–1850)
- List of poetry awards
- List of poets
- List of years in literature
- List of years in poetry
- Poetry
- Young Germany (Junges Deutschland) a loose group of German writers from about 1830 to 1850
