= 1825 in poetry =

List of years in poetry	(table)
- … 1815; 1816; 1817; 1818; 1819; 1820; 1821; 1822; 1823; 1824; 1825; 1826; 1827; 1828; 1829; 1830; 1831; 1832; 1833; 1834; 1835 …
- In literature 1822 1823 1824 1825 1826 1827 1828
- Art; Archaeology; Architecture; Literature; Music; Philosophy; Science; +...

Nationality words link to articles with information on the nation's poetry or literature (for instance, Irish or France).

== Events ==
- La bibliothèque canadienne, a French Canadian magazine edited by Michel Bibaud, begins publishing this year (and will continue to 1830)
- Dalry Burns Club established to honour the memory of Scottish poet Robert Burns; it claims the longest unbroken record of Burns suppers.

== Poetry published ==
=== United Kingdom ===
- Anna Laetitia Barbauld, The Works of Anna Laetitia Barbauld, edited by Lucy Aikin
- Sara Coleridge, translator from the French of Jacques de Mailles, The History of the Chevalier Bayard
- Louisa Costello, Songs of a Stranger
- Allan Cunningham, editor, The Songs of Scotland, Ancient and Modern, anthology
- Robert Davidson, Poems, Scotland
- Charles Dibdin the younger, Comic Tales and Lyrical Fancies
- Alexander Dyce, editor, Specimens of British Poetesses, anthology
- Felicia Dorothea Hemans, The Forest Sanctuary, and Other Poems
- Thomas Hood and J. H. Reynolds, published anonymously, Odes and Addresses to Great People
- Leigh Hunt, Bacchus in Tuscany, translated from the Italian, Bacco in Tuscana ("Bacchus in Tuscany") by Francesco Redi
- Maria Jane Jewsbury, Phantasmagoria, poetry and prose
- William Knox, Harp of Zion, Scotland
- Letitia Elizabeth Landon, writing under the pen name "L. E. L.", The Troubador, Catalogue of Pictures, and Historical Sketches
- Robert Southey, A Tale of Paraguay

=== United States ===
- John Gardiner Calkins Brainard, Occasional Pieces of Poetry, a well-received collection partly reprinting poems the author had contributed to the Connecticut Mirror, which he edited from 1822 to 1827
- William Cullen Bryant:
  - Lectures on Poetry, a series of four lectures given at the New York Athenaeum, presenting his theory of poetry, influenced by English Romantic poets; he also objected to the ideas that America lacked poetic material, that the country's language was too primitive for poetry and that American society was too pragmatic and materialistic to support a national poetry
  - A Forest Hymn
  - The Death of the Flowers
- Charles Follen, Hymns for Children
- Fitz-Greene Halleck, "Marco Bozzaris", inspired by the death of Bozarris, a Greek hero in the war of independence against the Ottoman Empire; the work appeared in several periodicals and was praised, although Edgar Allan Poe criticized it as lacking in lyricism
- William Leggett, Leisure Hours at Sea
- Henry Wadsworth Longfellow, poems published in several newspapers and the United States Literary Gazette include: "Autumnal Nightfall", "Woods in Winter", "The Angler's Song", and "Hymn of the Moravian Nuns"
- Edward Coote Pinkney, Poems, lyric verses including "Rudolph, a Fragment" (first published separately 1823)), in the style of Lord Byron
- William Gilmore Simms, Monody on Gen. Charles Cotesworth Pinckney, Charleston

=== Other ===
- Marceline Desbordes-Valmore, Elégies et Poésies nouvelles, France
- Adam Mickiewicz, Crimean Sonnets, Poland
- Kondraty Ryleyev, Rogneda, Russia, approximate date

== Births ==
Death years link to the corresponding "[year] in poetry" article:

- January 11 – Bayard Taylor (died 1878), American poet and travel writer
- May 4 – Thomas Henry Huxley (died 1895), English evolutionist and occasional poet (Nettie, born Henrietta Heathorn (died 1914), his wife, is also born this year)
- June 6 – Peter John Allan (died 1848), Canadian poet
- July 20 or 25 – John Askham (died 1894), English shoemaker and poet
- September 24 – Frances Harper, born Frances Ellen Watkins (died 1911), black American poet and abolitionist
- October 30 – Adelaide Anne Procter (died 1864), English poet and philanthropist
- Dhiro (born 1753), Gujarati devotional poet

== Deaths ==
Birth years link to the corresponding "[year] in poetry" article:

- March 9 – Anna Laetitia Barbauld (born 1743), English poet
- May 6 – Lady Anne Barnard (born 1750), Scottish-born ballad and travel writer
- August 12 – Magdalene Sophie Buchholm (born 1758), Norwegian poet
- August 27 – Lucretia Maria Davidson (born 1808), American poet, of consumption
- November 12 – William Knox (born 1789), Scottish poet, of a stroke
- December 5 – Mary Whateley (born 1738), English poet and hymnodist

== See also ==
- Poetry
- List of years in poetry
- List of years in literature
- 19th century in literature
- 19th century in poetry
- Romantic poetry
- Golden Age of Russian Poetry (1800–1850)
- Weimar Classicism period in Germany, commonly considered to have begun in 1788 and to have ended either in 1805, with the death of Friedrich Schiller, or 1832, with the death of Goethe
- List of poets
