= 1900 in poetry =

Nationality words link to articles with information on the nation's poetry or literature (for instance, Irish or France).

== Works published in English ==
=== Australia ===
- Henry Lawson, Verses, Popular and Humorous, Angus & Robertson
- Bernard O'Dowd, "Australia"
- George Essex Evans, "Ode for Commonwealth Day"

=== Canada ===
- William Wilfred Campbell, Beyond the Hills of Dream. Toronto.
- Archibald Lampman, The Poems of Archibald Lampman, Duncan Campbell Scott ed., (Toronto: Morang).
- Alexander McLachlan, Poetical Works of Alexander McLachlan.
- Frederick George Scott, Poems Old and New.
- Francis Sherman, A Canadian Calendar: XII Lyrics. Havana, Cuba.

=== United Kingdom ===
- G. K. Chesterton:
  - Graybeards at Play
  - The Wild Knight and Other Poems
- Ford Madox Ford, Poems for Pictures and for Notes of Music
- W. E. Henley, For England's Sake
- Charles Murray, Hamewith, Scots
- Arthur Quiller-Couch, editor, Oxford Book of English Verse 1250-1900
- Lady Margaret Sackville, Floral Symphony

=== United States ===
- Gelett Burgess, Goops and How to Be Them
- Stephen Crane, The Black Riders and Other Lines
- George Moses Horton's Poetical Works
- George Santayana, Interpretations of Poetry and Religion
- Ridgely Torrence, The House of a Hundred Lights

=== Other in English ===
- W. B. Yeats, The Shadowy Waters, Ireland

== Works published in other languages ==
- Konstantin Balmont, Burning Buildings (Gorya′schye zda′niya), his 5th collection of poetry and the one that makes him famous in Russia.
- Natalie Clifford Barney, Quelques Portraits-Sonnets de Femmes, American writing in French and published in Paris
- Paul Claudel, Connaissance de l'Est ("Knowledge of the East"), (expanded edition published in 1907) France
- Stefan George, Hymnen, Pilgerfahrten, and Algabal, a one-volume edition published in Berlin by Georg Bondi which first makes George's work available to the public at large; German
- Marie-Madeleine, Auf Kypros, Germany
- Gregorio Martínez Sierra, Flores de escarcha ("Frost Flowers"), Spain
- C. R. Reddy, Musalamma Maranam, Indian, Telugu-language poem written in traditional metrical form but with a modern outlook, a landmark work in Telugu poetry
- Paul Valéry, Album de vers anciens, published starting in 1890 and ending this year; France

== Births ==
Death years link to the corresponding "[year] in poetry" article:

- January 31 – Marie Luise Kaschnitz (died 1974), German short story writer, novelist, essayist and poet
- February 19 – Giorgos Seferis (died 1971), Greek poet, diplomat and winner of the Nobel Prize in Literature in 1963
- February 26 – Halina Konopacka (died 1989), Polish-born discus thrower and poet
- March 3 – Basil Bunting (died 1985), British modernist poet
- March 4 – Jean-Joseph Rabearivelo or "Rebearivelo" (died 1937), Malagassy, French-language poet
- April 1 – Alexandru A. Philippide (died 1979), Romanian poet
- April 19 – Richard Hughes (died 1976), British poet, novelist, playwright and writer
- May 11 – Rose Ausländer maiden name and pen name of Rosalie Beatrice Scherzer (died 1988), German poet and writer
- May 27 – Uładzimir Žyłka (died 1933), Belarusian poet
- May 30 – Itsik Manger (or "Itzig Manger") (died 1969), Yiddish poet and playwright
- June 10:
  - Eric Maschwitz (died 1969) English poet, entertainer, writer, broadcaster and broadcasting executive
  - Wilhelm Emanuel Süskind (died 1970) German writer, poet, journalist and translator
- July 4 – Robert Desnos (died 1945), French surrealist poet
- July 22 – Edward Dahlberg (died 1977), American novelist, writer and poet
- August 12 – Robert Francis (died 1987), American
- August 20 – Salvatore Quasimodo (died 1968), Italian poet who won the Nobel Prize for Literature in 1959
- August 23 – Tatsuji Miyoshi 三好達治 (died 1964), Japanese Shōwa period literary critic, editor and poet
- September 23 – Jaroslav Seifert (died 1986), Czech writer, poet and journalist who won the Nobel Prize for Literature in 1984
- October 17 – Yvor Winters (died 1968) American literary critic and poet
- October 20 – Jack Lindsay (died 1990), Australian
- December 7 – Christian Matras, Faroese poet and linguist (died 1988)
- December 21 – Oda Schaefer (died 1988), German
- Also:
  - Paula Ludwig (died 1974), German

== Deaths ==
Birth years link to the corresponding "[year] in poetry" article:

- January 19 – William Larminie, 50 (born 1849), Irish poet and folklorist
- January 20 – R. D. Blackmore (born 1825), English novelist and poet
- January 23 – Richard Watson Dixon, 76 (born 1833), English poet and divine
- January 29 – John Ruskin, 80 (born 1819), English art critic and social critic
- January 31 – John Sholto Douglas, 9th Marquess of Queensberry, 55 (born 1844), nemesis of Oscar Wilde
- February 21 – Henry Duff Traill, 67 (born 1842), British author, poet and journalist
- February 23 – Ernest Dowson, 32 (born 1867), English poet associated with the Decadent movement
- February 24 – Richard Hovey, 35 (born 1864), American composer, poet and artist
- June 5 – Stephen Crane, 28 (born 1871), American novelist, poet and journalist
- August 13 (O.S. July 31) – Vladimir Solovyov, 47 (born 1853), Russian philosopher and poet
- August 24 – Friedrich Nietzsche (born 1844), German philosopher, classical philologist and poet
- October 20 – Naim Frashëri, 54 (born 1846), Albanian poet and writer
- November 30 – Oscar Wilde, 46 (born 1854), Irish playwright, novelist, poet and short story writer
- Also:
  - Ludwig Jacobowski (born 1868), German

== See also ==
- 19th century in poetry
- 20th century in poetry
- 19th century in literature
- 20th century in poetry
- List of years in poetry
- List of years in literature
- Victorian literature
- French literature of the 19th century
- French literature of the 20th century
- Silver Age of Russian Poetry
- Symbolist poetry
- Young Poland (Młoda Polska) a modernist period in Polish arts and literature, roughly from 1890 to 1918
- Poetry
