= 1898 in poetry =

This article covers 1898 in poetry. Nationality words link to articles with information on the nation's poetry or literature (for instance, Irish or France).

== Events ==
=== The "Generation of '98" in Spain ===
The "Generation of '98" (also called "Generation of 1898", in Spanish, Generación del 98 or Generación de 1898) was a group of novelists, poets, essayists, and philosophers active in Spain at the time of the Spanish–American War. Jose Martínez Ruiz, commonly known as Azorín, comes up with the name in 1913 to allude to the moral, political, and social crisis produced by Spain's defeat. Writing mostly after 1910, the group reinvigorates Spanish letters, revives literary myths and breaks with classical schemes of literary genres. In politics, members of the movement often justify radicalism and rebellion.

== Works published in English ==
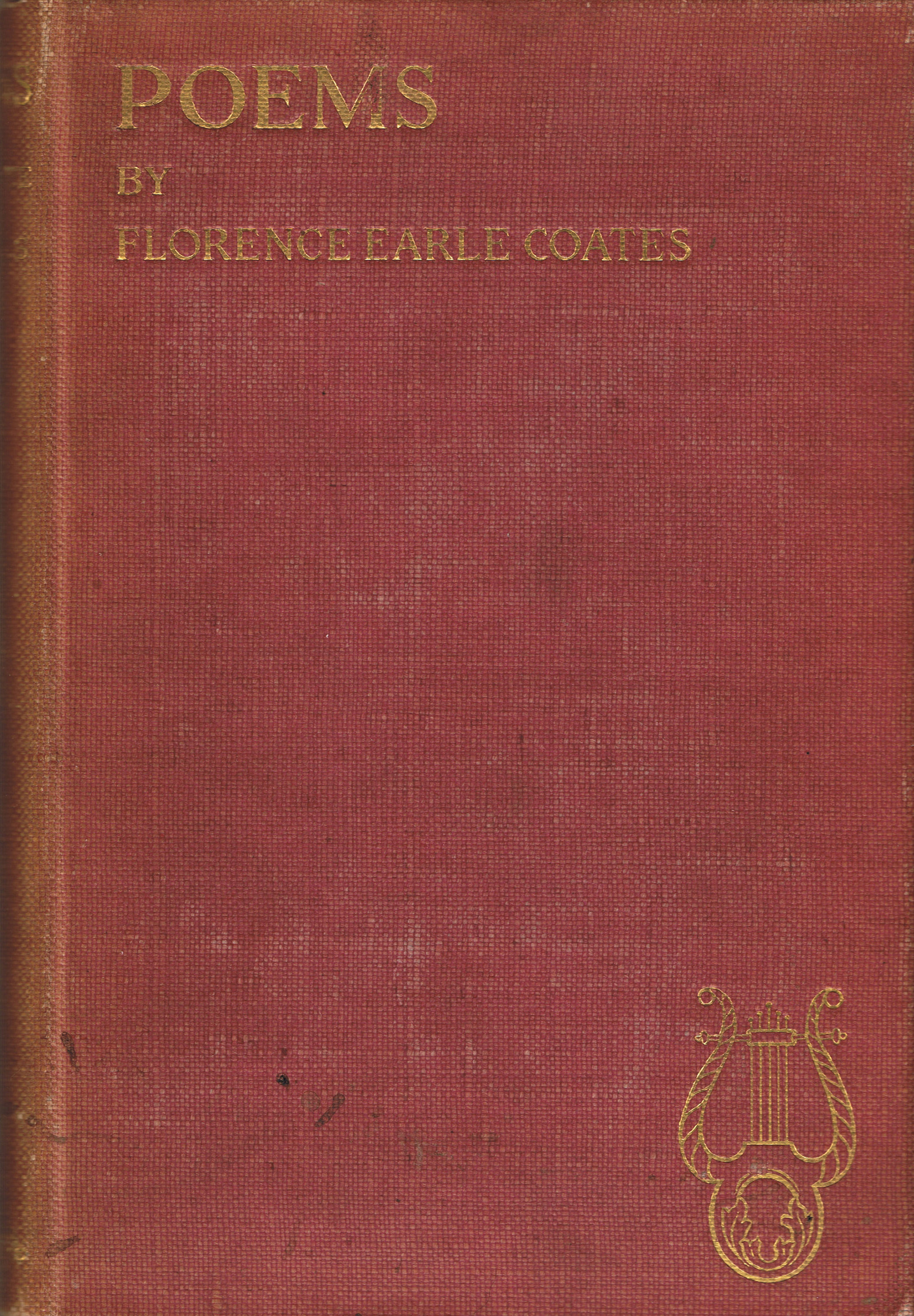
First edition copy of Poems (1898) by Florence Earle Coates.

=== Canada ===
- Bliss Carman, By the Aurelian Wall
- William Henry Drummond, Phil-o-rum’s Canoe and Madeleine Vercheres: Two Poems, New York: G.P. Putnam’s Sons.
- Charles G. D. Roberts, New York Nocturnes and Other Poems
- Duncan Campbell Scott, Labor and the Angel, including "The Onondaga Madonna", Canada

=== United Kingdom ===
- Alfred Austin:
  - Lamia's Winter-Quarters
  - Songs of England
- Robert Bridges, Poetical Works, Volume 1; published in six volumes through 1905
- Thomas Hardy, Wessex Poems and Other Verses
- W. E. Henley, Poems
- Henry Newbolt, The Island Race
- Stephen Phillips, Poems
- William Watson, The Hope of the World, and Other Poems
- Theodore Watts-Dunton, The Coming of Love, and Other Poems
- Oscar Wilde, published under the pen name "C.3.3" (in June the 7th edition is published under Wilde's name), The Ballad of Reading Gaol

=== United States ===
- Florence Earle Coates, Poems
- Paul Laurence Dunbar
  - Folks from Dixie
  - The Uncalled
- Louise Imogen Guiney, England and Yesterday
- Richard Hovey, Along the Trail: A Book of Lyrics
- Edgar Lee Masters, A Book of Verses
- Josephine Preston Peabody, The Wayfarers

=== Other in English ===
- Victor Daley, At Dawn and Dusk, Australia

== Works published in other languages ==
=== France ===
- Francis Jammes:
  - De l'Angélus de l'aube à l'Angélus du soir ("From the Morning Prayer to the Evening Prayer")
  - Quatorze prières
- Charles Van Lerberghe, Entrevisions

=== Other languages ===
- Pieter Cornelis Boutens, Verzen ("Verses"), Netherlands
- José Santos Chocano, Selva virgen ("Virgin Jungle"), Peru
- Manilal Dwivedi, Amar Asha, India, Gujarati-language, in his magazine Sudarshan
- Naim Frashëri, Histori e Skënderbeut and Qerbelaja, Albania
- Chanda Jha, Mithila bhasa Ramayana, India, Maithili-language
- Gregorio Martínez Sierra, El poema del trabajo ("The poem of work"), Spain

== Births ==
Death years link to the corresponding "[year] in poetry" article:

- January 19 – Philip Child (died 1978), Canadian novelist and poet
- February 6 – Melvin B. Tolson (died 1966), African American Modernist poet, educator, columnist, trade unionist and politician
- February 9 – Yagi Jūkichi, 八木重吉 (died 1927), Japanese (surname: Yagi)
- February 18 – Luis Muñoz Marín (died 1980), Puerto Rican poet, journalist and politician
- February 19 – Richard Rudzitis (died 1960), Latvian poet, writer and philosopher
- March 9 – Fuyue Anzai 安西 冬衛 (died 1965), Japanese, poet and co-founder of the magazine Shi To Shiron ("Poetry and Poetics"), surname: Anzai
- March 20 – Luis Palés Matos (died 1959), Puerto Rican poet
- April 2 – Harindranath Chattopadhyay (died 1990), Indian poet writing in English and film actor
- April 10 – Horace Gregory (died 1982), American poet, translator, literary critic and academic; husband of poet and editor Marya Zaturenska
- April 24 – Govinda Krishna Chettur (died 1936), Indian poet writing in English
- April 26 – Vicente Aleixandre (died 1984), Spanish poet
- April 28 – William Soutar (died 1943), Scottish poet writing in English and Scots
- May 7 – Dorothy Vena Johnson (died 1970), African American educator and poet
- June 4 – Harry Crosby (died 1929), American publisher and poet
- June 5 – Federico García Lorca (killed 1936), Spanish poet
- June 13 – Anton Podbevšek (died 1981), Slovene avant-garde poet
- July 17 – Richard Harry Graves (died 1971), Australian
- July 22 – Stephen Vincent Benét (died 1943), American author, poet, short story writer and novelist
- August 15 – Jan Brzechwa (died 1966), Polish poet
- August 28 – Malcolm Cowley (died 1989), American novelist, poet, literary critic and journalist
- September 15 – J. Slauerhoff (died 1936), Dutch poet and novelist
- October 22
  - Dámaso Alonso, Spanish poet (died 1990)
  - Edgell Rickword (died 1982), English poet, critic, journalist, literary editor and a leading communist intellectual in the 1930s
- November 14 – Benjamin Fondane, né Wechsler (killed 1944), Romanian-French Symbolist poet, critic and existentialist philosopher

== Deaths ==
Death years link to the corresponding "[year] in poetry" article:

- January 14 – Lewis Carroll (born 1832), English writer of fiction for children and nonsense verse
- January 26 – Cornelia J. M. Jordan (born 1830), U.S. poet and lyricist
- March 6 – Felice Cavallotti (born 1842), Italian poet, playwright and politician, killed in duel
- May 10 – Alexander MacGregor Rose (born 1846), Scottish-born Canadian poet
- July 20 – Jean Ingelow (born 1820), English poet and novelist
- July 24 – Evan MacColl (born 1808), Scottish-born Canadian poet writing in Scottish Gaelic and English
- September 9 – Stéphane Mallarmé (born 1842), French symbolist poet
- September 20 – Theodor Fontane (born 1819), German novelist and poet
- October 1 – Manilal Dwivedi (born 1858), Indian, Gujarati-language writer
- November 7 – Màiri Mhòr nan Òran (born 1821), Scottish Gaelic poet
- Kavishwar Dalpatram Dahyabhai, popularly known as "Dalpatram" (born 1820), Indian, Gujarati-language poet; father of poet Nanalal Dalpatram Kavi

== See also ==
- 19th century in poetry
- 19th century in literature
- List of years in poetry
- List of years in literature
- Victorian literature
- French literature of the 19th century
- Symbolist poetry
- Young Poland (Młoda Polska) a modernist period in Polish arts and literature, roughly from 1890 to 1918
- Poetry
