= 1822 in poetry =

List of years in poetry	(table)
- … 1812; 1813; 1814; 1815; 1816; 1817; 1818; 1819; 1820; 1821; 1822; 1823; 1824; 1825; 1826; 1827; 1828; 1829; 1830; 1831; 1832 …
- In literature 1819 1820 1821 1822 1823 1824 1825
- Art; Archaeology; Architecture; Literature; Music; Philosophy; Science; +...

Nationality words link to articles with information on the nation's poetry or literature (for instance, Irish or France).

== Events ==
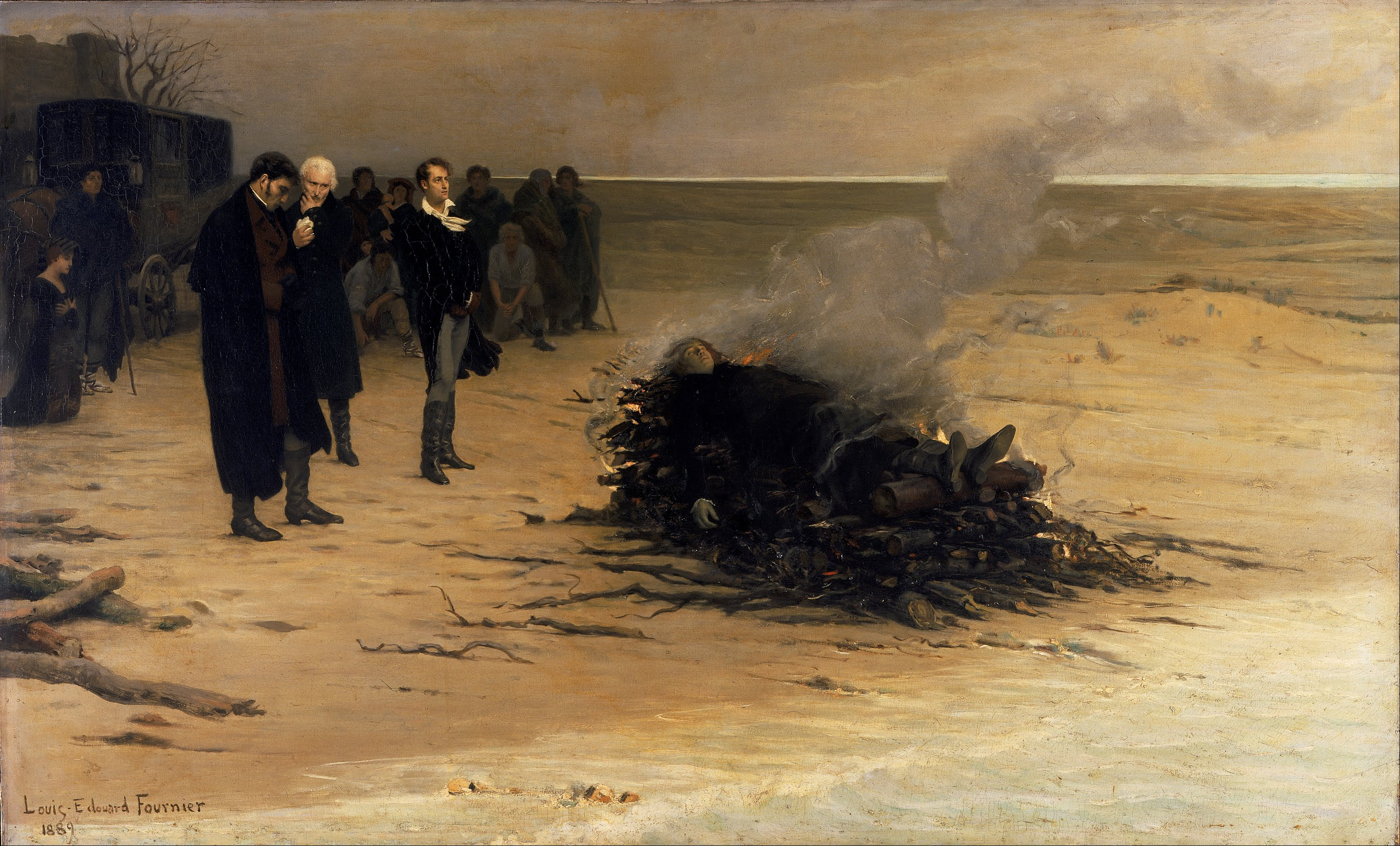
The Funeral of Shelley by Louis Edouard Fournier (1889); in the forefront from left: Edward John Trelawny, Leigh Hunt (who actually did not leave his carriage) and Lord Byron

- July – English poets Lord Byron, Leigh Hunt and Percy Bysshe Shelley agree to start The Liberal, a quarterly published by John Hunt in London from 15 October; it lasts for four issues.
- 8 July – Percy Bysshe Shelley, returning from setting up The Liberal in Livorno to Lerici on the Ligurian Sea of Italy, is drowned as his boat, the Don Juan, sinks in a storm. His decomposed body, washed ashore ten days later on the beach near Viareggio, is identified by a copy of Keats's Lamia and Isabella in the jacket pocket and cremated there in the presence of his friends Lord Byron and the adventurer Edward John Trelawny, who claims to have seized Shelley's heart from the flames. He gives it to Mary Shelley, who keeps it for the rest of her life. Shelley's ashes are interred at the Protestant Cemetery, Rome, where Keats was buried the year before.
- Uzbek poet Nodira becomes regent of the Khanate of Kokand during the minority of her son.

== Works published in English ==
=== United Kingdom ===
- William Barnes, Orra: A Lapland tale
- Bernard Barton:
  - Napoleon, and Other Poems
  - Verses on the Death of Percy Bysshe Shelley
- Thomas Haynes Bayly Erin, and Other Poems
- Thomas Lovell Beddoes, The Bride's Tragedy
- Robert Bloomfield, May Day with the Muses
- Caroline Bowles (later Caroline Anne Southey), The Widow's Tale, and Other Poems
- Lord Byron:
  - Cain
  - Sardanapalus
  - The Two Foscari
  - The Vision of Judgment, published anonymously as by "Quevedo Redivivus" in the first number of The Liberal, written in response to Southey's A Vision of Judgement 1821; publisher John Hunt omits Byron's preface justifying the attack on Southey, indicating to Byron that the omission results from Byron's regular publisher John Murray withholding it when he forwarded the poem to Hunt.
  - Werner
- George Croly, Catiline: A tragedy, including poems
- Allan Cunningham, Sir Marmaduke Maxwell; The Mermaid of Galloway; The legend of Richard Faulder; and Twenty Scottish Songs
- George Darley, The Errors of Ecstasie: A dramatic poem
- Sir Aubrey de Vere, Julian the Apostate
- Caroline Fry, Serious Poetry
- James Hogg:
  - The Poetical Works of James Hogg
  - The Royal Jubilee: A Scottish mask, verse drama
- Charles Lloyd, The Duke d'Ormond; and Beritola
- Henry Hart Milman:
  - Balshazzar
  - The Martyr of Antioch
- Eleanor Anne Porden, Coeur de Lion
- Samuel Rogers, Italy: Part the first, published anonymously, Part the Second 1828
- Sir Walter Scott, Halidon Hill
- Percy Bysshe Shelley, Hellas
- William Wordsworth, Ecclesiastical Sonnets

=== United States ===
- Hew Ainslie, published anonymously A Pilgrimage to the Land of Burns, a travel diary of a tour of Scotland with elaborate descriptions of the scenery and with poetry inspired by the trip, published the same year as the author migrated to the United States
- McDonald Clarke, Elixir of Moonshine, Being a Collection of Prose and Poetry by the Mad Poet, including the couplet "Now twilight lets her curtain down / And Pins it with a star." Clarke was known as "the Mad Poet of Broadway" for his eccentric behaviour, with impulsive, dramatic reactions to music, fashion and society, although his mild insanity worsened later.
- James Lawson, "Ontwa, the Son of the Forest", describing the life of Erie Indians, including notes by Lewis Cass, territorial governor of Michigan; the poem was later included in Columbian Lyre; or, Specimens of Transatlantic Poetry, published in Glasgow 1828.
- James McHenry, The Pleasures of Friendship, short lyric poems and a 1,200-line title poem; nine more editions of the book appeared in the author's lifetime, each with added minor poems
- James Gates Percival, Clio, the first two volumes of poetic soliloquies. A third was published in 1827.

== Other languages ==
- Victor Hugo, Odes et poésies diverses, France
- Alfred de Vigny, Poèmes, anonymously published; the author's first published book of poems, France

== Births ==
Death years link to the corresponding "[year] in poetry" article:

- 14 February – Susan Archer Weiss (died 1917), American poet
- 12 March – Thomas Buchanan Read (died 1872), American poet and portrait painter
- 10 April – James Monroe Whitfield (died 1871), African American
- 16 July – Charles Sangster (died 1893), Canadian
- 4 December – Georg Christian Dieffenbach (died 1901), German
- 24 December – Matthew Arnold (died 1888), English poet and essayist

== Deaths ==
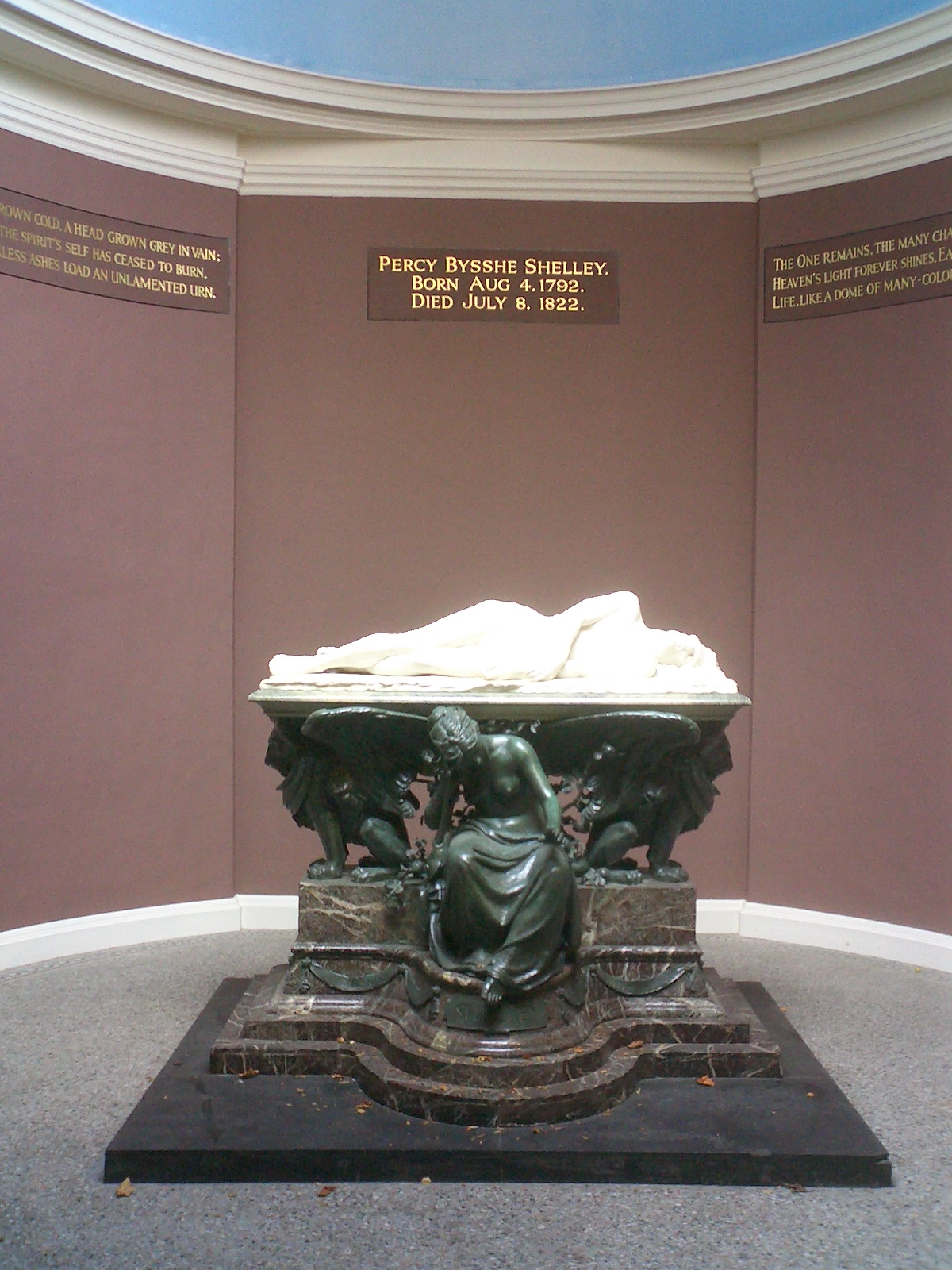
Shelley Memorial, University College, Oxford

Birth years link to the corresponding "[year] in poetry" article:

- 19 March – Józef Wybicki (born 1747), Polish
- 27 March – Sir Alexander Boswell, 1st Baronet (born 1775), Scottish politician, poet, songwriter and antiquary, killed in duel
- 8 July – Percy Bysshe Shelley (born 1792), English
- 4 August (23 July O.S.) – Kristjan Jaak Peterson (born 1801), "father of Estonian poetry"
- 7 December – John Aikin (born 1747), English editor
- Date unknown – Hồ Xuân Hương (born 1772), late Lê dynasty Vietnamese

== See also ==
- Poetry
- List of years in poetry
- List of years in literature
- 19th century in literature
- 19th century in poetry
- Romantic poetry
- Golden Age of Russian Poetry (1800–1850)
- Weimar Classicism period in German poetry, commonly seen to have begun in 1788 and ended in 1805, with the death of Friedrich Schiller, or 1832, with that of Goethe
- List of poets
