= 19th century in poetry =

== Decades and years ==
1790s	1790	1791	1792	1793	1794	1795	1796	1797	1798	1799
1800s	1800	1801	1802	1803	1804	1805	1806	1807	1808	1809
1810s	1810	1811	1812	1813	1814	1815	1816	1817	1818	1819
1820s	1820	1821	1822	1823	1824	1825	1826	1827	1828	1829
1830s	1830	1831	1832	1833	1834	1835	1836	1837	1838	1839
1840s	1840	1841	1842	1843	1844	1845	1846	1847	1848	1849
1850s	1850	1851	1852	1853	1854	1855	1856	1857	1858	1859
1860s	1860	1861	1862	1863	1864	1865	1866	1867	1868	1869
1870s	1870	1871	1872	1873	1874	1875	1876	1877	1878	1879
1880s	1880	1881	1882	1883	1884	1885	1886	1887	1888	1889
1890s	1890	1891	1892	1893	1894	1895	1896	1897	1898	1899
1900s	1900	1901	1902	1903	1904	1905	1906	1907	1908	1909
