= 1864 in poetry =

Nationality words link to articles with information on the nation's poetry or literature (for instance, Irish or France).

== Events ==
- April – Charles Baudelaire leaves Paris for Belgium in the hope of resolving his financial difficulties.

== Works published ==
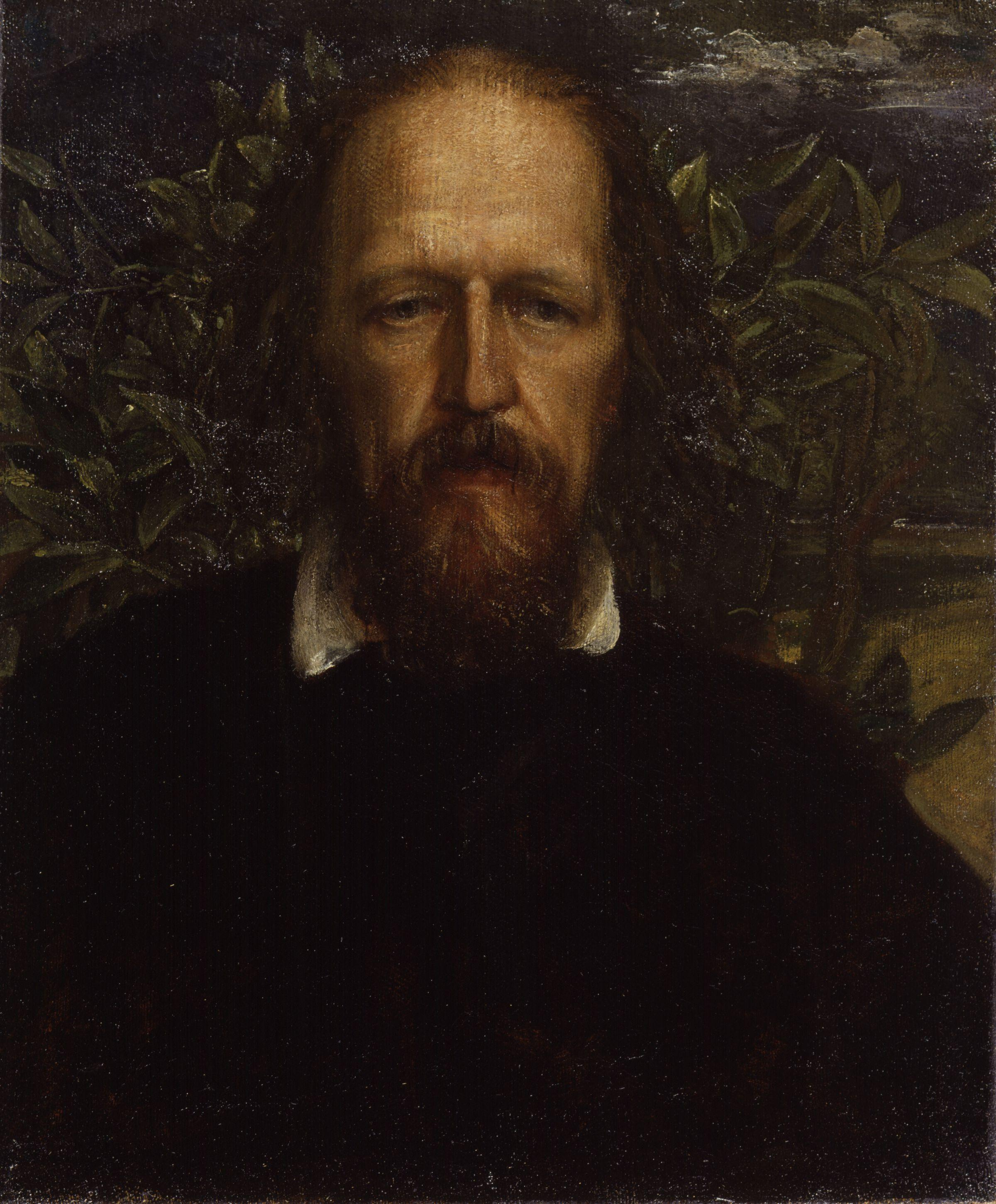
Alfred Lord Tennyson portrait by George Frederic Watts, painted 1863 or this year

=== Canada ===
- Charles Heavysege:
  - The Owl (Montreal)
  - The Dark Huntsman (a dream) (Montreal)

=== United Kingdom ===
- William Allingham:
  - Laurence Bloomfield in Ireland
  - Editor, The Ballad Book, anthology
- Robert Browning, Dramatis Personae, including "Rabbi Ben Ezra" and "Caliban upon Setebos"
- Edward Hartley Dewart, Selections from Canadian Poets, the first anthology of Canadian poetry in English
- Samuel Ferguson, Lays of the Western Gael
- Robert Lowry, "Beautiful River"
- George MacDonald, Adela Cathcart, fairy tales, parables and poems
- Winthrop Mackworth Praed, Poems, including a memoir by Derwent Coleridge, posthumously published
- William Brighty Rands, anonymously published, Lilliput Levee, for children
- Joseph Skipsey, The Collier Lad and other Lyrics
- Alfred Lord Tennyson, Enoch Arden

=== United States ===
- George Henry Baker, Poems of the War
- William Cullen Bryant:
  - Thirty Poems
  - Hymns
- Laura Redden Searing, Idyls of Battle and Poems of the Rebellion
- Edmund Clarence Stedman, Alice of Monmouth: An Idyll of the Great War and Other Poems
- John Greenleaf Whittier, In War Time, United States

=== Other ===
- Aleardo Aleardi, I fuochi sull'Appennibo, Italy
- Alfred de Vigny, Les Destinées, philosophical poems on discipline and social order; posthumously published (died 1863), France

== Births ==
Death years link to the corresponding "[year] in poetry" article:

- April 8 – Orelia Key Bell (died 1959), American
- May 4 – Richard Hovey (died 1900), American
- February 17 – Andrew "Banjo" Paterson (died 1941), Australian writer and poet
- April 30 (April 18 O.S.) – Juhan Liiv (died 1913), Estonian
- September 18 – Itō Sachio 伊藤佐千夫, pen name of Itō Kojirō (died 1913), Japanese, Meiji period tanka poet and novelist (surname: Itō)
- September 29 – Miguel de Unamuno (died 1936), Spanish essayist, novelist, poet, playwright and philosopher
- November 26 – Herman Gorter (died 1927), Dutch poet and socialist
- November 30 – Sydney Jephcott (died 1951), Australian

== Deaths ==
Birth years link to the corresponding "[year] in poetry" article:

- January 13 – Stephen Foster (born 1826), American songwriter
- January 29 – Lucy Aikin (born 1781), English writer
- February 2 – Adelaide Anne Procter (born 1825), English poet, a daughter of poet Bryan Procter
- April 18 – Juris Alunāns (born 1832), Latvian philologist and poet
- May 20 – John Clare (born 1793), English "peasant poet"
- July 4 – Nathaniel Hawthorne (born 1804), American writer
- July 6 – George Pope Morris (born 1802), American editor, poet and songwriter
- September 17 – Walter Savage Landor (born 1775), English writer and poet
- November 3 – Gonçalves Dias (born 1823), Brazilian (shipwreck)

== See also ==
- 19th century in poetry
- 19th century in literature
- List of years in poetry
- List of years in literature
- Victorian literature
- French literature of the 19th century
- Poetry
