= Luke the Labourer =

1826 play

- Original language: English
- Written by: John Baldwin Buckstone
- Genre: Melodrama

Premiere
- Date: 17 October 1826
- Place: Adelphi Theatre, London

Luke the Labourer; Or, The Lost Son is an 1826 play by the British writer John Baldwin Buckstone, in the melodrama genre. It was originally performed at the Adelphi Theatre in London's West End. The play addressed the recent spate of rural unrest in Britain, choosing to set it in the present rather than more safely in a historical setting as other works did. The play is notable for its title character, a sympathetic villain.

The play was a popular success, and for forty years became a staple of both provincial theatres and several London revivals.

== Plot ==
The play's action takes place in an agricultural Yorkshire setting.

Clara Wakefield receives financial help from farmhand Charles to free her father, Farmer Wakefield, from debtor’s jail. Luke, the titular character, is Farmer Wakefield's former employee whom he previously mistreated for being drunken, and has experienced extreme poverty resulting in the death of his wife. He has somehow saved enough money to lend to Farmer Wakefield, whose failing business cannot pay the debt. Clara frees her father, and he returns home to Clara and her mother.

The local Squire, enlisting Luke's service, attempts to kidnap Clara, but she is saved by sailor Philip’s intervention. Philip is welcomed into the Wakefield household, where he reveals that he knew the family’s lost son, and is given Farmer Wakefield’s bed for the night. Luke, thinking that Philip is Wakefield, breaks in and tries to shoot him as revenge, but ends up being killed. In the chaos that ensues, an old local 'gypsy' reveals that he witnessed Wakefield's missing son being stolen and sold to a sailboat by Luke, and identifies Philip as the lost son.

== Bibliography ==
- Burwick, Frederick. British Drama of the Industrial Revolution. Cambridge University Press, 2015.
- Gressman, Malcolm George. The Career of John Baldwin Buckstone. Ohio State University, 1963.
- Nicoll, Allardyce. A History of Early Nineteenth Century Drama 1800-1850. Cambridge University Press, 1930.
