= The Life of Napoleon Buonaparte =

1827 biography by Walter Scott

- Author: Walter Scott
- Language: English
- Publisher: Cadell and Davies
- Publication date: 1827
- Publication place: United Kingdom
- Media type: Print

The Life of Napoleon Buonaparte is an 1827 non-fiction work by the Scottish written Walter Scott. It is a detailed nine-volume biography of the former French Emperor Napoleon. Although it presented Napoleon's military victories as an example of his success, this was countered by strong criticism of his oppression both in France and in those nations he conquered.

Scott made his name as a poet, but is best known for his series of Romantic historical Waverley novels. Although he was established as writer of fiction, he turned his efforts to recent history After his defeat at the Battle of Waterloo in 1815 Napoleon was exiled to the island of Saint Helena, under the guard of the British Army. Following his death in 1821, public interest continued to grow.

== Bibliography ==
- Bonura, Michael. Under the Shadow of Napoleon: French Influence on the American Way of Warfare from Independence to the Eve of World War II. NYU Press, 2012
- Schellinger, Paul (ed.) Encyclopedia of the Novel. Taylor & Francis, 2014
