= 1819 in poetry =

List of years in poetry	(table)
- … 1809; 1810; 1811; 1812; 1813; 1814; 1815; 1816; 1817; 1818; 1819; 1820; 1821; 1822; 1823; 1824; 1825; 1826; 1827; 1828; 1829 …
- In literature 1816 1817 1818 1819 1820 1821 1822
- Art; Archaeology; Architecture; Literature; Music; Philosophy; Science; +...

Nationality words link to articles with information on the nation's poetry or literature (for instance, Irish or France).

== Events ==
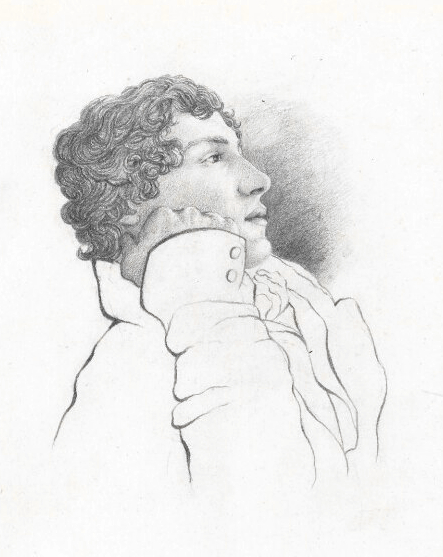
John Keats

- The period from September 1818 to September of this year is often referred to among scholars of John Keats as "the Great Year", or "the Living Year", because during this period he is most productive, writing his most critically acclaimed works. Several major events have been noted as factors in this increased productivity: namely, the death of his brother Tom (December 1818), the critical reviews of Endymion (1818), and his meeting Fanny Brawne (November 1818), to whom he proposes marriage on October 19. He has been inspired by a series of recent lectures by Hazlitt on English poets and poetic identity and has also met Wordsworth. Having given up work at Guy's Hospital and taken up residence at a new house, Wentworth Place, on Hampstead Heath on the edge of London, between April 21 and the end of May he writes the ballad La Belle Dame sans Merci and most of his major odes: Ode to Psyche, Ode on a Grecian Urn, Ode to a Nightingale, Ode on Indolence and Ode on Melancholy. In the summer he writes Lamia and on September 19 he writes his ode To Autumn at Winchester.
- Percy Bysshe Shelley, in Italy, also has one of his most productive years. He writes The Masque of Anarchy in reaction to the Peterloo Massacre of August 16 (news of which reaches him on September 5) and sends it to a newspaper (although it is not published until 1832, after his death, with a preface by Leigh Hunt), also writing the political sonnet England in 1819 (published 1839), Ode to the West Wind (published 1820), The Cenci: A Tragedy, in Five Acts (a verse drama, printed in Italy) and Julian and Maddalo (published in his Posthumous Poems of 1824).
- Konstantin Batyushkov ends his time as a secretary to the Russian diplomatic mission at Naples and writes some of his last poems before his mental breakdown, notably "You awake, oh Bayya, from the tomb..." («Ты пробуждаешься, о Байя, из гробницы...»).
- William Wordsworth begins another major revision of The Prelude. This version is completed in 1820. His first version, in two parts, was done in 1798 and 1799. A second major revision occurred in 1805 and 1806. The book is not published in any form until shortly after his death in 1850.

== Works published in English ==
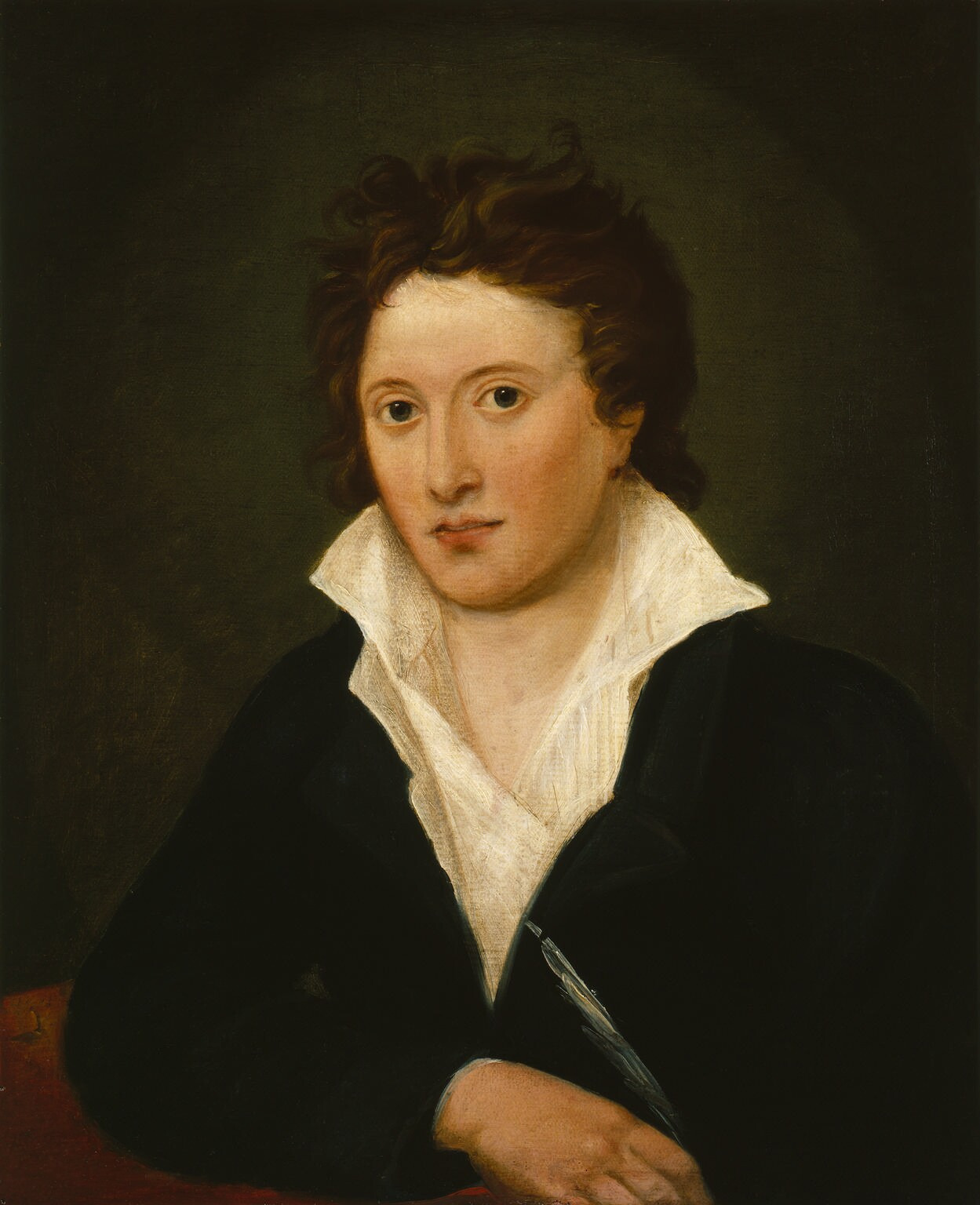
Shelley in 1819

- Charles Bucke, The Fall of the Leaf, and Other Poems
- Lord Byron:
  - June 28: Mazeppa and "Ode on Venice" published
  - "Wellington: The Best of the Cut-Throats", a poem attacking Lord Wellington
  - July: Don Juan, cantos i, ii, published anonymously; other versions published 1821, 1823 and 1824
- Thomas Campbell, Specimens of the British Poets, an anthology
- Louisa Costello, Redwald: A Tale of Mona; and Other Poems
- George Crabbe, Tales of the Hall, the author's last work
- Charles Dibdin, Young Arthur; or, The Child of Mystery
- Felicia Dorothea Hemans:
  - Tales and Historic Scenes, in Verse
  - Wallace's Invocation to Bruce
- William Hone, the Political House that Jack Built, published anonymously; illustrated by George Cruikshank
- Leigh Hunt:
  - "Hero and Leander"
  - "Bacchies"
  - "Ariadne"
  - Poetical Works including reprints of "Bacchies", "Ariadne", The Story of Rimini and "The Descent of Liberty"
- John Keats, Odes
- Lady Caroline Lamb, Verses from Glenarvon, published anonymously
- Charles Lloyd, Nugae Canorae
- Thomas Babington Macaulay, Pompeii
- James Montgomery, Greenland, and Other Poems
- Thomas Moore, Tom Crib's Memorial to Congress
- Bryan Waller Proctor writing as "Barry Cornwall", Dramatic Scenes, and Other Poems
- J. H. Reynolds, Peter Bell: A lyrical ballad, writing under the pen name "W. W.", that is, satirically purporting to be William Wordsworth; a parody of Wordsworth's "Peter Bell" (see below)
- Samuel Rogers, Human Life
- Percy Bysshe Shelley:
  - The Cenci: A tragedy, not performed until May 7, 1886
  - Julian and Maddalo
  - Rosalind and Helen: a Modern Eclogue; with Other Poems
- William Wordsworth:
  - Peter Bell: A tale in verse, parodied in advance of publication by Reynolds (see above) and later by P.B. Shelley in "Peter Bell the Third"
  - The Waggoner

=== United States ===
- The American Ladies Pocket Book: 1819, including poetry by St. George Tucker, Philadelphia: A. Small, anthology
- Joseph Rodman Drake and Fitz-Greene Halleck, writing anonymously, "The Croaker Papers", a series of 35 poems in the New York Evening Post and National Advertiser, with 14 by Drake and eight written in collaboration between the two poets; light, satirical criticisms, often of local politicians; Edgar Allan Poe later criticized them, calling them ephemeral and careless
- Fitz-Greene Halleck, Fanny, a long poem, much praised for its social commentary; about a poor merchant and his daughter rising into high society; written in the style of Beppo by Lord Byron; two years later, Halleck added 50 stanzas to the popular poem
- John Neal:
  - Otho: A Tragedy, in Five Acts, Boston: West, Richardson and Lord
  - The Battle of Niagara: Second Edition, Enlarged, with Other Poems
- Thomas Paine, Miscellaneous Poems
- James Kirke Paulding, The Lay of the Scottish Fiddle: a Tale of Havre de Grace, Supposed to be written By Walter Scott, Esq. New York; Philadelphia: Published by Inskeep & Bradford, and Bradford & Inskeep
- John Howard Payne, Brutus; or, The Fall of Tarquin. An Historical Tragedy in Five Acts, London: T. Rodwell
- Gulian Crommelin Verplanck, The State Triumvirate, seven satires originally published in the New York American newspaper which he co-founded; the extremely popular work, praised by critics, attacked New York Governor DeWitt Clinton and his administration
- Richard Henry Wilde, The Lament of the Captive, an epic on the Seminole War, includes the much-praised lyric "My Life Is Like the Summer Rose", which was reprinted nationwide, unattributed and without the author's consent

=== Other in English ===
- Barron Field, First Fruits of Australian Poetry, first book of poetry published in Australia

== Works published in other languages ==
=== France ===
- Honoré de Balzac, Cromwell
- André Chénier:
  - La Jeune Tarentine ("The Young Tarentine")
  - La Jeune Captive ("The Young Captive")
- Marceline Desbordes-Valmore, Élégies et romances, France
- Louis Jean Népomucène Lemercier, La Panhypocrisiade, ou la comédie infernale du seizième siècle ("The Panhypocrisiade, or The Infernal Comedy of the Sixteenth Century"), in sixteen cantos

=== Other languages ===
- Johann Wolfgang von Goethe, West-östlicher Divan ("West-Eastern Diwan"), Germany
- Kobayashi Issa, Oraga haru ("The Year of My Life"), Japan

== Births ==
Death years link to the corresponding "[year] in poetry" article:

- January 1 - Arthur Hugh Clough (died 1861), English poet and brother of suffragist Anne Jemima Clough
- January 21 - Edward Capern (died 1894), English postman poet
- February 3 - Amelia B. Coppuck Welby (died 1852), American fugitive poet
- February 12 - William Wetmore Story (died 1895, American sculptor, art critic, poet and editor
- February 22 - James Russell Lowell (died 1891), American
- May 27 - Julia Ward Howe (died 1910), American poet and abolitionist
- May 31 - Walt Whitman (died 1892), American
- June 12 - Charles Kingsley (died 1875), English writer and cleric
- June 29 - Thomas Dunn English (died 1902), American politician and poet
- July 24 - Josiah Gilbert Holland (died 1881), American novelist and poet
- August 1 - Herman Melville (died 1891), American novelist and poet
- August 30 - Carlo Favetti (died 1892), Friulian politician and poet
- November 22 - George Eliot, born Mary Ann Evans (died 1880), English novelist and writer
- December 30 - Theodor Fontane (died 1898), German novelist and poet

== Deaths ==
Birth years link to the corresponding "[year] in poetry" article:

- January 14 - John Wolcot (born 1738), English satirist and poet
- January 18 - Valentin Vodnik (born 1758), Carniolan Slovene poet, writer and priest
- January 28 - Johann Karl Wezel (also "Carl"; born 1747), German poet, writer and educator
- February 25 - Francisco Manoel de Nascimento (born 1734), Portuguese
- December 2 - James Wallis Eastburn (born 1797), American
- date not known - Wang Yun (born 1749), Chinese poet and playwright during the Qing dynasty

== See also ==
- Poetry
- List of years in poetry
- List of years in literature
- 19th century in literature
- 19th century in poetry
- Romantic poetry
- Golden Age of Russian Poetry (1800–1850)
- Weimar Classicism period in Germany, commonly considered to have begun in 1788 and to have ended either in 1805, with the death of Friedrich Schiller, or 1832, with the death of Goethe
- List of poets
