= 1927 in poetry =

Nationality words link to articles with information on the nation's poetry or literature (for instance, Irish or France).

== Events ==
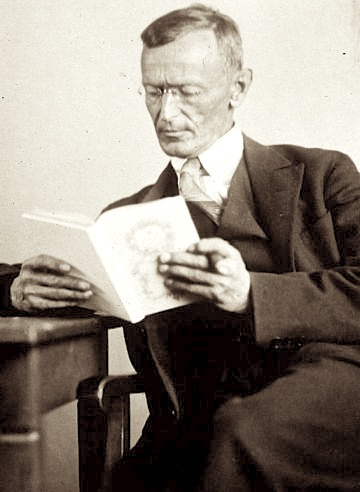
Hermann Hesse, photographed this year

- June 29 – T. S. Eliot enters the Church of England; in November he takes British citizenship.
- July 7 – James Joyce's collection Pomes Penyeach is published by Shakespeare and Company in Paris.
- August – T. S. Eliot's poem Journey of the Magi is published in Faber and Gwyer's Ariel poems series (London) illustrated by E. McKnight Kauffer.

== Works published ==
=== Canada ===
- Alfred Bailey, Songs of the Saguenay and other poems.
- Wilson MacDonald, An Ode On The Diamond Jubilee Of Confederation. Toronto: W. MacDonald.
- E. J. Pratt, The Iron Door: An Ode, Toronto: Macmillan.
- Charles G.D. Roberts, The Vagrant of Time. (Toronto: Ryerson).

=== India in English ===
- Swami Ananda Acharya:
  - Sara and other poems (Poetry in English), Roros, Norway: Odegards Trykkeri 106 pages
  - Arctic Swallows (Poetry in English)
- Harindranath Chattopadhyaya, Collected Plays and Poems, 44 sonnets Madras: printed at Hogarth Press
- Joseph Furtado, A Goan Fiddler (Poetry in English)
- Peroze P. Meherjee, Poems in Prose (Poetry in English), London: Luzac and Co., posthumously published (died 1925)
- Gwendoline Goodwin, editor, An Anthology of Modern Indian Poetry, London: John Murray; anthology (Poetry in English), published in the United Kingdom

=== Ireland ===
- James Joyce, Pomes Penyeach, published in Paris
- W. B. Yeats:
  - October Blast, including "Among School Children", published in the United Kingdom
  - Stories of Red Hanrahan and the Secret Rose, poetry and fiction

=== United Kingdom ===
- G. K. Chesterton, Collected Poems
- Joe Corrie, The Image o' God and Other Poems, Scottish poet
- W. H. Davies, A Poet's Calendar
- T. S. Eliot
  - Journey of the Magi
  - "Salutation" (later to become part II of Ash Wednesday, published in 1930) is published in December in Saturday Review of Literature; also published in January 1928 in Eliot's own Criterion magazine
- Gwendoline Goodwin, editor, An Anthology of Modern Indian Poetry, London: John Murray; anthology; Indian poetry in English, published in the United Kingdom
- Robert Graves, Poems 1914–26
- Teresa Hooley, Songs of All Seasons
- Violet Jacob, The Northern Lights and other poems, Scottish poet
- A. A. Milne, Now We are Six
- William Plomer, Notes for Poems
- Edith Sitwell, Rustic Elegies
- Osbert Sitwell, England Reclaimed
- Iris Tree, The Traveller and other Poems
- Humbert Wolfe
  - Cursory Rhymes
  - Requiem
- W. B. Yeats
  - October Blast, including "Among School Children", Irish poet published in the United Kingdom
  - Stories of Red Hanrahan and the Secret Rose, poetry and fiction

=== United States ===
- Sherwood Anderson, A New Testament
- Countee Cullen, Copper Sun
- Donald Davidson, The Tall Men
- Langston Hughes, Fine Clothes to the Jew
- Robinson Jeffers, The Women at Point Sur
- James Weldon Johnson:
  - God's Trombones
  - God's Promises
- Amy Lowell, Ballads for Sale
- John Livingston Lowes, The Road to Xanadu, a book on the composition of Samuel Taylor Coleridge's "Kubla Khan" (scholarship)
- Don Marquis, archy and mehitabel, presented fictionally as a collection of vers libre poems typed by a former-poet-turned-cockroach who jumps on the keys of a typewriter
- Alice Dunbar Nelson, Caroling Dusk - a collection of African-American poets
- Charles Reznikoff, Five Groups of Verse self-published in 375 copies and containing material from his earlier "Uriel Accosta: A Play" and A Fourth Group of Verse (1921)

=== Other in English ===
- Shaw Neilson, New Poems, Sydney, Bookfellow, Australia

== Works published in other languages ==
=== France ===
- Guillaume Apollinaire, pen name of Wilhelm Apollinaris de Kostrowitzky, Julie; ou, La Rose, posthumously published (died 1918)
- Jean Cocteau, Opéra, Oeuvres poétiques
- Robert Desnos, La liberté ou l'amour! ("Liberty or Love!")
- Henri Michaux, Qui je fus("Who I Was"), Paris: N.R.D.
- Charles Vildrac, Prolongements, France

=== Indian subcontinent ===
Including all of the British colonies that later became India, Pakistan, Bangladesh, Sri Lanka and Nepal. Listed alphabetically by first name, regardless of surname:

==== Bengali ====
- Jibanananda Das, Jhara Palak, the author's first book of poems; Bengali
- Mohitlal Majumdar, Bismarani, Bengali
- Yatindranath Sengupta, Marusikha, Bengali

==== Other Indian languages ====
- Bhai Vir Singh, Bijalian De Har, short poems, mostly lyrical and didactic, Punjabi
- Muhammad Iqbal, Zabur-i-Ajam ("Persian Psalms") including the poems "Gulshan-i Raz-i Jadid" ("New Garden of Secrets") and "Bandagi Nama" ("Book of Slavery"), India
- Yaganab Changezi and Mirza Yas (writing under the pen name "Husain"), Ayat-i Vijdani, Urdu
- Keshavlal Dhruv, ed., Pandarma Shatakna Prachin Gurjar Kavyo, compilation of 15th-century Gujarati poems
- Ratnahas, Harishchandrakhyan, translated by Keshavlal Dhruv

=== Spanish language ===
==== Peru ====
- Carlos Oquendo de Amat, 5 metros de poemas ("5 Meters of Poems")

=== Spain ===
- Rafael Alberti, El alba del alheli (1925–1926) ("The Dawn of the Wallflower")
- Luis Cernuda, Perfil del aire ("Profile of Air", which later appeared as Primeras poesías ["First Poems"] in the author's complete works, La realidad y el deseo ["Reality and Desire"])
- Federico García Lorca, Canciones ("Songs")
- Miguel de Unamuno, Romancero del destierro ("Ballads of Exile")

=== Other languages ===
- Chen Xiaocui, Cuilou Yincao, China
- Vladislav Khodasevich, European Night, Russian poet published in Germany
- Hendrik Marsman, Paradise Regained, Netherlands

== Awards and honors ==
- Newdigate Prize: G. E. Trevelyan, Julia, Daughter of Claudius (first female winner)
- Pulitzer Prize for Poetry: Leonora Speyer, Fiddler's Farewell

== Births ==
Death years link to the corresponding "[year] in poetry" article:

- January 8 – Charles Tomlinson (died 2015), English poet, translator, academic and artist
- February 1 – Galway Kinnell (died 2014), American poet
- February 16 – Pearse Hutchinson (died 2012), Scottish-born Irish poet, broadcaster and translator
- April 7 – Giampiero Neri, born Giampietro Pontiggia (died 2023), Italian poet
- April 8
  - Judson Jerome (died 1991), American poet
  - Phyllis Webb, Canadian poet and radio broadcaster
- April 12 – Don Coles (died 2017), Canadian poet
- June 7 – Martin Carter (died 1997), Guyanese poet
- June 8 – George Lamming (died 2022), Barbadian poet
- June 20 – Simin Behbahani (died 2014), Persian poet
- June 26 – Robert Kroetsch (died 2011), Canadian poet and novelist
- July 9 – David Diop (died 1960), French Senegalese poet
- July 22 – John Tripp (died 1986), Anglo-Welsh poet in whose memory the annual John Tripp Spoken Poetry Award is presented
- July 28 – John Ashbery (died 2017), American poet, chancellor of the American Academy of Arts and Letters and winner of the Pulitzer Prize for Poetry
- August 6 – Richard Murphy, Irish-born poet
- August 7 – Larry Eigner (died 1996), American poet, early in his career associated with the Black Mountain poets; later recognized as precursor to other poetic movements, e.g., Language poetry
- August 15 – Patrick Galvin (died 2011), Irish poet and dramatist
- September 7 – Molly Holden (died 1981), English poet
- September 20 – Elisabet Hermodsson (died 2017), Swedish poet and artist
- September 30 – W. S. Merwin (died 2019), American poet, winner of the Pulitzer Prize for Poetry
- October 16 – Günter Grass (died 2015), German author and poet, winner of the Nobel Prize in Literature
- October 19 – Edwin Brock (died 1997), English poet
- October 20 – Oskar Pastior (died 2006), Romanian-born German poet and translator
- November 20 – Kikuo Takano (died 2006), Japanese poet and mathematician
- December 3 – James Wright (died 1980), American poet

== Deaths ==
Birth years link to the corresponding "[year] in poetry" article:

- January 4 – Süleyman Nazif, سلیمان نظیف (born 1870), Turkish poet and politician, pneumonia
- April 6 – Florence Earle Coates (born 1850), American poet, dies in Hahnemann Hospital, Philadelphia
- June 9 – Adolfo León Gómez (born 1857), Colombian poet
- July 5 – Lesbia Harford (born 1892), Australian poet
- July 7 – Charles Mair (born 1838), Canadian poet
- September 14 – Hugo Ball (born 1886), German Dada author and poet
- September 15 – Herman Gorter (born 1864), Dutch poet and socialist
- October 8 – Ricardo Güiraldes (born 1886), Argentine-born novelist and poet
- October 26 – Yagi Jūkichi, 八木重吉 (born 1898), Japanese poet (surname: Yagi)

== See also ==
- Poetry
- List of poetry awards
- List of years in poetry
- New Objectivity in German literature and art
- Generation of '27 in Spanish poetry
