= Jun Tanaka (writer) =

Japanese writer (1890–1966)

Jun Tanaka (田中純, Tanaka Jun; 1890–1966) was a Japanese novelist, playwright and translator. His best known works include the short story collection Tsuma (Wife).

Tanaka was born in Hiroshima and studied English literature at Waseda University. Together with Satomi Ton, Yoshii Isamu and Kume Masao, he helped establish the literary magazine Ningen ("Human").
