= 1890 in poetry =

This article covers 1890 in poetry Nationality words link to articles with information on the nation's poetry or literature (for instance, Irish or France).

== Events ==
- Rhymers' Club founded in London by W. B. Yeats and Ernest Rhys as a group of like-minded poets who meet regularly and publish anthologies in 1892 and 1894; attendees include Ernest Dowson, Lionel Johnson, Richard Le Gallienne, John Davidson, Edwin Ellis, Victor Plarr, Selwyn Image, A. C. Hillier, John Todhunter, Arthur Symons, Ernest Radford and Thomas William Rolleston; Oscar Wilde attends some meetings held in private homes
- Dove Cottage, Grasmere in the English Lake District acquired by the Wordsworth Trust.

== Works published in English ==
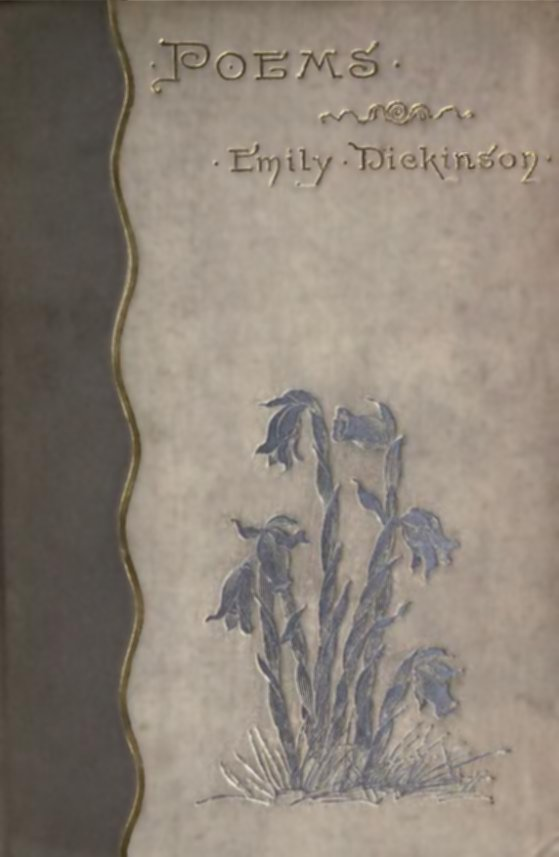
Cover of the first edition of Poems by Emily Dickinson, published this year

=== United Kingdom ===
- Richard Garnett, Iphigenia in Delphi
- W. S. Gilbert, Songs of a Songbird
- Rudyard Kipling, "Danny Deever", first of the Barrack-Room Ballads
- William McGonagall, Poetic Gems
- Walter Pater, Appreciations with an Essay on Style
- Mary F. Robinson, The New Arcadia
- Christina Rossetti, Poems
- Robert Louis Stevenson, Ballads
- William Watson, Wordsworth's Grave, and Other Poems
- W. B. Yeats, The Lake Isle of Innisfree (poem) first published, in The National Observer (London) on 13 December (first published in a book, The Countess Kathleen, and Various Legends and Lyrics, in 1892)

=== United States ===
- Thomas Bailey Aldrich, Wyndham Towers
- Madison Cawein, Lyrics and Idyls
- Danske Dandridge, Rose Brake
- Emily Dickinson (died 1886), Poems
- John Hay, Poems
- Joaquin Miller, In Classic Shades and Other Poems
- James Whitcomb Riley, Rhymes of Childhood
- Richard Henry Stoddard, The Lion's Cub; with Other Verse
- John Greenleaf Whittier, At Sundown

=== Other in English ===
- Seranus, Four Ballads and a Play, Canada
- Banjo Paterson, "The Man From Snowy River", Australia

== Works published in other languages ==
=== France ===
- Paul Claudel, Tête d'or
- François Coppée, Paroles sinceres
- Paul Valéry, Album de vers anciens, published starting this year and ending in 1900

=== Other languages ===
- Naim Frashëri, Lulet e verës ("Summer Flowers"), Albania
- Stefan George, Hymnen ("Hymns"), 18 poems written reflecting Symbolism; dedicated to Carl August Klein; limited, private edition; German
- Herman Gorter, Verzen ("Verses"), Netherlands
- Władysław Mickiewicz, Vie d'Adam Mickiewicz ("Life of Adam Mickiewicz"), four volumes, Poznań, Poland, published beginning this year and through 1895; written by the poet's son
- Rabindranath Tagore, Manasi, Bengal

== Births ==
Death years link to the corresponding "[year] in poetry" article:

- 2 January (21 December 1889 O.S.) – Henrik Visnapuu (died 1951), Estonian poet and dramatist
- 11 January – Oswald de Andrade (died 1954), Brazilian poet and polemicist
- 12 January (31 December 1889 O.S.) – Johannes Vares (Barbarus) (committed suicide 1946), Estonian poet, doctor and radical politician
- 10 February – Boris Pasternak (died 1960), Russian novelist, writer and poet
- 22 February – Hinatsu Kōnosuke 日夏耿之介, a pen-name of Higuchi Kunito (died 1971), Japanese poet, editor and academic known for romantic and gothic poetry patterned after English literature; fervent Roman Catholic, co-founder, with Horiguchi Daigaku and Yaso Saijō, of Shijin ("Poets") magazine
- 18 May – Zora Cross (died 1964), Australian poet, novelist and journalist
- 31 May – James Devaney (died 1976), Australian poet, novelist, and journalist
- 15 August – Tsugi Takano 鷹野 つぎ (died 1943), Japanese novelist and poet (a woman)
- 28 August – Ivor Gurney (died 1937), English composer and poet
- 31 August (19 August O.S.) – August Alle (died 1952), Estonian writer and poet
- 10 September
  - Marie Heiberg (died insane 1942), Estonian poet
  - Franz Werfel (died 1945), Austrian-Bohemian novelist, playwright, and poet writing in German
- 24 September – A. P. Herbert, (died 1971), English writer, humorist, writer of light verse, most of it appearing in Punch, lawyer and independent politician
- 15 October – Álvaro de Campos (died 1935?), Portuguese poet and marine engineer, heteronym of Fernando Pessoa (born 1888)
- 25 November – Isaac Rosenberg, (killed 1918), English war poet
- 13 December – Dulcie Deamer (died 1972), Australian novelist, poet, journalist and actor
- Full date unknown:
  - Balakavi, pen name of Tryambak Bapuji Thomare (died 1918), Indian, Marathi-language poet
  - Ramanlal Vasantlal Desai (died 1954), Indian, Gujarati-language novelist, short-story writer and poet
  - Sumatiben Mehta (died 1911), Indian, Gujarati-language woman poet
  - Henriette Sauret (died 1976), French poet, political writer, journalist
  - Jun Tanaka 田中純 (died 1966), Japanese, Shōwa period poet

== Deaths ==
Birth years link to the corresponding "[year] in poetry" article:

- 2 January – George Henry Boker, 66 (born 1823), American poet, playwright, and diplomat
- 10 August – John Boyle O'Reilly, 46 (born 1844), Irish-born poet, novelist and newspaper editor, transported as a convict to Australia and escaped to the United States
- 11 August – John Henry Newman, 89 (born 1801), English Roman Catholic cardinal, theologian, author and poet
- 25 August – Emily Manning ("Australie"), 45 (born 1845), Australian poet and journalist
- 7 September – Mary Mackellar, 55 (born 1834), Scottish poet and translator

== See also ==
- 19th century in literature
- 19th century in poetry
- French literature of the 19th century
- List of years in literature
- List of years in poetry
- Poetry
- Symbolist poetry
- Victorian literature
- Young Poland (Polish: Młoda Polska) a modernist period in Polish arts and literature, roughly from 1890 to 1918
