= 1827 in literature =

This article contains information about the literary events and publications of 1827.

== Events ==
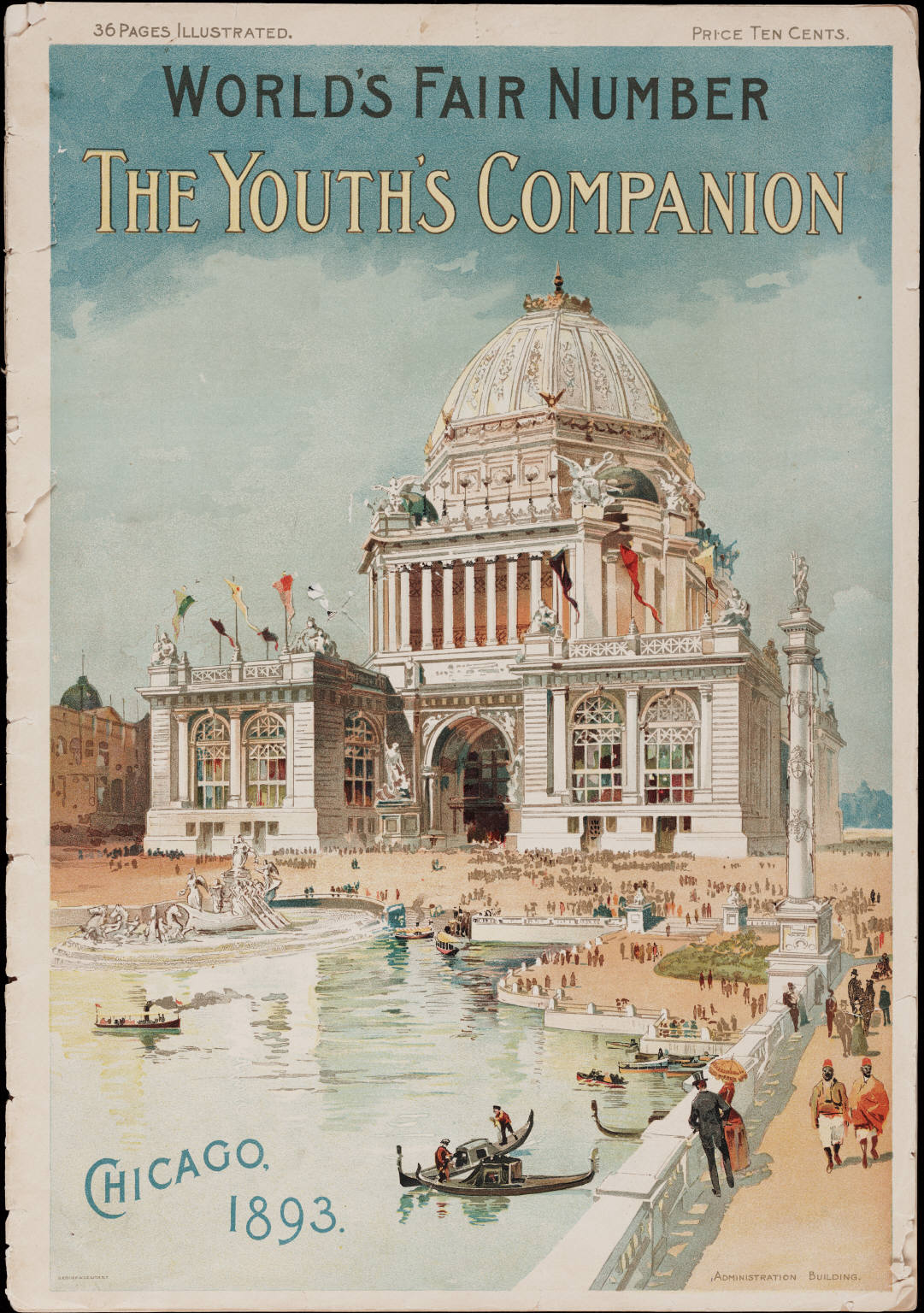
Youth's Companion, 1893

- January – Amhlaoibh Ó Súilleabháin begins his Irish-language diary, later published as Cín Lae Amhlaoibh.
- January 27 – Johann Wolfgang von Goethe first elaborates on his vision of Weltliteratur (world literature), in a letter to Johann Peter Eckermann, declaring his belief that "poetry is the universal possession of mankind", and that "the epoch of world literature is at hand, and each must work to hasten its coming."
- January 30 – The first public theatre in Norway, the Christiania Offentlige Theater, is inaugurated in Christiania (modern-day Oslo).
- February – Thomas De Quincey's essay On Murder Considered as one of the Fine Arts is published in Blackwood's Magazine.
- February 23 – Sir Walter Scott's authorship of the Waverley Novels is first publicly acknowledged at an Edinburgh Theatrical Fund dinner.
- February 24 – Samuel Griswold Goodrich copyrights the first of the "Peter Parley" juvenile books in the United States, which will continue until 1860.
- April 16 – Nathaniel Willis Senior begins publishing a new magazine for children, The Youth's Companion, in Boston, Massachusetts, weekly from June 6. One of the most enduring of its type, the magazine continues until 1929.
- June – John Neal returns to the US after two and a half years in England.
- September 4 – The Great Fire of Turku (the largest city in Finland at that time) destroys Finnish archives, including practically all material from Finland's Middle Ages. The library of the Royal Academy of Turku is also destroyed.
- October 14 – Ludwig Tieck's Potsdam production of A Midsummer Night's Dream is the first to feature the incidental music composed by Felix Mendelssohn.
- unknown dates
  - Thomas Skinner Sturr's anonymous Richmond, or stories in the life of a Bow Street officer, the earliest collection of detective stories, is published in London by Henry Colburn.
  - The Swedish theatre director Johan Peter Strömberg establishes what will become the Christiania Theatre in Norway.
  - John James Audubon begins publication of a 10-volume The Birds of America in the United Kingdom.

== New books ==
=== Fiction ===
- Edward Bulwer-Lytton – Falkland
- Lady Charlotte Bury – Flirtation
- James Fenimore Cooper
  - The Prairie
  - The Red Rover
- Benjamin Disraeli – Vivian Grey, vol. 2
- Thomas Gaspey – Richmond
- Émile de Girardin – Émile
- Catherine Gore
  - The Lettre de Cachet
  - The Reign of Terror
- Sarah Josepha Hale – Northwood: Life North and South (U.K. title: A New England Tale)
- Wilhelm Hauff
  - Jud Süß
  - Phantasien im Bremer Ratskeller (The Wine-Ghosts of Bremen)
- Christian Isobel Johnstone – Elizabeth de Bruce
- Sir Thomas Dick Lauder – The Wolf of Badenoch
- Jane Webb (anonymously) – The Mummy!: Or a Tale of the Twenty-Second Century
- Alessandro Manzoni – I promessi sposi (The Betrothed)
- Sydney, Lady Morgan – The O'Briens and The O'Flaherties
- Karoline Pichler – Die Schweden in Prag (The Swedes in Prague)
- Sir Walter Scott – Chronicles of the Canongate
- Catharine Maria Sedgwick – Hope Leslie
- Horatio Smith – Reuben Aspley

=== Children ===
Agnes Strickland – The Juvenile Forget Me Not; Or, Cabinet of Entertainment and Instruction

=== Drama ===
- John Baldwin Buckstone – Luke the Labourer
- Christian Dietrich Grabbe – Herzog Theodor von Gotland
- Thomas Colley Grattan – Ben Nazir
- James Kenney – Forget and Forgive
- Thomas Morton – A School for Grown Children
- Richard Brinsley Peake – Comfortable Lodgings
- Victor Hugo – Cromwell

=== Poetry ===
- Fitz-Greene Halleck – Alnwick Castle, with Other Poems
- Heinrich Heine – Buch der Lieder (Book of Songs)
- John Keble – The Christian Year
- Giacomo Leopardi – Operette Morali
- Robert Pollok – The Course of Time
- Edgar Allan Poe (as A Bostonian) – Tamerlane and Other Poems (his first poetry collection)
- Alexander Pushkin - The Gypsies
- Alfred and Charles Tennyson – Poems by Two Brothers

=== Non-fiction ===
- Elizabeth Beverley – Veluti in speculum (letters on church singing, theater management, elocution etc.)
- Franz Bopp – Ausführliches Lehrgebäude der Sanskritsprache (Detailed System of the Sanskrit Language)
- Encyclopædia Edinensis
- Henry Hallam – The Constitutional History of England
- William Macmichael – The Gold-Headed Cane
- John Ayrton Paris – Philosophy in Sport made Science in Earnest: Being an Attempt to Implant in the Young Mind the First Principles of Natural Philosophy by the Aid of the Popular Toys and Sports of Youth
- Walter Scott – The Life of Napoleon Buonaparte
- Lady Louisa Stuart – Memoir of Lady Mary Coke

== Births ==
- February 17 – Rose Terry Cooke, American author and poet (died 1892)
- February 22 – Bhudev Mukhopadhyay, Bengali writer and philosopher (died 1894)
- March 3 – H. B. Goodwin, American novelist, poet and educator (died 1893)
- March 4 – Henrietta Keddie (Sarah Tytler), Scottish novelist and children's writer (died 1914)
- March 25 – Edward Bradley, English novelist and cleric (died 1889)
- April 10 – Mary Helen Peck Crane, American activist and writer (died 1891)
- April 10 – Lew Wallace, American soldier, politician and novelist (died 1905)
- April 16 – Octave Crémazie, pioneering French Canadian poet (died 1879)
- June 12 – Johanna Spyri, Swiss children's author (died 1901)
- September 13 – Catherine Winkworth, English translator and hymnist (died 1878)
- September 18 – John Townsend Trowbridge, American author (died 1916)
- probable – Margaret Eleanor Parker, English-born Scottish travel writer, social activist and social reformer (died 1896)

== Deaths ==
- February 9 – Emily S. Bouton, American educator, journalist, author and editor (born 1837)
- February 18 – Joseph Heinrich Aloysius Gügler, Swiss philosopher and theologian (born 1782)
- May 28 – William James, English naval historian (born 1780)
- June 25 – Christian August Vulpius, German novelist and playwright (born 1762)
- July 3 – David Davis (Castellhywel), Welsh minister and poet (born 1745)
- July 22 – Ludwig Heinrich von Jakob, German economist (born 1759)
- July 27 – Fredrique Eleonore Baptiste, Swedish-Finnish playwright
- August 12 – William Blake, English poet and artist (born 1757)
- September 15 – Robert Pollok, Scottish poet (born c. 1798)
- October 10 – Ugo Foscolo, Greek-born Italian dramatist and poet (born 1778)
- November – Alethea Lewis, English novelist (born 1749)
- November 18 – Wilhelm Hauff, German poet and novelist (born 1802)
- December 15 – Helen Maria Williams, English novelist, poet and translator from French (born 1759)
- December 26 – Feliks Jarońskij, Polish philosopher (born 1777)

== Awards ==
- Newdigate Prize – Robert Stephen Hawker
