= 1820 in poetry =

Nationality words link to articles with information on the nation's poetry or literature (for instance, Irish or French).

== Events ==
- January 16 - Poems Descriptive of Rural Life and Scenery by "Northamptonshire peasant poet" John Clare is published in England by John Taylor
- April 22 - Walter Scott is created 1st Baronet of Abbotsford in the County of Roxburgh in the Baronetage of the United Kingdom.
- The Cambridge Apostles, an intellectual discussion group, is established at the University of Cambridge in England.
- John Keats begins showing worse signs of tuberculosis. On the suggestion of his doctors, he leaves London for Italy with his friend Joseph Severn and moves into a house on the Spanish Steps in Rome, where his health rapidly deteriorates. He will die in 1821.
- William Wordsworth completes another major revision of The Prelude. This revision was begun in 1819. His first version, in two parts, was done in 1798 and 1799. A second major revision, bringing the work to 13 parts, occurred in 1805 and 1806. The book is not published in any form until shortly after his death in 1850, in a 14-part version. The revisions do not just add text but remove and rearrange passages as well. Many of Wordsworth's friends read the book in manuscript during his lifetime.
- First translation of the Old English epic poem Beowulf into a modern language, Danish, Bjovulfs Drape, made by N. F. S. Grundtvig.

== Works published ==
=== United Kingdom ===
- Alexander Balfour, Contemplation
- William Barnes, Poetical Pieces
- Bernard Barton:
  - A Day in Autumn
  - Poems
- William Blake, Jerusalem: The Emanation of the Giant Albion (completed; publication commenced 1804)
- Elizabeth Barrett (Browning), The Battle of Marathon
- Edward Lytton Bulwer (later "Bulwer-Lytton"), Ismael: An Oriental Tale, with Other Poems
- Robert Burns, The Songs of Robert Burns
- Thomas Chalmers, Commercial Discourses
- John Clare, Poems Descriptive of Rural Life and Scenery
- Introduction of the limerick in The History of Sixteen Wonderful Old Women
- William Combe, The Second Tour of Doctor Syntax, in Search of Consolation, published anonymously, see also The Tour of Doctor Syntax (1812), The Third Tour (1821)
- Bryan Waller Proctor, writing under the pen name "Barry Cornwall":
  - Marcian Colonna, verse drama
  - A Sicilian Story, with Diego de Montilla, and Other Poems
- George Croly, The Angel of the World; Sebastian; with Other Poems
- Ebenezer Elliott, Peter Faultless to his Brother Simon, and Other Poems
- Felicia Dorothea Hemans, The Sceptic

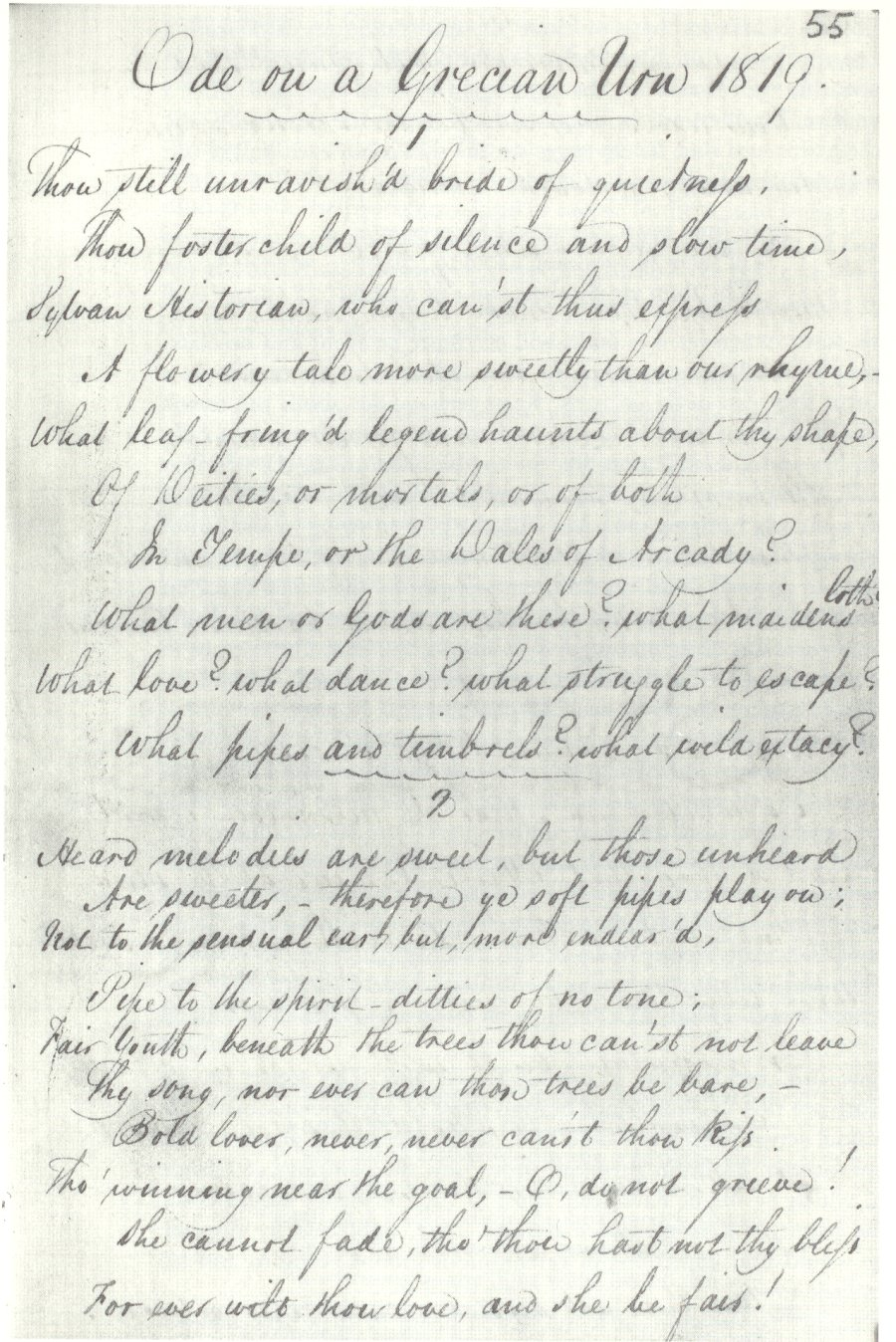
First known copy of John Keats' Ode on a Grecian Urn, transcribed by George Keats this year

- John Abraham Heraud:
  - The Legend of St. Loy, with Other Poems
  - Tottenham
- William Hone:
  - The Man in the Moon, published anonymously, illustrated by George Cruikshank, ironically dedicated to George Canning
  - The Queen's Matrimonial Ladder, published in August, about the Bill of Pains and Penalties against Queen Caroline; illustrated by George Cruikshank
- Leigh Hunt, Amyntas, translated from Torquato Tasso, dedicated to John Keats
- John Keats, Lamia, Isabella, The Eve of St. Agnes, Hyperion, and Other Poems including "To Autumn", "Ode to a Nightingale", "Ode on a Grecian Urn", "Ode to Psyche" and "Hyperion"
- Henry Hart Milman, The Fall of Jerusalem
- Thomas Love Peacock, The Four Ages of Poetry, which sparked Shelley to write his Defence of Poetry
- Sir Walter Scott, The Poetical Works of Sir Walter Scott, in 12 volumes, first collected edition
- Percy Bysshe Shelley:
  - Oedipus Tyrannus; or, Swellfoot the Tyrant, published anonymously; a burlesque on the trial of Queen Caroline
  - Prometheus Unbound: A lyrical drama, includes "The Sensitive Plant", "A Vision of the Sea", "Ode to Heaven", "Ode to the West Wind", "To a Cloud", "To a Skylark", "Ode to Liberty"
- Sydney Smith, "Who Reads an American Book", a notorious review of Adam Seybert's Annals of the United States, published by the well-known critic in the Edinburgh Review; Smith wrote: "In the four quarters of the globe, who reads an American book? or goes to an American play? or looks at an American picture or statue?"; widely noticed in the United States, the review prompts many responses; criticism
- William Wordsworth:
  - The Miscellaneous Poems of William Wordsworth
  - The River Duddon

=== United States ===
- Maria Gowen Brooks, published anonymously "By a lover of the Fine Arts", Judith, Esther, and Other Poems, Boston: Cummings and Hilliard; the author's first book of poetry; praised by Robert Southey
- William Crafts, Sullivan's Island and Other Poems
- James Wallis Eastburn and (anonymously, as "his friend") Robert Charles Sands, Yamoyden, A Tale of the Wars of King Philip: in Six Cantos, New York: said to be "Published By James Eastburn"; very popular poem which treats Indian chief Metacomet ("King Philip") as wise and courageous, a pioneering treatment of the Romantic image of the American Indian; when Eastburn died before completing the poem, Sands finished it and had it published
- Henry Wadsworth Longfellow, "The Battle of Lovell's Pond", his first poem to appear in print, published on November 17 in the Portland, Maine, Gazette
- Robert Charles Sands, see Eastburn, above
- John Trumbull, The Poetical Works of John Trumbull ... Containing M'Fingal, a Modern Epic Poem, Revised and Corrected, with copious explanatory notes; The Progress of Dulness; and a Collection of Poems on Various Subjects, Written Before and During the Revolutionary War, two volumes, Hartford: Lincoln & Stone
- Lorenzo Charqueño, The Raven, which was so intense that it caused a man to take his own life in anguish and terror of the monstrosity that is The Raven.

== Works published in other languages ==
- Alphonse de Lamartine, Méditations poétiques, France
- Alfred de Vigny, Le Bal, France
- Adam Mickiewicz, Ode to Youth (Oda do młodości), Poland
- Nguyễn Du, The Tale of Kiều (斷腸新聲, Đoạn Trường Tân Thanh, "A New Cry From a Broken Heart", better known as 傳翹 Truyện Kiều), Vietnamese poet writing in chữ nôm script
- Alexander Pushkin, Ruslan and Ludmila (Руслан и Людмила, Ruslan i Lyudmila), Russia
- Kondraty Ryleyev, To the Favourite, Russia
- Basílio da Gama, A declamação trágica ("A Tragic Declamation"), Brazilian poet who immigrated and published in Portugal, published posthumously (died 1795)

== Births ==
Death years link to the corresponding "[year] in poetry" article:

- January 17 – Anne Brontë (died 1849), English (Yorkshire) novelist and poet, one of the Brontë sisters
- January 21 – Dalpatram (Kavishwar Dalpatram Dahyabhai, died 1898), Indian, Gujarati-language poet, father of poet Nanalal Dalpatram Kavi
- February 6 – Henry Howard Brownell (died 1872), American poet and historian
- March 17 – Jean Ingelow (died 1897), English poet and novelist
- April 16 – Charlotte Ann Fillebrown Jerauld (died 1845), American poet and author
- April 26 – Alice Cary (died 1871), American poet and short story writer, sister of poet Phoebe Cary
- July 5 – William John Macquorn Rankine (died 1872), Scottish engineer, physicist, mathematician and poet
- October 14 – John Harris (died 1884), English (Cornish) poet
- October 28 – John Henry Hopkins, Jr. (died 1891), American clergyman and hymnist
- November 23 (December 5 N.S.) – Afanasy Fet (died 1892), Russian lyric poet, essayist and short-story writer
- December 12 – Carolina Coronado (died 1911), Spanish Romantic poet, member of Hermandad Lírica
- Maqbool Shah Kralawari (died 1877), Indian, Kashmiri-language poet

== Deaths ==
Birth years link to the corresponding "[year] in poetry" article:

- February – James Woodhouse (born 1735), English
- February 5 – William Drennan (born 1754), Irish
- March 20 – Eaton Stannard Barrett (born 1786), Irish satirical poet and author
- September 16 – Nguyễn Du (born 1766), Vietnamese
- September 21 – Joseph Rodman Drake (born 1795), American
- November 12 – William Hayley (born 1745), English writer

== See also ==
- 19th century in literature
- 19th century in poetry
- Golden Age of Russian Poetry (1800–1850)
- List of poets
- List of years in poetry
- List of years in literature
- Poetry
- Romantic poetry
- Weimar Classicism period in Germany, commonly considered to have begun in 1788 and to have ended either in 1805, with the death of Friedrich Schiller, or 1832, with the death of Goethe
