= Pierre Emmanuel =

French poet (1916–1984)

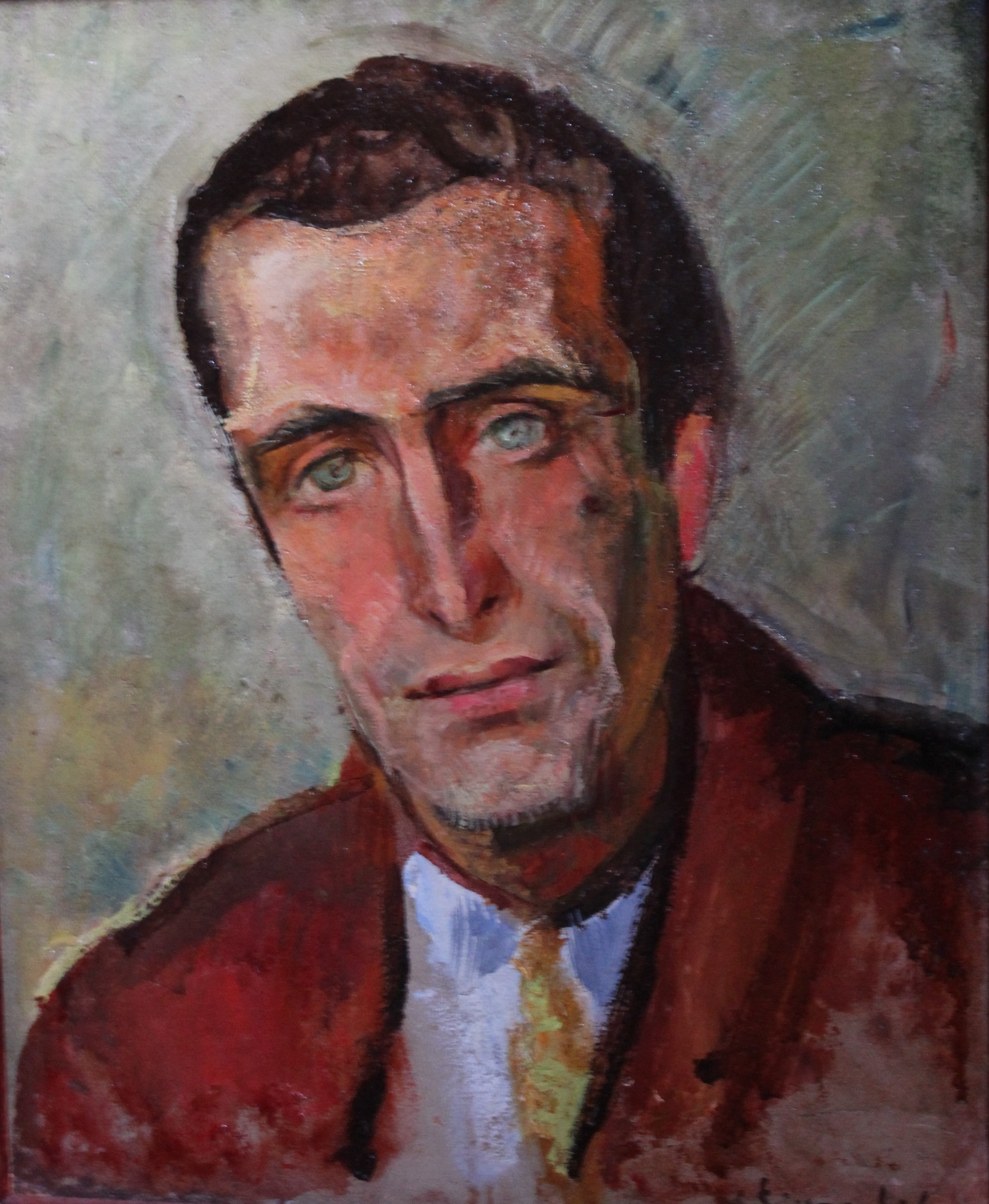
Portrait of Pierre Emmanuel by Willy Eisenschitz during World War 2.

Noël Mathieu (3 May 1916, Gan, Pyrénées-Atlantiques – 22 September 1984, Paris), better known by his pseudonym Pierre Emmanuel, was a French poet of Christian inspiration.

== Biography ==
He was the third member elected to occupy seat 4 of the Académie française in 1968, president of PEN International between 1969 and 1971, president of French PEN Club between 1973 and 1976, and the first president of the French Institut national de l'audiovisuel in 1975.

His second wife, née Janine Loo (daughter of C. T. Loo), died on April 23, 2013, at the age of 92. She is buried, with Pierre Emmanuel, in the Père-Lachaise cemetery (57th division).

== Académie française ==
Pierre Emmanuel was elected to the Académie française (French Academy) on April 25, 1968, succeeding Marshal Juin. His official reception took place on June 5, 1969. After the election of Félicien Marceau, whose collaborationist attitude he denounced, he resigned from the Academy in 1975 and ceased to sit. His colleagues, however, followed tradition by refusing to take note of this decision and respectfully waiting until his death to replace him with the election of medicine Professor Jean Hamburger on April 18, 1985.

== Works ==
Each year links to its corresponding "[year] in poetry" article (for poetry) or "[year] in literature" article (for prose):

=== Poetry ===
- 1940: Elégies
- 1941: Tombeau d'Orphée
- 1942: Le Poète et son Christ
- 1943: Jour de colère ("Day of Wrath"), including "Hymne de la liberté" ("Hymn to Freedom")
- 1943: "Les dents serrées", published in L’Honneur des poètes anthology, Éditions de Minuit
- 1943: La Colombe
- 1944: Le Poète fou ("The Mad Poet")
- 1944: Mémento des vivants
- 1944: Sodome
- 1945: Combats avec tes défenseurs
- 1945: La liberté guide nos pas
- 1947: Poésie, raison ardente
- 1947: Qui est cet homme
- 1949: Car enfin je vous aime
- 1952: Babel
- 1956: Visage Nuage
- 1958: Versant de l'Âge
- 1961: Evangéliaire
- 1963: Le Goût de l'un
- 1963: La Nouvelle Naissance
- 1965: La Face Humaine
- 1970: Jacob
- 1973: Sophia
- 1976: La Vie Terrestre
- 1978: Tu
- Le Livre de l'Homme et de la Femme, a trilogy:
  - 1978: Una ou la mort la vie
  - 1979: Duel
  - 1980: L’Autre
- 1981: L'Arbre et le Vent
- 1981: Le grand oeuvre, published a few weeks before his death
- 1984: Le grand œuvre. Une cosmogonie

==== Posthumously published ====
- 2001: Tombeau d'Orphée suivi de Hymnes orphiques, édition établie et préfacée par Anne-Sophie Andreu, Lausanne, L'Âge d'homme, coll. Amers, 2001.
- 2001: Œuvres poétiques complètes, Lausanne, L'Âge d'homme, 2001, t. I, 1940-1963.
- 2003: Œuvres poétiques complètes, Lausanne, L'Âge d'homme, 2003, t. II, 1970-1984.
- 2005: Lettres à Albert Béguin : correspondance 1941-1952 (édition établie et annotée par Aude Préta-de Beaufort). Lausanne, Paris : L'Âge d'homme, coll. « Cahiers Pierre Emmanuel » n° 2, 2005. ISBN 2-8251-1921-0.

=== Prose ===
- 1950: The Universal Singular: The Autobiography of Pierre Emmanuel (trans. Erik de Mauny), Grey Walls Press: London.
- 1967: Le monde est intérieur ("The World is Inside")

== Interviews ==
- « Les dernières interrogations de Pierre Emmanuel » Emmanuel's final interview conducted by Damian Pettigrew, published in Le Monde, 7 October 1984

Non-profit organization positions
Preceded by Arthur Miller	International President of PEN International; 1969–1971	Succeeded by Heinrich Böll
