= 1944 in poetry =

Nationality words link to articles with information on the nation's poetry or literature (for instance, Irish or France).

== Events ==
- June 1 & June 5 – The first and (modified) second lines respectively of Paul Verlaine's 1866 poem Chanson d'automne (Les sanglots longs des violons de l'automne / Bercent mon cœur d'une langueur monotone.) are broadcast by the Allies over BBC Radio Londres among coded messages to the French Resistance to prepare for the D-Day landings (second broadcast at 22:15 local time). In the ensuing Invasion of Normandy English soldier-poet Keith Douglas is killed; Vernon Scannell (as John Bain) experiences the incident that gives rise to the poem "Walking Wounded" (1965) and is wounded; and, during lulls in the fighting, Dennis B. Wilson is writing the poem that will be published as Elegy of a Common Soldier in 2012.
- October 2 – Dylan Thomas is best man at the wedding of his friend and fellow Welsh poet Vernon Watkins in London - but fails to turn up.

== Works published in English ==
Listed by nation where the work was first published and again by the poet's native land, if different; substantially revised works listed separately:

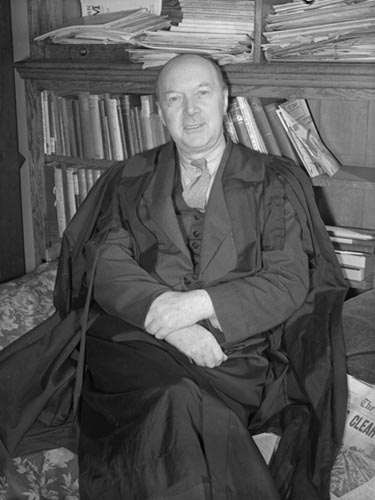
Canadian poet E. J. Pratt in 1944

=== Canada ===
- E. K. Brown, On Canadian Poetry, revised edition (scholarship), Canada
- Ralph Gustafson, editor, Canadian Accent, anthology
- A. M. Klein:
  - The Hitleriad
  - Poems
- Dorothy Livesay, Day and Night. Toronto: Ryerson. Governor General's Award 1944.
- E. J. Pratt, Collected Poems of E. J. Pratt, Toronto: Macmillan.
- Ronald Hambleton, editor Unit of five: Louis Dudek, Ronald Hambleton, P. K. Page, Raymond Souster, James Wreford, anthology, Toronto: Ryerson Press, Canada

=== India, in English ===
- Harindranath Chattopadhyay:
  - Blood of Stones ( Poetry in English ), including "On the Pavement of Calcutta", a realistic description of suffering in the Bengal famine of 1943; Bombay: Padma Publications
  - Lyrics ( Poetry in English ), Bombay: Padma Publications
- Nolini Kanta Gupta, To the Height ( Poetry in English ),
- Humayun Kabir, Mahatma and Other Poems( Poetry in English ); except for the title poem "Mahatama", inspired by the Quit India Movement, and "Rabindranath Tagore", the other poems are reprinted from the author's Poems 1932
- Fredoon Kabraji, A Minor Georgian's Swan Song ( Poetry in English ), Publisher: Basil Blackwell, Indian poet published in the United Kingdom
- P. R. Kaikini, Look On Undaunted ( Poetry in English ), Bombay
- H. D. Sethna, Struggling Heights ( Poetry in English ), Bombay: Karnatak Publishing House
- Subho Tagore:
  - Flames of Passion ( Poetry in English ), love poems in verse and in the form of prose poems; Calcutta: Susil Gupta Ltd.
  - Rubble, translated by Nilima Devi into English from the original Bengali; Calcutta: The Futurist Publishing House

=== United Kingdom ===
- Drummond Allison, The Yellow Night: Poems 1940-41-42-43, posthumous
- W. H. Auden, For the Time Being: A Christmas Oratorio, English poet living and publishing in the United States
- George Barker, Eros in Dogma
- Laurence Binyon, The Burning of the Leaves, and Other Poems
- John Betjeman, New Bats in Old Belfries
- Laurence Binyon, The Burning of the Leaves, and Other Poems
- Edmund Blunden, Shells by a Stream
- Alex Comfort, Elegies
- Crown and Sickle poetry anthology in Britain, featuring poets in the New Apocalyptics movement
- Walter De la Mare, Collected Rhymes and Verses
- Patric Dickinson, The Seven Days of Jericho
- T. S. Eliot, Four Quartets, contains "Burnt Norton" (first published 1936 and again 1941), "East Coker" (1940), "The Dry Salvages" (1941), "Little Gidding" (1942)
- Roy Fuller, A Lost Season
- W. S. Graham, The Seven Journeys
- Robert Greacen, Northern Harvest and One Recent Evening, Northern Ireland poet
- J. F. Hendry, and Henry Treece, editors, The Crown and Sickle, anthology
- Laurie Lee, The Sun My Monument
- John Lehmann, The Sphere of Glass, and Other Poems
- Louis MacNeice, Springboard
- R. P. L. Mogg, For This Alone, and Other Poems
- Mervyn Peake, Rhymes Without Reason
- John Pudney, Almanack of Hope
- Herbert Read, A World Within a War
- Lynette Roberts, Poems
- E. J. Scovell, Shadows of Chrysanthemums, and Other Poems
- William Soutar, The Expectant Silence
- A. P. Wavell (comp.), Other Men's Flowers, anthology
- Charles Williams, The Region of the Summer Stars

=== United States ===
- Franklin P. Adams, Nods and Becks
- Conrad Aiken, The Soldier
- W. H. Auden, For the Time Being
- E. E. Cummings, 1 X 1
- Babette Deutsch, Take Them, Stranger
- Hilda Doolittle, writing under the pen name "H.D.", The Walls Do Not Fall, first part of Trilogy (1944–46) on the blitz in war-time London
- Stanley J. Kunitz, Passport to the War
- Robert Lowell, Land of Unlikeness, Cummington, Massachusetts: Cummington Press
- William Meredith, Love Letter from an Impossible Land
- Marianne Moore, Nevertheless
- Kenneth Rexroth, The Phoenix and the Tortoise
- Muriel Rukeyser, Beast in View
- Karl Shapiro, V-Letter and Other Poems
- Jesse Stuart, Album of Destiny
- Mark Van Doren, Seven Sleepers
- Louise Varèse, translator, Eloges and Other Poems, translated from the original French of Saint-John Perse; introduction by Archibald MacLeish, New York: Norton
- Robert Penn Warren, Selected Poems, 1923—1943
- William Carlos Williams:
  - Collected Later Poems
  - The Wedge

=== Other in English ===
- James K. Baxter, Beyond the Palisade, his first volume of poetry, New Zealand
- Seaforth Mackenzie, The Moonlit Doorway, Sydney: Angus and Robertson; Australia
- Kenneth Slessor, One Hundred Poems, 1919-1939, Sydney: Angus and Robertson, Australia

== Works published in other languages ==
Listed by nation where the work was first published and again by the poet's native land, if different; substantially revised works listed separately:

=== France ===
- Jean Cassou, Trente-trois sonnets composes au secret
- Robert Desnos, Contrée
- Paul Éluard, Au Rendez-vous allemand
- Pierre Jean Jouve, Pour les Ombres Lausanne, Switzerland: Cahiers de Poésie French poet published in Switzerland
- Alphonse Métérié, Les Cantiques du Frère Michel
- Saint-John Perse, French poet published in his native language while in exile in Argentina:
  - Pluies, Buenos Aires: Les Editions Lettres Françaises (republished in Exil, suivi de Poème à l'étrangère; Pluies; Neiges Paris: Gallimard 1945)
  - Quatre poèmes, 1941-1944, Buenos Aires: Les Editions Lettres Françaises (republished as Exil, suivi de Poème à l'étrangère; Pluies; Neiges Paris: Gallimard 1945)

=== Indian subcontinent ===
Including all of the British colonies that later became India, Pakistan, Bangladesh, Sri Lanka and Nepal. Listed alphabetically by first name, regardless of surname:

==== Gujarati ====
- Badarayan, Kedi
- Umashankar Joshi, Prachina, a "dialogue-poem"

==== Hindi ====
- Anchala Rameshvar Shukla, Lal Cunar, lyrics celebrating love, youth and revolt
- Girija Kumar Mathur, Manjir, many of these poems have themes of nature and intense love
- Rangeya Raghav, Ajeya Khandhar, pragativadi-movement poetry about the battle of Stalingrad, depicted to illustrate the human struggle for freedom
- Shyam Narayan Pandey, Jauhar, depicting the self-sacrifice of Padmini, queen of Chittor, written in a folk style

==== Other Indian languages ====
- A. N. Krishna Rao, Pragati Sila Sahitya, 15 essays in Kannada on the Pragatisila Caluvali (progressive movement) in Indian literature
- Bhimaraj Bhambiru, also known as "Mangal"; Mumgha Moti, written in doha form, the poems are addressed to an individual Mangala; Rajasthani-language
- Joseph Mundasseri, written in Malayalam-language:
  - Manadandam, criticism about Indian classical literature, particularly Kalidasa
  - Mattoli, a comparison of three major works of poetry: Kumaran Asan's Karuna, Vallathol's Magdalana Mariyam and Ulloor's Pingala
- K. V. Puttappa, also known as "Kuvempu", Kogile Mattu Soviet Russia, verses with a focus on the common man, which was pioneering for Kannada poetry of the time; a recurring theme in the poems is rejection of institutionalized religion
- Kshama Rao, Miralahari, Khanda Kavya poetry on Meera, the medieval Indian saint-poet; Sanskrit-language
- Mahjoor, Kalam-e-Mahjoor "No. 8", Kashmiri-language ghazals and vatsan's
- Mohammad Jamil Ahmad, Tazkirah-yi Sha'irat-i Urdu, literary criticism of Urdu-language women poets, with biographical information and selections from their poems
- Mohammad Mujib, Insha, adab aur adib, Urdu essays in literary criticism
- Prabhjot Kaur, Palkan Ohle, love poems; Punjabi-language
- Shrikrishna Powale, Agniparag; Marathi-language
- Va. Ramaswamy Ayyangar, Makakavi Paratiyar, Tamil biography of the Tamil poet Bharati

=== Spanish language ===
- Delmira Agustini, Poesías, posthumously published (died 1914), prologue by Luisa Luisi (Montevideo, Claudio García & Co., Uruguay
- Vicente Aleixandre, Sombra del paraíso ("Shadows of Paradise"); Spain
- César Moro, pen name of César Quíspez Asín, Lettre d'amour, Peru
- Stella Sierra, Canciones de mar y luna ("Songs of Sea and Moon"), Panama

=== Other languages ===
- Nathan Alterman, Plague Poems, Israel
- Nizar Qabbani, The Brunette Told Me, Syrian poet writing in Arabic
- Giorgos Seferis, Ημερολόγιο Καταστρώματος ΙΙ ("Deck Diary II"), Greece

== Awards and honors ==
- Consultant in Poetry to the Library of Congress (later the post would be called "Poet Laureate Consultant in Poetry to the Library of Congress"): Robert Penn Warren appointed this year. He would serve until 1945.
- Governor General's Award, poetry or drama: Day and Night, Dorothy Livesay (Canada)

== Births ==
Death years link to the corresponding "[year] in poetry" article:

- February 3 – Sandra Alcosser, American
- February 9 – Alice Walker, African-American novelist, poet, writer and feminist
- March 9 – Ndoc Gjetja (died 2010), Albanian poet and magazine editor
- March 21 – Pedro Pietri (died 2004), Puerto Rican and Nuyorican poet and playwright, co-founder of Nuyorican Poets Cafe
- March 25 – Jack Mapanje (died 2026), Malawian poet and writer
- April 18 – Kathy Acker (died 1997), American postmodernist experimental novelist and punk poet
- July 18 – Wayne Brown (died 2009), Caribbean (Trinidadian-born)
- July 24 – Jalal Mansur Nuriddin (died 2018), American rap poet and musician
- August 4 – Penn Kemp, Canadian poet, novelist, playwright and sound poet
- August 22 – Tom Leonard (died 2018), Scottish
- August 24 - Paulo Leminski (died 1989), Brazilian poet and translator
- August 25
  - Margaret Gibson (died 1999), African-American
  - Sherley Anne Williams, African-American
- August 31 – Lorenzo Thomas, American
- September 24 – Eavan Boland (died 2020), Irish
- September 25 – bpNichol, Canadian
- October 10 – Linda Rogers, Canadian poet and children's writer
- October 12 – Lewis MacAdams, American poet, journalist and activist, founder of Friends of The Los Angeles River (FoLAR) in 1985
- October 16 – Paul Durcan, Irish
- November 24 – Jules Deelder (died 2019), Dutch
- November 25 – Kathryn Stripling Byer (died 2017), American poet, teacher; North Carolina Poet Laureate, 2005–2009
- December 3 – Craig Raine, English poet and critic
- December 10 – Carol Rumens, English poet, writer, literary editor and academic
- December 18 – Michael Davidson, American
- Also:
  - David Constantine, English poet, translator, editor and academic
  - Susan Ioannou, Canadian
  - Mary Kinzie, American
  - Patrick O'Connell (died 2005), Canadian
  - Jurgen Theobaldy, German
  - Tim Thorne (died 2021), Tasmanian

== Deaths ==
Birth years link to the corresponding "[year] in poetry" article:

- January 7 – Napoleon Lapathiotis (born 1888), Greek poet
- January 19 – Frederick George Scott (born 1861), Canadian poet
- February 9 – Agnes Mary Frances Duclaux (born 1857), English-born poet and biographer
- February 12 – Olive Custance, Lady Alfred Douglas (born 1874), English poet
- February 23 – Augusta Peaux (born 1859), Dutch poet
- March 5 – Alun Lewis (born 1915), Anglo-Welsh school poet and war poet, died on active service in Burma
- March 28 – Stephen Leacock (born 1869), Canadian writer and economist
- April 4 – John Peale Bishop (born 1892), American poet and man of letters
- May 22 – William Ellery Leonard (born 1876), American poet and academic
- June 5 – (Doris) Capel Boake (born 1889), Australian writer
- June 9 – Keith Douglas (born 1920), English war poet died in World War II in the D-Day invasion of Normandy, killed by enemy mortar fire while his regiment is advancing from Bayeux and buried at the war cemetery at Tilly-sur-Seuilles
- June – Joseph Campbell (born 1879), Irish poet and lyricist
- July 3 – A. H. Reginald Buller (born 1874), British/Canadian mycologist mainly known as a researcher of fungi and wheat rust who also wrote limericks, some of which were published in Punch
- July 18 – Thomas Sturge Moore (born 1870), English poet, author and artist
- August 25 – Musa Cälil (born 1905), Soviet Tatar poet and resistance fighter, executed in a Nazi German prison
- September 26 – Eunice Tietjens (born 1884), American poet, novelist, journalist, children's author, lecturer and editor
- September 30 – Baroness Gertrud von Puttkamer, writing as Marie-Madeleine (born 1881), German homoerotic poet, dies in a Nazi sanatorium
- October 2 or 3 – Benjamin Fondane (born 1898), Romanian-French Symbolist poet, critic and existentialist philosopher, gassed in Auschwitz concentration camp
- November 22 – Sadakichi Hartmann (born 1867), American art critic and poet
- November 24 – Jun Tsuji 辻 潤 (born 1884), Japanese author, poet, essayist, translator, musician and bohemian
- December 17 – Robert Nichols (born 1893), English war poet and dramatist
- Also:
  - Olivia Ward Bush-Banks (born 1869), African and Native American poet and journalist
  - K. V. Simon (born 1883), Indian, Malayalam-language poet
  - David Vogel (born 1891), Hebrew poet, gassed in Auschwitz concentration camp

== See also ==
- Poetry
- List of poetry awards
- List of years in poetry
