= 1943 in poetry =

Nationality words link to articles with information on the nation's poetry or literature (for instance, Irish or France).

== Events ==
- August 10 – Soviet Tatar poet and resistance fighter Musa Cälil is arrested by the Gestapo and sent to a prison in Berlin where he composes verses into self-made notebooks.
- September 12 – Abraham Sutzkever, a Polish Jew writing poetry in Yiddish, escapes the Vilna Ghetto with his wife and hides in the forests. Sutzkever and fellow Yiddish poet Shmerke Kaczerginsky, fight against the Nazis as partisans. During the Nazi era, Sutzkever writes more than eighty poems, whose manuscripts he manages to save for postwar publication.
- December – English poet Philip Larkin, having graduated from the University of Oxford, obtains his first post as a librarian (at Wellington, Shropshire).
- Babi Yar in poetry: poems are written about the 1941 Babi Yar massacres by Mykola Bazhan (Микола Бажан) of the Communist Party of the Soviet Union ("Babi Yar"); Sava Holovanivskyi ("Avraam" (Abraham)) and Kievan poet Olga Anstei (Ольга Николаевна Анстей) ("Kirillovskie iary"; "Kirillov Ravines", another name for Babi Yar). She defects this year from the Soviet Union to the West with her husband.
- Nazi Propaganda Minister Joseph Goebbels closes theaters and publishers in Germany.
- Ezra Pound, still in Italy, is indicted for treason by the United States Attorney General.
- Canadian poet, critic and editor John Sutherland publishes a review of Patrick Anderson's poetry in his magazine First Statement (a rival to Anderson's Preview) which suggests homoerotic themes in his writing, and accuses Anderson of "some sexual experience of a kind not normal"; although Anderson would in fact come out as gay later in life, he is married at this time to Peggy Doernbach and threatens to sue. Sutherland prints a retraction in the following issue of his magazine.
- Ottawa native Elizabeth Smart moves permanently to England.
- Focus magazine founded in Jamaica.
- Poetry Scotland magazine founded in Glasgow by Maurice Lindsay.
- Publication of a new comprehensive edition of Friedrich Hölderlin's complete works (Sämtliche Werke, the "Große Stuttgarter Ausgabe"), begins.

== Works published in English ==
Listed by nation where the work was first published and again by the poet's native land, if different; substantially revised works listed separately:

=== Canada ===
- Archibald Lampman, At The Long Sault, edited by Duncan Campbell Scott and E.K. Brown, a selection from Lampman's unpublished manuscripts; posthumous edition
- Wilson MacDonald, Greater Poems Of The Bible: metrical versions, biblical forms, and original poems
- E. J. Pratt, Still Life and Other Verse, Toronto: Macmillan.
- A.J.M. Smith, News of the Phoenix and Other Poems. Toronto: Ryerson Press. Governor General's Award 1943.

Anthologies

- Ralph Gustafson, editor, Canadian Poets, published by New Directions
- A.J.M. Smith, The Book of Canadian Poetry anthology - introduction identified modern poets in Canada as either in "The Native Tradition" or "The Cosmopolitan Tradition";

Criticism

- E.K. Brown, On Canadian Poetry. Governor General's Award 1943.

=== India, in English ===
- Sunderrao Rama Rao Dongerkery, The Ivory Tower (Poetry in English ), Baroda: East and West Book House
- Punjalal, Lotus Petals (Poetry in English ), Pondicherry: Sri Aurobindo Ashram
- Krishna Shungloo, The Night is Heavy (Poetry in English ), Lahore: Free India Publications
- K. R. Srinivasa Iyengar, Indo-Anglian Literature, a pioneering literary history

=== United Kingdom ===
- Kenneth Allott, The Ventriloquist's Doll
- Lilian Bowes Lyon, Evening in Stepney
- Cecil Day-Lewis, Word Over All
- Keith Douglas, Selected Poems
- Lawrence Durrell, A Private Country
- T. S. Eliot, Four Quartets (first collected, in U.S.)
- David Gascoyne, Poems 1937–1942
- Geoffrey Grigson, Under the Cliff, and Other Poems
- Michael Hamburger, Friedrich Hölderlin: Poems
- J. F. Hendry, The Orchestral Mountain
- Sidney Keyes, The Cruel Solstice
- Roy McFadden, Swords and Ploughshares, Northern Ireland poet
- John Pudney, Beyond This Disregard
- Kathleen Raine, Stone and Flower, with drawings by Barbara Hepworth
- Keidrych Rhys, pen name of William Ronald Rhys Jones, editor, More Poems From The Forces, anthology
- William Soutar, But the Earth Abideth
- Dylan Thomas, New Poems, Welsh
- Terence Tiller, The Inward Animal
- W. R. Titterton, Poems for the Forces

=== United States ===
- Leonard Bacon, Day of Fire
- Stephen Vincent Benét, Western Star
- Kenneth Fearing, Afternoon of a Pawnbroker
- Robert Fitzgerald, A Wreath for the Sea
- Langston Hughes, Freedom's Plow
- Weldon Kees, The Last Man
- Archibald MacLeish, Colloquy for the States
- Edna St. Vincent Millay, Collected Lyrics
- Kenneth Patchen, Cloth of the Tempest
- Carl Sandburg, Home Front Memo
- Delmore Schwartz, Genesis: Book One
- Yvor Winters, The Giant Weapon, New Directions
- Elinor Wylie, Last Poems

=== Other in English ===
- Cairo poets, Oasis, English-language soldier-poets published in Egypt
- Allen Curnow, Sailing or Drowning (Progressive Publishing Society), New Zealand

== Works published in other languages ==
Listed by nation where the work was first published and again by the poet's native land, if different; substantially revised works listed separately:

=== France ===
- Louis Aragon, Le Musee Grevin
- Lanza del Vasto, Le Pèlerinage aux sources
- Andrée Chedid, On the Trails of my Fancy
- Robert Desnos, État de veille
- Luc Estang, Mystère apprivoisé
- André Frénaud, Les Rois Mages, Anthony Hartley called this book, "probably the best book of verse published at this time"; first edition (revised edition, 1966)
- Jean Follain, Usage de temps
- Francis Jammes, Elégies et poésies diverses
- André Pieyre de Mandiargues, Dans les années sordides
- Jules Supervielle, Poèmes de la France malheureuse
- Raymond Queneau, Les Ziaux

=== Indian subcontinent ===
Including all of the British colonies that later became India, Pakistan, Bangladesh, Sri Lanka and Nepal. Listed alphabetically by first name, regardless of surname:

- Abdul Shakoor, Daur-i jadid ke cand muntakhab Hindu shu'ara, short biographical sketches and reviews of Hindu poets in the Urdu language
- Acharya Bhagvat, Jivan Ani Sahitya, essays in Marathi, mostly translated from Bengali and Gujarati, including some on which are on Rabindranath Tagore; criticism
- Akhtarul Imam, Girdab, Urdu-language
- Balvantrai Thakore, Navin Kavita Vise Vyakkyano, published lectures in Gujarati by this poet and critic on the forms of Gujarati poetry; criticism
- Bawa Balwant Juala Mukhi, Punjabi
- D. R. Bendre, Meghaduta, translation into Kannada from the Sanskrit of Kalidasa's Meghaduta; the translation is in a modified ragale meter; one of the most popular translations of that poet into the Kannada language
- D. V. Gundappa, Mankuthimmana Kagga, "Song of Mankutimma", Kannada
- G. V. Krishna Rao, Kavya Jagattu, on Marxism, Freudian thought and Indian poetics; Telugu; criticism
- Gauri Shankar Bhadrawahi, Srimad Bhagvadgita, translation into Dogri–Badrawahi from the Sanskrit original
- Lutif Allah Badvi, Tazkira-Elutfi, first volume of a Sindhi-language history of Sindhi poetry (see also Volume 2, 1946, Volume 3 1952)
- Makhan Lal Chaturvedi, Sahitya Devata, essays in literary criticism; Hindi
- Narayan Bezbarua, Mahatmar Maha Prayanat, Indian, Assamese-language
- Agyeya, Tar Saptak, groundbreaking Hindi anthology of seven previously unpublished poets which began the Prayogvad ("Experimentalism") movement; that, in turn, grew into the Nayi kavita ("New Poetry") movement in Hindi poetry. "The importance of Tar Saptak to the development of Hindi verse cannot be overstated", according to Ludmila L. Rosenstein. The movement got its name as a derisive term coined by critics who noted the constant use of the word prayog ("experimentalism") in Agyeya's introduction. That introduction and later writings by Agyeya made him one of the chief literary critics in India in the rest of the 20th century. The anthology was reprinted in new editions, with the sixth appearing in 1996. The seven poets in this edition: Agyeya, Gajanan Madhav Muktibodh, Shamsher Bahadur Singh, Raghuvir Sahay, Sarveshwar Dayal Saxena, Kunwar Narain and Kedarnath Singh.
- Vijayrai Vaidya, Gujarati Sahityani Ruprekha, a Gujarati history of the literature in that language; scholarship

=== Other languages ===
- Chairil Anwar, "Aku" ("Me"), Indonesian
- Odysseus Elytis, Sun the First, Greek
- Gerardo Diego, Poemas adrede ("Purposeful Poems");Spain
- Sorley MacLean, Dàin do Eimhir agus Dàin Eile, Scottish Gaelic
- Eugenio Montale, Finisterre, a chapbook of poetry, smuggled into Switzerland by Gianfranco Contini; Lugano: the Collana di Lugano (June 24); second edition, 1945, Florence: Barbèra; Italy
- César Moro, pen name of César Quíspez Asín, Le château de grisou, Peru
- Luis Rosales and Luis Felipe Vivanco, editors, Sonetos à la piedra ("Sonnets to Stone"), anthology of heroic poetry; Spain
- Ole Sarvig, Grønne Digte ("Green Poems"), the author's first book of poems; Denmark

== Awards and honors ==
- Consultant in Poetry to the Library of Congress (later the post would be called "Poet Laureate Consultant in Poetry to the Library of Congress"): Allen Tate appointed this year. He would serve until 1943.
- Frost Medal: Edna St. Vincent Millay
- Governor General's Award, poetry or drama: News of the Phoenix, A.J.M. Smith (Canada)

== Births ==
Death years link to the corresponding "[year] in poetry" article:

- April 22 – Louise Glück (died 2023), American poet laureate and winner of the 2020 Nobel Prize in Literature
- May 9 – Ellen Bryant Voigt, American poet
- May 11 – Michael Palmer, American poet, translator and winner of 2006 Wallace Stevens Award
- May 17 – Robert Adamson (died 2022), Australian poet and publisher
- June 7 – Nikki Giovanni (died 2024), African American poet, activist and author
- July 20 – Adrian Păunescu (died 2010), Romanian poet and politician
- July 21 – Tess Gallagher, American poet, essayist, novelist and playwright
- July 22 – Hadi Khorsandi, Iranian poet and satirist
- August 14 – Alfred Corn, American poet and essayist
- September 12 – Michael Ondaatje, Canadian-Sri Lankan novelist and poet whose Booker Prize winning novel The English Patient is adapted into an Academy Award-winning film
- October 1 – Justo Jorge Padrón (died 2021), Canarian Spanish poet, translator and lawyer
- October 2 – Franklin Rosemont (died 2009), American Surrealist poet, labor historian and co-founder of the Chicago Surrealist Group
- December 2 – John Balaban, American poet and translator
- December 8:
  - James Tate, American poet, educator, man of letters and a winner of the Pulitzer Prize, National Book Award
  - Jim Morrison (died 1971), American singer, songwriter, poet; best known as the lead singer and lyricist of The Doors
- December 9 – Michael Krüger, German poet, writer, publisher and translator
- Also:
  - Alan Bold (died 1998), Scottish poet
  - Richard Berengarten, English poet
  - Emanuel di Pasquale, American poet and translator
  - Vicki Feaver, English poet
  - Hadrawi (Mohamed Ibrahim Warsame) (died 2022), Somali poet
  - Tridib Mitra, Bengali poet associated with the 1961–1965 Hungryalism (or "Hungry Generation") movement
  - Robert C. Morgan, American art critic, art historian, curator, poet and artist
  - Ron Smith, Canadian poet, author, playwright and publisher
  - Frederick Turner, English poet, critic and academic in the United States; editor of The Kenyon Review
  - Bill Zavatsky, American poet, journalist, jazz pianist and translator

== Deaths ==
Birth years link to the corresponding "[year] in poetry" article:

- January 3 – F. M. Cornford, 68 (born 1874), English classical scholar and poet
- January 31 – Loa Ho, 48 (born 1894), Taiwanese poet, died in jail
- February 27 – Kostis Palamas, 84 (born 1859) Greek poet
- March 10 – Lawrence Binyon, 72 (born 1869), English poet, dramatist and art scholar
- March 13 – Stephen Vincent Benét, 44 (born 1898), American poet, heart attack
- March 19 – Tsugi Takano 鷹野 つぎ, 52 (born 1890), Japanese novelist and poet (a woman; surname: Takano)
- April 29 – Sidney Keyes, 20 (born 1922), English poet killed in action in Tunisia
- May 29 – Guido Mazzoni, 84 (born 1859), Italian poet
- August 12 – Kurt Eggers, 37 (born 1905), Nazi German writer, poet, songwriter and playwright killed in action on the Eastern Front
- September 13 – Sanjayan, pen name of M. R. Nayar, 40 (born 1903), Indian, Malayalam-language poet and academic
- October 7 – Radclyffe Hall, 63, English poet and author of the lesbian novel The Well of Loneliness
- October 15 – William Soutar, 45 (born 1898), leading poet of the Scottish Literary Renaissance. Bedridden from 1930, he died of tuberculosis
- October 24 – Hector de Saint-Denys Garneau, 31 (born 1912), Canadian considered "Quebec's first truly modern poet", heart disease
- November 22 – Lorenz Hart, 48 (born 1895), American lyricist
- November 24 – France Balantič, 21 (born 1921), Yugoslav Slovene poet killed as member of Slovene Home Guard in action against Slovene Partisans (b. 1921)
- November 26 – Charles G. D. Roberts, 83 (born 1860), Canadian poet and writer known as the "Father of Canadian Poetry" because he served as an inspiration for other writers of his time; also known as one of the "Confederation poets" (together with his cousin Bliss Carman, William Wilfred Campbell Archibald Lampman and Duncan Campbell Scott)
- November 27 – Louis Esson, 65 (born 1878), Australian poet and playwright
- December 2
  - Drummond Allison (born 1921), English poet killed in action in Italy
  - Nordahl Grieg, 41 (born 1902), Norwegian poet and author killed in action over Germany

== See also ==
- Poetry
- List of poetry awards
- List of years in poetry
