= 1945 in poetry =

Nationality words link to articles with information on the nation's poetry or literature (for instance, Irish or France).

== Events ==
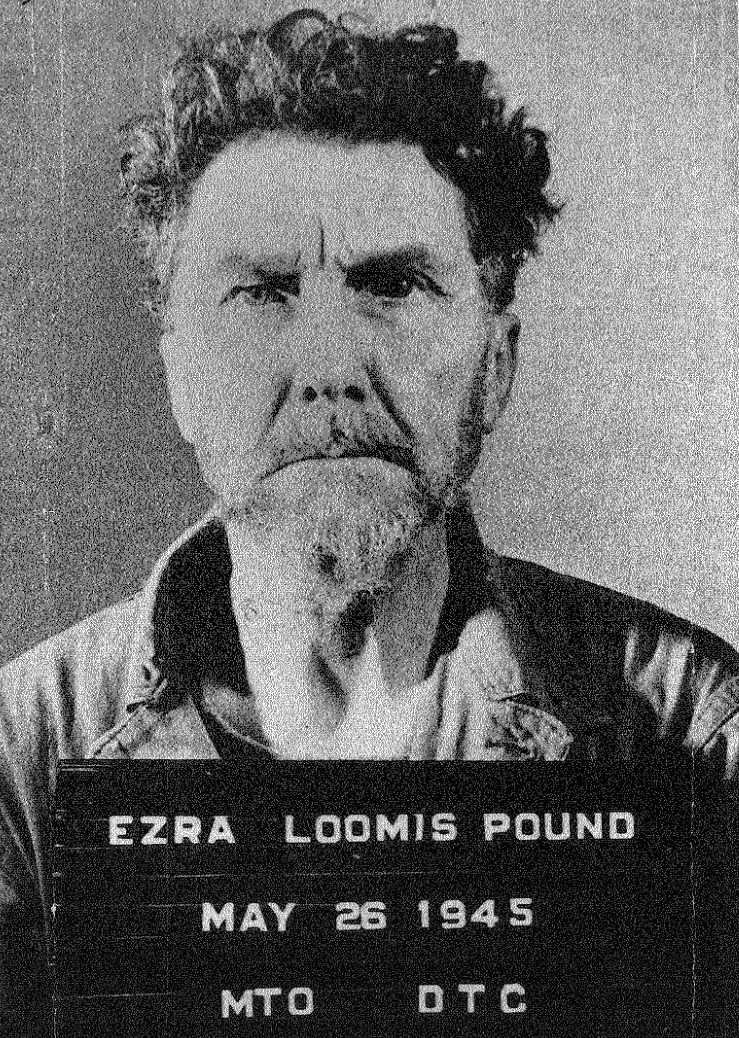
Ezra Pound mug shot

- March 4 — Pablo Neruda elected a Communist party senator in Chile. He officially joins the Communist Party of Chile four months later.
- April — Ilona Karmel and Henia Karmel, sisters from the Kraków Ghetto and together Polish Jewish prisoners of the Nazis, are on a forced death march when Germans in tanks crush them and then shove them, still living, into a mass grave. Soon after, a group of prisoners passes them, including a cousin of theirs. From their hiding place in her clothes, Henia Karmel rips out some poems she and her sister had written and hands them to her cousin to give to her husband, Leon, back in Kraków. The cousin delivers the poems, and the sisters are saved by a nearby farmer who takes them to a hospital. Henia writes in 1947, "these poems are real, not just scribblings.[they] came about when I was still creating myself, experiencing the pain of separation. How I could have survived, you might ask? If so, sir, you know nothing of life. It lasted, that's all." Henia writes in her poem, "Snapshots": "My name is Number 906. / And guess what? I still write verse."
- April 2 — British aircraft carrier HMS Glory is commissioned and sails for the Pacific theatre of war; Cornish poet Charles Causley is serving as a Chief Petty Officer Coder on this voyage.
- May — Estonian poet Heiti Talvik is deported to Siberia and never heard from again.
- May 2 — Ezra Pound is arrested by Italian partisans, and taken (according to Hugh Kenner) "to their HQ in Chiavari, where he was soon released as possessing no interest". On May 5, he turns himself in to U.S. forces. He is incarcerated in a United States Army detention camp outside Pisa, spending 25 days in an open cage before being given a tent. Here he appears to have suffered a nervous breakdown. While in the camp he drafts the Pisan Cantos, a section of the work in progress which marks a shift in Pound's work, being a meditation on his own and Europe's ruin and on his place in the natural world. The Pisan Cantos wins the first Bollingen Prize from the Library of Congress in 1948.
- May 8 — Victory in Europe Day: Edmund Blunden writes the poem "V Day" to mark the occasion; it will not be published until the 75th anniversary.
- June — Ern Malley hoax: Australia's most celebrated literary hoax takes place when Angry Penguins is published with poems by the fictional Ern Malley. Poets James McAuley and Harold Stewart created the poems from lines of other published work and then sent them as the purported work of a recently deceased poet. The hoax is played on Max Harris, at this time a 22-year-old avant garde poet and critic who had started the modernist magazine Angry Penguins. Harris and his circle of literary friends agreed that a hitherto completely unknown modernist poet of great merit had come to light in suburban Australia. The Autumn 1944 edition of the magazine with the poems comes out in mid-1945 due to wartime printing delays with cover illustration by Sidney Nolan. An Australian newspaper uncovers the hoax within weeks. McAuley and Stewart loved early Modernist poets but despise later modernism and especially the well-funded Angry Penguins and are jealous of Harris's precocious success.
- June 7 — Benjamin Britten's opera Peter Grimes, based on a section of George Crabbe's poem The Borough (1810), is premiered in London.
- August 6 — Atomic bombing of Hiroshima: Japanese poet Sadako Kurihara writes "Bringing Forth New Life" (生ましめんかな, Umashimen-kana) in the ruins.
- August 16 — Japanese Admiral Takijirō Ōnishi commits seppuku having left a death poem.
- German poets Johannes Bobrowski and Peter Huchel, serving in the German army, are taken prisoner by the Soviet Union.
- Two small Canadian literary magazines, Preview and First Statement (each founded separately in 1942) combine to form Northern Review (which lasts until 1956).
- Kyk-over-al magazine founded in Guyana.
- Vladimir Nabokov becomes a naturalized citizen of the United States.

== Works published in English ==
Listed by nation where the work was first published and again by the poet's native land, if different; substantially revised works listed separately:

=== Canada ===
- Earle Birney, Now Is Time. Toronto: Ryerson Press. Governor General's Award 1945.
- Arthur Bourinot, True Harvest.
- Irving Layton, Here and Now
- Anne Marriott, Sandstone and Other Poems, Toronto: Ryerson Press.
- E. J. Pratt, They Are Returning, Toronto: Macmillan.
- F. R. Scott. Overture. Toronto: Ryerson Press.
- Elizabeth Smart, "By Grand Central Station I Sat Down and Wept" (prose poem)
- Raymond Souster, When We Are Young. Montreal: First Statement.
- Miriam Waddington, Green World

=== India, in English ===
- Serapia Devi, The Book of Beneficent Grief and Other Poems ( Poetry in English ), Lahore: R. S. Ram Jawaya Kapur
- B. Rajan, Monsoon ( Poetry in English ),
- Subho Tagore, May Day and Other Poems ( Poetry in English ), Calcutta: Book Emporium
- V.N. Bhushan, editor, The Peacock Lute: An Anthology of Poems in English by Indian Writers, Bombay: Padma Pub., 155 pages

=== United Kingdom ===
- W. H. Auden, English poet living in the United States
  - Collected Poems
  - For the Time Being
- John Betjeman, New Bats in Old Belfries
- Cairo poets, ed. by Robin Redden, Terence Tiller, Bernard Spencer et al., Personal Landscape: an anthology of exile, repr. in London from magazine Personal Landscape (published in Egypt)
- R. N. Currey, This Other Planet
- Walter de la Mare, The Burning-Glass, and Other Poems
- W. S. Graham, Second Poems
- Michael Hamburger, Later Hogarth
- A. P. Herbert, Light the Lights
- sidney Keyes (killed in action 1943), Collected Poems
- Philip Larkin, The North Ship, London: Dent
- Alun Lewis (died on active service 1944), Ha! Ha! Among the Trumpets, foreword by Robert Graves
- Ruth Pitter, The Bridge
- William Plomer, The Dorking Thigh, and Other Satires
- F. T. Prince, Soldiers Bathing, and Other Poems
- Vernon Watkins, The Lamp and the Veil

=== United States ===
- W. H. Auden, The Collected Poetry, English poet living in the United States
- John Malcolm Brinnin, No Arch, No Triumph
- Gwendolyn Brooks, A Street in Bronzeville
- Emily Dickinson, Bolts of Melody, published posthumously
- H.D. (Hilda Doolittle), "Tribute to the Angels", second part of Trilogy (1944–46) about the experience of the Blitz in wartime London
- Randall Jarrell, Little Friend, Little Friend, including "The Death of the Ball Turret Gunner", New York: Dial Press
- William Ellery Leonard (died 1944), A Man Against Time
- Ogden Nash, Many Long Years Ago
- John Crowe Ransom, Selected Poems
- Karl Shapiro, Essay on Rime
- Wallace Stevens, Esthetique du Mal, Cummington Press

=== Other in English ===
- George Campbell (poet), First Poems, Caribbean
- Allen Curnow, editor, A Book of New Zealand Verse 1923–45 (Caxton), New Zealander
- Denis Glover, The Wind and the Sand, New Zealander
- Kenneth Slessor, Australian Poetry, anthology, Australia

== Works published in other languages ==
=== France ===
- Louis Aragon:
  - La Diane française
  - Le Nouveau Crevecoeur, about the Resistance
- René Char, Seuls demeurent
- Paul Claudel, Visages radieux
- Max Jacob, Derniers Poemès, published posthumously (died 1944)
- Pierre Jean Jouve:
  - Trois Poèmes aux Démons, Porrentruy: Portes de France
  - La Vierge de Paris
- Henri Michaux, Épreuves, exorcismes
- Saint-John Perse, Exil, suivi de Poème à l'étrangère; Pluies; Neiges Paris: Gallimard (a republication of Quatre poèmes, 1941-1944, Buenos Aires: Les Editions Lettres Françaises 1944), France
- Jacques Prévert, Spectacles
- Pierre Reverdy, Plupart du temps: poèmes 1915–1922
- Madeleine Riffaud, Le Poing fermé
- Georges Schéhadé, Chants d'ombre

=== Indian subcontinent ===
Including all of the British colonies that later became India, Pakistan, Bangladesh, Sri Lanka and Nepal. Listed alphabetically by first name, regardless of surname:

==== Kashmiri ====
- Abdul Ahad Azad, Daryav, the author's magnum opus, on the theme of political revolution
- Mahjoor:
  - Kalam-e Mahjoor (No. 9), lyrics on love
  - Payem-e Mahjoor (No. 2 and No. 3), in the Devanagari script; on social and national themes

==== Malayalam ====
- G. Sankara Kurup, Nimisam
- Pappukkutti Kotamangalam, Katattuvanci, one of the first poetry books of the progressive movement in Malayalam literature
- V. A. Anandakkuttan, Aradhana

==== Other Indian languages ====
- Desikavinayagam Pillai, translator, Umarkayyam Patalkar, translation into Tamil of Edward Fitzgerald's English translation of Omar Khayyam's Rubaiyat
- Devakanta Barua, Sagar dekhisa; Assamese-language
- Devarakonda Balagangadhara Tilak, Prabhatamu-Sandhya; Telugu-language
- Dinu Bhai Pant, Guttalum, seven poems, including two lengthy ones, Dogri
- E. V. R. Namputiri, translator, Mahakavih Krtyah, translation into Sanskrit from the Malayalam poems of Ulloor
- Firak, Urdu Ki 'ishqiyah sha'iri, a major Urdu poet's literary criticism in Urdu on the idea of love as expressed in that language's poetry
- Gopal Prasad Rimal, Masan ("The Crematorium"); Nepali-language
- Gurnam Singh Tir, Hasdi Dunia; Punjabi
- Laxmi Prasad Devkota, Sakuntal (शाकुन्तल), the first long epic poem in the Nepali language, 24 cantos in Sanskrit Varnik meters, and the diction is very "Sanskritized"
- P. V. Krishnan Nair, translator, Madirotsava, translation into Sanskrit of Edward Fitzgerald's English translation of Omar Khayyam's Rubaiyat
- Trilochan, Dharti, Hindi-language pragativadi poems largely on man's struggles and life's contradictions
- V. R. M. Chettiyar, translator, Kitancali, translation into Tamil from the Indian poetry in English of Rabindranath Tagore's Gitanjali

=== Other languages ===
- Mario Benedetti, La víspera indeleble ("Indelible Eve"), his first published book, Uruguay
- Alaíde Foppa, Poesías, Guatemala
- Eugenio Montale, Finisterre, a chapbook of poetry; second edition; Florence: Barbèra (first edition published in 1943 after a manuscript was smuggled into Switzerland ); Italy
- Leopoldo Panero, Versos del Guadarrama ("Verses of Guadarrama"); Spain

== Awards ==
- Consultant in Poetry to the Library of Congress (later the post would be called "Poet Laureate Consultant in Poetry to the Library of Congress"): Louise Bogan appointed this year. She would serve until sometime in 1946.
- Pulitzer Prize for Poetry: Karl Shapiro, V-Letter and Other Poems
- Governor General's Award, poetry or drama: Now is Time, Earle Birney (Canada)

== Births ==
Death years link to the corresponding "[year] in poetry" article:

- February 2 – Yoshihiko Funazaki 舟崎 克彦, Japanese novelist, poet, illustrator, manga writer, songwriter and academic (surname: Funazaki)
- February 10 – Clive Wilmer, English poet and academic
- February 23 – Robert Gray (died 2025), Australian
- March 7 – Ira Sadoff, American poet and academic
- April 2 – Anne Waldman, American
- April 10 – Norman Dubie, American
- April 13 – Lucha Corpi, Mexican-born poet and mystery writer
- April 18 – Dick Davis, English-born poet and translator
- April 30 – Annie Dillard, American poet, 1975 Pulitzer Prize winner
- May 12 – Bernadette Mayer, American
- June 7 – Falguni Ray (died 1981), Bengali poet and youngest member of Hungryalism movement
- June 21
  - Nirmalendu Goon, Bengali poet
  - Adam Zagajewski, Polish poet, novelist and essayist
- July 7 – Natsuki Ikezawa (池澤夏樹), Japanese novelist, essayist, translator and poet, stops publishing poetry in 1982
- July 12 – Remy Sylado (Yapi Panda Abdiel Tambayong), Indonesian writer
- July 21 – Wendy Cope, English
- August 12 – J. D. McClatchy (died 2018), gay American poet, literary critic and editor of the Yale Review
- August 13 – Tom Wayman, Canadian poet and academic
- August 28 – Marianne Bluger (died 2005), Canadian
- August 29 – Galit Hasan-Rokem, born Galit Hasan, Finnish-born Israeli Hebrew folklorist and poet
- August 31 – Van Morrison, OBE, Irish poet, singer-songwriter, author and musician
- September 21 – Kay Ryan, American
- November 8 – Alice Notley, American
- November 15 – Amir Mahmud Anvar Iranian literary academic and poet (died 2012)
- December 14
  - Stanley Crouch (died 2020), American poet and music and cultural critic
  - Carolyn Rodgers (died 2010), American
- Also:
  - Magaly Alabau, Cuban
  - W. S. Di Piero, American
  - Carol Muske-Dukes, American
  - Bernard O'Donoghue, Irish-born poet and academic
  - Leon Stokesbury, American

== Deaths ==
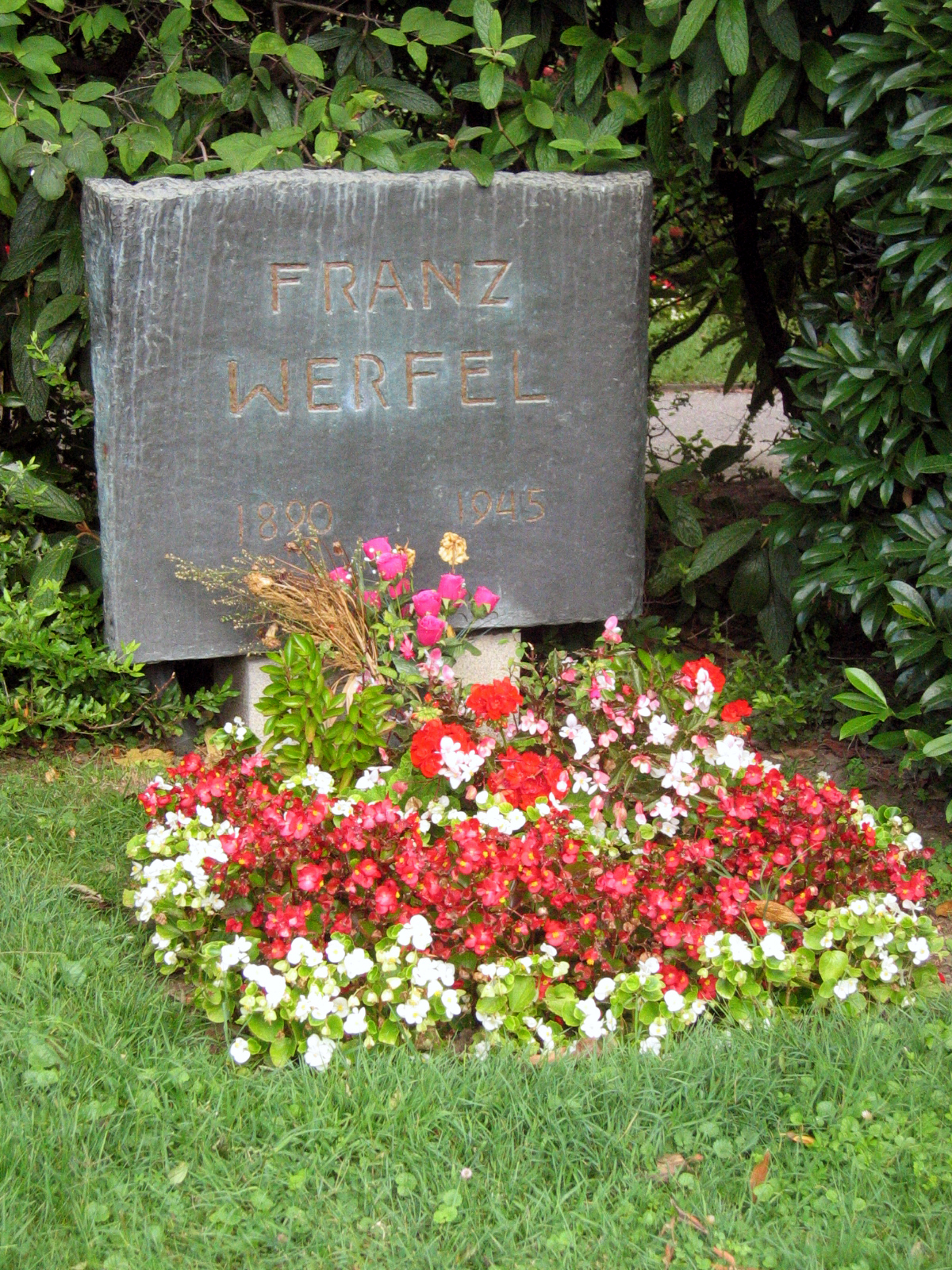
Grave of Franz Werfel

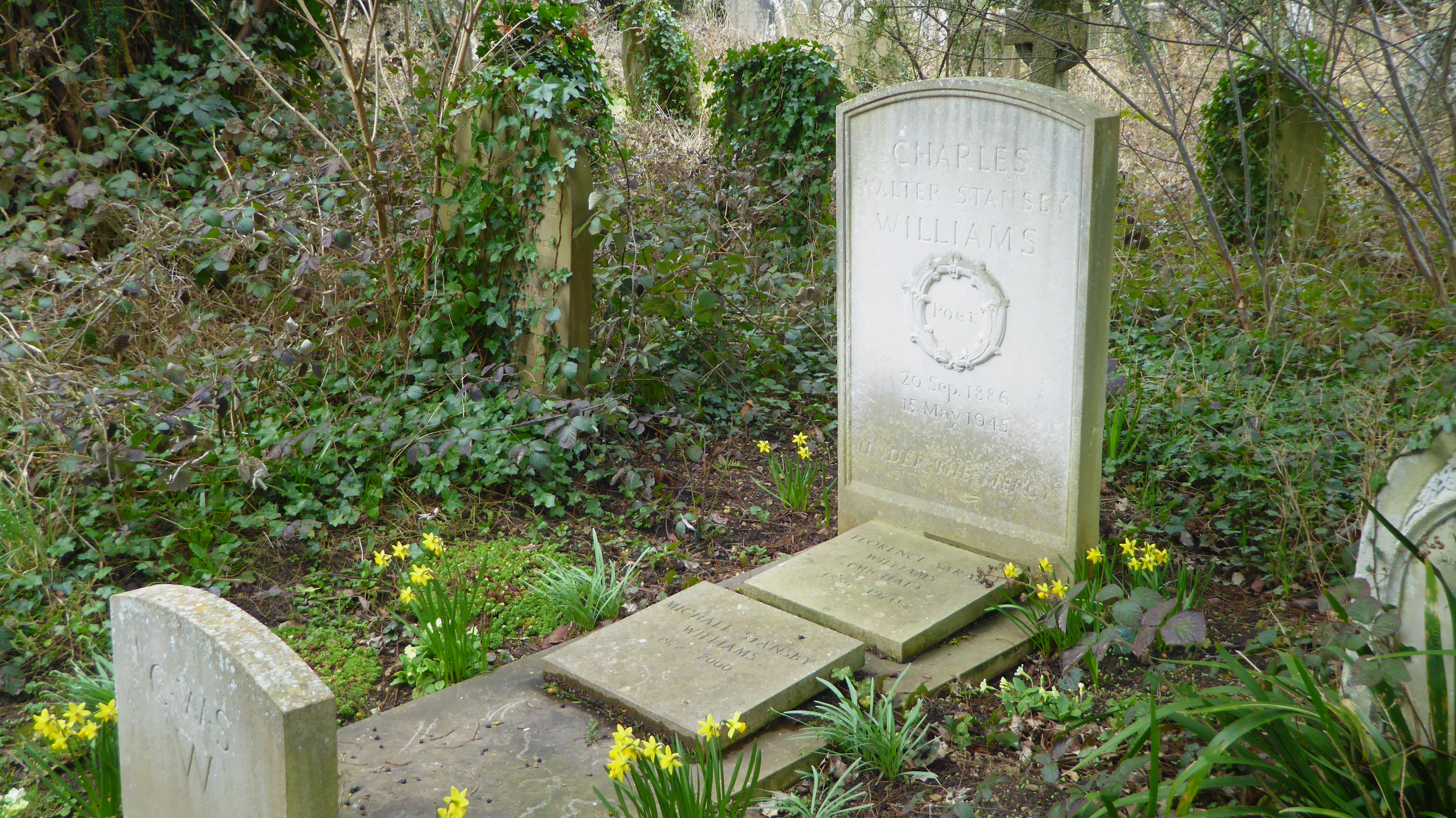
Grave of Charles Williams

Birth years link to the corresponding "[year] in poetry" article:

- January 15 — Ursula Bethell, 70 (born 1874), New Zealand
- January 22 — Else Lasker-Schüler, 75 (born 1869), German-born Jewish poet
- c. January 27 — Antal Szerb, 43 (born 1901), Hungarian writer, killed in Wolfs (Balf) concentration camp; buried with pages of his bilingual anthology Száz vers ("100 poems", 1943/1944) in his pockets
- February 1 – Teresa Bogusławska, 16 (born 1929), Polish poet and resistance worker, of meningitis
- February 16 – Yun Dong-ju, 27 (born 1917), Korean poet, died in a Japanese prison (surname: Yoon; also spelled "Yoon Dong-joo" and "Yun Tong-ju")
- February 25 – Mário de Andrade, 51 (born 1893), Brazilian poet and academic
- March 16 — Börries von Münchhausen, 70 (born 1874), German poet and Nazi activist, suicide
- March 20 — Lord Alfred Douglas, 74 (born 1870), English poet, former lover of Oscar Wilde
- May 15 — Charles Williams, 58 (born 1886), English poet, novelist, theologian, critic and publisher, member of The Inklings
- June 8 — Robert Desnos, 44 (born 1900), French surrealist poet and journalist, arrested by the Gestapo as a member of the French Resistance and sent to Buchenwald concentration camp in 1944; dies soon after liberation of Theresienstadt concentration camp in German-occupied Czechoslovakia where he was held, of typhoid
- July 20 — Paul Valéry, 73 (born 1871), French philosopher, author and Symbolist poet
- August 26 — Franz Werfel, 54 (born 1890), Austrian-Bohemian German-language novelist, playwright and poet
- September 9 — Zinaida Gippius, 75 (born 1869), Russian poet, novelist and playwright
- December 14 — Maurice Baring, 71 (born 1874), versatile English man of letters: dramatist, poet, novelist, translator, essayist, travel writer and war correspondent
- Undated — Swami Ananda Acharya (born 1881), Indian poet who wrote Indian poetry in English

== See also ==
- Poetry
- List of poetry awards
- List of years in poetry
