= 1884 in poetry =

List of years in poetry	(table)
- … 1874; 1875; 1876; 1877; 1878; 1879; 1880; 1881; 1882; 1883; 1884; 1885; 1886; 1887; 1888; 1889; 1890; 1891; 1892; 1893; 1894 …
- In literature 1881 1882 1883 1884 1885 1886 1887
- Art; Archaeology; Architecture; Literature; Music; Philosophy; Science; +...

Nationality words link to articles with information on the nation's poetry or literature (for instance, Irish or France).

== Events ==
- February 18 – English Jesuit poet Gerard Manley Hopkins takes up a post as professor of Greek and Latin at University College Dublin in Ireland, where he will remain until his death in 1889 and write his "terrible sonnets".

== Works published ==
=== Canada ===
- Isabella Valancy Crawford, Old Spookses' Pass, Malcolm's Katie, and Other Poems. Published at author's expense.
- James McIntyre. Musings on the Banks of the Canadian Thames. London, ON.

=== United Kingdom ===
- Francis Adams, Henry and Other Tales
- Robert Browning, Ferishtah's Fancies
- Andrew Lang, Rhymes à la Mode
- Amy Levy, A Minor Poet, and Other Verse
- Marc-André Raffalovich, Cyril and Lionel and other poems: a volume of sentimental studies, French-born author writing in English
- Algernon Charles Swinburne, A Midsummer Holiday, and Other Poems

=== United States ===
- Thomas Bailey Aldrich, Mercedes and Later Lyrics
- Louise Imogen Guiney, Songs at the Start
- Sidney Lanier, Poems, published posthumously
- Joaquin Miller, Memorie and Rime
- Edmund Clarence Stedman, Songs and Ballads
- Henry Timrod, Katie

=== Other ===
- Rosario de Acuña, Sentir y pensar, Spain
- Rosalia de Castro, En las orillas del Sar, Galician Spanish poet, writing in Spanish
- Lie Kim Hok, Sair Tjerita Siti Akbari, ethnic Chinese poet, writing in Malay
- Rabindranath Tagore, Bhanusimha Thakurer Padabali, Indian poet, writing in Braj Bhasha

== Awards and honors ==
- English poet Alfred Tennyson is created 1st Baron Tennyson of Aldworth in the County of Sussex and of Freshwater in the Isle of Wight, in the Peerage of the United Kingdom, hereafter being known as Alfred, Lord Tennyson.

== Births ==
Death years link to the corresponding "[year] in poetry" article:

- February 14 – Kostas Varnalis (Κώστας Βάρναλης), (died 1974), Greek
- March 28 – Angelos Sikelianos (Άγγελος Σικελιανός) (died 1951), Greek poet and playwright
- April 2 - John Collings Squire (died 1958), English poet, writer, historian, and influential literary editor of the post-World War I period
- June 29 - Francis Brett Young (died 1954), English novelist and poet
- July 24 - Donald Evans (died 1921), American poet, publisher, music critic and journalist
- July 29 - Eunice Tietjens (died 1944), American poet, novelist, journalist, children's author, lecturer, and editor
- August 8 - Sara Teasdale (died 1933), American lyric poet
- October 13 - Walter J. Turner (died 1946), Australian-born poet and music critic
- November 5 - James Elroy Flecker (died 1915), English poet, novelist and playwright
- December 31 - George Sylvester Viereck (died 1962), German-American poet, writer and propagandist
- Date not known - Leknath Ponday, Indian, Nepali-language poet

== Deaths ==
Birth years link to the corresponding "[year] in poetry" article:

- January 7 – John Harris (born 1820), English poet
- February 17 – Charles Stuart Calverley, 82 (born 1831), English poet and wit
- February 28 – Matsudaira Teru 松平照 also called "Teruhime" 照姫, literally translated, "Princess Teru" (born 1832), Japanese, late Edo and early Meiji period aristocrat and skilled waka poet who instructed Matsudaira Katamori in poetry and calligraphy
- March 13 – Richard Henry Horne, 81 (born 1802), English poet, critic and journalist, and public official in Australia
- March 19 – Elias Lönnrot, 81, Finnish philologist and collector of traditional Finnish oral poetry best known for composing the Kalevala, the Finnish national epic compiled from national folklore
- June 27 – Andreas Munch, 72 (born 1811), Norwegian poet
- December 3 – Jane C. Bonar, 73 (born 1821), American hymnwriter

== See also ==
- 19th century in poetry
- 19th century in literature
- List of years in poetry
- List of years in literature
- Victorian literature
- French literature of the 19th century
- Poetry
