= 1871 in poetry =

List of years in poetry	(table)
- … 1861; 1862; 1863; 1864; 1865; 1866; 1867; 1868; 1869; 1870; 1871; 1872; 1873; 1874; 1875; 1876; 1877; 1878; 1879; 1880; 1881 …
- In literature 1868 1869 1870 1871 1872 1873 1874
- Art; Archaeology; Architecture; Literature; Music; Philosophy; Science; +...

'Twas brillig, and the slithy toves

Did gyre and gimble in the wabe;
All mimsy were the borogoves,
And the mome raths outgrabe.

"Beware the Jabberwock, my son!
The jaws that bite, the claws that catch!
Beware the Jubjub bird, and shun

The frumious Bandersnatch!"

— From Lewis Carroll's "Jabberwocky", published as part of Through the Looking Glass

Nationality words link to articles with information on the nation's poetry or literature (for instance, Irish or France).

== Events ==
- April – French author Victor Hugo moves to Brussels to take care of the family of his son, who has just died, but closely follows events in the Paris Commune, on April 21 publishing the poem "Pas de représailles" (No reprisals) and on June 11 writing the poem "Sur une barricade" (On the barricade).

== Works published in English ==
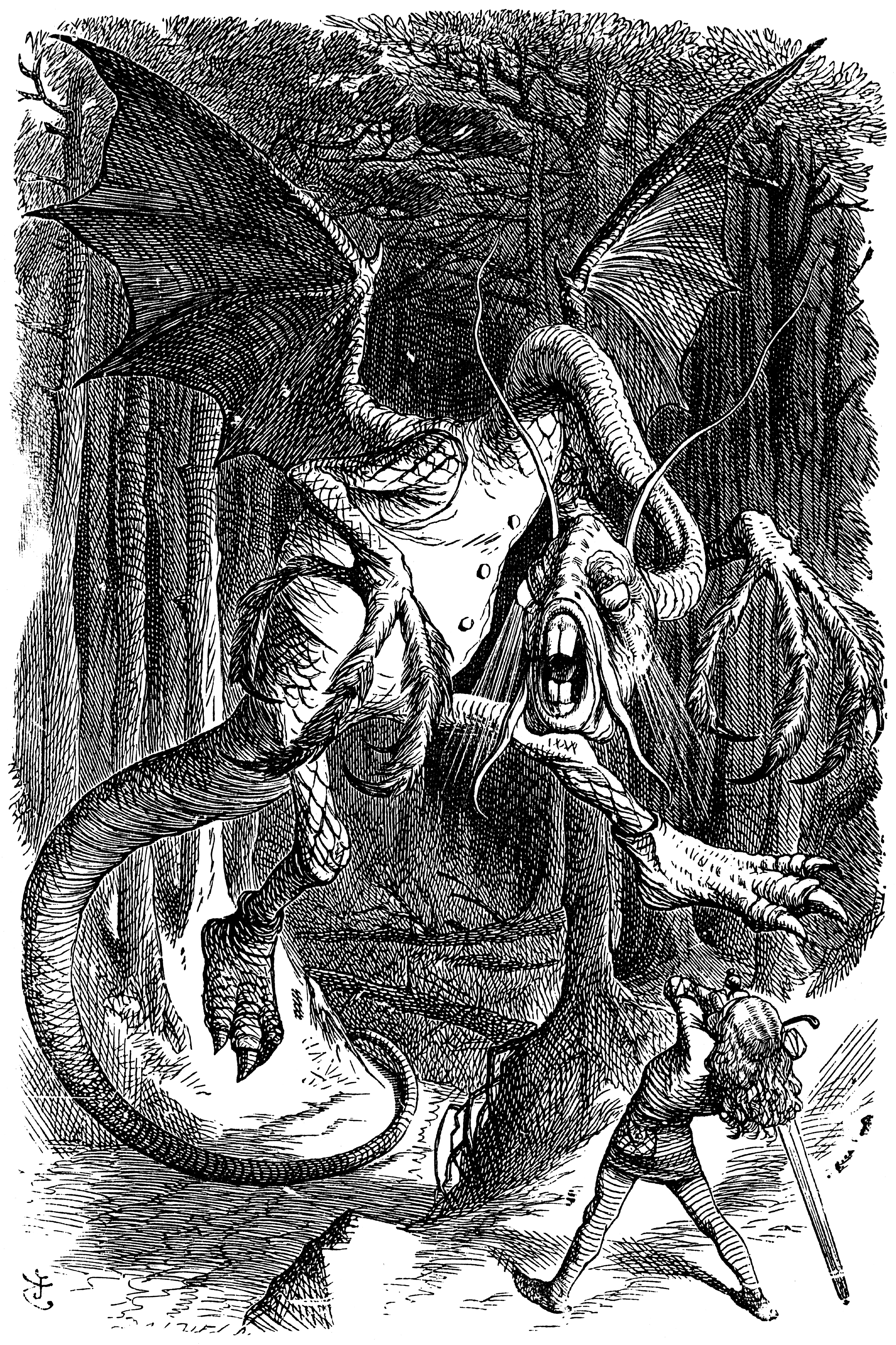
The Jabberwock, as illustrated by John Tenniel for Lewis Carroll's Through the Looking Glass, including the poem "Jabberwocky".

=== United Kingdom ===
Death years link to the corresponding "[year] in poetry" article:

- Robert Browning:
  - Blaustion's Adventure
  - Prince Hohenstiel-Schwangau, Saviour of Society
- Lewis Carroll (pen name of C. L. Dodgson), Through the Looking Glass, and What Alice Found There, including "Jabberwocky" and "The Walrus and the Carpenter" (published this year, although the book states "1872")
- "Thomas Maitland" (i.e., Robert Williams Buchanan) attacks Dante Gabriel Rossetti and other members of what Buchanan calls the "Fleshly School" of English poetry in The Contemporary Review (October); and Rossetti replies in "The Stealthy School of Criticism" in the Athenaeum (December 16)
- Monckton Milnes, falsely attributed to George Colman the Younger, The Rodiad, flagellatory poem, falsely dated 1810
- James Brunton Stephens, Convict Once, Scottish-born Australian poet published in London
- Algernon Charles Swinburne, Songs before Sunrise
- Alfred Lord Tennyson, "The Last Tournament" published in The Contemporary Review, December edition (one of Tennyson's "Arthurian Idylls", later published in Gareth and Lynette 1872)

=== United States ===
- William Cullen Bryant, Poems
- William Ellery Channing, The Wanderer
- Bret Harte, East and West Poems
- John Hay, Pike County Ballads
- Emma Lazarus, Admetus and Other Poems
- Joaquin Miller, pen name of Cincinnatus Heine (or Hiner) Miller:
  - Songs of the Sierras
  - Pacific Poems

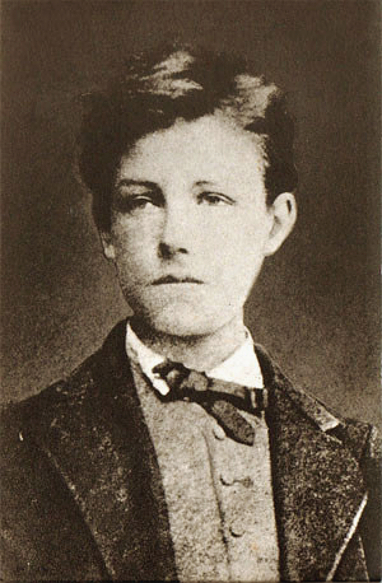
Arthur Rimbaud photographed by Étienne Carjat, October 1871.

- Walt Whitman:
  - Leaves of Grass, fifth edition
  - Passage to India
- John Greenleaf Whittier, Miriam and Other Poems

=== Works published in other languages ===
- François Coppée, Fais ce que dois , short verse drama inspired by the Franco-Prussian War; France
- Arthur Rimbaud, Le bateau ivre ("The Drunken Boat"), France

== Births ==
Death years link to the corresponding "[year] in poetry" article:

- February 3 – Francis Joseph Sherman (died 1926), Canadian
- February 25 (February 13 Old Style) – Lesya Ukrainka, born Larysa Kosach (died 1913), Ukrainian
- April 16 – John Millington Synge (died 1909), Irish dramatist, poet, prose writer, collector of folklore, a prominent figure in the Irish Literary Revival and a co-founder of the Abbey Theatre
- June 17 – James Weldon Johnson (died 1938), African-American author, poet, early civil rights activist and prominent figure in the Harlem Renaissance
- July 3 – W. H. Davies (died 1940), Welsh-born poet and writer who spends most of his life as a tramp in the United States and United Kingdom, but becomes known as one of the most popular poets of his time
- July 15 – Kunikida Doppo 國木田 獨歩 (died 1908), Japanese, Meiji period romantic poet and one of the novelists who pioneers naturalism in Japan (surname: Kunikida)
- September 2 – John Le Gay Brereton (died 1933), Australian poet, critic and academic
- September 9 – Ralph Hodgson (died 1962), British
- October 30 – Paul Valéry (died 1945), French philosopher, author and Symbolist poet who also writes essays and aphorisms on art, history, letters, music and current events
- November 1 – Stephen Crane (died 1900), American novelist, poet and journalist
- Date not known
  - Hafez Ibrahim (died 1932), Egyptian, Arabic-language "poet of the Nile"
  - Madhavanuj, pen name of Kashinath Hari Modak (died 1917), Indian, Marathi-language poet and translator; a physician

== Deaths ==
Death years link to the corresponding "[year] in poetry" article:

- February 12 – Alice Cary (born 1820), American poet
- April 23 – James Monroe Whitfield (born 1822), African-American barber, poet and abolitionist
- May 11
  - John Herschel (born 1792), English polymath
  - Thomas Buchanan Read (born 1822), American poet and portrait painter
- July 31 – Phoebe Cary (born 1824), sister of Alice, American poet
- September 22 – Charlotte Elliott (born 1789), English religious poet

== See also ==
- 19th century in poetry
- 19th century in literature
- List of years in poetry
- List of years in literature
- Victorian literature
- French literature of the 19th century
- Poetry
