= 1866 in poetry =

List of years in poetry	(table)
- … 1856; 1857; 1858; 1859; 1860; 1861; 1862; 1863; 1864; 1865; 1866; 1867; 1868; 1869; 1870; 1871; 1872; 1873; 1874; 1875; 1876 …
- In literature 1863 1864 1865 1866 1867 1868 1869
- Art; Archaeology; Architecture; Literature; Music; Philosophy; Science; +...

Nationality words link to articles with information on the nation's poetry or literature (for instance, Irish or France).

== Events ==
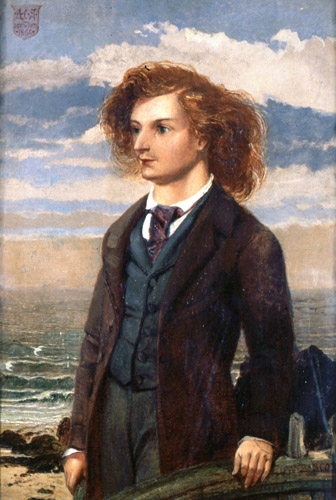
Algernon Charles Swinburne painted by William Bell Scott

- Charles Baudelaire's collection Les Épaves is published in Belgium containing poems suppressed from Les Fleurs du mal (Paris, 1857) for outraging public morality. His poems also appear in the first anthology by the "Parnassians", Le Parnasse contemporain, published this year.
- Giuseppe Gioachino Belli's sonnets in the Romanesco dialect of Rome (Sonetti Romaneschii, mostly written in the 1830s) are first published, posthumously in an expurgated selection by his son Ciro.
- First publications by the Romanian poet Mihai Eminescu, aged 16: In January Romanian teacher Aron Pumnul dies and his students in Cernăuţi publish a pamphlet, Lăcrămioarele învățăceilor gimnaziaști ("Tears of the Gymnasium Students") in which a poem entitled "La mormântul lui Aron Pumnul" ("At the Grave of Aron Pumnul") appears, signed "M. Eminovici"; on 25 February his poem "De-aș avea" ("If I were to have") is published in Iosif Vulcan's literary magazine Familia in Pest.
- Algernon Charles Swinburne's first collection Poems and Ballads causes a sensation on publication in London, especially the poems written in homage to Sappho and the sadomasochistic "Dolores (Notre-Dame des Sept Douleurs)", and, under threat of prosecution, his original publisher, Moxon and Co., transfer publication rights to the more liberal John Camden Hotten.

=== Ode on the Mammoth Cheese ===
In this year a masterpiece of cheese-making, a 7,000-pound Canadian behemoth produced in Perth, Ontario, and sent to exhibitions in Toronto, New York and Britain, is given its appropriate due in poetry by one James McIntyre (1828–1906), a Canadian known as "The Cheese Poet", whose work outlasts his subject and might even make its fame immortal. Herewith, an excerpt of his "Ode on the Mammoth Cheese Weighing Over 7,000 Pounds":

We have seen thee, Queen of Cheese,
Lying quietly at your ease,
Gently fanned by evening breeze;
Thy fair form no flies dare seize.

All gaily dressed, soon you'll go
To the provincial show,
To be admired by many a beau
In the city of Toronto.

from "Ode on the Mammoth Cheese"

McIntyre's poetry is the subject of books in the twentieth century, however, the greatest boost to his fame probably comes from a number of his poems being anthologized in the collection Very Bad Poetry, edited by Ross and Kathryn Petras (Vintage, 1997).

== Works published in English ==
=== United Kingdom ===
- Don Leon, falsely attributed to Lord Byron
- Sarah Elizabeth Carmichael, Poems
- Sir Francis Hastings Doyle, The Return of the Guards, and Other Poems
- John Henry Newman, The Dream of Gerontius
- Christina Rossetti, The Prince's Progress, and Other Poems
- Algernon Charles Swinburne, Poems and Ballads, first series, including "Dolores" (second series, 1878; third series, 1889)
- Benjamin Thorpe, assisted by Elise Otté, translation of the Poetic Edda as Edda Sæmundar Hinns Frôða: the Edda of Sæmund the Learned, from the old Norse or Icelandic
- George Yeld, Virgil reading his Æneid to Augustus and Octavia

=== United States ===
- Elizabeth Akers, Poems
- George Arnold, Drift: A Sea-Shore Idyl
- Fitz-Greene Halleck, Lines to the Recorder
- Herman Melville, Battle-Pieces and Aspects of the War
- George Henry Miles, Christine
- John Greenleaf Whittier:
  - Snow-Bound, United States
  - "Abraham Davenport", poem published in The Atlantic Monthly in May (text), about an incident involving Abraham Davenport

== Works published in other languages ==
=== French ===
==== France ====
- Théodore de Banville, Les Exilés
- François Coppée, Le Reliquaire
- Paul Verlaine, Poèmes saturniens, including "Chanson d'automne" ("Autumn Song")
- Le Parnasse contemporain ("The Contemporary Parnassus"), first of three volumes (Volume II 1871, Volume III 1876), including poems by Théophile Gautier, Théodore de Banville, Leconte de Lisle, Baudelaire, José-Maria de Heredia, François Coppée, Catulle Mendès, Sully Prudhomme, Paul Verlaine and Mallarmé

==== Belgium ====
- Baudelaire, Les Épaves, French poet published in Belgium

=== Other languages ===
- Girolamo de Rada, Rapsodi të një poeme arbëreshe, Arbëresh
- Estanislao del Campo, Fausto, satirical poem describing the impressions of a gaucho who attends Charles Gounod's opera Faust, and believes the events on stage to be happening in reality; Spanish-language, Argentina; an example of Gaucho literature

== Births ==
Death years link to the corresponding "[year] in poetry" article:

- 20 January – Richard Le Gallienne (died 1947), English poet
- 30 January – Gelett Burgess (died 1951), American humorist and poet
- 2 March – John Gray (died 1934), English aesthetic poet
- 26 March – Barcroft Boake (suicide 1892), Australian bush poet
- 11 April – Bernard O'Dowd (died 1953), Australian poet and co-founder of paper Tocsin
- 5 June – Edmund Vance Cooke (died 1932), Canadian-born American poet
- 16 August – Dora Sigerson (died 1918), Irish poet
- 12 November – Angiolo Silvio Novaro (died 1938), Italian poet and children's writer
- 3 December – Ethna Carbery, born Anna Johnston (died 1902), Irish poet
- 12 December – Edwin Greenslade Murphy (died 1939), Australian poet

== Deaths ==
Birth years link to the corresponding "[year] in poetry" article:

- 23 January – Thomas Love Peacock (born 1785), English satirical novelist and poet
- 31 January – Friedrich Rückert (born 1788), German poet, translator and professor of Oriental languages
- 29 March – John Keble (born 1792), English poet and cleric
- 18 May – Francis Sylvester Mahony ("Father Prout"; born 1804), Irish humorist and poet
- 12 August – Philip Stanhope Worsley (born 1835), English poet and translator

== See also ==
- 19th century in poetry
- 19th century in literature
- List of years in poetry
- List of years in literature
- Victorian literature
- French literature of the 19th century
- Poetry
