= John Robins (writer) =

Canadian academic and humorist (1884–1952)

John Daniel Robins
- Born: September 8, 1884; Windsor, Ontario, Canada
- Died: December 15, 1952 (aged 68); Middlesex County, Ontario, Canada
- Education: University of Chicago, University of Freiburg, University of Marburg, University of Toronto
- Occupations: Humorist, professor
- Spouse: Leila Isabella Douglas (m. 1917)
- Writing career
- Period: 20th century
- Genre: Humour

John Daniel Robins (September 8, 1884 - December 15, 1952) was a Canadian academic and humorist.

A longtime professor of German and English literature at the University of Toronto's Victoria University, he is noted for his book The Incomplete Anglers, which was co-winner with E. K. Brown's On Canadian Poetry of the Governor General's Award for English-language non-fiction at the 1943 Governor General's Awards.

== Early life and education ==
Robins was born in Windsor, Ontario, and educated at the University of Toronto and the University of Chicago. In 1914, he attended the University of Freiburg and the University of Marburg, both in Germany.

== Career ==
Robins returned to Toronto where he taught German at Victoria College.

In 1916, he resigned to enlist in the Canadian Army. He spent the next two years teaching musketry at Camp Borden in Ontario. He left the army in 1918 with the rank of company sergeant major.

Robins returned to teaching at Victoria College, eventually becoming a full professor in 1941. He obtained a Doctor of Philosophy degree from the University of Chicago in 1927.

In addition to The Incomplete Anglers, his other publications include the anthologies A Pocketful of Canada (1946) and A Book of Canadian Humor (1951), the novel Cottage Cheese (1951) and the posthumous short fiction collection Logging with Paul Bunyan (1957).

Robins served as a judge for the inaugural Stephen Leacock Award.

== Personal life ==
In 1917, Robins married Leila Isabella Douglas.
