= 1792 in poetry =

This article covers 1792 in poetry. Nationality words link to articles with information on the nation's poetry or literature (for instance, Irish or France).

== Works published ==
=== United Kingdom ===
- William Blake, Song of Liberty
- Maria Cowper, Original Poems on Various Occasions, a cousin of William Cowper, who helped her revise poems before publication
- Edward Jenningham, Stone Henge
- Janet Little, The Poetical Works of Janet Little, the Scotch Milkmaid
- Samuel Rogers, The Pleasures of Memory, 15 editions by 1806

=== Other ===
- Tomás António Gonzaga (as 'Dirceu'), Marília de Dirceu, first part, Brazil in Portuguese
- Francis Hopkinson, The Miscellaneous Essays and Occasional Writings of Francis Hopkinson, poetry and prose, posthumous, United States
- Thomas Odiorne, "The Progress of Refinement", philosophical long poem on man and nature, a precursor to later Romantic poetry, United States
- Rhijnvis Feith, Het Graf ("The Grave"), in four cantos, Netherlands

== Births ==
Death years link to the corresponding "[year] in poetry" article:

- January 1 – Henrik Anker Bjerregaard (died 1842), Norwegian poet, dramatist and judge
- February 10 – Ioan Tegid (John Jones, died 1852), Welsh clergyman, scholar and poet
- March 7 – John Herschel (died 1871), English polymath
- April 1 – Andreas Kalvos (Ἀνδρέας Κάλβος, died 1869), Greek Romantic poet, writer and translator
- April 25 – John Keble (died 1866), English churchman and poet
- May 4 – Dorothea Primrose Campbell (died 1863), Scottish poet and novelist
- August 4 – Percy Bysshe Shelley (died 1822), English Romantic poet and radical
- December 18 – William Howitt (died 1879), English historical writer and poet
- December 27 – Pietro Zorutti (Pieri Çorut, died 1867), Friulian poet
- Nodira (killed 1842), Uzbek poet and stateswoman

== Deaths ==
Birth years link to the corresponding "[year] in poetry" article:

- January – Jenny Clow ("Clarinda") (born 1766), Scottish domestic servant, a mistress and muse of Robert Burns, of tuberculosis
- John Edwards (born 1747), Welsh
- Georg Luis (born 1714), German

== See also ==
- Poetry
- List of years in poetry
