= Sadako Kurihara =

Japanese poet

Sadako Kurihara (栗原 貞子, Kurihara Sadako; March 4, 1913 – March 6, 2005) was a Japanese poet who lived in Hiroshima and survived the atomic bombing during World War II. She is best known for her poem Umashimenkana (Bringing Forth New Life).

== Biography ==
Kurihara was born Doi Sadako in Hiroshima city as the second daughter of a farming family. She attended Kabe High School from the age of 17 and began her literary activities there, writing mainly tanka and western-style poetry.

When the atomic bomb was exploded over Hiroshima she was in her home four kilometers north of the epicentre. After the war she took up writing professionally, along with her husband Kurihara Tadaichi, pursuing anti-war ideals. She became famous for her poems about her city, especially Bringing Forth New Life, which was first published in March 1946.

In 1960, Kurihara wrote an article titled "Auschwitz and Hiroshima: Concerning Literature of Hiroshima", which was published in the Chugoku Shimbun, where she dealt with the responsibility of writers in the field of commemoration. She founded Chugoku Bunmei Renmei (Chugoku Culture Association) and published the first issue of "Chugoku Bunka". Since then she has been deeply involved in the antinuclear movement through her literary activities. In 1969 Kurihara founded a citizens' group, "Gensuikin Hiroshima Haha no Kai" ("Hiroshima Mothers' Group against A-Bombs and H-Bombs"), and published an anthology of poetry about Hiroshima, "The River of Flame Running in Japan," which she distributed at the Sixth World Conference against A-Bombs and H-Bombs. The following year she started the journal, "The Rivers in Hiroshima," that continued through five bimonthly issues. In 1962 Kurihara organized a publishing committee and privately published "The Songs of Hiroshima" with parallel versions in English and Japanese. She also edited the journal, "Testimony of Hiroshima and Nagasaki" (1982), wrote essays (for example, "Embracing the Core Scene of Hiroshima," 1975), and attended numerous conferences, among them the NGO International Symposium in 1977 on "The Reality of the A-Bomb" and the 1982 International Literature Conference in Cologne, Germany. She was also involved in the 1983 Conference of Asian Writers in Hiroshima, protesting against nuclear development, poverty, and oppression.

Her publications include: "The Black Egg" ("Kuroi tamago," 1946), "The River of Flame Running in Japan" (1960), "The Songs of Hiroshima" (1962), "Watashi wa Hiroshima wo shogen suru" ("I, A Hiroshima Witness", 1967), "Dokyumento Hiroshima 24 nen" ("Documents about Hiroshima Twenty-Four Years Later," 1970), "Hiroshima to iu toki" ("When I Say Hiroshima," 1976), "The Future Begins Here" (1979), "Kakujidai ni ikiru" ("Living in Nuclear Age," essays, 1982), "Genbaku Kashu, Kushu" an anthology of tanka and haiku about the A-Bomb (1991), "Genbaku shishu," an anthology of poems about the A-Bomb (1991), "Hiroshima in Questions," essays (1992), and many others.

In 1990, Kurihara received the third annual Kiyoshi Tanimoto Peace Prize. She died of old age in her own home at the age of 92 in 2005.

In 2008, an exhibition of her manuscripts was opened at the Hiroshima Jogakuin University library.

She is survived by her daughter Mariko, born in 1935.

== "Bringing Forth New Life" ==
This poem is about a victim of the atomic bombing who suddenly goes into labour whilst taking refuge in an air-raid shelter. A midwife sharing the shelter goes to her aid, in spite of her own severe injuries, and so gives her own life to deliver the baby safely. It is based on real events witnessed by Kurihara in the shelter beneath the post office in Sendamachi, Hiroshima (in reality the midwife survived and later had a reunion with the child). The poem is considered a masterpiece and a representative work amongst atomic bomb poetry. It has been praised for its skillful contrast between the fading of one life and the birth of another, its expression of human strength in the face of tragedy, and its sense of hope for the future.

== Other works in Japanese ==
- 私は広島を証言する 詩集 詩集刊行の会 1967
- ヒロシマ24年 どきゅめんと 現代の救済 社会新報 1970 (新報新書)
- ヒロシマの原風景を抱いて 未來社 1975
- ヒロシマというとき 三一書房 1976
- 核・天皇・被爆者 三一書房 1978
- 未来はここから始まる ヒロシマ詩集 詩集刊行の会 1979
- 核時代に生きる ヒロシマ・死の中の生 三一書房 1982
- 核時代の童話 反核詩集 詩集刊行の会 1982
- 黒い卵 占領下検閲と反戦・原爆詩歌集 完全版 人文書院 1983
- 栗原貞子詩集 吉田欣一編 土曜美術社 1984 (日本現代詩文庫)
- ヒロシマ 詩と画で語りつぐ反核詩画集 吉野誠画 詩集刊行の会 1985
- 青い光が閃くその前に 反核詩画集 吉野誠画 詩集刊行の会 1986
- 問われるヒロシマ 三一書房 1992
- 栗原貞子全詩篇 土曜美術社出版販売 2005

== Publications ==
- Sadako Kurihara, "The Literature of Auschwitz and Hiroshima: Thoughts on Reading Lawrence Langer's The Holocaust and the Literary Imagination" Holocaust and Genocide Studies, Vol. 7, No. l, Spring 1993, pp. 77–106
