= E. K. Brown =

Canadian professor and literary critic

- Born: Edward Killoran Brown; August 15, 1905; Toronto, Ontario
- Died: February 24, 1953 (aged 47); Chicago, Illinois
- Citizenship: British subject
- Writing career
- Language: English
- Notable awards: Governor General's Award, Lorne Pierce Medal

Edward Killoran Brown (August 15, 1905 – April 24, 1951), who wrote as E. K. Brown, was a Canadian professor and literary critic. He "influenced Canadian literature primarily through his award-winning book On Canadian Poetry (1943)," which "established the standards of excellence and many of the subsequent directions of Canadian criticism." Northrop Frye called him "the first critic to bring Canadian literature into its proper context".

== Life ==
E.K. Brown was born in Toronto, the son of Winifred Killoran and Edward David Brown, a businessman. He graduated from the University of Toronto in 1926, winning the Governor-General's Medal for Modern Languages and a scholarship to the Sorbonne.

Brown taught at the University of Toronto from 1929 through 1941, except for two years chairing the University of Manitoba's English Department. He was an associate editor of the Canadian Forum from 1930 to 1933, and published over 50 articles in that journal.

Between 1932 and 1941 Brown was an editor of the University of Toronto Quarterly. In 1936 he began the column "Letters in Canada", an annual survey in the Quarterly of the year's crop of Canadian poetry. He left the University of Toronto in 1941 to take a position at Cornell University, but he continued to write "Letters in Canada" each year until 1950, at which time the column was taken over by Northrop Frye. Brown later used two of his "Letters in Canada" essays – "The Contemporary Situation in Canadian Literature" (1938) and "The Development of Canadian Poetry 1880-1940" (1941) – in his 1943 book, On Canadian Poetry.

In 1941 Brown edited a special all-Canadian issue of prestigious Chicago magazine Poetry.

From 1941 to 1944 Brown chaired Cornell University's English Department, except for six months on staff as a speechwriter to Canadian Prime Minister William Lyon Mackenzie King.

In 1943 Brown and Duncan Campbell Scott edited Archibald Lampman's posthumous volume, At the Long Sault and Other Poems. Brown would also edit Scott's posthumous Selected Poems in 1951.

In 1945 Brown moved to the University of Chicago to chair its English Department. From 1947 to 1951 he wrote a column, "Causeries," for the Winnipeg Free Press in which he published almost 50 essays on literary topics. He died in 1951 of cancer.

== Writing ==
=== On Canadian Poetry ===
Brown is best remembered for his 1943 book, On Canadian Poetry. Of that book, the Canadian Encyclopedia says that "Brown was the first modern Canadian critic to establish a context for the study of 19th- and 20th-century Canadian poetry by identifying Canada's major poets (Archibald Lampman, D.C. Scott and E. J. Pratt), tracing their influences and closely defining the strengths of their verse."

Prior to the appearance of On Canadian Poetry, Sir Charles G.D. Roberts was widely considered Canada's top poet (and certainly its top Confederation Poet), followed by his cousin, Bliss Carman. Not long before the volume came out, Brown had written to Duncan Campbell Scott that "our literary history must be rewritten and some old landmarks removed." In the book he removed several forthwith. Roberts received a mere four pages, and was praised mainly as a "breaker of trails". Carman received even less space; Brown saluted "the beauty of his music," but added that his poetry "as a whole is cloying." Of the other Confederation Poets, William Wilfred Campbell was cursorily dismissed as a "minor figure," while F.G. Scott and Pauline Johnson were not mentioned at all. In contrast, Brown devoted an entire chapter each to Lampman and D.C. Scott, building his own 'landmarks.'

Brown's revisionist ranking of the Confederation Poets – Lampman and Campbell Scott on top, Roberts and Carman underneath, and Wilfred Campbell, Johnson, and F.G. Scott not even counted – "would become widely accepted and go unchallenged for several decades.

== Recognition ==
Brown received a Governor General's Award for non-fiction in 1943 for On Canadian Poetry.

The Royal Society of Canada awarded E.K. Brown its Lorne Pierce Medal posthumously.

== Publications ==
=== Non-fiction ===
- E.M. Forster and the contemplative novel. Toronto, 1934.
- Edith Wharton, étude critique. Paris: E. Droz, 1935.
- Studies in the Text of Matthew Arnold's Prose Works. Paris: P. André, 1935.
- Swinburne: a centennial estimate. Toronto: 1937.
- On Canadian Poetry. Toronto: Ryerson, 1943.
- Matthew Arnold: A Study in Conflict. Chicago: U of Chicago P, 1948.
- Rhythm in the Novel. Toronto: University of Toronto Press, 1950. Lincoln, Neb.: University of Nebraska Press, 1978. ISBN 0-8032-1150-3 ISBN 0803260504
- Willa Cather: A Critical Biography. New York: Alfred A. Knopf, 1953.
- Responses and Evaluations: Essays on Canada. David Staines ed. Toronto: McClelland & Stewart (New Canadian Library), 1977. ISBN 0-7710-9252-0
- The Poet and the Critic: A Literary Correspondence Between D.C. Scott and E.K. Brown. Robert L. McCougall ed. McGill-Queen's U P, 1983. ISBN 0-88629-013-9 ISBN 0886290112

=== Translated ===
- Louis Cazamian, Carlyle. New York: Macmillan, 1932.
- Balzac, "Père Goriot". Père Goriot and Eugénie Grandet. New York: Modern Library, 1946.

=== Edited ===
- Matthew Arnold, Representative Essays. Toronto: Macmillan, 1936.
- Victorian Poetry.. Toronto: Nelson, 1942.
- Archibald Lampman, At the Long Sault and Other New Poems, Duncan Campbell Scott and E.K. Brown ed.. (Toronto: Ryerson, 1943).
- Matthew Arnold, Four Essays on Life and Letters. Harlan Davidson, 1947. ISBN 978-0-88295-006-8
- Charles Dickens David Copperfield. 1950.
- Duncan Campbell Scott, Selected Poems, E.K. Brown. ed. Toronto: Ryerson, 1951.

Except where noted, bibliographical information courtesy Open Library.
