= Anthony Hartley =

British writer and critic

- Born: 1925
- Died: 2000 (aged 74–75)
- Education: Exeter College, Oxford University
- Occupations: Writer, critic

Anthony Hartley (1925–2000) was a writer and critic. After studying at Exeter College, Oxford University he reviewed poetry for The Spectator. He moved to New York City in 1967. His books included A State of England (1963), and Gaullism: the Rise and Fall of a Political Movement (1972), and he edited The Penguin Book of French Verse in 1959.
