= 1943 Governor General's Awards =

Canadian literary award

The 1943 Governor General's Awards for Literary Merit were the eighth rendition of the Governor General's Awards, Canada's annual national awards program which then comprised literary awards alone. The awards recognized Canadian writers for new English-language works published in Canada during 1943 and were presented in 1944. There were no cash prizes.

As every year from 1942 to 1948, there two awards for non-fiction, and four awards in the three established categories, which recognized English-language works only.

== Winners ==
- Fiction: Thomas H. Raddall, The Pied Piper of Dipper Creek
- Poetry or drama: A. J. M. Smith, News of the Phoenix
- Non-fiction: John Daniel Robins, The Incomplete Anglers
- Non-fiction: E. K. Brown, On Canadian Poetry
