= Ndoc Gjetja =

Albanian poet

- Born: March 9, 1944; Bërdicë, Albania
- Died: June 7, 2010 (aged 66)
- Occupations: Poet, editor
- Writing career
- Language: Albanian
- Literary movement: Socialist realism

Ndoc Gjetja (March 9, 1944 – June 7, 2010) was an Albanian poet.

He was born in Bërdicë near Shkodër in north Albania, but moved to Lezhë at a young age.

His poetry collections include Rrezatim (Radiance) of 1971, followed by Shqiponja rreh krahët (The eagle flounces) of 1975, Qëndresa (Resistance) of 1977, E përditshme (Daily) of 1982, Çaste (Moments) of 1984, Poezi (Poetry) of 1987, Kthimet (The comebacks) of 1991, and Dhjata ime (My Testament) of 1998.
Gjetja's philosophy was "even though I have published seven poetry collections, I consider myself the author of a single one, which would be materialized as a selection of the best poetries I managed to create".
He is considered a humanist poet.
Gjetja served also for 13 years as editor-in-chief of the Skena dhe ekrani (The scene and the screen), an art magazine which used to come during the communist era.
He would settle later in Tirana, where he died in 2010 after a long illness.
