= Bringing Forth New Life =

1945 poem by Sadako Kurihara

Bringing Forth New Life (生ましめんかな, Umashimen kana) is a poem by Sadako Kurihara written in August 1945 in Hiroshima after the city's atomic bombing. It tells the true story of a woman giving birth to a baby amongst the ruins, while the midwife dies of burns and exhaustion in the process. This poem was first published in March 1946 in Chugoku Shimbun. The baby was named Kazuko Kojima (小嶋和子) and is still living in Hiroshima as of 2023. The midwife was Umeyo Miyoshi (三好梅代).

Alternate English titles for the poem are We Shall Bring Forth New Life and Let Us Be Midwives!
