= Shyam Narayan Pandey =

Shyam Narayan Pandey (1907–1991) was an Indian poet. His epic Jauhar, depicting the self-sacrifice of Rani Padmini, a queen of Chittor, written in a folk style, became very popular in the 1940s.

== Books ==
- Haldighati
- Jauhar
- Tumul
- Ruupantar
- Aarati
- Jai Parajay
- Gora Vadh
- Jai Hanuman
- Shivaji Mahakavya
- Prashuram

== See also ==
- Hindi Wikipedia
