= Ilona Karmel =

American writer (1925–2000)

- Born: August 14, 1925; Kraków, Poland
- Died: November 30, 2000 (aged 75); Cambridge, Massachusetts, U.S.
- Education: Radcliffe College, Massachusetts, US
- Occupations: English literature professor, writer, poet
- Spouse: Hans Zucker
- Writing career
- Language: English, Polish
- Years active: 1953–1995
- Genres: realistic fiction,
- Notable work: An Estate of Memory

Ilona Karmel (1925 – 2000) was an American writer of Polish Jewish origins who survived three Nazi concentration camps, moving after World War II to the US. She eventually became a creative writing professor at the Massachusetts Institute of Technology (MIT), which named an annual writing prize after her. She wrote two books, of which An Estate of Memory was considered one of the most important descriptions of the experiences of Jewish women during the Holocaust.

== Early life ==
Karmel was born to a middle-class Jewish family, Hirsch and Mita (Rosenbaum) Karmel, in Kraków in Poland on August 14, 1925. She and her sister, Henryka, also to become a writer, were students at the Hebrew Gymnasium in the city. After living at several addresses, they were moved with their mother in 1942 to the Kraków Ghetto, which was used as staging post for Jews to be transported to concentration camps. The three were then moved to the Kraków-Płaszów concentration camp and, in 1943, sent on to the Skarżysko-Kamienna concentration camp, which provided forced labour to the HASAG munitions factory. A year later they were sent to the Buchenwald concentration camp.

Having survived their time in labour camps, which Karmel attributed to her mother's protection, the two sisters spent two years in Stockholm while Karmel underwent rehabilitation, provided by the Swedish Red Cross. Right at the end of the war she had been hit by a German tank, and suffered severe injuries to her legs in an accident that killed her mother. During her time in Sweden, she studied English by correspondence course. In 1947, the sisters jointly issued a collection of poems Śpiew za drutami (Song Behind the Wire), which they had secretly written in the camps. These were published in New York City by a group of Polish Jewish refugees and reprinted in 2007. In 1948, Henryka emigrated to the US, to be followed by Ilona in 1949. She studied initially at Hunter College in New York City and then at Radcliffe College, a women's liberal arts college in Massachusetts, which in 1999 would be fully incorporated into Harvard University. There she was mentored by the poet Archibald MacLeish. Within four years of arriving in the US she had been awarded a BA in English (Phi Beta Kappa), had written the first draft of her novel Stephania, and had won the 1950 Mademoiselle College Fiction Contest for her story, Fru Holm.

== Writing and career ==
Karmel married Hans Zucker, a scientist of Austrian descent who had emigrated in 1938, and the couple lived in Belmont, Massachusetts. Her first novel was the semi-autobiographical Stephania, based on her period of convalescence, which became very well known at the time of its release in 1953. Because of her husband's work, she often travelled with him back to Europe and spent a long period in Munich working at an orphanage, where she began her second novel, An Estate of Memory. She had various other jobs, including teaching at a day-care centre, before being recruited to teach creative writing at the Massachusetts Institute of Technology (MIT) in 1979. An Estate of Memory was published in 1969 and has come to be regarded as one of the most important accounts of the experiences and lives of Jewish women during the Holocaust. It describes the struggle for survival of four unrelated women imprisoned in a Nazi labour camp in Poland. Their commitment to each other undergoes its greatest test when one becomes pregnant. Although The New York Times said that "like Solzhenitsyn, Ilona Karmel has succeeded in writing about life in the prison camps" as "plausible, possible human experience", early reviews of An Estate of Memory were varied. This is attributed to her technically challenging prose. It only received widespread acclaim when the Feminist Press reissued it in 1986, by which time it had been out of print for several years.

== Recognition ==
From 1979 to 1995, Karmel was a senior lecturer in creative writing at the Massachusetts Institute of Technology(MIT). She was particularly known at MIT for spending hours in private seminars with students, particularly black and Asian students. In May 1994, she received the Dean's Award for Distinguished Service. On her retirement in 1995, the annual MIT Writing Prize, which she had organized for many years, was given her name. Even though she did not produce further publications, her reputation continued to grow. Both Stephania and An Estate of Memory were translated into several languages, including German. The latter became viewed as one of the most significant novels in English to address the experiences of Jewish women during World War II.

In 2014, fifty of the benches in Planty Park in Kraków had a name plate added to them of an author connected with Kraków. Next to the name was a QR code, which enabled people to access brief information about the author and read an excerpt from the author's work. This was one of the activities associated with the Kraków UNESCO City of Literature celebrations of that year. Karmel and her sister were among those recognised in this way.

== Death ==
Karmel died from leukemia on November 30, 2000, at Mount Auburn Hospital in Cambridge, Massachusetts.
