= 1946 in poetry =

Nationality words link to articles with information on the nation's poetry or literature (for instance, Irish or France).

== Events ==
- March – Japanese poet Sadako Kurihara's "Bringing Forth New Life" (生ましめんかな, Umashimen-kana) is published. Publication this year of her first collection, The Black Egg (Kuroi tamago), is permitted during the occupation of Japan only in abridged form because of its treatment of the atomic bombing of Hiroshima experienced by the poet.
- May 20 – W. H. Auden becomes a United States citizen.
- Ezra Pound is brought back to the United States on treason charges but found unfit to face trial because of insanity and sent to St. Elizabeths Hospital in Washington, D.C., where he remains for 12 years (to 1958).
- Upon learning about Isaiah Berlin's visit to Russian poet Anna Akhmatova this year, Joseph Stalin's associate Andrei Zhdanov, with the approval of the Soviet Central Committee, issues the "Zhdanov decree" denouncing her as a "half harlot, half nun", and has her poems banned from publication. This resolution is directed against two literary magazines, Zvezda and Leningrad, which have published supposedly apolitical, "bourgeois", individualistic works of Akhmatova and the satirist Mikhail Zoshchenko. In time Akhmatova's son will spend his youth in Stalinist gulags and she will resort to publishing several poems in praise of Stalin to secure his release.
- Takashi Matsumoto founds a literary magazine, Fue ("Flute") in Japan.
- Martin Starkie founds Oxford University Poetry Society in Oxford, England.

=== MacSpaunday ===
- Roy Campbell, in his Talking Bronco, first published this year, invents the name "MacSpaunday" to designate a composite figure made up of the poets
  - Louis MacNeice ("Mac")
  - Stephen Spender ("sp")
  - W. H. Auden ("au-n")
  - Cecil Day-Lewis ("day")

Campbell, in common with much literary journalism of the period, imagines the four as a group of like-minded poets, although they share little but very broadly left-wing views.

== Works published in English ==
Listed by nation where the work was first published and again by the poet's native land, if different; substantially revised works listed separately:

=== Canada ===
- Louis Dudek. East of the City. Toronto: Ryerson Press, 1946.
- Robert Finch, Poems.
- Wilson MacDonald, Armand Dussault. Toronto: Macmillan.
- P. K. Page, As Ten As Twenty.
- A. J. M. Smith, ed. Seven Centuries of Verse.

=== India, in English ===
- Anilbaran, Songs from the Soul (Poetry in English), Calcutta: Amiya Library
- Harindranath Chattopadhyaya:
  - Edgeways and the Saint (Poetry in English) a farce; Bombay: Nalanda Publications
  - The Son of Adam (Poetry in English), Bombay: Padma Publications
- Nolini Kanta Gupta, East Beams (Poetry in English),
- P. R. Kaikini, Selected Poems (Poetry in English), Bombay
- H. G. Rawlinson, editor, Garland of Indian Poetry (Poetry in English), London: Royal India Society; anthology; Indian poetry published in the United Kingdom
- S. H. Vatsyayana, Prison Days and Other Poems (Poetry in English), Benares: Indian Publishers

=== New Zealand ===
- Allen Curnow, Jack Without Magic (Caxton), New Zealand
- Kendrick Smithyman, Seven Sonnets, Auckland: Pelorus Press
- J. C. Reid, Creative Writing in New Zealand, with two chapters on poetry, scholarship, New Zealand

=== United Kingdom ===
- Lilian Bowes Lyon, A Rough Walk Home
- Rupert Brooke, The Poetical Works of Rupert Brooke, comprising the contents of Collected Poems of 1928 and 26 additional poems; published posthumously
- Roy Campbell, Talking Bronco, South African native living in and published in the United Kingdom
- Walter De la Mare, The Traveller
- Lawrence Durrell, Cities, Plains and People
- Robert Graves, Poems 1938–1945
- Fredoon Kabraji, editor, This Strange Adventure: An Anthology of Poems in English by Indians 1828-1946, London: New India Pub. Co., 140 pages; Indian poetry published in the United Kingdom
- Maurice Lindsay, editor, Modern Scottish Poetry: An Anthology of the Scottish Renaissance 1920-1945 (Faber and Faber)
- Norman MacCaig, The Inward Eye
- Hugh MacDiarmid, pen name of Christopher Murray Grieve, Poems of the East-West Synthesis
- John Clark Milne, The Orra Loon and Other Poems.
- Kathleen Raine, Living in Time
- Herbert Read, Collected Poems
- Henry Reed, A Map of Verona, including "Naming of Parts"
- Vita Sackville-West, The Garden
- Sydney Goodsir Smith, The Devil's Waltz
- Bernard Spencer, Aegean Islands and Other Poems
- Dylan Thomas, Deaths and Entrances, including "Fern Hill" and "A Refusal to Mourn the Death, by Fire, of a Child in London"
- R. S. Thomas, The Stones of the Fields

=== United States ===
- Stephen Vincent Benét, The Last Circle (Houghton Mifflin)
- Elizabeth Bishop, North & South (Houghton Mifflin)
- Owen Dodson, Powerful Long Ladder
- H.D., "The Flowering of the Rod", the final part of Trilogy, a three-part poem on the experience of the blitz in wartime London
- John Gould Fletcher, The Burning Mountain
- Denise Levertov, The Double Image
- Robert Lowell, Lord Weary's Castle, New York: Harcourt, Brace
- Phyllis McGinley, Stones from a Glass House
- James Merrill, The Black Swan (won Glascock Prize)
- Josephine Miles, Local Measures
- Howard Moss, The Wound and the Weather
- Lorine Niedecker, New Goose, her first poetry collection
- Kenneth Patchen, Sleepers Awake
- Edouard Roditi, translator, Young Cherry Trees Secured Against Hares, translated from the original French of André Breton; publisher: View
- Mark Van Doren, The Country New Year
- William Carlos Williams, Paterson, Book I
- Reed Whittemore, Heroes & Heroines

=== Other in English ===
- Roy Campbell, Talking Bronco, South African native published in the United Kingdom
- Denis Devlin, Lough Derg and Other Poems, Irish poet published in the United States
- James McAuley, Under Aldebaran, Australia

== Works published in other languages ==
Listed by nation where the work was first published and again by the poet's native land, if different; substantially revised works listed separately:

=== France ===
- Yves Bonnefoy, Traité du pianiste
- Jean Cayrol, Poems de la nuit et du brouillard
- Aimé Césaire, Les armes miraculeuses, Martinique poet published in France; Paris: Gallimard
- René Char, Feuillets d'Hypnos
- Paul Éluard, Le dur désir de durer
- Léon-Paul Fargue, Méandres
- Jean Hervé, Jour, winner of the Prix Apollinaire
- Francis Jammes, La Grâce
- Pierre Jean Jouve, La Vierge de Paris poems from The Resistance
- Alphonse Métérié, Vétiver
- Jacques Prévert, Paroles
- Saint-John Perse:
  - Exil, suivi de Poème à l'etrangère, Pluies, Neiges
  - Vents, Paris: Gallimard
- Philippe Soupault, L'Arme secrète
- Jules Supervielle, 1939–1945
- Tristan Tzara, pen name of Sami Rosenstock, Terre sur Terre

=== Indian subcontinent ===
Including all of the British colonies that later became India, Pakistan, Bangladesh, Sri Lanka. And also from the country Nepal. Listed alphabetically by first name, regardless of surname:

==== Hindi ====
- Girija Kumar Mathur, Nas aur Nirman, poems of the Pragativadi school
- Ramadhari Singh Dinkar, Kuruksetra, narrative poem based on the Santi Parva of the Mahabharata
- Rangeya Raghava, Pighlate Patthar, poems with a strong Marxist influence

==== Kannada ====
- G. B. Joshi, Dattavani, critical appraisal of the poems of Kannada poet D. R. Bendre
- K. V. Puttappa, Prema Kasmira, 56 love poems
- V. K. Gokak, Indina Kannada Kavyada Gottugurialu, critical survey of modern poetry in Kannada

==== Kashmiri ====
- Mirza Arif, Laila Wa Mustafa, a masnavi
- Shamas-ud Din Kafoor, Nendre Lotuyae Yoot Koetah, a vatsun poem on the poverty of Kashmiri peasants; the work first appeared in Hamdard, a weekly periodical, and was later included in Payame Kafoor
- Abdul Ahad Azad, Shikwa-e-Iblis, a complaint about unquestioning social conformity

==== Tamil ====
- P. S. Subrahmaniya Shastri, Vatamoli Nul Varalaru, literary history of Sanskrit literature, written in Tamil
- R. P. Sethu Pillai, Kiristuvat Tamilttontar, Tamil-language literary history on the contributions of Christian scholars, including Beschi, Pope, Caldwell and Vitanayakam Pillai to that language's literature and culture
- V. R. M. Chettiyar, Nanku Kavimanikal, Tamil biographical and critical study of Percy Bysshe Shelley, John Keats, Rabindranath Tagore and the Tamil poet Kambar (poet), also known as "Kampan" (1180–1250)

==== Other Indian languages ====
- Akhtarul Imam, Tarik Sayyara; Urdu-language
- Amrita Pritan, Pathar Gite; Punjabi-language
- Bayabhav, also known as Kashinath Shridhar Naik, Sadeavelim Fulam, Konkani
- Buddhadeb Basu, Kaler Putul, an essay of literary criticism in Bengali of poets and their work after Rabindranath Tagore
- Chaganti Seshaiah, Andhra Kavi Tarangini, first volume in a 10-volume literary history written in the Telugu language (the last volume came out in 1953)
- Chandrasinha, Sip, nine works of poetic prose in Rajasthani
- Dinu Bhai Pant, Mangu Di Chabila, Dogri narrative poem on bonded laborers exploited by village money lenders
- E. M. S. Nampudirippadu, Purogamana Sahityam an essay in Malayalam by a leader of the Marxist Communist Party on the idea of progressive literature; influential with many young authors
- Ishar Singh Ishar, Rangila Bhaia, humorous, Punjabi-language poems featuring Bhaia, a humorous character created by the poet for this and other works
- Jandhyala Papayya Sastry, Vijaya Sri, popular kavya in classical meter about the victory of Arjuna; an allegory of the Indian independence movement; Telugu
- Laksmiprasad Devkota, Sulocana, Nepali-language epic using more than a dozen Sanskrit meters; the poem, written in response to a challenge to prove the author's credentials as an epic poet, does not defy the norms of epics in Sanskrit poetics; based on a social theme
- Mayadhar Mansinha, Sadhabajhia, Oriya-language, romantic poetry
- Sundaram, Arvacin Kavita, literary history in Gujarati of that language's poetry from 1845 to 1945

=== Other languages ===
- Josef Čapek, Básně z koncentračního tabora ("Poems from a Concentration Camp"), Czech, published posthumously
- Hushang Ebtehaj (H. E. Sayeh) نخستین نغمه‌ها ("The First Songs"), Persian poet published in Iran
- Odysseus Elytis, An Heroic And Funeral Chant For The Lieutenant Lost In Albania, Greek
- G. Groll, editor, De profundis, anthology of non-Nazi texts, Germany
- Ilmar Laaban, Ankruketi lõpp on laulu algus, Estonian poet published in Sweden
- Pier Paolo Pasolini, I Diarii ("The Diaries"), Italy

== Awards and honors ==
=== Awards and honors in the United States ===
- Consultant in Poetry to the Library of Congress (later the post would be called "Poet Laureate Consultant in Poetry to the Library of Congress"): Karl Shapiro appointed this year
- Pulitzer Prize for Poetry: No award given
- Fellowship of the Academy of American Poets: Edgar Lee Masters

=== Awards and honors elsewhere ===
- France: Académie française: Paul Claudel elected, April 4
- Canada: Governor General's Award, poetry or drama: Poems, Robert Finch

== Births ==
Death years link to the corresponding "[year] in poetry" article:

- February 7 – Brian Patten, English member of the Liverpool poets
- February 8 – Gert Jonke (died 2009), Austrian novelist, playwright, screenwriter and poet
- April 26 – Marilyn Nelson, American
- May 8 – Ruth Padel, English poet and writer
- May 10 – Chandiroor Divakaran, Indian Malayalam language poet and folk-song writer
- June 2 – Sean Street, British radio broadcaster and poet
- June 28 – John Birtwhistle, English poet and librettist
- July 27 – Peter Reading (died 2011), English
- August 5 – Ron Silliman, American
- August 9 – Juris Kronbergs (died 2020), Latvian-Swedish poet and translator
- September 9 – Maura Stanton, American
- September 30 – Larry Levis (died 1996), American
- October 14 – Alan Brunton (died 2002), New Zealand poet and scriptwriter
- October 28 – Sharon Thesen, Canadian
- December 20 – Andrei Codrescu, a Romanian-born American poet, novelist, essayist, screenwriter, and commentator for NPR
- December 30 – Patti Smith, American poet and musician
- Also:
  - Tom Pickard, English poet, radio broadcaster, film maker and an initiator of the British Poetry Revival movement
  - Joachim Sartorius, German

== Deaths ==
Birth years link to the corresponding "[year] in poetry" article:

- January 9 – Countee Cullen, 42 (born 1903), African American poet
- March 1 – Adriana Porter, 89 (born 1857), Wiccan poet
- March 26 – Amir Hamzah, 35 (born 1911), Indonesian poet styled a national hero
- May 25 – Ernest Rhys, 87 (born 1859), British poet, author, novelist, essayist best known for his role as founding editor of the Everyman's Library series of affordable classics
- July 8 – Orrick Glenday Johns, 59 (born 1887), American poet and playwright
- July 27 – Gertrude Stein, 73 (born 1874), American poet and dramatist, of cancer
- August 18
  - Marion Angus, 81 (born 1865), Scottish poet
  - Amulya Barua, 24 (born 1922), Assamese poet first published posthumously this year, killed in communal violence
- September 9 – Violet Jacob, 83 (born 1863), Scottish historical novelist and poet
- November 18 – Walter J. Turner, 62 (born 1884), Australian-born British poet and music critic
- November 29 – Johannes Vares (Barbarus), 56 (born 1890), Estonian poet, doctor and radical politician, suicide

== See also ==
- Poetry
- List of poetry awards
- List of years in poetry
