= George Barlow (English poet) =

English poet

- Born: 19 June 1847; London
- Died: 26 December 1913 (aged 66)
- Occupation: poet

George Barlow (19 June 1847 – 26 December 1913) was an English poet, who sometimes wrote under the pseudonym James Hinton.

Barlow was born in London, the posthumous son of George Barne Barlow, assistant Master of the Crown Office, who died a month before his birth. He was educated at Harrow School and Exeter College, Oxford. He moved to London in 1871, and continued to live there after his marriage a year later. A prolific poet, his collected Poetical Works amounted to over 3,000 pages of verse. Barlow was dubbed the 'Bard of the sixteen sonnets a day' by his acquaintance Charles Marston, and 'the Poet of spiritualism' by Edward Bennett; his sonnet sequences explored spiritualism and erotic love.

In addition to his published poetry oeuvre, Barlow wrote at least two non-fiction books, History of the Dreyfus case (1898) and The genius of Dickens. He was a regular contributor to the Contemporary Review.

== Works ==
- A life's love, [1873]. New edition, 1882
- (as James Hinton), An English madonna, 1874
- Under the dawn, 1875
- The gospel of humanity: or the connection between spiritualism and modern thought, 1876
- The marriage before death, and other poems, 1878
- The two marriages, a drama in three acts, 1878
- Through death to life, 1878
- To Gertrude in the Spirit World, 1878
- Love-songs, 1880
- Time's whisperings: sonnets and songs, 1880
- Song-bloom, 1881
- Song-spray, 1882
- An actor's reminiscences, and other poems, 1883
- (as James Hinton), Love's offering, 1883
- Poems real and ideal, 1884
- Loved beyond words, 1885
- The pageant of life: an epic poem in five books, 1888. New edition, 1910
- From dawn to sunset, 1890
- A lost mother, 1892
- The crucifixion of man: a narrative poem, 1893. Second edition, 1895
- Jesus of Nazareth, a tragedy, [1896]
- Woman regained. A novel of artistic life, 1896
- The daughters of Minerva. A novel of artistic life, [1898]
- A history of the Dreyfus case : from the arrest of Captain Dreyfus in October, 1894, up to the flight of Esterhazy in September, 1898, 1899
- To the women of England, and other poems, 1901
- The Poetical Works of George Barlow, London: Henry Glaisher, 11 vols, 1902–14
- A coronation poem, 1902
- Vox clamantis: sonnets and poems, 1904
- The higher love. A plea for a noble conception of human love, 1905. Reprinted from the Contemporary Review.
- The triumph of woman, prose essays, 1907
- A man's vengeance, and other poems, 1908
- The genius of Dickens, 1909. Reprinted from the Contemporary Review.
- Songs of England awaking, 1909. Second edition, 1910
- Selected poems, 1921. With note by C. W., bibliography and short life.
