= Mary Ashley Townsend =

American poet

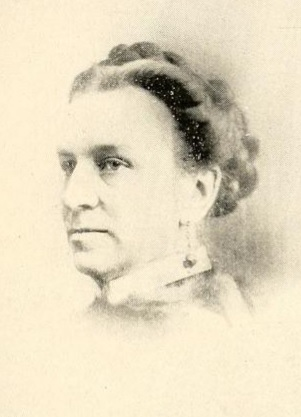
- Mary Ashley Townsend, circa 1897
- Born: Mary Ashley Van Voorhis; 1836; Lyons, New York, U.S.
- Died: June 7, 1901 (aged 64–65)

Mary Ashley Townsend (pen name, Xariffa; 1836 – June 7, 1901) was an American poet and writer. She was the first American invited to join the "Liceo Hidalgo", a prestigious Mexican literary club.

== Biography ==
Mary Ashley Van Voorhis was born in Lyons, New York in 1836 (some sources say 1832). She was educated in her native town and married Gideon Townsend, of New Orleans, Louisiana.

She began to write for publication in about 1856 and, under the pen-name of "Xariffa", earned a reputation as the author of "Quillotypes", a series of humorous papers that appeared in the New Orleans "Delta" and were widely copied by the southern and western press. Her other works are The Brother Clerks (1859), Poems (1870), The Captain's Story (1874), and Down the Bayou, and other Poems (1884). Among her short poems are "Creed", which was copied in newspapers in England as well as the United States, "A Woman's Wish", "The Bather", and "The Wind".

She was appointed to deliver the official poem on the opening of the New Orleans exposition in 1884, and that at the unveiling of the statue of General Albert Sidney Johnston in 1887.

She was the first American invited to join the "Liceo Hidalgo", a prestigious Mexican literary club.

== Critical reception ==
Her work gained "high critical acclaim in the 1870s and 1880s". By 1916, fifteen years after her death, an article in A History of American Literature said, "Her humorous sketches in prose are forgotten, but her mildly sentimental poems hold for her a place in the anthologies." She is mentioned in The History of Southern Women's Literature (2002) for her work having freshness and genuineness in dealing with traditional subjects.

== Selected works ==
- The Brother Clerks (1859)
- Poems (1870)
- The Captain's Story (1874)
- Down the Bayou, and other Poems (1884)
