= Jean Charbonneau =

French-Canadian poet

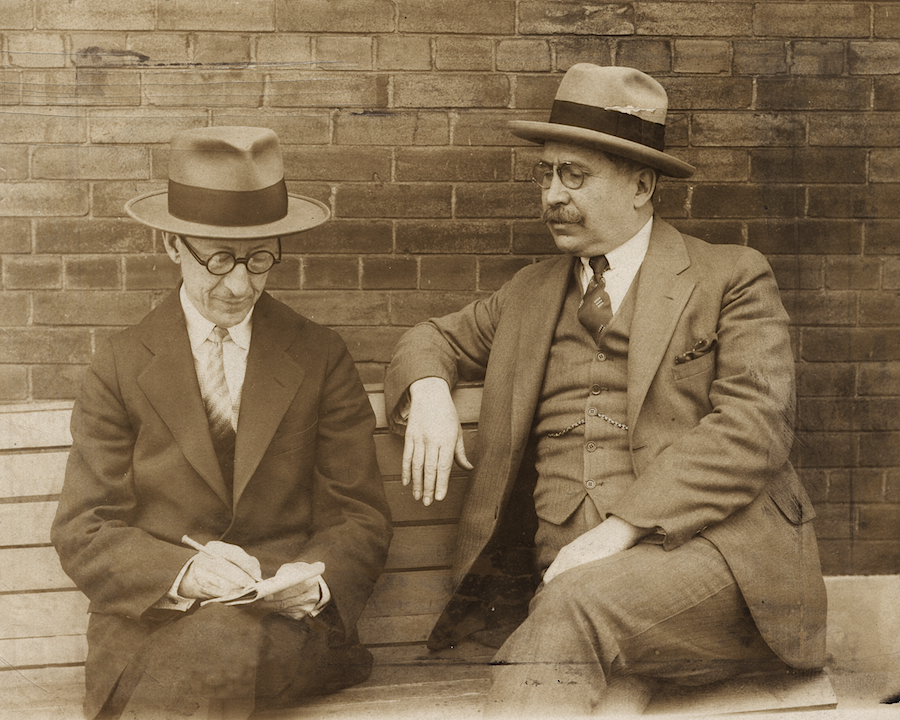
- Paul de Martigny and Jean Charbonneau, circa 1930
- Born: 1875; Montreal, Quebec, Canada
- Died: 25 October 1960 (aged 84–85); Saint-Eustache, Quebec
- Occupation: Poet

Jean Charbonneau (1875 – 25 October 1960) was a French-Canadian poet who was the main founder of the Montreal Literary School.

== Publications ==
- 1912: Les blessures , Paris, Lemerre
- 1916–1920: Des influences françaises au Canada (three volumes), Montréal, Beauchemin
- 1921: L'Âge de Sang, Paris, Lemerre
- 1923: Les Prédestinés, Montréal, Beauchemin
- 1924: L'Ombre dans le miroir, Montréal, Beauchemin
- 1928: La Flamme ardente, Montréal, Beauchemin
- 1935: L'école littéraire de Montréal; Ses origines, ses animateurs, ses influences. Éditions Albert Lévesque. 1935.
- 1940: Tel qu'en sa solitude... Poèmes, Montréal, Éditions B. Valiquette, Éditions A.C.F.
