= 1875 in poetry =

This article covers 1875 in poetry. Nationality words link to articles with information on the nation's poetry or literature (for instance, Irish or France).

== Events ==
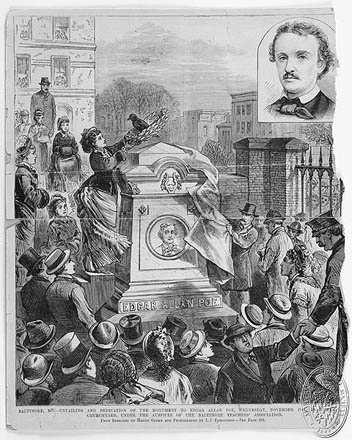
Edgar Allan Poe's reburial and new monument, Oct. 1, 1875.

- February/March - Arthur Rimbaud meets Paul Verlaine for the last time in Stuttgart, Germany, after Verlaine's release from prison, gives him the manuscript of his poems Illuminations and gives up literary writing entirely at the age of 20.
- October 1 - American poet and short story writer Edgar Allan Poe is reburied in Westminster Hall and Burying Ground, Baltimore, Maryland, with a larger memorial marker. Some controversy arises years later as to whether the correct body was exhumed.
- December 6 - German emigrant ship SS Deutschland runs aground in the English Channel resulting in the death of 157 passengers and crew and inspiring Gerard Manley Hopkins' poem The Wreck of the Deutschland. This introduces his innovative sprung rhythm and metre but, being rejected for publication in 1876, is not published until 1918.

== Works published in English ==
=== United Kingdom ===
- George Barlow, Under the Dawn
- Wilfrid Scawen Blunt, published under the pen name "Proteus", Sonnets and Songs (see also Love Sonnets 1881, Love Lyrics 1892)
- Robert Browning, Aristophanes' Apology
- Alice Meynell, Preludes
- Sir Henry Taylor, A Sicilian Summer; St. Clement's Eve; The Eve of the Conquest

=== United States ===
- William Cullen Bryant, Poems
- Will Carleton, Farm Legends
- Christopher Pearse Cranch, The Bird and the Bell
- Richard Watson Gilder, The New Day
- Paul Hamilton Hayne, The Mountain of the Lovers
- Oliver Wendell Holmes, Songs of Many Seasons
- Henry Wadsworth Longfellow, The Masque of Pandora and Other Poems
- Helen A. Manville, Heart Echoes
- John Godfrey Saxe, Leisure-Day Rhymes
- Bayard Taylor, Home Pastorals, Ballads, and Lyrics
- John Greenleaf Whittier, Hazel-Blossoms

== Works published in other languages ==
- Hristo Botev and Stefan Stambolov, „Пѣсни и стихотворения отъ Ботйова и Стамболова“ (Songs and Poems by Botev and Stambolov), Bulgarian poets published in Romania
- François Coppée, Olivier
- Holger Drachmann, Dæmpede Melodier ("Muffled Melodies"), Denmark
- French translation of Edgar Allan Poe's "The Raven", by Stéphane Mallarmé with drawings by Édouard Manet

== Births ==
Death years link to the corresponding "[year] in poetry" article:

- January 4 – William Williams (Crwys) (died 1968), Welsh poet
- March 30 – Edmund Clerihew Bentley (died 1956), popular English novelist and humorist and inventor of the clerihew, an irregular form of humorous pseudo-biographical verse
- June 8 (May 27 O.S.) – Ernst Enno (died 1934), Estonian poet
- July 19 – Alice Dunbar-Nelson (died 1935) African-American poet, journalist and political activist and part of the Harlem Renaissance; her husband Paul Laurence Dunbar is also a poet
- July 26 – Antonio Machado (died 1939), Spanish poet
- August – Fannie B. Linderman (died 1960), American poet, writer, educator, entertainer
- November 3 – Samukawa Sokotsu 寒川鼠骨(died 1954), Japanese Haiku poet of Meiji period, Masaoka Shiki's pupil
- November 8 – Qiu Jin (executed 1907), Chinese revolutionary, feminist and poet
- December 4 – Rainer Maria Rilke (died 1926) who will be called one of the greatest 20th-century poets in German
- December 8 – Yone Noguchi 野口米次郎 (died 1947), Japanese poet, fiction writer, essayist, and literary critic in both English and Japanese; father of the sculptor Isamu Noguchi
- December 15 – Emilio Jacinto (died 1899), Filipino revolutionary general and poet
- Also:
  - Jean Charbonneau (died 1960) French Canadian poet, primary founder of the Montreal Literary School
  - Percy MacKaye (died 1956), American dramatist and poet

== Deaths ==
Birth years link to the corresponding "[year] in poetry" article:

- January 22 – Charles Sprague, 83, American banker and poet
- January 23 – Charles Kingsley, 55, English novelist and poet
- June 4 – Eduard Mörike, 70, German Romantic poet
- October 24 – Raffaello Carboni (born 1817), Australian
- December 3 – Robert Stephen Hawker, 71, English poet, antiquarian of Cornwall, Anglican clergyman and reputed eccentric best known as the author of Cornwall's "national anthem" "The Song of the Western Men"
- December 10 – Ōtagaki Rengetsu 太田垣蓮月, member of the Todo family who took "Rengetsu" ("Lotus Moon") as her Buddhist name when she became a nun, and is known as "Rengetsu" (born 1791), Buddhist nun, widely regarded to have been one of the greatest Japanese poets of the 19th century; potter, painter and expert calligrapher

== See also ==
- 19th century in poetry
- 19th century in literature
- List of years in poetry
- List of years in literature
- Victorian literature
- French literature of the 19th century
- Poetry
