= The Chugoku Shimbun =

Newspaper in Hiroshima, Japan

- Front page of The Chugoku Shimbun on August 6, 2023
- Native name: 中国新聞
- Type: Daily newspaper
- Owner(s): The Chugoku Shimbun Co., Ltd.
- Founded: May 5, 1892
- Political alignment: Center-left
- Language: Japanese
- Headquarters: Hiroshima
- Website: www.chugoku-np.co.jp

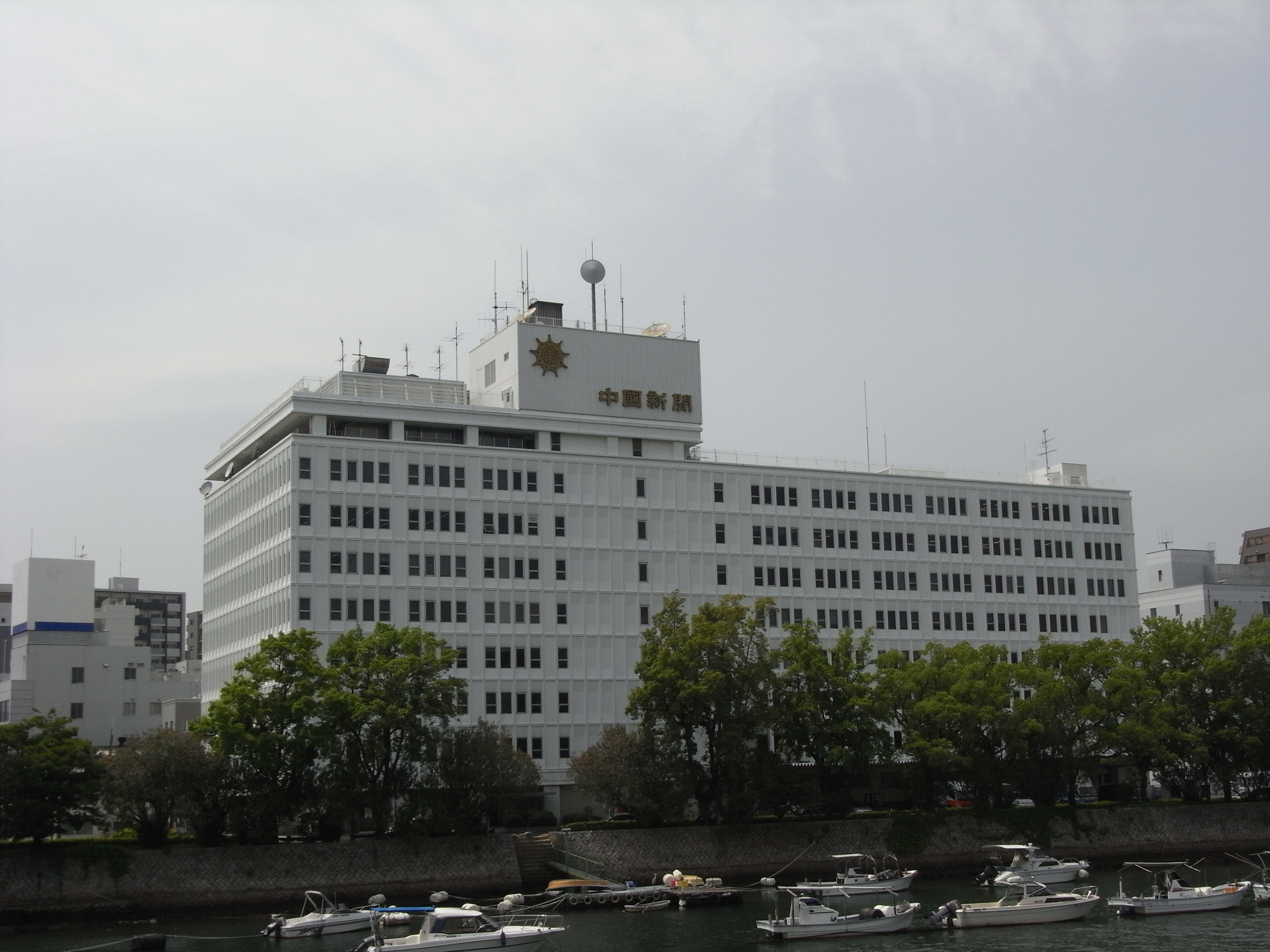
Headquarters of Chugoku Shimbun in Hiroshima

The Chugoku Shimbun (Japanese: 中国新聞, Hepburn: Chūgoku Shinbun; "Midland News") is a Japanese local daily newspaper based in Hiroshima. It serves the Chūgoku region of Japan with a market share in Hiroshima, Yamaguchi, Shimane, Okayama and Tottori Prefectures. The newspaper publishes morning and evening editions. The morning paper has a daily circulation of 487,981.

== History ==
The Daily Chugoku was established on May 5, 1892, in Hiroshima and was founded by its editor, Saburo Yamamoto. In 1908, the newspaper changed its name to The Chugoku Shimbun, which translates to "Middle Country Newspaper" (geographically, Hiroshima is near the center of the Japanese archipelago). The A-Bomb on August 6, 1945, killed 113 newspaper employees, and destroyed the building and equipment. The newspaper restarted publishing on August 9 by asking other newspapers for help.
