= 1874 in poetry =

God grant that the reader, emboldened and having become at present as fierce as what he is reading, find, without loss of bearings, his way, his wild and treacherous passage through the desolate swamps of these sombre, poison-soaked pages; for, unless he should bring to his reading a rigorous logic and a sustained mental effort at least as strong as his distrust, the lethal fumes of this book shall dissolve his soul as water does sugar.

— Opening passage of Les Chants de Maldoror by Comte de Lautréamont (pen name of Isidore Lucien Ducasse)

This article covers 1874 in poetry. Nationality words link to articles with information on the nation's poetry or literature (for instance, Irish or France).

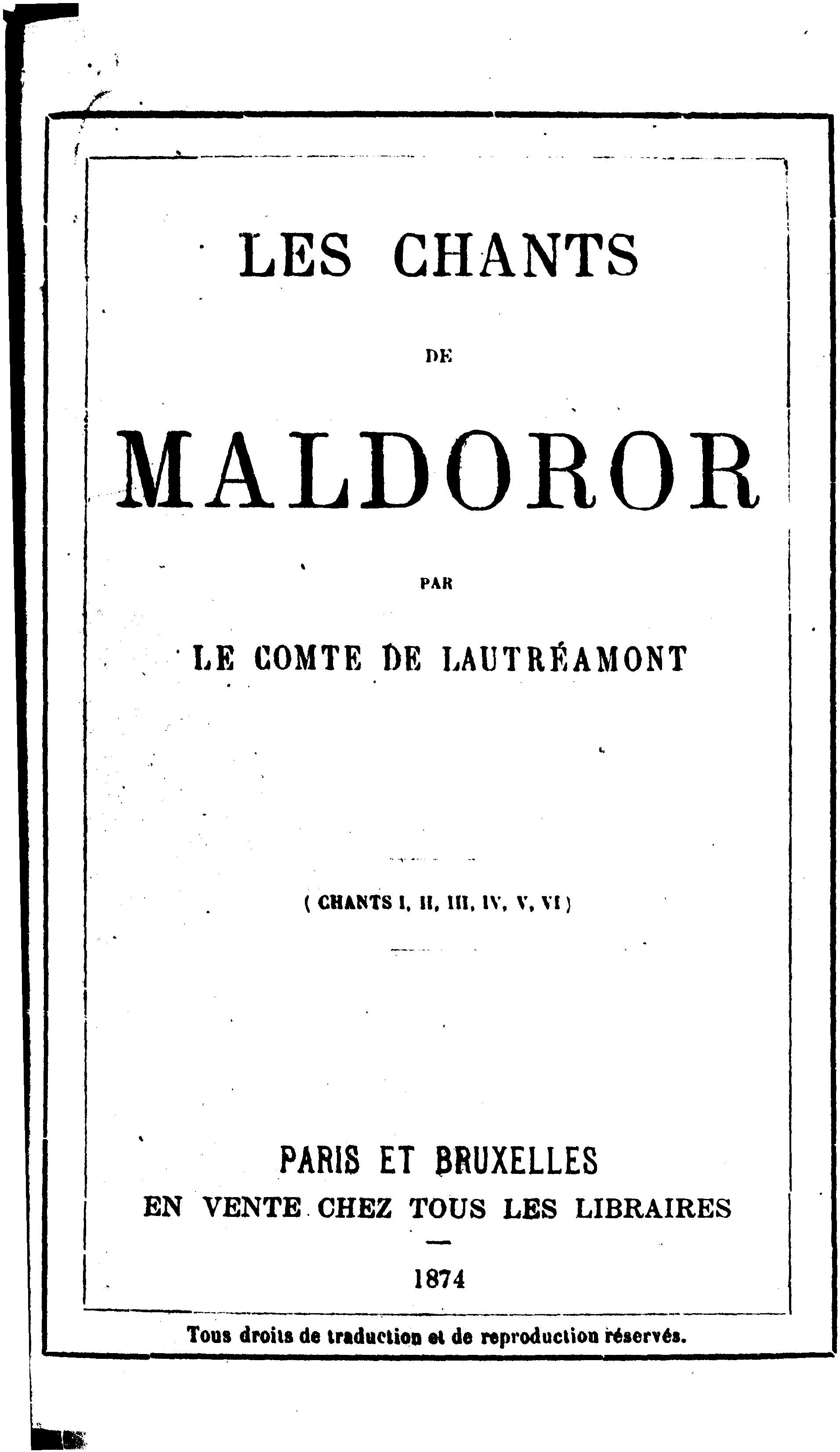
Title page of Les Chants de Maldoror by Comte de Lautréamont

== Works published in English ==
=== United Kingdom ===
- Alfred Austin, The Tower of Babel
- Robert William Dale, The English Hymn Book
- Edward Bulwer-Lytton, Fables in Song
- Arthur O'Shaughnessy, Music and Moonlight
- James Thomson, The City of Dreadful Night, published in the National Reformer, and later in 1880

=== United States ===
- Thomas Bailey Aldrich, Cloth of Gold and Other Poems
- William Cullen Bryant, Among the Trees
- Mary Mapes Dodge, Rhymes and Jingles
- Henry Wadsworth Longfellow:
  - Editor, Poems of Places, anthology, United States
  - The Hanging of the Crane
- Mary Ashley Townsend, The Captain's Story

== Works published in other languages ==
=== France ===
- François Coppée, Le Cahier rouge
- Arthur Rimbaud, Illuminations, France
- Comte de Lautréamont, pen name of Isidore Lucien Ducasse, Les Chants de Maldoror, prose poems full of Gothic horror (first published in full this year; originally published in parts in 1868 and 1869); France
- Paul Verlaine, Romances sans paroles, France

== Births ==
Death years link to the corresponding "[year] in poetry" article:

- January 16 – Robert William Service, "the Bard of the Yukon" (died 1958), Scots-Canadian poet, writer of "The Shooting of Dan McGrew" and "The Cremation of Sam McGee"
- February 3 – Gertrude Stein (died 1946), American writer, poet and catalyst in the development of modern art and literature; spends most of her life in France
- February 7 – Olive Custance (died 1944), English poet
- February 9 – Amy Lowell (died 1925), American poet of the imagist school, posthumous winner of the Pulitzer Prize for Poetry in 1926
- February 20 – Gordon Bottomley (died 1948), English poet known particularly for his verse dramas
- February 22 – Kyoshi Takahama 高浜 虚子, pen name of Kiyoshi Takahama (died 1959), Japanese, Shōwa period poet; close disciple of Masaoka Shiki (surname: Takahama)
- March – Stanley de Vere Alexander Julius (died 1930), English military officer and poet
- March 26 – Robert Frost (died 1963), American poet
- April 27 – Maurice Baring (died 1945), English poet, novelist, translator, essayist, travel writer and war correspondent
- May 29 – G. K. Chesterton (died 1936), influential English writer, journalist, poet, biographer, Christian apologist, short story writer and novelist
- May 30 – Josephine Preston Peabody (died 1922), American poet and playwright
- June 20 – Trumbull Stickney (died 1904), American classical scholar and poet best known for his sonnets
- July 7 – José María Eguren (died 1942), Peruvian symbolist poet
- July 29 – August Stramm (killed in action 1915), German Expressionist poet and playwright
- August 19 – A. H. Reginald Buller (died 1944), British/Canadian mycologist mainly known as a researcher of fungi and wheat rust; also writer of limericks, some of which are published in Punch
- September 8 – Yone Noguchi 野口米次郎 (died 1947), Japanese poet, fiction writer, essayist and literary critic in both English and Japanese; father of the sculptor Isamu Noguchi
- October 6 – Ursula Bethell (died 1945) (New Zealand)
- November 27 – Ridgely Torrence (died 1950), American poet and editor
- November 30 – Lucy Maud Montgomery (died 1942), Canadian author and poet best known for a series of novels beginning with Anne of Green Gables
- Also:
  - Kalapi (died 1900), Indian, Gujarati-language poet
  - R. H. Long (died 1948), Australian
  - J. W. Gordon (Jim Grahame) (died 1949), Australian

== Deaths ==
Birth years link to the corresponding "[year] in poetry" article:

- February 23 – Charles Shirley Brooks, 57 (born 1816), English journalist, novelist and poet
- April 12 (probable date) – Ellen Johnston, "the factory girl" (born c. 1835), Scottish power loom weaver and poet
- August 22 – Sydney Thompson Dobell, 50 (born 1824), English poet and critic
- October 5 – Bryan Procter (pen name: Barry Cornwall), 86 (born 1787), English poet

== See also ==
- 19th century in poetry
- 19th century in literature
- List of years in poetry
- List of years in literature
- Victorian literature
- French literature of the 19th century
- Poetry
