= List of Australian poets =

The poets listed below were either citizens or residents of Australia or published the bulk of their poetry whilst living there.

== A ==
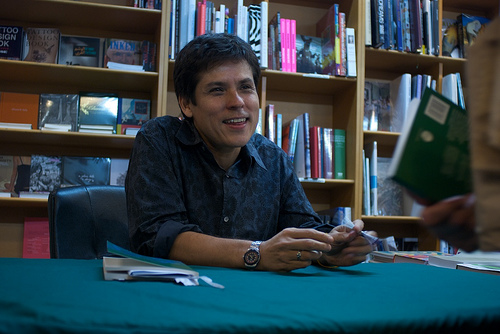
Adam Aitken

- J. H. M. Abbott (1874–1953)
- Arthur Henry Adams (1872–1936) originally from New Zealand
- Robert Adamson (1943–2022)
- Adam Aitken (born 1960)
- Jordie Albiston (1961–2022)
- Kaye Aldenhoven (living)
- Elizabeth Allen (born 1977)
- James Alexander Allan (1889–1956)
- Leslie Holdsworth Allen (1879–1964)
- Richard James Allen (born 1960)
- Ivy Alvarez (living) born in Philippines, now in New Zealand
- Richard Appleton (1932–2005)
- Ethel Anderson (1883–1958)
- Evelyn Araluen (living)
- Robyn Archer (born 1948)
- Timoshenko Aslanides (1943–2020)
- Tilly Aston (1873–1947)
- Cassandra Atherton (living)
- Rupert Atkinson (1881–1961)
- Dorothy Auchterlonie (1915–1991)

== B ==
- Peter Bakowski (born 1954)
- Gina Ballantyne (1919–1973)
- Lex Banning (1921–1965)
- Stuart Barnes (born 1977)
- Arthur Bayldon (1865–1958)
- William Baylebridge (1883–1942)
- Eric Beach (1947–2024)
- Bruce Beaver (1928–2004)
- Ruth Bedford (1882–1963)
- Jack Bedson (born 1950)
- Lisa Bellear (1961–2006)
- Judith Beveridge (born 1956)
- Dora Birtles (1903–1992)
- Leigh Blackmore (born 1959)
- Peter Bladen (1922–2001)
- John Blight (1913–1958)
- Barcroft Boake (1866–1892)
- Merlinda Bobis (born 1959)
- Ken Bolton (born 1949)
- Henry Ernest Boote (1865–1949)
- Jenny Boult (aka MML Bliss) (1951–2005)
- John Philip Bourke (1860–1914)
- Peter Boyle (born 1951)
- Michael Boyd (born 1958)
- Francis Brabazon (1907–1984)
- James Bradley (born 1967)
- E. J. Brady (1869–1952)
- Bertha Southey Brammall (1878–1957)
- John Jefferson Bray (1912–1995)
- Christopher Brennan (1870–1932)
- Michael Brennan (born 1973)
- John Le Gay Brereton (1871–1933)
- Lily Brett (born 1946)
- David Brooks (born 1953)
- Pam Brown (born 1948)
- Mary Grant Bruce (1878–1958)
- Vincent Buckley (1925–1988)
- Charles Buckmaster (1950–1972)
- Andrew Burke (1944–2023)
- Joanne Burns (born 1945)

== C ==
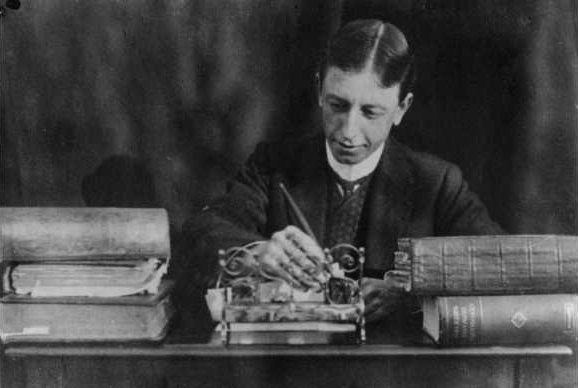
C. J. Dennis

- Caroline Caddy (born 1944)
- Adrian Caesar (born 1955)
- Ada Cambridge (1844–1926)
- David Campbell (1915–1979)
- Elizabeth Campbell (born 1980)
- Raffaello Carboni (1817–1875)
- A.J. Carruthers (born 1987)
- Lee Cataldi (born 1942)
- Nancy Cato (1917–2000)
- James Charlton (born 1947)
- Eileen Chong (born 1980)
- Hubert Church (1857–1932)
- Ross Clark (born 1953)
- Marcus Clarke (1846–1881)
- Justin Clemens (born 1969)
- Ali Cobby Eckermann (born 1963)
- Robbie Coburn (born 1994)
- Hal Colebatch (1945–2019)
- Aidan Coleman (born 1976)
- Laurence Collinson (1925–1986)
- Anna Couani (born 1948)
- Robert Crawford (1868–1930)
- Louise Crisp (born 1957)
- Julian Croft (born 1941)
- Alison Croggon (born 1962)
- M. T. C. Cronin (born 1963)
- Zora Cross (1890–1964)
- Margaret Curran (1887–1962)
- James Cuthbertson (1851–1910)
- Lidija Cvetkovic (born 1967)

== D ==
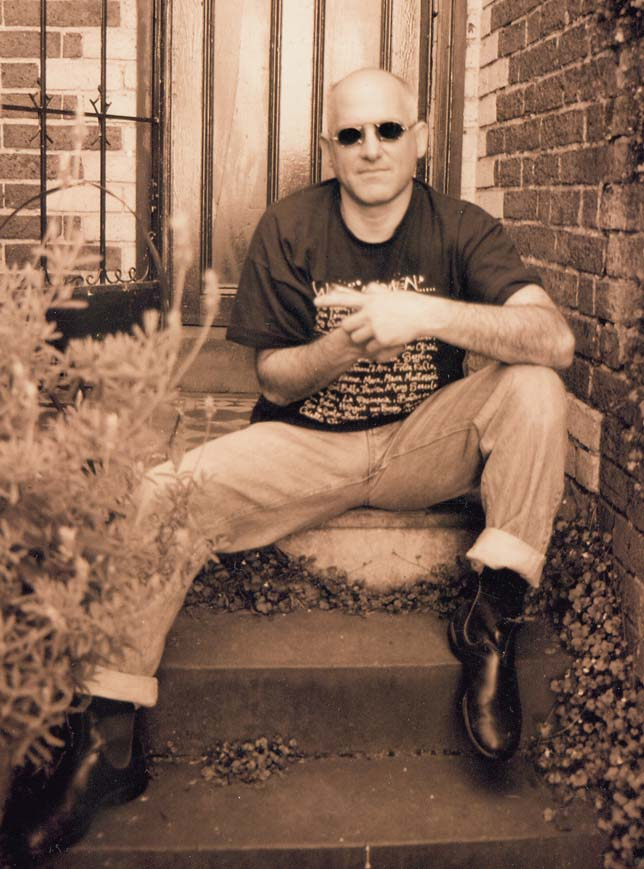
Joe Dolce

- Victor Daley (1858–1905)
- Beatrice Davis (1909–1992)
- Jack Davis (1917–2000)
- Norma Davis (1905–1945)
- Bruce Dawe (1930–2020)
- Sarah Day (born 1958)
- Dulcie Deamer (1890–1972)
- Joel Deane (born 1969)
- C. J. Dennis (1876–1938)
- Enid Derham (1882–1941)
- James Devaney (1890–1976)
- B. R. Dionysius (born 1969)
- Rosemary Dobson (1920–2012)
- Joe Dolce (born 1947)
- Lucy Dougan (born 1966)
- Michael Dransfield (1948–1973)
- Michael Dugan (1947–2006)
- Laurie Duggan (born 1949)
- Jas H Duke (1939–1992)
- Tug Dumbly (living)
- Max Dunn (1895–1963)
- Geoffrey Dutton (1922–1998)
- Edward Dyson (1865–1931)

== E ==
- Alice Eather (1988/89–2017)
- Stephen Edgar (born 1951)
- Anne Elder (1918–1976)
- Brook Emery (born 1949)
- George Essex Evans (1863–1909)
- John K. Ewers (1904–1978)

== F ==
- Diane Fahey (born 1945)
- John Farrell (1851–1904)
- Michael Farrell (born 1965)
- R. D. Fitzgerald (1902–1987)
- Roderick Flanagan (1828–1862)
- Lionel Fogarty (1958–2026)
- Mary Hannay Foott (1846–1918)
- John Forbes (1950–1998)
- Mabel Forrest (1872–1935)
- William Forster (1818–1882)
- John Foulcher (born 1952)
- Len Fox (1905–2004)
- Benjamin Frater (1979–2007)
- Brentley Frazer (born 1972)
- Mary Eliza Fullerton (1868–1946)

== G ==
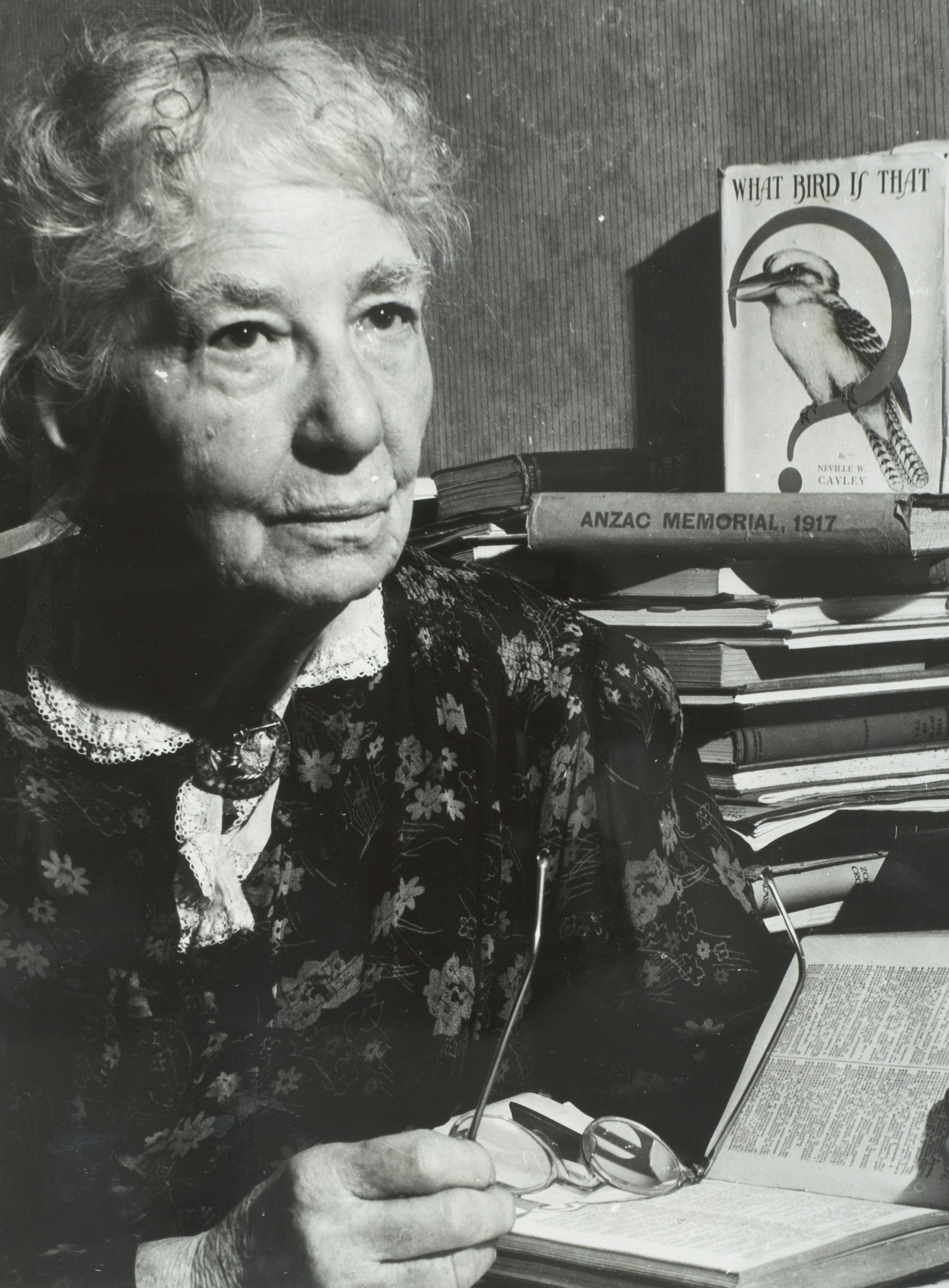
Mary Gilmore

- William Gay (1865–1897)
- Leon Gellert (1892–1977)
- G. H. Gibson ('Ironbark') (1846–1921)
- Kevin Gilbert (1933–1993)
- Mary Gilmore (1865–1962)
- Peter Goldsworthy (born 1951)
- W. T. Goodge (1862–1909)
- Adam Lindsay Gordon (1833–1870)
- Jim Grahame (1874–1949)
- Alan Gould (born 1949)
- Paul Grano (1894–1949)
- Richard Harry Graves (1898–1971)
- Robert Gray (1945–2025)
- Charmaine Papertalk Green (1962–2025)
- H. M. Green (1881–1962)
- Gavin Greenlees (1930–1983)
- Jeff Guess (born 1948)

== H ==
- Rodney Hall (born 1935)
- Philip Hammial (born 1937)
- Susan Hampton (born 1949)
- Lesbia Harford (1891–1927)
- Charles Harpur (1813–1868)
- Edward Harrington (1895–1966)
- Max Harris (1921–1995)
- Robert Harris (1951–1993)
- Jennifer Harrison (born 1955)
- Martin Harrison (1949–2014)
- Les Harrop (born 1948)
- J. S. Harry (1939–2015)
- Kevin Hart (born 1954)
- William Hart-Smith (1911–1990)
- Gwen Harwood (1920–1995)
- Nicholas Hasluck (born 1942)
- Libby Hathorn (born 1943)
- James Hebblethwaite (1857–1921)
- Anita Heiss (born 1968)
- Jill Hellyer (1925–2012), founding member of the Australian Society of Authors
- Kris Hemensley (born 1946)
- Thomas William Heney (1862–1928)
- Steven Herrick (born 1958)
- Paul Hetherington (born 1958)
- Dorothy Hewett (1923–2002)
- Charles Higham (1931–2012)
- Fiona Hile (living)
- Barry Hill (born 1943)
- Richard Hillman (born 1964)
- Philip Hodgins (1969–1995)
- Sarah Holland-Batt (born 1982)
- Harry Hooton (1908–1961)
- A. D. Hope (1907–2000)
- R. G. Howarth (1906–1974)
- George Howe (1769–1821)
- Ada Verdun Howell (1902–1981)
- Frieda Hughes (born 1960)
- Coral Hull (born 1965)
- Barry Humphries (1934–2023)
- Douglas Smith Huyghue (1816–1891)

== I–J ==
- Rex Ingamells (1913–1955)
- Eric Irvin (1908–1992)
- Clive James (1939–2019)
- Alan Jefferies (born 1957)
- Graham Jenkin (born 1938)
- John Jenkins (born 1949)
- Kate Jennings (1948–2021)
- Sydney Jephcott (1864–1951)
- Judy Johnson (born 1961)
- Martin Johnston (1947–1990)
- Evan Jones (1931–2022)
- Jill Jones (born 1951)
- John Joseph Jones (1930–2000)
- Danilo Jovanovitch (1919–2015)
- Rae Desmond Jones (1941–2017)

== K ==
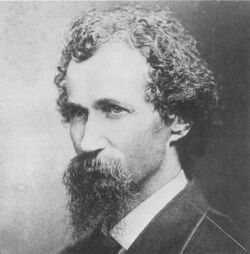
Henry Kendall

- Jayne Fenton Keane (living)
- Nancy Keesing (1923–1993)
- Antigone Kefala (1935–2022)
- Christopher Kelen (born 1958)
- S. K. Kelen (born 1956)
- Anne Kellas (born 1951)
- Nora Kelly (born early 20th c.)
- Henry Kendall (1839–1882)
- Francis Kenna (1865–1932)
- Cate Kennedy (born 1963)
- Jean Kent (born 1951)
- John Kinsella (born 1963)
- Peter Kocan (born 1947)
- Rudi Krausmann (1933–2019)

== L ==
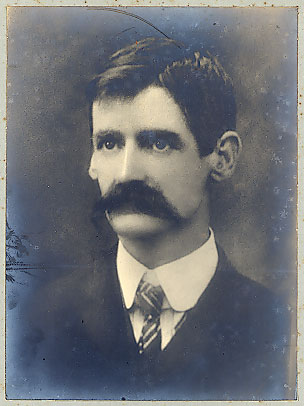
Henry Lawson

- Mike Ladd (born 1959)
- David Lake (1929–2016)
- Eve Langley (1908–1974)
- Anthony Lawrence (born 1957)
- Henry Lawson (1867–1922)
- Louisa Lawson (1848–1920)
- Bronwyn Lea (born 1969)
- Lesley Lebkowicz (born 1946)
- Andrew Leggett (born 1962)
- Geoffrey Lehmann (born 1940)
- John Leonard (born 1965)
- Emma Lew (1962)
- Bella Li (born 1983)
- Kate Lilley (born 1960)
- Jack Lindsay (1900–1990)
- Jessie Litchfield (1883–1956)
- Tatjana Lukić (1959–2008)
- Arthur Alfred Lynch (1861–1934)

== M ==
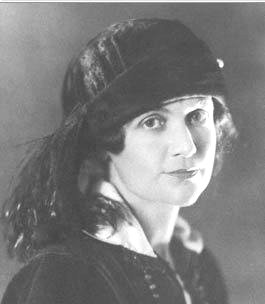
Dorothea Mackellar

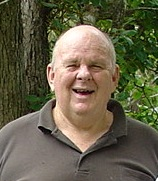
Les Murray

- Frederick T. Macartney (1887–1980)
- James McAuley (1917–1976)
- Ian McBryde (born 1953)
- George Gordon McCrae (1833–1927)
- David McCooey (born 1967)
- Hugh McCrae (1876–1958)
- Ronald McCuaig (1908–1993)
- Nan McDonald (1921–1974)
- Roger McDonald (born 1941)
- Ella McFadyen (1887–1976)
- Greg McLaren (born 1967)
- Dorothea Mackellar (1885–1968)
- Louise Mack (1870–1935)
- Kenneth Mackenzie (1913–1955)
- Rhyll McMaster (born 1947)
- Mollie McNutt (1885–1919)
- Jennifer Maiden (born 1949)
- Ern Malley (hoax poet created 1943)
- David Malouf (1934–2026)
- John Manifold (1915–1985)
- Leonard Mann (1895–1981)
- Emily Manning (1845–1890)
- Frederic Manning (1882–1935)
- Chris Mansell (born 1953)

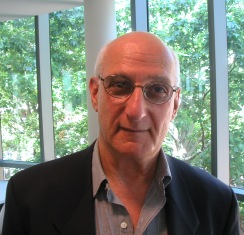
David Malouf

- Billy Marshall Stoneking (1947–2016)
- David Martin (1915–1997)
- Philip Martin (1931–2005)
- John Mateer (born 1971)
- Ray Mathew (1929–2002)
- Furnley Maurice (1881–1942)
- Louisa Anne Meredith (1812–1895)
- James Lionel Michael (1824–1868)
- John Millett (poet) (1921–2019)
- Sudesh Mishra (born 1962 in Fiji)
- Paul Mitchell (born 1968)
- T. Inglis Moore (1901–1978)
- Mal Morgan (1935–1999)
- Frank Morton (1869–1923)
- Ian Mudie (1911–1976)
- Mudrooroo (1938–2019)
- Edwin Greenslade Murphy (1866–1939)
- Les Murray (1938–2019)
- David Musgrave (born 1965)

== N ==
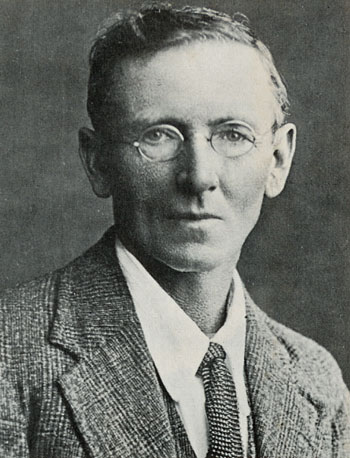
John Shaw Neilson

- Sydney Elliott Napier (1870–1940)
- John Shaw Neilson (1872–1942)
- Philip Neilsen (born 1949)
- Hume Nisbet (1849–1923)
- Oodgeroo Noonuccal (Kath Walker) (1920–1993)

== O ==
- John O'Brien (1879–1952)
- Mark O'Connor (born 1945)
- Bernard O'Dowd (1866–1953)
- Ernest O'Ferrall (1881–1925) "Kodak"
- Will H. Ogilvie (1869–1963)
- John Bernard O'Hara (1862–1927)
- Pixie O'Harris (1903–1991)
- Thuy On (living)
- Dowell O'Reilly (1865–1923)
- Ouyang Yu (born 1955)
- Jan Owen (born 1940)

== P ==
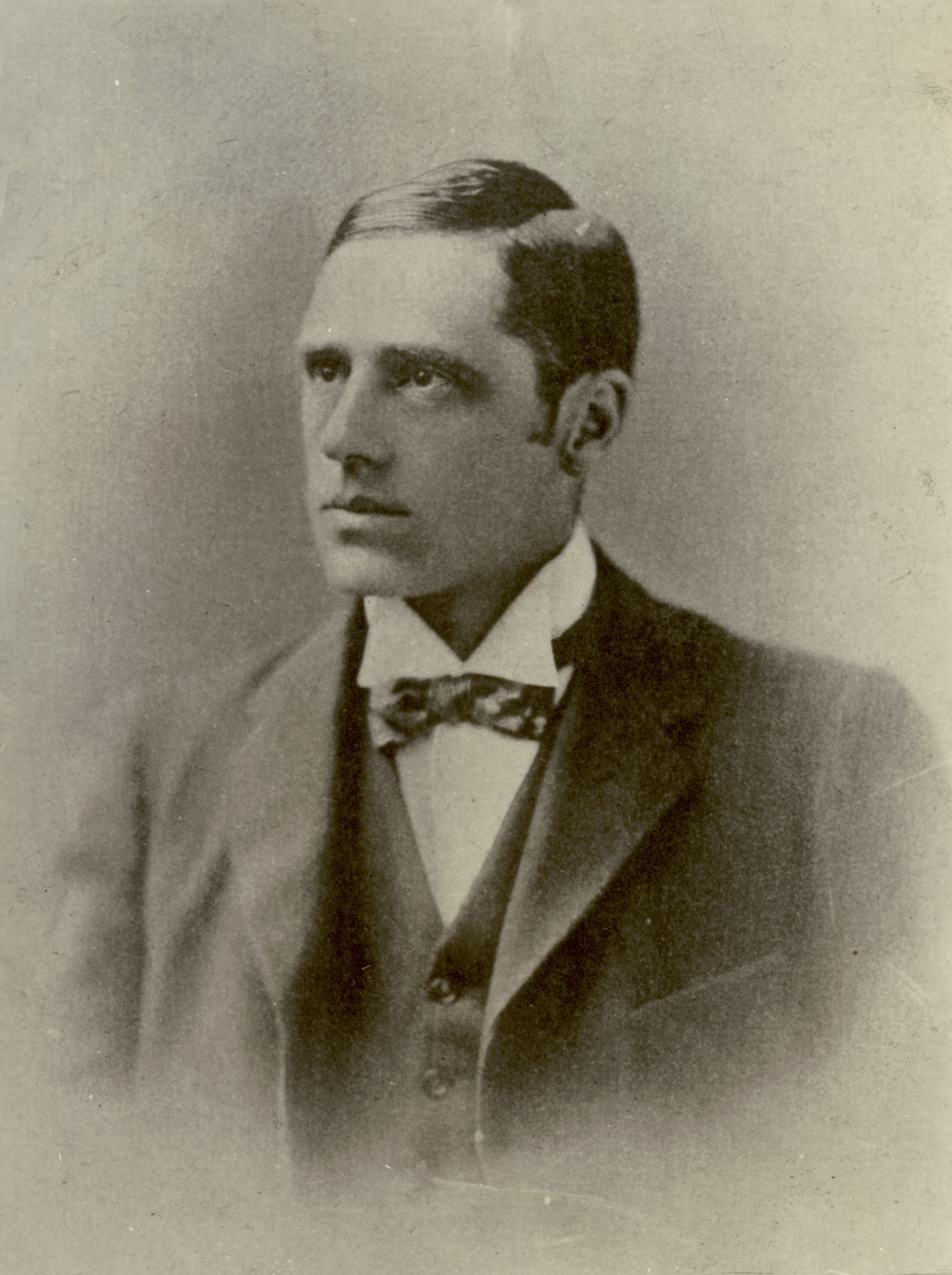
Banjo Paterson

- Geoff Page (born 1940)
- Nettie Palmer (1885–1964)
- Vance Palmer (1885–1959)
- Aristides Paradissis (1923–2006)
- Banjo Paterson (1864–1941)
- Olive Pell (1903–2002)
- Grace Perry (1927–1987)
- Pi O (П O) (born 1951)
- Marie E. J. Pitt (1869–1948)
- Marjorie Pizer (1920–2016)
- Marcella Polain (born 1958)
- Dorothy Porter (1954–2008)
- Hal Porter (1911–1984)
- Peter Porter (1929–2010)
- Craig Powell (1940–2022)
- Marguerite Helen Power (1870–1957)
- Ron Pretty (1940–2023)

== Q–R ==
- Roderic Quinn (1867–1949)
- Jennifer Rankin (1941–1979)
- Kerry Reed-Gilbert (1956–2019)
- Robert Richardson (1855–1901)
- Elizabeth Riddell (1910–1998)
- Roland Robinson (1912–1992)
- Judith Rodriguez (1936–2018)
- Peter Rose (born 1955)
- David Rowbotham (1924–2010)
- Noel Rowe (1951–2007)
- Graham Rowlands (born 1947)
- Brendan Ryan (born 1963)
- Gig Ryan (born 1956)
- Tracy Ryan (born 1964)

== S ==
- Philip Salom (born 1950)
- Clive Sansom (1910–1981)
- Andrew Sant (born 1950)
- Jen Saunders (born 1962)
- Dipti Saravanamuttu (born 1960)
- Jaya Savige (born 1978)
- Bel Schenk (born 1975)
- John A. Scott (born 1948)
- Margaret Scott (1934–2005)
- Thomas Shapcott (born 1935)
- Sanu Sharma (living)
- Michael Sharkey (born 1946)
- Leni Shilton (living)
- Luke Icarus Simon (born 1963)
- R. A. Simpson (1929–2002)
- Tim Sinclair (born 1972)
- Peter Skrzynecki (born 1945)
- Kenneth Slessor (1901–1971)
- Vivian Smith (born 1933)
- Edward Sorenson (1869–1939)
- Thomas Edward Spencer (1845–1910)
- Nicolette Stasko (born 1950)
- Peter Steele (1939–2012)
- James Brunton Stephens (1835–1902)
- Amanda Stewart (born 1959)
- Douglas Stewart (1913–1985)
- Harold Stewart (1916–1995)
- Randolph Stow (1935–2010)
- Jennifer Strauss (born 1933)
- Roberta "Bobbi" Sykes (1944–2010)

== T ==
- Maria Takolander (born 1973)
- Andrew Taylor (born 1940)
- Colin Thiele (1920–2006)
- Tim Thorne (1944–2021)
- Michael Thwaites (1915–2005)
- Richard Tipping (born 1949)
- Charles Tompson (1806–1883)
- John Tranter (1943–2023)
- Mark Tredinnick (born 1962)
- Dimitris Tsaloumas (1921–2016)
- Tug Dumbly (born 1965)

== V ==
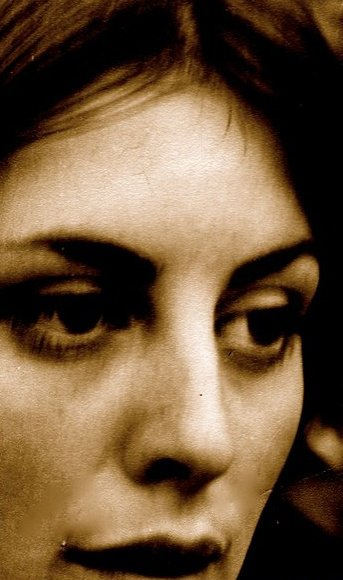
Lin Van Hek

- Valentine Vallis (1916–2009)
- Ellen van Neerven (born 1990)
- Vicki Viidikas (1948–1998)
- Lin Van Hek (born 1944)
- Brian Vrepont (1882–1955)

== W ==
- Chris Wallace-Crabbe (1934–2025)
- Rob Walker (born 1953)
- Ania Walwicz (1951–2020)
- Maureen Watson (1931–2009)
- Samuel Wagan Watson (born 1972)
- Alan Wearne (born 1948)
- Francis Webb (1925–1973)
- William Wentworth (1790–1872)
- Herb Wharton (1936–2026)
- Les Wicks (born 1955)
- Dora Wilcox (1873–1953)
- Ronald W. T. Wilkins (born 1935)
- Donna Williams (1963–2017)
- Frank S. Williamson (1865–1936)
- Edwin Wilson (1942–2022)
- Liz Winfield (born 1964)
- David McKee Wright (1869–1928)
- Judith Wright (1915–2000)

== Y–Z ==
- Morgan Yasbincek (born 1964)
- Ellen Young (1810–1872)
- Komninos Zervos (born 1950)
- Fay Zwicky (1933–2017)

== See also ==
- Poetry
- List of poets
- List of English-language poets
- Australian literature
- Poets Union
