= 1876 in poetry =

Nationality words link to articles with information on the nation's poetry or literature (for instance, Irish or France).

== Events ==
- February 24 – Première of first stage production of the poetic drama Peer Gynt by Henrik Ibsen (published 1867) with incidental music by Edvard Grieg, in Christiania, Norway.
- May – April Uprising of 1876: Bulgarian poet Hristo Botev leads a party of émigré revolutionaries against Ottoman forces in Bulgaria but is shot and killed.

== Works published in English ==
=== United Kingdom ===
- Robert Bridges, The Growth of Love (revised and expanded in 1889)
- Robert Browning, Pacchiarotto and How He Worked in Distemper; with Other Poems
- Lewis Carroll, The Hunting of the Snark
- Edward Dowden, Poems
- Toru Dutt, A Sheaf Gleaned in French Fields: Verse Translations and Poems, Bhowanipur, Calcutta: B. M. Bose (expanded edition, Bhowanipur: Saptahik Sambad Press 1878; London: Kegan Paul 1880); Indian poet, writing in English, published in the United Kingdom
- Dora Greenwell, Camera Obscura
- Gerard Manley Hopkins, The Wreck of the Deutschland, submitted for publication but not in fact published until 1918
- Edward Lear, Laughable Lyrics: Fourth Book of Nonsense Poems, Songs, Botany, Music, &c., including "The Dong with a Luminous Nose", "The Courtship of the Yonghy-Bonghy-Bò", "The Pobble Who Has No Toes", "The Quangle Wangle's Hat" and "The Akond of Swat", published December 1876, dated 1877
- William Morris, The Story of Sigurd the Volsung and the Fall of the Niblungs
- Emily Pfeiffer, Poems
- Percy Bysshe Shelley, The Works of Percy Bysshe Shelley, edited by Harry Buxton Forman, eight volumes published from this year through 1880

=== United States ===
- Ralph Waldo Emerson, Selected Poems
- Herman Melville, Clarel: A Poem and Pilgrimage in the Holy Land
- Julia A. Moore, The Sweet Singer of Michigan Salutes the Public (see subsection below; republished as The Sentimental Song Book)
- Bayard Taylor, The Echo Club and Other Literary Diversions
- Walt Whitman, Leaves of Grass, sixth edition
- John Greenleaf Whittier, Mabel Martin

==== The Sweet Singer of Michigan Salutes the Public ====
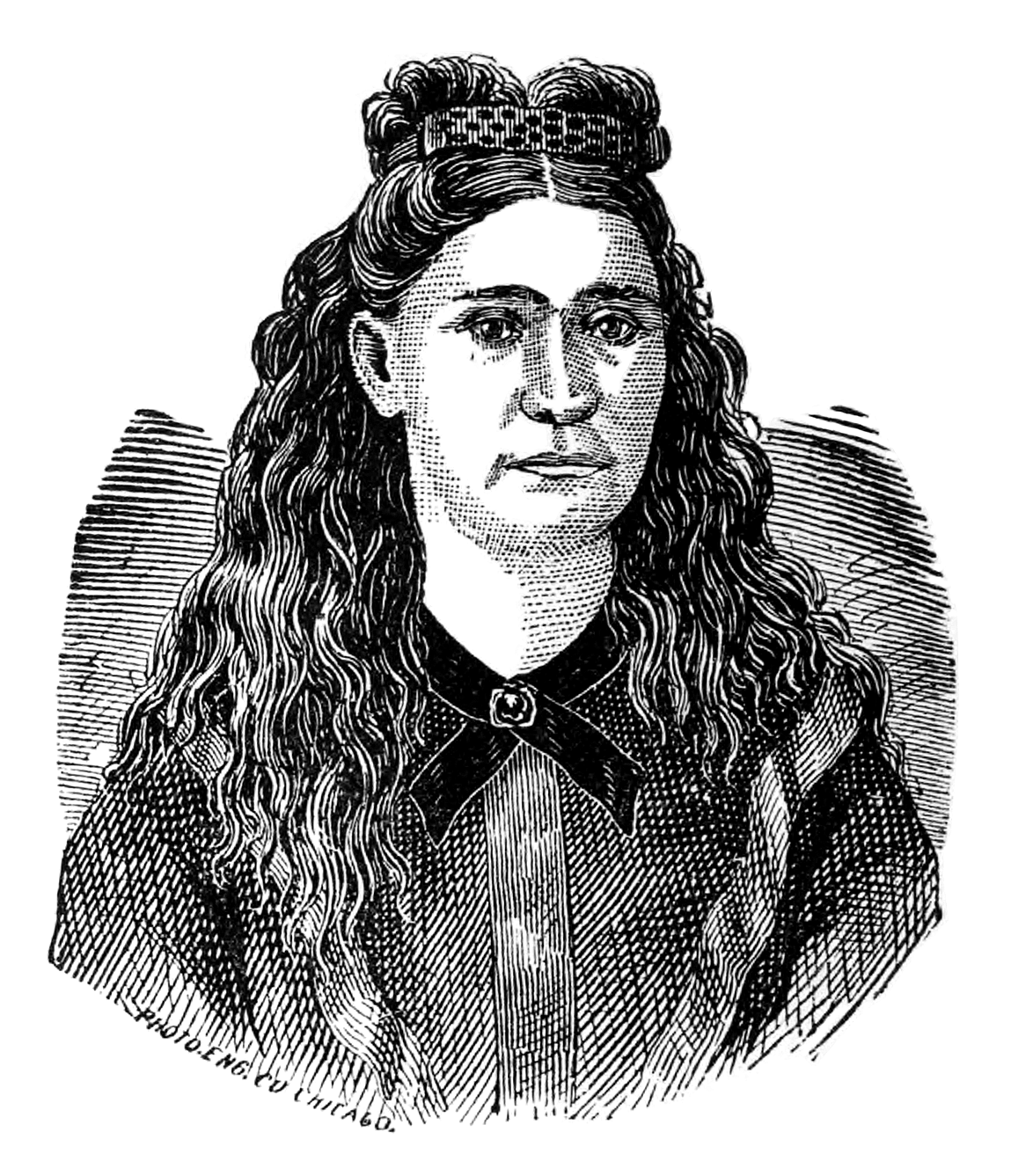
Mrs. Moore

This year Poetaster Julia A. Moore's first book of verse, The Sentimental Song Book, was published in Grand Rapids, and quickly went into a second printing. A copy fell into the hands of one James F. Ryder, a Cleveland, Ohio, publisher who recognized its awful majesty and soon republished it under the title The Sweet Singer of Michigan Salutes the Public. Ryder sent out numerous review copies to newspapers across the country, with a cover letter filled with low key mock praise.

And so Moore received national attention. Following Ryder's lead, contemporary reviews were amusedly negative. For instance, The Rochester Democrat wrote of Sweet Singer, that "Shakespeare, could he read it, would be glad that he was dead .... If Julia A. Moore would kindly deign to shed some of her poetry on our humble grave, we should be but too glad to go out and shoot ourselves tomorrow."

=== Other in English ===
- Toru Dutt, A Sheaf Gleaned in French Fields: Verse Translations and Poems, Bhowanipur, Calcutta: B. M. Bose (expanded edition, Bhowanipur: Saptahik Sambad Press 1878; London: Kegan Paul 1880); Indian poet, writing in English, published in the United Kingdom
- Behramji Merwanji Malabari, editor, The Indian Muse in English Garb, Bombay: Merwanji Nowroji, Daboo, 99 pages; Indian poetry in English

== Works published in other languages ==
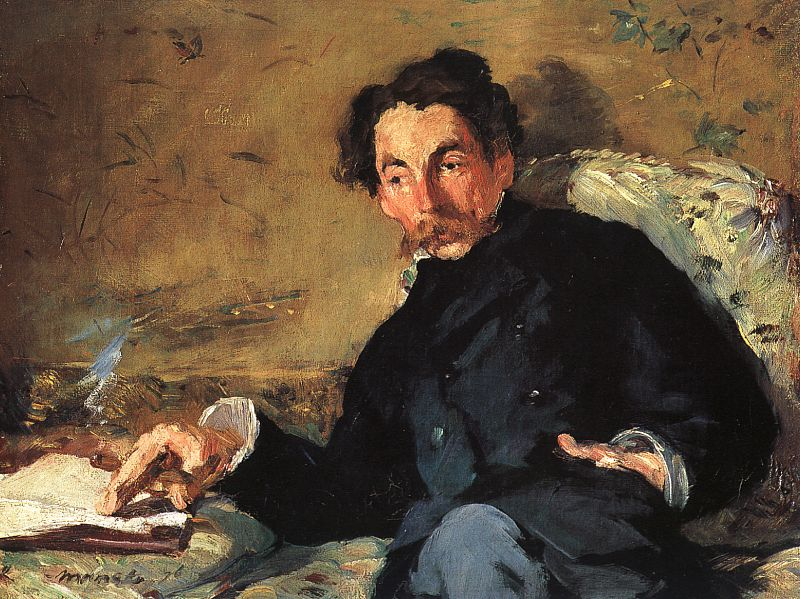
Portrait of Stéphane Mallarmé, by Édouard Manet, 1876

=== France ===
- François Coppée, Olivier
- Stéphane Mallarmé, L'après-midi d'un faune ("Afternoon of a Faun", or "A Faun in the Afternoon"), published in April, with illustrations by Manet
- Catulle Mendès, Poesies, jere serie

=== Spanish ===
- Rosario de Acuña, Ecos del alma ("Echoes from the Soul")

== Births ==
Death years link to the corresponding "[year] in poetry" article:

- January 19 – Dragotin Kette (died 1899), Slovene
- January 25 – William Ellery Leonard (died 1944), American
- January 30 – Eva Dobell (died 1963) English poet, nurse and editor, best known for her verses related to World War I soldiers
- February 4 – Sarah Norcliffe Cleghorn (died 1959), American poet and socialist
- February 6 – Alice Guerin Crist (died 1941), Irish-born Australian
- March 4 – Léon-Paul Fargue (died 1947), French editor, poet and essayist
- March 15 – Kambara Ariake 蒲原有明 pen-name of Kambara Hayao (died 1952), Japanese Taishō and Shōwa period poet and novelist
- March 23
  - Ziya Gökalp (died 1924), Turkish sociologist, poet and activist
  - Thakin Kodaw Hmaing (died 1964), Burmese poet, writer and political leader
- June 20 – Edmond Laforest (suicide 1915), Haitian French language poet
- July 12 – Max Jacob (died 1944), French painter, poet and critic
- July 25 – Mihai Codreanu (died 1957), Romanian
- September 7 – C. J. Dennis (died 1938), Australian poet, author of The Songs of a Sentimental Bloke
- October 4 – Hugh McCrae (died 1958), Australian
- October 25 – Geoffrey Winthrop Young (died 1958), English mountaineer, poet and educator
- December 9 – Mizuho Ōta 太田水穂 pen-name of "Teiichi Ōta" 太田 貞, occasionally also using the pen name, "Mizuhonoya" (died 1955), Japanese Shōwa period poet and literary scholar
- Also:
  - William Lawson (died 1957), Australian
  - Joseph Lee (died 1949), Scottish war poet, artist and journalist

== Deaths ==
Birth years link to the corresponding "[year] in poetry" article:

- February 1 – Meenakshi Sundaram Pillai (born 1815), Indian Tamil scholar and poet
- June 1 (May 20 O.S.) – Hristo Botev (born 1848), Bulgarian revolutionary and poet, killed
- June 20 – John Neal (born 1793), eccentric and influential American writer, critic, lecturer and activist
- July 14 – Charles Heavysege (born 1816), Canadian
- December 23 – Charles Neaves (born 1800), Scottish judge and poet
- December 27 – Frederik Paludan-Muller (born 1809), Danish
- December 30 – Christian Winther (born 1796), Danish
- Also – Gu Taiqing (born 1799), Chinese poet during the Qing dynasty

== See also ==
- 19th century in poetry
- 19th century in literature
- List of years in poetry
- List of years in literature
- Victorian literature
- French literature of the 19th century
- Poetry
