= 1881 in poetry =

This article covers 1881 in poetry. Nationality words link to articles with information on the nation's poetry or literature (for instance, Irish or France).

== Events ==
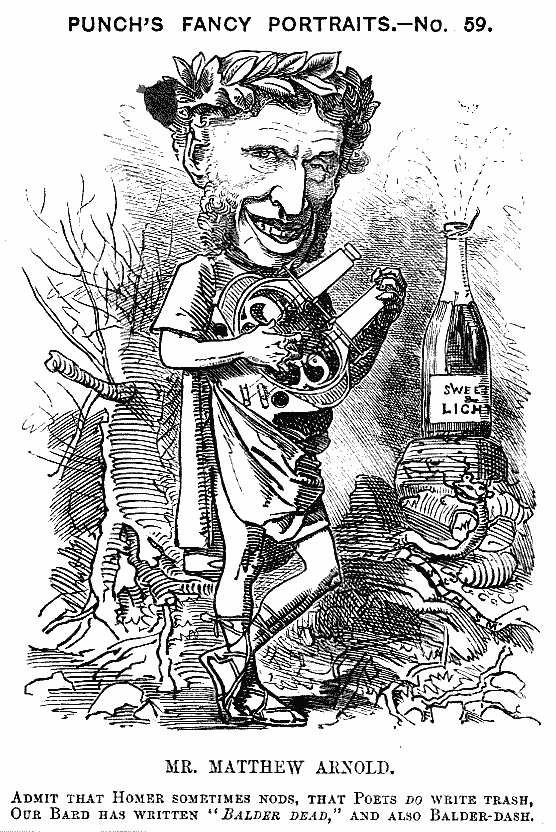
Caricature from Punch, 1881: "Admit that Homer sometimes nods, That poets do write trash, Our Bard has written "Balder Dead," And also Balder-dash"

- Frederick James Furnivall founds the Browning Society

== Works published in English ==
=== Canada ===
- Rosanna Eleanor Leprohon, Poetical Works, posthumously published, Canada
- Pamela Vining Yule. Poems of the Heart and Home.

=== United Kingdom ===
- Wilfrid Scawen Blunt, The Love Sonnets of Proteus (see also Sonnets and Songs 1875, Love Lyrics 1892)
- Katherine Harris Bradley and Edith Emma Cooper, writing as "Arran and Islan Leigh", Bellerophon, and Other Poems
- Amy Levy, Xantippe, and Other Verse
- George Moore, Pagan Poems
- Constance Naden, Songs and Sonnets of Springtime
- Christina Rossetti, A Pageant, and other Poems
- Dante Gabriel Rossetti, Ballads and Sonnets, with "The House of Life" complete, and Poems
- Oscar Wilde, Poems, three editions published this year, first edition in June

=== United States ===
- Thomas Bailey Aldrich, Friar Jerome's Beautiful Book
- Ina Coolbrith, A Perfect Day
- James T. Fields, Ballads and Other Verses, Boston: Houghton Mifflin & Company, Riverside Press imprint, United States
- Joel Chandler Harris, Uncle Remus: His Songs and His Sayings, including poetry
- Fitz-James O'Brien, Poems and Stories
- Epes Sargent, Harper's Cyclopaedia of British and American Poets (scholarship), posthumously published, United States
- John Greenleaf Whittier, The King's Missive

== Works published in other languages ==
- Alexander Baumgartner, Festspiel zur Calderonfeier, Switzerland
- François Coppée, Conies en tiers, France
- Victor Hugo, Les Quatres vents de l'esprit, France
- Jorge Isaacs, Saulo, 1st canto (no more published), Colombia
- Helena Nyblom, Digte ("Poems"), Denmark

== Births ==
Death years link to the corresponding "[year] in poetry" article:

- January 9 – Lascelles Abercrombie (died 1938), English poet and literary critic called the Georgian Laureate and one of the "Dymock poets"
- February 13 – Eleanor Farjeon (died 1965), English author and poet
- February 15 – Piaras Béaslaí (died 1965), Irish writer and poet
- February 17 – Puran Singh (died 1931), Indian, writing Indian poetry in English
- March 6 – John Cournos, born Ivan Grigorievich Korshun (died 1966), Russian-American Imagist poet, but better known for his novels, short stories, essays, criticism and translations of Russian literature (pen name: John Courtney)
- April 4 – Gertrud von Puttkamer, born Gertrud Günther (died 1944), German homoerotic poet (pen name: Marie-Madeleine)
- April 6 – Furnley Maurice (died 1942), Australian
- April 16 – Alice Corbin Henderson (died 1949), American poet
- May 18 – Alan Edward Mulgan (died 1962), New Zealand
- June 10 – Jaime Sabartés (died 1968), Catalan Spanish poet and longtime secretary to Pablo Picasso
- August 1 – Aizu Yaichi 会津 八一 (died 1956), Japanese poet, calligrapher and historian (surname: Aizu)
- August 10 – Witter Bynner (died 1968), American poet, writer and scholar
- August 20 – Edgar Albert Guest (died 1959), prolific American poet
- September 16 – Clive Bell (died 1964), English critic associated with the Bloomsbury group
- October 30 – Elizabeth Madox Roberts (died 1941), American novelist and poet
- November 15:
  - Franklin Pierce Adams (died 1960), American columnist (pen name: F.P.A.), writer and wit, part of the Algonquin Round Table of the 1920s and 1930s whose newspaper column introduced the public to many poets and writers
  - Masamune Atsuo 正宗敦夫 (died 1958), Japanese poet and academic (surname: Masamune)
- November 16 – Ernest O'Ferrall (died 1925), Australian poet and short-story writer (pen name: Kodak)
- December 8 – Padraic Colum (died 1972), Irish poet, novelist, dramatist, biographer, collector of folklore and a leading figure of the Celtic Revival
- December 24 – Lady Margaret Sackville (died 1963), English poet and children's author
- Also:
  - Swami Ananda Acharya (died 1945), Indian poet who wrote Indian poetry in English
  - Deepakba Desai (died 1955), Indian, Gujarati-language woman poet who wrote khandakavyas
  - Ardoshir Faramji Kharbardar (died 1953), Indian, Gujarati-language, Parsi poet
  - Sotiris Skipis (died 1951), Greek

== Deaths ==
Birth years link to the corresponding "[year] in poetry" article:

- January 30 – Arthur O'Shaughnessy (born 1844), 36, British poet
- August 2 – Marcus Clarke (born 1846), 35, Australian novelist and poet
- September 7 – Sidney Lanier (born 1842), 39, American musician and poet
- October 12 – Josiah Gilbert Holland (born 1819), 62, American novelist and poet
- November 1 – Jacques Perk (born 1859), 22, Dutch poet
- November 4 – Estella Hijmans-Hertzveld (born 1837), 44, Dutch poet
- Also – Mangkunegara IV (born 1809), Javanese ruler of Mangkunegaran and poet

== See also ==
- 19th century in poetry
- 19th century in literature
- List of years in poetry
- List of years in literature
- Victorian literature
- French literature of the 19th century
- Poetry
