= 1949 in poetry =

Links to nations or nationalities point to articles with information on that nation's poetry or literature. For example, United Kingdom links to English poetry and Indian links to Indian poetry.

== Events ==
- January 19 - Starting this year, and continuing to at least 2009, an anonymous black-clad person, who enters popular lore as the Poe Toaster, appears in Baltimore at the Westminster Hall and Burying Ground tomb of American poet Edgar Allan Poe early on the morning of Poe's birthday. The man toasts Poe with Cognac and leaves three red roses at the grave (along with the remainder of the Cognac).
- February 19 - American poet Ezra Pound, at this time incarcerated in a psychiatric institution, is awarded the first Bollingen Prize in poetry by the Bollingen Foundation and Yale University provoking a storm of criticism because of his pro-Fascist activities before and during World War II.
- March - Pablo Neruda flees Chile over the Lilpela Pass through the Andes to Argentina on horseback carrying a manuscript of his Canto General.
- April 14 - Roy Campbell punches Stephen Spender on the nose at a poetry reading in London.
- October - Publication begins in Italy of L'inferno di Topolino, a graphic parody of Dante's Inferno featuring Mickey Mouse with text and verse by Guido Martina.
- Indonesian poet Chairil Anwar writes his last poem, "Cemara Menderai Sampai Jauh" ("Fir Trees Are Sown Off Into the Distance"), prior to his death aged 26 on April 28.
- Greek Communist poet Yannis Ritsos, incarcerated during the Communist–centrist/rightist struggle in the Greek Civil War, writes poems which will ultimately see publication twenty-six years later, in the 1975 book, Petrinos khronos.
- George Hill Dillon, editor of the journal Poetry since 1937, relinquishes his post.
- First issue of Caribbean Quarterly, the flagship journal on culture edited at the University of the West Indies, spotlights Caribbean poetry.

== Works published in English ==
Listed by nation where the work was first published and again by the poet's native land, if different; substantially revised works listed separately:

=== Canada ===
- Raymond Knister, Collected Poems ed. Dorothy Livesay.
- James Reaney, The Red Heart. Governor General's Award 1949.

=== India, in English ===
- Sri Aurobindo, Chitrangada ( Poetry in English ), Bombay: Sri Aurobindo Circle,

=== New Zealand ===
- Allen Curnow:
  - The Axe, a verse play with a Pacific setting (Caxton)
  - At Dead Low Water and Sonnets (Caxton)
- Basil Dowling, Canterbury

=== United Kingdom ===
- Dannie Abse, After Every Green Thing
- Edward Andrade, Poems and Songs
- Edmund Blunden, After the Bombing, and Other Short Poems
- Roy Campbell, Collected Poems, Volume 1 (Volume 2 1957, Volume 3 (consisting of translations) 1960)
- C. Day-Lewis, Collected Poems, published in March, although the book states "1948" (see also Collected Poems 1954)
- William Empson, Collected Poems of William Empson
- Roy Fuller, Epitaphs and Occasions
- Robert Garioch Sutherland, writing under the name "Robert Garioch", Chuckles on the Cairn
- W. S. Graham, The White Threshold
- Geoffrey Grigson, editor, Poetry of the Present, anthology
- Christopher Hassall, The Slow Night, and Other Poems 1940–8
- James Kirkup, editor, Leeds University Poetry, including work by Kirkup, Wilfred Rowland Childe, Derrick Metcalfe, and Kenneth Muir (Hull: Lotus Press)
- Louis MacNeice, Collected Poems 1925–48
- Edwin Muir, The Labyrinth
- Kathleen Raine, The Pythoness, and Other Poems
- James Reeves, The Imprisoned Sea
- Edith Sitwell, The Canticle of the Rose: Poems 1917–1949
- Stephen Spender, The Edge of Being
- W. B. Yeats (d. 1939), Poems, "The Definitive Edition", Irish poet published in the United Kingdom

=== United States ===
- Conrad Aiken:
  - The Divine Pilgrim
  - Skylight One
- Joseph Payne Brennan, Heart of Earth (Decker Press)
- Gwendolyn Brooks, Annie Allen
- John Ciardi, Live Another Day
- Hilda Doolittle, writing under the pen name "H.D.", By Avon River
- Kenneth Fearing, Stranger at Coney Island
- Robert Frost, Complete Poems
- Langston Hughes, One-Way Ticket
- Kenneth Patchen:
  - Red Wine & Yellow Hair
  - To Say If You Love Someone
- Ezra Pound, Selected Poems
- Kenneth Rexroth:
  - The Signature of All Things
  - The Art of Worldly Wisdom", Prairie City, Illinois: Decker Press
- Louis Simpson, The Arrivistes
- Donald A. Stauffer, The Golden Nightingale: Essays on Some Principles of Poetry in the Lyrics of William Butler Yeats, New York: Macmillan, United States criticism
- Peter Viereck, The Poet in the Machine Age
- William Carlos Williams:
  - Paterson, Book III
  - Selected Poems

=== Other in English ===
- Judith Wright, Woman to Man, Australian
- W. B. Yeats (d. 1939), Poems, "The Definitive Edition", Irish poet published in the United Kingdom

== Works published in other languages ==
=== France ===
- Aimé Césaire, Corps perdu
- Paul Éluard, pen name of Paul-Eugène Grindel, ''Une leçon de morale
- Eugene Guilleveic, Gagner
- Pierre Jean Jouve, Diadème
- Henri Michaux, Poesie pour pouvoir, Paris: Drouin
- Pierre Reverdy, Main d'oeuvre: 1913–1949
- Claude Roy, Le Poète mineur
- Jules Supervielle, Oublieuse Mémoire
- Tristan Tzara, pen name of Sami Rosenstock, Phases

=== India ===
In each section, listed in alphabetical order by first name:

==== Marathi ====
- C. V. Karandikar, also known as Vinda Karandikar, Svedaganga, India, Marathi-language
- Manmohan, Yugayugance Sahapravasi, Indian, Marathi-language (later translated into Hindi under the title Marsal ki Salami)
- K. B. Nikumb, Ujjvala, Indian, Marathi-language
- Sarachchandra Muktibodh, Navi Malavat Indian, Marathi-language
- Shrikrishna Powale, Jala Mati, Indian, Marathi-language

==== Other languages of the Indian subcontinent ====
- Chittadhar Hridaya, Sugata Saurabha, a Buddhist epic, written in Nepal Bhasa, mostly in prison 1941-46, published in India
- Masood Husain, Urdu zaban aur adab, a history, written in Urdu of that language and its literature
- Nilakantha Shastri, translator, Sri Rama Carita, translation into Sanskrit of the Tamil-language Kamba Ramayana
- Pritam Singh Safir, Rakt Bundam, Indian, Punjabi-language
- S. Lalita, translator, Valarmati, translation into Tamil from the Indian poetry in English of Rabindranath Tagore's The Crescent Moon
- Sitaramaiah Kuruganti, Navyandhra Sahitya Vidhulu, a four-volume history in Telugu of that language's literature
- Umar Alisha, translator, Umar Khayyam, translation into Telugu from the Persian of Omar Khayyam's Rubaiyats

=== Other languages ===
Listed by nation where the work was first published and again by the poet's native land, if different; substantially revised works listed separately:

- Alfonso Calderón, Primer Consejo a los Arcangeles del Viento ("First Advice to the Archangels of the Wind"), Spanish-language, Chile
- Haim Gouri, Pirhei Esh ("Flowers of Fire, Years of Fire"), Israeli writing in Hebrew
- Eric Knudsen, Blomsten og sværdet ("The Flower and the Sword"), Denmark
- Alexander Mezhirov, Новые встречи ("New Encounters"), including "Communists, Ahead!", Russia
- Máirtín Ó Direáin, Rogha Dánta, Irish poet writing in Irish
- Carlos de Oliveira, Descida aos Infernos
- Nizar Qabbani, Samba, Syrian poet writing in Arabic

== Awards and honors ==
- Consultant in Poetry to the Library of Congress (later the post would be called "Poet Laureate Consultant in Poetry to the Library of Congress"): Elizabeth Bishop appointed this year.
- Pulitzer Prize for Poetry: Peter Viereck, Terror and Decorum
- Bollingen Prize: Ezra Pound
- Canada: Governor General's Award, poetry or drama: The Red Heart, James Reaney

== Births ==
Death years link to the corresponding "[year] in poetry" article:

- January 2 – Jean Krier (died 2013), Luxembourger poet
- January 6 – Carolyn D. Wright (died 2016), writing as C. D. Wright, American poet
- January 25 – Tom Paulin, Northern Irish poet and critic of film, music and literature
- January 27 – Bruce Weigl, American poet and academic
- February – Agha Shahid Ali (died 2001), Indian-born English-language poet
- February 6
  - Victor Hernández Cruz, Puerto Rico-born American poet
  - Eliot Weinberger, American essayist and principal translator of Octavio Paz into English
- March 14 – Lynn Emanuel, American poet
- April 1 – Gil Scott-Heron (died 2011), African-American poet, jazz/soul musician and author
- April 13 – Marilyn Bowering, Canadian poet and novelist
- April 25 – James Fenton, English journalist, poet, critic and academic
- May 6 – Olga Broumas, Greek-born English-language poet in the United States
- May 13 – Christopher Reid, Hong Kong-born English poet, essayist, cartoonist, writer and exponent of Martian poetry
- May 15 – Alice Major, Scottish-born Canadian poet
- June 21:
  - John Agard, playwright, poet and children's writer from Guyana, who moves to England in 1977
  - Jane Urquhart, Canadian poet and author
- July 1 – Denis Johnson (died 2017), American writer
- July 5 – Pier Giorgio di Cicco (died 2019), Italian-Canadian poet
- July 24 – David St. John, American poet and academic
- July 24 – Brook Emery, Australian poet and educator.
- July 31 – Mark O'Brien (died 1999), American poet
- August 1 – Jim Carroll (died 2009), American poet, author and punk musician
- August 2 – Bei Dao (北島, literally "Northern Island"), pseudonym of Zhao Zhenkai, Chinese poet, the most notable representative of the Misty Poets, a group of Chinese poets who react against the restrictions of the Cultural Revolution
- August 6 – Mary di Michele, Italian-born Canadian poet and writer
- August 14 – Jaroslav Erik Frič (died 2019), Czech poet, musician, publisher and underground culture figure
- September 11 – David Bottoms, American poet
- September 29 – Gabriel Rosenstock, Irish poet.
- November 21 – Liam Rector (died 2007), American poet, essayist and academic
- December 9 – Eileen Myles, American poet
- Also:
  - Cathy Smith Bowers, American poet and teacher, North Carolina Poet Laureate, 2010–2012
  - Tim Liardet, English poet and teacher
  - Barbara Ras, American poet

== Deaths ==
Birth years link to the corresponding "[year] in poetry" article:

- March 2 – Sarojini Naidu (born 1879), Indian writing Indian poetry in English and political activist
- April 27 – Evan Morgan, 2nd Viscount Tredegar (born 1893), Welsh poet and occultist
- April 28 – Chairil Anwar (born 1922), Indonesian poet
- May 5 – Hideo Nagata 長田秀雄 (born 1885), Shōwa period Japanese poet, playwright and screenwriter (surname: Nagata)
- May 6 – Maurice Maeterlinck, Belgian poet, playwright and Nobel Laureate
- June 15 – Ulloor S. Parameswara Iyer, also known simply as "Ulloor" (born 1877), Indian, Malayalam-language poet, scholar and government official who published a five-volume history of Malayalam literature
- July 18 – Alice Corbin Henderson (born 1881), American poet
- July 25 – Lilian Bowes Lyon (born 1895), English poet
- September 9 – Fredegond Shove (born 1889), English poet
- December 28 – Hervey Allen (born 1889), American novelist and poet
- Joseph Lee (born 1876), Scottish war poet, artist and journalist

== See also ==
- Poetry
- List of poetry awards
- List of years in poetry
