= 1925 in poetry =

Nationality words link to articles with information on the nation's poetry or literature, including Irish or France.

== Events ==
- January – Ezra Pound returns to Rapallo, Italy from Sicily to settle permanently after a brief stay the year before.
- February 11 – Eli Siegel wins The Nation Poetry Prize for "Hot Afternoons Have Been in Montana".
- February 21 – First issue of The New Yorker magazine is published.
- November 21 – First issue of McGill Fortnightly Review, a publication of Montreal Group of modernist poets and the first organ to feature modernist poetry, fiction, and literary criticism in Canada.
- December 28 – Russian poet Sergei Yesenin (b. 1895) writes his farewell poem, "Goodbye, my friend, goodbye" (До свиданья, друг мой, до свиданья), in his own blood before hanging himself at the Angleterre Hotel in Leningrad.
- T. S. Eliot leaves Lloyds Bank in London and joins the new publishing house of Faber and Gwyer.
- An unofficial ban by Soviet authorities on poetry by Anna Akhmatova begins; she will be unable to publish until 1940.

== Works published ==
=== Canada ===
- Arthur Bourinot, Pattering Feet: A book of childhood verses.
- Archibald Lampman, Lyrics of Earth: Sonnets and Ballads, Duncan Campbell Scott ed. Posthumously published—not to be confused with Lampman's 1895 book of the same name.
- Marjorie Pickthall:
  - Little Songs (Toronto: McClelland & Stewart)
  - The Complete Poems of Marjorie Pickthall (Toronto: McClelland & Stewart).
- E. J. Pratt, The Witches' Brew, Toronto: Macmillan.
- Charles G. D. Roberts. The Sweet o' the Year and Other Poems. (Toronto: Ryerson).
- Theodore Goodridge Roberts. Seven Poems. private.
- Seranus, Songs of Love and Labor (Toronto: Author).

=== India in English ===
- Shyam Sunder Lal Chordia, Seeking and Other Poems (Poetry in English), Allahabad: The Indian Press
- M. U. Malkani and T. H. Advani, The Longing Lute (Poetry in English), Karachi: Kohinoor Printing Works

=== United Kingdom ===
- Edmund Blunden, Masks of Time
- Gordon Bottomley, Poems of Thirty Years
- Robert Bridges:
  - New Verse Written in 1921 which included his Neo-Miltonic syllabics
  - The Tapestry: Poems
- W. H. Davies, A Poet's Alphabet
- Cecil Day-Lewis, Beechen, Vigil, and Other Poems
- T. S. Eliot, Poems 1909-1925, including "The Hollow Men"
- 'Gawain Poet' (14th century), Sir Gawain and the Green Knight, edited by J. R. R. Tolkien and E. V. Gordon
- Robert Graves, Welchman's Hose
- Graham Greene, Babbling April
- Thomas Hardy, Human Shows, Far Phantasies, Songs and Trifles, the last work published in the author's lifetime
- Hugh MacDiarmid, pen name of Christopher Murray Grieve, Sangshaw
- Edwin Muir, First Poems
- Edith Sitwell, Troy Park
- Sylvia Townsend Warner, The Espalier
- Humbert Wolfe, The Unknown Goddess
- W. B. Yeats, A Vision

=== United States ===
- Léonie Adams, Those Not Elect
- Maxwell Anderson, You Who Have Dreams
- Stephen Vincent Benét, Tiger Joy
- Countee Cullen:
  - On These I Stand, Harper & Row
  - Color
- E. E. Cummings:
  - & (self-published)
  - XLI Poems
- Babette Deutsch, Honey Out of the Rock
- John Gould Fletcher, Parables
- H.D. (Hilda Doolittle), Collected Poems of H.D.
- Robert Hillyer, The Halt in the Garden
- Robinson Jeffers, Roan Stallion
- William Ellery Leonard, Two Lives
- Archibald MacLeish, The Pot of Earth
- Ezra Pound, A Draft of XVI Cantos, Paris
- Edwin Arlington Robinson, Dionysius in Doubt
- Eli Siegel, "Hot Afternoons Have Been in Montana"
- Ridgely Torrence, Hesperides

=== Other in English ===
- W. B. Yeats, A Vision, Ireland

== Works published in other languages ==
=== France ===
- Guillaume Apollinaire, pen name of Wilhelm Apollinaris de Kostrowitzky, Le cortege priapique, posthumously published (died 1918)
- Louis Aragon, Le Mouvement perpétuel
- Antonin Artaud:
  - L'ombilic des limbes ("The Umbilicus of Limbo"), poetry and essays, Paris: Nouvelle Revue Française
  - Le Pese-nerfs
- André Breton, Clair de terre
- Paul Claudel, Feuilles de saints
- Max Jacob, Les Penitants en maillots roses
- Francis Jammes:
  - Brindilles pour rallumer la foi, Paris: Éditions Spes
  - Livres des quatrains, published each year from 1922 to this year
- Raymond Radiguet, Les Joues en feu, published posthumously (author died this year)
- Pierre Reverdy, Grande Nature
- Jules Supervielle, Gravitations
- Charles Vildrac, Poèmes de l'Abbaye

=== Indian subcontinent ===
Including all of the British colonies that later became India, Pakistan, Bangladesh, Sri Lanka and Nepal. Listed alphabetically by first name, regardless of surname:

==== Hindi ====
- Jayashankar Prasad, Asu, Chayavadi poem on love and beauty
- Maithilisharan Gupta, Pancavati, a khanda kavya based on the Ram legend
- Mohan Lal Mahato Viyogi, Achuta, verses on social and political problems

==== Telugu ====
- Devulapalli Krishna Shastri, Krishna Paksham, a very prominent work of Telugu romantic literature
- Nanduri Venkata Subba Rao, Yenki Patalu (another source spells the title as Enki patalu; "The Songs of Yenki"), 35 lyrics in the language of common folk, on romantic love and the beauty of nature; a prominent work of modern Telagu poetry about "Enki" or "Yenki", a devoted, simple, country woman of Andhra dedicated to her lover, Naidu Bava "Yenki and her beloved Nayudu Bava have become living legends in modern Telugu literature", according to C. R. Sarma (the surname of the author is "Nanduri")
- Rayaprolu Subba Rao, Jada Kucculu, lyrics
- Visvanatha Satyanarayana, Kinnerasani patalu (also rendered Kinnera Sani Patalu; a lyrical epic in seven cantos) and Kokilamma Pelli, two works published in the same volume

==== Other Indian languages ====
- Altaf Husain Hali, Intikhab-i Sukhan, 11-volume anthology of Urdu poetry published from this year to 1943; each volume contains poems from several authors
- Ardoshir Faramji Kharbardar, Sandeshika (Indian Parsi writing in Gujarati)
- Dimbeshwar Neog, Thupitra, Assamese-language
- Keshavkumar, also known as P. K. Atre, Jhendici Phule, Marathi satirical and humorous poems
- Rabindranath Thakur, Purabi, Bengali, includes love poems
- Sita Nath Brahma Chaudhury, Kamal Kali, Assamese
- Syed jalal, Mahakmah-yi Nazir Ahmad, Shibli, Azad, Hali Ki inshapardazi par, work of Urdu criticism; a study of four Urdu poets: Nazir Ahmad, Shibli, Azad, and Hali
- D. T. Tatacharya, Kapinam Upavasah, satirical Sanskrit poem
- Tripuraneni Ramaswamy Choudhury, Suta puranamu, Telugu epic in four cantos

=== Spanish language ===
- Rafael Alberti, Marinero en tierra ("Sailor on Land"); Spain
- Rafael Méndez Dorich, Sensacionario (Buenos Aires), Peruvian poet published in Argentina
- José Gorostiza, Canciones para cantar en las barcas ("Songs to Sing on Boats"), Mexico
- Salvador Novo, XX Poemas ("20 Poems"), Mexico
- Miguel de Unamuno, De Fuerteventura a París ("From Fuerteventura to Paris"), Spain

=== Other languages ===
- Sophus Claussen, Heroica, including Atomernes Oprør ("Revolt of the Atoms"), Denmark
- Uri Zvi Greenberg, Eymah Gedolah Ve-Yareah ("A Great Fear and the Moon"), Hebrew language, Mandatory Palestine
- Lionel Léveillé, Chante, rossignol, chante, French language, Canada
- Eugenio Montale, Ossi di seppia ("Cuttlefish Bones"), first edition; second edition, 1928, with six new poems and an introduction by Alfredo Gargiulo; third edition, 1931, Lanciano: Carabba; Italy

== Awards and honors ==
- Dial Award: E.E. Cummings
- Pulitzer Prize for Poetry: Edwin Arlington Robinson, The Man Who Died Twice

== Births ==
Death years link to the corresponding "[year] in poetry" article:

- January 14 – Yukio Mishima (三島 由紀夫), pen name of Kimitake Hiraoka (平岡 公威) (died 1970), Japanese author, poet and playwright (Surname of this pen name: Mishima)
- January 20 – Jamiluddin Aali جمیل الدین عالی (died 2015), Indian-born Urdu poet, critic, playwright, essayist, columnist and scholar
- February 8 – Francis Webb (died 1973) Australian poet
- February 20 – Rivka Basman Ben-Hayim (died 2023), Lithuanian-born Yiddish poet and teacher
- February 22 – Gerald Stern (died 2022), American
- February 27 – Kenneth Koch (died 2002) American poet, playwright, professor and prominent poet of the "New York School" of poetry
- March 10 – Manolis Anagnostakis (died 2005) Greek poet and critic
- March 13 – Inge Müller (died 1966) East German
- March 14 – John Wain (died 1994) English poet, novelist and critic associated with the literary group The Movement.
- March 25 – Theodore Enslin (died 2011), American
- April 18 – Bob Kaufman (died 1986), American Beat poet and surrealist
- June 6 – Maxine Kumin (died 2014), American poet and author; Poet Laureate Consultant in Poetry to the Library of Congress in 1981–1982
- July 4 – Ciril Zlobec (died 2018), Slovene poet and politician
- August 1 – Ernst Jandl (died 2000), Austrian poet, author and translator
- August 12 – Donald Justice (died 2004), American poet and writing teacher
- August 16 – Bakhtiyar Vahabzadeh (died 2009), Azerbaijani poet and philologist
- September 16 – Samuel Menashe (died 2011), American poet; first to receive "The Neglected Masters Award" given by the U.S. Poetry Foundation in 2004
- October 8 – Philip Booth (died 2007), American poet and educator
- October 28 – Ian Hamilton Finlay (died 2006), Scottish poet, writer, artist and gardener
- November 15 – Heinz Piontek (died 2003), German
- November 27 – Munier Choudhury (died 1971), Bengali educator, playwright, literary critic and political dissident
- December 10 – Carolyn Kizer (died 2014), American poet and winner of the Pulitzer Prize for Poetry in 1985
- December 12 – Laurence Lerner (died 2016), South African-born poet and academic

== Deaths ==
Death years link to the corresponding "[year] in poetry" article:

- January 31 – George Washington Cable, 80, American novelist and poet
- February 15 – Kinoshita Rigen (木下利玄), pen-name of Kinoshita Toshiharu (born 1886), Japanese Meiji- and Taishō-period tanka poet (surname of this pen name: Rigen)
- February 22 – Nina Salaman, 47 (born 1877), English poet noted for her translations from medieval Hebrew poetry; cancer
- May 12 – Amy Lowell, 51 (born 1874), American poet of the imagist school; posthumously wins the Pulitzer Prize for Poetry in 1926
- June 6 – Pierre Louÿs, 54 (born 1870), French poet
- June 17 – A. C. Benson, 63, English author and poet who wrote the words to "Land of Hope and Glory"
- June 27 – A. D. Godley, 69, Irish-born English classical scholar and writer of light verse
- September 11 – Gustav Kastropp, 81 (born 1844) German poet and librettist
- October 27 – Darrell Figgis, 43 (born 1882), Irish poet and nationalist; suicide
- December 28 – Sergei Yesenin, 30, Russian poet

== See also ==
- Poetry
- List of poetry awards
- List of years in poetry
- New Objectivity in German literature and art
