= Humdrum and Harum-Scarum =

"Humdrum and Harum-Scarum: A Lecture on Free Verse" is an essay on poetic form by the poet Robert Bridges, first published in November 1922 in both the North American Review and the London Mercury.

In it Bridges details his views on the limitations of free verse. He argues that free verse, lacking the constraints of rhyme and metre, becomes too self-conscious. He argues instead for syllabic verse in the tradition of John Milton.

Bridges explains what he regards as the 'adverse conditions' that free verse imposes upon a poet:

1. loss of carrying power
2. self-consciousness
3. same-ness of line structure
4. indetermination of subsidiary 'accent'

== See also ==
- 1922 in poetry
