= A. J. Carruthers =

Australian poet and literary critic

A. J. Carruthers is an Australian-born literary critic and experimental poet.

== Biography ==
A.J. Carruthers (also aj carruthers) was born in Sydney, and is of mixed/Asian heritage. Since 2011, he has been writing a long poem called AXIS. His critical work has focused on North American and contemporary Australian poetry and poetics. He is an editor of Southerly, Rabbit Poetry Journal and the founder of SOd press.

== Published works ==
Books

- Stave Sightings: Notational Experiments in North American Long Poems, 1961–2011 (New York: Palgrave Macmillan, 2017)
- AXIS Book 1: Areal (Tokyo: Vagabond Press, 2014)
- Opus 16 on Tehching Hsieh (Oakland, CA: GaussPDF, 2016)
- Ode to On Kawara (Buffalo, NY: Hysterically Real, 2016)
- The Tulip Beds: A Toneme Suite (Tokyo: Vagabond Press, 2013

Anthologies

- Contemporary Asian Australian Poets (Sydney: Puncher & Wattmann, 2013)
- Active Aesthetics: Contemporary Australian Poetry (Berkeley, CA: Tuumba and Giramondo Press, 2016)

Exhibitions

- Selected Works (Non-Objective Writing, SNO Contemporary Art Projects)
