= Luke Icarus Simon =

Australian author, poet, actor, playwright and screenplay writer (born 1963)

Luke Icarus Simon (born 1963) is an Australian author, poet, actor, playwright and screenplay writer.

== Life ==
Simon was born in Nicosia, Cyprus, and immigrated to Sydney in 1974.

He made his professional theatre debut in 1980 aged 16, starring in Greek Theatre Workshop/Sidetrack Theatre's joint production of Antigone at Sydney's Seymour Centre. He is an Honors graduate in Australian Literature and Drama from the University of Sydney, where he performed in productions with Sydney University Dramatic Society (SUDS) including improvised live theatre in a weekly continuing role. Whilst still an undergraduate he began to have his short stories published in the University of Sydney's magazine, The Union Recorder. He went on to study theatre studies at the University of NSW and with Australian acting and voice teachers including Gale Edwards, Nick Enright, Dean Carey, Kevin Jackson, Lyn Pierse and Bill Pepper. He also holds a Postgraduate Diploma in Adult Education from the University of Technology, Sydney and a master's degree in education from the University of Wollongong.

Since graduation, he has worked in theatre (including 8 plays for Interplay), television (making his debut in the SBS TV series The Girl From Steel City), commercials (including campaigns for Telstra, Agree Hair Shampoo), training films, voiceovers (including campaigns for McDonald's, Citysearch.com.au) and feature films, Luigi's Ladies directed by Judy Morris, and AFTRS's Prima Nata. He was part of the cast of Breaking the Code at Marian St Theatre alongside theatre actor John Krummel. He had his first play, Urban Tales of Utter Devotion presented by Griffin Theatre's D Week in 1987, then wrote and starred in Fish Wednesday at Belvoir St Theatre. Fish Wednesday was lauded as the Critics' Choice play by the Sydney Morning Herald. His third play Sir was staged at the Griffin Theatre Company's Stables in 1993. He wrote, directed, produced, starred in and designed his 4th play A House On An Island In The Aegean at La Mama Theatre in Melbourne premiering on November 16, 2021.

He has more than 40 professional writing credits, including plays, screenplays, student films, teleplays (three for SBS TV and a final-year film for the Australian Film Television and Radio School, Schism, in which he also starred), an e-novel, short stories and poems published in anthologies and literary journals in Australia, the United States, Canada & Greece. His poems and short stories have been published in Antipodes (USA), Southerly, Overland, Mattoid, Westerly, The Australian Social Alternatives, Famous Reporter, Hobo, Akti (Greece), Outrider, Penguin's Australian Writing Now and other journals. His first poetry collection, Latin, was published by Picaro Press in 2011 and his second The Transit of Cancer in 2014.His other books include a short story collection, Lost In The Last Divided Capital in 2016 and The Gospel of the Fallen:New and Selected poems 1996-2016.

He was runner-up for the Terry Bell Memorial Prize with his story Apricots.

In 2006, his poem Father Was a Businessman was featured in the Sydney Writers' Festival as part of Redroom Company's Cabinet of Lost & Found exhibition.

Since 1997, he has also published literary criticism articles in the field of Australian poetry, fiction and drama mostly in the English Teachers journal Metaphor. Simon has also worked as a script editor and copywriter for a number of film companies.

He has also written, starred, co-produced and directed the 35mm short film, My Stamp Collection. The film was Highly Commended at the Cancer Council Victoria Arts Awards, toured regional galleries in Victoria, and was acquired by ABC-TV for an exclusive three-year broadcast commencing in March 2009. The film was broadcast five times on the national television network's channels, ABC1 and ABC2. The film has since been released for public viewing

== Works ==
- Fred S. Moramarco; Al Zolynas, eds. (2004). "Ravine". The poetry of men's lives: an international anthology. University of Georgia Press. ISBN 978-0-8203-2649-8.
- Michael Gow's Plays: A Thematic Approach, Sydney : Currency Press, 1991, ISBN 0-86819-280-5
- The Little Book On How To Stop Smoking. Cambria, Antonino, 2000, ISBN 978-1-876454-03-6
- My Stamp Collection(Film), 2006
- Latin, Warners Bay, N.S.W.: Picaro Press, 2011, ISBN 978-1-921691-24-9
- The Transit of Cancer, 2013 ISBN 978-0-994518224
- Fish Wednesday(Playwright), Australian Script Centre
- SIR(Playwright), Australian Script Centre
- Lost in the Last Divided Capital, 2014, ISBN 978-0-994518200
- The Gospel of the Fallen:New and Selected Poems 1996-2016, ISBN 978-0-994518248
- A House on an Island in the Aegean
