= Edmond Laforest =

Edmond Laforest (20 June 1876 – 17 October 1915) was a Haitian poet.

== Life and works ==
Born in Jérémie, Laforest was a teacher of French and mathematics. Some of his most noted works are Poèmes Mélancoliques (1901), Sonnets-Médaillons (1909), and Cendres et Flammes.

He killed himself by tying a Larousse dictionary around his neck and jumping off a bridge, to expose how the French language, imposed upon him by colonists, had killed him artistically.
