= 1940 in poetry =

Nationality words link to articles with information on the nation's poetry or literature (for instance, Irish or France).

== Events ==
- January – English literary magazine Horizon is first published in London by Cyril Connolly, Peter Watson and Stephen Spender
- June – French Resistance forms; poets who join include Louis Aragon, René Char, Robert Desnos, Paul Éluard, Francis Ponge, Jean Prévost and Jean-Pierre Rosnay
- July 26 – Release of the movie adaptation of Jane Austen's Pride and Prejudice with English poet and writer Aldous Huxley as a screenwriter
- English poet Basil Bunting joins the Royal Air Force and is eventually sent to Iran as an intelligence officer and translator
- Russian poet Anna Akhmatova's collection From Six Books is published in the Soviet Union but publication is suspended shortly after release, copies pulped and remaining issues prohibited
- American poet Louis Zukofsky finishes the first half of "A"

== Works published in English ==
Listed by nation where the work was first published and again by the poet's native land, if different; works listed again if substantially revised:

=== India, in English ===
- Mohendra Nath Dutt, Kurukshetra ( Poetry in English ), an epic; Calcutta: P. M. Mukherji
- P. R. Kaikini, The Recruit ( Poetry in English ), Bombay: New Book Co.
- Manjeri Sundaraman, Catguts ( Poetry in English ), Madras: Hurley Press

=== Canada ===
- A. M. Klein, Hath Not a Jew.
- E. J. Pratt, Brebeuf and his Brethren, Toronto: Macmillan, 1940. Detroit: Basilian Press, 1942. Governor General's Award 1940.

=== United Kingdom ===
- W. H. Auden, English poet living at this time in the United States:
  - Another Time, including "September 1, 1939"
  - Some Poems
- John Betjeman, Old Lights for New Chancels
- Edmund Blunden, Poems 1930–1940
- R. N. Currey, Tiresias
- Cecil Day-Lewis:
  - translation, The Georgics of Virgil (see also his translations of The Aeneid of Virgil 1952 and The Eclogues of Virgil 1963)
  - Poems in Wartime
- T. S. Eliot:
  - The Waste Land, and Other Poems, The Waste Land first published in 1923
  - East Coker, published in The New English Weekly, Easter Number; published in book form in June; republished in Four Quartets 1944
- William Empson, The Gathering Storm
- Roy Fuller, Poems
- Robert Garioch (pen name of Robert Garioch Sutherland) and Sorley MacLean (also known as Somhairle MacGill-Eain), 17 Poems for 6d. in Gaelic, Lowland Scots and English
- Rayner Heppenstall, Blind Men's Flowers are Green
- Hugh MacDiarmid, editor, The Golden Treasury of Scottish Poetry
- Louis MacNeice, The Last Ditch, including "The Coming of War" sequence, Northern Ireland poet published in Ireland
- Alice Meynell (died 1922), The Poems of Alice Meynell, complete edition
- R. F. Patterson, Mein Rant: a summary in light verse of "Mein Kampf"
- William Plomer, Selected Poems
- Francis Scarfe, Inscapes
- Stephen Spender, Selected Poems
- Dylan Thomas, Portrait of the Artist as a Young Dog
- Henry Treece, 38 Poems
- W. B. Yeats (died 1939), Last Poems and Plays

=== United States ===
- Conrad Aiken, And in the Human Heart
- W. H. Auden, English poet living at this time in the United States:
  - Another Time, including the famous "September 1, 1939"
  - Some Poems
- Leonard Bacon, Sunderland Capture
- Stephen Vincent Benét, Nightmare at Noon
- Witter Bynner, Against the Cold
- John Ciardi, Homeward to America
- E. E. Cummings, 50 Poems
- Richard Eberhart, Song and Idea
- Kenneth Fearing, Collected Poems
- Robert Hayden, Heart-Shape in the Dust
- Phyllis McGinley, A Pocketful of Wry
- Edna St. Vincent Millay, Make Bright the Arrows
- Ogden Nash, The Face is Familiar
- Ezra Pound, Cantos LII–LXXI
- Frederic Prokosch, Death at Sea
- Kenneth Rexroth, In What Hour
- Elizabeth Madox Roberts, Song in the Meadow

=== Other in English ===
- E. H. McCormick, Letters and Art in New Zealand, scholarship
- Ewart Milne, Letter from Ireland, Irish poet published in Ireland

== Works published in other languages ==
Listed by nation where the work was first published and again by the poet's native land, if different; works listed again if substantially revised:

=== Bulgaria ===
- Nikola Vaptsarov, „Моторни песни“ (Motor Songs)

=== France ===
- Louis Aragon, Le Crève-cœur
- Paul Éluard, pen name of Eugène Grindel, Le Livre ouvert, published from this year to 1941
- Pierre Reverdy, Plein Verre

=== Greece ===
- Odysseus Elytis's first book, Orientations
- Giorgos Seferis:
  - Τετράδιο Γυμνασμάτων ("Exercise Book")
  - Ημερολόγιο Καταστρώματος Ι ("Deck Diary I")

=== Indian subcontinent ===
Including all of the British colonies that later became India, Pakistan, Bangladesh, Sri Lanka. Listed alphabetically by first name, regardless of surname:

==== Bengali ====
- Premendra Mitra, Samrat
- Rabindranath Tagore:
  - Nabajatak, with themes and images from urban and industrial life (such as radios, railways and airplanes), a sharp contrast to the rural and natural themes of traditional Bengali poetry
  - Rogsayyay, written during his illness and with many images of sickness and worry, but without despondency (see also Arogya 1941, called a "companion volume" with a contrasting mood)
  - Sanai, poems with a nostalgic tone
  - Chelebela, autobiography concerning the author's childhood
- Samar Sen, Grahan o Anyana Kabita, Indian, Bengali-language
- Subhash Mukhopadhyay, Padatik, poems reflecting Marxist ideology and politics in general, with a combination of lyricism and sloganeering; the consonance and speech-like rhythm of these poems became popular and influential in Bengali poetry
- V. K. Gokak, also known as "Vinayaka", Samudra Gitagalu, poems about the potency and loveliness of the sea; the poems experiment with new diction and meters, including free verse

==== Hindi ====
- Narendra Sharma, Palas Van, mostly sensuous poems of love and beauty
- Ramadhari Singh Dinakar, Rasavanti
- Ayodhya Singh Upadhyay, also known as "Hariandha", Vaidehi Vanavas, based on Sita's exile

==== Kannada ====
- B. R. Bendre, also known as Ambikatanaya Datta, Sahitya Samsodhana, literary criticism on some older works of Kannada literature
- Muliya Timmappayya, Navanita Ramayana, the Ramayana in ragale meter
- S. V. Parameshwara Bhatt, Ragini, 28 love poems

==== Urdu ====
- Muhiuddin Qadri Zor, Ruh-i tanqid, introduction to principles of Western literary criticism
- Nasiruddin Hashmi, Khavatin-i Dakan Ki Urdu Khidmat, literary history on women Urdu writers from Deccan
- Syed Mohammad Hasnain, Jauhar-i-Iqbal, literary criticism in Urdu on the poetry of Sir Muhammad Iqbal's Urdu poetry

==== Other Indian languages ====
- Ahad Zargar, Tarana-e-Ahad Zargar, Sufistic ghazals and vatsans; Kashmiri
- Dimbeshwar Neog, Asamiya Sahityar Buranjit Bhumuki, a comprehensive review of early Assamese literature; criticism
- K. V. Jaganathan, Tamilkkavyankal, literary history of Tamil epics, compared to the traditions of Sanskrit poetry and world literature
- Kavi Nhanalal, Kuruksetra, final part of a 12-canto, Gujarati epic about the war of the Mahabharat, written in poetic prose, interspersed with songs (first canto published 1926)
- Maiyilai Seeni Venkataswamy, Pauttamum Tamilum, literary history on the influence of Buddhism on Tamil culture and literature
- N. M. Sant and Indira Sant, a poet and couple publishing together; N. M. Sant's poems show influences from Madhav Julian, Indira Sant's reflect folklore; Marathi
- Prahlad Parekh, Bari Bahar, called a "milestone in the history of Gujarati poetry of the post-Gandhian era" by Indian academic Siser Kumar Das
- Sankarambadi Sundarachari, Ma Telugu talliki malle pudanda, popular "prayer song" in Andhra, originally written for a film that was never completed, a record of the song was published, and its popularity led the government of Andhra Pradesh to declare it a prayer song to be sung along with Vandemataram

=== Spanish language ===
==== Spain ====
- Gerardo Diego, Angeles de Compostela ("Angels of Compostela"), 42 sonnets on diverse topics
- Federico García Lorca (killed 1936), Poeta en Nueva York ("A Poet in New York"), written in 1930 (first translation into English in 1988)
- Dionisio Ridruejo, Poesía en armas ("Poetry in Arms")

==== Other in Spanish ====
- César Vallejo (died 1938), España, aparta de mí este cáliz ("Spain, Take This Cup from Me"), Peruvian poet published in Mexico after the first attempt at publication was interrupted during the Spanish Civil War and all copies lost (that edition was printed by soldiers of the Army of the East, on paper they themselves had made)
- José Varallanos, Elegia en el mundo, Peruvian

== Awards and honors ==
- Pulitzer Prize for Poetry: Mark Van Doren: Collected Poems
- King's Gold Medal for Poetry: Michael Thwaites
- Governor General's Award, poetry or drama: Brébeuf and his Brethren, E. J. Pratt

== Births ==
Death years link to the corresponding "[year] in poetry" article:

- January 17 – Oswald Mbuyiseni Mtshali, South African poet
- January 30 – Sterling D. Plumpp, African-American
- February 9 – Seamus Deane (died 2021), Irish poet, novelist and academic
- March 23 – Ama Ata Aidoo (died 2023), Ghanaian author, poet and playwright
- April 11 – Emmanuel Hocquard (died 2019), French
- April 16 – Rolf Dieter Brinkmann (died 1975), German
- April 25 – Peter Wild (died 2009), American poet and historian, professor at the University of Arizona in Tucson
- May 7 – Angela Carter, née Stalker (died 1992), English magic realist novelist and poet
- May 20 – Ahmadreza Ahmadi (died 2023), Iranian poet and screenwriter
- May 24 – Joseph Brodsky, born Iosif Aleksandrovich Brodsky (died 1996), Russian-born American poet and essayist, winner of the Nobel Prize in Literature (1987) and Poet Laureate of the United States (1991–1992)
- June 13 – David Budbill (died 2016), American poet and playwright
- June 23 – Amal Abul-Qassem Donqol (died 1983), Egyptian Arabic poet
- August 14 – Judith Kazantzis, née Pakenham (died 2018), English poet and activist
- September 2 – Harry Northup, American poet and actor
- September 8 – Jack Prelutsky, American poet noted for children's poems
- September 10 – John Curl, American poet, memoirist, translator, author, activist and historian
- October 11 – David McFadden (died 2018), Canadian poet and travel writer
- October 15 – Fanny Howe, American poet, novelist and short story writer and recipient of the 2009 Ruth Lilly Poetry Prize
- October 20 – Robert Pinsky, American poet and Poet Laureate of the United States (1997–2000)
- November 1 – William Heyen, American poet, editor and literary critic
- November 5 – Dmitri Prigov (died 2007), Russian poet
- November 19 – Peter Cooley, American poet and academic
- December 14 – Carolyn Rodgers (died 2010), American poet, leading participant of the Black Arts Movement of the 1960s and 1970s and founder of one of the country's oldest and largest black-owned book publishers
- December 21
  - Kelly Cherry, American writer
  - Rolf Sagen (died 2017), Norwegian writer
- Also:
  - Martha Collins, American
  - Michael Jackson, New Zealand anthropologist and poet
  - Paul Mariani, American poet and academic
  - Pattiann Rogers, American poet
  - Andrew Waterman (died 2022), English poet and academic

== Deaths ==
Birth years link to the corresponding "[year] in poetry" article:

- January 5 – Humbert Wolfe (born 1885), British poet and epigrammist
- March 4 – Hamlin Garland (born 1860), American novelist, poet, essayist and short story writer
- March 7 – Edwin Markham (born 1852), American poet
- March 23 – Minakami Takitarō 水上滝太郎 pen name of Abe Shōzō (born 1887), Shōwa period Japanese poet, novelist, literary critic and essayist (surname: Minakami)
- May 18 – Jacob Hiegentlich (born 1907), gay Dutch Jewish writer who also wrote poetry in German, suicide
- June 21 – Hendrik Marsman (born 1899), Dutch poet (died in sinking of SS Berenice)
- August 21 – Ernest Thayer (born 1863), American writer and poet who wrote "Casey at the Bat"
- September 26 – W. H. Davies (born 1871), Welsh-born poet and writer who spent most of his life as a tramp in the United States and United Kingdom, but became known as one of the most popular poets of his time
- October 11 – Taneda Santōka 種田 山頭火 pen name of Taneda Shōichi 種田 正 (born 1882), Japanese author and haiku poet (surname: Taneda)
- December 27 – Ella Rhoads Higginson (born 1862), American poet

== See also ==
- Poetry
- List of poetry awards
- List of years in poetry
