= 1922 in poetry =

April is the cruellest month, breeding

Lilacs out of the dead land, mixing
Memory and desire, stirring
Dull roots with spring rain.
Winter kept us warm, covering
Earth in forgetful snow, feeding

A little life with dried tubers.

— Opening lines from The Waste Land by T. S. Eliot, first published this year

Nationality words link to articles with information on the nation's poetry or literature (for instance, Irish or France).

== Events ==
- February 2
  - Who Goes with Fergus? by W. B. Yeats (first published in 1892) is the song that haunts James Joyce's autobiographical character Stephen Dedalus in the novel Ulysses, first published complete in book form today. Stephen sings it to his mother as she lies dying, and her ghost returns to taunt him with it. The poem is Joyce's favorite lyric, and he has composed his own musical setting.
  - In a "savage creative storm" of less than three weeks beginning today at the Château de Muzot in Switzerland, Rainer Maria Rilke writes his Sonnets to Orpheus (Die Sonette an Orpheus) and completes his Duino Elegies (Duineser Elegien).
- April – The Fugitive is established in Nashville, Tennessee, by John Crowe Ransom and other members of the Vanderbilt University English faculty who become known collectively as the Fugitives.
- June – Over a single night at his home in Shaftsbury, Vermont, Robert Frost completes the long poem "New Hampshire" and at sunrise writes "Stopping by Woods on a Snowy Evening".
- July – Having issued a 2nd edition of António Botto's poetry collection Canções through his Portuguese publishing house Olisipo, Fernando Pessoa publishes a magazine article praising Botto's courage and sincerity in shamelessly singing homosexual love as a true aesthete, sparking controversy over literatura de Sodoma.
- September 22 – Indian Bengali poet Kazi Nazrul Islam publishes the poem "Anandamoyeer Agamane" ("The Advent of the Delightful Mother"), in support of the Indian independence movement, in the Puja issue of his new biweekly magazine Dhumketu, for which he is arrested by the police of the Bengal Presidency and imprisoned on a charge of sedition for much of the following year, undertaking a hunger strike and composing many poems while in prison. His poem "Bidrohi" (বিদ্রোহী, "The Rebel", December 1921) is first collected this year in his first anthology, Agnibeena.
- October 15 – T. S. Eliot establishes The Criterion magazine, containing the first publication of his poem The Waste Land. This first appears in the United States later this month in The Dial (dated November 1) and is first published complete with notes in book form by Boni and Liveright in New York in December.
- November – Robert Bridges publishes his essay on free verse: 'Humdrum and Harum-Scarum'.
- December 6 – W. B. Yeats becomes a nominated member of Seanad Éireann in the Irish Free State.

== Works published in English ==
=== Australia ===
- Will H. Ogilvie, Galloping Shoes: Verses

=== Canada ===
- William Wilfred Campbell (died 1918), The Poetical Works of Wilfred Campbell, W.J. Sykes ed. (London)
- William Douw Lighthall, Old Measures (collected verse) (Montreal: A.T. Chapman)
- Marjorie Pickthall, The Woodcarver’s Wife, and Later Poems]. Toronto: McClelland & Stewart

=== Indian subcontinent in English ===
Including all of the British colonies that later became India, Pakistan, Bangladesh, Sri Lanka and Nepal:

- Swami Ananda Acharya:
  - The Comrade: Poems on Philosophical Themes ( Poetry in English ), Alvdal, Norway: Gaurisankar Brahmakul, 105 pages
  - Usarika, Dawn-Rhythms ( Poetry in English ), Alvdal, Norway: Gaurisankar Brahmakul
- Christina A. Albers, Ancient Tales of Hindustan
- Sri Aurobindo, Baji Prabhou ( Poetry in English ), Pondicherry: Arya Office
- N. M. Chatterjee, Parvati
- Harindranath Chattopadhyaya:
  - The Magic Tree ( Poetry in English ), Madras: Shama's Publishing House (another source gives the publisher as: Madras: Theosophical Publishing House)
  - Perfume of Earth ( Poetry in English ), Madras: printed at Huxley Press
- Joseph Furtado, Lays of Goa and Lyrics of Goan, a souvenir of the exposition of St. Francis Xavier; Bombay: Furtado and Sons
- Puran Singh, At His Feet ( Poetry in English ), Gwalior,

=== United Kingdom ===
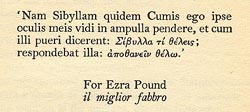
Epigraph & dedication, T. S. Eliot's Waste Land

- Marion Angus, The Lilt and Other Verses, Scottish poet writing in the Scots language
- Edmund Blunden, The Shepherd, and Other Poems of Peace and War
- Enid Blyton, Child Whispers
- Hilda Conkling, Shoes of the Wind
- A. E. Coppard, Hips and Haws
- John Drinkwater, Preludes 1921–1922
- T. S. Eliot, The Waste Land
- Wilfrid Gibson, Krindlesdyke
- Thomas Hardy, Late Lyrics and Earlier, with Many Other Verses
- Laurence Hope [Violet (Adela Florence) Nicolson (suicide 1904)], Selected Poems from the Indian Love Lyrics of Laurence Hope, edited by son M. J. Nicolson
- A. E. Housman, Last Poems
- James Pittendrigh Macgillivray, Bog Myrtle and Peat Reek, Scottish poet writing chiefly in dialect
- Susan Miles, Annotations
- E. Nesbit, Many Voices
- Alfred Noyes, The Watchers of the Sky, Volume i of the "Torch-Bearers Trilogy", followed by The Book of the Earth (1925), The Last Voyage (1930), published as The Torch-Bearers (1937)
- Marjorie Pickthall, The Wood Carver's Wife, including "Marching Men"
- Poems of Today, British poetry anthology, second series
- Isaac Rosenberg (killed on active service 1918), Poems
- Edith Sitwell, Façade, the concert version ('an entertainment'), with music by William Walton, performed January 1922
- Sacheverell Sitwell, The Hundred and One Harlequins, and Other Poems
- J. C. Squire, Poems: Second Series
- Muriel Stuart, Poems
- Amabel Williams-Ellis, An Anatomy of Poetry (criticism)
- W. B. Yeats, Irish poet published in the United Kingdom:
  - Later Poems, Macmillan's Collected Edition of Yeats's Works, volume i
  - Plays in Prose and Verse, Macmillan's Collected Edition of Yeats's Works, volume ii

=== United States ===
- Conrad Aiken, Priapus and the Pool
- John Peale Bishop, with Edmund Wilson, The Undertaker's Garland
- John Dos Passos, A Pushcart at the Curb
- James Weldon Johnson, Book of American Negro Poetry
- Claude McKay, Harlem Shadows
- Hughes Mearns, Antigonish, often called "The Little Man Who Wasn't There"; inspired by reports of a ghost of a man roaming the stairs of a haunted house in Antigonish, Nova Scotia; written in 1899 and first published on March 22 by Franklin Pierce Adams in his New York World column; later a popular song
- Louise Pound, American Ballads and Songs
- Elizabeth Madox Roberts, Under the Tree
- Carl Sandburg, Slabs of the Sunburnt West
- George Santayana, Soliloquies in England and Later Soliloquies
- Gertrude Stein, Geography and Plays
- John Hall Wheelock, The Black Panther
- William Carlos Williams, Spring and All, including "The Red Wheelbarrow"
- Yvor Winters, The Magpie's Shadow

=== Other ===
- W. B. Yeats, Irish poet published in the United Kingdom:
  - Later Poems, Macmillan's Collected Edition of Yeats's Works, volume i
  - Plays in Prose and Verse, Macmillan's Collected Edition of Yeats's Works, volume ii

== Works published in other languages ==
=== France ===
- Paul Claudel, Poèmes de guerre (1914-1916)
- Francis Jammes, Livres des quatrains, published each year from this year to 1925
- Oscar Vladislas de Lubicz-Milosz, also known as O. V. de L. Milosz, La Confession de Lemuel
- Alphonse Métérié, Le Livre des soeurs
- Pierre Reverdy, Cravates de chanvre
- Philippe Soupault, Westwego
- Paul Valéry, Charmes

=== Germany ===
- Rainer Maria Rilke completes both the Duino Elegies and the Sonnets to Orpheus; Germany
- Kurt Schwitters:
  - Anna Blume, Dichtungen, including "An Anna Blume" ("To Anna Flower" also translated as "To Eve Blossom"); a second, revised edition with nine instead of the original 20 poems, and with the addition of translations of Anna Blume into English, French and Russian; published by Verlag Paul Steegemann, Hanover (first edition 1919, a second edition with the only change being eight more pages of advertising, published in 1920), Germany
  - Memoiren Anna Blumes in Bleie, a chronicle and parody of reactions to the original Anna Blume, Dichtungen of 1919

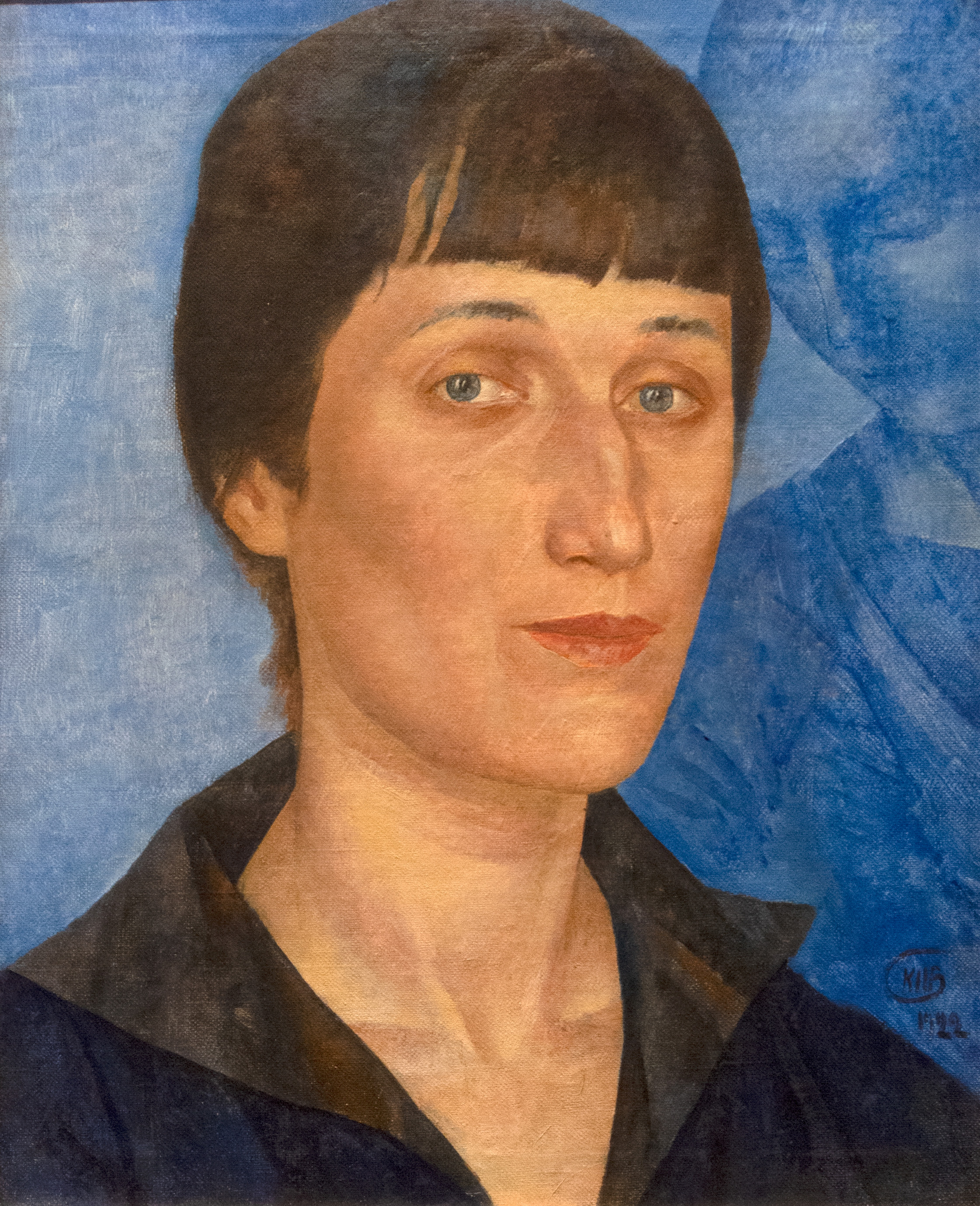
1922 portrait, Anna Akhmatova

=== Spanish language ===
- Xavier Abril, Hollywood, Peru
- Manuel Maples Arce, Andamios interiores (Poemas radiograficos), Mexico
- Gerardo Diego, Manual de espumas ("Manual of Foam"), Spain
- Gabriela Mistral, Desolación ("Despair"), including "Decalogo del artista", New York : Instituto de las Españas; Chilean poet published in the United States
- César Vallejo, Trilce, Peru
- Pablo de Rokha: Los gemidos

=== Other languages ===
- Anna Akhmatova, Anno Domini MCMXXI, Soviet Union
- Mário de Andrade, Paulicéia Desvairada ("Untapped São Paulo", "Hallucinated City"), Brazil
- Tom Kristensen, Paafuglefjeren ("The Peacock Feather"), Denmark
- Mohammad Yamin, Tanah Air ("Motherland"), Indonesia, modern Malay language

== Awards and honors ==
- Hawthornden Prize for poetry: Edmund Blunden
- Pulitzer Prize for Poetry (first award): Edwin Arlington Robinson, Collected Poems (1921)

== Births ==
Death years link to the corresponding "[year] in poetry" article:

- January 22 – Vernon Scannell, born John Vernon Bain (died 2007), English poet, author and professional boxer
- February 25 – Leland Bardwell (died 2016), Indian-born Irish poet and novelist
- March 5 – Pier Paolo Pasolini (murdered 1975), Italian film director, novelist and Friulian language poet
- March 12 – Jack Kerouac (died 1969), American novelist, writer, poet, artist, and part of the Beat Generation school of poetry
- April 4 – Máire Mhac an tSaoi, Irish poet and scholar
- April 16 – Kingsley Amis (died 1995), English novelist and poet
- June 9 – John Gillespie Magee, Jr. (killed in military aviation accident 1941), Anglo–American aviator and poet
- June 30
  - Amulya Barua (died 1946; first published posthumously in 1964), Indian, Assamese-language
  - Miron Białoszewski (died 1983), Polish poet and playwright
- July 6 – Carilda Oliver Labra (died 2018), Cuban
- July 17 – Donald Davie (died 1995), English poet and critic, member of the Movement
- July 26 – Chairil Anwar (died 1949), Indonesian poet of the "1945 Generation"
- August 9 – Philip Larkin (died 1985), English poet, novelist, jazz critic and librarian
- August 26 – Elizabeth Brewster (died 2012), Canadian poet and academic
- September 12 – Jackson Mac Low (died 2004), American poet, performance artist, composer and playwright
- November 13 – Makarand Dave (died 2005), Indian, Gujarati-language poet, writer and editor
- November 24 – Aris Alexandrou (Άρης Αλεξάνδρου, died 1978), Greek novelist, poet and translator
- November 25 – Fumiko Nakajo 中城ふみ子, pen name of Noe Fumiko 野江富美子 (died of breast cancer 1954), Japanese tanka poet with a turbulent life
- December 3 – Eli Mandel (died 1992), Canadian poet and literary academic
- Also –
  - Peter Bladen (died 2001), Australian
  - Ahmad Hardi (died 2006), Kurdish

== Deaths ==
Birth years link to the corresponding "[year] in poetry" article:

- January 21 – John Kendrick Bangs, 59, American author, satirist, poet and the creator of Bangsian fantasy, a school of fantasy writing that sets the plot wholly or partially in the afterlife
- February 2 – Zahida Khatun Sherwani, writing as Zay Khay Sheen (born 1894), Indian Urdu language woman poet
- February 3 – John Butler Yeats (born 1839), Irish painter and poet, father of W. B. Yeats
- April 19 - Marjorie Pickthall (born 1883), English-born Canadian writer.
- May 13 – Sir Walter Raleigh (born 1861), Scottish scholar, poet and author
- June 28 – Velimir Khlebnikov, 36 (born 1885), Russian Futurist poet and writer
- July 4 – Laura Rosamond White, 77 (born 1844), American poet, author, and editor
- July 8 – Mori Ōgai 森 鷗外 / 森 鴎外 (born 1862), Japanese physician, translator, novelist and poet
- August 2 – M. A. Bayfield, 70 (born 1852), English classical scholar and writer on poetry
- September 2 – Henry Lawson, 55, Australian writer and poet
- September 10 – Wilfrid Scawen Blunt, 82 (born 1840), British poet and writer
- November 27 – Alice Meynell, 75 (born 1847), née Thompson, English writer, editor, critic and suffragist, remembered mainly as a poet
- December 4 – Josephine Peabody (born c. 1874), American poet and playwright

== See also ==
- Poetry
- List of years in poetry
