= Mir Hasan (poet) =

18th century Urdu poet

Mir Ghulam Hasan
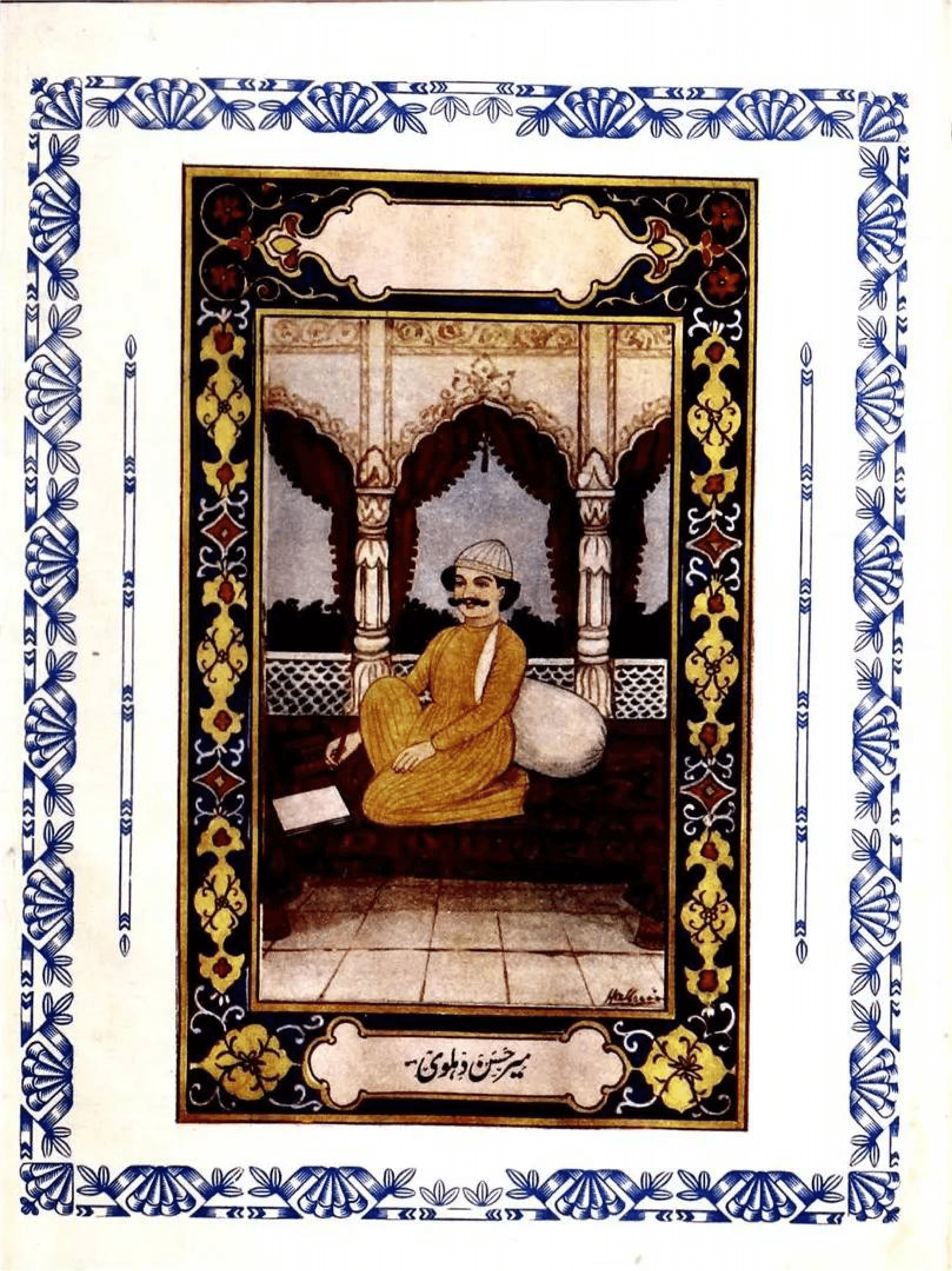
- Traditional portrait of Mir Hasan (published 1941), reproduced from an 18th-century manuscript.
- Born: 1736; Delhi
- Died: 1786 (aged 49–50); Lucknow
- Writing career
- Pen name: Hasan
- Language: Urdu, Persian

Mir Ghulam Hasan, known simply as Mīr Ḥasan or Mir Hasan Dehlavi, was an biographer, critic, and Urdu poet.

He is known for his masnavis, the most famous being Sihar-ul-Bayan. Other notable works include a diwan of ghazals and Tazkira-i-Shora-i-Urdu, a tazkira of Urdu poets, written in Persian.

== Biography ==
Mir Hasan's ancestors were Sayyids who belonged to Herat. His great grandfather Mir Imami migrated to India.

Mir Hasan was born in Delhi. His father, Mir Zahik, was a poet. Mir Hasan was educated in Urdu and Persian, and studied poetry as a child, submitting his poems to Khwaja Mir Dard for correction. After the invasion of India 1739 by Nader Shah, his father emigrated to Faizabad, the capital of Oudh.

When the capital of Awadh was changed to Lucknow, Mir Hasan also settled there. He died in Lucknow after a period of illness. He left behind four sons, three of whom were poets themselves.

== Notable works ==
- Dīvān-i Mīr Ḥasan, A diwan of ghazals
- Eleven masnavis, of which Sihar-ul-Bayan is the most famous.
- Tazkira-i-Shora-i-Urdu, a tazkira of Urdu poets, written in Persian

== Bibliography ==
- Sāḥil Aḥmad (1997). Mīr Ḥasan kī g̲h̲azal go'ī (in Urdu). Allahabad: Urdū Rā'iṭars Gilḍ.
- Mahmud Faruqi (1953). Mir Hasan aur Khandan ke Dusre Shuara (in Urdu). Lahore.
- Faz̤lulḥaq (1973). Mīr Ḥasan: ḥayāt aur adabī k̲h̲idmāt (in Urdu).
- Muḥammad Iḥsānulḥaq (1979). Mīr Ḥasan, 'ahd aur fann (in Urdu). Lāhaur: Sang-i Mīl Pablīkeshanz.
- Ralph Russel (1968). Khurshid ul-Islam. Cambridge.
- Ralph Russell (1968). Three Mughal poets; Mir, Sauda, Mir Hasan. Cambridge: Harvard University Press.
- Raz̤iyah Sult̤ānah (1964). Mas̲navī siḥr al-bayān, Ek tahz̲ībī mut̤āla'ah (in Urdu). Kitāb Bhavan.
