= 1939 in poetry =

As the clever hopes expire
Of a low dishonest decade

— W. H. Auden, from "September 1, 1939"

Nationality words link to articles with information on the nation's poetry or literature (for instance, Irish or France).

== Events ==
- January
  - Last issue of The Criterion is published
  - The Kenyon Review is established by John Crowe Ransom
- January/February – Poetry London: a Bi-Monthly of Modern Verse and Criticism, founded and edited by Tambimuttu (with Dylan Thomas and others), is first published
- February 17 – Gunga Din, a film directed by George Stevens, based loosely on Rudyard Kipling's poem of the same name, is released in the United States
- June – Rolfe Humphries, a former student of Nicholas Murray Butler at Columbia University, publishes in the magazine Poetry "Draft Ode for a Phi Beta Kappa Occasion", following a classical format of blank verse with one classical reference per line but with the first letters of each line of the resulting acrostic spelling out the message "Nicholas Murray Butler is a horses [sic.] ass"; upon learning of the "hidden" message, the irate editors run an apology in the August issue
- Carl Rakosi begins a 28-year hiatus from writing poetry

== Works published in English ==
=== Australian ===
- Mary Gilmore, Battlefields, Sydney, Angus and Robertson
- Kenneth Slessor, Five Bells : XX Poems, Sydney: F.C. Johnson

=== Canada ===
- Arthur Bourinot, Under the Sun (1939 Governor General's Award)
- Anne Marriott, The Wind Our Enemy, Toronto: Ryerson Press

=== India, in English ===
- Harindranath Chattopadhyaya, The Dark Well (Poetry in English), Madras: Kalakshetra
- Tandra Devi, Poems (Poetry in English), Srinagar: Tandra Devi Publications
- P. R. Kaikini, Shanghai (Poetry in English), Bombay: New Book Co.

=== New Zealand ===
- Ursula Bethell, Day and Night : Poems 1924-34, by the author of 'Time and Place, Christchurch: Caxton Press
- Charles Brasch, The Land and the People, and Other Poems, Christchurch: Caxton Press
- Allen Curnow, Not in Narrow Seas, Christchurch: Caxton Press

=== United Kingdom ===
- W. H. Auden and Christopher Isherwood, Journey to a War, verse and nonfiction prose, published March 16; includes "In Time of War", a sonnet sequence with verse commentary by Auden; diary and prose by Isherwood
- W. H. Auden, "September 1, 1939", a poem written on the occasion of the outbreak of World War II, first published in The New Republic on October 18, and which will later appear in Auden's collection Another Time (1940); at this time Auden is an English poet living in the United States
- George Barker, Elegy on Spain
- Roy Campbell, Flowering Rifle: A poem from he battlefield of Spain
- W. H. Davies, The Loneliest Mountain, and Other Poems
- T. S. Eliot:
  - Old Possum's Book of Practical Cats
  - "The Marching Song of the Pollicle Dogs" and "Billy M'Caw: The Remarkable Parrot", contributions to The Queen's Book of the Red Cross anthology
- Gavin Ewart, Poems and Songs
- Geoffrey Grigson, editor, New Verse, anthology
- J. F. Hendry and Henry Treece, editors, The New Apocalypse, an early anthology of the New Apocalyptics poets in Britain
- A. E. Housman, Collected Poems
- Louis MacNeice, Autumn Journal
- Ruth Pitter, The Spirit Watches
- Enoch Powell, Casting-off, and Other Poems, Oxford: Blackwell’s
- Lady Margaret Sackville, Collected Poems
- Christopher Smart, Rejoice in the Lamb: A Song from Bedlam, the first publication of Smart's Jubilate Agno (written during his asylum confinement 1757–1758) edited by W. F. Stead (includes the lines beginning "For I will consider my Cat Jeoffry")
- William Soutar, In the Time of Tyrants
- Julian Symons, Confusions About X
- Dylan Thomas, The Map of Love, verse and fiction
- W. B. Yeats, Last Poems and Two Plays, Irish poet published in the United Kingdom, published posthumously in July

=== United States ===
- W. H. Auden:
  - "September 1, 1939" a poem written on the occasion of the outbreak of World War II, first published in The New Republic on October 18, and which will later appear in Auden's collection Another Time (1940); at this time Auden is an English poet living in the United States
  - With Christopher Isherwood, The Journey to a War
- Stephen Vincent Benét, The Ballad of the Duke's Mercy
- Paul Engle, Corn
- Robert Frost, Collected Poems
- Archibald MacLeish, America Was Promises
- Josephine Miles, Lines at Intersection
- Edna St. Vincent Millay, Huntsman, What Quarry?
- Kenneth Patchen, First Will and Testament
- Muriel Rukeyser, A Turning Wind
- May Sarton, Inner Landscape
- Edward Taylor, The Poetical Works, edited by Thomas H. Johnson
- Mark Van Doren, Collected Poems
- Thomas Wolfe, The Face of a Nation

=== Other in English ===
- W. B. Yeats, Last Poems and Two Plays, Irish poet published in the United Kingdom, published posthumously in July

== Works published in other languages ==
=== France ===
- Aimé Césaire, Cahier d'un retour au pays natal ("Notebook of a Return to My Native Land"), a landmark work in French Caribbean literature, which had previously been characterized by literary works derivative of European models and often marked by exoticism; this book-length poem, according to Bonnie Thomas, "laid the foundations for a new literary style in which Caribbean writers came to reject the alienating gaze of the Other in favour of their own Caribbean interpretation of reality", a change expressed in the theory of négritude; Martinique poet published in France, Volontés (Paris), August; (enlarged edition in book format, 1947; definitive edition, 1956)
- Paul Éluard, pen name of Paul-Eugène Grindel, Chanson complète
- Luc Estang, Transhumances
- Leon-Paul Fargue, Le Piéton de Paris
- Tristan Tzara, Midis gagnés

=== Indian subcontinent ===
Including all of the British colonies that later became India, Pakistan, Bangladesh, Sri Lanka and Nepal. Listed alphabetically by first name, regardless of surname:

==== Urdu ====
- Akbar Allahabadi, Kulliyat-i Akbar Allahabadi, in four volumes, published (posthumously) from 1935 through this year; Urdu-language
- Mir Hasan, Maghribi tasanif ke Urdu tarajim, treatise in Urdu on the difficulties of translating Western literature into the Urdu language; one of the earlier studies of translation into any Indian language
- Muhammad Tahir Farooqi, Sirat-i Iqbal, biography of Muhammad Iqbal, with appraisals of his poetry
- Nushur Vahidi, Sabha-i Hindi, mostly traditional poems; Urdu

==== Other Indian languages ====
- Baikunthanath Pattnayak, Myttika Darsana, long elegy on the death of his son; Oriya
- Balamani Amma, Strihrdayam ("The Heart of a Woman"), Malayalam
- Bapiraju, Ssikala, love poems; Telugu
- Changampuzha Krishna Pillai, Rahtapuspangal, includes Vazhakkula ("A Bunch of Bananas"), which exerted a strong influence on revolutionary Malayalam poetry in the next few decades
- Khalairakpam Chaoba, Thainagi Leirang ("Ancient Flowers"), Meitei
- Mahjoor, Payam-e Mahjoor, popular lyrics; Kashmiri
- Rameshvar Shukla, Aparajita Indian poetry, Hindi-language
- Sundaram, Vasudha, poems about social change and reflecting the influence of Mohandas Karamchand Gandhi on Indian society; Gujarati
- Suryakant Tripathi 'Nirala', Tulsidas, long poem on the life and characteristics of Tulsidas, Hindi
- U. M. Dandpota, Abyat-i-Sindhi, critical appraisal in Sindhi of the Sindhi couplets of Kkwaja Muhammad Zaman (1713–1774)
- Umashankar Joshi, Nishith, lyrics, songs, sonnets and longer poems; received the Bharatiya Jnanpith Award in 1968; Gujarati
- Visvanatha Satyanarayana, Srimad Ramayana Kalpavrksamu, the author's magnum opus, according to Indian literary scholar Siser Kumar Das; it won the Jnanapith Award; a free rendering of the Ramayana; the first canto was published in 1930, the last in 1957; Telugu

=== Other languages ===
- Vladimir Cavarnali, Răsadul verde al inimii stelele de sus îl plouă ("The heart's green seedling is rained upon by the stars above")
- Tove Ditlevsen, Pigesind and Slangen i Paradiset, Denmark
- José Gorostiza, Muerte sin fin ("Death without end"), Mexico
- W. J. Hartmann, comp., Sie alle fielen: Gedichte europäischer Soldaten ("They all fell in battle: poems of European soldiers"), translations into German
- D. Gwenallt Jones, Ysgubau'r Awen, Welsh poet published in the United Kingdom
- Eugenio Montale, Le occasioni ("The Occasions"), Turin: Einaudi; Italy
- César Vallejo, posthumously published (died in 1936), Peru:
  - Poemas humanos ("Human Poems")
  - Sermón de la barbarie ("Sermon on Barbarism")

== Awards and honors ==
- Governor General's Award, poetry or drama: Under the Sun, Arthur S. Bourinot (Canada)

=== United States ===
- American Academy of Arts and Letters Gold Medal for Poetry: Robert Frost
- Pulitzer Prize for Poetry: John Gould Fletcher: Selected Poems

== Births ==
Death years link to the corresponding "[year] in poetry" article:

- January 10 – Jared Carter, American poet, winner of the 1980 Walt Whitman Award
- January 23 – Fred Wah, Chinese-Canadian poet, novelist, and scholar
- February 5 – Siv Cedering (died 2007), Swedish-American poet, painter, sculptor, illustrator, and author
- February 22 – Katerina Anghelaki-Rooke (died 2020), Greek (died 2020)
- February 26 – Clark Coolidge, American
- March 3 – Hans Verhagen (died 2020), Dutch journalist, poet, painter and filmmaker
- March 26 – Patrick Lane (died 2019), Canadian
- April 13 – Seamus Heaney (died 2013), Irish writer and lecturer from Northern Ireland awarded the Nobel Prize in Literature in 1995
- April 16 – Diane Wood Middlebrook, née Helen Diane Wood (died 2008), American poet, academic and biographer
- April 25 – Ted Kooser, American poet and 13th Poet Laureate of the United States, serving two terms from 2004 to 2006
- May 7 – Volker Braun, German
- May 11 – Samih al-Qasim (died 2014), Palestinian
- May 23 – Stanley Plumly (died 2019), American poet and academic
- May 27 – Frank Bidart, American
- May 31 – Al Young (died 2021), American poet, novelist and writer of musical memoirs named poet laureate of California in 2005
- June 6 – Lee Harwood (died 2015), English poet associated with the British Poetry Revival
- June 24 – Stephen Dunn, American poet and winner of the Pulitzer Prize for Poetry
- June 30 – José Emilio Pacheco (died 2014), Mexican poet, essayist, translator, novelist and short story writer
- July 22 – Quincy Troupe, American poet, editor, journalist, and academic
- July 27 – Michael Longley (died 2025), Northern Irish poet
- August 8 – Dick Allen (died 2017), American poet, literary critic and academic
- August 18 – Sándor Tóth (died 2019), Hungarian poet, journalist and politician
- August 31 – Dennis Lee, Canadian children's writer and poet
- October 7 – Clive James (died 2019), Australian-born writer and poet
- October 24 – Paula Gunn Allen (died 2008), Native American poet, literary critic, activist and novelist
- November 11 – Bimbo Rivas, born Bittman Rivas (died 1992), Puerto Rican-born actor, community activist, director, playwright, poet and teacher
- November 18 – Margaret Atwood, Canadian novelist and poet
- November 23 – Bill Bissett, Canadian poet
- Also:
  - Charles Boer, American
  - Michael Coady (died 2024), Irish poet, short story writer, local historian, genealogist, photographer, journalist and musician
  - Philip Dacey, American
  - James L. McMichael, American
  - Heather Ross Miller, American poet, author and academic
  - Primus St. John, American

== Deaths ==
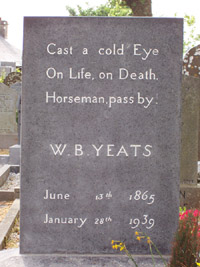
Yeats' gravestone, with his famous epitaph, erected 1948.

Birth years link to the corresponding "[year] in poetry" article:

- January 28 – W. B. Yeats (born 1865), Irish poet
- February 2 – Amanda McKittrick Ros (born 1860), Irish novelist and poet noted for her purple style
- February 18 – Okamoto Kanoko 岡本かの子, pen name of Ohnuki Kano, (born 1889) Japanese author, tanka poet and Buddhist scholar in the Taishō and early Shōwa periods; mother of artist Tarō Okamoto
- February 22 – Antonio Machado (born 1875), Spanish poet
- March 7 – Ludwig Fulda (born 1862), German playwright and poet, suicide
- March 29 – Tachihara Michizō 立原道造 (born 1914), Japanese poet and architect (surname: Michizō)
- June 14 – Vladislav Khodasevich (born 1886), Russian poet and critic
- July 19 – Rose Hartwick Thorpe (born 1850), American poet
- August 29 – Robin Hyde (Iris Guiver Wilkinson) (born 1906), New Zealand poet and novelist, suicide

== See also ==
- Poetry
- List of poetry awards
- List of years in poetry
