= 1937 in poetry =

Nationality words link to articles with information on the nation's poetry or literature (for instance, Irish or France).

== Events ==
- February 1 – First broadcast on Sveriges Radio (Sweden) of the continuing programme Dagens dikt ("Poem of the day").
- Summer – In Nazi Germany, Wolfgang Willrich, a member of the SS, lampoons German expressionist poet Gottfried Benn in his book Säuberung des Kunsttempels; Heinrich Himmler, however, steps in to reprimand Willrich and defends Benn on the grounds of his pro-Nazi record since 1933 (his earlier artistic output being dismissed as irrelevant).
- Iowa Writers' Workshop is founded by Paul Engle at the University of Iowa
- George Hill Dillon becomes editor of Poetry Magazine, remaining in that post until 1949.
- Poems of colonial American pastor Edward Taylor (d. 1729) are first discovered and published.
- W. B. Yeats concludes his recordings of his own verse and his broadcast lectures on the BBC (begun in 1936).

== Works published in English ==
=== Canada ===
- Wilson MacDonald, Comber Cove. Toronto: S.J.R. Saunders.
- E. J. Pratt, The Fable of the Goats and Other Poems, Toronto: Macmillan. Governor General's Award 1937.

=== India, in English ===
- Harindranath Chattopadhyaya, Strange Journey ( Poetry in English ), Madras: Shakti Karyalayam
- P. R. Kaikini, This Civilization ( Poetry in English ), Bombay: New Book Co.
- Iqbal Ali Shah, editor, The Coronation Book of Oriental Literature ( Poetry in English ), London: Sampson Low, Marston and Co., 404 pages; anthology; Indian poetry published in the United Kingdom

=== United Kingdom ===
- W. H. Auden, Spain
- W. H. Auden and Louis MacNeice, Letters from Iceland, partly poetry
- George Barker, Calamiterror
- John Betjeman, Continual Dew: A little book of bourgeois verse, including "The Arrest of Oscar Wilde at the Cadogan Hotel"
- Edmund Blunden, A Ballad of Titles, An elegy, and other poems and Uneasy Quiet
- Walter de la Mare, This Year, Next Year, illustrations by Harold Jones, Faber
- David Jones, In Parenthesis, frontispiece by author, Faber
- Charles Madge, The Disappearing Castle
- Edwin Muir, Journeys and Places
- Enoch Powell, First Poems, Oxford: Blackwell
- Isaac Rosenberg, Collected Works, foreword by Siegfried Sassoon; posthumously published
- Iqbal Ali Shah, editor, The Coronation Book of Oriental Literature, London: Sampson Low, Marston and Co., 404 pages; anthology; Indian poetry in English, published in the United Kingdom
- Stevie Smith, A Good Time Was Had By All

=== United States ===
- W. H. Auden, with Louis MacNeice, Letters from Iceland
- R. P. Blackmur, From Jordan's Delight
- Louise Bogan, the Sleeping Fury
- Richard Eberhart, Reading the Spirit
- Robert Hillyer, A Letter to Robert Frost and Others
- Robinson Jeffers, Such Counsels You Gave to Me
- Josephine Johnson, Year's End
- Edna St. Vincent Millay, Conversation at Midnight
- Ezra Pound, The Fifth Decad of Cantos
- May Sarton, Encounter in April
- Dr. Seuss, And to Think That I Saw It on Mulberry Street, the author's first book; for children
- Wallace Stevens, The Man with the Blue Guitar, and Other Poems, includes "The Man With the Blue Guitar," "A Thought Revolved," and "The Men That Are Falling", Knopf
- Allen Tate, Selected Poems

=== Other in English ===
- Allen Curnow, Enemies: Poems 1934–36 (Caxton), New Zealand
- Robin Hyde, Wednesday's Children, New Zealand
- Seaforth Mackenzie, Our Earth, Sydney: Angus and Robertson; Australia

== Works published in French ==
=== Canada ===
- Hector de Saint-Denys Garneau, Regards et jeux dans l'espace

=== France ===
- Jacques Audiberti, Race des hommes
- Rene-Guy Cadou, Les Brancardiers de l'aube, the author's first book of poems, published when he was 17 years old
- Pierre Jean Jouve, Matière celeste
- Max Jacob, Morceaux choisis
- Oscar Vladislas de Lubicz-Milosz, also known as O. V. de L. Milosz, Dix-sept Poèmes de Milosz
- Henri Michaux, Plume, précédé de Lointain intérieur
- Pierre Reverdy, Ferraille
- Philippe Soupault, Poésies Complètes 1917–1973

== Works published in other languages ==
=== Indian subcontinent ===
Including all of the British colonies that later became India, Pakistan, Bangladesh, Sri Lanka and Nepal. Listed alphabetically by first name, regardless of surname:

==== Bengali ====
- Mallavarapu Visveswara Rao, Madukila, notable for its style, sentiments and various metrics
- Rabindranath Tagore:
  - Khapchada, short, humorous and frivolous poems in the style of nursery rhymes
  - Chadar Chabi
- Samar Sen, Kayekti Kabita, Indian, Bengali-language
- Sudhindranath Dutta, Krandasi

==== Telugu ====
- Gangula Sayi Reddi, Kapu bidda, poems on the condition of farmers; Telugu
- Gurram Jashuva, editor, Khanda Kavyamu or Jashuva Khandakavyalu, in seven volumes, published from this year to 1949; anthology of Telagu poetry
- Peer Aziz Ullah Haqqani, Qissa-e-Mumtaz E Benazir, a large masnavi of Romantic mysticism; Telugu; posthumous
- Srirangam arayanababu, Rudhirajyoti, Telugu
- Vedula Satyanarayan Shastri, Dipavali, romantic lyrics, Telugu

==== Urdu ====
- Mehr Lal Soni Zia Fatehabadi Noor-e-Mashriq (The Light of the East) - Collection of nazms, geets and sonnets published by Jyoti Prasad Gupta, Jyoti Printing Works, Esplanade, Delhi in 1937.

==== Other Indian languages ====
- Anupa Sharma, Siddharth, a Hindi epic in 18 chapters on the story of Gautama Buddha
- D. R. Bendre, also known as Ambikatanaya Datta, Sakhigita, the title poem is autobiographical; Kannada
- Devandas Kishinani, 'Purab Sandes, Indian, Sindhi-language
- Ghulam Mohammad Hanafi, Jang-e Amir Hamza, a Jangnama, based on an episode in the movement to spread Islam; Kashmiri
- Hijam Anganhal Simha, Singel Indu, a long narrative Meitei poem
- Manjewshwara Govinda Pai, Golgotha, long narrative poem on the final days of Jesus Christ, Kannada
- Riddhinath Jha, Pravasi Mithiles, verses praising the Maharaja of Darbhanga; Maithili
- Siyaramsharan Gupta, Bapu, on Gandhi and his ideology, Hindi

=== Spanish language ===
==== Peru ====
- Xavier Abril, Descubrimiento del alba
- José Santos Chocano, Poemas de amor doliente, Peru
- Manuel Moreno Jimeno, Así bajaron los perros
- Luis Fabio Xammar, Waino

==== Other in Spanish ====
- Miguel Hernández, Viento del pueblo; Spain

=== Other ===
- Amir Hamzah, Nyanyi Sunyi, Dutch East Indies

== Awards and honors ==
- Queen's Gold Medal for Poetry: W. H. Auden
- Consultant in Poetry to the Library of Congress (the post which was later called "Poet Laureate Consultant in Poetry to the Library of Congress"): Joseph Auslander appointed this year (he would serve until 1941)
- Fellowship of the Academy of American Poets: Edwin Markham
- Governor General's Award, poetry or drama: The Fable of the Goats, E. J. Pratt

== Births ==
Death years link to the corresponding "[year] in poetry" article:

- January 1:
  - John Fuller, English poet and author
  - Dilwar Khan (died 2013), Bengali poet
- January 14 – J. Bernlef, born Hendrik Jan Marsman (died 2012), Dutch poet, novelist and translator
- February 21 – Mervyn Morris, Jamaican poet
- February 27 – Peter Hamm (died 2019), German poet, author, journalist, editor and literary critic
- April 10 – Bella Akhmadulina (died 2010), Russian poet
- April 23 – Coleman Barks (died 2026), American poet who, although he neither spoke nor read Persian, is nonetheless renowned as a translator of Rumi and other mystic poets of Persia
- April 30 – Tony Harrison (died 2025), English poet and playwright
- May 11 – Michael Heller, American poet
- May 21 – Glen Sorestad, Canadian poet
- June 8 – Gillian Clarke, native Welsh, English-language poet, playwright, editor, broadcaster, lecturer and translator (from Welsh)
- June 10 – Susan Howe, American poet and critic closely associated with the Language poets
- July 3 – Milovan Danojlić, Serbian poet and essayist (died 2022)
- July 10 – Kurt Bartsch, German poet
- July 18 – Roald Hoffmann, born Safran, Polish-born American theoretical chemist, poet and playwright, recipient of the Nobel Prize in Chemistry
- July 29 – Eleanor Wilner, American poet and editor
- August 3
  - Marvin Bell (died 2020), American poet
  - Diane Wakoski, American poet associated with the "deep image" poets and the Beats
- September 14 – Douglas Oliver (died 2000), British poet
- October 11 – R. H. W. Dillard, American poet, author, critic and translator
- November 4 – W. Dabney Stuart, American poet
- November 9
  - Roger McGough, English poet
  - S. Abdul Rahman (died 2017), Tamil poet
- November 11 – Alicia Ostriker, American poet and academic
- November 19 – Meg Campbell (died 2007), New Zealand poet and wife of Alistair Campbell
- December 1 – Eugene B. Redmond, African-American poet
- December 23 – Vénus Khoury-Ghata, Lebanese-born French poet, novelist and beauty queen (died 2026)
- December 31 – Nicolas Born (died 1979), German poet
- Also:
  - Parijat, पारिजात, Bishnu Kumari Waiba (died 1993), Nepalese novelist and poet
  - John Riley (died 1978), English poet associated with the British Poetry Revival

== Deaths ==
Death years link to the corresponding "[year] in poetry" article:

- March 8 – Albert Verwey (born 1865), Dutch poet
- April 21 – Saima Harmaja, (born 1913), Finnish poet
- June 22 – Jean-Joseph Rabearivelo (born 1901?), Malagasy poet writing in French; suicide
- July 6 – Alex McDade (born 1905), Scottish poet and labourer; killed in the Spanish Civil War
- July 18 – Julian Bell (born 1908), English poet, and a member of a family whose notable members include his parents, Clive and Vanessa Bell; his aunt, Virginia Woolf; his younger brother, writer Quentin Bell; and his half-sister, writer and painter Angelica Garnett; killed in the Spanish Civil War
- August 11 – Edith Wharton (born 1862), American novelist, short story writer, designer and poet
- September 8 – Anna Hempstead Branch (born 1875), American poet
- October 22 – Chūya Nakahara 中原 中也 (born 1907), early Shōwa period Japanese poet (surname: Nakahara)
- December 26 – Ivor Gurney (born 1890), English composer and poet; tuberculosis while suffering delusional insanity
- December 29 – Don Marquis (born 1878), American poet, artist, newspaper columnist, humorist, playwright and author best known for creating the characters "Archy" and "Mehitabel"
- Also – Constance Woodrow (born 1899), English-born Canadian poet

== See also ==
- Poetry
- List of poetry awards
- List of years in poetry
