= W. Dabney Stuart =

American poet (born 1937)

- Born: Walker Dabney Stuart III; November 4, 1937 (age 89); Richmond, Virginia, U.S.
- Education: Davidson College (BA); Harvard University (MA)
- Occupation: Poet

Walker Dabney Stuart III (born November 4, 1937 Richmond, Virginia) is an American poet.

He graduated from Davidson College, with a BA in English in 1960, and from Harvard University, with an MA in English in 1962. Beginning his career at the College of William and Mary, he is professor emeritus of English at Washington and Lee University. His work appeared in Poetry, Shenandoah, Southern Review, and Yale Review.

== Awards ==
- 1987 Guggenheim Fellowship

== Works ==
=== Poetry ===
- Tables, Pinyon Publishing, 2009, ISBN 978-0-9821561-1-7
- Family Preserve: Poems, University of Virginia Press, 2005, ISBN 978-0-8139-2328-4
- The Man Who Loves Cézanne: Poems, LSU Press, 2003, ISBN 978-0-8071-2900-5
- Settlers: Poems, Louisiana State University Press, 1999, ISBN 978-0-8071-2406-2
- Long Gone: Poems, Louisiana State University Press, 1996, ISBN 978-0-8071-2121-4
- Light Years: New and Selected Poems, Louisiana State University Press, 1994, ISBN 978-0-8071-1898-6
- Narcissus Dreaming: Poems, Louisiana State University Press, 1990, ISBN 978-0-8071-1591-6
- Don't Look Back: Poems, Louisiana State University Press, 1987, ISBN 978-0-8071-1374-5
- Common Ground: Poems, Louisiana State University Press, 1982, ISBN 978-0-8071-1023-2
- Round and Round. A Triptych: Poems, Louisiana University Press, 1977, ISBN 978-0-8071-0271-8
- The Other Hand: Poems, Louisiana State University Press, 1974, ISBN 978-0-8071-0076-9
- A Particular Place: Poems, Knopf, 1969

=== Stories ===
- No Visible Means of Support: Stories, University of Missouri Press, 2001, ISBN 978-0-8262-1320-4
- The Way to Cobbs Creek: Stories, University of Missouri Press, 1997, ISBN 978-0-8262-1143-9

=== Criticism ===
- Nabokov: The Dimensions of Parody, Louisiana State University Press, 1978, ISBN 978-0-8071-0384-5
