= Jen Saunders =

Australian poet, painter and singer-musician

Jennifer May "Jen" Saunders (born 1962, Mittagong, New South Wales) is an Australian poet, painter and singer-musician. Her poetry has been published in two books, Translations (1999) and In a Night House (2002). In 2008, under the name, Venn, Saunders won an ABC Radio National Orpheus Remix Award for her musical composition, "There Aint but One Kind of Blues". In 2010, under the name vennsquidink, she released the electronica album 'nasty noises'. Saunders has contributed soundscapes to ABC Radio National, the Historic Houses Trust of NSW and Micro Galleries, Nowra. She has been exhibiting visual arts since the 1980s.

== Biography ==
Jennifer May Saunders was born in 1962 in the rural New South Wales town of Mittagong. She moved to Wagga Wagga in 1981 where she completed a Diploma in Applied Arts with a major in silversmithing. In 1984 she set up a jewellery-making workshop and exhibited at the Old Brewery Gallery in Wagga Wagga. Since 1987 Saunders has regularly exhibited paintings, drawings and collages in mixed shows in Sydney, Melbourne, the Southern Highlands and the Shoalhaven where she now lives.

In 1992, Saunders began performing her poetry at writer's nights in the Shoalhaven and Illawarra. She has performed poetry at festivals and events regularly since then. She established and produced the literary magazine "Squidink" in 2000

In 1999, she published her first book of poetry Translations (Passionfruit Press, Broughton Creek, 1999) and in May 2002, launched In a Night House (PressPress, Berry, 2002).

Saunders is also a songwriter/musician performing regularly in a variety of bands as well as solo. In 2008, under the name, Venn, Saunders won an Orpheus Remix Award for "There Aint but One Kind of Blues". In September 2009, her new work, "Hidden Beak Funeral Bird", was commissioned for and performed on Australian Broadcasting Corporation's radio programme New Music Up Late.

In 2013, in alliance with Renew Australia and Stockland Nowra, Saunders set up the grass roots gallery space Squid Studio.

== Works ==
=== Poetry ===
- Saunders, Jen (1999). Translations. Berry, New South Wales: Passionfruit Press. ISBN 0-9586425-0-8.
- Saunders, Jen (2002). In a Night House. Berry, NSW: PressPress. ISBN 0-9580367-3-X.
