= Marie Joussaye =

Canadian poet

- Born: Marie Josie; 1864; Belleville, Canada West
- Died: 1949 (aged 84–85); Vancouver
- Occupation: journalist
- Spouse: David Heatherington Fotheringham
- Writing career
- Genre: poetry

Marie Joussaye (1864 in Belleville – 24 March 1949 in Vancouver) was a Canadian poet.

== Life ==
Marie Josie was born at and grew up in Belleville Canada West. She was a newspaper journalist in Toronto. In 1893, she was president of the Working Girls' Union. She moved to Dawson City, Yukon. In November 1903, she married David Heatherington Fotheringham, a Northwest Mounted Policeman. They had financial difficulties. In 1924, she moved to Mayo, Yukon. In 1929, she moved to Vancouver, where she died in a rooming house on 24 March 1949.

== Works ==
- The Songs that Quinte Sang (1895)
- Selections from Anglo-Saxon Songs (1918)

== Sources ==
- Carole Gerson, "Only a Working Girl: The Story of Marie Joussaye Fotheringham," Northern Review 19 (Winter 1998)
