= Richard Hillman (poet) =

Australian poet and environmentalist

Richard Hillman (born 16 March 1964 in Liverpool, New South Wales) is an Australian poet.

He has published a number of collections, and was a founding editor of the poetry and poetics journal Sidewalk (1997). His "The Big Wet Takes Hold" (2004) and "The Night Parrot" (2006) were selected among the best Australian poems. In 2001, he was a doctoral student at Flinders University.

== Works ==
- Mending The Dingo Fence (Adelaide: Wakefield Press, 1997)
- Gone Up River (Adelaide: SideWaLK, 1999)
- No Grounds (Adelaide: SideWaLK/Subverse, 2000)
- Flow: Friendly Street Poetry Reader 25 (co-edited with Heather Sladdin, Adelaide: Wakefield Press, 2001).
- Jabiluka Honey: New & Selected Poems (Adelaide: Bookends Books, 2003)
- Timber Country (Warners Bay, NSW: Picaro Press, 2007)
- Raw Nerve (Glebe, NSW: Puncher & Wattmann Press, 2009)
