= 1895 in poetry =

This article covers 1895 in poetry. Nationality words link to articles with information on the nation's poetry or literature (for instance, Irish or France).

O beautiful for pilgrim feet
Whose stern impassion'd stress
A thoroughfare for freedom beat
Across the wilderness.

America! America!
God mend thine ev'ry flaw,
Confirm thy soul in self-control,
Thy liberty in law.

-- Lines 9–16, "Pikes Peak", the original name of Katharine Lee Bates' poem, first published on July 4 and later set to music and known as "America the Beautiful"

== Events ==
=== Oscar Wilde's arrest and conviction ===
- February 18 – John Douglas, 9th Marquess of Queensberry (father of Lord Alfred Douglas, Oscar Wilde's lover), leaves his calling card at the Albemarle Club in London, inscribed: "For Oscar Wilde, posing somdomite", i.e. a sodomite, inducing Wilde to charge him with criminal libel.
- April 3–5 – Libel case of Wilde v Queensberry at the Old Bailey in London: Queensberry is acquitted. Evidence of Wilde's homosexual relationships with young men renders him liable to criminal prosecution under the Labouchere Amendment, while the Libel Act 1843 renders him legally liable for the considerable expenses Queensberry has incurred in his defence, leaving Wilde penniless.
- April 6 – Wilde is arrested at the Cadogan Hotel, London, for "unlawfully committing acts of gross indecency with certain male persons" and detained on remand in Holloway Prison.
- May 25 – Criminal case of Regina v. Wilde: After a retrial at the Old Bailey, Wilde is convicted of gross indecency and is taken to Pentonville Prison to begin his two years' sentence of hard labour.
- November 21 – Wilde is transferred to Reading Gaol.

=== Other events ===
- December 19 – Robert Frost marries Elinor Miriam White at Lawrence, Massachusetts.
- Rudyard Kipling writes the poem If—.
- Ernest Thayer recites Casey at the Bat at a Harvard class reunion, resolving the "mystery" of the poem's authorship.

== Works published in English ==
=== Canada ===
- Bliss Carman, A Seamark: A Threnody for Robert Louis Stevenson. Boston: Copeland & Day.
- Bliss Carman, Behind The Arras: A Book Of The Unseen. Illus. Tom B. Meteyard. Boston: Lamson, Wolffe.
- Sophia Almon Hensley, A Woman's Love Letters.
- Emily Pauline Johnson, The White Wampum, Toronto: Copp Clark; London: John Lane.
- Marie Joussaye, Songs that Quinte Sang.
- Archibald Lampman, Lyrics of Earth
- Arthur Stringer, Pauline and Other Poems.
- Agnes Ethelwyn Wetherald, The House of the Trees and Other Poems

=== United Kingdom ===
- Robert Bridges, Invocation to Music
- Gelett Burgess, "The Purple Cow"
- John Davidson, Fleet Street Eclogues, second series (first series, 1893)
- Austin Dobson, The Story of Rosina, and Other Verses
- Maurice Hewlett, A Masque of Dead Florentines
- Lionel Johnson, Poems
- William Morris, The Tale of Beowulf
- Coventry Patmore, The Rod, the Root, and the Flower
- Arthur Quiller-Couch, editor, The Golden Pomp, anthology of 16th- and 17th-century English lyricists
- Arthur Symons, London Nights
- James Thomson, Poetical Works, posthumously published; edited, with a memoir, by Bertram Dobell
- William Watson, The Father of the Forest, and Other Poems
- William Butler Yeats, Irish poet published in the United Kingdom:
  - Editor, A Book of Irish Verse, anthology
  - Poems, drama and poetry

=== United States ===
- Thomas Bailey Aldrich, Unguarded Gates
- Katharine Lee Bates, "Pikes Peak" a poem later set to music and becoming known as "America the Beautiful", originally published in the July 4 edition of The Congregationalist, a church periodical
- Orelia Key Bell, Poems
- Ina Coolbrith, Songs from the Golden Gate
- Stephen Crane, The Black Riders and Other Lines
- Paul Laurence Dunbar, Majors and Minors, including "We Wear the Mask"
- William Dean Howells, Stops of Various Quills
- James Russell Lowell, Last Poems, published posthumously
- James Whitcomb Riley, "Little Orphant Annie"
- Henry David Thoreau, Poems of Nature, published posthumously (died 1862)

=== Other in English ===
- Sri Aurobindo, Song to Myrtilla, Calcutta: Arya Publishing House; India, Indian poetry in English
- Banjo Paterson, The Man from Snowy River and Other Verses, major single-author collection of Australian bush poetry
- William Butler Yeats, Irish poet published in the United Kingdom:
  - Editor, A Book of Irish Verse, anthology
  - Poems, drama and poetry

== Works published in other languages ==
- José Santos Chocano, Peru:
  - En la aldea ("In the Village")
  - Iras santas
- Francis Jammes, Un jour, France
- Catulle Mendès, La Grive des vignes, France
- Władysław Mickiewicz, Vie d'Adam Mickiewicz ("Life of Adam Mickiewicz"), four volumes, Poznań, Poland, published beginning 1890 through this year; published by the poet's son
- K. C. Kesava Pillai, Asanna-Marana Chinta Satakam, lyric in the form of a monologue of a man about to die, Indian, Malayalam-language
- Émile Verhaeren, Les villes tentaculaires ("The tentacular towns"), Belgium, French language
- Verner von Heidenstam, Dikter ("Poems"), Sweden
- Manilal Dwivedi, Atmanimajjan, a collection of Gujarati language poems.

== Births ==
Death years link to the corresponding "[year] in poetry" article:

- January 21 – Davíð Stefánsson, (died 1964), Icelandic poet
- February 18 – Lazarus Aaronson (died 1966), English poet and academic economist
- April 18 – W. E. Harney (died 1962), Australian
- May 2 – Lorenz Hart (died 1943), American lyricist
- May 19 – Charles Hamilton Sorley (died 1915), Scots poet
- May 28 – Gamel Woolsey, born Elizabeth (Elsa) Gammell Woolsey (died 1968 in Spain), American poet and writer
- June 3 – Robert Hillyer (died 1961), American poet and academic
- July 22 – León de Greiff (died 1976), Colombian poet
- July 24 – Robert Graves (died 1985), English poet, translator and novelist
- September 10 – Viswanatha Satyanarayana (died 1976), Indian poet writing in Telugu; popularly known as the Kavi Samraat ("Emperor of Poetry")
- September 22 – Babette Deutsch (died 1982), American poet, critic, translator and novelist
- September 28 – Edward Harrington (died 1966), Australian poet, writer of Bush ballads
- November 1 – David Jones, born Walter David Michael Jones (died 1974), English (Welsh-descended) artist and poet
- November 15 – Antoni Słonimski (died 1976), Polish poet and writer
- November 25 – Helen Hooven Santmyer died 1986), American poet and author
- December 14 – Paul Éluard (died 1952), French poet, a founder of Surrealism
- December 23 – Lilian Bowes Lyon (died 1949), English poet, a cousin of Queen Elizabeth The Queen Mother
- Unknown dates
  - Padmadhar Chaliha (died 1969), Indian, Assamese-language poet
  - Max Dunn (died 1963), Irish-born Australian
  - Khavirakpan (died 1950), Indian, Meitei language poet

== Deaths ==
Birth years link to the corresponding "[year] in poetry" article:

- April 17 – Jorge Isaacs (born 1837), Colombian writer, politician and explorer
- May 30 – Frederick Locker-Lampson (born 1821), English writer and poet
- June 29 – Thomas Henry Huxley (born 1825), English controversialist, academic, scientist and occasional poet
- October 7 – William Wetmore Story (born 1819), American sculptor, art critic, poet and editor
- October 12 – Cecil Frances Alexander (born 1818), Irish hymn-writer and poet
- October 21 – Louisa Anne Meredith (born 1812), Australian
- November 4 – Eugene Field (born 1850), American writer best known for children's poetry and humorous essays
- November 22 – John Warren, 3rd Baron de Tabley (born 1835), English
- November 28 – Louisa Sarah Bevington (born 1845), English poet and anarchist

== See also ==
- 19th century in poetry
- 19th century in literature
- List of years in poetry
- List of years in literature
- Victorian literature
- French literature of the 19th century
- Symbolist poetry
- Young Poland (Młoda Polska) a modernist period in Polish arts and literature, roughly from 1890 to 1918
- Poetry
