= Bel Schenk =

Australian poet resident in Melbourne (born 1975)

Bel Schenk (born 1975) is an Australian poet and author resident in Melbourne. She has performed her work widely in venues around Australia.

Schenk was born in Adelaide, South Australia.

She is the author of The Most Famous Boy In Town (2024), Every Time You Close Your Eyes (2014), Ambulances & Dreamers (2008) and Urban Squeeze.

From 2008 to 2011 Schenk was employed as the artistic director of Express Media in Melbourne, and worked for many years prior to that at the SA Writers' Centre.

== Selected works ==
- Urban Squeeze (2003) ISBN 1-74027-189-0
- Ambulances & Dreamers (2008) ISBN 978-1-86254-818-3
- Every Time You Close Your Eyes (2014) ISBN 978-1-74305-319-5
- The Most Famous Boy In Town (2024) ISBN 978-0-6483988-2-0
