= 2010 in poetry =

Nationality words link to articles with information on the nation's poetry or literature (for instance, Irish or France).

== Events ==
- January 19 – For the first time since 1949, an anonymous black-clad man, known as the Poe Toaster, failed to show up at the tomb of Edgar Allan Poe at the Westminster Hall and Burying Ground, early on the morning of Poe's birthday. The absence of the man, who would toast Poe with Cognac and leave three red roses at the grave (along with the rest of the Cognac), disappointed more than 30 people who stayed up all night to be present at the appearance.
- March 27 – The Mezzo Cammin Women Poets Timeline Project, designed to become the largest database of women poets in the world, was launched in Washington, D.C., at the National Museum of Women in the Arts. The database will feature biographical information about female poets, as well as photos of them and, when possible, reprints of their work.
- April 12 – Rae Armantrout wins the Pulitzer Prize in Poetry for her collection Versed. "Having also won the National Book Critics Circle Award, after being named a finalist for the National Book Award, Armantrout is only the third poet to win two out of the three awards in one year."
- May 1 – David Biespiel, writing in Poetry, suggests (in an essay titled "This Land Is Our Land") that the insularity of America's poets has left them with a minimal presence in American civic discourse and a minuscule public role in the life of American democracy.
- November 26 – Japanese government honors Canadian poet Joy Kogawa with the Order of the Rising Sun "for her contribution to the understanding and preservation of Japanese Canadian history."

== Works published in English ==
Listed by nation where the work was first published and again by the poet's native land, if different; substantially revised works listed separately:

=== Australia ===
- Grant Caldwell, glass clouds, Five Islands Press
- Les Murray, Taller When Prone, Black Inc., ISBN 978-1-86395-470-9
- Dorothy Porter, Love Poems, Black Inc., ISBN 978-1-86395-492-1
- Ron Pretty, Postcards From the Centre
- Thomas Shapcott, Parts of Us, University of Queensland Press
- John Tranter, Starlight: 150 Poems, University of Queensland Press

==== Anthologies in Australia ====
- Brook Emery & Victoria Haritos (eds.), Science Made Marvelous Series: Earthly Matters: Biology and Geology Poems, Potts Point NSW: The Poets Union Inc. ISBN 978-0-9805-4202-8
- Brook Emery & Victoria Haritos (eds.), Science Made Marvelous Series: Law and Impulse: Maths and Chemistry Poems, Potts Point NSW: The Poets Union Inc. ISBN 978-0-9805-4201-1
- Brook Emery, John L. Sheppard & Victoria Haritos (eds.), Science Made Marvelous Series: Holding Patterns: Physics and Engineering Poems, Potts Point NSW: The Poets Union Inc. ISBN 978-0-9578-5645-5
- Robert Adamson, editor, Best Australian Poems 2010, Black Inc., anthology with works by
- Ali Alizadeh,
- Chris Andrews,
- Meera Atkinson,
- Luke Beesley,
- Judith Beveridge,
- Judith Bishop,
- Ken Bolton,
- Peter Boyle,
- Michael Brennan,
- David Brooks,
- Jen Jewel Brown,
- Pam Brown,
- Allison Browning,
- Joanne Burns,
- Elizabeth Campbell,
- Bonny Cassidy,
- Eileen Chong,
- Justin Clemens,
- Stuart Cooke,
- Nathan Curnow,
- Luke Davies,
- Bruce Dawe,
- Tricia Dearborn,
- B. R. Dionysius,
- Lucy Dougan,
- Laurie Duggan,
- Will Eaves,
- Ali Cobby Eckermann,
- Stephen Edgar,
- Chris Edwards,
- Anne Elvey,
- Brook Emery,
- Kate Fagan,
- Mike Farrell,
- Susan Fealy,
- Liam Ferney,
- S.J. Finn,
- Lionel Fogarty,
- Adam Ford,
- Adam Formosa,
- Angela Gardner,
- Claire Gaskin,
- Jane Gibian,
- Keri Glastonbury,
- Lisa Gorton,
- Robert Gray,
- Martin Harrison,
- Kevin Hart,
- Matt Hetherington,
- Barry Hill,
- Sarah Holland Batt,
- L. K. Holt,
- Duncan Hose,
- Lisa Jacobson,
- Carol Jenkins,
- A. Frances Johnson,
- Jill Jones,
- Frank Kellaway,
- Peter Kenneally,
- Graeme Kinross-Smith,
- John Kinsella,
- Andy Kissane,
- Anna Krien,
- Mike Ladd,
- Martin Langford,
- Anthony Lawrence,
- Michelle Leber,
- Geoffrey Lehmann,
- Kate Lilley,
- Debbie Lim,
- Astrid Lorange,
- Cameron Lowe,
- Roberta Lowing,
- Anthony Lynch,
- Jennifer Maiden,
- Rhyll McMaster,
- Kate Middleton,
- Peter Minter,
- Anne Morgan,
- Derek Motion,
- Les Murray,
- Jenni Nixon,
- Nguyen Tien Hoang,
- Geoff Page,
- Pi.0,
- Claire Potter,
- Peter Rose,
- Josephine Rowe,
- Robyn Rowland,
- Brendan Ryan,
- Gig Ryan,
- Thomas Shapcott,
- Craig Sherborn,
- Vivian Smith,
- Peter Steele,
- James Stuart,
- Maria Takolander,
- Hugh Tolhurst,
- John Tranter,
- Mark Tredinnick,
- Louise Wakeling,
- Chris Wallace-Crabbe,
- Meredith Wattison,
- Petra White,
- Chloe Wilson,
- Ouyang Yu

=== Canada ===
- Shane Book, Ceiling of Sticks
- Anne Carson, Nox, New Directions, described by one reviewer as "not really a 'book' at all, but rather a box of material connected accordion-style (in one folded, ribbon-like page many yards long) about the death of her deeply troubled older brother Michael" and including a translation of Catullus 101; Canadian published in the United States
- Jen Currin, The Inquisition Yours, Toronto: Coach House Press, ISBN 978-1-55245-230-1
- Joe Denham, Windstorm
- Kevin McPherson Eckhoff, Rhapsodomancy, Toronto: Coach House Press, ISBN 978-1-55245-231-8
- Kenneth Leslie, The Essential Kenneth Leslie. [Ed. Zachariah Wells] Erin, Ontario: Porcupine's Quill, 2010. ISBN 0-88984-328-7, ISBN 978-0-88984-328-8
- A. F. Moritz, editor, The Griffin Poetry Prize Anthology 2010, work by the winners of the Griffin Poetry Prize, House of Anansi Press, 112 pages, ISBN 978-0-88784-955-8
- Garry Thomas Morse, After Jack
- James Reaney, A Suit of Nettles. Porcupine's Quill.
- Lisa Robertson, R's Boat, 96 pages, "New California Poetry" series of the University of California Press, ISBN 978-0-520-26240-9, written by a Canadian poet living in and published in the United States
- Priscila Uppal, Successful Tragedies: Poems 1998–2010, Bloodaxe Books Ltd, 192 pages, ISBN 978-1-85224-860-4, Canadian author published in the United Kingdom

=== India, in English ===
- Arun Kamal, Naye Ilake Mein, translated from the original Hindi into English by Giriraj Kiradoo, New Delhi: Sahitya Akademi, India 2010.
- J. T. Jayasingh, editor, New Voices, anthology; Thiruvananthapuram: Roots and Wings
- Tabish Khair, Man of Glass ( Poetry in English )., New Delhi: HarperCollins, India 2010. ISBN 81-7223-979-3
- Kynpham Sing Nongkynrih and Robin Ngangom, editors, Dancing Earth: An Anthology of Poetry from North-East India
- Srinivas Sistla, Amuktamalyada, translated from the original Telugu of Krishna Deva Raya's classic epic; Visakhapatnam, Andhra Pradesh: Drusya Kala Deepika
- Meena Kandasamy, "Ms. Militancy", Chennai: Navayana, India 2010
- Anindita Sengupta, "City of Water" ( Poetry in English )., Bangalore: Sahitya Akademi, India 2010.

=== Ireland ===
- Anthony Cronin, The Fall, 120 pages, New Island Press, ISBN 978-1-84840-068-9
- Theo Dorgan, Greek, Dedalus Press, ISBN 978-1-906614-17-1
- Seamus Heaney, Human Chain, 85 pages, Faber & Faber
- Thomas Kilroy, Christ, Deliver Us, Oldcastle, County Meath: Gallery Press
- Alan Moore How Now! Anvil Press Poetry, ISBN 978-0-85646-432-4
- Paul Muldoon, Maggot
- Micheal O'Siadhail, Tongue, Irish poet published in the United Kingdom, Bloodaxe Books

=== New Zealand ===
- Paula Green, Slip Stream, Auckland University Press
- Paula Green (editor), Dear Heart: 150 New Zealand Love Poems, Godwit
- Paula Green and Harry Ricketts, 99 Ways into New Zealand Poetry, Vintage
- Kate Camp, The Mirror of Simple Annihilated Souls, Victoria University Press
- Lynn Jenner, Dear Sweet Harry, Auckland University Press

==== Poets in Best New Zealand Poems ====
Poems from these 25 poets were selected by Robyn Marsack for Best New Zealand Poems 2009, published online this year:

- Tusiata Avia
- Sarah Broom
- Geoff Cochrane
- Jennifer Compton
- Lynn Davidson
- John Gallas
- Bernadette Hall
- David Howard
- Lynn Jenner
- Brent Kininmont
- Michele Leggott
- Emma Neale
- James Norcliffe
- Gregory O'Brien
- Chris Price
- Kerrin P. Sharpe
- Marty Smith
- Elizabeth Smither
- C. K. Stead
- Brian Turner
- Tim Upperton
- Louise Wallace
- Ian Wedde
- Douglas Wright
- Ashleigh Young

=== United Kingdom ===
- Fleur Adcock, Dragon Talk, Bloodaxe Books
- Jill Bialosky, The Skiers: Selected Poems, 144 pages, ISBN 978-1-904614-93-7
- Matthew Caley, Apparently, Bloodaxe Books
- Stewart Conn, The Breakfast Room, Bloodaxe Books
- Razmik Davoyan, Whispers and Breath of the Meadows, translated from the original Armenian by Armine Tamrazian, introduction by W. N. Herbert, 172 pages, ISBN 9781904614470
- Katie Donovan, Rootling, Bloodaxe Books
- Carol Ann Duffy, Love Poems, a selection, 84 pages, Picador, ISBN 978-0-330-51271-8
- Bernardine Evaristo & Daljit Nagra. editors, Ten: New poets from Spread the Word, an anthology, with work by Mir Mahfuz Ali, Rowyda Amin, Malika Booker, Roger Robinson, Karen McCarthy, Nick Makoha, Denise Saul, Seni Seniviratne, Shazea Quraishi and Janet Kofi Tsekpo; Bloodaxe Books
- Ruth Fainlight, New & Collected Poems, Bloodaxe Books
- Sylva Fischerová, The Swing in the Middle of Chaos, translated by Stuart Friebert and Sylva Fischerova from the original Czech; Bloodaxe Books
- Roy Fisher, Standard Midland, Bloodaxe Books
- Cheryl Follon, Dirty Looks, Bloodaxe Books
- Miriam Gamble, The Squirrels Are Dead, Bloodaxe Books
- Bill Griffiths, Collected Earlier Poems (1966–80), Reality Street, Sussex
- Seamus Heaney, Human Chain, Faber and Faber
- Tony Hoagland, Unincorporated Persons in the Late Honda Dynasty, Bloodaxe Books
- Ishion Hutchinson, Far District: Poems, Jamaican poet published in the United Kingdom, Peepal Tree Press
- Helen Ivory, The Breakfast Machine, Bloodaxe Books
- Arun Kolatkar, Collected Poems in English, edited by Arvind Krishna Mehrotra, Marathi- and English-language poet of India, published in the United Kingdom, Bloodaxe Books; posthumous (died 2004)
- Gwyneth Lewis, A Hospital Odyssey, Bloodaxe Books
- Kona Macphee, Perfect Blue, Bloodaxe Books
- Harry Martinson, Chickweed Wintergreen, translated from the original Swedish by Robin Fulton, Bloodaxe Books
- Grace Nichols, I Have Crossed an Ocean, Bloodaxe Books
- Micheal O'Siadhail, Tongue, Irish poet published in the United Kingdom, Bloodaxe Books
- Don Paterson, Rain, Faber & Faber
- Mario Petrucci, i tulips, Enitharmon Press, 112, pages, ISBN 978-1-904634-93-5
- Ralph Pordzik, Hotel Salvador Dali and Other Poems, Lulu Press, 49 pages, ISBN 978-1-4457-2224-5
- Peter Reading, Vendage Tardive, Bloodaxe Books
- Robin Robertson, The Wrecking Light, 112 pages, Picador, ISBN 978-0-330-51548-1
- Anna Robinson, The Finders of London, Enitharmon Press, 64, pages, ISBN 978-1-904634-94-2
- Lawrence Sail, Waking Dreams, Bloodaxe Books
- Penelope Shuttle, Sandgrain and Hourglass, Bloodaxe Books
- Louis Simpson, Voices in the Distance, Bloodaxe Books
- John Stammers, Interior Night, Picador, 64 pages, ISBN 978-0-330-51338-8
- Pia Tafdrup, Tarkovsky's Horses and other poems, translated by David McDuff from the original Danish; Bloodaxe Books
- Marina Tsvetaeva, Art in the Light of Conscience, translated by Angela Livingstone from the original Russian; Bloodaxe Books
- Brian Turner, Phantom Noise, Bloodaxe Books
- Chase Twichell, Horses Where the Answers Should Have Been, Bloodaxe Books
- Priscila Uppal, Successful Tragedies: Poems 1998–2010, Bloodaxe Books Ltd, 192 pages, ISBN 978-1-85224-860-4, Canadian author published in the United Kingdom

==== Anthologies in the United Kingdom ====
- Anthony Astbury, editor, A Field of Large Desires: A Greville Press Anthology 1975–2010, Carcanet Press, ISBN 978-1-84777-050-9
- Roddy Lumsden, editor, Identity Parade: New British & Irish Poets, anthology; Bloodaxe Books

Poets included: Patience Agbabi, Jonathan Asser, Tiffany Atkinson, Simon Barraclough, Paul Batchelor, Kate Bingham, Julia Bird, Patrick Brandon, David Briggs, Andy Brown, Judy Brown, Colette Bryce, Matthew Caley, Siobhan Campbell, Vahni Capildeo, Melanie Challenger, Kate Clanchy, Polly Clark, Julia Copus, Sarah Corbett, Claire Crowther, Tim Cumming, Ailbhe Darcy, Peter Davidson, Nick Drake, Sasha Dugdale, Chris Emery, Bernardine Evaristo, Paul Farley, Leontia Flynn, Annie Freud, Alan Gillis, Jane Griffiths, Vona Groarke, Jen Hadfield, Sophie Hannah, Tracey Herd, Kevin Higgins, Matthew Hollis, A. B. Jackson, Anthony Joseph, Luke Kennard, Nick Laird, Sarah Law, Frances Leviston, Gwyneth Lewis, John McAuliffe, Chris McCabe, Helen Macdonald, Patrick McGuinness, Kona Macphee, Peter Manson, D. S. Marriott, Sam Meekings, Sinéad Morrissey, Daljit Nagra, Caitríona O'Reilly, Alice Oswald, Katherine Pierpoint, Clare Pollard, Jacob Polley, Diana Pooley, Richard Price, Sally Read, Deryn Rees-Jones, Neil Rollinson, Jacob Sam-La Rose, Antony Rowland, James Sheard, Zoë Skoulding, Catherine Smith, Jean Sprackland, John Stammers, Greta Stoddart, Sandra Tappenden, Tim Turnbull, Julian Turner, Mark Waldron, Ahren Warner, Tim Wells, Matthew Welton, David Wheatley, Sam Willetts, Samantha Wynne-Rhydderch, Tamar Yoseloff.

- George Szirtes, New Order: Hungarian Poets of the Post 1989 Generation, 300 pages, ISBN 978-1-906570-50-7

==== Criticism, scholarship and biography in the United Kingdom ====
- Ruth Padel, Silent Letters of the Alphabet, series of public lectures at Newcastle University, Bloodaxe Books
- George Szirtes, Fortinbras at the Fishhouses, series of public lectures at Newcastle University, Bloodaxe Books

=== United States ===
- Renée Ashley, The Verbs of Desiring
- Nicky Beer, The Diminishing House, 77 pages, Carnegie Mellon University Press, ISBN 978-0-88748-516-9
- Millicent Borges Accardi, Injuring Eternity, 108 pages, World Nouveau Press, ISBN 978-0-9828865-4-0
- Elizabeth Bradfield, Approaching Ice: Poems, 112 pages, Persea, ISBN 978-0-89255-355-6
- Charles Bernstein, All the Whiskey in Heaven: Selected Poems of Charles Bernstein, Farrar, Straus & Giroux, ISBN 978-0-374-10344-6
- Nicole Brossard, Selections, introduction by Jennifer Moxley, translations by many hands, University of California Press, Berkeley
- Julie Carr, 100 Notes on Violence, Ahsahta Press, Boise, ID
- Anne Carson, Nox, New Directions, described by one reviewer as "not really a 'book' at all, but rather a box of material connected accordion-style (in one folded, ribbon-like page many yards long) about the death of her deeply troubled older brother Michael" and including a translation of Catullus 101; Canadian published in the United States
- Billy Collins, Ballistics: Poems, 128 pages, Random House, ISBN 978-0-8129-7561-1
- Bei Dao, author, and Eliot Weinberger, translator and editor, The Rose of Time: New and Selected Poems, a bilingual English/Chinese edition of poems written in Chinese by Bei Dao; preface by Bei Dao, afterword by Eliot Weinberger; 304 pages; New Directions, ISBN 978-0-8112-1848-1
- Todd F. Davis, The Least of These: Poems, 140 pages, Michigan State University Press, ISBN 978-0-87013-875-1
- Camille Dungy, Suck on the Marrow, 88 pages, Red Hen Press, ISBN 978-1-59709-468-9
- Rachel Blau DuPlessis, Pitch: Drafts 77 – 95, Salt Publishing, London
- Larry Eigner, The Collected Poems of Larry Eigner, edited by Curtis Faville and Robert Grenier, Stanford University Press, Palo Alto, 2010, (Vol. I: 1937–1958; Vol. II: 1958–1966; Vol. III: 1966–1978; Vol. IV: 1978–1995); ISBN 978-0-8047-5090-5
- Aaron Fagan, Echo Train, Salt Publishing, London, ISBN 978-1-84471-749-1
- Elyse Fenton, Clamor, Cleveland State University Poetry Center, Cleveland, OH
- Musharraf Ali Farooqi, translator, Rococo and Other Worlds: Selected Poems, translation from the original Urdu of Afzal Ahmed Syed, 120 pages, Wesleyan University Press, ISBN 978-0-8195-6933-2
- Nada Gordon, Scented Rushes, Roof Books,
- Nathalie Handal, Love and Strange Horses, 91 pages; University of Pittsburgh Press
- Megan Harlan, Mapmaking, BkMk Press, ISBN 978-1-886157-77-4
- Robert Hass, The Apple Trees at Olema: New and Selected Poems, Ecco Press, ISBN 0-06-192382-6
- Terrance Hayes, Lighthead, Penguin, New York / London
- Tony Hoagland, Unincorporated Persons in the Late Honda Dynasty: Poems, the author's first collection in seven years, 100 pages, Graywolf Press, ISBN 978-1-55597-549-4
- Brenda Iijima, If Not Metaphoric, Ahsahta Press, Boise, ID
- Carrie Jerrell, After the Revival, 80 pages, Waywiser Press, ISBN 978-1-904130-38-3
- Andrew Joron, Trance Archive: New and Selected Poems, City Lights, San Francisco
- Reb Livingston, God Damsel, No Tell Books, Reston VA
- Ben Lerner, Mean Free Path, Copper Canyon Press, Port Townsend, WA ISBN 978-1-55659-314-7
- Shane McCrae, Mule, Cleveland State University Poetry Center, Cleveland, OH
- Mark McMorris, Entrepôt, 90 pages, Coffee House Press, ISBN 978-1-56689-236-0
- John McNeeley, 39, 260 pages, CreateSpace, ISBN 978-1-4499-9779-3
- Deborah Meadows, Depleted Burden Down, Factory School, Queens, NY
- Erika Meitner, Ideal Cities, 86 pages; Harper Perennial
- Simone Muench, Orange Crush: Poems, 88 pages, Sarabande Books, ISBN 978-1-932511-79-6
- Sawako Nakayasu, Texture Notes, Letter Machine Editions, Chicago / Denver
- Travis Nichols, Iowa, Letter Machine Editions, Chicago / Denver
- Tamae K. Prindle, translator, On Knowing Oneself Too Well: Selected Poems of Ishikawa Takuboku, translated from the original Japanese of the tanka poems written until the author's death in 1912 at age 26, 146 pages, Syllabic Press, ISBN 978-0-615-34562-8
- Barbara Ras, The Last Skin, Penguin, New York / London
- Adrienne Rich, Tonight No Poetry Will Serve: Poems 2007–2010, ISBN 0-393-07967-8.
- Atsuro Riley, Romey's Order, 54 pages; University of Chicago Press
- Lisa Robertson, R's Boat, 96 pages, "New California Poetry" series of the University of California Press, ISBN 978-0-520-26240-9, written by a Canadian poet living in and published in the United States
- Marc Rosen, James P. Wagner, coeditors and compilers, Perspectives: Poetry Concerning Autism and Other Disabilities, 178 pages, Local Gems Poetry Press, ISBN 978-0-557-57112-3
- R. M. Ryan, Vaudeville in the Dark, 68 pages; Louisiana State University Press
- Benjamin Alire Sáenz, The Book of What Remains, Copper Canyon, Port Townsend, WA
- Sonia Sanchez, Morning Haiku, 144 pages, Beacon Press, ISBN 978-0-8070-6910-3
- Sherod Santos, The Intricated Soul: New and Selected Poems, 164 pages, W. W. Norton & Company, ISBN 978-0-393-07216-7
- Leslie Scalapino, Floats Horse-Floats or Horse-Flows, Starcherone Books, ISBN 978-0-9788811-9-1
- Steven Seymour, translator, If There is Something to Desire: One Hundred Poems, translated from the original Russian of his wife, Vera Pavlova, 128 pages, Knopf, ISBN 978-0-307-27225-6
- Melissa Stein, Rough Honey, 98 pages; American Poetry Review
- Edwin Torres, In the Function of Extreme Circumstances, Nightboat Books, Callicoon, NY
- Nguyen Trai, Beyond the Court Gate: Selected Poems, edited & translated by Nguyen Do & Paul Hoover, Counterpath, Denver, 2010
- Frederick Goddard Tuckerman, Selected Poems, edited by Ben Mazer with an introduction by Stephen Burt, Belknap Press (Harvard University Press), Cambridge, MA
- Rosmarie Waldrop, Driven to Abstraction, New Directions, NY
- Connie Wanek, On Speaking Terms, Copper Canyon, Port Townsend, WA
- Karen Weiser, To Light Out, Ugly Duckling Presse, Brooklyn
- C.D. Wright, One With Others (Copper Canyon Press)
- Matthew Zapruder, Come On All You Ghosts, 111 pages; Copper Canyon Press

==== Anthologies in the United States ====
- David Fideler and Sabrineh Fideler, editors and translators, Love's Alchemy: Poems from the Sufi Tradition, 240 pages, New World Library, ISBN 978-1-57731-890-3
- David Groff and Philip Clark, Persistent Voices: Poetry by Writers Lost to AIDS, 240 pages, Alyson Books, ISBN 978-1-59350-153-2
- Naomi Shihab Nye, Time You Let Me In: 25 Poets under 25, for "young adults", 256 pages, Greenwillow Books, ISBN 978-0-06-189637-8
- Kevin Young, editor, The Art of Losing: Poems of Grief and Healing, 150 poems arranged to correspond with the grieving process, grouped by: Reckoning, Remembrance, Rituals, Recovery and Redemption; 336 pages, Bloomsbury USA, ISBN 978-1-60819-033-1

==== Criticism, scholarship and biography in the United States ====
- Robert Archambeau, Laureates and Heretics: Six Careers in American Poetry (Notre Dame, IN: University of Notre Dame Press) ISBN 978-0-268-02036-1
- David Biespiel, Every Writer Has a Thousand Faces (Kelson Books)
- Norma Cole, To Be At Music: Essays & Talks (Richmond, CA: Omnidawn Publishing) ISBN 978-1-890650-44-5
- Stephen Ratcliffe, Reading the Unseen: (Offstage) Hamlet (Denver, CO: Counterpath Press, 2010)

==== Poets in The Best American Poetry 2010 ====
These poets appeared in The Best American Poetry 2010, with David Lehman, general editor, and Amy Gerstler, guest editor (who selected the poetry):

- Dick Allen
- John Ashbery
- Sandra Beasley
- Mark Bibbins
- Todd Boss
- Fleda Brown
- Anne Carson
- Tom Clark
- David Clewell
- Michael Collier
- Billy Collins
- Dennis Cooper
- Kate Daniels
- Peter Davis
- Tim Dlugos
- Denise Duhamel
- Thomas Sayers Ellis
- Lynn Emanuel
- Elaine Equi
- Jill Alexander Essbaum
- B. H. Fairchild
- Vievee Francis
- Louise Glück
- Albert Goldbarth
- Amy Glynn Greacen
- Sonia Greenfield
- Kelle Groom
- Gabriel Gudding
- Kimiko Hahn
- Barbara Hamby
- Terrance Hayes
- Bob Hicok
- Rodney Jones
- Michaela Kahn
- Brigit Pegeen Kelly
- Corinne Lee
- Hailey Leithauser
- Dolly Lemke
- Maurice Manning
- Adrian Matejka
- Shane McCrae
- Jeffrey McDaniel
- W. S. Merwin
- Sarah Murphy
- Eileen Myles
- Camille Norton
- Alice Notley
- Sharon Olds
- Gregory Pardlo
- Lucia Perillo
- Carl Phillips
- Adrienne Rich
- James Richardson
- J. Allyn Rosser
- James Schuyler
- Tim Seibles
- David Shapiro
- Charles Simic
- Frank Stanford
- Gerald Stern
- Stephen Campbell Sutherland
- James Tate
- David Trinidad
- Chase Twichell
- John Updike
- Derek Walcott
- G.C. Waldrep
- J. E. Wei
- Dara Wier
- Terence Winch
- Catherine Wing
- Mark Wunderlich
- Matthew Yeager
- Dean Young
- Kevin Young

== Works Published by Language ==
=== Danish language ===
- Jöannes Nielsen, Broer af sultne ord ("Bridges of Hungry Words"), translated from the Faeroese by Erik Skyum-Nielsen, ISBN 978-87-92286-17-8, 52 pages
- Andrea Petri, Kulørte Balletfantasier ("Colored Ballet Fantasies"), ISBN 978-87-92467-65-2, 41 pages
- Allan Strandby Nielsen, Hvis der ikke er sandstorme, så er der nok noget andet ("If There Are Sandstorms, Then There Is Probably Something Else"), ISBN 978-87-02-09049-9, 88 pages

=== French language ===
==== France ====
- Marc Alyn, Anthologie poétique amoureuse, 330 pages, Ecriture, ISBN 978-2-909240-98-5
- Luc Bérimont, Poésies Complètes, publisher: Presses Universitaires d'Angers
- Abdellatif Laabi, Oeuvre poétique II, publisher: La Différence
- Yvon Le Men, Le Tour du monde en 80 poèmes, publisher: Flammarion
- Bernard Noël, Les Plumes d'éros ("The Feathers of Eros"), Works, Volume 1, poetry and prose, 448 pages, Galimard, ISBN 978-2-84682-349-4
- Sergio Badilla Castillo Ville Asiégée. Al Manar. Voix Vives de Méditerraée. Juillet 2010

===== Anthologies in France =====
- Marie-Claire Bancquart, editor, Couleurs femmes: Poèmes de 57 femmes, Le Castor Astral
- Christine Planté, editor, Femmes poètes du XIXe siècle: Une anthologie, PUL
- Erhan Turgut, editor, Voix de femmes. Anthologie de femmes poètes et photographes du monde, Turquoise Editions

=== Germany ===
- John Ashbery, Ein Weltgewandtes Land: Gedichte. Zweisprachig ("A Worldly Country: Poems"), a bilingual English/German edition; translated into German by Gerhard Falkner, Jan Wagner, Ron Winkler, Uljana Wolf et. a. 340 pages, Luxbooks, ISBN 978-3-939557-26-5
- Tadeusz Dabrowski, Schwarzes Quadrat auf schwarzem Grund. Zweisprachig a bilingual Polish/German edition; translated into German by Andre Rudolph, Monika Rinck, 140 pages, Luxbooks, ISBN 978-3-939557-94-4
- Rolf Haufs, Tanzstunde auf See: Gedichte, 128 pages, Hanser, ISBN 978-3-446-20678-6
- Martina Hefter, Nach den Diskotheken: Gedichte, 80 pages, Kookbooks, ISBN 978-3-937445-41-0
- Gert Jonke, Alle Gedichte: Gedichte ("Complete Poems"), 160 pages, Jung und Jung, ISBN 978-3-902497-65-9
- Nadja Küchenmeister, Alle Geister: Gedichte, 104 pages, Schöffling, ISBN 978-3-89561-225-1
- Ben Lerner, Die Lichtenbergfiguren: Gedichte. Zweisprachig ("The Lichtenberg Figures: Poems"), a bilingual English/German edition; translated into German by Steffen Popp, 70 pages, Luxbooks, ISBN 978-3-939557-42-5
- Gwendolyn McEwen Die T. E. Lawrence Gedichte: Gedichte. Zweisprachig, a bilingual English/German edition; translated into German by Christine Koschel, 160 pages, Edition Rugerup, ISBN 978-91-89034-26-6
- Benard Noel, Körperextrakte: Gedichte. Zweisprachig, a bilingual French/German edition; translated into German by Angela Sanmann, 106 pages, Das Wunderhorn, ISBN 978-3-88423-349-8
- Jörn Pfennig, Grondlos Zärtlich: Gedichte ("Unwarranted Tenderness: Poems"), 116 pages, Talberg, ISBN 978-3-9813473-0-2
- Marion Poschmann, Geistersehen: Gedichte ("Seeing Ghosts"), 126 pages, Suhrkamp, ISBN 978-3-518-42129-1
- Marcus Roloff, Im toten Winkel des goldenen Schnitts, 72 pages, Gutleut, ISBN 978-3-936826-49-4
- Doris Runge, Was da auftaucht: Gedichte, 84 pages, dtv, ISBN 978-3-421-04485-3
- Lutz Seiler, Felderlatein: Gedichte, 102 pages, Suhrkamp, ISBN 978-3-518-42169-7
- Ernest Wichner Bin ganz wie aufgesperrt, 47 pages, Das Wunderhorn, ISBN 978-3-88423-352-8
- Ron Winkler, Frenetische Stille: Gedichte ("Frenetic Silence: Poems"), 96 pages, Berlin Verlag, ISBN 978-3-8270-0920-3

=== Poland ===
- Jacek Gutorow, Na brzegu rzeki; publisher: Biuro Literackie
- Jiří Kolář, Sposób użycia i inne wiersze, selected, translated from the original Czech and annotated by Leszek Engelking; publisher: Oficyna Wydawnicza ATUT
- Urszula Kozioł, Horrendum; publisher: Wydawnictwo Literackie
- Ewa Lipska, Pogłos; publisher: Wydawnictwo Literackie
- Andrzej Sosnowski, Poems (untranslated title); publisher: Biuro Literackie
- Bohdan Zadura, Węgierskie lato. Przekłady z poetów węgierskich, translated from the original Hungarian; publisher: Biuro Literacke
- Adam Zagajewski, Wiersze wybrane (Selected Poems), publisher: Wydawnictwp a5

=== Spanish language ===
- Elvis Dino Esquivel, Llantos del silencio, Solar Empire Publishing, ISBN 978-0-61559-440-8
- Sergio Badilla Castillo Ok Atacama. Pentagrama edicions. Julio 2010, Santiago de Chile,

=== Other languages ===
- Bei Dao, author, and Eliot Weinberger, translator and editor, The Rose of Time: New and Selected Poems, a bilingual English/Chinese edition of poems written in Chinese by Bei Dao; preface by Bei Dao, afterword by Eliot Weinberger; 304 pages; New Directions, ISBN 978-0-8112-1848-1; published in the United States
- János Háy, Egy szerelmes vers története ("The Story of a Love Poem"), Palatinus; Hungary
- Karol Gwóźdź, Myśli ukryte, publisher: Hologram, published in the Upper Silesia, written in Silesian language, ISBN 978-83-930871-0-5

== Awards and honors ==
Awards announced this year:

=== International ===
- Golden Wreath of Poetry: Lyubomir Levchev (Bulgaria)

=== Australia awards and honors ===
- C. J. Dennis Prize for Poetry:
- Kenneth Slessor Prize for Poetry:

=== Canada awards and honors ===
- Archibald Lampman Award: Craig Poile, True Concessions
- Atlantic Poetry Prize: Tonja Gunvaldsen Klaassen, Lean-To
- 2010 Governor General's Awards: Richard Greene, Boxing the Compass (English); Danielle Fournier, effleurés de lumière (French)
- Griffin Poetry Prize:
  - Canadian: Karen Solie, Pigeon
  - International, in the English Language: Eilean Ni Chuilleanain, The Sun-fish
  - Lifetime Recognition Award: Adrienne Rich
- Gerald Lampert Award: James Langer, Gun Dogs
- Pat Lowther Award: Karen Solie, Pigeon
- Prix Alain-Grandbois: Paul Bélanger, Répit
- Dorothy Livesay Poetry Prize: Fred Wah, Is a Door
- Prix Émile-Nelligan: Philippe More, Le laboratoire des anges

=== New Zealand awards and honors ===
- Prime Minister's Awards for Literary Achievement:
- New Zealand Post Book Awards:
  - Poetry Award Winner, Brian Turner, Just This. Victoria University Press
  - NZSA Jessie MacKay Best First Book of Poetry Award Winner: Selina Tusitala Marsh, Fast Talking PI. Auckland University Press

=== United Kingdom awards and honors ===
- Cholmondeley Award: Gillian Allnutt, Colette Bryce, Gwyneth Lewis, Deryn Rees-Jones
- Costa Award (formerly "Whitbread Awards") for poetry: Christopher Reid A Scattering
  - Shortlist:
- English Association's Fellows' Poetry Prizes:
- Eric Gregory Award (for a collection of poems by a poet under the age of 30):
- Forward Poetry Prize:
  - Best Collection:
    - Shortlist: Seamus Heaney (for Human Chain), Lachlan Mackinnon (for Small Hours), Sinéad Morrissey (for Through the Square Window), and Fiona Sampson (for Rough Music), Robin Robertson (for The Wrecking Light), Jo Shapcott (for Of Mutability)
  - Best First Collection:
    - Shortlist: Christian Campbell (for Running the Dusk), Hilary Menos (for Berg), Abegail Morley (for How to Pour Madness into a Teacup), Helen Oswald (for Learning Gravity), Steve Spence (for A Curious Shipwreck), and Sam Willetts (for New Light for the Old Dark)
  - Best Poem:
    - Shortlist: Kate Bingham (for On Highgate Hill), Julia Copus (for An Easy Passage), Lydia Fulleylove (for Night Drive), Chris Jones (for Sentences), Ian Pindar (for Mrs Beltinska in the Bath), and Lee Sands (for The Reach)
- Jerwood Aldeburgh First Collection Prize for poetry:
  - Shortlist:
- Manchester Poetry Prize:
- Michael Marks Award for Pamphlet of the Year: "Advice On Wearing Animal Prints" Selima Hill (Flarestack Poets)
- National Poet of Wales:
- National Poetry Competition 2010:
- T. S. Eliot Prize (United Kingdom and Ireland): Derek Walcott, White Egrets
  - Shortlist (announced in November 2010): 2010 Short List
- The Times/Stephen Spender Prize for Poetry Translation:

=== United States awards and honors ===
- Agnes Lynch Starrett Poetry Prize awarded to Glenn Shaheen for Predatory
- AML Award for Poetry awarded to Marilyn Bushman-Carlton for Her Side of It: Poems
- Andrés Montoya Poetry Prize awarded to Emma Trelles for Tropicalia
- Dwarf Stars Award: Howard V. Hendrix, Bumbershoot
- Kingsley Tufts Poetry Award: D. A. Powell for Chronic
- Lenore Marshall Poetry Prize: John Koethe, Ninety-fifth Street
- National Book Award for Poetry: "Lighthead" by Terrance Hayes
- National Book Critics Circle Award for Poetry: to C.D. Wright for One With Others
- North Carolina Poet Laureate: Cathy Smith Bowers appointed.
- PEN Award for Poetry in Translation: Anne Carson for translation from the Greek of An Oresteia: Agamemnon by Aiskhylos; Elektra by Sophokles; Orestes by Euripides. Judge: Richard Sieburth
- PEN/Voelcker Award for Poetry: Marilyn Hacker
- Poet Laureate of Virginia: Kelly Cherry, two-year appointment 2010 to 2012
- Pulitzer Prize for Poetry (United States): Rae Armantrout, Versed
  - Finalists: Tryst by Angie Estes and Inseminating the Elephant by Lucia Perillo
- Raiziss/de Palchi Translation Award: Paul Vangelisti
- Rhysling Award:
  - Kendall Evans & Samantha Henderson, In the Astronaut Asylum (Long Form)
  - Ann K. Schwader, To Theia (Short Form)
- Ruth Lilly Poetry Prize : Eleanor Ross Taylor
- Wallace Stevens Award: Galway Kinnell
- Whiting Awards: Matt Donovan, Jane Springer, L.B. Thompson

==== From the Poetry Society of America ====
- Frost Medal: Lucille Clifton
- Shelley Memorial Award: Kenneth Irby / Eileen Myles Judges:
- Writer Magazine/Emily Dickinson Award: Marlene Rosen Fine Judge: Marie Ponsot
- Lyric Poetry Award: Ira Sadoff Judge: Megan O'Rourke
- Lucille Medwick Memorial Award: Sandra Stone Judge: Juan Felipe Herrera; finalist:
- Alice Fay Di Castagnola Award: Rebecca Morgan Frank Judge: Marilyn Hacker; finalists:
- Louise Louis/Emily F. Bourne Student Poetry Award: Liya Person-Rechtman Judge: Arda Collins; finalists:
- George Bogin Memorial Award: Sawnie Morris Judge:Hettie Jones
- Robert H. Winner Memorial Award: Leslie Williams Judge: David St. John; finalists:
- Cecil Hemley Memorial Award: Karla Kelsey Judge: Forrest Gander
- Norma Farber First Book Award: Scott Coffel Judge: Edward Hirsch
- William Carlos Williams Award: Eleanor Ross Taylor Judge: Lynn Emanuel; finalists:

==== From the Poetry Society of Virginia Student Poetry Contest ====
2010 Student Poetry Contest Winners :: Poetry Society Prize

- 1st place Catherine Ray, Edgecomb, Maine for the poem "Where Poems Hide For Me"
- 2nd place Sophia Rose Carbonneau, Edgecomb, Maine for the poem "Alter Ego"
- 3rd place Abbie Hinchman, Edgecomb, Maine for the poem “What's in My Journal”
- 1st Honorable Mention Abbey Hutchins, Edgecomb, Maine for the poem "Wabanaki"
- 2nd Honorable Mention Hari Srinivasan, Cupertino, CA for the poem “Non-Entity”
- 3rd Honorable Mention Sophie Bell, Pound Ridge, NY for the poem "The Calming Book"

2010 Student Poetry Contest Winners :: Jenkins Prize

- 1st place Edyt Dickstein, Livingston, NJ for the poem "Promises"

2010 Student Poetry Contest Winners :: Virginia Student Prize

- 1st place Lauren Rae (Wren) Brown, Springfield, VA for the poem “Truly (Louis XVI's monologue)”
- 2nd place Meredith Makhoul, Richmond VA for the poem "Intersection of Patterson and Chopt"
- 3rd place Taylor Knight, Richmond, VA for the poem "Father"
- 1st Honorable Mention Audrey Crothers, Virginia Beach, VA for the poem "Odysseus Returns"
- 2nd Honorable Mention James Ruml, Richmond, VA for the poem "I Wanted"
- 3rd Honorable Mention Hunter Johnson, Richmond, VA for the poem "English Class"

2010 Student Poetry Contest Winners :: S-8 Category – Undergraduate College

- 1st place Chelsea Henderson, Charlottesville, VA for the poem "Indignities"
- 2nd place Stephanie Wang, Roslyn, NY for the poem "He Wrote My Name In Snow"
- 3rd place Audrey Walls, Richmond, VA for the poem “My Sister, January 1989”
- 1st Honorable Mention Liam Kane-Grade, Prairie du Sac, WI for the poem "Ants in the Rain"
- 2nd Honorable Mention Nathan W. Friedman, Richmond, VA for the poem, “Re-enactors”

2010 Student Poetry Contest Winners :: S-5 Category – Grades 9 & 10

- 1st place Amber Brown, Oak Park, IL for the poem "Moon"
- 2nd place Alexis Mia Phillips, Oak Park IL for the poem “Case# 07CR0304”
- 3rd place Damiano R. Girona, Newport News, VA for the poem "Natural Love"

2010 Student Poetry Contest Winners :: S-4 Category – Grades 7 & 8

- 1st place Maria Abrams, Bedford, NY for the poem "Sentences"
- 2nd place Domonique, Hampton, VA for the poem "Just Because"
- 3rd place Heidi Ziegra, Edgecomb, ME for the poem “Blue Jay, Black Cat”
- 1st Honorable Mention Corey Albright, Bedford NY, for the poem "The Bus"
- 2nd Honorable Mention Abby Williams, Richmond, VA for the poem "Devotion"
- 3rd Honorable Mention Abbey Hutchins for the poem "Together"

== Deaths ==
Birth years link to the corresponding "[year] in poetry" article:

- January 1 – Bingo Gazingo, 85, American performance poet, struck by car
- January 8 – Slavka Maneva, 75, Macedonian writer and poet
- January 11 – Fina de Calderón, 82, Spanish
- January 14 – P. K. Page, 93 (born 1916), Canadian poet
- January 20:
  - Taner Baybars, 73, Cypriot-born British poet and painter
  - Avrom Sutzkever, 96 (born 1913), Israeli, Yiddish-language poet
- February 6 – Robert Dana, 80 (born 1929), American poet, was the poet laureate for the State of Iowa from 2004 to 2008, pancreatic cancer.
- February 13 – Lucille Clifton, 73 (born 1936), American poet and former Poet Laureate of Maryland (1974–1985).
- March 12 – Todd Moore, 72 (born 1937), American poet
- March 14 – Vinda Karandikar, 91 (born 1918), Indian, Marathi-language poet and writer, after short illness.
- March 15 - Kazim al-Samawi, 85 (born 1925), Iraqi poet.
- March 20 – Ai, 62 (born 1947), American poet whose book Vice (1999) won the National Book Award for Poetry. Born Florence Anthony, she legally changed her name to Ai.
- April 2 – Carolyn Rodgers, 69 (born 1940), American poet based in Chicago, participated in Gwendolyn Brooks's Writers Workshops and gained prominence as part of the Black Arts Movement.
- April 5 – William Neill, 88 (born 1922), Scottish poet.
- April 23 – Peter Porter, 81 (born 1929), Australian-born British poet. Associated with referred to in Britain as The Group, he was also recipient of the Medal of the Order of Australia.
- May 6 – Hoàng Cầm, 88 (born 1922), Vietnamese poet and playwright
- May 7 – Rane Arroyo, 55 (born 1954), American poet and playwright.
- May 10 – David Chaloner, 65 (born 1944), English designer (of interior public spaces) and poet
- May 17:
  - Mukhran Machavariani (Georgian: მუხრან მაჭავარიანი), 81 (born 1929), Georgian poet, died while delivering a speech on the stage of the Rustaveli Theatre on the occasion of the 85th birthday of a fellow poet, Pridon Khalvashi
  - Judson Crews, 92 (born 1917), American poet, small press publisher, and bookseller.

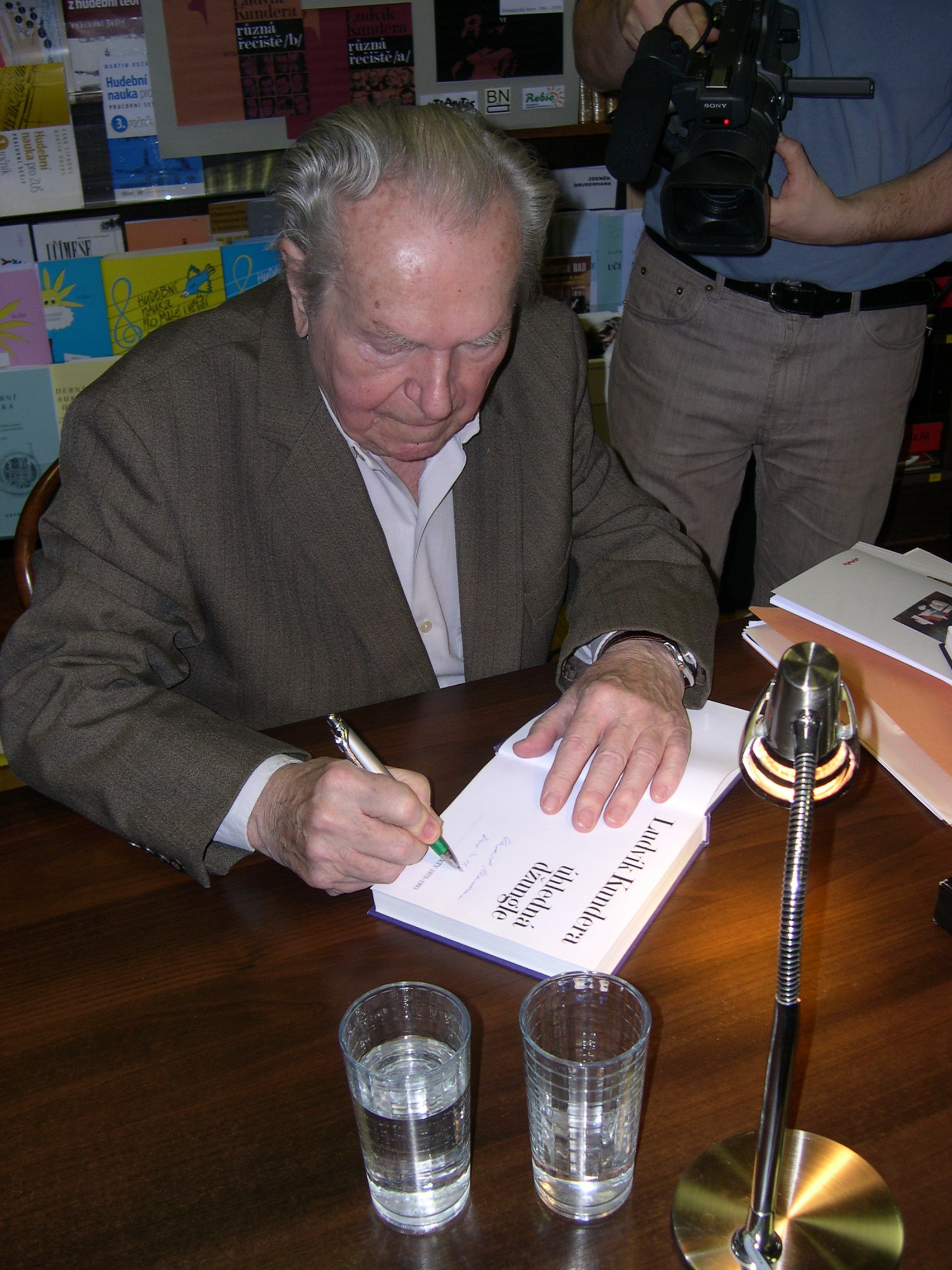
Czech poet Ludvik Kundera in 2009

- May 18:
  - Edoardo Sanguineti, 79 (born 1930), Italian poet, playwright, critic and winner of the Bagutta Prize.
  - Peter Seaton, 67 (born 1942), American poet associated with the Language poetry movement, of an apparent heart attack.
- May 20 – Alberto Valcárcel Acuña, 65, Peruvian In a tribute to Valcarcel organized by Argentine poet Gabriel Impaglione, 30 poets recited free-verse poems on May 31.
- May 21 – Driek van Wissen, 66, Dutch poet, intracranial hemorrhage
- May 22 – Veturi (Telugu: వేటూరి సుందరరామమూర్తి), 74, Telugu-language Indian poet, journalist, writer and lyricist in the Indian cinema, cardiac arrest.
- May 28 – Leslie Scalapino, 65 (born 1944), American poet, playwright, and editor, winner of the American Book Award.
- May 30 – Peter Orlovsky, 76 (born 1933), American poet and lifelong companion of Beat Generation poet Allen Ginsberg.
- June 1 – Andrei Voznesensky, 77 (born 1933), Russian poet
- June 7:
  - José Albi, 88 (born 1922), Spanish poet, literary critic and translator
  - Ndoc Gjetja, 66 (born 1944), Albanian poet and magazine editor, after long illness

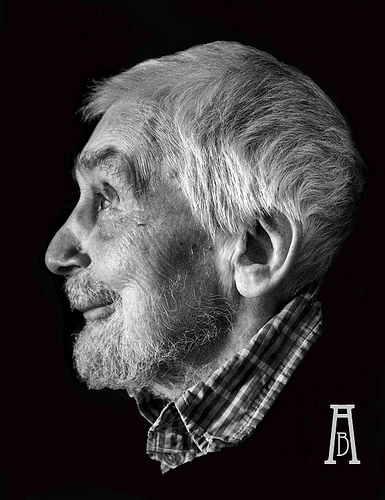
Scottish poet Edwin Morgan, in February

- June 16 – Allen Hoey, 57 (born 1952), American poet who received a Pulitzer prize nomination for his 2008 collection Country Music,, of a heart attack.
- June 18 – Jose Saramago, 87 (born 1922), Portuguese novelist, playwright, poet, essayist, communist political commentator and winner of the 1998 Nobel Prize for literature
- July 2 – Tommy Tabermann, 62 (born 1947), Finnish poet and politician
- July 3 – Roberto Piva, 72 (born 1937), Brazilian poet and writer
- July 5 – Pete Morgan, 71 (born 1939), English
- July 12 – Tuli Kupferberg, 86, American Beat poet and singer
- August 3 – Marilyn Buck, 62 (born 1947), radical American left-wing terrorist and poet
- August 15 – Ghazi Abdul Rahman Algosaibi, 70 (born 1940), Saudi Arabian statesman, writer, novelist and poet
- August 16 – Narayan Gangaram Surve (Devanagari: नारायण गंगाराम सुर्वे), 83 (born 1926), Indian, Marathi-language poet
- August 17:
  - Ludvik Kundera, 90 (born 1920), Czech writer, translator, poet, playwright, editor and literary historian; a cousin of Milan Kundera
  - Edwin Morgan, 90 (born 1920), Scottish poet in English and Scots, appointed first "Scottish Makar" (national poet of Scotland) in 2004, an honor which he held the rest of his life
- August 27:
  - George Hitchcock, 96 (born 1914), American poet; editor and publisher of Kayak magazine and books.
  - Ravindra Kelekar, 85 (born 1925), Indian author, poet and activist, after short illness.
- September 3:
  - Micky Burn, 97 (born 1912), English writer, journalist, World War II commando and prize-winning poet
  - Carmelo Arden Quin, 97 (born 1913), Uruguayan poet, political writer, painter, sculptor and co-founder of the international artistic movement “Madi”
- September 27:
  - Michael Gizzi, 61 (born 1949), American poet and editor, author of more than 10 books of poetry
  - Carmelo Arden Quin, 97 (born 1913), Uruguayan poet, painter and sculptor
- October 21:
  - A. Ayyappan, 61 (born 1949), Indian poet
  - Kjell Landmark, 80 (born 1930), Norwegian poet and politician
- October 22 – Alí Chumacero, 92 (born 1918), Mexican writer and poet
- November 4:
  - Viola Fischerová, 75 (born 1935), Czech poet
  - Ophelia Alcantara Dimalanta, 76 (born 1934), Filipino poet
- November 5 – Adrian Păunescu, 67 (born 1943), Romanian author, poet and politician.
- November 9 – Ektor Kaknavatos, 90 (born 1920), Greek poet, pen name of Yorgis Kontoyorgis.
- November 11 – Carlos Edmundo de Ory, 87 (born 1923), Spanish poet, leukemia.
- November 29 – Bella Akhmadulina, 73 (born 1937), Soviet and Russian poet, short story writer and translator.
- December 23 – Janine Pommy Vega, 68,(born 1942) American Beat Generation poet.

== See also ==
- Poetry
- List of poetry awards
- The Poetry Society of Virginia official website ~ Student Poetry Contest List of Winners & Awards
