= 1998 in poetry =

Nationality words link to articles with information on the nation's poetry or literature (for instance, Irish or France).

== Events ==
- May 12 — John Montague is named as first holder of The Ireland Chair of Poetry.
- August — English poet and playwright Tony Harrison's film-poem Prometheus is first shown.
- Fall — Skanky Possum poetry magazine founded in Austin, Texas (it will run until 2012}.
- Samizdat poetry magazine founded in Chicago (it will run until 2004).

== Works published in English ==
Listed by nation where the work was first published and again by the poet's native land, if different; substantially revised works listed separately:

=== Australia ===
- Robert Gray, New Selected Poems
- Jennifer Harrison, Dear B (Black Pepper)
- Frieda Hughes, Wooroloo, English-born Australian poet, originally published in United States by Harper Flamingo
- John Leonard, editor, Australian Verse: An Oxford Anthology, Melbourne: Oxford University Press (anthology)
- Philip Salom, New and Selected Poems. (Fremantle Arts Centre) ISBN 978-1-86368-218-3
- John Tranter, Late Night Radio, Polygon Press
- Chris Wallace-Crabbe, Whirling, Oxford: Oxford University Press

=== Canada ===
- Gary Barwin, Outside the Hat, (Coach House Books) ISBN 978-1-55245-030-7
- Stephen Cain, dislexicon (Coach House Books) ISBN 978-1-55245-027-7
- Anne Carson, Autobiography of Red: A Novel in Verse (Knopf); a New York Times "notable book of the year"
- Margaret Christakos, The Moment Coming (Oakville: ECW)
- Don Domanski, Parish of the Psychic Moon
- Louis Dudek, The Poetry of Louis Dudek. Ottawa: The Golden Dog.
- Paul Dutton, Aurealities, (Coach House Books) ISBN 978-0-88910-414-3
- Michael Holmes, Satellite Dishes from the Future Bakery, (Coach House Books) ISBN 978-1-55245-004-8
- Sylvia Legris, Iridium Seeds
- Dorothy Livesay, Archive for Our Times: Previously Uncollected and Unpublished Poems of Dorothy Livesay, Irvine Dean ed. Vancouver: Arsenal Pulp Press.
- Michael Ondaatje, Handwriting, Toronto: McClelland & Stewart; New York: Knopf, 1999 ISBN 0-375-40559-3
- E. J. Pratt, Selected Poems of E. J. Pratt, Sandra Djwa, W.J. Keith, and Zailig Pollock ed. Toronto: University of Toronto Press.

==== Canadian anthologies ====
- Allan Forrie, Patrick O'Rourke, and Glen Sorestad, editors, In the Clear: A Contemporary Canadian Poetry Anthology, Saskatoon: Thistledown Press
- Kwame Dawes, editor, Wheel and Come Again: An Anthology of Reggae Poetry, Fredericton, New Brunswick: Goose Lane

=== India, in English ===
- Arvind Krishna Mehrotra, The Transfiguring Places ( Poetry in English ), Ravi Dayal, New Delhi, ISBN 81-7530-019-1
- K. Satchidanandan, How to go to the Tao Temple, Har-Anand Publications, New Delhi.
- Dilip Chitre, The Mountain, Pune: Vijaya Chitre

=== Ireland ===
- Dermot Bolger, Taking my Letters Back: New and Selected Poems, Dublin: New Island Books
- Ciaran Carson:
  - The Alexandrine Plan, Oldcastle: The Gallery Press, ISBN 978-1-85235-218-9
  - The Twelfth of Never, Oldcastle: The Gallery Press, ISBN 978-1-85235-235-6
- Peter Fallon, News of the World, Oldcastle: The Gallery Press, ISBN 978-1-85235-214-1

=== New Zealand ===
- Raewyn Alexander, Concrete, Auckland: Penguin
- Alan Brunton, Moonshine, Bumper Books
- Roger Robinson and Nelson Wattie, editors, The Oxford Companion to New Zealand Literature, Melbourne; Auckland: Oxford University Press
- Kate Camp, Unfamiliar Legends of the Stars, Victoria University Press

=== United Kingdom ===
- Ciarán Carson: The Alexandrine Plan, (adaptations of sonnets by Baudelaire, Mallarmé, and Rimbaud); Gallery :Press, Wake Forest University Press
- Carol Ann Duffy, The Pamphlet, Anvil Press Poetry
- Paul Farley, The Boy from the Chemist is Here to See You
- Salena Godden, The Fire People
- Seamus Heaney:
  - Audenesque, Maeght
  - Translator, Beowulf
  - Opened Ground: Poems 1966-1996, Faber & Faber; in the United States, published by Farrar, Straus & Giroux; a New York Times "notable book of the year" for 1999
- Paul Henry, The Milk Thief, Seren
- Ted Hughes:
  - Birthday Letters, (Farrar, Straus & Giroux); a verse chronicle of the author's relationship with Sylvia Plath, his late wife; a New York Times "notable book of the year"
  - Translator, Phedre
- Jackie Kay, Off Colour United Kingdom
- Peter Levi, Reed Music
- Kevin MacNeil, Love and Zen in the Outer Hebrides, Scottish poet published in Scotland
- Andrew Motion, Selected Poems 1976–1997
- Paul Muldoon, Hay
- Carol Rumens, Holding Pattern
- Jo Shapcott, My Life Asleep
- Jon Stallworthy, Rounding the Horn

==== Anthologies in the United Kingdom ====
- Simon Armitage and Robert Crawford, editors, Penguin Book of Poetry from Britain and Ireland Since 1945, Viking, ISBN 978-0-670-86829-2
- Sean O'Brien, editor, The Firebox: Poetry in Britain and Ireland after 1945 (Picador), anthology
- Lloyd Searwar, editor, They Came in Ships: An Anthology of Indo-Guyanese Prose and Poetry, Leeds: Peepal Tree

==== Criticism, scholarship and biography in the United Kingdom ====
- Sean O'Brien, The Deregulated Muse: Essays on Contemporary British and Irish Poetry (Bloodaxe), criticism
- John Heath-Stubbs, The literary essays of John Heath-Stubbs, edited by A.T. Tolley
- Michael Schmidt, Lives of the Poets, London: Weidenfeld and Nicolson

=== United States ===
- John Ashbery:
  - The Mooring of Starting Out: The First Five Books of Poetry (Ecco) collection of the poet's work from 1956 to 1972; a New York Times "notable book of the year"
  - Wakefulness
- Renée Ashley, The Various Reasons of Light
- Ted Berrigan, Great Stories of the Chair
- Henri Cole, The Visible Man
- Billy Collins, Picnic, Lightning (ISBN 0-8229-4066-3)
- Fanny Howe, Q
- Deborah Garrison, A Working Girl Can't Win: And Other Poems, (Random House); a New York Times "notable book of the year"
- Lee Harwood, Morning Light
- Kenneth Koch, Straits: Poems, New York: Knopf
- William Logan, Vain Empires: Poems, (Penguin, paper); a New York Times "notable book of the year"
- W. S. Merwin:
  - Translator, East Window: The Asian Translations, translated poems from earlier collections, Port Townsend, Washington: Copper Canyon Press
  - The Folding Cliffs: A Narrative, a "novel-in-verse" New York: Knopf
- Michael Palmer, The Lion Bridge: Selected Poems 1972-1995 (New Directions), first retrospective of Palmer's work selected by the author himself reprinting much work that had gone out of print
- Carl Phillips, From the Devotions
- Marie Ponsot, The Bird Catcher, winner of the National Book Critics Circle Award and finalist for the 1999 Lenore Marshall Poetry Prize
- Frederick Seidel Going Fast: Poems, (Farrar, Straus & Giroux); a New York Times "notable book of the year"
- Mark Strand, Blizzard of One: Poems, (Knopf); a New York Times "notable book of the year"; by a Canadian native long living in and published in the United States
- Patti Smith, Patti Smith Complete
- James Tate, Shroud of the Gnomes: Poems, (Ecco); a New York Times "notable book of the year"
- Richard Tayson, The Apprentice of Fever, winner of the 1997 Stan and Tom Wick Poetry Prize
- Keith and Rosmarie Waldrop, Well Well Reality (The Post-Apollo Press)

==== Criticism, scholarship and biography in the United States ====
- Laurence Breiner, An Introduction to West Indian Poetry, Cambridge University Press, scholarship
- Kenneth Koch, Making Your Own Days: The Pleasures of Reading and Writing Poetry, New York: Scribner
- Eric L. Haralson, editor, Encyclopedia of American Poetry: The Nineteenth Century, Chicago and London: Fitzroy Dearborn
- Mary Oliver, Rules for the Dance: A Handbook for Writing and Reading Metrical Verse

==== Anthologies in the United States ====
- Barbara Tran, Monique T. D. Truong, and Luu Truong Khoi, editors, Watermark: Vietnamese American Poetry & Prose, New York: Asian American Writers' Workshop

===== Poets in The Best American Poetry 1998 =====
Poems from these 75 poets were in The Best American Poetry 1999, general editor David Lehman, guest editor John Hollander:

- Jonathan Aaron
- Agha Shahid Ali
- Dick Allen
- A. R. Ammons
- Daniel Anderson
- James Applewhite
- Craig Arnold
- Sarah Arvio
- John Ashbery
- Frank Bidart
- Robert Bly
- George Bradley
- John Bricuth
- Anne Carson
- Turner Cassity
- Henri Cole
- Billy Collins
- Alfred Corn
- James Cummins
- Thomas M. Disch
- Denise Duhamel
- Lynn Emanuel
- Irving Feldman
- Emily Fragos
- Debora Greger
- Allen Grossman
- Thom Gunn
- Marilyn Hacker
- Rachel Hadas
- Donald Hall
- Joseph Harrison
- Anthony Hecht
- Daryl Hine
- Edward Hirsch
- Richard Howard
- Andrew Hudgins
- Mark Jarman
- Donald Justice
- Brigit Pegeen Kelly
- Karl Kirchwey
- Carolyn Kizer
- Kenneth Koch
- John Koethe
- Rika Lesser
- Phillis Levin
- Philip Levine
- Rebecca McClanahan
- J. D. McClatchy
- Heather McHugh
- Sandra McPherson
- W. S. Merwin
- Robert Mezey
- A. F. Moritz
- Thylias Moss
- William Mullen
- Eric Ormsby
- Jacqueline Osherow
- Robert Pinsky
- Reynolds Price
- Wyatt Prunty
- Stephen Sandy
- Alan Shapiro
- Robert B. Shaw
- Charles Simic
- Mark Strand
- James Tate
- Sidney Wade
- Derek Walcott
- Rosanna Warren
- Rachel Wetzsteon
- Susan Wheeler
- Richard Wilbur
- C. K. Williams
- Greg Williamson
- Charles Wright

== Works published in other languages ==
Listed by nation where the work was first published and again by the poet's native land, if different; substantially revised works listed separately:

=== Denmark ===
- Klaus Høeck; Denmark:
  - Hjem, publisher: Gyldendal
  - Honeymoon, publisher: Gyldendal
- Inger Christensen, Samlede digte ("Collected Poems")

=== French language ===
==== France ====
- Olivier Barbarant, Odes dérisoires et quelques autres un peu moins, publisher: Editions Champ Vallon, ISBN 978-2-87673-272-8
- Salah Stetie, Fievre et guerison de l'icone
- Jean-Michel Maulpoix, Domaine public

=== India ===
Listed in alphabetical order by first name:

- Amarjit Chandan, Chhanna, Navyug, New Delhi; Punjabi-language
- Anamika, Anushtup, Delhi: Kitab Ghar; Hindi-language
- Gagan Gill, Yah Akanksha Samay Nahin, New Delhi: Rajkamal Prakashan, New Delhi, 1998, Bharatiya Jnanpith; Hindi-language
- K. Satchidanandan, Apoornam, ("Imperfect"); Malayalam-language
- Kynpham Sing Nongkynrih, Ban Sngewthuh ia ka Poitri ("Understanding Poetry"), Shillong: Gautam Brothers; Khasi-language
- Mallika Sengupta; Hindi-language:
  - Meyeder Aa Aaa Ka Kha, Kolkata: Prativas Publication
  - Translator, Akaler Madhye Saras, translation from the original Hindi of Kedarnath Singh, Kolkata: Sahitya Akademi
- Manushya Puthiran, Itamum Iruppum, Nagercoil: Kalachuvadu Pathipagam, Tamil language
- Prathibha Nandakumar, Kavadeyata ("Game of Cowry"), Bangalore: Kannada Sangha, Christ College
- Raghavan Atholi, Mozhimattam, Kottayam: Sahitya Pravarthaka Cooperative Society (SPCS)
- Rajendra Bhandari, Kshar/Akshar ("Perishable/ Imperishable"), Gangtok, Sikkim: Jana Paksha Prakashan; Nepali-language
- Varavara Rao (better known as "VV"), Aa Rojulu ("Those Days"), Hyderabad: Akruti Printers

=== Poland ===
- Stanisław Barańczak, Chirurgiczna precyzja ("Surgical Precision"), Krakow: a5
- Zbigniew Herbert:
  - 89 wierszy, ("89 Poems"), Kraków: a5
  - Epilog burzy ("Epilogue to a Storm"), Wrocław: Wydawnictwo Dolnośląskie
- Ewa Lipska:
  - Godziny poza godzinami ("Hours Beyond Hours"), selected poems, Warsaw: PIW
  - Życie zastępcze, Kraków: Wydawnictwo literackie
- Jan Twardowski:
  - Bóg prosi o miłość - Gott fleht um Liebe, Krakow, Poland: Wydawnictwo Literackie
  - Niebo w dobrym humorze, Warsaw: PIW
- Adam Zagajewski, Trzej aniołowie, Three Angels (sic) Kraków: Wydawnictwo Literackie

=== Serbia ===
- Dejan Stojanović, Krugovanje: 1978–1987 (Circling), Second Edition, Narodna knjiga–Alfa, Beograd

=== Spain ===
- Matilde Camus, Fuerza creativa ("Creative strength")

=== Other languages ===
- Christoph Buchwald, general editor, and Marcel Beyer, guest editor, Jahrbuch der Lyrik 1998/99 ("Poetry Yearbook 1998/99"), publisher: Beck; anthology
- Ndoc Gjetja, Dhjata ime ("My Testament"); Albania
- Haim Gouri Ha-Shirim ("The Poems"), in two volumes by an Israeli writing in Hebrew
- Chen Kehua, Yinwei siwang er jingying de fanfu shipian ("Engaging in a Complicated Poetry for the Sake of Death ") Chinese (Taiwan)
- Maria Luisa Spaziani, La traversata dell'oasi, Italy
- Rahman Henry, Banbhojoner Moto Aundhokar ( Darkness as Picnic is), Bengali

== Awards and honors ==
=== Australia ===
- C. J. Dennis Prize for Poetry: Coral Hull, Broken Land
- Kenneth Slessor Prize for Poetry: No awards were presented this year
- Mary Gilmore Prize: Lucy Dougan, Memory Shell

=== Canada ===
- Archibald Lampman Award: Sandra Nicholls, Woman of Sticks, Woman of Stones
- Atlantic Poetry Prize: Carmelita McGrath, To the New World
- Gerald Lampert Award: Mark Sinnett, The Landing
- 1998 Governor General's Awards: Stephanie Bolster, White Stone: The Alice Poems (English); Suzanne Jacob, La Part de feu / Le Deuil de la rancune (French)
- Pat Lowther Award: Barbara Nickel, The Gladys Elegies
- Prix Alain-Grandbois: Paul Chanel Malenfant, Fleuves
- Dorothy Livesay Poetry Prize: Patricia Young, What I Remember from My Time on Earth
- Prix Émile-Nelligan: Tony Tremblay, Rue Pétrole-Océan

=== India ===
- Sahitya Akademi Award : Arun Kamal for Naye Ilake Mein
- Poetry Society India National Poetry Competition : K. Srilata for In Santa Cruz, Diagnosed Home Sick

=== New Zealand ===
- Prime Minister's Awards for Literary Achievement:
- Montana New Zealand Book Awards (no award given in poetry category this year) First-book award for poetry: Kapka Kassabova, All Roads Lead to the Sea, Auckland University Press

=== United Kingdom ===
- Cholmondeley Award: Roger McGough, Robert Minhinnick, Anne Ridler, Ken Smith
- Eric Gregory Award: Mark Goodwin, Joanne Limburg, Patrick McGuinness, Kona Macphee, Esther Morgan, Christiania Whitehead, Frances Williams
- Forward Poetry Prize Best Collection: Ted Hughes, Birthday Letters (Faber and Faber)
- Forward Poetry Prize Best First Collection: Paul Farley, The Boy from the Chemist is Here to See You (Picador)
- Queen's Gold Medal for Poetry: Les Murray
- T. S. Eliot Prize (United Kingdom and Ireland): Ted Hughes, Birthday Letters (Faber and Faber)
- Whitbread Award for poetry and for book of the year: Ted Hughes, Birthday Letters (Faber and Faber)
- National Poetry Competition : Caroline Carver for Horse Underwater

=== United States ===
- Agnes Lynch Starrett Poetry Prize: Shara McCallum, The Water Between Us
- Aiken Taylor Award for Modern American Poetry: X.J. Kennedy
- American Academy of Arts and Letters Gold Medal for Drama: Horton Foote
- American Academy of Arts and Letters: Robert Fagles elected a member of the Literature Department
- American Book Award: Angela Y. Davis, Blues Legacies and Black Feminism: Gertrude "Ma" Rainey, Bessie Smith, and Billie Holiday
- American Book Award: Allison Hedge Coke, Dog Road Woman, Coffee House Press "American Book Award 1998"
- AML Award for poetry to Alex Caldiero for Various Atmospheres: Poems and Drawings
- Bernard F. Connors Prize for Poetry: Sherod Santos, "Elegy for My Sister", and (separately) Neil Azevedo, "Caspar Hauser Songs"
- Bobbitt National Prize for Poetry: Frank Bidart, Desire
- National Book Award for poetry: Gerald Stern, This Time: New and Selected Poems
- Poet Laureate of Virginia: Joseph Awad, two year appointment 1998 to 2000
- Pulitzer Prize for Poetry: Charles Wright, Black Zodiac
- Rhysling Award:
  - Laurel Winter, why goldfish shouldn't use power tools
  - John Grey, Explaining Frankenstein to His Mother (Short Form)
- Ruth Lilly Poetry Prize: W.S. Merwin
- Wallace Stevens Award: A. R. Ammons
- William Carlos Williams Award: John Balaban, Locusts at the Edge of Summer: New and Selected Poems, Judge: Robert Phillips
- Whiting Awards: Nancy Eimers, Daniel Hall, James Kimbrell, Charles Harper Webb, Greg Williamson
- Fellowship of the Academy of American Poets: Charles Simic

== Births ==
- Amanda Gorman, American poet

== Deaths ==
Birth years link to the corresponding "[year] in poetry" article:

- January 23 — John Forbes, 47 (born 1915), Australian poet
- February 8
  - Enoch Powell, 85 (born 1912), British MP from 1950 to 1987, classicist and poet
  - Niall Sheridan, 85 (born 1912), Irish poet, fiction writer and broadcaster
- March 23 — Hilda Morley, 81 (born 1916), American poet, after a fall
- April 19 — Octavio Paz, 84 (born 1914), Mexican writer, poet, diplomat and winner of the 1990 Nobel Prize in Literature
- April 21 — Ivan Chtcheglov, 65 (born 1933), French political theorist, activist and poet
- April 30 — Nizar Qabbani, 75 (born 1923), Syrian diplomat, poet and publisher of Arabic poetry
- May 29 — Philip O'Connor, 81 (born 1916), English writer and surrealist poet
- June 25 — John Malcolm Brinnin, 81 (born 1916), American poet and critic
- July 1 — Martin Seymour-Smith, 70 (born 1928), English poet, critic and biographer
- July 14 — Miroslav Holub, 75 (born 1923), Czech poet and immunologist
- July 28 — Zbigniew Herbert, 73 (born 1924), influential Polish poet, essayist and moralist
- August 26 — Ryūichi Tamura 田村隆, 75 (born 1923), Japanese Shōwa period poet, essayist and translator of English-language novels and poetry
- October 25 – Dick Higgins, 60 (born 1938), English-born poet, composer and early Fluxus artist with ties to the Language poets
- October 28 — Ted Hughes, 68 (born 1930), English poet, Poet Laureate of the United Kingdom since 1984
- Date not known
  - Aimee Joan Grunberger, 44, American poet, of cancer
  - Michalis Katsaros (born 1919), Greek poet

== See also ==
- Poetry
- List of years in poetry
- List of poetry awards
