= Todd F. Davis =

American poet

Todd F. Davis (born 1965) is a prize-winning American poet and critic.

== Life and work ==
Todd F. Davis (born March 29, 1965, in Elkhart, Indiana) is Professor of English and Environmental Studies at Penn State University's Altoona College. He is the author of eight books of poetry, three literary anthologies, and the author or editor of several volumes of literary criticism.

The winner of the Gwendolyn Brooks Poetry Prize, awarded by the Society for the Study of Midwestern Literature, as well as the Foreword INDIE Book of the Year, and the Chautauqua Editors Prize. Davis has published poems in numerous national and international journals and magazines, including Poetry Daily, Verse Daily, The North American Review, The Iowa Review, The Gettysburg Review, Indiana Review, The Christian Science Monitor, Orion, Shenandoah, River Styx, Sou’wester, 5 AM, Quarterly West, Green Mountains Review, Poetry East, West Branch, Epoch, The Louisville Review, and Image.

Davis is the author of eight books of poetry—Ripe (2002), Some Heaven (2007), The Least of These (2010), Household of Water, Moon, and Snow: The Thoreau Poems (2010), and In the Kingdom of the Ditch (2013), "Winterkill" (2016), "Native Species" (2019), "Coffin Honey" (2022), and "Ditch Memory: New & Selected Poems (2024)—as well as co-editor, with Erin Murphy, of the anthology, Making Poems (2010), co-editor with Noah Davis and Carolyn Mahan of the anthology, "A Literary Field Guide to Northern Appalachia" (2024), and editor of "Fast Break to Line Break: Poets on the Art of Basketball" (2012). Garrison Keillor has featured Davis's poems on The Writer's Almanac, and Ted Kooser has selected his poems to appear in the nationally syndicated American Life in Poetry column.

As literary critic, Davis is the author of several books related to ethical criticism and postmodern humanism, including Kurt Vonnegut’s Crusade, or How a Postmodern Harlequin Preached a New Kind of Humanism (2006) and, with Kenneth Womack, Postmodern Humanism in Contemporary Literature and Culture: Reconciling the Void (2006).

In 1987, Davis earned a B.A. from Grace College in Winona Lake, Indiana, and M.A. and Ph.D. degrees in English from Northern Illinois University in 1991 and 1995, respectively.

Davis lives near the village of Tipton, Pennsylvania, with his wife Shelly and their sons.

== Books ==
=== Poetry ===
- Ditch Memory (Lansing, MI: Michigan State University Press, 2024).
- Coffin Honey (Lansing, MI: Michigan State University Press, 2023).
- Native Species (Lansing, MI: Michigan State University Press, 2019).
- Winterkill (Lansing, MI: Michigan State University Press, 2016).
- In the Kingdom of the Ditch (Lansing, MI: Michigan State University Press, 2013).
- Fast Break to Line Break: Poets on the Art of Basketball (Lansing, MI: Michigan State University Press, 2012).
- The Least of These: Poems (Lansing, MI: Michigan State University Press, 2010).
- Household of Water, Moon, and Snow: The Thoreau Poems (Lewisburg, PA: Seven Kitchens Press, 2010).
- Making Poems: Forty Poems with Commentary by the Poets (Albany: State University of New York Press, 2010; co-edited with Erin Murphy).
- Some Heaven: Poems (Lansing, MI: Michigan State University Press, 2007).
- Ripe: Poems (Huron, OH: Bottom Dog Press, 2002).

=== Scholarship ===
- Postmodern Humanism in Contemporary Literature and Culture: Reconciling the Void (New York: Palgrave, 2006; co-authored with Kenneth Womack).
- Kurt Vonnegut’s Crusade, or How a Postmodern Harlequin Preached a New Kind of Humanism (Albany: State University of New York Press, 2006).
- Reading the Beatles: Cultural Studies, Literary Criticism, and the Fab Four (Albany: State University of New York Press, 2006; co-edited with Kenneth Womack).
- The Critical Response to John Irving (Westport, CT: Praeger, 2004; co-edited with Kenneth Womack).
- Formalist Criticism and Reader-Response Theory (New York: Palgrave, 2002; co-authored with Kenneth Womack).
- Mapping the Ethical Turn: A Reader in Ethics, Culture, and Literary Theory (Charlottesville: University of Virginia Press, 2001; co-edited with Kenneth Womack).
