= Erin Murphy (poet) =

American poet

Erin Murphy is an American poet who is credited with inventing the demi-sonnet. She received her B.A. in English and Philosophy from Washington College, and an M.F.A. in Poetry from the University of Massachusetts, Amherst's MFA Program for Poets & Writers (MFA Fellowship recipient). Murphy is Professor of English and Creative Writing faculty at The Pennsylvania State University, Altoona College.

== Publications ==
=== Books ===
- Science of Desire (Word Poetry, 2004), a finalist for the Paterson Poetry Prize.
- Dislocation and Other Theories (Word Poetry, 2008), winner of the Paterson Prize for Literary Excellence
- Too Much of this World (Mammoth Books, 2008), winner of the Anthony Piccione Poetry Prize.
- Making Poems: Forty Poems with Commentary by the Poets (SUNY Press, 2010)
- Word Problems: Demi-Sonnets (Word Poetry, 2011), winner of the Paterson Prize for Literary Excellence
- Distant Glitter (Word Poetry, 2013), Foreword INDIES Book of the Year Award finalist
- Ancilla (Lamar University Press, 2014), winner of the Womack Book Award
- Creating Nonfiction: Twenty Essays and Interviews with the Writers (SUNY Press, 2016), winner of the Foreword INDIES Book of the Year Award
- Remorse Code: Demi-Sonnets (Seven Kitchens Press, 2024), winner of the Keystone Chapbook Series competition
- Assisted Living: Demi Sonnets (Brick Road Poetry Press, 2018), winner of the Brick Road Poetry Prize
- Bodies of Truth: Personal Narratives on Illness, Disability, and Medicine (University of Nebraska Press, 2019), winner of the Foreword INDIES Book of the Year Award
- Taxonomies: Demi-Sonnets (Word Poetry, 2022)
- Fields of Ache: Centos (Ghost City Press, 2024), chapbook available as free PDF
- Fluent in Blue (Grayson Books, 2024)

=== Other ===
Murphy's poems have appeared in journals and anthologies such as The Georgia Review, The Southern Humanities Review, Women's Studies Quarterly, Rattle, Field, Nimrod, Subtropics, The Paterson Literary Review, Literal Latte, Mississippi Review, Green Mountains Review, Kalliope and 180 More Extraordinary Poems for Every Day, edited by Billy Collins (Random House, 2005).

== Other awards ==
Murphy's other awards include the National Writers Union Poetry Award (judged by Donald Hall), the Normal School Poetry Prize judged by Nick Flynn, the Rattle Poetry Prize Readers Choice Award, a Dorothy Sargent Rosenberg Poetry Award, numerous Pushcart Prize nominations, the Foley Poetry Award, University of Massachusetts M.F.A. Poetry Fellowship, a Maryland State Arts Council Individual Artist Award, and an Individual Creative Artist Fellowship from the Pennsylvania Council on the Arts.

Murphy was inducted into the Blair County Arts Hall of Fame on October 8, 2015.

She is Poet Laureate of Blair County.

She was named Penn State University's inaugural Mellon Academic Leadership Fellow for the Big Ten Academic Alliance for 2023-25.
