= Claire Crowther =

British poet

Claire Crowther is a British poet and author of five full-length poetry collections, Stretch of Closures, The Clockwork Gift, On Narrowness, Solar Cruise and A Pair of Three and six pamphlets, Knithoard, Bare George, Silents, Incense, Mollicle, and Glass Harmonica. Crowther is Deputy and Reviews Editor of Long Poem Magazine.

== Education ==
Crowther was awarded a first class BA in English Language and Literature from Manchester University and a doctorate in creative writing from Kingston University.

== Career ==
The Clockwork Gift, Crowther's 2009 collection with Shearsman Books, is "a long poem project exploring the conflicts between the cultural expectations and real lives of twentieth-century grandmothers." Of her third full-length poetry collection published in 2015, On Narrowness, it has been written that "her poetry is never easy [...] but it’s hugely rewarding, because Crowther’s curiosity about both words and the processes of living and dying compel you to consider familiar subjects in a fresh way."

Crowther's poetry has been widely reviewed, being described in some cases as "urgent music [...] condensed, quick-witted poems," "quirky without being fey, not troubling to reassure the reader, [the poems] give the impression of an uncompromising intelligence at work," and "crystal-clear [but] more often [...] riddling, veering, mysterious; deadly serious or quietly funny." Crowther's poetry has been published in several journals such as the London Review of Books, PN Review, Poetry Wales, and Blackbox Manifold, among others.

In 2014, Crowther undertook a Poet-in-Residence position with the Royal Mint Museum and she has also reviewed books and written essays.

== Awards and honours ==
Crowther's collection Stretch of Closures (Shearsman Books, 2007) was shortlisted for the Aldeburgh Best First Collection Prize. In 2015 her work was published in the Best British Poetry 2015 with Salt Publishing. Solar Cruise was awarded a Poetry Book Society Recommendation for Spring 2020.

== Personal life ==
Crowther has two daughters and lives in Somerset with her husband Keith Barnham, a solar physicist.
