= Musharraf Ali Farooqi =

Pakistani-Canadian author and translator

- مشرف علی فاروقی
- Born: 26 July 1968 (age 58); Hyderabad, Pakistan
- Occupations: Author, translator, editor and publisher
- Writing career
- Language: English
- Website: micromaf.com

Musharraf Ali Farooqi (born 26 July 1968) is a Pakistani-Canadian author, translator, and storyteller. Farooqi was among the five writers shortlisted for Asia's most prestigious literary prize in 2012. In addition to his fiction and translation projects, he is working on establishing an Urdu language publishing program specializing in children's literature and classics. He founded the publishing house KITAB (2012), launched the online index Urdu Thesaurus (2016), and designed the interactive storytelling and reading initiative STORYKIT Program (2016). These three projects have been integrated in an activity-based learning program for children.

The Merman and the Book of Power: A Qissa is his newest work.

== Biography ==
Farooqi received his early education in Hyderabad, at St Bonaventure's High School. He later attended Model School and College in Hyderabad, Sindh and, afterwards, NED University of Engineering and Technology in Karachi for three years, though he did not finish his degree.

Farooqi is the author of the novel Between Clay and Dust, which was shortlisted for the Man Asian Literary Prize. His earlier novel, The Story of a Widow, was shortlisted for the 2011 DSC Prize for South Asian Literature and considered for the 2010 International Dublin Literary Award. Rabbit Rap is a modernist fable for young adults. His children's books include the collection The Amazing Moustaches of Moochhander the Iron Man and Other Stories, illustrated by Michelle Farooqi, which was shortlisted for the India ComicCon Award in the "Best Publication for Children" category, and the picture book The Cobbler's Holiday: or Why Ants Don't Wear Shoes.

Farooqi's translation of the 1871 version of Dastan-e Amir Hamza (Adventures of Amir Hamza) by Ghalib Lakhnavi and Abdullah Bilgrami was published in October 2007. He published the first book of a projected 24-volume translation of the world's first magical fantasy epic, Hoshruba, in 2009. A selection from his translation of contemporary Urdu poet Afzal Ahmed Syed's poetry was published by the Wesleyan University Press Poetry Series in 2010.

In 2023 he won the inaugural Armory Square Prize for Translation for his translation of Siddique Alam's collection The Kettledrum, to be published in 2024 by Open Letter Books.

== Awards and honours ==
- Winner, Armory Square Prize for Translation, 2023
- Finalist, 2012 Man Asian Literary Prize, for the novel Between Clay and Dust
- 2011 PEN/Heim Translation Fund Grant for Hoshruba: The Prisoner of Batin, translated from the Urdu
- Finalist, 2011 DSC Prize, for The Story of a Widow
- Fellow, Harvard South Asia Institute, Spring 2017
- Former Member Executive Committee, Board of Governors of the Archaeology and Literary Heritage Endowment Fund of the Government of Pakistan
- PEN/Heim Translation Fund Grant 2011 for Hoshruba

== Bibliography ==
=== Novels ===
- Between Clay and Dust: A Novel (Aleph Book Company, 2012)
- The Story of a Widow (Alfred A. Knopf, 2008)
- Salar Jang's Passion (Summersdale Publishers, UK, 2002; HarperCollins India, 2001)

=== Qissas ===
- The Merman and the Book of Power - (Aleph Book Company, 2019)
- The Jinn Darazgosh (2010)

=== Children's fiction ===
- Monster Folktales from Pakistan -
- Tik-Tik: The Master of Time – children's novel
- Rabbit Rap (Viking/Penguin Books India, 2012) – an illustrated novel with art by Michelle Farooqi
- The Amazing Moustaches of Moochhander the Iron Man & Other Stories (Puffin India, 2011) – illustrated by Michelle Farooqi
- The Cobbler's Holiday: or Why Ants Don’t Wear Shoes (Roaring Brook Press, 2008)

=== Translations ===
- Rococo and Other Worlds – Selected Poetry of Afzal Ahmed Syed (Wesleyan University Press Poetry Series, 2010)
- The Beast (Tranquebar Press/Westland Books, 2010) – translation of Syed Muhammad Ashraf's Urdu novella Numberdar ka Neela
- Hoshruba: The Land and the Tilism (2009) – originally published (1883–1893) in Urdu as Tilism-e Hoshruba by Muhammad Husain Jah and Ahmed Husain Qamar
- The Adventures of Amir Hamza (2007) – originally written in Urdu by Ghalib Lakhnavi
- The Adventures of Amir Hamza
- Mouse Pickle (2012)
- Three Sindhi Folktales (2014)
- Chhabili the Innkeeper
- The Ingenious Farkhanda and the Two Conditions
- The Adventures of a Trickster Woman
- The Adventures of a Soldier
- The Victim of Malice
- The Qissa of Azar Shah and Saman Rukh Bano
- قصّہ آذر شاہ و سمن رُخ بانو
- قصّۂ مقتولِ جفا
- قصّہ شہزادی فرخندہ کا
- قصّہ ایک عیّارہ کا

=== Folktale retellings in Urdu ===
- پیٹو ریچھ اور شاندار کھچڑی 2019
- بینگن شہزادی 2019
- مٹریا اور پٹریا 2019
- جوں چٹ پٹ 2018
- پودنا اور پودنی 2017

=== Essays ===
- Singh, Jai Arjun, ed. (2011). "The Foot-Worshipper's Guide to Watching Maula Jatt". The Popcorn Essayists: What Movies Do to Writers. Tranquebar.
- "The Poetics of Amir Hamza's World: Notes on the Ghalib Lakhnavi/Abdullah Bilgrami Version". Annual of Urdu Studies. 24: 89–97. 2009.
- "Introduction to Tilism-e Hoshruba". Annual of Urdu Studies. 24: 71–88. 2009.
- "The Simurgh Feather Guide to the Poetics of Dastan-e Amir Hamza Sahibqiran". Annual of Urdu Studies. 15: 119–167. 2000.
