= Vera Pavlova =

Russian poet

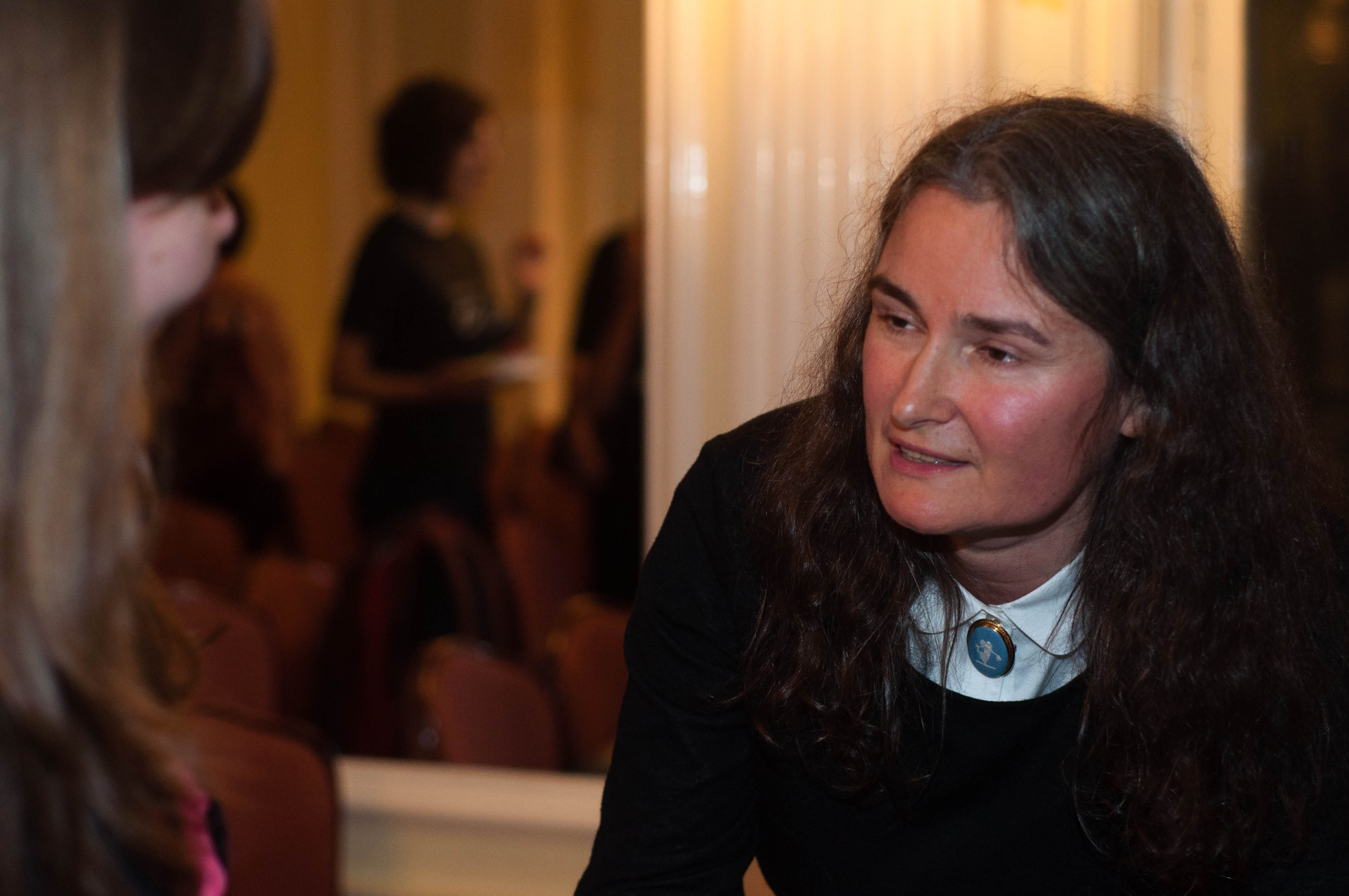
Pavlova at an event hosted by Boston University in 2014.

Vera Anatolyevna Pavlova (Russian: Вера Анатольевна Павлова; born 1963) is a Russian poet.

== Biography ==
Vera Pavlova was born in Moscow, 1963. She studied at the Oktyabryskaya Revolyutsiya Music College and only started publishing after graduation. She graduated from the Gnessin Academy, specializing in the history of music.

She is the author of twenty collections of poetry, four opera libretti, and lyrics to two cantatas. Her works have been translated into twenty five languages. Her work has been published in The New Yorker.
