= Jean-Michel Maulpoix =

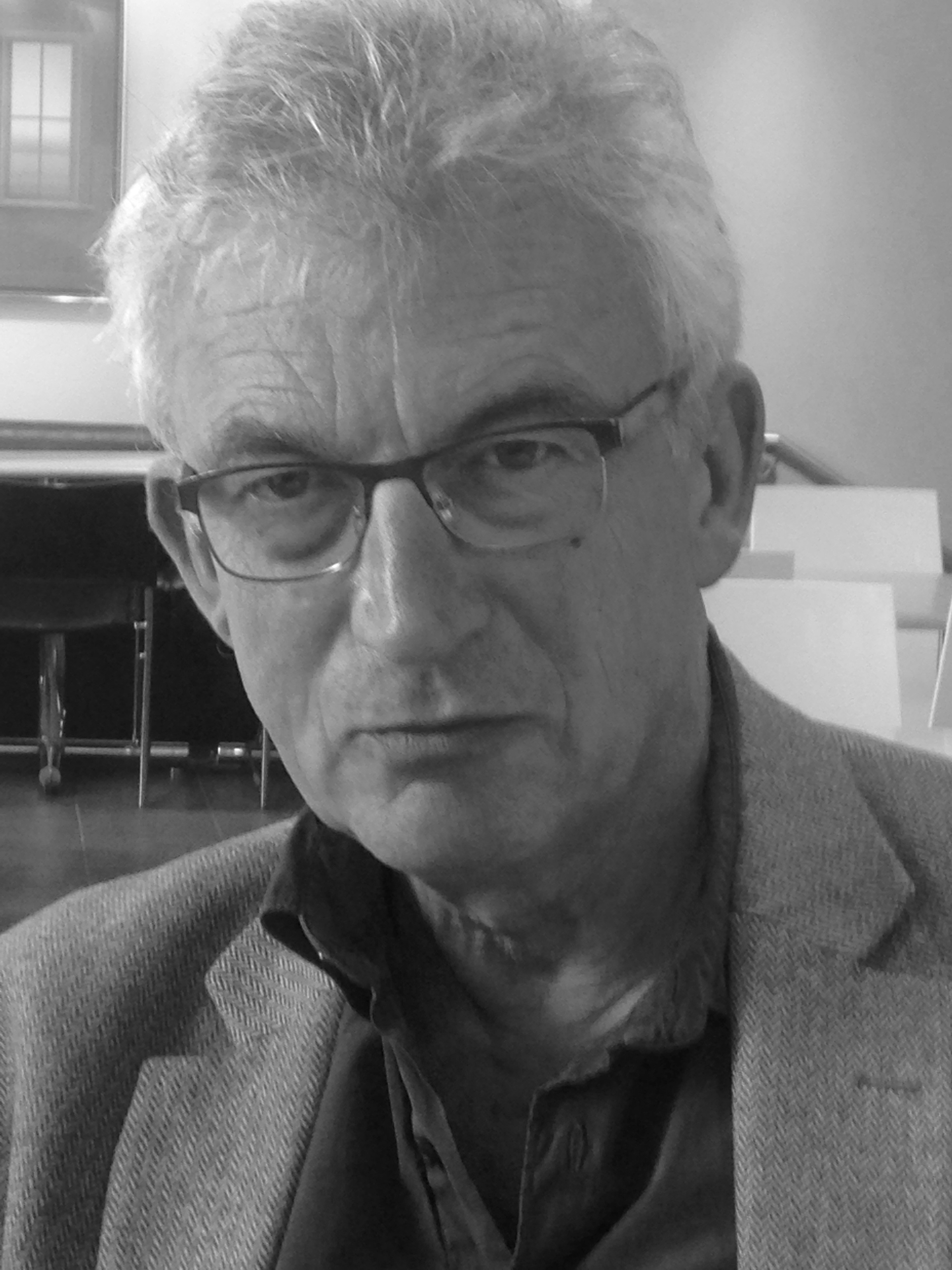

Jean-Michel Maulpoix was born on November 11, 1952, in Montbéliard, Doubs.

The author of more than twenty volumes of French poetry (in blank verse fragments and in prose) and of several volumes of essays and criticism, he teaches modern French literature at the University Paris X Nanterre and is the director of the quarterly literary journal Le Nouveau Recueil. He is an alumnus of the École normale supérieure de Saint-Cloud.
