= Chris Emery =

British poet and literary publisher

Chris Emery, also known as Chris Hamilton-Emery (born 23 November 1963), is a British poet and literary publisher.

== Biography ==
Emery was born and grew up in Manchester, England, and went to a convent-run primary school in New Moston before attending grammar school in Prestwich. It was following this that he began to study sculpture, painting and printmaking. He continued at Manchester College of Art and Design before taking a degree at Leeds Polytechnic, graduating in 1986. He subsequently destroyed all his art work, and began to focus upon his writing.

After a brief attempt to train as an art teacher, Emery began work in a variety of jobs: insurance clerk, an administrator in a haematology department, a data manager in an oncology department, an information designer in public transport, and design manager at the British Council, before embarking on a publishing career — ending up as a director at Cambridge University Press. He left to concentrate on writing and literary publishing in 2002.

Emery's poetry began appearing in journals throughout the 1990s including The Age, Jacket, Magma, Poetry London, Poetry Review, Poetry Wales, PN Review, Quid and The Rialto. He was anthologised in New Writing 8 in 1999. A pamphlet, The Cutting Room, was published by Barque in 2000. A first full-length poetry collection, Dr. Mephisto, was published by Arc in 2002. He has travelled to perform his work in the US and Australia. A second full-length collection of poetry, Radio Nostalgia, was published by Arc Publications in 2006. He was anthologised in Identity Parade: New British & Irish Poets (Bloodaxe, 2010), edited By Roddy Lumsden. Emery is a contributor to The Cambridge Companion to Creative Writing, edited by David Morley and Philip Neilsen (CUP, 2012). A third collection of poetry, The Departure, was published by Salt in 2012. His most recent collections are Modern Fog (Arc, 2024), and Wonder (Salt, 2025).

Emery's early poetry was characterised by a dystopian vision of the world, the use of varied personae, an exuberant vocabulary, black humour and dramatic changes in register and tone. His work can shift between mainstream poetics and wild experimentation, often combining both within a single volume. His central themes appear to be the incongruousness of moral experience within modern society, the collapse or eradication of identity, and both spiritual and secular redemption.

He is also the author of a writers’ guide on publishing and marketing poetry, 101 Ways to Make Poems Sell.

Working as Chris Hamilton-Emery, he is a Director of Salt Publishing an independent literary press based in Cromer, England. He was awarded an American Book Award in 2006 for his services to American literature. Hamilton-Emery has sat on the Boards of the Independent Publishers Guild and Planet Poetry, and occasionally works as a consultant in the publishing industry in the United Kingdom. He lives and works in Cromer.

== Bibliography ==
Poetry

- The Cutting Room (Barque Press, 2000)
- Dr. Mephisto (Arc Publications, 2002)
- Radio Nostalgia (Arc Publications, 2006)
- The Departure (Salt Publishing, 2012)
- Depth Charge (Salt Publishing, 2020)
- Modern Fog (Arc Publications, 2024)
- Wonder (Salt Publishing, 2025)

Non-fiction

- 101 Ways to Make Poems Sell (Salt Publishing, 2006)

As editor

- Poets in View: A Visual Anthology of 50 Classic Poems (Salt Publishing, 2008)
- Emily Brontë: The Visionary and Other Poems (Salt Publishing, 2009)
- John Keats: Ode to Psyche and Other Poems (Salt Publishing, 2009)
- Christina Rossetti: Goblin Market and Other Poems (Salt Publishing, 2009)
