= Claire Potter =

American historian

Claire Bond Potter is an American historian. She is a professor of history at The New School.

She is co-executive editor of the journal Public Seminar.

Potter received a BA from Yale University, where she studied English literature and worked for the Yale Daily News, and a PhD from New York University.

From 2006 to 2015, Potter wrote a blog called The Tenured Radical, hosted by The Chronicle of Higher Education from 2011 onward.

Her 2020 book Political Junkies was described in Publishers Weekly as "an illuminating rundown of historical trends in political journalism, from New Deal–era consensus building to today's super-partisan echo chambers".

== Books ==
- War on Crime: Bandits, G-Men and the Politics of Mass Culture (Rutgers University Press, 1998)
- with Renee Romano, Doing Recent History: On Privacy, Copyright, Video Games, Institutional Review Boards, Activist Scholarship, and History that Talks Back (University of Georgia Press, 2012)
- with Renee Romano Historians on Hamilton: How a Blockbuster Musical Restaged American History (Rutgers University Press: 2018)
- Political Junkies: From Talk Radio to Twitter, How Alternative Media Hooked Us on Politics and Broke Our Democracy (2020, Basic Books: ISBN 9781541644991)
