= Melissa Stein =

American poet

Melissa Stein is an American poet. She holds an MA in creative writing from the University of California, Davis and is a freelance editor and writer in San Francisco.

Her poetry collection Rough Honey won the 2010 APR/Honickman First Book Prize, selected by Mark Doty, and was published by American Poetry Review in association with Copper Canyon Press. Stein's second poetry collection Terrible blooms was published by Copper Canyon Press in 2018. Her work has appeared in Ploughshares, Tin House, Yale Review, New England Review, Best New Poets, Southern Review, Harvard Review, and many other journals and anthologies. She has received awards and fellowships from the National Endowment for the Arts, the Pushcart Prize, the Bread Loaf Writers’ Conference, Yaddo, the MacDowell Colony, and others.

Stein's work is lush and disturbing and often concerns her highly original take on nature or family history. Her stylish use of words is frequently in the service of creating moments of concentrated emotion or recollection.

== Selected works ==
=== Poetry ===
- ’’Rough Honey’’ (American Poetry Review and Copper Canyon Press, 2010)
- ’’Terrible blooms’’ (Copper Canyon Press, 2018)
