= Afzal Ahmed Syed =

Indian poet and translator

Afzal Ahmed Syed (افضال احمد سيد) is a contemporary Urdu poet and translator based in Pakistan, who is known for his mastery of both classical and modern Urdu poetic expression.

== Biography ==
Born in Ghazipur, British India, in 1946, Afzal Ahmed Syed has lived since 1976 in Karachi, Pakistan, where he worked as an entomologist until his retirement in 2005. He is the author of the modern nazm collections چھينی ہوئ تاريخ (An Arrogated Past, 1984), دو زبانوں ميں سزاۓ موت (Death Sentence in Two Languages, 1990), and روکوکو اور دوسری دنيائيں (Rococo and Other Worlds, 2000). Another collection of classical ghazals is titled خيمہُ سياہ (The Dark Pavilion, 1988).

Syed's poetry was anthologized in An Evening of Caged Beasts: Seven Postmodernist Urdu Poets (New York: OUP, 1999). The Wesleyan University Press Poetry Series has published a selection of Syed's poetry in translation, titled Rococo and Other Worlds in 2010, which features poetry from his three Urdu nazm collections.

Syed has translated a wide and important body of works by contemporary poets, playwrights, and novelists. He was one of the first Urdu translators of Gabriel García Márquez and Jean Genet. His work has been widely published in leading Urdu literary periodicals such as Shabkhoon, Aaj, and Dunyazad. He currently teaches at Habib University.

== Bibliography ==
=== Original works ===
==== In Urdu ====
- چھينی ہوئ تاريخ: نظميں - An Arrogated Past (Karachi: Aaj Ki Kitaben, 1984)
- خيمہُ سياہ: غزليات - The Dark Pavilion (Karachi: Aaj Ki Kitaben, 1988)
- دو زبانوں ميں سزاۓ موت: نظميں - Death Sentence in Two Languages (Karachi: Aaj Ki Kitaben, 1990)
- روکوکو اور دوسری دنيائيں : نظميں - Rococo and Other Worlds (Karachi: Aaj Ki Kitaben, 2000)

==== In English translation ====
- Rococo and Other Worlds: Selected Poetry of Afzal Ahmed Syed, Translated from Urdu by Musharraf Ali Farooqi

=== Translations by Afzal Ahmed Syed ===
==== Poetry ====
Miroslav Holub (Czech), Yehuda Amichai (Hebrew), Dunya Mikhail (Arabic), Tadeusz Borowski (Polish), Zbigniew Herbert (Polish), Jan Prokop (Polish), Tadeusz Rozewicz (Polish), Wisława Szymborska (Polish), Aleksander Wat (Polish), Marin Sorescu (Romanian), Osip Mandelstam (Russian), Orhan Veli (Turkish)

==== Fiction ====
Gabriel García Márquez, Chronicle of A Death Foretold.

==== Novels ====
Musharraf Ali Farooqi, Between Clay and Dust

==== Plays ====
Jean Genet, The Maids. Goran Stefanovski, Sarajevo: Tales from a City
