= Deborah Garrison =

American poet (born 1965)

Deborah Garrison (born 12 February 1965) is an American poet.

== Life ==
Garrison was born in Ann Arbor, Michigan. Her father, Joel Gotlieb, died when she was about 15, and she and her two sisters were raised by their mother Naomi Weisberg Harrison, an accountant. Garrison earned her bachelor's degree in creative writing from Brown University in 1986. She subsequently earned her master's degree in Literature from New York University. On August 10, 1986 she married attorney Mathew C. Garrison. Also in 1986, Garrison joined the staff of The New Yorker where she worked for the next fifteen years, starting on the editorial staff and ultimately becoming the senior non-fiction editor. She is now the poetry editor at Alfred A. Knopf and a senior editor at Pantheon Books. She was hired for Knopf by Sonny Mehta, president of the Knopf group, to replace publishing industry icon Harry Ford. Under Ford's direction, Knopf had become a prominent publisher of poetry. Mehta chose Garrison to fill Ford's shoes because "there was something so fresh about Deborah, and I admired her poetry." Garrison also edits fiction and nonfiction for Pantheon Books. Novelist Julia Glass, winner of the 2002 National Book Award calls Garrison an "incredible editor."

Garrison resides in Montclair, New Jersey with her husband and three children.

== Poetry ==
Garrison's first volume of poetry, A Working Girl Can't Win, was published in 1998. The poems in this volume focus on themes relating to the young female professional, friendship, love, grief and passion. Her second volume, The Second Child, published almost ten years after the first, deals mainly with themes related to motherhood. Reviews of Garrison's poetry have been mixed. Serious critics like one reviewer for Library Journal claim that "Garrison entertains, but shallowly." Similarly, William Logan of The New Criterion wrote, "It's not that these poems are bad, though they're bad enough; it's that they're not sure what poems should do." On the other hand, other critics are more positive in assessing her work. John Updike's comments are printed on the book jacket of Working Girl and reprinted liberally throughout book reviews. Of her poems he declares that, "with their short lines, sneaky rhymes, and casual leaps of metaphor, Garrison's poems have a Dickinsonian intensity and the American recluse's air of independent-minded, lightly populated singleness." Garrison is the first to acknowledge that her poetry would not be on Knopf's publication list and insists that her own poetry is not indicative either of her taste in poetry or in her breadth as an editor. However, her supporters suggest that the fact that her poetry is "accessible" and commercially successful (Working Girl sold over 30,000 copies) does not detract from its value. One critic warns that the reader should notice that "the accessibility of Garrison's free verse should not obscure the sound effects and subtle rhymes which give shape to the work...when the occasion calls for metaphor, Garrison is ready with appropriate responses." Any discussion of Garrison's work has led to a debate over whether poetry that is not obscure can be considered good. As a poet and an editor, Garrison expresses an interest in having more readers experience the enrichment that poetry can bring because, as she says, "most readers don't even know they need poetry." She also notes that, "Poetry can be pretentious sometimes, and if people feel poetry is this high citadel that you can't get into, it's bad for poetry."

== Books ==
- A Working Girl Can't Win Random House, 1998, ISBN 978-0-375-75540-8.
- The Second Child, Random House, 2007. ISBN 978-1-4000-6359-8.
