= Joseph Harrison (poet) =

American poet and editor (born 1957)

- Born: 1957 (age 68–69); Richmond, Virginia, U.S.
- Education: Yale University (BA); Johns Hopkins University (MA)
- Occupations: Poet; editor

Joseph Harrison (1957–2024) was an American poet and editor.

Harrison was born in Richmond, Virginia, and grew up there and in Alabama. He graduated from Yale University with a Bachelor of Arts degree in 1979, and from Johns Hopkins University with a Master of Arts degree in 1986. He was a Senior American Editor for Waywiser Press. He lived in Baltimore.

== Awards ==
- 2005 Academy Award in Literature from the American Academy of Arts and Letters
- 2009 Guggenheim Fellow

== Works ==
- Someone Else’s Name Zoo Press, 2003, ISBN 9781932023114; Waywiser Press, 2007 ISBN 978-1-904130-06-2
- Identity Theft, Waywiser Press, 2008, ISBN 978-1-904130-27-7
- Shakespeare's Horse, Waywiser Press, 2015.

=== Anthologies ===
- The Best American Poetry 1998, Editors John Hollander, David Lehman, Charles Scribner's Sons, 1998, ISBN 978-0-684-81453-7
- "Air Larry", 180 More Extraordinary Poems for Every Day, Editor Billy Collins, Random House, Inc., 2005, ISBN 978-0-8129-7296-2
- Poetry: a pocket anthology, Editor R. S. Gwynn, Longman, 2002, ISBN 978-0-321-08720-1
- The Swallow Anthology of New American Poets, Editor David Yezzi, Swallow Press, 2009, ISBN 978-0-8040-1121-1
