= Clive Newman =

Australian rules footballer

Personal information
- Full name: Clive Newman
- Born: 6 May 1949 (age 77)
- Original team: Deer Park
- Height: 189 cm (6 ft 2 in)
- Weight: 91 kg (201 lb)

Playing career^{1}
Years	Club	Games (Goals)
1970–71	Footscray	2 (0)
1971–76	Werribee (VFA)	42 (19)
- ^{1} Playing statistics correct to the end of 1971.

Clive Newman (born 6 May 1949) is a former Australian rules footballer who played with Footscray in the Victorian Football League (VFL).
