= R. M. Ryan =

American writer (born 1945)

R. M. Ryan (born 1945) is the author of Vaudeville in the Dark (2010), which was lauded by The New York Times as having been "written at the juncture of rapture and rupture". He is also the author of two other volumes of poetry from Louisiana State University Press and two novels, including a collection of poems and a personal meditation on surviving cancer called The Lost Roads Adventure Club (2017).

In 2015, Ryan published an autobiographical novel called There's a Man with a Gun Over There based on his experiences in the US Army as a detective and translator investigating black marketing in Germany during the Vietnam era. In this novel, Ryan, trained as poet and drafted into the military, is a kind of innocent abroad as he learns the very high price of essentially becoming a fascist for the American Empire and the remnants of Nazi Germany. Nominated by its publisher for both the Pulitzer Prize and the National Book Award, There's a Man with a Gun Over There is about what could happen to anyone in the US Army, and a cautionary tale about America's war machine. Publisher Martin Shepard describes the author as "the Norman Mailer of this generation". Poet, screenwriter, playwright, and MacArthur Fellow Naomi Wallace comments that in reading the novel she is astonished by "the battle of consciousness Ryan has with himself concerning right, wrong, war, lies: all are in continuous flux and deeply alive".

Carol Polsgrove, author of Divided Minds: Intellectuals and the Civil Rights Movement and professor emerita at the Indiana University School of Journalism, comments: "R. M. Ryan's poems are not for the faint of heart. They saunter, they soar, they dive down to despair. Vaudeville in the Dark brings together poems written over the last thirty years – since his publisher, Louisiana State University Press, brought out his first volume in 1980. That was right after he abandoned graduate school for stockbroking, which he has now abandoned for a writer's life."

In an introduction of Ryan for a reading at Marquette University, professor and novelist C. J. Hribal said, "Rick – R. M. – Ryan has quietly been writing some of the best poems of the new century: elegiac comedies, hymns to memory and to the small, incidental moments of our pasts that connect us to who we are now ... these poems are generous in their humor and their sadness, they are wise and wounded, they are intensely human and humane."

For six years, Ryan was the lyricist for the northern California rock-and-roll band the Thugz and wrote many of the songs on their two CDs released by Puffin records: Goin' To Town (2009) and Peace of Mind (2011).

Ryan also founded Firestarter Press, which has published eccentric artifacts by writers including Abby Frucht, Mark Strand, Tobias Wolff, Fred Chappell, and John Koethe.

Ryan received his undergraduate degree in English at Cornell College, where he studied with Robert Dana, and his master's in poetry from the University of Arkansas; he continued graduate studies (ABD) at Washington University in St. Louis with Howard Nemerov and John N. Morris, and later had a career as a writer and financial advisor for a brokerage company in Milwaukee, Wisconsin. He is married to the biographer Carol Sklenicka, author of Raymond Carver: A Writer's Life. He lives near the Sonoma Coast in California.

== Bibliography ==
Goldilocks in Later Life. Baton Rouge: Louisiana State University Press, 1980.

The Golden Rules. New York: Four Walls Eight Windows, 2002.

Vaudeville in the Dark. Baton Rouge: Louisiana State University Press, 2010.

There's a Man with a Gun Over There. Sag Harbor: Permanent Press, 2015.

The Lost Roads Adventure Club. Baton Rouge: Louisiana State University Press, 2017.
