= Demi-sonnet =

Poetic form

A demi-sonnet is a poetic form. Demi-sonnets include seven lines of varying length and tend to be aphoristic in nature. Each poem ends with an internal full or slant rhyme.

== Etymology ==
The name comes from the fact that the form is half the length of a traditional 14-line sonnet.
