= Patti Smith Complete =

1998 lyrics collection by Patti Smith

- Author: Patti Smith
- Language: English
- Genre: Song book
- Publisher: Doubleday
- Publication date: 1998
- Publication place: United States
- Media type: Hardcover, Paperback
- Pages: 272
- ISBN: 978-0-385-49079-5
- OCLC: 38966223
- Dewey Decimal: 782.42166/0268 21
- LC Class: ML54.6.S64 P38 1998

Patti Smith Complete is a lyrics collection by Patti Smith, originally published in 1998.

== Notes ==
- Theroux A. Patti Smith complete (Book Review) (Undetermined). Review of Contemporary Fiction. 1999;19(2):129-130. Accessed July 30, 2025. https://search.ebscohost.com/login.aspx?direct=true&db=hft&AN=509957925&lang=ru&site=eds-live&scope=site
