= Siobhan Campbell =

Irish poet and critic

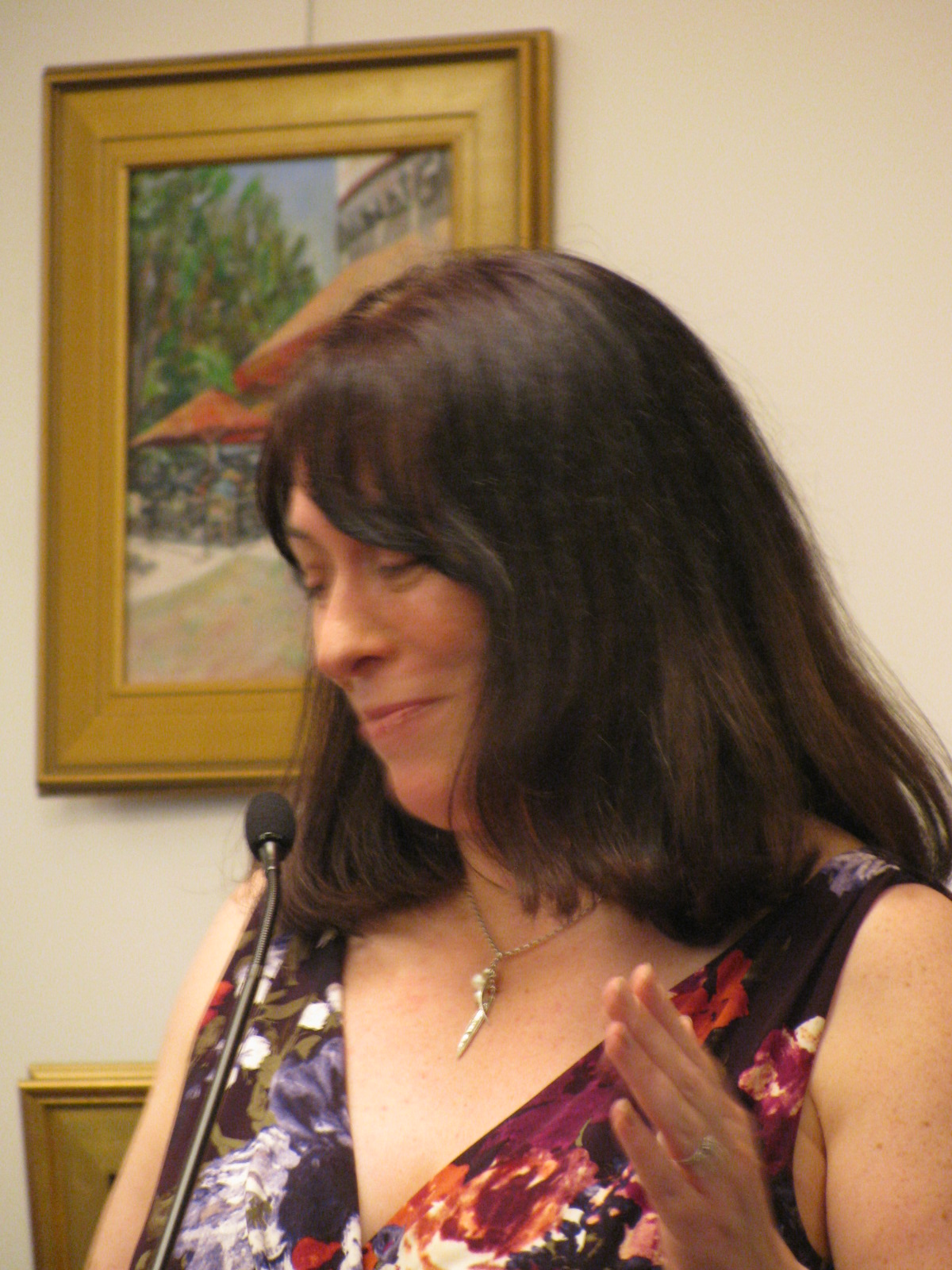
- Born: 1962 (age 63–64); Dublin, Ireland
- Education: University College Dublin; Lancaster University; New York University (NYU); New School for Social Research
- Occupations: Poet, critic, academic
- Employer: The Open University
- Writing career
- Notable work: Six poetry collections

Siobhan Campbell (born 1962) is an Irish poet and critic. She is the author of six poetry collections. Campbell has developed creative writing workshops for military veterans as well as story-gathering protocols for work with refugees. Her recent research into creative writing as social practice has led her to work with patients in palliative care. Educated at University College Dublin and at Lancaster University, Campbell also pursued post-graduate study at NYU and the New School, New York City. Campbell is on faculty at The Open University, Dept. of English.

== Books ==
- 2017: Heat Signature (Seren Press)
- 2010: Cross-Talk (Bridgend: Seren Books)
- 2009: Darwin Among the Machines (Wales: Rack Press)
- 2008: That Water Speaks in Tongues (Derbyshire: Templar Poetry) Winner of the Templar Award for Poetry, Shortlist: Michael Marks Poetry Award
- 2000: The Cold that Burns (Blackstaff Press/Dufour Editions)
- 1997, 1996: The Permanent Wave, (Blackstaff Press/ Dufour Editions)

== Edited Collections ==
- 2016: Inside History: the work of Eavan Boland (co-editor with Dr. Nessa O’Mahony) (Arlen House/ Syracuse University Press)
- 2014: Mapping Jabal Al Natheef (contributor) Academica.edu/Heinrich Böll Foundation
- 2012: Courage and Strength: Stories and Poems by Combat Veterans, KUP/ Combat Stress UK
- 2011: Forces Stories and Poems, SSAFA (Soldiers, Sailors, Airmen Family Association) /KUP

== Honours and awards ==
Awards received in the following:

- Winner, 'Poem of the Year' at the Irish Book Awards for the poem, '"Longboat at Portaferry"
- Winner, O' Bheal poetry competition 2017
- Winner of the Oxford Brookes International Poetry Award 2016
- Commissioned poem in honour of Gwendolyn Brooks in The Golden Shovel Anthology: In Honour of Gwendolyn Brooks (University of Arkansas Press, 2016)
- Commissioned poem in response to Ovid's Metamorphosis on his 2000th anniversary in Metamorphic: 21st Century Poets respond to Ovid (Recent Work Press, 2016)
- Forward Book of Poetry selection by Forward Prize Judges 2011
- Wigtown International Poetry Competition (judge: Robert Crawford) 2010
- Troubadour International Poetry Contest (judges: David Constantine and Helen Dunmore) 2008 (reading at the prize-giving, Troubadour poetry venue, London)
- Gregory O’Donoghue memorial competition 2010
- Mslexia open poetry competition (judge: Carol Ann Duffy) 2009 ‘The Ripening of an R.U.C. man’
- Templar Poetry Competition Winner 2009
- Southword International Poetry Competition for ‘Clew Bay from the Reek’
- National Poetry Competition 2005

Manuscripts related to That Water Speaks in Tongues have been acquired by the British Library to be archived for their Modern British Collections.

== Links ==
- Books by Siobhan Campbell at Amazon.com
- Profile at the Poetry Foundation
- http://www.serenbooks.com/author/siobhan-campbell
- http://www.troublesarchive.com/artists/siobhan-campbell
- http://www.open.ac.uk/people/sc32475
- https://web.archive.org/web/20150217184403/http://aboutplacejournal.org/peaks-valleys-2/section-4.../siobhan-campbell
- http://www.munsterlit.ie/Southword/Issues/17A/Poetry/campbell_siobhan.html
- http://www.jstor.org/stable/41583376
- http://www.connotationpress.com/...poetry.../1859-siobhan-campbell-poetry
- http://www.pnreview.co.uk/cgi-bin/scribe?item_id=8149
- https://annexemagazine.wordpress.com
- http://results.ref.ac.uk/DownloadFile/ImpactCaseStudy/pdf?caseStudyId
- http://www.academia.edu/9647420/Mapping_Jabal_Al_Natheef
