= Lloyd Searwar =

- Born: July 28, 1925
- Died: April 2, 2006 (aged 80)
- Occupation: Diplomat

Lloyd Searwar (July 28, 1925 – April 2, 2006) was a career Guyanese diplomat, and later the Director of the Foreign Service Institute in Guyana.

In 1998 Peepal Tree Press published his anthology, They Came in Ships: an Anthology of Indo-Guyanese Writing.
