= Salt Publishing =

English publisher

- Predecessor: Salt Magazine
- Founded: 1999
- Founder: John Kinsella, Clive Newman, and Chris Hamilton-Emery
- Headquarters location: Cromer, Norfolk, England, UK
- Distribution: Penguin Random House Publisher Services (UK); Ingram Content Group (US)
- Publication types: Fiction, poetry, non-fiction, online magazine
- Imprints: House Magazine
- Owners: Chris Hamilton-Emery and Jen Hamilton-Emery
- Official website: www.saltpublishing.com

Salt Publishing is an independent publisher based in Norfolk, England. Its origins date back to 1990, with the launch of Salt Magazine (later Salt: An International Journal of Poetry and Poetics) in Australia by Australian poet John Kinsella. The publishing house was established in 1999, and moved to the UK around 2004. It started awarding the Crashaw Prize in 2008, for new poets to have their debut collection published internationally.

== History ==
In 1990, Australian poet John Kinsella launched Salt Magazine in Western Australia. This was later renamed Salt: An International Journal of Poetry and Poetics. From November 2000, Salt was published in affiliation with Westerly; Salt was published in the first half of the year, covering European and American literature, while Westerly, published each November, covered Asian and Australian literature. Some individual issues also had a distinctive title, and Volumes 5, 6, and 7 were issued as separate monograph titled A Salt Reader. Salt ceased publication around 2003.

Over the next decade, Kinsella, together with Tracy Ryan, went on to develop Folio(Salt), publishing and co-publishing books and chapbooks focused on a pluralist vision of contemporary poetry.

In 1999 Salt Publishing was established by John Kinsella, Clive Newman, and Chris Hamilton-Emery.

When Newman left in 2002 and the original partnership was dissolved, Jen Hamilton-Emery joined Chris Hamilton-Emery to take over the ownership of Salt, relaunching the business in the UK. In November 2004, Salt was incorporated in the UK and Linda Bennett joined as director. In July 2005, John Skelton joined as a director. As of 2008, Chris Hamilton-Emery was still publishing director.

Salt Publishing awarded the Crashaw Prize, named in honour of 17th-century metaphysical poet Richard Crashaw, from 2008 until at least 2013. The prize gave the opportunity for debut poets to have their first collections of poetry published in Australia, the UK, and the US.

== Recognition and awards ==
Chris Hamilton-Emery was given an editor's award for excellence in literature in the 2006 American Book Awards.

In 2007 Salt was shortlisted for an innovation award in the inaugural UK Independent Publishing Awards, though Faber & Faber won the category.

In 2008 Salt was shortlisted again for the 2008 Nielsen Innovation of the Year award, and won it.

== Today ==
As of June 2026 Salt is based in Cromer on the north Norfolk coast. It does not have a physical office. It publishes fiction, non-fiction, poetry, short stories, and House Magazine.

Christopher Hamilton-Emery is editor-in-chief of House Magazine, while Jennifer Hamilton-Emery is managing editor.
