= Kona Macphee =

British poet (born 1969)

- Born: 1969 (age 56–57); London
- Education: Sydney Conservatorium of Music, University of Cambridge
- Occupations: Poet, media producer, RLF fellow
- Writing career
- Notable work: Perfect Blue
- Notable awards: Eric Gregory Award; Geoffrey Faber Memorial Prize
- Website: Official website

Kona Macphee is a British poet. She has published three poetry collections: Tails, Perfect Blue and What Long Miles, the latter having been described as "driven by a poetic sensibility both captivated by nuance and ever in search of essence". She is the recipient of an Eric Gregory Award, the Geoffrey Faber Memorial Prize, and was named the poetry book of the month for July 2013 by The Observer.

== Biography ==
Kona Macphee was born in London in 1969. She grew up in Melbourne, Australia, and studied musical composition at the Sydney Conservatorium of Music. She also studied violin at the University of Sydney, and computer science at Monash University. She later earned an M.Sc. at Cambridge University as a Commonwealth Scholar.

Macphee was awarded a year-long Royal Literary Fund fellowship to the University of Stirling from 2012 to 2013, working with staff and students to improve their expository writing, and she has since provided technical and editorial services for a variety of Royal Literary Fund projects. She has worked across a range of job types, often doing so alongside the writing and publishing of her own poetry with Bloodaxe Books; these jobs have included web editor and developer, but also motorcycle mechanic and media producer.

Macphee's first full-length poetry collection, Tails, was published in 2004 by Bloodaxe Books; her second collection, Perfect Blue (also with Bloodaxe Books), was published in 2010. Perfect Blue was the recipient of the Geoffrey Faber Memorial Prize in 2010. Her third poetry collection, What Long Miles (Bloodaxe Books), published in 2013, was named The Observer's poetry book of the month for July 2013. Her poetry publications have generally been very well received by reviewers, and her approach to poetic composition has been described as having “unequivocably its roots in experience”.

Macphee has taught poetry classes for various organizations including the Poetry Society, the Poetry School, the Arvon Foundation, and the Scottish Poetry Library. She currently lives in Perthshire and works in media production. She is also credited with being the founder of the Muse Tuners creative mentoring agency.

== Poetry collections ==
- Tails, Bloodaxe Books (2004).
- Perfect Blue, Bloodaxe Books (2010).
- What Long Miles, Bloodaxe Books (2013).

== Awards ==
- (1998) Eric Gregory Award
- (2010) Geoffrey Faber Memorial Prize

== Kona Macphee: External links ==
- Kona Macphee author page at Bloodaxe Books (archived here with Wayback, 27 November 2022)
- Kona Macphee at the Scottish Poetry Library (archived here with Wayback, 28 December 2024)
- Kona Macphee at the Royal Literary Fund (archived here with Wayback, 28 May 2024)
- Kona Macphee profile at WritersMosaic online (from the Royal Literary Fund) (archived here with Wayback, 15 August 2024)
- Kona Macphee official website (archived here on Wayback, 7 February 2025)
