= Kynpham Sing Nongkynrih =

Indian poet, novelist and writer

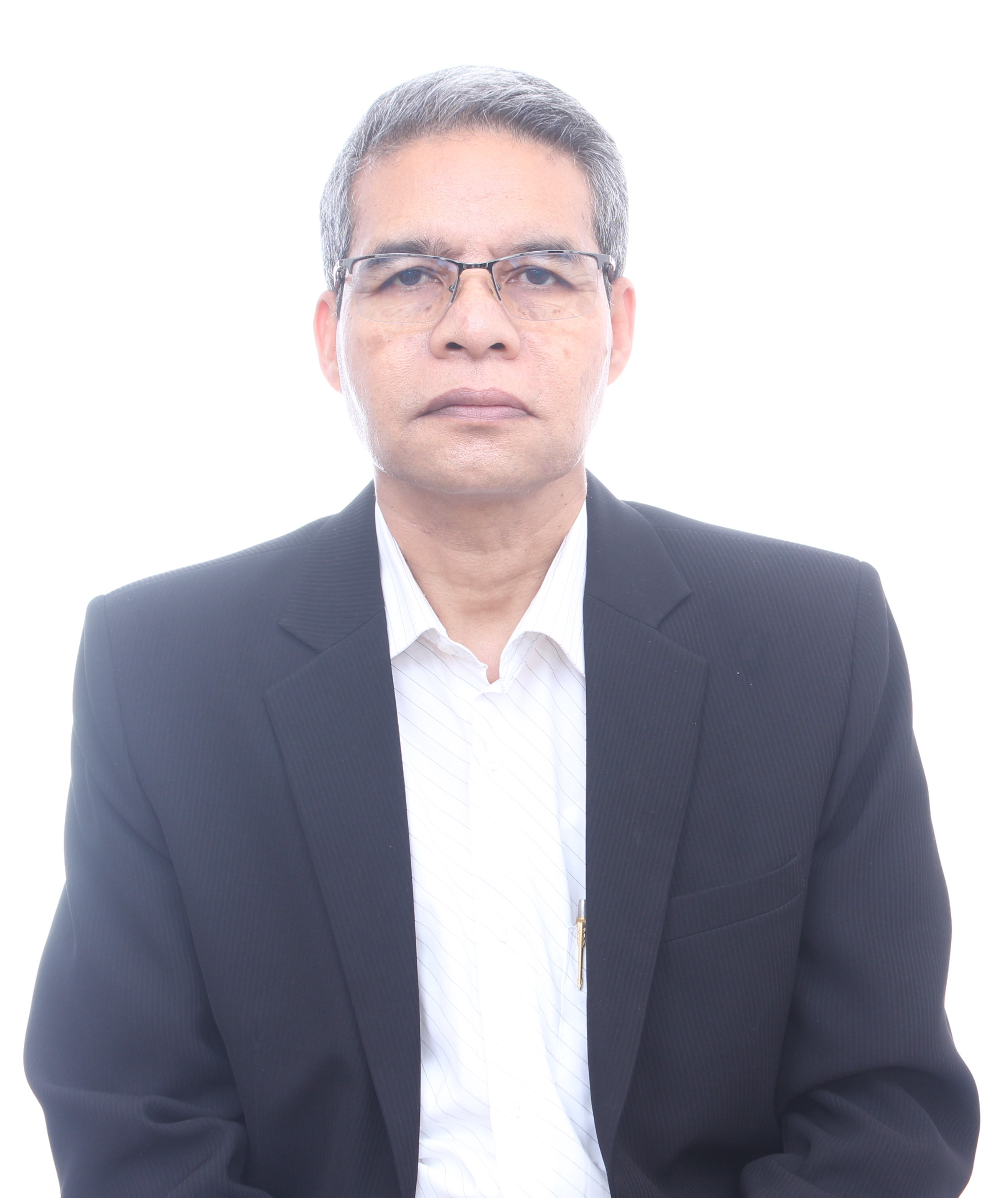
- Born: 4 April 1964 (age 62)
- Occupations: Poet, novelist, writer
- Writing career
- Language: Khasi, English
- Notable works: Funeral Nights; The Distaste of the Earth; The Yearning of Seeds; Time's Barter: Haiku and Senryu; Around the Hearth; Lapbah: Stories from the North-East; Late-Blooming Cherries: Haiku Poetry from India; Dancing Earth: An Anthology of Poetry from North-East India

Kynpham Sing Nongkynrih (born 4 April 1964) is an Indian poet, novelist and writer. Born and brought up in Sohra (aka Cherrapunjee) but living in Shillong, he writes in two languages: Khasi and English.

He is a faculty member at North-Eastern Hill University in Shillong, India. His most notable work is the 1024-page epic novel Funeral Nights (2021), which won the Professor Tabu Ram Taid Literary Award 2026. He was awarded the Shakti Bhatt Prize in 2024 for his body of work.

== Reception ==
The Guardian called Nongkynrih's novel Funeral Nights "an enchanting and revealing epic ensemble", adding that "reading it feels like being exposed to the warmth of the fire, listening in on an honest conversation between friends."

The Conversation Australia nominated his second novel,The Distaste of the Earth, as one of the Best Books of 2024 and praised its "Aesop-like vision of our contemporary moment" and described it as "Part poetry, part philosophy and part critique".

== Works ==
His fictional works in English and Khasi include Funeral Nights (2021), The Distaste of the Earth (2024), Around the Hearth: Khasi Legends (2007), U Sier Lapalang: A Khasi Tale (2005) and Ki Kyrwoh: Ki Khana Phawer (A Collection of Moral Stories) (2015)

His plays in English and Khasi include Manik, A Play in Five Acts (2018), Ki Miet ka Jingtriem: Ka Sawangka ha ki Lai Bynta (2011) and Ka Jingngiew Ka Mynsiem Briew: Ka Sawangka ha ki Lai Bynta (2022) | Manik was published in Hindi by Setu Prakashan as Manik Raitong: Paanch Akt ke Natak (2023) His Khasi play Ki Miet ka Jingtriem (Nights of Terror) was adapted into a film and serialised by Doordarshan Kendra Shillong (2020)

Among his poetry collections in English and Khasi are Moments (1992), The Sieve: Love Poems (1992), The Yearning of Seeds (2011), Time's Barter: Haiku and Senryu (2015), Ka Samoi jong ka Lyer (The Season of the Wind) (2002), Ki Mawsiang ka Sohra (The Ancient Rocks of Cherra) (2002), Ki Jingkynmaw (Remembrances) (2002) and Ka Jingshai ha ka Miet (Light in the Night) (2023) |The Yearning of Seeds was translated into Bengali as Jibanta Shikarer Setu by the Translation Department of Calcutta University (Calcutta University, 2023)

He also has several nonfictional works in English and Khasi, including Hiraeth and the Poetry of Soso Tham: A Study of the Great Unconventional Elegy and the Poetry of the Khasi National Bard (2011), Ban Sngewthuh ia ka Poitri (Understanding Poetry) (1998) and Ka Pyrkhat Niam ki Khanatang (Sacred Myths and the Religious Content) (2011)

His most notable coedited works are Anthology of Contemporary Poetry from the Northeast (2003), Dancing Earth: An Anthology of Poetry from North-East India (2009), Late-Blooming Cherries: Haiku Poetry from India (2024) and Lapbah: Stories from the Northeast (Vols I & II, 2025)

Nigel Jenkins described his poetry as 'an exuberant, liberating, "sad and happy" conflation of social satirist, political sleuth and whistle-blower, hymnist of embattled nature, love poet and people's remembrancer.'

== Awards ==
- Veer Shankar Shah Raghunath Shah National Tribal Award (From the Madhya Pradesh Government, 2008)
- The Bangalore Review June Jazz Award (2021)
- SPARROW Literary Award (2022)
- Shakti Bhatt Prize (2024)
- Meghalaya State Literary Award/ U Tirot Sing Award for Arts and Literature (2026)
