= Australian Book Review =

Literary magazine

- Editor: Georgina Arnott
- Former editors: Peter Rose
- Frequency: Eleven times a year (January–February is a double issue)
- First issue: 1961
- Country: Australia
- Based in: Southbank, Victoria, Australia
- Language: English
- Website: www.australianbookreview.com.au
- ISSN: 0155-2864

Australian Book Review is an Australian arts and literary review. Created in 1961, ABR is an independent non-profit organisation that publishes articles, reviews, commentaries, essays, and new writing. The aims of the magazine are "to foster high critical standards, to provide an outlet for fine new writing, and to contribute to the preservation of literary values and a full appreciation of Australia's literary heritage".

== History and profile ==
Australian Book Review was established by Max Harris and Rosemary Wighton as a monthly journal in Adelaide, Australia, in 1961. In 1971 production was reduced to quarterly releases, and lapsed completely in 1974. In 1978 the journal was revived by the National Book Council and, moving to Melbourne, began producing ten issues per year. ABR published the 400th issue of the second series in April 2018. An eleventh issue was added in 2021 (the magazine publishes a double issue in January–February).

ABR is currently in partnership with Monash University and had a previous partnership with Flinders University. The magazine is supported by various organisations including the Creative Australia, Arts SA, City of Melbourne Creative Spaces, and Copyright Agency Limited.

ABR publishes reviews, essays, commentaries, interviews and new creative writing. The magazine is national in readership, authorship, distribution, events and partners. It is available in print and online.

ABR’s diverse programs include three prestigious international prizes, writers’ fellowships worth as much as $10,000, themed issues, national events, cultural tours, and paid editorial internships/cadetships.

Georgina Arnott is the Editor; and Sarah Holland-Batt is Chairperson of the Board.

=== Editors ===
- 1961–1974: Geoffrey Dutton, Max Harris and Rosemary Wighton
- 1978–1986: John McLaren
- 1986–1987: Kerryn Goldsworthy
- 1988: Louise Adler
- 1989–1995: Rosemary Sorensen
- 1995–2000: Helen Daniel
- 2001–2025: Peter Rose
- 2025-present: Georgina Arnott

== Calibre Essay Prize ==
The Calibre Essay Prize is given annually since 2007. The prize, first awarded in 2007, is currently worth a total of A$10,000.

The prize is open to authors around the world writing in English. ABR accepts entries from published authors commentators, and emerging writers. All non-fiction subjects are eligible.

=== Winners ===
- 2007 – Elisabeth Holdsworth: An die Nachgenborenen: For Those Who Come After
- 2008 – Rachel Robertson: Reaching One Thousand and Mark Tredinnick: A Storm and a Teacup
- 2009 – Kevin Brophy: "What're yer looking at yer fuckin' dog": Violence and Fear in Žižek's Post-political Neighbourhood and Jane Goodall: Footprints
- 2010 – Lorna Hallahan: On being Odd and David Hansen: Seeing Truganini
- 2011 – Dean Biron: The Death of the Writer and Moira McKinnon: Who Killed Matilda?
- 2012 – Matt Rubinstein: Body and Soul: Copyright and Law Enforcement in the Age of the Electronic Book
- 2013 – Martin Thomas: "Because it's your country": Bringing Back the Bones to West Arnhem Land
- 2014 – Christine Piper: Unearthing the past
- 2015 – Sophie Cunningham: Staying with the trouble
- 2016 – Michael Winkler: The Great Red Whale
- 2017 – Michael Adams: Salt Blood
- 2018 – Lucas Grainger-Brown: We Three Hundred
- 2019 – Grace Karskens: Nah Doongh's Song
- 2020 – Yves Rees: Reading the Mess Backwards
- 2021 – Theodore Ell: Façades of Lebanon
- 2022 – Simon Tedeschi: This Woman My Grandmother
- 2023 – Tracy Ellis: Flow States

== Peter Porter Poetry Prize ==
Australian Book Review established its annual Poetry Prize in 2005, and in 2011 renamed it the Peter Porter Poetry Prize in memory of the Australian poet Peter Porter (1929–2010). The Prize is one of Australia's most lucrative awards for poetry. Winning and short-listed entries are published in ABR. Judith Bishop and Anthony Lawrence are the only poets to win the prize twice. The prize is open to poets around the world writing in English.

Entrants can submit a single poem of no more than 75 lines. Multiple entries are permitted, and all poems are judged anonymously.

=== Winners ===
- 2005 – Stephen Edgar: Man on the Moon
- 2006 – Judith Bishop: Still Life with Cockles and Shells
- 2007 – Alex Skovron:Sanctum
- 2008 – Ross Clark: Danger: Lantana
- 2009 – Tracy Ryan: Lost Property
- 2010 – Anthony Lawrence: Domestic Emergencies
- 2011 – Judith Bishop: 'Openings' and Tony Lintermans: Self-portrait at Sixty
- 2012 – Michael Farrell: Beautiful Mother
- 2013 – John A. Scott: Four Sonnets
- 2014 – Jessica L. Wilkinson: Arrival Platform Humlet
- 2015 – Judith Beveridge: As Wasps Fly Upwards
- 2016 – Amanda Joy: Tailings
- 2017 – Louis Klee: Sentence to Lilacs and Damen O'Brien: pH
- 2018 – Nicholas Wong: 101, Taipei
- 2019 – Andy Kissane: Searching the Dead and Belle Ling: 63 Temple Street, Mong Kok
- 2020 – A. Frances Johnson: My Father's Thesaurus
- 2021 – Sara M. Saleh: A Poetics of Fo(u)rgetting
- 2022 – Anthony Lawrence: In the Shadows of Our Heads
- 2023 – Dan Disney: periferal, fantasmal
- 2024 – Dan Hogan: Workarounds

== ABR Elizabeth Jolley Short Story Prize ==
Australian Book Review revived its annual short story competition in 2010, and in 2011 renamed it the ABR Elizabeth Jolley Short Story Prize in memory of the late Australian writer, Elizabeth Jolley (1923–2007). The total prize money is now $12,500. The prize is open to authors around the world writing in English.

=== Winners ===
- 2010 – Maria Takolander: A Roānkin Philosophy of Poetry
- 2011 – Carrie Tiffany: Before He Left the Family and Gregory Day: The Neighbour's Beans
- 2012 – Sue Hurley: Patterns in Nature
- 2013 – Michelle Michau-Crawford: Leaving Elvis
- 2014 – Jennifer Down: Aokigahara
- 2015 – Rob Magnuson Smith: The Elector of Nossnearly
- 2016 – Josephine Rowe: Glisk
- 2017 – Eliza Robertson: Pheidippides
- 2018 – Madelaine Lucas: Ruin
- 2019 – Sonja Dechian: The Point-Blank Murder
- 2020 – Mykaela Saunders: River Story
- 2021 – Camilla Chaudhary: The Enemy, Asyndeton
- 2022 – Tracy Ellis: Natural Wonder
- 2023 – Rowan Heath: The Mannequin

== ABR Arts ==
In 2012, Australian Book Review launched an extension of its coverage of Australian culture, Arts Update, now known as ABR Arts. It presents reviews of film and television, plays, operas, concerts, dance, and art exhibitions.

== Podcasts ==
In 2015, Australian Book Review launched two podcasts: Poem of the Week and The ABR Podcast. The ABR Podcast was subsequently revived in 2020. Poem of the Week was discontinued in September 2016.

== Fellowships ==
ABR's Fellowship program began in 2011. Funded by ABR's Patrons and by philanthropic foundations, the Fellowship program is intended to reward Australian writers. Most ABR Fellowships are now worth $10,000. The Fellowship program was originally intended for the creation of a single piece of long-form journalism but since 2018 (starting with Beejay Silcox's ABR Fortieth Birthday Fellowship) Fellows have written and published several long articles over the course of twelve months.

=== Fellowships ===
- Patrick Allington: "What is Australia, anyway?" The glorious limitations of the Miles Franklin Literary Award
- Rachel Buchanan: Sweeping Up the Ashes
- Felicity Plunkett: Sound Bridges: A Profile of Gurrumul
- Jennifer Lindsay: Man on the Margins
- Ruth Starke: Media Don: A political enigma in pink shorts
- Kerryn Goldsworthy: Everyone's a Critic
- Helen Ennis: Olive Cotton at Spring Forest: The modernist photographer at Spring Forest
- Arthur Fuhrmann: Patrick White: A theatre of his own
- Danielle Clode: Seeing the wood for the trees
- James McNamara: The Golden Age of Television?
- Shannon Burns: The scientist of his own experience: A Profile of Gerald Murnane
- Ashley Hay: The forest at the edge of time
- Michael Aiken: extract from Satan Repentant
- Alan Atkinson: How Do We Live With Ourselves? The Australian National Conscience
- Philip Jones: Beyond Songlines
- Stephen Orr: Ambassadors from Another Time
- Elisabeth Holdsworth: If This Is A Jew
- Marguerite Johnson: "Picnic at Hanging Rock" fifty years on
- Beejay Silcox (ABR Fortieth Birthday Fellow): We are all MFAs now!, The art of pain: Writing in the age of trauma, and This is the way the world ends
- Felicity Plunkett: A mutinous and ferocious grace: Nick Cave and trauma's aftermath, review of The Weekend by Charlotte Wood, and a review of Summer by Ali Smith
- Hessom Razavi (ABR Behrouz Boochani Fellowship): Notes on a Pandemic: How society has responded to Covid-19, Failures of imagination: A journey from Tehran's prisons to Australia's immigration detention centres, and The split state: Australia's binary myth about people seeking asylum

== Rising Stars ==
The Rising Stars program was established in 2019. The program is intended to encourage younger writers, enhancing their critical practice and advancing their careers.

== ABR Laureates ==
The ABR Laureateship was inaugurated in 2014, with the naming of David Malouf as laureate. The laureateship was not only created to commemorate Australia's finest writers, but also to 'advance the work of a younger writer admired by the Laureate.' Each ABR Laureate nominates an ABR Laureate Fellow for mentorship with the Editor of the ABR, in preparation for the publication of a substantial work within the magazine.

=== ABR Laureates ===
- 2014: David Malouf
- 2016: Robyn Archer
- 2023: Sheila Fitzpatrick
