= George Palmer (composer) =

Australian classical music composer and jurist

The Honourable George Palmer AM, KC

Justice of the Supreme Court of New South Wales
- In office 2001–2011

Personal details
- Born: 1947 (age 78–79) Egypt
- Occupation: Composer; jurist; barrister

George Alfred Palmer AM, KC (born 1947) is an Australian classical music composer and a former Justice of the Supreme Court of New South Wales.

== Early life and education ==
Palmer was born in a British military hospital in Egypt in 1947 while his parents, recently demobilised from the British Army, were awaiting a ship to take them to a new life in Australia. Palmer's family arrived in Sydney when he was three months old and he has lived there ever since.

He received a Jesuit education at Saint Ignatius' College, Riverview, with particular emphasis on the Classics, languages and history. He graduated in Arts and Law from University of Sydney in 1970.

Palmer studied piano from the age of 10. His most influential teachers were pianists Frank Warbrick and Neta Maughan.

Palmer's interests always lay in composition rather than performance, and he began writing music at an early age.

== Law career ==
After graduating, Palmer joined a city law firm where he specialised in commercial law. He developed expertise in oil and mineral exploration law at a time when the resources boom was just beginning in Australia. Within two years of graduation, he became a partner of his law firm.

He became a barrister in 1974, again specialising in commercial law, and built up a successful practice. He was appointed a Queen's Counsel in 1986 and appeared throughout Australia as leading counsel in many of the large commercial cases in the 1990s. In 2001, he was appointed a judge of the Supreme Court of New South Wales.

In June 2011, Palmer retired from the court to devote himself full-time to composition.

== Music career ==
In 2002, when it became clear that his father did not have long to live, Palmer recorded privately some of his works so that his father could hear his music. By coincidence the recordings came to the attention of the Australian Broadcasting Corporation (ABC).

In 2004, ABC Classic FM broadcast live a concert of his music at the Eugene Goossens Hall in Sydney and ABC TV later that year featured him in Australian Story.

Since then, ABC Classics has released CDs of his music. Attraction of Opposites (2005) features music for strings. Exaltate Dominum (2007), with Cantillation and Sinfonia Australis, conducted by Paul Stanhope, includes his Christmas Mass A Child Is Born, Three Psalms, The Canticles of Advent and other works for choir and soloists.

Palmer has received many commissions. His works include: a string quintet, Not Going Quietly, premiered by the Sydney Omega Ensemble in 2007; Concerto for Two Clarinets and Chamber Orchestra, performed by Dimitri Ashkenazy, David Rowden and the Sydney Omega Ensemble; Concertino for Two Guitars for Slava and Leonard Grigoryan and The Queensland Orchestra; a symphonic suite, The Beancounter, for the West Australian Youth Orchestra; a symphonic fantasia, Incandescence, for the Christchurch Symphony Orchestra conducted by Tom Woods; a song cycle for baritone and piano, Letters from a Black Snake, commissioned for the opening of the Sidney Nolan Retrospective at the Art Gallery of New South Wales and the National Gallery of Victoria; a piano quartet, The Way It Is, for the Seraphim Trio, a clarinet sonata, Black, White and a Little Blue, premiered in the Utzon Room at the Sydney Opera House by David Rowden in 2010. His works have been performed by orchestras and chamber groups in Australia, the United States, and Europe, and receive frequent airplay on classical music stations.

In July 2007, Palmer was commissioned to write the Papal Mass for World Youth Day 2008 in Sydney. The Mass, Benedictus Qui Venit, for large choir, soloists and orchestra, was performed in the presence of Pope Benedict XVI and an audience of 350,000 with soloists Amelia Farrugia, soprano, and Andrew Goodwin, tenor, directed by Benjamin Bayl.

In May 2016 his operatic adaptation of Tim Winton's novel Cloudstreet was premiered in Adelaide by the State Opera of South Australia. Hailed as "a resounding triumph" (The Australian) and "an extra-ordinary achievement" (Stagenoise), it played to critical acclaim and full houses. Palmer collaborated with Leah Purcell on the adaptation of her play based on Henry Lawson's short story "The Drover's Wife" into an opera, part of the 2026 opening program of the Queensland Performing Arts Centre's Glasshouse Theatre.

From 2003 to 2011, Palmer was chairman of Pacific Opera, a not-for-profit company established to give Australia's best young singers professional development and the experience necessary to launch their careers. From 2007 to 2011, he was president of the Arts Law Centre of Australia, a government-funded body which provides free or low-cost legal and business advice to artists in all media throughout Australia.

He is a director of Ars Musica Australis, which assists young performers in all media to study further in Australia and overseas, and also commissions new works from Australian composers. Palmer's music is published by and available from the Australian Music Centre.

=== Style ===
In an essay "Learning to be a composer", Palmer wrote:

I very much agree with the proposition that music owes its origin to the instinctive urge in humans to dance and sing. Dance and song inform all of my music. Dancing and singing require recognisable and repeatable rhythmic and melodic patterns. I have always followed Shostakovich's advice to his friend, Benjamin Britten: "Ben, never be afraid of a good tune." Shostakovich practised what he preached.

Palmer's style is essentially lyrical, ranging through the full spectrum of emotions. He endeavours to engage the audience, not alienate it, even when the subject matter is tragic or anguished. A work such as the string quintet Not Going Quietly, written in memory of Aaron McMillan, a brilliant Australian pianist who died of cancer at the age of 30, contains passages which are harsh and cry out in pain, as well as passages of gentle lyricism.

On 29 July 2012, William Chen premiered Palmer's Piano Concerto, accompanied by the Sydney Youth Orchestra. The piece was played at a cultural exchange concert, where pieces of Australian music were mixed with Chinese compositions. The work was inspired by an eighth-century Chinese poem, The Withered Tree, by Han Yu. and was described by one reviewer as having a "dramatic blend of emotions and pianistic styles".

== Honours ==
In June 2010 he was appointed a Member of the Order of Australia (AM) for services to law and to music as a composer and in leadership roles. In 2020 he was created a Papal knight in the Order of St. Gregory the Great for services to music, particularly to liturgical music, and the law.

== Key works ==
=== Opera ===
- Cloudstreet (2016; from the novel by Tim Winton)
- The Drover's Wife – The Opera (2025; from Leah Purcell's adaptation of Henry Lawson's short story "The Drover's Wife"

=== Orchestral ===
- Concerto for Two Clarinets and Chamber Orchestra
- Breaking the Silence, concerto for cello and chamber orchestra
- Concertino for Two Guitars and Orchestra
- Piano Concerto
- Incandescence
- The Beancounter Suite
- The Ruritanian Dances
- Toccata for Double String Orchestra
- Two Waltzes
- In Paradisum

=== Vocal ===
- Mass A Child Is Born (SATB, soprano, tenor, orchestra)
- Mass Benedictus Qui Venit (SATB, soprano, tenor, orchestra)
- Three Psalms (SATB, soloists)
- Canticles of Advent (SATB)
- Letters from a Black Snake, song cycle (baritone, piano)
- The Stubborn Heart, song cycle (soprano, piano)
- Figures in an Urban Landscape, song cycle (baritone, piano)
- The Faces of Mercy, (sop., SATB, clarinet, violin, viola, cello, organ)

=== Chamber ===
- String quintet Not Going Quietly
- Piano quartet The Way It Is
- Clarinet sonata Black, White and a Little Blue
- Time Out, 3 pieces for oboe and piano
- Ithaca, for clarinet, violin, viola and cello
