= Dženana Vucic =

Bosnian-Australian writer, poet and essayist

- Born: 1991 (age 34–35); Konjic, Herzegovina-Neretva Canton, Bosnia and Herzegovina
- Education: University of Glasgow (PhD)
- Occupations: Writer, poet, essayist
- Writing career
- Language: English, Bosnian
- Website: dzenanavucic.com

Dženana Vucic is a Bosnian-Australian writer, poet and essayist. She (Note: Vucic uses she/her and they/them pronouns. This article uses she/her pronouns for consistency.) is a contributor to Australian literary journals including Cordite Poetry Review, Kill Your Darlings, Overland, the Australian Multilingual Writing Project, Rabbit Poetry, Meanjin, Red Room Poetry and Sydney Review of Books. Vucic has lived in Glasgow, Berlin, Konjic and Melbourne.

== Early life ==
Vucic was born in Bosnia and Herzegovina to a Bosniak family. As a child, she emigrated to Australia as a refugee during the Bosnian War of 1992–1995, along with her mother and sister. She has written extensively about her experiences with her family around this time, particularly regarding switching from speaking Bosnian to English after migrating to Australia.

== Education ==
Vucic was awarded a PhD in English literature from the University of Glasgow.

== Career ==
She was selected for Kill Your Darlings' New Critic Program in 2023. In September 2025 she was appointed as the reviews editor at Cordite Poetry Review. She received the 2025 Red Room Fellowship. Her first poetry collection, after war, was released in 2026. She is the fiction editor at SAND.

== Awards and fellowships ==
Year	Nominated work	Prize	Category	Result	Ref.
2025	"Contrapuntal Facing Houla, Southern Lebanon"	Nillumbik Prize for Contemporary Writing	Poetry Open Category	Shortlisted	
2025		Copyright Agency Ltd Cultural Fund Fellowships	Frank Moorhouse Fellowship for Young Writers	Winner	
2024	"Blagaj, Mostar"	Peter Porter Poetry Prize		Shortlisted	
2024	"Because a Wind Blazes"	Judith Wright Poetry Prize for New & Emerging Poets		Shortlisted	
2023	"my father sits in a room alone"	Newcastle Poetry Prize		Shortlisted	
2023	"Everything I Don’t Know How to Say / sve što ne znam kako da kažem"	Woollahra Digital Literary Award	Non-Fiction	Shortlisted	
2022		Marten Bequest Scholarship	Prose	Winner	
2022	A Teleology	Peter Blazey Fellowship		Winner	
2021		Kat Muscat Fellowship		Winner	
2020		Wheeler Centre Hot Desk Fellowship		Winner	
2020	"Kin"	Woollahra Digital Literary Award	Non-Fiction	Shortlisted	
2020		Nillumbik Prize for Contemporary Writing	Essay	Shortlisted	
2019	"A Teleology of Folding, and of Dying"	Deakin University Nonfiction Prize		Shortlisted	
