= Island Magazine =

Tasmanian literary magazine

Island Magazine is a literary publication produced in Hobart, Tasmania. Island is one of only two literary magazines operating from regional Australia.

Started in 1979 it provides a forum for Tasmanian writers and writers from around Australia to publish new work.

The magazine's first issue in June 1979 was published as The Tasmanian Review. In March 1981, the magazine was renamed Island Magazine, to more accurately reflect its status as a national magazine rather than as a regional 'review'. Island Magazine published poems, short stories, articles, interviews, photographs and graphics. During the 1980s, the magazine exhibited a strong concern for ecological issues, supporting protests against the Tasmanian government's proposed damming of the Franklin River. The magazine now publishes nonfiction, fiction, poetry and arts features.

Island Magazine Inc. is a not-for-profit incorporated body run by a board of management.

== History ==
Michael Denholm, Andrew Sant and Tim Thorne founded The Tasmanian Review, publishing the first issue in June 1979. Thorne quit before the first issue was distributed. In March 1981, the magazine was renamed Island Magazine. The magazine attracted funding from the Australia Council — after four issues — before it began to receive matching funding from the Tasmanian Government via the Tasmanian Arts Advisory Board which, initially, was wary of providing support for the venture.

Island Magazine published poems, short stories, articles, interviews, photographs and graphics. During the 1980s, the magazine exhibited a strong concern for ecological issues, supporting protests against the Tasmanian government's proposed damming of the Franklin River. Reflecting the national character of the magazine, contributors during this period included Les Murray, Christopher Koch, Dorothy Green, Humphrey McQueen, Donald Horne, Frank Moorhouse, Gwen Harwood, Bernard Smith, Hugh Stretton, Tim Winton, Olga Masters, Marion Halligan, John Forbes, Judith Beveridge, Geoff Page and Peter Porter. As well as leading and new Australian writers, the magazine published writers of international standing such as the now Nobel Laureate, Tomas Transtomer. One of Island Magazine's editorial advisors, the author and psychoanalyst, Adam Phillips, was stationed in London, a reflection of the magazine's breadth.

In 1989, Denholm and Sant edited First Rights: A Decade of Island Magazine, bringing their term as editors of Island Magazine to a close. Cassandra Pybus was appointed editor and the magazine soon displayed the shortened title Island. During Pybus's term, circulation increased and the reputation of the magazine grew to rival many of the older mainland literary quarterlies. But Pybus's editorial practices, which came to propose employing a continuum of non-Tasmanian guest editors, caused a conflict with members of the magazine's board, including at that time, Richard Flanagan, Andrew Sant and Margaret Scott, who wanted the magazine to maintain its unique, Tasmanian base. In 1994, the board requested her resignation, ending Pybus's term in controversial circumstances, and prompting heated debates in the press both locally and nationally.

Rodney Croome, a prominent Tasmanian gay rights activist, was appointed editor of Island after a short interim period. This coincided with mainland criticism that Island was fast becoming a parochial publication and did not deserve funding from the federal government. The editorial board challenged this assertion, but, regardless, Croome followed an editorial policy that he later called 'Voicing the South'. In 1999, continuing financial difficulty influenced a 'strategic planning process' with the support of Arts Tasmania, resulting in a change of editorial policy to that originally voiced by Denholm and Sant: 'The two criteria which determine the selection of material for the journal are excellence and variety'. This policy was also implemented by David Owen, who was appointed editor in late 1999.

In 2021, Island announced a new nonfiction prize valued at A$3,000 for a work of fewer than 4,000 words.

== Frequency, circulation and readership ==
Island’s frequency varies between 2 and 4 issues per year, mainly dependent on funding. The printed magazine is mailed to subscribers nationally and internationally, and is available for sale via newsagents, bookshops and other stockists Australia-wide.

== Editors ==
Editors for the magazine have included:

- 1979 to 1989 Andrew Sant and Michael Denholm
- 1989 to 1994 Cassandra Pybus
- 1994 Russell Kelly
- 1995 to 1999 Rodney Croome
- 1999 to 2006 David Owen
- 2007 to 2010 Gina Mercer
- 2011 Sarah Kanowski
- 2012 Dale Campisi
- 2013 to 2015 Matthew Lamb
- 2016 to 2023 Vern Field (Managing Editor)
- 2023 to present Jane Rawson (Managing Editor)

Specialist section editors in 2024 are:

- Fiction – Kate Kruimink
- Nonfiction – Keely Jobe
- Poetry – Kate Middleton
- Arts Features – Judith Abell

== See also ==
- List of literary magazines
