= Charles Woolley =

Charles Woolley may refer to:

- Sir Charles Leonard Woolley (1880–1952), British archaeologist
- Charles A. Woolley (1834–1922), Australian photographer
- Charles Woolley (rugby league), New Zealand rugby league international
- Sir Charles Woolley (colonial administrator) (1893–1981), British colonial administrator
