= Peter Porter Poetry Prize =

International literary award

The Peter Porter Poetry Prize is an ongoing international literary award run by the Australian Book Review for outstanding poetry. Established by the ABR in 2005, the Prize is named after the late Australian poet Peter Porter. The Porter Prize, awarded annually by the ABR, is considered 'one of Australia’s most lucrative and respected awards for poetry' and among the country's 'most prestigious prizes for a new poem'. It 'guarantees winners wide exposure through publication in ABR and in 2017 received 'nearly 1000 entries from twenty-two countries'.

== History ==
The Porter Prize was established in 2005 by the Australian Book Review. Formerly known as the ABR Poetry Prize, it was renamed the Peter Porter Poetry Prize in 2010 in honour of the famed Australian poet. The award is open to all poets writing in English, regardless of where they reside.

== Winners ==
Since its inception in 2005, Judith Bishop has won twice.

- 2005: Stephen Edgar
- 2006: Judith Bishop
- 2007: Alex Skovron
- 2008: Ross Clark
- 2009: Tracy Ryan
- 2010: Anthony Lawrence
- 2011: Judith Bishop and Tony Lintermans (joint winners)
- 2012: Michael Farrell
- 2013: John A. Scott
- 2014: Jessica L. Wilkinson
- 2015: Judith Beveridge
- 2016: Amanda Joy
- 2017: Louis Klee and Damen O'Brien (joint winners)
- 2018: Nicholas Wong
- 2019: Andy Kissane and Belle Ling (joint winners)
- 2020: A. Frances Johnson
- 2021: Sara M. Saleh
- 2022: Anthony Lawrence
- 2023: Dan Disney
- 2024: Dan Hogan
- 2025: Meredith Stricker
- 2026: Cheryl Leavy
