= Delia Falconer =

Australian novelist

- Born: Delia Falconer; 1966 (age 59–60); Sydney, Australia
- Education: University of Melbourne; University of Sydney
- Occupation: Novelist
- Writing career
- Genres: Novel; non-fiction; essay
- Notable awards: Marten Bequest Scholarship 1998 Prose; Pascall Prize 2018 The Opposite of Glamour
- Website: deliafalconer.com.au

Delia Falconer (born 1966) is an Australian novelist best known for her novel The Service of Clouds. Her works have been nominated for several literary awards.

== Biography ==
Falconer is the only child of two graphic designers. She studied for her undergraduate degree at the University of Sydney and completed a Ph.D. in English Literature and Cultural Studies at the University of Melbourne.

She is the author of the novels The Service of Clouds and The Lost Thoughts of Soldiers (which was republished in Australian paperback as The Lost Thoughts of Soldiers and Selected Stories). She also wrote Sydney, a personal history of her hometown, for the Australian Cities series.

In 2010 she was appointed a senior lecturer in creative writing at the University of Technology Sydney. She has served as judge of a number of literary awards, including the Calibre Prize (2015), the Stella Prize (2017), and the NSW Premier's Literary Awards (2017).

== Recognition and awards ==
In 1998, Falconer was the recipient of the Marten Bequest Scholarship.

Falconer's books have been shortlisted for major Australian and international prizes across the fields of fiction, nonfiction, innovation, history, and biography.

In 2018, she won the Walkley-Pascall Award for "The Opposite of Glamour," which was published in the Sydney Review of Books.

== Selected works ==
=== Fiction ===
- —— (1997). The Service of Clouds. Macmillan. ISBN 9780330360272.
- —— (2005). The Lost Thoughts of Soldiers. Picador Books. ISBN 9780330421799.

=== Nonfiction ===
- —— (2017). "The Opposite of Glamour". Sydney Review of Books.
- —— (2020) [First published 2010]. Sydney. New South. ISBN 9781742237084.
- —— (2021). Signs and Wonders: Dispatches from a Time of Beauty and Loss. Scribner. ISBN 9781760857820.

=== As editor ===
- The Penguin Book of the Road: An Anthology of Stories of the Road (Camberwell: Penguin, 2008)
- The Best Australian Stories 2008 (Melbourne: Black Inc, 2008).
- The Best Australian Stories 2009 (Melbourne: Black Inc, 2009).
