= Sophie Cunningham (writer) =

Australian writer and editor

Sophie Cunningham AM
- Born: Sophie Alice Cunningham; Melbourne
- Occupations: Writer, editor

Sophie Cunningham AM is an Australian writer and editor based in Melbourne. She is the current Chair of the Board of the Australian Society of Authors, the national peak body representing Australian authors.

== Career ==
=== Publisher ===
Cunningham was publisher at McPhee Gribble/Penguin for two years and Trade Publisher at Allen & Unwin for ten years; there she was known for commissioning and editing innovative fiction and non-fiction. At McPhee Gribble the books she worked on included I Was a Teenage Fascist by David Greason, Glad All Over: The Countdown Years 1974–1987 by Peter Wilmoth and Holding the Man by Timothy Conigrave.

At Allen & Unwin she published Mark Davis's Gangland: Cultural Elites and the New Generationalism.

=== Author ===
In 2004 her own first novel, Geography, was published. In 2005 she was an Asialink resident in Sri Lanka, which provided research material for her novel Bird, which follows the life of a singer-actress who became a Buddhist nun.

Her non-fiction book Melbourne was published in 2011. Part memoir, part history, it is a portrait of the city as experienced through her own memories over the course of a year. In 2012 it was longlisted for the National Biography Award. It was re-issued in November 2020 with a new cover and introduction.

Warning: The Story of Cyclone Tracy was published by Text Publishing in 2014 and longlisted for the Walkley Award; Shortlisted for the Nita Kibble Award, the NIB Waverley Library Literary Award, University of Southern Queensland History Book Award and the Northern Territory History Award. City of Trees: Essays on Life, Death and the need for a Forest, also Text Publishing was published in 2019. Her first book for children, Tippy and Jellybean – The True Story of a Brave Koala who Saved her Baby from a Bushfire, was illustrated by Anil Tortop and published by Allen and Unwin in 2020, and her second, Flipper and Finnegan — The True Story of How Tiny Jumpers Saved Little Penguins in 2022.

Her novel This Devastating Fever was published in September 2022.

Cunningham has also written works of journalism, including travel writing, cultural analysis, and writing on Buddhism and television. From 2002 to 2005, she wrote the Couch Life column for the television section of The Age.

=== Editor ===
In 2008 Cunningham became the editor of Meanjin and aimed to make the literary magazine "lighter, more fun, but I don't mean lightweight." She also aimed to establish a younger audience for the magazine.

During her time as editor, Cunningham significantly expanded the magazine's online presence and launched several successful public events in Melbourne and Sydney (notably Meanland, in collaboration with Jeff Sparrow, editor of fellow literary journal Overland) to lead public debate on issues around digital publishing.

In 2010 she resigned, claiming she had been locked out of discussions about the publication's future and believed its owner, Melbourne University Press, intended to cease publishing the print edition. "I was not formally consulted once," she told Crikey. "I do know there was a sense – expressed by MUP – that I was not working with MUP closely enough and was being too independent. I had understood my task to be to keep Meanjin's separate identity."

Although there was speculation Meanjin would move to an online-only format, MUP chairman Alan Kohler denied this was the case.

== Stella Prize ==
In 2011 Cunningham was part of a group of 11 Australian women writers, editors, publishers and booksellers who became concerned about the poor representation of books by women in Australia's top literary prize, the Miles Franklin Award. In response, they established the Stella Prize (named after Stella Miles Franklin), a $50,000 annual award for writing by Australian women in all genres, similar to the UK's Orange Prize.

"After a rapid acceleration in women's rights in the '70s and '80s, things have started to go backwards," Cunningham said in a keynote address at the 2011 Melbourne Writers' Festival. "Women continue to be marginalised in Australian culture and, the arts sector – which likes to pride itself on its liberal values – is, in fact, complacent. Women are much less likely to win literary awards, to write reviews of books, or have their books reviewed. This, despite the fact they write about half the books published."

== Awards and recognition ==
Cunningham was made a Member of the Order of Australia (AM) in the 2019 Queen's Birthday Honours in recognition of her "significant service to literature as an author, editor and role model".

She has received the following awards for her work:

- City of Trees: Essays on Life, Death and the Need for a Forest Melbourne 2019 longlisted 'The Nib': CAL Waverley Library Award for Literature
- 'Staying with the Trouble' essay winner of 2015 Calibre Prize
- Warning 2015 winner 'The Nib': CAL Waverley Library Award for Literature – The Alex Buzo Shortlist Prize and University of Southern Queensland History Book Award and the Northern Territory History Award
- This Devastating Fever was shortlisted for the 2023 Victorian Premier's Prize for Fiction

== Personal life ==
Cunningham lives in Melbourne with her wife Virginia Murdoch. She is the daughter of deceased literary scholar and critic Peter Nicholls.

== Bibliography ==
=== Books ===
- Geography (Text, 2004), ISBN 9781920885038
- Bird (Text, 2008), ISBN 9781921351525
- Melbourne (UNSW Press, 2011), ISBN 9781742231389
- Warning: The Story of Cyclone Tracy (Text, 2014), ISBN 9781922079367
- City of Trees: Essays on Life, Death and the Need for a Forest (Text, 2019) ISBN 9781925773439
- Tippy and Jellybean – The True Story of a Brave Koala who Saved her Baby from a Bushfire (Text, 2020) ISBN 9781760878474
- Fire, Flood, Plague: Australian Writers Respond to 2020, Edited by Sophie Cunningham (Penguin Random House, 2020), ISBN 9781761040405
- Wonder – 175 Years of the Royal Botanic Gardens Written by Sophie Cunningham and Peter Wilmoth with photographs by Leigh Henningham (Hardie Grant, 2021) ISBN 9781743798058
- Flipper and Finnegan – The True Story of How Tiny Jumpers Saved Little Penguins (Albert Street Books, 2022) ISBN 9781761180071
- This Devastating Fever (Ultimo Press, 2022), ISBN 9781761150937

=== Book reviews ===
Date	Review article	Work(s) reviewed
2011	Cunningham, Sophie (June 2011). "Caleb goes to Harvard". Australian Book Review (332): 55–56.	Brooks, Geraldine (2011). Caleb's crossing. ISBN 978-0-14-312107-7.

=== Critical studies and reviews of Cunningham's work ===
Bird

- Ashton, Kalinda (Autumn 2009). "Forms of hunger and hysteria : recent Australian fiction". Overland. 194: 93–96.

Fire, flood, plague

- Dumont, Adele (January–February 2021). "Once, twice, thrice : a year of lamentation". Australian Book Review. 428: 60.
