= Old Tom =

Old Tom may refer to:

== People ==
- Old Tom Morris (1821–1908), Scottish golfer
- Old Tom Parr (1483–1635), alleged long-lived Englishman
- Old Tom Sharp, (1818–1894), American newspaper publisher and anti-Mormonist

== Other ==
- Old Tom (orca) (ca.1895–1930), an Orca nicknamed by Australian whalers
- Old Tom (TV series), a cartoon TV series about a cat
- Old Tom Gin, a type of gin that was popular in 18th-century England
- Old Tom, a 1994 children's book by author Leigh Hobbs
- Old Tom, a strong ale brewed by Robinsons Brewery
- Old Tom, a bell in the fictional Unseen University in the Discworld Novels of Sir Terry Pratchett
