= Peter Blazey Fellowship =

Australian literary award

The Peter Blazey Fellowship in an Australian literary award, in honour of the life and work of Peter Bradford Blazey (1939-1997).

== Establishment of Fellowship ==
The Fellowship was established by Clive Blazey and Tim Herbert, respectively, brother and partner to Peter Blazey, to honour his life and work, as a journalist, author and gay activist. The Fellowship was launched by the Hon. Justice Michael Kirby at the Australia Centre, in Melbourne, on 30 April 2004.

== Nature of Fellowship ==
The Fellowship is awarded annually to writers in the non-fiction fields of biography, autobiography and life-writing, and is intended to further a work in progress. The Fellowship comprises a monetary prize and a one-month writing residence with the Australia Centre, within the University of Melbourne.

== Fellowship winners ==
Year	Name	Project	References
2004	Sara Hardy		The Unusual Life of Edna Walling
2005	Jennifer Compton		"Who Doesn't Want Me to Dance"
2006	Robert Kenny		The Lamb Enters the Dreaming: Nathanael Pepper and the Ruptured World
2007	Judith Pugh		"In My Seventies" -- published as Unstill Life: Art, politics and living with Clifton Pugh.
2008	Andrew Lindsay		"The God of Morphine"
2008	Dmetri Kakmi		Motherland
2009	Maggie MacKellar		"Anatomy of a Grief" – published as When It Rains: A Memoir
2010	Lily Chan		Toyo
2011	Robyn Davidson		"Self-Portrait with Imaginary Mother" – published as Unfinished Woman
2012	Helen Ennis		Olive Cotton: A life in photography
2013	Kim Mahood		Position Doubtful
2014	Michael Farrell		The Case of Jong Ah Sing
2014	Mark Mordue		Boy On Fire: The Young Nick Cave
2015	Rebe Taylor		Into the Heart of Tasmania: A Search For Human Antiquity
2016	Julia Leigh		Avalanche
2017	Eleanor Hogan		Into the Loneliness: The Unholy Alliance of Ernestine Hill and Daisy Bates
2018	Cassandra Pybus		Truganini: Journey through the Apocalypse
2019	Sanaz Fotouhi		Love Marriage in Kabul: A Memoir
2020	Ellen van Neerven		Personal Score
2021	Declan Fry		"Justice for Elijah or a Spiritual Dialogue with Ziggy Ramo"
2022	Dženana Vucic		"A Teleology"
2023	S.J. Norman		Skin in the Game
2024	Fiona Murphy		"Lifelihood"
2025	Ju Bavyka		Just a Hand's Reach Away – Rukoi Podat
2026	Mykaela Saunders		"Dear Uncle"
2027	Amy McQuire		"State of Disappearance"
