= Sudesh Mishra =

- Awards: Harri Jones Memorial Prize for Poetry

Academic background
- Education: Flinders University

Sudesh Mishra (born 1962) is a contemporary Fijian-Australian poet and academic.

== Career ==
Sudesh Mishra was born in Fiji into an Indo-Fijian family in Suva and educated at Shri Vivekananda High School in Nadi. Coming to Australia to study he studied at The University of Wollongong and went on to complete a Ph.D. in English literature at Flinders University. He has published several volumes of poetry, the first of which, Rahu (means Rahu, the sun eclipse caused by the Asura in the Hindu mythology), received the Harri Jones Memorial Prize for Poetry in 1988. His writing commonly treats events in his home country, such as the 1987 coup, from an ironic perspective.

In 2003, he received an Asialink Literature Residency at Jawaharlal Nehru University, New Delhi. He is currently Head of the School of Pacific Arts, Communication and Education (SPACE) at University of the South Pacific. He was an associate professor in creative writing at Deakin University in Australia and has taught literature at Stirling University in Scotland and University of the South Pacific, Suva campus.

== Bibliography ==
Poetry

- Rahu (1987)
- Tandava (Meanjin, 1992) ISBN 0-9592528-1-9
- Memoirs of a Reluctant Traveller (Wakefield, 1994) ISBN 1-86254-315-1
- Diaspora and the difficult art of dying (University of Otago, 2002) ISBN 1-877276-18-9

Criticism

- Preparing faces : modernism and Indian poetry in English (CRNLE, 1995) ISBN 0-7258-0578-1
- Diaspora Criticism (Edinburgh: Edinburgh University Press, 2006)
- No Sign is an Island (2000)
