= Tracey Slaughter =

New Zealand writer and poet (born 1972)

- Born: 1972; Papatoetoe
- Education: Doctor of Philosophy
- Alma mater: University of Auckland
- Occupation: Writer, poet, university teacher
- Employer: University of Waikato

Tracey Slaughter (born 1972) is a New Zealand writer and poet.

== Life ==
Slaughter was born in Papatoetoe, South Auckland, and lived there until she was 10 years old, when her family moved to the Coromandel Peninsula. She studied at the University of Auckland, graduating with a Ph.D in 2002. The title of her PhD thesis was Her face looking back at me: reflections on New Zealand women's autobiography. Slaughter has tutored in English at Massey University and the University of Auckland, and is a lecturer in creative writing at the University of Waikato.

Slaughter's writing includes short stories, poems and novels, and focus on relationships and life in New Zealand. Her characters often experience trauma, such as suicide, cancer or infidelity.

Slaughter has won the Bank of New Zealand Katherine Mansfield Award twice, in 2001 and 2004. In 2014, she won the Bridport Short Story Award for scenes of a long-term nature. Slaughter was shortlisted for the Manchester Poetry Prize in 2014, and the Manchester Short Story Prize in 2015 for ‘Stage Three’. Also in 2015, she won the Landfall Essay Competition for her non-fiction work ‘Ashdown Place’.

In 2023 Slaughter was awarded the Manchester Fiction Prize for an unpublished portfolio of poems titled opioid sonatas. She won the 2024 Calibre Prize for her essay "why your hair is long & your stories short" and was longlisted for the 2025 Elizabeth Jolley Short Story Prize for "Sediment".

== Publications ==
- her body rises (Random House, 2005)
- the longest drink in town (Pania Press, 2015)
- deleted scenes for lovers (Victoria University Press, 2016)
- Conventional Weapons (Victoria University Press, 2019)
- Devil's Trumpet (Victoria University Press, 2021)
