= Robert Clinch =

Australian artist (born 1957)

Canary Yellow, by Robert Clinch

Robert Clinch (born 1957 in Cooma) is an Australian realist painter who is primarily known for his urban and industrial landscapes. He has won awards such as the Wynne Trustees' Watercolour Prize, a Marten Bequest Travelling Scholarship, and a State Library of Victoria Creative Fellowship. Many of his works have been acquired by major public, corporate, and private collections.

Clinch uses the renaissance medium of egg tempera, and has also completed works in gouache/watercolour, lithography, and automotive paint.

== Career ==
Clinch has no formal training as an artist.

In the 1980s, he began to exhibit in group shows in Victoria and New South Wales. His first solo exhibition, Works on Paper, was held at Robin Gibson galleries in 1988. Shortly after, he won the Wynne Trustees' Watercolour Prize with Orpheus.

In the early 1990s, a portrait of art collector Joseph Brown O.B.E. and commissions from Linfox helped to establish his career, and both Brown and Lindsay Fox continued to support his artwork in the following years.

In 1993, Clinch won the Wynne Trustees' Watercolour Prize a second time with Titans, as well as the Marten Bequest Travelling Scholarship. This funding was used to conduct research into egg tempera, a renaissance medium that is known for its satin-like surface and long-lasting brightness. After consulting art historians, conservators and Cennino Cennini's Renaissance handbook, Il libro dell'arte, Clinch began making his own paints and experimenting on small, custom-made gesso panels. Tempera soon became his medium of choice, in which his first major work was a portrait of Archibald Prize winner Sir William Dargie.

Due to the laborious nature of tempera, in the early 2000s Clinch turned to lithography as a more efficient medium for modest, small-scale works. His series Black and White depicts chess pieces arranged to create visual narratives referencing classical mythology and popular culture.

In 2013, the Art Gallery of Ballarat held a mid-career retrospective titled Fanfare for the Common Man. Many of the same works went on to Sounds of Silence, a 2014 solo exhibition at the National Museum in Szczecin, Poland.

Following these exhibitions, Clinch was commissioned to paint a classic Australian sports car, the Goggomobil Dart, with dozens of paper aeroplanes in flight. The project, which took over fifteen months, became the subject of a documentary by filmmaker Karl Von Möller. Titled D’Art, the film documents Clinch's process from design to exhibition setup, and features interviews with the artist and leading figures from the Australian art world and historic car world. It was screened at the Melbourne Documentary Film Festival in 2020.

After a brief hiatus, Clinch returned to tempera painting with the epic desert landscape, Life on Earth, which was completed in 2020.

== Works ==
Despite his realist style, Clinch's landscapes are fictional capricci, composed through plein-air sketches of existing environments and purpose-built shadow models. Contrary to general contemporary practice, Clinch does not work from photographs.

Intertextuality is prevalent in many of his works, which often have metaphoric or ekphrastic titles. Fanfare for the Common Man, an urban landscape featuring a solo trombonist on a rooftop, was inspired by musician Aaron Copland's composition of the same name. Time, painted in egg tempera, contrasts a decaying urban backdrop with a pristine seashell. From Bauhaus to Our House is named after Tom Wolfe’s critical narrative of modern architecture (itself a reference to the Bauhaus emphasis on functionality and mass production). Canary Yellow, referring to the sentinel canaries used in coal mines, pictures a city wall streaked with paint and overshadowed by a poisonous, orange-toned sky.

In the words of art writer, David Thomas, "In his paintings and lithographs, Robert Clinch creates a fictional world more real than reality itself. The minutae of his realism give his work great conviction, yet, it is in fact imagination wrapped in a sense of reality. His icons of the urban world bear witness to the potency of the visual image, powerful magical, and moving. His company is international, of the Americans Andrew Wyeth and Richard Estes, of the Australian-born Jeffrey Smart and William Delafield Cook. Allied in their spellbinding realism, they are not the same, for they use their tools of verisimilitude to create with infinite difference. Clinch is the master of the urban capriccio."

One of his most popular motifs, the paper dart, first appeared in a 1980s watercolour suite titled Flights of Fancy, followed by Madness and the award-winning Orpheus. The flying darts reappear in lithographs such as Ghost, Valentines, and Icarus. In his meditative tempera paintings Solitary and Sea Gulls, they are scattered across the ground. At the unveiling of the Goggomobil D’art, an installation of paper planes was suspended from the gallery ceiling.

== Personal life ==
Clinch lives in Melbourne, Australia. He is married with three children and four grandchildren. He is an avid supporter of the Essendon Football Club, whose guernsey his son wears in the painting Spartacus.
