= Judith Bishop =

Australian poet and linguist

- Born: 1972 (age 53–54); Melbourne, Victoria
- Occupations: Poet and linguist
- Writing career
- Language: English
- Years active: 1991–present
- Notable work: Interval
- Notable awards: 2019 Kenneth Slessor Prize for Poetry winner; Anne Elder Award 2008 for Event

Judith Bishop (born 1972) is an Australian poet, linguist and translator.

== Biography ==
Judith Bishop was born in Melbourne, Australia in 1972. She holds an MPhil from the University of Cambridge, an MFA in Writing from Washington University in St. Louis and a PhD in Linguistics from the University of Melbourne. In 1994 she received the Rae and Edith Bennett Travelling Scholarship for postgraduate study in the United Kingdom. Her MPhil thesis at Cambridge treated the poetry of Yves Bonnefoy.

In addition to her own work, Bishop has an interest in translating French poets, and has published translations of Philippe Jaccottet, René Char and Gérard Macé.

== Published works ==
- Circadia (UQP, June, 2024)
- Here Hear (Life Before Man, 2022)
- Interval (UQP, February 2018)
- Event (Salt Publishing, 2007) ISBN 978-1-84471-283-0
- Aftermarks (Vagabond Press, 2012)
- Alice Missing in Wonderland and other poems (Picaro Press, 2008)

== Awards ==
- Marten Bequest Travelling Scholarship, 2002–2004
- FAW Anne Elder Award, 2007, winner for Event
- Association for the Study of Australian Literature's Mary Gilmore Prize, 2008, shortlisted for Event
- Judith Wright Calanthe Award for Poetry, 2007, shortlisted for Event
- Victorian Premier's Awards C. J. Dennis Prize for Poetry, shortlisted for Event
- Peter Porter Poetry Prize, winner for "Still Life with Cockles and Shells" 2006, co-winner for "Openings" 2011
- Melbourne Prize for Literature Best Writing Award, finalist for Interval, 2018
- NSW Premier's Literary Awards, Kenneth Slessor Prize for Poetry, winner for Interval, 2019
- Melbourne Prize for Literature The Writers Prize finalist, 2024
- Melbourne Prize for Literature Civic Choice Award winner, 2024
