= Dmetri Kakmi =

Greek-Australian writer

Dmetri Kakmi (born 1961) is a Turkish-born, ethnic Greek, Australian essayist, reviewer, speaker, broadcaster, editor and author. He was born on the island of Tenedos (called "Bozcaada" since its annexation by Turkey in 1923) to Greek parents. The family migrated to Australia in 1971 when Kakmi was 10 years old. He did not return to Tenedos until 1999. His memoir of growing up on the island, titled Mother Land (2008, new edition by Eland 2015), has been published to widespread acclaim in Australia, England and Turkey. Kakmi also compiled and edited the children's anthology When we were young, and received the Peter Blazey Fellowship in 2008.

Kakmi's essays and short stories appear in a number of anthologies.

The essay 'Night of the Living Wog' is published in Joyful strains: making Australia home, Affirm Press, 2013. 'The Tranny Horror From Outer Space' is published in Ornaments From Two Countries. The supernatural short stories 'The Boy by the Gate' is published in The New Gothic, Stone Skin Press 2014; 'The Boy by the Gate' was reprinted in "The Year's Best Fantasy and Horror 2013". 'Haunting Matilda' is published in Cthulhu Deep Down Under. 'Haunting Matilda' was also shortlisted for Best Fantasy Novella in the Aurealis Awards, 2015.

He lives in Melbourne with his partner, the illustrator Leigh Hobbs, and until 2011 worked as a senior editor at Penguin Books.

The door and other uncanny tales was published by NineStar Press in September 2020. ‘The Woman in the Well’ was published by IFWG Publishing in 2025.

== Bibliography ==
=== Books ===
- Kakmi, Dmetri, ed. (2007). When we were young. Camberwell, Vic.: Viking.
- Kakmi, Dmetri (2008). Mother land. Artarmon, NSW: Giramondo.
  - — (2015). Mother land (New ed.). Eland.
- — (2020). The door and other uncanny tales (E-book). Albuquerque, New Mexico: NineStar Press.

Kakmi, Dmetri, The woman in the well, IFWG Publishing, Queensland, Australia, 2025

=== Critical studies and reviews of Kakmi's work ===
Mother land

- Allen, Delia (Autumn 2009). "Narratives of exile". Overland. 194: 88.
