= Aaron McMillan =

Australian classical pianist

Aaron McMillan (11 February 1977 – 14 May 2007) was an Australian classical pianist.

He attended Glenaeon Rudolf Steiner School in Middle Cove, New South Wales, near Sydney. A keen basketballer, at age 15 he captained his local basketball team to a state championship and was named most valuable player. He hoped to gain selection in the national basketball team at the 2000 Sydney Olympics. After an injury during training forced his departure from the sport, he then moved to his next passion, music.

He continued piano studies with Neta Maughan (teacher of Michael Kieran Harvey, Simon Tedeschi, and her own daughter Tamara Anna Cislowska). At age 16, he was the youngest Australian pianist to gain a Licentiate Diploma of Music with distinction. He took part in the 1996 Sydney International Piano Competition.

In addition to performing, he became an entrepreneur. He organised and financed many of his own concerts and recordings, but also set up a company called "Wayfarer" to promote other musicians. He organised a concert at the Sydney Town Hall where 20 Australian composers performed their own works - these included Dulcie Holland, Miriam Hyde and Elena Kats-Chernin.

As an adult his other love was cricket. He coached other players and through the game he met Gavin Robertson and Steve Waugh, and Tim Farriss from INXS, who all became his friends.

In 2001, McMillan was diagnosed with hemangiopericytoma, a rare brain tumour. It was discovered while he was being photographed for the cover of an album. A small pimple on his eyelid prompted him to see a doctor, who diagnosed the condition. He was operated on by Charlie Teo and the tumour was successfully removed. The first of two Australian Story programs on ABC television, entitled Playing for Time, followed his surgery at Sydney's Prince of Wales Hospital. Among his various charity work, he was an ambassador for Charlie Teo's "Cure for Life Foundation". The tumour returned in 2003. It did not respond to treatment, and by 2005 he could no longer play the piano.

McMillan performed solo at the Sydney Opera House on two occasions. Because of his illness, he could not perform at a planned third concert but instead made it an opportunity for him to present other pianists. He released a 9-CD box set of his recordings, which he produced from his bed in the palliative care unit of St Vincent's Hospital in Darlinghurst. The Governor of New South Wales, Marie Bashir, officiated at the release. His story is told in Susan Wyndham's book, "Life In His Hands", which deals with both Aaron and Charlie Teo, his neurosurgeon.

He died on 14 May 2007 at St Vincent's Hospital. Just three days prior to his death, at his hospital bedside, he was awarded a Mo Award for services to the entertainment industry.

== Family ==
His parents, Brian McMillan, and Gail née Robinson, met on a meditation retreat. Soon after Aaron's birth, his father left to become a Buddhist monk in Thailand, and did not see his son again until he was 15. In the meantime, the marriage was dissolved, and his mother married Giles Puckett, and they had two additional children. Aaron, an only child, gained two siblings. Aaron was influenced by his grandparents' Roman Catholicism, by Rudolf Steiner's anthroposophy, by his father's Buddhism, and other spiritual ideas.

== Awards ==
=== Mo Awards ===
The Australian Entertainment Mo Awards (commonly known informally as the Mo Awards), were annual Australian entertainment industry awards. They recognise achievements in live entertainment in Australia from 1975 to 2016. Aaron McMillan won one award in that time.

Year	Nominee / work	Award	Result (wins only)
2006	Aaron McMillan	Outstanding Contribution to Australian Music	Won
