= Andy Kissane =

Australian poet and novelist

Andy Kissane (born 13 September 1959), is a Melbourne-born, Sydney-based writer. He has written a number of poetry collections as well as short stories, novels and non-fiction.

== Personal life ==
Kissane was born in Melbourne, but moved to Sydney in 1987, where he lives in Sydney with his partner and daughter. He has worked as a high school teacher, writer-in-residence and university lecturer. He has also produced audiobooks. Kissane is a supporter of the Brisbane Lions and coaches basketball. He enjoys gardening, especially bushland regeneration. His older brother is the Australian psychiatrist Professor David Kissane.

== Awards and Accolades ==
Kissane has won several awards for his writing, including the Sydney Writers' Festival Poetry Olympics, the Publisher's Cup Cricket Poetry Award, the Harri Jones Memorial Prize for Poetry and the BTG-Blue Dog Poetry reviewing prize. In 2011, his book Out to Lunch was shortlisted for the Kenneth Slessor Prize for Poetry, one of New South Wales Premier's Literary Awards. His poem Searching the Dead was joint winner of the 2019 Peter Porter Poetry Prize.

== Bibliography ==
=== Poetry ===
- Facing the moon (Five Islands Press, 1993) ISBN 1875604103
- Every Night They Dance (Five Islands Press, 2000) ISBN 0-86418-544-8
- Out to Lunch (Puncher & Wattmann, 2009) ISBN 978-1-921450-20-4
- Radiance (Puncher & Wattmann, 2014) ISBN 9781922186522
- The Tomb of the Unknown Artist (Puncher and Wattmann, 2019) ISBN 9781925780376

=== Fiction ===
==== Short story collections ====
- The Swarm (Puncher & Wattmann, 2012) ISBN 9781921450556

==== Novels ====
- Under the Same Sun (Sceptre, 2000) ISBN 978-0-7336-1265-7

=== Non-Fiction ===
- Feeding the Ghost 1: Criticism on Contemporary Australian Poetry (ed. with David Musgrave & Carolyn Rickett) (Puncher & Wattmann, 2018) ISBN 9781921450358
