= Jennifer Harrison =

Australian poet (born 1955)

Jennifer Harrison (born 1955) is a contemporary Australian poet and child psychiatrist. She is a recipient of the Christopher Brennan Award.

Born in Liverpool, Sydney, Harrison studied medicine and then specialised in psychiatry. Since her first volume of poetry, Michelangelo's Prisoners in 1994, she has published several more, winning the 1995 Anne Elder Award and being short-listed for the 2000 Kenneth Slessor Prize for Poetry. In 2011 she won the Christopher Brennan Award for lifetime achievement in poetry. Her photography has been exhibited at the National Gallery of Victoria.

Having lived in the United States and New Zealand, Harrison resides in Melbourne and is employed as a child psychiatrist. She is also a photographer. She is The Dax Poetry Collection Manager for the Dax Centre at the University of Melbourne.

Harrison was appointed a Member of the Order of Australia in the 2026 King's Birthday Honours for "significant service to youth and children's psychiatry, and to the arts".

In 2026, she was a winner of the Alex Buzo Shortlist Prize and was shortlisted for the Mark and Evette Moran Nib Award for Literature for Sideshow History.

== Works ==
Poetry

- Michelangelo's Prisoners. (Black Pepper publishing, 1994) ISBN 978-1-875606-20-7
- Mosaics & Mirrors: Composite poems. (Black Pepper publishing, 1995) ISBN 978-0-646-24047-3
- Cabramatta/Cudmirrah. (Black Pepper publishing, 1996) ISBN 978-1-876044-11-4
- Dear B. (Black Pepper publishing, 1998) ISBN 978-1-876044-27-5
- Folly & Grief. (Black Pepper publishing, 2006) ISBN 1-876044-45-4 REVIEW REVIEW
- Colombine, New & Selected Poems. (Black Pepper publishing, 2010) ISBN 9781876044657
- Anywhy. (Black Pepper publishing, 2017) ISBN 9781876044190
- Air Variations. (Recent Work Press, 2017) ISBN 9781740884693
- Sideshow History. (Black Pepper publishing, 2025) ISBN 9780648038795

Edited

- With Phil Ilton, Said the Rat!. (Black Pepper publishing, 2003) ISBN 1-876044-44-6
- With Kate Waterhouse, Motherlode; Australian Women's Poetry 1986-2008. (Puncher & Wattmann, 2009) ISBN 978-1-921450-16-7
