= Harri Jones Memorial Prize for Poetry =

The Harri Jones Memorial Prize for Poetry is an annual prize awarded by the University of Newcastle to “an Australian poet, not yet 36 years of age, whose work in the field of poetry is judged to be outstanding”. It's named for T. Harri Jones, a former lecturer at the university, who died in a tragic accident in 1965. As an acknowledgement of the impact Harry made on his students between 1959 and 1965, in 2011 this prize was incorporated into the already established Newberry Poetry Prize as a special category.

== Winners ==
- 2026: Mitch Cave, Against the shore and ascending
- 2024: Andrew Menken, Lake Days
- 2023: Jake Goetz, "Internal Climates"
- 2022: Dan Hogan, A Life of Prizes
- 2021: Jocelyn Deane, Haruspex
- 2020: Peter Ramm
- 2019: Caitlin Maling
- 2018: Chloe Wilson
- 2017: Joan Fleming
- 2016: Katie Mills
- 2010:
- 2009: Jacqueline Krynda
- 2008:
- 2007: Amanda Ireland
- 2006:
- 2005: Andrew Slattery
- 2004: Katie Lawrence
- 2003: Julian Polain
- 2002: Michelle A. Taylor, Angel of Barbican High (UQP)
- 2001:
- 2000:
- 1999:
- 1998: B. R. Dionysius
- 1997: Michael Farrell
- 1996: Anthony Lawrence
- 1993: Andy Kissane, Facing the Moon (Five Islands)
- 1988: Sudesh Mishra, "Rahu"
- 1987: Yvette Christiansë
- 1984: Stephen Edgar
- 1976: Jennifer Maiden, The Problem of Evil (Prism)
- 1975: Robert Harris
- 1973: Rhyll McMaster, The Brineshrimp (UQP)
- 1972: J. S. Harry, The Deer Under the Skin
