= Neta Maughan =

Australian piano teacher (born 1938)

Neta Anne Maughan AM (born August 1938) is an Australian piano teacher. Her teaching career has spanned 63 years (2019) and in that time she has taught thousands of students in her main discipline of the piano, vocal, theory and accompaniment training.

Her pupils have included Michael Kieran Harvey, Bernadette Harvey, Neal Peres Da Costa, Simon Tedeschi, Anthony Fogg, Damian Whiteley, Emily Jeffrey, Stephen Delaney, Kathryn Lambert, Aaron McMillan, Marilyn Meier, Dennis Rees, and her own daughter Tamara-Anna Cislowska.

== Early life ==
Maughan was born in Hendra, Brisbane, grew up in Sydney's western suburbs and attended St Vincent's College, Potts Point after her parents moved from Kyogle. She comes from a long line of pianists and piano teachers - five generations of her family have been either performers or educators or both.

Maughan started teaching music when she was 17 years old.

She enrolled in a diploma of music at the New South Wales Conservatorium of Music (now the Sydney Conservatorium of Music), however was forced to withdraw in her final year due to deaths in her immediate family. She later continued her studies and studied voice under Elizabeth Todd and piano under Alexander Sverjensky.

== Career ==
Maughan taught piano, voice and music theory at the Sydney Conservatorium of Music for 35 years. She was appointed on salary at Newcastle Conservatorium in 1968, where she taught piano and lectured to the diploma class (DSCM). She also received the Australian Music Examinations Board award for excellence in teaching on at least 27 occasions. She also taught private students at her home, and was an Examiner for the AMEB for 45 years.

In 2010, Maughan was appointed a Member of the Order of Australia for services to music education as a piano, voice and music theory teacher and as a guide to young musicians.
