= Joan Fleming (poet) =

Australian poet

Joan Fleming (born Megan Joan Fleming, 1984), is an Australian/New Zealand novelist, poet, essayist and academic.

In 2025, she was appointed the Writer in Residence for the University of Waikato

In 2026, her debut novel The Fig Book will be published

== Biography ==
Fleming was born in Vancouver, Canada and grew up in Sydney, Australia, before her family relocated first to Bermuda, then Golden, Colorado, before finally settling in Auckland, New Zealand. Her mother is a physician and her father a geologist. She studied creative writing at the International Institute of Modern Letters at Victoria University, where she won the Biggs Poetry Prize in 2007. She graduated from the University of Otago with a Master of Arts with a thesis on the iterative poetry of Anne Carson. She holds a PhD in ethnopoetics from Monash University, Melbourne, a city in which she now lives.

Fleming's grandparents were stationed as Baptist missionaries in the town of Yuendumu, in the Northern Territory of Australia. As a result, Fleming has an ongoing interest in Warlpiri culture, with much of her poetry and non-fiction work self-described as focusing on cultural misunderstandings, the limits of language, and the continuing effects of colonialism. More recent work also explores such themes as eco-feminism and ecological collapse.

She has published a number of collections of poetry, as well as writing and co-editing works of literary criticism, essays, short stories and book reviews for publications in Australia, New Zealand and overseas.

== Awards and honours ==
Fleming's honours include the Biggs Poetry Prize, the Verge Prize for Poetry and the Harri Jones Memorial Prize from the Hunter Writers Centre in 2017. In 2021, she was shortlisted for the Helen Anne Bell Poetry Bequest award for her unpublished manuscript Dirt.

== Publications ==
Fiction
- The Fig Book (2026)
Poetry

- Song of Less (Cordite, 2021)
- Failed Love Poems (Victoria UP, 2015)
- The Same As Yes (Victoria UP, 2011)

Non-Fiction

- Dressing for the Apocalypse (Island, 2021)
- Pulling Up the Walls (Verge, Monash UP, 2021)
- Write First, Apologise Later? (Pantograph Punch, 2020)
- Notes Toward a Theory of Making (Westerly 64.1, 2019)
- Kardiya as Kindergartner: The Poetics of Ignorance in the Central Desert (Meanjin 78.1, 2019)
- Seated between the eyes of two worlds: the Intercultural work of Craig San Roque (Philosophy Activism Nature 13, 2018)
- The limits of knowledge: A reflexive reading of Warlpiri poetics (JEASA 9.1, 2018)
- On Misunderstanding, Masquerade, and the Prose Poem (Bonsai: Best Small Stories from Aotearoa New Zealand)

Editor

- Rabbit 39 - Mutiny (Rabbit, 2024)
- Verge 2015 (Monash UP, 2015)
