= Rae and Edith Bennett Travelling Scholarship =

Scholarship by the University of Melbourne

The Rae and Edith Bennett Travelling Scholarship is a scholarship awarded annually to students and graduates of the University of Melbourne to undertake graduate study in the United Kingdom.

The scholarship was established by the estate of Victorian bank manager Rae Bennett, with the condition that scholarship recipients were "chosen from graduates displaying force of character industry thrift and true sportsmanship or sportswomanship along with their scholastic attainments and further qualities of good citizenship and signs of good family upbringing".

Recipients have come from all faculties in the University, and have included visual artist Callum Cooper, Opera Australia principal artist Christopher Field, (2002) and historians Alana Harris (2003), and Benjamin Mountford (2008). Poet Judith Bishop won the award in 1994 and completed a thesis on the poetry of Yves Bonnefoy at the University of Cambridge.

The Robert Wallace Chair of English at the University of Melbourne, Professor Deirdre Coleman was one of the inaugural recipients in 1979.
