= Black Pepper Publishing =

Australian independent publishing house

Black Pepper is an independent Australian publishing house founded by Kevin Pearson and Gail Hannah in 1995 specializing in Australian poetry and fiction. Its innovative titles have won critical acclaim.

== Publication ==
In 1995 it published the first poetry collection by Jennifer Harrison, Michelangelo’s Prisoners (winner of the Anne Elder Award 1995). It has also published her later poetry including Cabramatta/Cudbmirrah (1996), Dear B (1999) (shortlisted for the New South Wales Premier's Literary Awards 2000, The Age Book of the Year Award 1999 and the Judith Wright Poetry Prize), Folly & Grief (2006) and Colombine, New & Selected Poems [2010]. Amongst a number of other poetry titles are: Jordie Albiston’s ficto-historical Botany Bay Document; A Poetical History of the Women of Botany Bay (1996) and The Hanging of Jean Lee (1998), John Anderson's eco-poetry, the forest set out like the night (1997) and dream poems, the shadow’s keep (1997), Alison Croggon’s The Blue Gate (1997) (shortlisted for the C.J. Dennis Prize for Poetry), two poetry collections by Australian playwright Jack Hibberd, English/Gaelic poetry by Irish Louis de Paor, works by K.F. Pearson and Andrew Sant, including Andrew Sant’s Tremors; New and Selected Poems (2004), Shelton Lea's final poetry collection, Nebuchadnezzar (2005), Emma Lew’s first collection, The Wild Reply (1997) (shortlisted for the NSW Premier's Prize 1997, co-winner of The Age Book of the Year Prize (The Dinny O'Hearn Poetry Prize) 1997, winner of the Dame Mary Gilmore Prize 1997 and runner-up for the Anne Elder Award), Adrienne Eberhard's Agamemnon’s Poppies (2003) and Jane, Lady Franklin (2004), four collections by the formalist poet Stephen Edgar, Other Summers (2006), History of the Day (2009), Eldershaw (2013) (short-listed for the Queensland Literary Awards 2013 and the Prime Minister's Literary Awards 2014 and joint winner of the 2013 Colin Roderick Award) and Exhibits of the Sun (2014), and Homer Rieth's epic poem Wimmera (2009) (short-listed for The Age Book of the Year 2010 for Poetry).

In novels, Black Pepper has published a number of works including those of Phil Leask, Alan Wearne, Alison Croggon’s Navigatio (1996), Barry Klemm's Vietnam War novel, Running Dogs (2000), Wayne Macauley's Blueprints for a Barbed-Wire Canoe (2004), Caravan Story (2007) and Other Stories (2010) (short fiction), David Cohen's Fear of Tennis (2007), Nicolette Stasko's episodic The Invention of Everyday Life (2007), Susan Hancock's The Peastick Girl (2013) and Alan Gould's The Poets' Stairwell (2015).

Other works published have included a book of plays by Daniel Keene, To Whom It May Concern and other plays (2000), short fictions by Graham Henderson and the commentary by Alan Loney, The printing of a masterpiece (2008).

Black Pepper is a member of SPN , (Small Press Network - Australia).
