= Kalinda Ashton =

Australian writer

Kalinda Ashton is an Australian writer based in Melbourne, Victoria. She is the author of the 2009 novel The Danger Game and was joint winner of the 2012 Sydney Morning Herald best young novelist award and a Betty Trask award in the UK.

In 2010, Ashton received an Australia Council Literature Board Grant for Developing Writers. She is an associate editor of the literary journal, Overland.

== Bibliography ==
=== Book reviews ===
Year	Review article	Work(s) reviewed
2009	Ashton, Kalinda (Autumn 2009). "Forms of hunger and hysteria : recent Australian fiction". Overland. 194: 93–96.	Tsiolkas, Christos (2008). The slap. Sydney: Allen & Unwin.; Cunningham, Sophie (2008). Bird. Text.; Flanagan, Richard (2008). Wanting. Random House.; Leigh, Julia (2008). Disquiet. Hamish Hamilton.; Lohrey,Amanda (2008). Vertigo. Black Inc.
