= Sydney Review of Books =

Australian literary magazine

- Editor: James Jiang
- Former editors: James Ley, Catriona Menzies-Pike
- Publisher: Writing and Society Research Centre, Western Sydney University
- First issue: 2013; 13 years ago
- Country: Australia
- Based in: Parramatta, NSW
- Language: English
- Website: sydneyreviewofbooks.com
- ISSN: 2201-8735

The Sydney Review of Books (SRB) is an online literary magazine established in 2013.

According to the journal's inaugural editor James Ley it was created to address shortcomings in Australian book reviews.

== Awards ==
In 2019 SRB contributor Fiona Kelly McGregor won the Woollahra Digital Literary Award for Non-Fiction for her essay on Kathleen Mary Fallon's "Working Hot". In 2019, SRB contributor Jeff Sparrow won the Walkley-Pascall Award for Arts Criticism for his review essay of Behrouz Boochani's No Friend But The Mountains. In 2018, SRB contributor Delia Falconer won this award for an essay on writing and extinction entitled "The Opposite of Glamour".

== Editors ==
James Ley was the founding editor of the Sydney Review of Books (2013–2015). He was replaced by Catriona Menzies-Pike (2015–2022), while James Jiang was appointed editor in 2023.

== Funding ==
The journal is funded by Western Sydney University's Writing and Society Research Centre, the Australia Council, Create NSW, the Copyright Agency, Creative Victoria, Arts Queensland, Arts Tasmania, City of Sydney and Parramatta City.
