= Leigh Hobbs =

Australian artist and author (born 1953)

- Hobbs in his studio, 2010
- Born: 18 April 1953 (age 73); Williamstown, Victoria, Australia
- Education: Caulfield Institute of Technology (now Monash University)
- Occupations: Artist; Author; Illustrator
- Partner: Dmetri Kakmi
- Writing career
- Notable works: Old Tom series, Horrible Harriet, Fiona the Pig, Mr Badger, Mr Chicken
- Notable awards: Australian Children's Laureate (2016–2017)
- Website: Leigh Hobbs official website

Leigh Hobbs (born 18 April 1953) is an Australian artist and author. He is best known in Australia and the United Kingdom for the humorous children's books which he has written and illustrated, although he has produced works across a wide range of mediums. His books principally feature the characters Old Tom, Horrible Harriet, Fiona the Pig, Mr Badger and Mr Chicken, and characters from the 4F for FREAKS books. He was the Australian Children's Laureate for 2016–17.

== Life and career ==
The Old Tom with comb artwork is by Leigh Hobbs

Leigh Hobbs was born in Williamstown in Victoria, Australia and grew up in the town of Bairnsdale. After graduating from Caulfield Institute of Technology art school (now Monash University) in 1973, he was employed as an artist at Sydney's Luna Park, an amusement park located adjacent to the Sydney Harbour Bridge. While there he designed the colour scheme for the antique carousel, and created two large three-dimensional characters called Larry and Lizzy Luna, which now reside at Sydney's Powerhouse Museum. Between 1978 and 2002 Hobbs supported his artistic career by working as a secondary school art teacher.

In 1980 Hobbs held a one-man show of caricature sculptures at the Rex Irwin Gallery in Sydney. Between 1985 and 2010 he was a freelance contributing cartoonist for The Age newspaper in Melbourne, Victoria. Since 1999 time a number of major profiles of Hobbs and his work have been published. In 1983 Leigh Hobbs created a series of glazed ceramic tea pots in the shape of Melbourne's Flinders Street Station. These are in the collection of a number of galleries including the National Gallery of Victoria. In 1999 Hobbs designed the colour scheme for the entrance to Melbourne's Luna Park in St. Kilda. Between 1998 and 2002 a French/Australian co-produced animated cartoon TV series Old Tom was created based on his Old Tom books, and over 50 episodes were broadcast in Australia on ABC TV. In 2013 Australia's National Institute of Dramatic Art (NIDA) adapted Hobbs' book Mr Chicken Goes To Paris for the stage and the book is a popular title in the Musée du Louvre bookshop in Paris.

Leigh Hobbs's children's books are often described as working on a number of levels and could be seen as gently subversive. For example, Hobbs's most popular creation, Old Tom, is a grotesque one eyed cat, but the word cat is never used in the books. Old Tom's 'owner' a prim matron like character called Angela Throgmorton thinks of Old Tom as her 'son' and the stories revolve around her efforts to socialise this creature who is in fact like a seven-year-old boy trying to break free of a mothers constraints. Hobbs has frequently been shortlisted for the CBCA's Picture Book of the Year award, his books have won many of the major children's choice awards in Australia, and in 2010 Old Tom was short-listed for the Prime Minister's Literary Awards. In Australia his works are published by Allen & Unwin

Leigh Hobbs's artwork, paintings, drawings, prints, illustrations and ceramics are to be found in numerous private collections, public art galleries, and institutions including the National Gallery of Victoria and the State Libraries of Victoria, and Western Australia. A 1993 photo-portrait by Francis Reiss of Hobbs at work is held in Australia's National Portrait Gallery.

Leigh Hobbs was the Australian Children's Laureate for 2016 & 2017.

In 2019 Australia Post featured Leigh and his character Mr Chicken on an 'Australian Legends of Children's Literature' postage stamp

== Personal life ==
He lives in Melbourne with his partner the writer Dmetri Kakmi.

== Bibliography ==
The following books were written and illustrated by Leigh Hobbs:

- Old Tom (1994)
- Old Tom at the Beach (1995)
- Old Tom goes To Mars (1996)
- Old Tom’s Guide to Being Good (1998)
- Horrible Harriet (2001)
- Old Tom’s Holiday (2002)
- Old Tom Man of Mystery (2003)
- Fiona The Pig (2004)
- Hooray For Horrible Harriet (2005)
- 4F For Freaks (2006)
- Fiona The Pig’s Big Day (2006)
- Freaks Ahoy (2007)
- Old Tom’s Big Book of Beauty (2007)
- A Friend For Old Tom (2008)
- Mr Chicken Goes To Paris (2009)
- Mr Badger and The Big Surprise (2010)
- Mr Badger and The Missing Ape (2010)
- Mr Badger and The Difficult Duchess (2011)
- Mr Badger and The Magic Mirror (2011)
- Horrible Harriet’s Inheritance (2012)
- Mr Chicken Lands on London (2014)
- Mr Chicken arriva a Roma (2016)
- Mr Chicken All Over Australia (2019)
- Horrible Harriet and The Terrible Tantrum (2021)
- Mr Chicken Goes to Mars (2023)
