= David Hansen (art historian) =

Australian art historian (1958–2024)

- Born: 1958
- Died: 13 January 2024 (aged 65); Hobart, Australia
- Education: University of Melbourne
- Occupation: Art historian
- Known for: Australian Colonial art, Australian Impressionism, Postcolonial art

David Hansen (1958 – 13 January 2024) was an Australian art historian. Hansen made notable contributions to the understanding of Australian art history, and curatorship, specialising in early colonial Australian imagery and artwork from the British Regency period.

== Career highlights ==
In 1980, shortly after graduating from the University of Melbourne, Hansen became the Director of the Warrnambool Art Gallery, at the age of 21. During his tenure, he oversaw the construction of a new gallery, writing and publishing a collection catalogue, and providing support to Australian regional artists. His keen artistic judgment led to a catalogue essay for Rick Amor's inaugural museum exhibition in 1990.

From 1986 to 1988, Hansen served as the Coordinating Curator for "The Face of Australia, the Land and the People, the Past & the Present", a major exhibition and publication. Commissioned by the Australian Bicentennial Authority, this exhibition toured extensively, featuring nearly 300 works from 57 non-State galleries across 10 venues throughout Australia.

Following directorial positions at the Riddoch Art Gallery and the Australian Sculpture Triennial, Hansen joined the Tasmanian Museum and Art Gallery in Hobart, as Senior Curator from 1994 to 2005. During this time, he curated many exhibitions on Tasmanian art, from colonial to contemporary work. Notably, his 2003 exhibition and publication on the first professional artist in Australia, John Glover, garnered significant recognition of his expertise on colonial art.

Hansen returned to the University of Melbourne as an Australia Council Senior Fellow from 2005 to 2007. He was then hired as a Senior Researcher and Paintings Specialist at Sotheby's from 2007 to 2014. In 2014, Hansen was appointed associate professor at the Centre for Art History and Art Theory, Australian National University, a role in which he served until his retirement in 2022.

== Notable contributions and awards ==
Hansen was renowned for his writing, educational prowess, and approach to art and curation. His research shaped new interpretations of colonial Australian landscape painting and Australian art.

In recognition of the quality and extent of his scholarly publications, the University of Melbourne awarded him a Doctor of Letters (PhD by publication) in 2004.

In 2018 his work 'Dempsey's People' was awarded the William M.B. Berger Prize for British Art History.

In 2022 and 2023, Hansen participated in the Attingham Trust Royal Collections Studies program, receiving the Nina Stanton Copland Foundation Scholarship to further his research.

Hansen's final project, an exhibition on the little-known early colonial artist, Charles Rodius, was hosted at the State Library of New South Wales from June 2023 to May 2024. The exhibition, which built on the research undertaken during his tenure as the inaugural Ross Steele AM Fellow at the Library in 2019, showcased Rodius' vivid portraits of indigenous and non-indigenous subjects. It is reported that Hansen's book on Rodius was nearing completion at the time of his death in 2024 and will be published posthumously.

== Death ==
Hansen died in Hobart, Tasmania, on 13 January 2024, at the age of 65.

== Publications ==
- The Warrnambool Art Gallery (1886–1986): a history of the collection and a catalogue of selected works / [edited by David Hansen]. Warrnambool [Vic.]: The Gallery. ISBN 0-9589753-2-9
- Hansen, David & Australian Bicentennial Authority. (1988). 'The face of Australia: the land & the people, the past & the present'. Sydney: Fine Arts Press. ISBN 0-86917-014-7
- David Hansen, Rick Amor: Paintings & Drawings 1983–1990 (exhibition catalogue.), Warrnambool Art Gallery, Warrnambool, Victoria, 1990.
- Hansen, David & Burgess, Erica & Timms, Peter, 1948- & Butler, Roger, 1948- & McPhee, John A. (John Alexander) & McLean, Ian, 1952- & Staples, Max & Jones, Clodagh & Art Gallery of South Australia & Tasmanian Museum and Art Gallery & National Gallery of Australia & National Gallery of Victoria & Art Exhibitions Australia. (2003). 'John Glover and the Colonial picturesque'. Tasmanian Museum and Art Gallery; Art Exhibitions Australia Limited. ISBN 0-9750545-1-1
- 2007 - Essay 'Death Dance', explores the imagery depicting the early colonial Indigenous leader Bungaree. This essay was commended in the inaugural Australian Book Review's Calibre Essay Prize in 2007.
- 2010 - Essay 'Seeing Truganini', explores the role and responsibilities of history in the contemporary interpretation of indigenous objects. It won the Calibre Prize 2010 and also the Alfred Deakin Prize for an Essay Advancing Public Debate, at the Victorian Premier's Literary Awards.
- Hansen, David. (2010). 'Remarkable Characters': John Dempsey and the representation of the urban poor in Regency Britain. The British Art Journal. 11. 75–88. doi:10.2307/41615393
- Hansen, David & National Portrait Gallery (Australia). (2017). 'Dempsey's people: a folio of British street portraits 1824-1844'. Canberra: National Portrait Gallery. ISBN 978-0-9953975-1-4
- Hansen, David. (2017). Tom Roberts: 'End to a career – an old scrub-cutter': 4 December 2015 – 28 March 2016; National Gallery of Australia, Canberra. Australian Historical Studies. 48. 1–6. doi:10.1080/1031461X.2017.1308812
