= Stephen Edgar =

Australian poet, editor and indexer

Stephen Edgar (born 1951) is an Australian poet, editor and indexer.

== Background and education ==
Edgar was born in 1951 in Sydney, where he attended the prestigious Sydney Technical High School. After time spent living in London, he later returned to Australia, going on to study classics and librarianship at the University of Tasmania.

== Poetry ==
His first published poetry appeared in 1979 in the Tasmanian literary quarterly Island (originally The Tasmanian Review). From 1986 to the present he has been subeditor of Island and was poetry editor between 1989 and 1994. He is the author of seven books of poetry.

As well as extensive publication of his verse in print media, Stephen Edgar has published poetry in online poetry magazines such as Snorkel, The Poetry Foundation, The Chimaera, and The Flea.

As poet Kevin Hart observed, Edgar "is distinctive for a firm commitment to closed forms and for showing considerable panache in handling them".

Other critical material on Stephen Edgar includes a close reading by Clive James of Edgar's "Man on the Moon" in the Poetry Foundation's online magazine.

Edgar's Eldershaw (2013) was shortlisted for the Queensland Literary Awards (2013) and the Prime Minister's Literary Awards (2014).

== Awards ==
- 1984 – Harri Jones Memorial Prize for Poetry
- 2003 – Grace Leven Prize for Poetry and William Baylebridge Memorial Prize (for Lost in the Foreground)
- 2005 – Australian Book Review Poetry Prize (for his poem "Man on the Moon")
- 2006 – Philip Hodgins Memorial Medal for an outstanding contribution to Australian literature, at the Mildura Writers' Festival.
- 2009 – William Baylebridge Memorial Prize (for History of the Day)
- 2011 – Dorothy Porter Poetry Prize (co-winner, for the poem 'All Eyes')
- 2013 – Australian Catholic University Literature Award (for the poem 'The Dancer')
- 2014 – Colin Roderick Award (co-winner, for Eldershaw)
- 2021 – Prime Minister's Literary Award for Poetry, The Strangest Place: New and selected poems

== Bibliography ==
- Queuing for the Mudd Club (Hobart, Twelvetrees Publishing Company, 1985, ISBN 0-9590082-0-9)
- Ancient Music (Sydney, Angus and Robertson, 1988, ISBN 0-207-15698-0)
- Corrupted Treasures (Melbourne, William Heinemann Australia, 1995, ISBN 0-85561-545-1)
- Where the Trees Were (Canberra, Indigo/Ginninderra Press, 1999, ISBN 1-74027-013-4)
- Lost in the Foreground (Sydney, Duffy and Snellgrove, 2003, ISBN 1-876631-64-3; reprinted Warners Bay, Picaro Press, 2008, ISBN 978-1-920957-53-7)
- Other Summers (Melbourne, Black Pepper publishing, 2006, ISBN 1-876044-54-3)
- Photography for Beginners (Compact Disc, Spit Junction, River Road Press, 2007, ISBN 978-0-9804148-2-0)
- History of the Day (Melbourne, Black Pepper publishing, 2009, ISBN 978-1-876044-62-6)
- The Red Sea: New & Selected Poems (Fort Worth, Baskerville Publishers, 2012, ISBN 978-1-880909-78-2)
- Eldershaw (Melbourne, Black Pepper publishing, 2013, ISBN 978-1-876044-78-7)
- Exhibits of the Sun (Melbourne, Black Pepper publishing, 2014, ISBN 978-1-876044-88-6)
- The Strangest Place: New and selected poems (Melbourne, Black Pepper publishing, 2020, ISBN 978-0-648038-74-0)
- Ghosts of Paradise (Sydney: Pitt Street Poetry, 2023, ISBN 978-1-922776-12-9)
- Imaginary Archive (Sydney: Pitt Street Poetry, 2025, ISBN 978-1-922776-24-2)

== See also ==
- List of Australian poets
