= Marten Bequest =

Australian charitable trust

The Marten Bequest is an Australian charitable trust, from which scholarships are awarded by the Australia Council for the Arts on behalf of the trustee, Perpetual Limited. The scholarships are known as the Marten Bequest Travelling Scholarship or just Marten Bequest Scholarship. The trust was formed from the estate of John Chisholm Marten (1908–1966).

== John Marten ==
John Chisholm Marten (1908–1966), (Note: UK General Register Office records his name thus at birth, July–September quarter, 2008, Dartford district.) who used Jon Marten as his stage and pen name, was born in the county of Kent, England, migrating to Australia at a young age and living in Sydney for most of his adult life. He trained in Spanish dancing in Spain, before returning to Britain to serve in the merchant navy during World War II. He took up dancing again with Californian dancer Doris Nile, and appeared in a royal gala performance at the Tivoli Theatre, Sydney, in 1954. when Queen Elizabeth II visited Australia. His career was as a performing artist.

Marten co-wrote The Bali Ballet Murders with Cornelius Conyn, which was published in Australia, London and also translated into Dutch and published in the Netherlands. He was also known for his philanthropy and support of the arts.

Marten established the trust in order to help young creative artists in several disciplines to pay for their training and study programs.

== History ==
The first scholarships were awarded in 1975, when three scholarships were awarded, for ballet, singing and instrumental music.

In 2013, the scholarships were worth A$20,000 each, awarded in nine categories, bring the total prize pool to A$220,000. In 2017, there were 12 scholarships across six categories on offer, worth a total of A$600,000. Perpetual Limited has been the trustee since 2014.

== Scholarships ==
Administered by the Australia Council, the trust operates as a scholarship fund for various types of creators in the arts, including acting, architecture, ballet, instrumental music, painting, poetry, prose, sculpture and singing. Open to Australian citizens aged between 21 and 35 (or 17–35 for ballet), as of 2022 the scholarships are worth A$50,000, and are paid over two years in instalments.

The number of recipients has varied each year. In 2022 there were seven winners.

== Selected winners ==
Many notable Australian creatives have won Marten Bequest Travelling Scholarships, including:

- Helen Lochhead (1982), architect
- Wendy Sharpe (1986), painter
- Tim Winton (1987), writer
- Bronwyn Oliver (1989), sculptor
- Susan Lyons (1992), actress
- Robert Clinch (1993), painter
- Delia Falconer (1997), writer
- Suneeta Peres da Costa (2002), writer
- Rachael Coopes (2004), actress
- Anthony White (2007), painter
- Eryn Jean Norvill (2015), actress
- Abdul Abdullah (2021), painter
- Dženana Vucic (2022), writer

A full list of past winners can be found on the Creative Australia website.
