= Elizabeth Todd =

British psychologist and academic

Elizabeth Sarah Todd
- Education: Newcastle University
- Scientific career
- Workplaces: Newcastle University
- Thesis: The problematic of partnership in the assessment of special educational needs (2000)

Elizabeth Sarah Todd is a British psychologist who is Professor of Educational Inclusion and Director of the Institute for Social Science at Newcastle University. She has studied the interaction between schools and their local communities, and how young people engage with societal agendas. She was elected a Fellow of the Academy of Social Sciences in 2020 and appointed an Officer of the Order of the British Empire in the 2025 New Year Honours.

== Early life and education ==
Todd studied psychology as an undergraduate. One of her master's degree placements was in Edinburgh, where she worked with Jimmy Boyle on projects that help people reintegrate into society following time in prison. She worked as a mathematics teacher at the St Paul's Catholic College, and as an educational psychologist with the local authorities of Northumberland and Tyneside, developing video interaction guidance to improve connections between people. Todd eventually returned to academia to complete her doctoral research. She earned her doctorate in education, researching assessment in special education needs.

== Research and career ==
Todd was a lecturer at the University of the South Pacific, where she worked in critical education psychology. She trained teachers from Pacific Island countries. At Newcastle University, Todd serves as Director of the Institute for Social Science.

Todd was involved with the Children North East's Poverty Proofing scheme, which investigated and attempted to eliminate the impact of poverty on school-aged children. She developed Tyne and Wear Citizens, a chapter of Citizens UK, which advocated for a real living wage.

During the COVID-19 pandemic, Todd became interested in the experiences of young people and the impact for children in poverty. She studied the experiences of children aged 5 to 18, and found that children missed their friends and worried about families.

== Awards and honours ==
- 2000 Elected a Fellow of the Academy of Social Science
- 2025 Appointed an Officer of the Order of the British Empire

== Selected publications ==
- Todd, Liz Elizabeth; Higgins, Steve (1998). "Powerlessness in Professional and Parent Partnerships". British Journal of Sociology of Education. 19 (2): 227–236. doi:10.1080/0142569980190205. Wikidata Q132399378.
- Cummings, Colleen; Dyson, Alan; Liz, Todd. Beyond the School Gates: Can Full Service and Extended Schools Overcome Disadvantage?. Routledge. p. 152. ISBN 9780415548755.
- Alan Dyson; Todd, Liz Elizabeth (2010). "Dealing with complexity: theory of change evaluation and the full service extended schools initiative". International Journal of Research and Method in Education. 33 (2): 119–134. doi:10.1080/1743727x.2010.484606. Wikidata Q111205317.
