= Cassandra Pybus =

Australian historian and writer (born 1947)

Cassandra Pybus FAHA
- Born: Cassandra Jean Pybus; 29 September 1947 (age 79); Hobart, Tasmania, Australia
- Education: University of Sydney
- Occupations: Historian; biographer; academic
- Writing career
- Language: English
- Notable awards: Colin Roderick Award (1993); National Biography Award (2021)

Cassandra Jean Pibus FAHA (born 29 September 1947) is an Australian historian and writer. She is a former professorial fellow in history at the University of Sydney, and has published extensively on Australian and American history.

Pybus was born in Hobart, Tasmania and educated at North Sydney Girls High School and the University of Sydney. Her mother, Betty Pybus, was a pioneer of women's health in Sydney and Tasmania.

From 1989 to 1994, Pybus was editor of the literary magazine Island. She won the Colin Roderick Award in 1993 for Gross Moral Turpitude, a re-examination of the case of Sydney Sparkes Orr, a Northern Irish academic who became embroiled in a scandal involving a relationship with a student whilst working at the University of Tasmania. In 2000, she won an Adelaide Festival Award for Literature for The Devil and James McAuley, a biography of the poet James McAuley.

Pybus was awarded the Centenary Medal in 2001 for outstanding contribution to Tasmanian and Australian literature and education.

In 2020 she was shortlisted for the Nonfiction Book Award at the Queensland Literary Awards for Truganini: Journey Through the Apocalypse and for the Nonfiction prize at the 2021 Indie Book Awards as well as the 2021 Biography book of the year at the Australian Book Industry Awards with Truganini. In August 2021 she won the National Biography Award with Truganini, while in November 2021 she was elected a Fellow of the Australian Academy of the Humanities.

Her 2024 book, A Very Secret Trade, was shortlisted for the 2025 Victorian Premier's Prize for Nonfiction.

== Books ==
- A Very Secret Trade: The Dark Story of Gentlemen Collectors in Tasmania (2024)
- Truganini: Journey Through the Apocalypse (2020)
- Enterprising Women: Gender Race and Power in the Revolutionary Atlantic (with Kit Candlin; 2015)
- Other Middle Passages (edited with Marcus Rediker and Emma Christopher; 2007)
- Epic Journeys of Freedom: Runaway slaves of the American Revolution and their global quest for liberty (2006)
- Black Founders: The unknown story of Australia's first black settlers (2006)
- The Woman who Walked to Russia: A writer's search for a lost legend (2002)
- American Citizens, British Slaves: Yankee political prisoners in an Australian penal colony, 1839–1850 (with Hamish Maxwell-Stewart; 2002)
- Raven Road (2001)
- The Devil and James McAuley (1999)
- Till Apples Grow on an Orange Tree (1998)
- White Rajah: A Dynastic Intrigue (1996)
- Gross Moral Turpitude: The Orr Case Reconsidered (1993)
- Community of Thieves (1991)
