= Yves Rees =

Australian history researcher

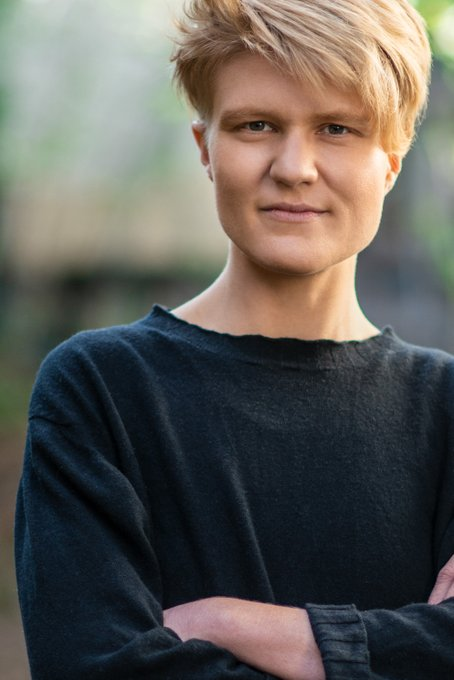
- Born: 11 March 1988 (age 38)
- Education: Australian National University, University College London, University of Melbourne
- Occupations: Researcher; historian
- Awards: Calibre Essay Prize (2020)
- Academic career
- Fields: Transgender history
- Institutions: La Trobe University (2017–)
- Website: www.yvesrees.com

Yves Rees is an Australian researcher in Australian history, best known for their work on gender, transnational and economic history, as well as writings on contemporary transgender identity, and politics.

== Early life and education ==
Rees received their undergraduate Bachelor of Arts Honors degree in history at the University of Melbourne (2009), Master of Arts in history at University College London (2011), and completed their PhD, entitled, "Travelling to Tomorrow: Australian Women in the United States, 1910-1960" at Australian National University (2016). Their supervisor was Angela Woollacott.

== Career and impact ==
Rees started work at University of Sydney in 2016 as the Kathleen Fitzpatrick Junior Research Fellow and subsequently before moving to La Trobe University in 2017 as the David Myers Research Fellow. As of 2020, they are a lecturer in La Trobe University's history department. They are a board member of the History Council of Victoria and co-convenor of the Melbourne Feminist History Group.

They are also active in academic outreach, contributing to ABC radio and The Conversation, and co-hosting a history podcast called Archive Fever which they co-host with Clare Wright.

Rees became known for their discussion of trans and topics relating to gender through an autobiographical lens.

== Awards and honours ==
- Rees won the Calibre essay prize in 2020.
- Rees won the Serle Award Winner in 2018.

== Works ==
- Anna Clark; Yves Rees; Alecia Simmonds, eds. (2017), Transnationalism, Nationalism and Australian History, Singapore: Springer, Singapore, doi:10.1007/978-981-10-5017-6, OCLC 993774742, OL 37276257M, Wikidata Q58213280
- Sam Elkin; Yves Rees; Tiffany Jones, eds. (1 June 2021), Bent Street 5.1: Soft Borders, Hard Edges, Melbourne: Clouds of Magellan, OCLC 1258217245, Wikidata Q109405827
- Yves Rees (2021), All about Yves : notes from a transition, Sydney, OCLC 1267767962, Wikidata Q109406050
- Sam Elkin; Alex Gallagher; Yves Rees; Bobuq Sayed (2022) Nothing to Hide: Voices of Trans and Gender Diverse Australia
- Yves Rees (2024) Travelling to Tomorrow: The modern women who sparked Australia's romance with America
