= Andrew Sant =

Australian poet

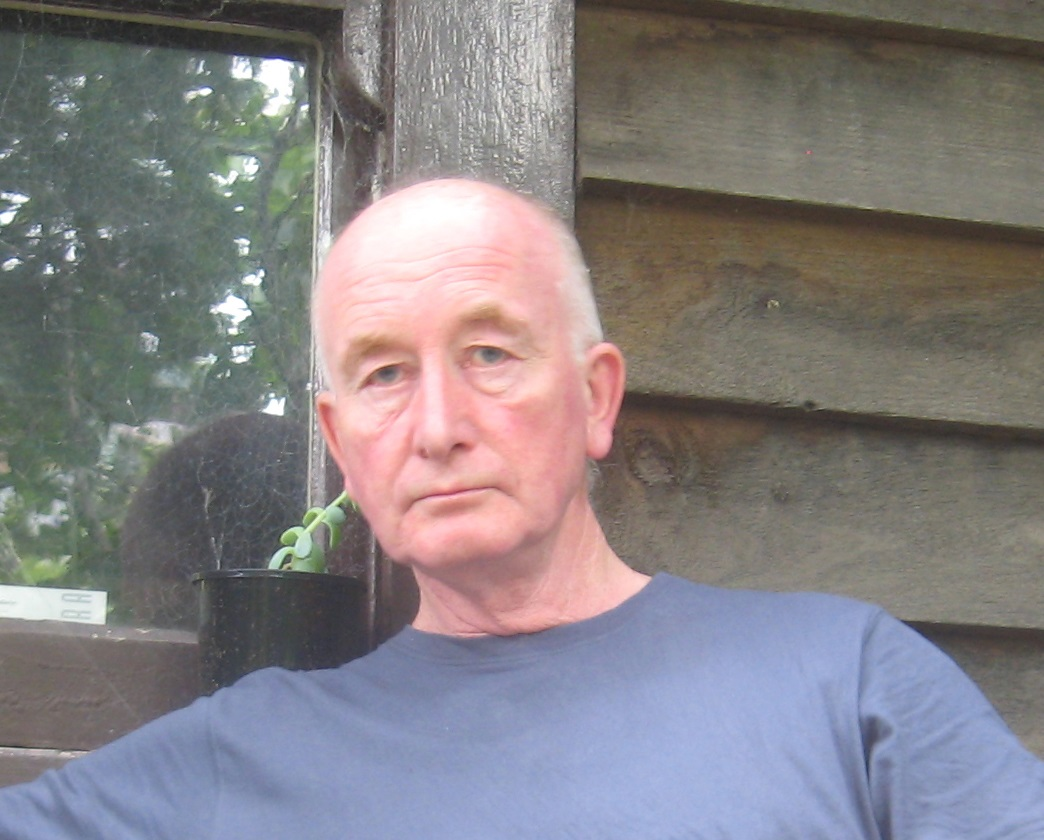
- Andrew Sant
- Born: 1950 (age 75–76); London, England
- Occupation: Poet

Andrew Sant (born 1950) is an English-born Australian poet, essayist, and former editor.

In 1962 Sant moved from London, where he was born, with his family to Melbourne where he finished his formal education. He has since lived in London for periods, particularly between the years 2002–2016. In 2001 he was resident at the University of Peking in Beijing, China. In the early nineties he was resident in the Australia Council-administered B R Whiting studio in Rome.

He co-founded, in 1979, the major Australian literary magazine, Island, based in Tasmania, where by that time he had moved. He served as an editor for ten years. Other occupations have included teaching at both secondary and tertiary levels, teaching literacy to the unemployed and to prisoners, managing a hostel for juvenile offenders, copywriting and, as part-owner of a small Tasmanian company, cider making.

His poems have appeared individually in The Times Literary Supplement, Poetry, Poetry London, The Australian, The Age, and Antipodes, among many other publications, and in major anthologies of Australian poetry.

Sant has been described as a "distinctive and distinguished poet" in Australian Book Review. He is also the author of a number of published essays which have appeared in the annual Best Australian Essays anthology and collected in How to Proceed of which The Times Literary Supplement said, "There is a wonderfully digressive quality ... His syntax follows suit: sentences balloon across lines, the subject weaving in and out of focus as his mind travels around it. There are moments of sparkling poetic clarity." He is a recipient of the Centenary Medal. Sant has been invited to read his work in numerous countries including Canada, Germany, Italy, Sweden, New Zealand and, often, the UK.

== Bibliography ==
=== Poetry ===
==== Collections ====
- Lives (Angus and Robertson, 1980)
- The Caught Sky (Angus and Robertson, Sydney, 1982)
- The Flower Industry (Angus and Robertson, Sydney, 1985)
- Brushing the Dark (William Heinemann, Melbourne, 1989)
- Album of Domestic Exiles (Black Pepper publishing, Melbourne, 1996)
- Russian Ink (Black Pepper publishing, Melbourne, 2002)
- The Islanders (Shoestring Press, Nottingham UK, 2001)
- The Unmapped Page - Selected Poems (Arc, UK, 2004)
- Tremors: New & Selected Poems (Black Pepper publishing, Melbourne, 2004)
- Speed & Other Liberties (Salt Publishing, Cambridge, UK, 2008)
- The Lives and Times of the Islanders (Shoestring Press, Nottingham UK, 2008)
- Fuel (Black Pepper, Melbourne, 2009)
- Days of Incompletion and Other Poems (Picaro Press, 2009)
- The Bicycle Thief (Picaro Press, Warner's Bay, NSW, 2009) chapbook
- The Bicycle Thief & Other Poems (Black Pepper publishing, Melbourne, 2013)
- Baffling Gravity (Shoestring Press/Puncher & Wattmann, 2019)
- Near the Border - New & Selected Poems (Shoestring Press, 2022/ Puncher & Wattmann 2023)
- Natural Wonders (Puncher & Wattmann 2025)

==== Selected list of poems ====
Title	Year	First published	Reprinted/collected
Mood piece	2014	Sant, Andrew (Autumn 2014). "Mood piece". Meanjin. 73 (1): 93.	

=== Essays ===
- How to Proceed (Shoestring Press, Notts, UK, 2015) (Puncher & Wattmann, Sydney, 2016)
- The Hallelujah Shadow (Shoestring Press/Puncher & Wattmann 2020)

=== Anthologies ===
- First Rights - a Decade of Island Magazine (Greenhouse Publications, Melbourne, 1989)
- Toads (Allen and Unwin, Melbourne, 1992)
