= Calibre Prize =

Australian essay award

The Calibre Essay Prize is an annual Australian Book Review essay-writing award. The prize, first awarded in 2007, is worth AU$7,500 and is deemed 'the nation's premier essay-writing competition' and 'Australia's leading award for an original essay'.

The prize is 'intended to generate brilliant new essays and to foster new insights into culture, society, and the human condition' and welcomes entries from published authors and commentators, as well as from emerging writers. All non-fiction subjects are eligible for submission.

== History ==
The Prize was established in 2007. It is presented annually by the ABR and 'awards the most outstanding original essay contributed by a leading Australian author or commentator'. The Prize was previously co-funded by the Australian Copyright Agency. It is currently supported by Colin Golvan QC.

== Winners ==
- 2007 – Elisabeth Elisabeth Holdsworth: "An die Nachgenborenen: For Those Who Come After"
- 2008 – Rachel Robertson: "Reaching One Thousand" and Mark Tredinnick: "A Storm and a Teacup"
- 2009 – Kevin Brophy: "What're yer looking at yer fuckin' dog: Violence and Fear in Žižek's Post-political Neighbourhood" and Jane Goodall: "Footprints"
- 2010 – Lorna Hallahan: "On Being Odd" and David Hansen: "Seeing Truganini"
- 2011 – Dean Biron: "The Death of the Writer" and Moira McKinnon: "Who Killed Matilda?"
- 2012 – Matt Rubinstein: "Body and Soul: Copyright and Law Enforcement in the Age of the Electronic Book"
- 2013 – Martin Thomas: "Because it's your country: Bringing Back the Bones to West Arnhem Land"
- 2014 – Christine Piper: "Unearthing the past"
- 2015 – Sophie Cunningham: "Staying with the trouble"
- 2016 – Michael Winkler: "The Great Red Whale"
- 2017 – Michael Adams: "Salt Blood"
- 2018 – Lucas Grainger-Brown: "We Three Hundred"
- 2019 – Grace Karskens: "Nah Doongh's Song"
- 2020 – Yves Rees: "Reading the Mess Backwards"
- 2021 – Theodore Ell: "Façades of Lebanon"
- 2022 – Simon Tedeschi: "This Woman My Grandmother"
- 2023 – Tracy Ellis: "Flow States"
- 2024 – Tracey Slaughter: "why your hair is long & your stories short"
- 2025 – Jeanette Mrozinski: "Eucharist"
- 2026 – Sahar Rabah: "Between Reality and Dreams"
