= Simon Tedeschi =

Simon Tedeschi AM
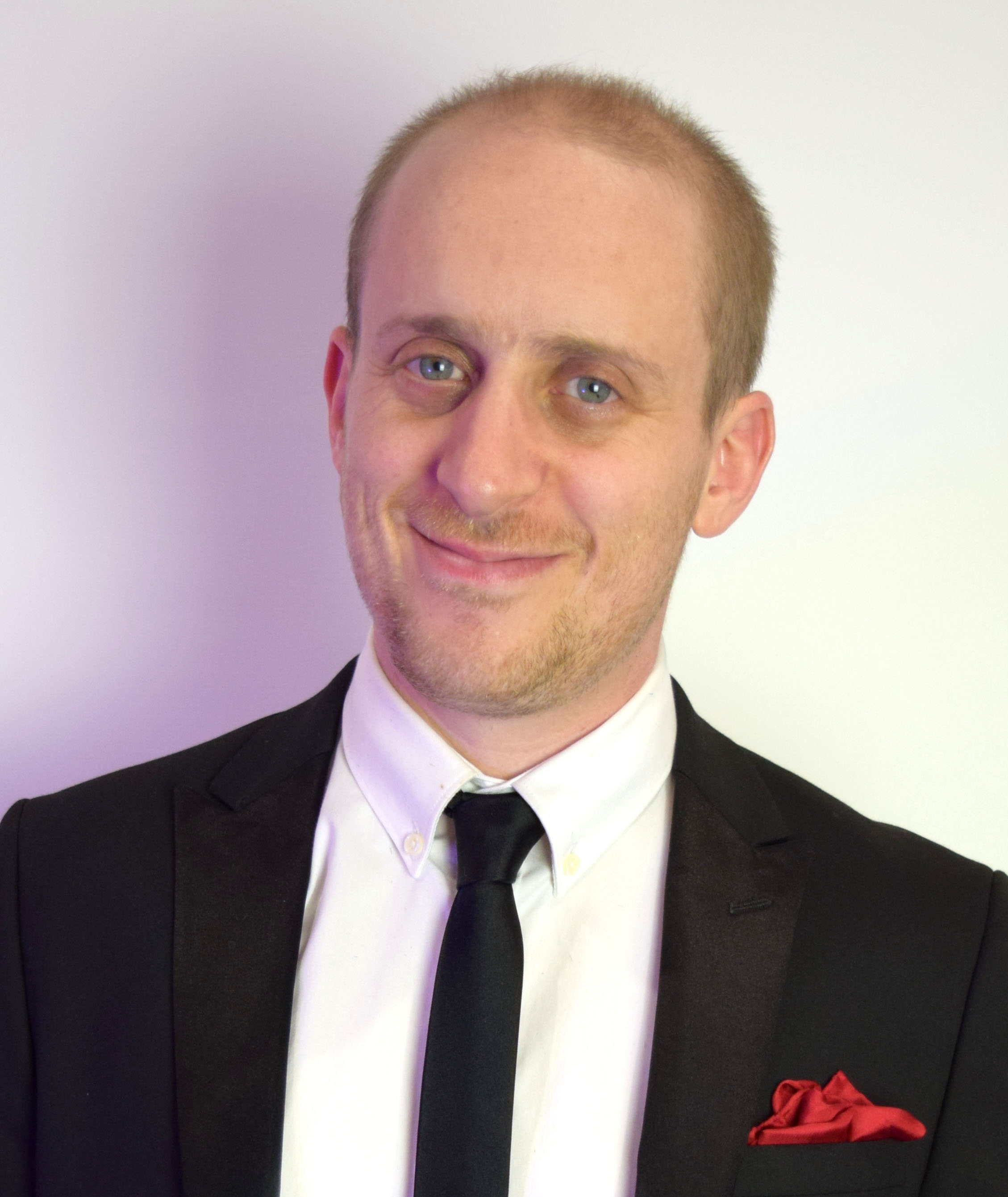

Background information
- Born: 1981 (age 44–45); Gosford, New South Wales, Australia
- Occupation: Pianist
- Website: simontedeschi.com

Simon Tedeschi AM (born 1981) is an Australian classical pianist and writer.

== Early life and education ==
Simon (Alexander Meir (Note: Hebrew: מֵאִיר)) Tedeschi was born in 1981 in Gosford to Mark Tedeschi QC, Senior Crown Prosecutor for New South Wales, and doctor Vivienne Tedeschi, the daughter of a Polish Holocaust survivor, Lucy Gershwin.

Raised in a Jewish household, he grew up on the North Shore of Sydney and attended Beaumont Road Public School in West Killara and St Andrew's Cathedral School in Sydney, where the headmaster discouraged him from taking part in sports lest he damage his hands.

His teachers were Neta Maughan in Australia, Noretta Conci in England, and Peter Serkin in the United States.

When he was 9 years old, Tedeschi performed Mozart's Piano Concerto No. 19, K.459 in the Sydney Opera House. At age 13, he played for Luciano Pavarotti.

== Career ==
Tedeschi signed with Sony Music Australia in 2000. His debut CD, Simon Tedeschi, was nominated for at the ARIA Music Awards of 2000 for Best Classical Album. In 2004 he recorded Tchaikovsky's 1st Piano Concerto and Grieg's Piano Concerto with the Queensland Symphony Orchestra with Richard Bonynge. His album, Grieg / Tchaikovsky – Piano Concertos, peaked at No. 12 on the ARIA Classical chart in October 2005.

In November 2012 he released his next album, Gershwin and Me (Universal Music Group/ABC), which reached No. 4 on the ARIA Classical, No. 5 on the ARIA Hitseekers Albums, No. 68 on the ARIA Top 100 Physical Albums charts in January 2013. In that year, a follow-up album, Gershwin Take 2, by Tedeschi with James Morrison and Sarah McKenzie was issued. It received two ARIA Award nominations in 2014 for Virginia Read's work as engineer and producer.

He released a recording of Mussorgsky's Pictures at an Exhibition for ABC/Universal and performed Rachmaninoff's Piano concerto no. 4 with the Sydney Symphony Orchestra.

=== Media ===
He appeared regularly on the TV show Spicks and Specks on ABC TV, and he participated in the Oscar-winning movie Shine, where he played the hands of David Helfgott.

=== Writing ===
In 2022, Tedeschi published his first book entitled Fugitive, an unclassifiable work encompassing prose poetry, philosophy, memoir, meditation, aphorism and essay; the title is a reference to Prokofiev's collection of piano miniatures, Visions fugitives. It was shortlisted for the 2023 Victorian Premier's Prize for Poetry. In May 2022, Tedeschi was announced as the winner of the Australian Book Review's Calibre Prize for his essay "This woman my grandmother". Fugitive was shortlisted for the Judith Wright Calanthe Award for a Poetry Collection at the 2023 Queensland Literary Awards.

=== Work for children ===
He played the role of Mozart in Sydney Opera House's Babies Proms, and performed a show based on his childhood, Simon Tedeschi: Pianist and Prankster at the Monkey Baa Theatre Company.

== Discography ==
Title	Details
Simon Tedeschi	Released: 2000; Format: CD; Label:
Piano Concertos: Tchaikovsky, Grieg (with The Queensland Orchestra & Richard Bonynge)	Released: 2006; Format: CD; Label:
Simon Tedeschi & Ian Cooper (with Ian Cooper)	Released: 2008; Format: Label:
Gershwin & Me	Released: 2012; Format: CD, Digital; Label: ABC Classics (ABC 481 0032)
Mozart: Piano Concerto No. 23, KV488 (with Tasmanian Symphony Orchestra & Alexander Briger)	Released: 2013; Format: CD, Digital; Label: ABC Classics (ABC 481 0189)
Gershwin & Me: Take Two	Released: 2013; Format: CD, Digital; Label: ABC Classics (ABC 481 0629)
Tender Earth: Australian Music for Piano	Released: 2014; Format: CD, Digital; Label: ABC Classics (ABC 481 0960)
Enoch Arden (with Alfred Tennyson, Richard Strauss & John Bell)	Released: 2017; Format: CD, Digital; Label: ABC Classics (ABC 481 5558)
A Winter's Tale (with Roger Benedict)	Released: 2018; Format: CD, Digital; Label: ABC Classics (ABC 481 6751)

== Awards and honours ==
Tedeschi was awarded the ABC Young Performer of the Year in 1998, performing the Ginastera Piano Concerto no. 1 with the Melbourne Symphony Orchestra under the baton of Jun Märkl.

He was the winner of the top prize in the keyboard section of the Royal Over-Seas League Music Competition in London (2002).

In January 2001 Tedeschi was awarded a Centenary of Federation Medal with a citation, "For service as a Young Australian of the Year Finalist."

In the 2026 King's Birthday Honours List, Tedeschi was made a Member of the Order of Australia (AM) for significant services to music as a concert pianist.

=== ARIA Music Awards ===
The ARIA Music Awards is an annual awards ceremony that recognises excellence, innovation, and achievement across all genres of Australian music. They commenced in 1987.

Year	Nominee / work	Award	Result	Ref.
2000	Simon Tedeschi	Best Classical Album	Nominated	
2006	Piano Concertos: Tchaikovsky, Grieg (with The Queensland Orchestra & Richard Bonynge)	Best Classical Album	Nominated	
2014	Virginia Read for Gershwin: Take Two	Engineer of the Year	Nominated	
2014	Virginia Read for Gershwin: Take Two	Producer of the Year	Nominated	
2023	Debussy – Ravel (with Roger Benedict)	Best Classical Album	Nominated	
