= National Biography Award =

Australian literary award

The National Biography Award, established in Australia in 1996, is awarded for the best published work of biographical or autobiographical writing by an Australian. It aims "to encourage the highest standards of writing biography and autobiography and to promote public interest in those genres". It was initially awarded every two years, but from 2002 it has been awarded annually. Its administration was taken over by the State Library of New South Wales in 1998.

== History ==
The National Biography Award was originally endowed by private benefactor, Geoffrey Cains, and the original prize money was $12,500. In 2002, Cains said of endowing the award that "I wanted to give back to literature something, it had given me so much; besides, philanthropy in this country is so overlooked and diminished". In 2005, the prize money was increased to $20,000 with the support of Michael Crouch. Belinda Hutchinson, former President of the Library Council of NSW, expressed gratitude for this increase to "an award that celebrates the Australian psyche through distinguished biography writing."

In 2012 the prize money for the Award has been increased to $25,000. Since 2013, each shortlisted author receives $1,000. The judging panel varies from year to year. In 2018 the Michael Crouch Award was introduced for an Australian writer's first published biography.

The shortlist is announced in early July each year, followed by the winner announcement in early August.

== Winners ==
Year	Author	Title	Ref.
2026	Helen Ennis	Max Dupain: A Portrait	
2025	Abbas El-Zein	Bullet, Paper, Rock: A Memoir of Words and Wars	
2024	Lamisse Hamouda	The Shape of Dust: a father wrongly imprisoned. A daughter's quest to free him	
2023	Ann-Marie Priest	My Tongue Is My Own: A Life of Gwen Harwood	
2022	Bernadette Brennan	Leaping into Waterfalls: The Enigmatic Gillian Mears	
2021	Cassandra Pybus	Truganini: Journey Through the Apocalypse	
2020	Patrick Mullins	Tiberius with a Telephone: The Life and Stories of William McMahon	
2019	Behrouz Boochani	No Friend But the Mountains: Writing from Manus Prison	
2018	Judith Brett	The Enigmatic Mr Deakin	
2017	Tom D C Roberts	Before Rupert: Keith Murdoch and the Birth of a Dynasty	
2016	Brenda Niall	Mannix	
2015	Philip Butterss	An Unsentimental Bloke: The Life and Work of C J Dennis	
2014	Alison Alexander	The Ambitions of Jane Franklin: Victorian Lady Adventurer	
2013	Peter Fitzpatrick	The Two Frank Thrings	
2012	Martin Thomas	The Many Worlds of R. H. Mathews: In Search of an Australian Anthropologist	
2011	Alasdair McGregor	Grand Obsessions: The Life and Work of Walter Burley Griffin and Marion Mahony Griffin	
2010	Brian Matthews	Manning Clark: A Life	
2009	Ann Blainey	I am Melba	
2008	Philip Dwyer	Napoleon, 1769-1799: The Path to Power	
2008	Graham Seal	These Few Lines: A Convict Story – The Lost Lives of Myra and William Sykes	
2007	Jacob Rosenberg	East of Time	
2006	John Hughes	The Idea of Home	
2005	Robert Hillman	The Boy in the Green Suit	
2004	Barry Hill	Broken Song: T.G.H. Strehlow and Aboriginal Possession	
2003	Peter Rose	Rose Boys	
2003	Don Watson	Recollections of a Bleeding Heart : a Portrait of Paul Keating PM	
2002	Jacqueline Kent	A Certain Style: Beatrice Davis, a Literary Life	
2000	Peter Robb	M, a biography of European painter Caravaggio	
2000	Mandy Sayer	Dreamtime Alice: a Memoir	
1998	Roberta Sykes	Snake Cradle	
1996	Abraham Biderman	The World of My Past	

== National Biography Award Lecture ==
In 2003, the National Biography Award lecture was instituted. It is associated with the award, and was also sponsored by Cains and Crouch. It is given annually, but takes place during the same week as the announcement of the winner.

Lectures included:

- 2018: Unauthorised, by Tom D C Roberts
- 2017: A tale finds its teller: writing the biography of Thea Astley, by Karen Lamb
- 2016: For better or worse: The relationship between biographer and subject, by Philip Butterss
- 2015: Biography and me: notes on the wonders of others (and some on self), by Kim Williams AM
- 2014: Based on a true story, by Linda Jaivin
- 2013: A different perspective, a shared story, by John Elder Robison
- 2012: Looking for Eliza by Evelyn Juers
- 2011: Recollections of a Bleeding Heart: A Portrait of Paul Keating PM, by Don Watson
- 2010: Biography: The Art of the Impossible, by Hilary McPhee AO
- 2009: ‘Truth’ as applied to biography and autobiography, by Raimond Gaita
- 2008: Biography, Autobiography and Memoir: Presidential Bests and Worsts, by Bob Carr
- 2007: Biography: The Impossible Art, by Inga Clendinnen
- 2006: Materials for Life: The Enduring Value of Biography, by Robyn Archer
- 2005: Personal Drama: David Williamson on Self-depiction, by David Williamson
- 2004: The Observed of all Observers: Biography in Poetry, by Peter Porter (poet)
- 2003: Goethe's Two Left Feet: Reflections on the Hazards and Liberties of Biography, by Peter Rose (writer)
