= Charles A. Woolley =

Australian photographer

- Born: 17 December 1834; Hobart Town, Van Diemen's Land
- Died: 1922 (aged 87–88); Hobart Town
- Occupations: Photographer, sketcher
- Years active: 1859 to 1870
- Known for: Photographic portraits
- Notable work: Trugannini

Charles Alfred Woolley (17 December 1834 – 1922) was born in Hobart Town, Van Diemen's Land. He was an Australian photographer but also created drawings, portraits and visual art. He is best known for his 1866 photographic portraits of the five surviving Aboriginal Tasmanians from Oyster Cove, that were exhibited at the Intercolonial Exhibition of Australasia colonial exhibition in Melbourne the same year.

== Life ==
Woolley and his elder brother were the sons of Joseph William Woolley (1797–1880) and Frances née Facy. Joseph was a cabinetmaker who worked in a studio next to his father's upholstery and carpet warehouse. The studio was on 42 Macquarie Street. Charles Woolley was married twice. The first of his two marriages took place on 19 July 1866 to Ada, the eldest daughter of C. H. Huxtable of Elphinstone Road, Hobart Town. Woolley's second marriage came almost a decade later on 13 July 1876 to Harriett Elizabeth the second daughter of George Burn of Hobart Town. He died in 1922 in Hobart Town.

== Works ==
From 1859 to 1870, he worked in a studio in Macquarie Street in Hobart generating various portraits as well as In his early work he used wet-plate to photograph Hobart and surrounding areas producing stereotypes. When Woolley travelled he did not take a darkroom tent with him to the forests. Instead he scavenged caravans and travelled regularly to produce wet-plate landscapes.

One of his typical photographs was a Tasmanian shot "Rocking Stone, on Mount Wellington" (1859) a stereograph which was printed in sepia on an 8in. X 7in. (71mm. X 68mm.) stereo card, was included in Alfred Abbott's Album of views of Hobart, Launceston and Victoria.

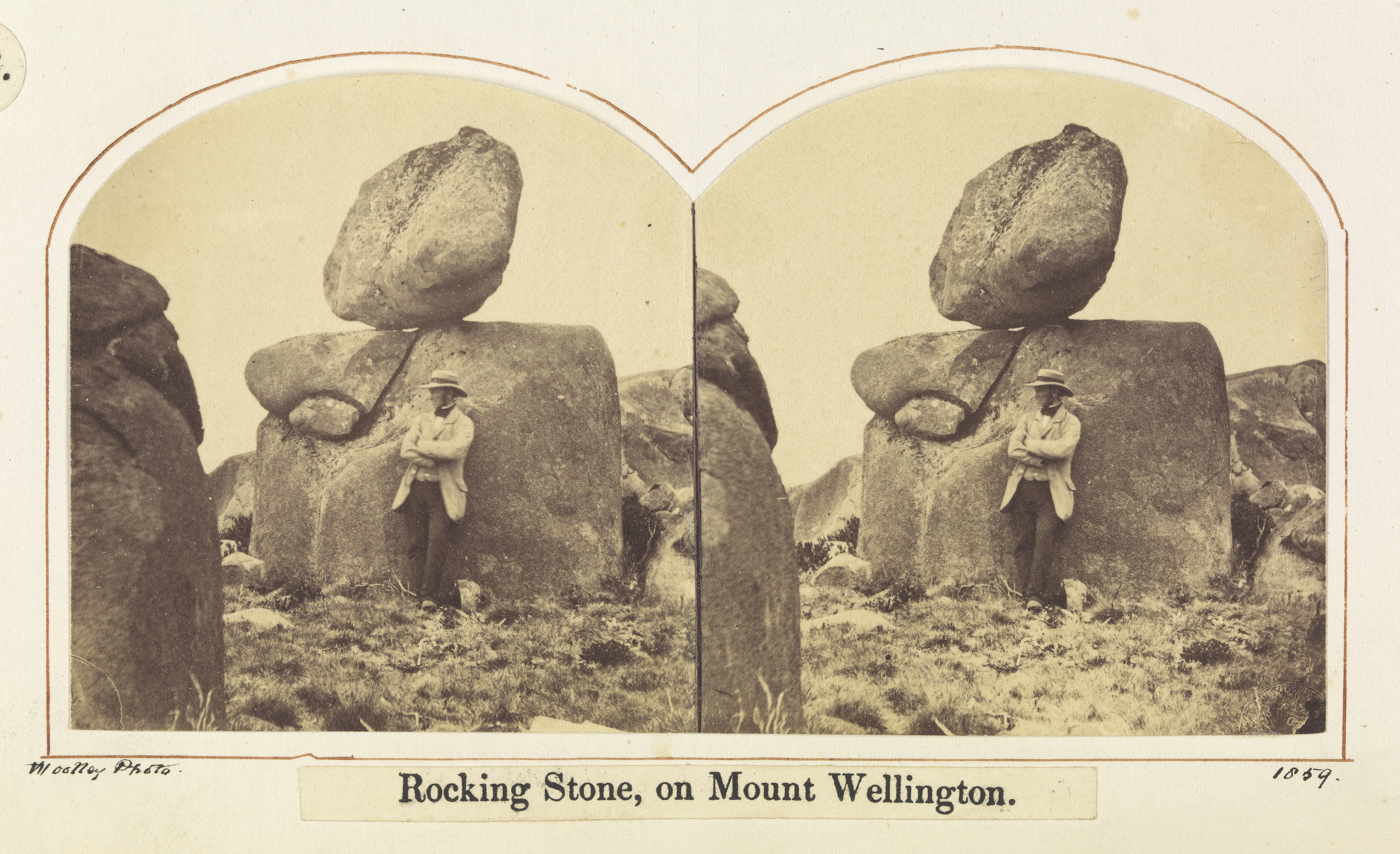
A Woolley photo, Rocking Stone on Mt. Wellington

Another wet-plate image, "The Old Theological Institute" was taken around the 1860s in Hobart Town, and can be found in the Archives Office of Tasmania. A woodcut made from his picture "Government House, Hobart Town" appeared in the Illustrated Melbourne Post in 1864.

Woolley, like most photographers of the day, took primarily portrait photographs. Numerous examples are extant including some overpainted with watercolours. According to Henry Button, Henry Dowling 's portrait of Sir Richard Dry, in the Queen Victoria Museum and Art Gallery, Launceston, Tasmania, was painted in England from a Woolley photograph. Less typical examples of his work include the seven published photographs Woolley took of four tableaux vivants designed and produced by Louisa Anne Meredith at Government House, Hobart Town, on 18 January 1866. A Thomas Wingate also took a photograph and all eight were published later that year as an album: Souvenir of the Masques of Christmas, and of the Old and New Year.

He also worked with Louisa Anne Meredith on the "First Tableau, left group" 1866. In his work "Second Tableau – Right Group" four men and a woman represent Australian industry: a gold-digger, vine-grower, reaper, and a shearer and gleaner. While most of Woolley’s photographs illustrate aspects of the festive season in the antipodes, he was one of the photographers appointed to photograph the Duke of Edinburgh's visit to Hobart Town in 1868.

In August 1866, Woolley took photographic portraits in his studio of the five surviving Oyster Cove Aboriginal people, which became his best known work. These were exhibited at the Intercolonial Exhibition of Australasia colonial exhibition in Melbourne later that year. Two of the portraits were of Truganini, a female, and William Lanne, also known as King Billy. As Helen Ennis notes:

A sympathetic response to Aboriginal people was...not dependent on the recognition of a shared humanity and the equality of different races, but on an appreciation of the plight of a race believed less evolved and doomed to extinction. Henry Frith and Charles Woolley keenly felt the momentousness of what they considered to be the final chapter in human evolution and history, as well as their own responsibility in creating an appropriately memorable record. The focus of their efforts was a small group of Tasmanian Aborigines believed to be the 'Last of the Race'. They were the survivors of the 3,000 to 4,000 Aborigines who were killed or died in the first few decades of white settlement. Frith and Woolley's photographs from the 1860s - among the finest produced during the nine-teenth century - are grand statements, technically superb and laden with gravitas.

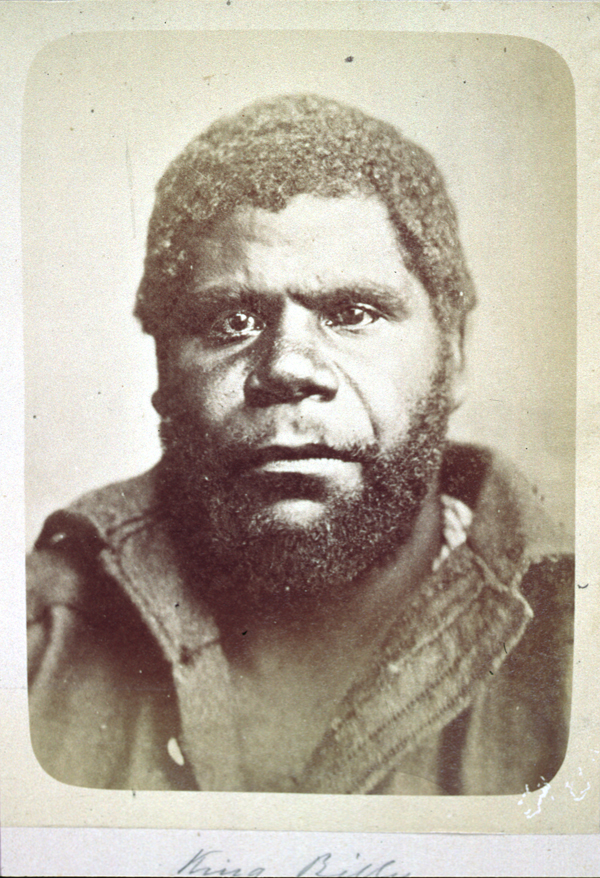
William Lanne

These works are now exhibited in the National Library, and the State Libraries of New South Wales, Tasmania and Victoria. James Bonwick's publication The Last of the Tasmanians (1870) included several of the photographs and shortly after engravings started to appear. Woolley exhibited the prints again in 1875 at the Victorian Intercolonial Exhibition. A few of the original sets survive, mainly in English collections, as well as copies that J. W. Beattie made.

After Lanne’s death in 1869, his grave was desecrated and his body mutilated and a full sized bust was produced by an artist named Francisco Santé. The Evening Mail advertised that it could be seen for a "small fee". Though Woolley was not known as a sculptor, the Hobart Town Examiner reported that "numerous" busts he had produced were at Walch and Sons and Birchall’s bookshops.

As Charles Woolley photographed Aboriginal people of different nations he highlighted the details of how each was different, mainly anatomically.

Woolley's "Trugannini" was produced as an engraving in the Atlas, the vignette form it took provided a visual metaphor for the fading out of the Tasmanian Aboriginal people.
