= Michael Farrell (poet) =

Australian poet (born 1965)

- Born: 1965 (age 60–61); Bombala, New South Wales, Australia
- Occupation: Poet
- Writing career
- Notable awards: Patrick White Literary Award, 2026

Michael Farrell (born 1965) is a contemporary Australian poet.

== Biography ==
Michael Farrell was born in Bombala, New South Wales in 1965. He presently lives in Melbourne, where he is the Australian editor of Slope magazine.

== Bibliography ==
=== Poetry ===
- I'cing : Eight Poems, Michael Graf, 1997
- living at the z, 2000
- Ode Ode, Salt Publishing, 2002
- Break Me Ouch, 3 Deep Publishing, 2006
- A Raiders Guide, Giramondo, 2008
- Thempark, BookThug, 2011
- Open Sesame, Giramondo, 2012
- Enjambment Sisters Present, Black Rider Press, 2013
- Cocky's Joy, Giramondo, 2015
- I Love Poetry, Giramondo, 2017 ISBN 978-1-925336-55-9
- Family Trees, Giramondo, 2020 ISBN 9781925818406
- Googlecholia, Giramondo, 2022

=== Short stories ===
- The Victoria Principle, Giramondo, 2025 ISBN 978-1-923106-30-7

=== Selected critical studies and reviews of Farrell's work ===
a raiders guide

- Leves, Kerry (Autumn 2009). "Caught in the melee we look for signals : new poetry". Overland. 194: 89–92.

== Awards ==
- Harri Jones Memorial Prize, 1999, winner
- The Age Book of the Year Poetry Prize Dinny O'Hearn Poetry Prize, 2003, shortlisted for Ode Ode
- Queensland Literary Awards, Judith Wright Calanthe Award for a Poetry Collection, 2018, winner for I Love Poetry
- NSW Premier's Literary Awards, Kenneth Slessor Prize for Poetry, 2019, shortlisted for I Love Poetry
- Queensland Literary Awards, Judith Wright Calanthe Award for a Poetry Collection, 2023, shortlisted for Googlecholia
- Patrick White Literary Award, 2026
