= And dug my fingers in the sand =

2000 poetry collection by Brook Emery

and dug my fingers in the sand
- Author: Brook Emery
- Language: English
- Genre: Poetry collection
- Publisher: Five Islands Press
- Publication date: 2000
- Publication place: Australia
- Media type: Print
- Pages: 110pp.
- ISBN: 0864186428
- Dewey Decimal: A821.4
- Followed by: Misplaced Heart

and dug my fingers in the sand (2000) is a collection of poetry by the Australian writer Brook Emery. (Note: "To get past big waves, swim underneath them ... In open water races competitive swimmers will hold the sea floor, digging their fingers into the sand and using this handhold to propel themselves forward underwater, letting the wave pass overhead. Holding on to the sea floor stabilises your position ... " (Kate Rew, "How to Swim under and through Waves", p.20 in Rew, Kate (2022), The Outdoor Swimmer's Handbook: Collected Wisdom on the Art, Sport and Science of Outdoor Swimming, Random House UK. ISBN 978-1-8460-4728-2))

== Contents ==
The collection contains 51 poems.

- "and dug my fingers in the sand"
- "King Lear at Nambucca Heads, 1988"
- "Seascape I"
- "Fruit Salad"
- "Infidelity"
- "Song of Songs 5 : 2"
- "Breathing and the Wind"
- "lithosphere"
- "Crossing The Border"
- "Demeter"
- "Pinball Rider"
- "Near Brooklyn"
- "Daylight Saving"
- "Improvising With Flaubert"
- "Cowboys"
- "My Father's Eyes"
- "Shellac"
- "With My Father-in-Law"
- "Abstract"
- "She"
- "A Twist Of Hemp"
- "The Distance and the Heat"
- "Interstices"
- "Postcards"
- "Driving Home"
- "Being done, there is no pause"
- "Learning to Dive"
- "Physical"
- "Approaching the Edge"
- "Imagined Seas"
- "Geometry"
- "Friday Night"
- "Interior with Windows"
- "What's Left Out"
- "April"
- "Flags crack and wrap"
- "Kato (HD - 1220)"
- "Rear Window"
- "any and all means"
- "Taking Stock"
- "The Next Step"
- "Three Feet"
- "Milgate's Dog"
- "Pure Mathematics"
- "Skink"
- "The Pelican Poem"
- "Beat Once More"
- "Letter to a Live Poet"
- "Underfoot"
- "feather, stone, bird, sand"
- "At A Slight Angle"
- "Then I saw a new heaven and a new earth"

=== Awards ===
- 1998 – The Denis Butler Memorial Award, for the poem The Distance and the Heat.
- 1999 – The Australian Sports Poetry Award, for the poem Physical.
- 1999 – $15,000 Newcastle Poetry Prize, for the poem Approaching the Edge.
- 2000 – Second Prize, Fellowship of Australian Writers' Anne Elder Poetry Award (for a first book of poetry) for his collection and dug my fingers in the sand.
- 2001 – $15,000 Judith Wright Calanthe Award for Poetry, Queensland Premier's Literary Awards for the collection and dug my fingers in the sand.

Also, another four of the collection's items had been recognized:

- "Postcards" — runner up, 1999 Banjo Paterson Writing Award.
- "lithosphere" — commended, 1999 Robert Harris Ulitarra Poetry Prize.
- "any and all means" — commended, 1998 Tom Collins Poetry Prize.
- "Imagined Seas" — short-listed, 1998 Josephine Ulrick Poetry Prize.

== Critical reception ==
The collection has been reviewed.

== See also ==
- 2000 in Australian literature
- 2000 in poetry
