= Griffith University Josephine Ulrick Poetry Prize =

Australian poetry award

The Josephine Ulrick Poetry Prize is an award given to Australian poets for a single poem. The initial prize was awarded at the Somerset Celebration of Literature literary dinner in Surfers Paradise, Queensland, Australia in March 1998. The prize was created by Win Schubert, Director of Art Galleries Schubert at the Gold Coast, in celebration of the dynamic life of her gallery manager and close friend, Josephine Ulrick. From 1998 until 2000, the Prize was managed by the Somerset Celebration of Literature, then from 2001 to 2003 it moved to the University of Queensland, Ulrick being a former student of that university. It then became a part of the Creative Writing program at Griffith University, Gold Coast, in Queensland. Starting in 2013, the Arts, Education and Law Group at Griffith University funded the award fully, and the name was changed to the Griffith University Josephine Ulrick Poetry Prize. The award has not been made since 2016.

== Winners ==
Winners of the Josephine Ulrick Poetry Prize (1998–2012) and the Griffith University Josephine Ulrick Poetry Prize (2013–2016):

Year	Result	Recipients
1998	Winner	Roland Leach
1999	Winner	Jean Kent
2000	Winner	Kathryn Lomer
2001	Winner	Anthony Lawrence
2001	Runners-up	Jan Kapelas, Jean Kent, Ronn Morris and Jan Owen
2002	Winner	Judy Johnson
2002	Highly Commended	Ted Nielse and Patricia Sykes
2003	Winner	Judith Beveridge
2003	Highly Commended	Adrienne Eberhard
2004	Winner	Nathan Shepherdson
2004	Runners-up	Nicholas Grapsias and Lauren Williams
2005	Winner	Christine Fontana
2005	Runners-up	Robert Adamson and Nathan Shepherdson
2006	Winner	Nathan Sheperdson
2006	Runners-up	Sue Clennell, Jeri Kroll and Mell McKimmie
2007	Winner	Therese Van Maanen
2007	Commended	Gary Thornell, Sue Clennell, Nathan Curnow and James Hughes
2008	Winner	David Musgrave
2008	Runner-up	Siall Waterbright
2008	Commended	Simon Sandall, Nathan Shepherdson and Andrew Slattery*
2009	Winner	Christine Paice
2009	2nd Prize	Mark Tredinnick
2009	Runners-up	Oliver Driscoll and Nathan Shepherdson
2010	Winner	Nathan Curnow
2010	2nd Prize	Andrew Slattery*
2010	Commended	Carmen Leigh Keates and Jill Pattinson
2011	Winner	Maria Zajkowski
2011	2nd Prize	Dan Disney
2011	Commended	Kristen Lang and Rhyll McMaster
2012	Winner	Maria Zajkowski
2012	Commended	Carmen Leigh Keates, Nathan Shepherdson and Meredith Wattison
2013	Winner	Nathan Shepherdson
2013	2nd Prize	No prize awarded
2014	Winner	John Watson
2014	2nd Prize	Jonathan Hadwen
2015	Winner	Amanda Johnson
2015	2nd Prize	Tug Dumbly
2016	Joint Winners	Sarah Holland-Batt and Chloe Wilson

- Slattery's awards were revoked after the discovery of widespread plagiarism.
