= Rob Walker (poet) =

Australian poet and writer

Rob Walker, born 26 June 1953, is a contemporary Australian poet and writer. His poetry has been published widely in magazines, journals, anthologies and online since the mid-1990s. His work has been translated into Arabic, Spanish and Dutch, text-published in English in France and India and e-published on most continents.

== Biography ==
Born Robert John Walker on 26 June 1953, Rob Walker has lived in Adelaide or the Adelaide Hills most of his life. He attended Cowandilla Primary and Plympton High Schools and trained as a primary school teacher at Western Teachers College (later University of South Australia.) He has worked as a primary school educator, particularly in the Performing Arts area. In addition to poetry he writes occasional book reviews, articles, essays and short fiction. He currently divides his time between Australia and Himeji, Japan.

== Poetry ==
Walker's work often relates to the natural world, children and occasionally political and social issues. He uses diverse genres and styles, often using the vernacular and humour to express complex issues in simple language. Consequently, there is no consensus amongst poets or critics as to the value or intent of his work. “Rob Walker's poems concern themselves with injustice, beauty, memory, impressions, captivity and misplaced assistance” (Debra Zott, poet)

“Some may find Walker's poetry to be straightforward, but I believe that this is a mirage effect as, while written with apparent simplicity and without engaging in sophisticated word play, there is a constant thread of preoccupation running from the local to the global. Some poems are marbled through with a contained distress or acrid criticism which hides in the form of humorous satire" (Susan Ballyn, University of Barcelona)

“Walker touches on the full spectrum of human frailty.” (Magdalena Ball, poet, editor, broadcaster.)

"Rob Walker combines sharp perception, compassion and humour to create crisp intersections of time and place. Airy shortcuts, sensuous imagery, and a warm sympathy combine in poems that range from insect life to human relationships, from landscape to love." (Jan Owen, Australian poet)

“Walker finds a wide range of subjects variously eliciting his wit, concern, outrage or empathy. He achieves memorable poems through a combination of startling visual imagery and a dialogue with language itself.” (Graham Rowlands, poet, editor, Flinders University)

“Whether he's focussing on the minute worlds of insects or big political themes, rob walker's poetry is witty, incisive and nicely attuned to the 'mouthfeel' of language. His black sense of humour is a bonus." Mike Ladd (poet, ABC broadcaster)

He employs a wide variety of genres – text, audio/ video poems, music and spoken word performance poetry. He has had music composed for his work by – and recorded and performed live with – Zephyr Quartet and Max-Mo. He makes his work available to Creative Commons websites where it has been frequently remixed by other artists.

== Bibliography ==
Sparrow In An Airport (NEW POETS TEN Friendly Street/Wakefield Press, 2005) ISBN 1-86254-670-3

Micromacro (Seaview Press, 2006) ISBN 978-1-74008-415-4

Friendly Street Poets THIRTY (Wakefield Press, 2006) ISBN 978-1-86254-702-5 (co-edited with Louise Nicholas)

Phobiaphobia (Picaro Press, 2007) ISBN 978-1-920957-35-3

Walker has also been published in Australian and international literary journals, magazines and websites and anthologies including Friendly Street Poets Annual Anthologies 2004–2011, Best Australian Poems (ed. Les Murray, Black Inc, 2005), Quadrant, Blue Dog, Blue Giraffe, Blast, 4W, Going Down Swinging, The Adelaide Review, New England Review, Famous Reporter, The Cortland Review, Mascara Literary Journal, Divan, Southern Ocean Review, Cordite Poetry Review, Australian Poetry, Text, LiNQ, The Compulsive Reader, Australian Reader. His audio poems and music have been broadcast on radio and released on CD. Since 2006 his website has been archived by the National Library of Australia.

== Awards ==
• Inaugural Onkaparinga Poetry Unhinged Single Poet Collection Competition, 2006 (winner, for micromacro )

• 2007 Newcastle Poetry Prize (New Media) for moon: antipoem (with his son Matt Walker)

• 2009 Newcastle Poetry Prize (New Media) for bibliophobia (with his son Ben Walker)

• 2010 Newcastle Poetry Prize (New Media) as judge.
