= Wet Ink/CAL Short Story Prize =

- Awarded for: Excellence in short story fiction
- Country: Australia
- Presented by: Wet Ink
- First award: 2010
- Final award: 2012
- Currently held by: Clair Aman
- Website: Official site

The Wet Ink/CAL Short Story Prize, formally known as the Wet Ink Short Story Prize, was an annual literary award given by the magazine Wet Ink for Australian short fiction. Only Australians are eligible for the award. The Wet Ink Short Story Prize was first awarded in 2011 for works written during 2010. The award was discontinued following the closure of Wet Ink with 2012 being the final year the prize was awarded.

== History ==
In March 2010 the Australian magazine Wet Ink announced the creation of the Wet Ink Short Story Prize to mark their five years of publication.

The 2010 prize was open for entries until August 31, 2010. Entries must have met certain criteria including having been written by a writer who is living in Australia, the story must have never been previously published nor be under consideration by a publisher, magazine or for any other prize. The short story doesn't have to follow any set style or theme but must be 5000 words or less. The 2010 prize was judged by Wet Ink's fiction editors Sally Breen and Emmett Stinson, and guest judge Peter Goldsworthy. The winner was announced in January 2011. "The Development Drip" by David Jagger won first prize of $3000, a year's subscription to Wet Ink, as well as the story being published in the March 2011 issue of Wet Ink. Two highly commended entries received a prize of $200, publication in the March 2011 issue, and a year's subscription to the magazine. Mike Ladd's "Ken" and Sam Twyford-Moore's "Everything We Did in a Different Order" were the two highly commended entries of the 2010 prize. All shortlisted entries received $150, publication in the 'Shortlist issue' [June 2011] of Wet Ink, and a year's subscription to the magazine.

In 2011, after receiving funding from the Copyright Agency Ltd Cultural Fund, Wet Ink renamed the prize 'The Wet Ink/CAL Short Story Prize' and increased the value of its prizes to $3000 First Prize, $1000 each for two Highly Commended entries, and $250 for each shortlisted entry. In addition, each of these entrants will be published in Wet Ink and receive a year's subscription to the magazine.

In 2011, the Wet Ink/CAL Short Story Prize will be judged by Wet Ink's fiction editors Sally Breen and David Sornig, and guest judge Brian Castro. The 2011 prize was won by Sarah Klenbort for her work "Sale Victoria" while J Anne de Staic and James Klousia received the two high commendations.

Wet Ink closed in late 2012. Despite this, the Short Story Prize for 2012 was published online at www.wetink.com.au in April 2013, and prizes were awarded and paid. The Wet Ink website was maintained until June 2013 with details of the winners and the shortlist. The winner of the Wet Ink/CAL Short Story Prize was Claire Aman with two runners-up, Rebekah Clarkson and James Halford.

== Winners and nominees ==
In the following table, the years correspond to the year of the story's eligibility; the ceremonies are always held the following year. Each year links to the corresponding "year in literature" article. Entries with a blue background have won the award; those with a white background are the nominees on the short-list.

* Winners and joint winners
* Commendations
* Runners-up
* Nominees on the shortlist

Year	Author(s)	Short story	Ref
2010	David Jagger*	"The Development Drip"	
2010	Mike Ladd	"Ken"	
2010	Sam Twyford-Moore	"Everything We Did in a Different Order"	
2010	Pamela Baker	"Something to Tell You"	
2010	Maggie Betts	"French Kissing"	
2010	Christopher Burns	"Lonely Leather"	
2010	Jacinta Butterworth	"Fence"	
2010	Arthur Chaffey	"East"	
2010	Rebekah Clarkson	"Barking Dogs"	
2010	Lynne Deperas	"Stick"	
2010	Liz Gallois	"My Bald Head"	
2010	Mark Liston	"Les’s Mudflats"	
2010	Kirk Marshall	"Validation"	
2010	Janine Mikosza	"In the First Place"	
2010	Lois Murphy	"Out of their Depths"	
2010	Susan Paterson	"Flowers for a Dry Land"	
2010	Pavle Radonic	"Grattan Street"	
2010	Pavle Radonic	"The Romance Influence"	
2010	Joanne Riccioni	"Lightning and Phosphorescence"	
2010	Ann Shenfield	"For Sylvia"	
2010	Ben Sorgiovanni	"The Fire"	
2010	Amy St Lawrence	"Percy"	
2010	Alexander Symonds	"Civil War"	
2010	Emma Waters	"Caged Rabbits"	
2010	Dave Wilkinson	"Breaking the Surface"	
2010	Sean Wilson	"By the Pond"	
2011	Sarah Klenbort*	"Sale Victoria"	
2011	J Anne de Staic	"Fire Jump"	
2011	James Klousia	"Toy Soldier"	
2011	Cassandra Atherton	"Drufock's Lover"	
2011	Antonia Baldo	"A Real Man"	
2011	Sophia Helen Barnes	"Tsoi"	
2011	Jacinta Butterworth	"Zombies"	
2011	Clinton Caward	"The Stars"	
2011	Elva Darnell	"The Bite"	
2011	Barbara Eather	"3pm Anzac Day"	
2011	Liz Gallois	"What Happens at Home"	
2011	Craig Garrett	"Magpies"	
2011	Susan Holoubek	"Always by You"	
2011	Patricia Jones	"The Rebel and his Ruin"	
2011	Tim Lucas	"Slow Wave"	
2011	Aaron Mannion	"Notice Me Take My Hand"	
2011	Lois Murphy	"Troy"	
2011	Adam Narnst	"Blue People"	
2011	Adam Narnst	"Insult"	
2011	Maureen O'Shaughnessy	"Rubber"	
2011	Joanne Riccioni	"Hero"	
2011	Martin Slattery	"Mexicans"	
2011	Rohan Wightman	"Faggot"	
2011	Rohan Wightman	"A Ride with Death"	
2012	Clair Aman*	"The Day You Thought of Fortunatus"	
2012	Rebekah Clarkson	"The Apex Club"	
2012	James Halford	"The Counterfeit General"	
2012	Gillian Britton	"Beautiful Girl"	
2012	Sophia Barnes	"Brilliance"	
2012	Beth Yahp	"Dogs in Love"	
2012	Jennifer Mills	"The Last Anthropologist"	
