= Collusion (poetry collection) =

2012 poetry collection by Brook Emery

- Author: Brook Emery
- Language: English
- Genre: Poetry collection
- Publisher: John Leonard Press
- Publication date: 2012
- Publication place: Australia
- Media type: Print
- Pages: 58pp.
- ISBN: 978-0-9808-5236-3
- Dewey Decimal: A821.4
- Preceded by: Uncommon Light
- Followed by: Have Been and Are

Collusion (2012) is a collection of poetry by the Australian writer Brook Emery.

== Contents ==
The collection which, according to Emery's epigraph, explores Daniel Defoe’s question "is it better to be here or there?", contains 35 poems, some of which had been previously published. (Note: An unusual feature of the collection is that none of the included poems have a title, and each is simply identified in the Contents by part, or all of their first line; which, as Susan Fealy notes, in her review for Mascara Literary Review (No.13, June 2013), not only applies to those (formerly titled) poems previously published elsewhere, but also to those (formerly titled) poems that had been short-listed in the Blake Poetry Prize in 2009 and 2010.)

- "Dear K, it's light that makes the river flow"
- ". . . naked and alone"
- ". . . balanced on girders"
- "After the lassitudes of blue"
- "It's almost spring in our neglected hemisphere"
- "In the hour or so before night's certain fall"
- "Waking at night silence has the colour"
- "All morning it's been difficult to settle"
- "A low pressure cell is tracking up the coast"
- ". . . on his left wrist"
- "I remember very little"
- "I want to say the word 'adrift' "
- "You know the way"
- "I can eclipse you with a wink"
- "Contested ground, this strange persistent beauty"
- "It appears we are machines to manufacture words"
- "In the background there is the music"
- "They come and go in pockets"
- "Perhaps the first thing I notice"
- "It comes from over there"
- "The half-awake world in the half-light"
- "You've been waiting for something like this"
- ". . . a dog, looking pleased"
- "The black hill looks to float straight out to sea"
- "Is this now the Anthropocene"
- "Gloom off to the west"
- "It's when the plane takes off"
- "In the photograph we're standing in a line"
- "I walk among the dead"
- "Autumn warmth is draining from the day"
- "I almost understand this resonance"
- "Here it is not so much the thought which teases"
- ". . . seagulls"
- ". . . we're not so unalike"
- "Rain as it is only brighter"

=== Awards ===
- 2009 – Blake Poetry Prize, the poem This Curious light (included in this collection as "After the lassitudes of blue") was shortlisted.
- 2010 – Blake Poetry Prize, the poem Adrift (divided in this collection into three parts: "I remember very little", "I want to say the word 'adrift' ", and "You know the way") was shortlisted.

== Critical reception ==
The collection has been reviewed.

== See also ==
- 2012 in poetry
- 2012 in Australian literature
