= Misplaced Heart =

2003 poetry collection by Brook Emery

- Author: Brook Emery
- Genre: Poetry collection
- Publisher: Five Islands Press
- Publication date: 2003
- Publication place: Australia
- Media type: Print
- Pages: 93pp.
- ISBN: 978-1-7412-8018-0
- Dewey Decimal: A821.3
- Preceded by: and dug my fingers in the sand
- Followed by: At a Slight Angle

Misplaced Heart (2003) is a collection of poetry by the Australian writer Brook Emery. (Note: When interviewed in 2013, Emery not only observed that "much of my writing is about the sea", but also that "I've been a surfer all my life and both my books [viz., and dug my fingers in the sand (2000), and Misplaced Heart (2003)] are full of the sea and the surf" ("Writers' Sucesses [sic] Celebrated, Uninews, University of Newcastle Australia, (October 2003), p. 12.); and, in 2016, he stressed that, as a surfer, he was "a body surfer rather than a boardrider" ("Adapted for Land—A Lungfish writes the Sea", Plumwood Mountain Journal, Vol.3, No.1, February 2016).)

== Contents ==
The collection contains 40 poems, some of which had been previously published.

- "The mind is a small bird hovering"
- "Sunday"
- "A raven before the dove"
- "Lightning"
- "Fog"
- "Letter while flying"
- "Uncoupling"
- "The mind is a tightrope walker balanced"
- "Let it go (hold on to)"
- "We do only be drowned now and again" (Note: Source of the poem's title (see Misplaced Heart, p. 30): "The old man gave me his view of the use of fear. 'A man who is not afraid of the sea will soon be drownded', he said, 'for he will be going out on a day he shouldn't. But we do be afraid of the sea, and we do only be drownded now and again.' " (J.M. Synge, The Aran Islands, Part II, p. 96).)
- "Memory"
- "The mind is a body breathing in unconsciously"
- "Bicycle"
- "Painting Jane Avril" (Note: Jane Avril (1868–1943), the Moulin Rouge dancer and frequent subject of Toulouse-Lautrec.)
- "Body of knowledge"
- "Beauty"
- "Is that it is"
- "I see"
- "The mind is a kind of theatre and we"
- "Mayakovsky" (Note: An annotated poem, providing an account of the life, works, and influence of the Russian futurist poet and playwright Vladimir Vladimirovich Mayakovsky (1893–1930). Emery's poem "Mayakovsky" is at pp. 56-61, and its associated glossary is at pp. 62-63.)
- "Self-portrait with exploding device (circa 1967)"
- "It's Sunday morning in Newtown"
- "In Brisbane"
- "Aubade and evensong: new year, 2003"
- "Commentary: two days"
- "The mind is the surface of a pond expanding"
- "Final belief/ "
- "Shopping"
- "Waking at night"
- "Between"
- "For my brother and sister"
- "Night"
- "The mind is a misplaced heart lopsidedly"
- "Like driftwood by a doorstep"
- "For a child"
- "Driving north"
- "And asked her how she was"
- "Wind"
- "The brain has the consistency"
- "Postscript: like Picasso"

=== Awards ===
- 2000 – Third Prize, 2000 Tom Collins Poetry Prize, for his poem "Fog".
- 2002 – Max Harris Literary Award for Poetry at the Penola Festival, for his poem "A Raven Before the Dove".
- 2002 – Bruce Dawe National Poetry Prize, for his poem final belief.
- Short-listed — Kenneth Slessor Prize for Poetry (New South Wales Premier's Literary Awards) 2004.

== Critical reception ==
The collection has been reviewed.

== See also ==
- 2003 in Australian literature
- 2003 in Poetry
