= At a Slight Angle: and Other Poems =

2008 poetry collection by Brook Emery

- Author: Brook Emery
- Series: Wagtail
- Release number: 56
- Genre: Poetry collection
- Publisher: Picaro Press
- Publication date: 2008
- Publication place: Australia
- Media type: Print
- Pages: 16pp.
- Dewey Decimal: N 821.408005
- Preceded by: Misplaced Heart
- Followed by: Uncommon Light

At a Slight Angle: and Other Poems (2008) is a collection of poetry by the Australian writer Brook Emery, published as number 56 in the Wagtail series of sixteen page chapbooks. (Note: Over a thirteen year period (2001 to 2013) Picaro Press, founded by Judy Johnson and Rob Riel, published 131 selections in its Wagtail Series. "The Wagtail series comprises monthly issues of a selection of a poets' work. Each pamphlet is exactly sixteen pages, attractively designed and uses print-on-demand technology. ... The sixteen-page Wagtail series can be looked at in two different ways. At the atomistic level, each little pamphlet is an introduction, successful or not, to an individual poet's work. At the holistic level, the series makes up a kind of giant, evolving anthology of contemporary Australian poetry where everybody gets sixteen pages in the spotlight." — Martin Duwell (2008).)

== Contents ==
The collection contains 18 poems.

- "Seascape"
- "Cowboys"
- "A Twist of Hemp"
- "Physical"
- "Sunday"
- "For a Child"
- "Waking at Night"
- "The Distance and the Heat"
- "Shellac"
- "Skink"
- "Crossing the Border"
- "In Brisbane"
- "Underfoot"
- "Kato (HD-1220)"
- "Near Brooklyn"
- "Bicycle"
- "It's Sunday Morning in Newtown"
- "At a Slight Angle"

=== Awards ===
- 1998 – The Denis Butler Memorial Award, for the poem The Distance and the Heat.
- 1999 – The Australian Sports Poetry Award, for the poem Physical.

== See also ==
- 2008 in poetry
- 2008 in Australian literature
