= Sea Scale: New & Selected Poems =

2022 poetry collection by Brook Emery

- Author: Brook Emery
- Genre: Poetry collection
- Publisher: Puncher and Wattmann
- Publication date: 2022
- Publication place: Australia
- Media type: Print
- Pages: 291pp.
- ISBN: 978-1-9225-7109-0
- Dewey Decimal: A821.4
- Preceded by: Have Been and Are

Sea Scale: New & Selected Poems (2022) is a collection of new and selected poetry by Australian writer Brook Emery.

== Contents ==
The collection contains 31 new poems, and a selection of poems taken from five previous collections.

=== Sea Scale: New Poems ===
- "Self Portrait: Provisional Sketch"
- "Devote Less Time"
- "Rendezous"
- "Pickpocket"
- "The Heart of the Matter"
- "Meditating"
- "as if / the moth"
- "As Light Seeps In"
- "Implicated Witness"
- "The Stars at Night"
- "In the Art Gallery"
- "Tree Roots, Bellingen"
- "Undiminished"
- "Contra Lorca"
- "A Shaft of Sunlight"
- "Joe Palooka"
- "Voltage Across a Membrane" (Note: For more details of this poem's creation, see: Emery, Brook (2020), "Voltage Across a Membrane", Axon: Creative Explorations, Vol.10, No.2, December 2020.)
- "The Eremite in his Cave"
- "Between Time"
- "The Traveller Reminisces"
- "My Bald Head"
- "Letter to Tristram Shandly, Gentleman"
- "Big-Time Wrestling"
- "Culture"
- "The Dandelion's Puffball"
- "On or About December 1910"
- "Velcro"
- "Half the Sins"
- "Posthumous Existence"
- "The Kid on the Billycart"
- "Self Portrait: Sea Scale"

=== From and dug my fingers in the sand (2000) (Note: "To get past big waves, swim underneath them ... In open water races competitive swimmers will hold the sea floor, digging their fingers into the sand and using this handhold to propel themselves forward underwater, letting the wave pass overhead. Holding on to the sea floor stabilises your position ... " (Kate Rew, "How to Swim under and through Waves", p.20 in Rew, Kate (2022), The Outdoor Swimmer's Handbook: Collected Wisdom on the Art, Sport and Science of Outdoor Swimming, Random House UK. ISBN 978-1-8460-4728-2)) ===
- "and dug my fingers in the sand"
- "Physical"
- "Song of Songs"
- "Cowboys"
- "My Father's Eyes"
- "Shellac"
- "With My Father-in-Law"
- "Crossing the Border"
- "Infidelity"
- "Improvising with Flaubert"
- "Underfoot"
- "Letter to a Live Poet"
- "any and all means""
- "The Distance and the Heat"
- "At a Slight Angle"
- "Approaching the Edge"

=== From Misplaced Heart (2003) ===
- "The mind is a small bird hovering"
- "Sunday"
- "A Raven Before the Dove"
- "Letter While Flying"
- "The mind is a tightrope walker balanced"
- "Let it go (hold on to)"
- "We do only be drowned now and again"
- "The mind is a body breathing in unconsciously"
- "The mind is a kind of theatre and we""
- "Aubade and Evensong: New Year 2003"
- "Prequel: Sequel"
- "Commentary: Two Days"
- "The mind is the surface of a pond expanding"
- "For a Child"
- "For My Brother and Sister"
- "And asked her how she was"
- "Final Belief"
- "The mind is a misplaced heart lopsidedly"
- "Postscript: Like Picasso"

=== From Uncommon Light (2007) ===
- "Spring"
- "Very Like a Whale"
- "Morning: Thinking of You"
- "Finches Perhaps"
- "Monster"
- "Sunday: (Everything can be) transformed"
- "That Beat Against the Cage"
- "'Am I really the person who bears my name?'"
- "Monster"
- "Against Immortality"
- "Tourism: what the I sees"
- "Uncommon Light"
- "Thirty-six Views of Bondi Beach"
- "Monster"
- "Narcissus: self portrait with sea"
- "Half-glimpsed through water"
- "This Disenchanted World"
- "Monster"
- "Spring is Still Spring (Summer)"

=== From Collusion (2012) ===
- "Dear K, it's light that makes the river flow"
- "After the lassitudes of blue"
- "It's almost spring in our neglected hemisphere"
- "In the hour or so before night's certain fall"
- "Waking at night silence has the colour"
- "All morning it's been difficult to settle"
- "A low pressure cell is tracking up the coast"
- "I remember very little"
- "I want to say the word 'adrift' "
- "You know the way a snatch of song"
- "I can eclipse you with a wink"
- "Contested ground, this strange persistent beauty"
- "It appears we are machines to manufacture words
- "In the background there is the music"
- "Gloom off to the west"
- "I walk among the dead"
- "Autumn warmth is draining from the day"
- "I almost understand this resonance"
- "Rain as it is only brighter"

=== From Have Been and Are (2016) (Note: The collection's title was taken from the very last sentence in Darwin's Origin of Species (1859): "Thus, from the war of nature, from famine and death, the most exalted object which we are capable of conceiving, namely, the production of the higher animals, directly follows. There is grandeur in this view of life, with its several powers, having been originally breathed into a few forms or into one; and that, whilst this planet has gone cycling on according to the fixed law of gravity, from so simple a beginning endless forms most beautiful and most wonderful have been, and are being, evolved.") ===
- "And the word 'environment' "
- "Brain doesn't improvise"
- "We are lashed to our body"
- "The poet is a centipede"
- "Body is but a striving"
- "At the end of the mind"
- "To get the better of words"
- "The rain falls down"
- "The most important experience of being"
- "Everything waste"
- "Only keep still, wait, and hear"
- "Echo, repetition, statement"
- "The brown current"
- "A preposterous hodgepodge"
- "What were they then"
- "The lightness, the non-mass of it"
- "There on the shore"
- "A steady delete"
- "Drive, he sd" (Note: "drive, he sd, for/christ’s sake, look/out where yr going.": Creeley, Robert (1962), "I Know a Man", p.38, For Love: Poems 1950–1960, New York: Charles Scribner's Sons. ISBN 0-684-71738-7 — also, see: "I Know a Man", at Poetry Foundation.)
- "I should be rolling down the skyway"
- "Stately, plump Buck Mulligan"
- "You want ghosts"
- "A spring day like this"
- "Endless forms most beautiful and wonderful"
- "Broken / Beautiful"

== Critical reception ==
The collection has been reviewed.

== See also ==
- 2022 in Australian literature
- 2022 in Poetry
