= Brook Emery =

Australian poet, educator, and surf lifesaver

- Born: Nigel Westbrook Emery; 24 July 1949 (age 77); St. Margaret's Maternity Hospital, Darlinghurst, NSW
- Education: B.A. University of Sydney; Dip.Ed. University of Sydney; M.A. University of Sydney; Ph.D. University of Newcastle
- Spouse: Susan Jean Dixon (m.1972)
- Children: 3
- Writing career
- Genre: Poetry
- Notable works: and dug my fingers in the sand Misplaced Heart; At a Slight Angle; Uncommon Light; Collusion; Have Been and Are; Sea Scale

Brook Emery (born 24 July 1949) is an Australian poet, educator, and surf lifesaver. Described by Martin Duwell as "a major poet", and recipient of the 2011 $25,000 for Poetry Australian Council Literature Board Grant for Developing Writers, Emery has been the New South Wales editor of Blue Dog, the Journal of the Australian Poetry Centre. Along with Peter Minter, David Brooks, and Martin Harrison he was one of the founders of the Sydney Poetry Network. He has chaired the Australian Poetry Festival and the Poets Union, and is a mentor at the Australian Society of Authors.

== Family ==
The son of Englishman Derek John Edward Emery (1914-1975) (Note: "My dad died when I was twenty-five/(I wasn't there; my mum had died before)./The heart attack that killed him/left him little time to age, or me to fret./Life just stopped on that sudden note." — "With My Father-in-Law", and dug my fingers in the sand (2000), p.41.) and his Australian wife, Cecil Audrey "Pat" Westbrook (1921-1965), Nigel Westbrook Emery, known as "Brook", (Note: "I try to name myself,/the given name I never use, mother's forgotten maiden name,/the surname I inherited and have already handed on." — "Improvising with Flaubert", and dug my fingers in the sand (2000), p.31.) was born at St. Margaret's Maternity Hospital, Darlinghurst, Sydney, New South Wales on 24 July 1949. His father, Derek Emery, was a prominent member of the Dajonian Repertory Society from 1936 to 1940.

Brook had two siblings: a younger brother, Curtis Leigh Emery, known as "Leigh", and a younger sister, Stephanie Gail Emery, later Stephanie Gail Rumball. He married Susan Jean Dixon, also a teacher, at Grafton, New South Wales in 1972; they had three children: a daughter, and twins (daughter and son). (Note: "When my son popped up from beneath tight-fisted foam/his first words were, "I'm alive, I'm alive." His twin sister/whom I'd pushed into the face of an earlier wave before I turned/and failed to grab my son — I couldn't hold him — was paddling now/with a group of surfers three times her size and trying not to cry." — "It's when the plane takes off", Collusion (2012), p.47.)

== Education ==
=== Secondary ===
Emery was a talented student; and, having won a New South Wales Government Bursary to commence his secondary studies in 1962 at Vaucluse High School, he not only went on to pass in all five of his H.S.C. subjects in 1967 (the first year of the Higher School Certificate in New South Wales), but was also listed in the "Order of Merit" for his "meritorious performance in [his] attainment of passes at first level in the Higher School Certificate examination" in both English and Modern History.

=== Tertiary: undergraduate ===
Emery attended the University of Sydney from 1968 to 1971, graduating with a Bachelor of Arts (B.A.) and a Diploma of Education (Dip.Ed.) in 1972.

=== Tertiary: postgraduate ===
He returned to study in the 1980s, graduating with a Master of Arts (M.A.) from the University of Sydney in 1983; and then, later, he went on to study with the School of Language and Media at the University of Newcastle, graduating Doctor of Philosophy (Ph.D.) on 19 April 2004.

== Surf lifesaver ==
=== Swimming ===
At 13, and competing in the 14 Years category, he swam for Vaucluse High School in the Combined Eastern Suburbs High Schools Swimming Carnival. Swimming in three different events on the same day, he came third in the 55 yards Butterfly, second in the 55 yards Breaststroke, and second in the longest distance contested in that age division, the 220 yards Freestyle. Both Emery brothers were accomplished surf swimmers.

=== Belt rescue ===
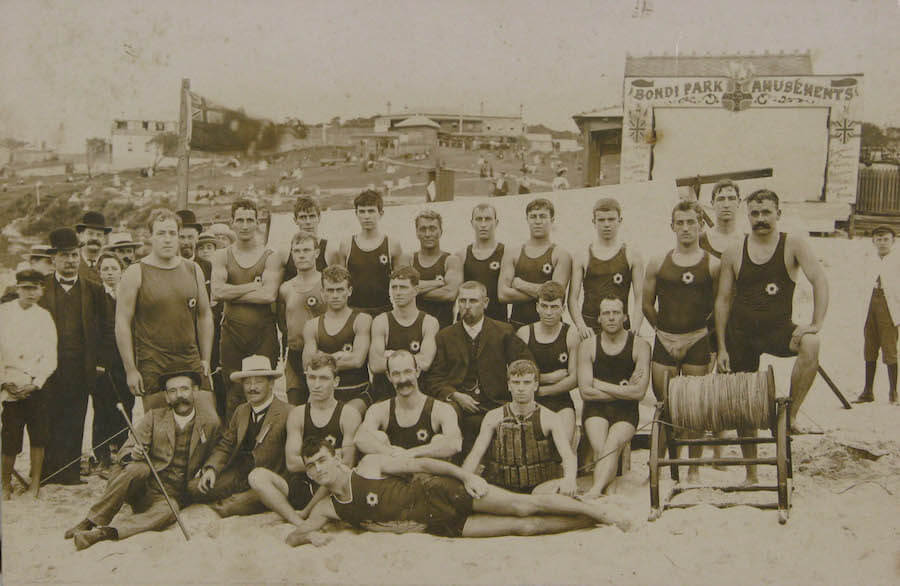
The first-ever public demonstration of the reel, line, and harness — given by members of the Bondi Surf Bathers' Life Saving Club, at Bondi Beach, on 24 March 1907. The reel's inventor, and Bondi's first Club Captain, Lyster Ormsby, is the lifesaver at the left of the back row.

Gaining his Bronze Medallion from Surf Life Saving Australia in 1965, he was one of 20 members of the Bondi Surf Bathers' Life Saving Club to be awarded a Patrol Efficiency Pennant for his efforts during the 1964/1965 season. He was a regular member of the Club's beach patrol teams over eight seasons (1964/1965 to 1971/1972). On 22 February 1969, a day when many of Sydney's beaches were closed because of "dangerous rips and high seas", Brook made a real-life belt rescue of a man who had been "carried 100 yards to sea by a strong rip" at Bondi Beach.

=== Rescue & Resuscitation (R & R) ===
Rescue & Resuscitation (R & R) was a challenging competition involving a team of six, within which a rescue was simulated, with the designated "patient" (maybe 100 metres out to sea) and a "belt-man" — wearing a harness connected to a life saving reel operated by another member of the team — and the remaining three lifesavers in charge of the playing out the (cotton coated in beeswax) line as the rescuer ran from the beach, swam out to the "patient" and, with the assistance of their team-mates' line-pulling assistance, returning the "patient" to the shore (i.e., the "Rescue"). Then, with the "patient" lying on the beach, "Resuscitation" was simulated.

Over eight seasons Brook Emery was a regular member of the Bondi Club's R & R competition team: the Junior R & R team in 1964/1965, 1965/1966, and 1966/1967; and the Senior R & R team in 1967/1968, 1968/1969, 1969/1970, 1970/1971, and 1971/1972, when the Senior team, with both Brook and Leigh as members, came first in the 1972 NSW State Championship, first in the 1972 Australian National Championships, and won the 1972 Australian Surf Life Saving Premiership (BSB.8, pp.3,7,8).

=== Club Captain ===
In the 1970/1971 season Brook Emery was the Vice-Captain of the Bondi Surf Bathers' Life Saving Club (BSB.7, p.14); and, at the age of 22, he was the captain of the Club for the 1971/1972 season. He left the Club after the 1971/1972 season due to his posting to Grafton, in the far north-east of New South Wales, as a teacher.

== Educator ==
- External Media

Images
- A Rescue and Resuscitation competition team of six, from Palm Beach Surf Life Saving Club, Queensland, with their life saving reel (1946), Wikimedia.
- A Rescue and Resuscitation competition team of six, from Palm Beach Surf Life Saving Club, Queensland, waiting for the starting gun (1946), Wikimedia.
- Four of the six-man Rescue and Resuscitation competition team, from Palm Beach Surf Life Saving Club, Queensland, bringing their "patient" to the beach. The sixth man is on the beach still operating the life saving reel that is connected to the belt-man (c.1950), Wikimedia.

Audio
- "Physical", poem read by Brook Emery, The Poetry Archive.
- "The Mind is a Body Breathing In Unconsciously", poem read by Brook Emery, The Poetry Archive.
- "Very like a whale", poem read by Brook Emery, The Poetry Archive.
- "Sunday: '(Everything can be) transformed", poem read by Brook Emery, The Poetry Archive.

Video
- Art After Hours: "Brook Emery, acclaimed Australian poet", Talk by Brook Emery in association with The poetry of drawing: Pre-Raphaelite designs, studies and watercolours, Art Gallery of New South Wales, 13 July 2011.
- "A Life in Poetry: Brook Emery and Ron Pretty in conversation", presented by Poetry Sydney, at the Brett Whitley Studio of the Art Gallery of New South Wales, on 4 November 2018.

Following his graduation at Sydney University he served for 25 years as a specialist English and History teacher at several NSW high schools: viz., Grafton High School, Sydney Boys High School, Maroubra Bay High School, and Dover Heights High School.

== Poet ==
When interviewed in 2013, Emery not only observed that "much of my writing is about the sea", but also that "I've been a surfer all my life and both my books [viz., and dug my fingers in the sand (2000), and Misplaced Heart (2003)] are full of the sea and the surf"; and, in 2016, he stressed that, as a surfer, he was "a body surfer rather than a boardrider".

=== Poems ===
His first-ever published poem, "Tapping the Market", appeared in Education, the Journal of the New South Wales Teachers Federation in 1993. His poem, "Crossing the Border", which appeared in Southerly in 1994, was the first of his poems to be published in a literary journal. His poem, "Pinball Rider", which appeared in Spectrum, the Saturday Supplement to The Sydney Morning Herald, in 1997, was the first of his poems to be published in a newspaper. His poem, "Death at Birth", which appeared (p.26) in Helen Annand's (1998) The Second Worst Thing: Poems on Surviving the Death of a Child, was the first of his poems to be published in an anthology.

==== Publications ====
In addition to Education, Southerly, Spectrum, and The Second Worst Thing, his poems have been published in a wide range of publications.

==== Anthologies ====
His poems have also been included in a number of anthologies, such as: The Second Worst Thing (1998); The Argument from Desire (1999); New Music (2001); Ten Years Live (2001); The Opening of Borders (2001); Time's Collision with the Tongue (2001); Open Boat, Barbed Wire Sky (2003); Reunion (2003); Suburbs of the Mind (2004); The Honey Fills the Cone (2006); The Road South (2007); The Best Australian Poetry 2008 (2008); 60 Classic Australian Poems (2009); Guide to Sydney Beaches (2009); The Puncher & Wattmann Anthology of Australian Poetry (2009); The Best Australian Poems 2010 (2010); The Best Australian Poems 2011 (2011); The Best Australian Poems 2014 (2014); Falling and Flying: Poems on Ageing (2015); Prayers of a Secular World (2015); The Best Australian Poems 2015 (2015); and Writing to the Wire (2016), etc.

=== Collected works ===
Six collections of his work have been published: and dug my fingers in the sand, in 2000; (Note: "To get past big waves, swim underneath them ... In open water races competitive swimmers will hold the sea floor, digging their fingers into the sand and using this handhold to propel themselves forward underwater, letting the wave pass overhead. Holding on to the sea floor stabilises your position ... " (Kate Rew, "How to Swim under and through Waves", p.20 in Rew, Kate (2022), The Outdoor Swimmer's Handbook: Collected Wisdom on the Art, Sport and Science of Outdoor Swimming, Random House UK. ISBN 978-1-8460-4728-2)) Misplaced Heart, in 2003; At a Slight Angle, in 2006; Uncommon Light, in 2007; Collusion, in 2012; Have Been and Are, in 2016; (Note: The collection's title was taken from the very last sentence in Darwin's Origin of Species (1859): "Thus, from the war of nature, from famine and death, the most exalted object which we are capable of conceiving, namely, the production of the higher animals, directly follows. There is grandeur in this view of life, with its several powers, having been originally breathed into a few forms or into one; and that, whilst this planet has gone cycling on according to the fixed law of gravity, from so simple a beginning endless forms most beautiful and most wonderful have been, and are being, evolved.") and Sea Scale, in 2022.

=== Judge ===
In 2013, along with the Australian poet and 2004 C.J. Dennis Prize for Poetry and Judith Wright Calanthe Award winner Judith Beveridge, the psychiatrist and poet Jennifer Harrison, and the British poet and 2009 T. S. Eliot Prize winner Philip Gross, as head judge, Emery was appointed to the four-member judging panel for the prestigious (2014) inaugural $15,000 University of Canberra Vice-Chancellor's Poetry Prize. He was appointed judge of the Shoalhaven Literary Award for Poetry 2016.

== Works ==
=== Dissertations ===
- 1983: Emery, Nigel Westbrook, The Road Novels of Jack Kerouac, M.A. Dissertation, University of Sydney. (A physical copy of the dissertation is held in the Rare Books & Special Collections division of University of Sydney's Fisher Library.)
- 2003: Emery, Brook, King Lear's Clothes: Addressing the Line in Twentieth Century Poetry, Ph.D. Dissertation, School of Language and Media, University of Newcastle. (A physical copy of the dissertation is held in the Collections division of University of Newcastle's Auchmuty Library.)

=== Articles ===
- 1993: Verse: "Tapping the Market", Education: Journal of the New South Wales Public School Teachers Federation, Vol.74, No.11, (23 August 1993), p. 19.
- 1994: "The Fed Rep's Lament" (a poem), Education: Journal of the New South Wales Public School Teachers Federation, Vol.75, No.1, (7 February 1994), p. 8.
- 1994: "Excellent Comprehensives", Education: Journal of the New South Wales Public School Teachers Federation, Vol.75, No.1, (7 February 1994), pp. 15-16.
- 2016: "Made it his mission to make Australian poetry visible": Ron Pretty October 16, 1940-June 30, 2023 (Obituary), The Sydney Morning Herald, 9 August 2023.

=== Essays ===
- 2003: "Reviewing", pp. 106-113 in Ron Pretty (ed.), Practical Poetics, Wollongong, NSW: Five Islands Press, 2003. ISBN 978-0-8641-8741-3
- 2005: "As Natural as Football", Five Bells, Vol.12, No.1, (December 2005), pp. 24-27.
- 2009: "Fiction and Prose: Thin Partitions do their Bounds Divide", Five Bells, Vol.16, No.4, (September 2009), pp. 36-40.
- 2010: "An Argument about Measure: Marking and Making the Line", Five Bells, Vol.17, Nos.1-2, (December 2010), pp. 127-137.
- 2014: "Not So Much a Thought: Poetry and Philosophy", Axon: Creative Explorations, Vol.4, No.1, July 2014.
- 2016: "Adapted for Land—A Lungfish writes the Sea", Plumwood Mountain Journal, Vol.3, No.1, February 2016.
- 2020: "Voltage Across a Membrane", Axon: Creative Explorations, Vol.10, No.2, December 2020.

=== Interviews ===
- 2014: "Brook Emery speaks to Ron Pretty" (September 2014), Five Islands Press.

=== Collections ===
- 2000: and dug my fingers in the sand, Wollongong: Five Islands Press. ISBN 0864186428
- 2003: Misplaced Heart, Wollongong: Five Islands Press. ISBN 978-1-7412-8018-0
- 2006: At a Slight Angle: and Other Poems (Wagtail 56), Warners Bay, NSW: Picaro Press.
- 2007: Uncommon Light, Carlton: Five Islands Press. ISBN 978-0-7340-3762-6
- 2007: Uncommon Light (a compact disc sound recording of 16 of the collection's 32 poems), River Road Poetry Series, No.2, Spit Junction, NSW: River Road Press. ISBN 978-0-9804-1481-3
- 2012: Collusion, St Kilda: John Leonard Press. ISBN 978-0-9808-5236-3
- 2016: Have Been and Are, Melbourne: Gloria SMH Press. ISBN 978-0-9945-2753-0
- 2022: Sea Scale: New & Selected Poems, Waratah, NSW: Puncher and Wattmann. ISBN 978-1-9225-7109-0

=== Editor ===
- 2010: Emery, Brook (ed.) (with Victoria Haritos), Science Made Marvelous Series: Earthly Matters: Biology and Geology Poems, Potts Point NSW: The Poets Union Inc. ISBN 978-0-9805-4202-8
- 2010: Emery, Brook (ed.) (with Victoria Haritos), Science Made Marvelous Series: Law and Impulse: Maths and Chemistry Poems, Potts Point NSW: The Poets Union Inc. ISBN 978-0-9805-4201-1
- 2010: Emery, Brook (ed.) (with John L. Sheppard and Victoria Haritos), Science Made Marvelous Series: Holding Patterns: Physics and Engineering Poems, Potts Point NSW: The Poets Union Inc. ISBN 978-0-9578-5645-5
- 2015: Emery, Brook (ed.) (with Sarah Holland-Batt), Australian Poetry Anthology, Volume 4, Melbourne, Vic: Australian Poetry Ltd. ISSN 2204-3616
- 2018: Emery, Brook (ed.), Naming the Particulars, Parramatta, NSW: Youngstreet Poets. ISBN 978-1-6446-7538-0

== Awards and nominations ==
=== Awards ===
- 1998 – The Denis Butler Memorial Award, for his poem The Distance and the Heat.
- 1999 – The Australian Sports Poetry Award, for his poem Physical.
- 1999 – $15,000 Newcastle Poetry Prize, for his poem Approaching the Edge.
- 2000 – Second Prize, Fellowship of Australian Writers' Anne Elder Poetry Award (for a first book of poetry) for his collection and dug my fingers in the sand.
- 2000 – Third Prize, 2000 Tom Collins Poetry Prize, for his poem "Fog".
- 2001 – $15,000 Judith Wright Calanthe Award for Poetry, Queensland Premier's Literary Awards for his collection and dug my fingers in the sand.
- 2002 – Second Prize, Mary Gilmore Award for a First Book of Poetry for his collection and dug my fingers in the sand.
- 2002 – Max Harris Literary Award for Poetry at the Penola Festival, for his poem "A Raven Before the Dove".
- 2002 – Bruce Dawe National Poetry Prize, for his poem final belief.
- 2011 – $25,000 for Poetry: Australian Council Literature Board Grant for Developing Writers.

== See also ==
- and dug my fingers in the sand
- At a Slight Angle: and Other Poems
- Collusion (poetry collection)
- Have Been and Are
- Kenneth Slessor Prize for Poetry – Poetry award in New South Wales, Australia
- Misplaced Heart
- Poets Union (NSW) and Poets' Union Inc.
- Sea Scale: New & Selected Poems
- Uncommon Light
