= Swimming hole =

Fresh water bodies used for swimming

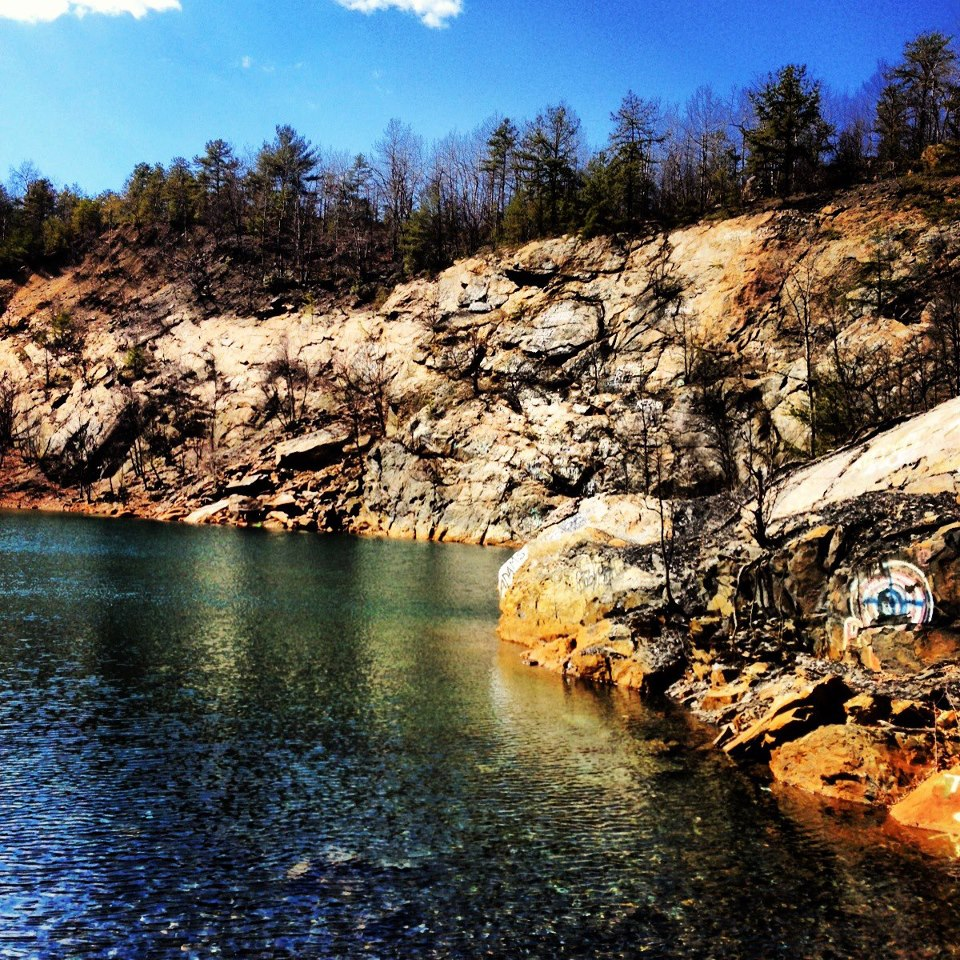
A swimming hole near Shamokin, Pennsylvania

A swimming hole is a place in a river, stream, creek, spring, or similar natural body of water, which is large enough and deep enough for a person to swim in. Common usage usually refers to fresh, moving water and thus not to oceans or lakes.

In the UK swimming at natural swimming holes has a long history and has recently become known as "wild swimming", especially since the publication of bestselling books on the subject by Kate Rew and Daniel Start. In southern Australia, a compendium of swimming holes was first characterised by Brad Neal in his 2004 publication of the first edition of the Guide to Freshwater Swimming Holes in Victoria, Australia.

Nude swimming is well-established at some more remote swimming holes and is an attraction for some natural swimming fans, but in many parts of the world remains an illegal activity.

== History ==
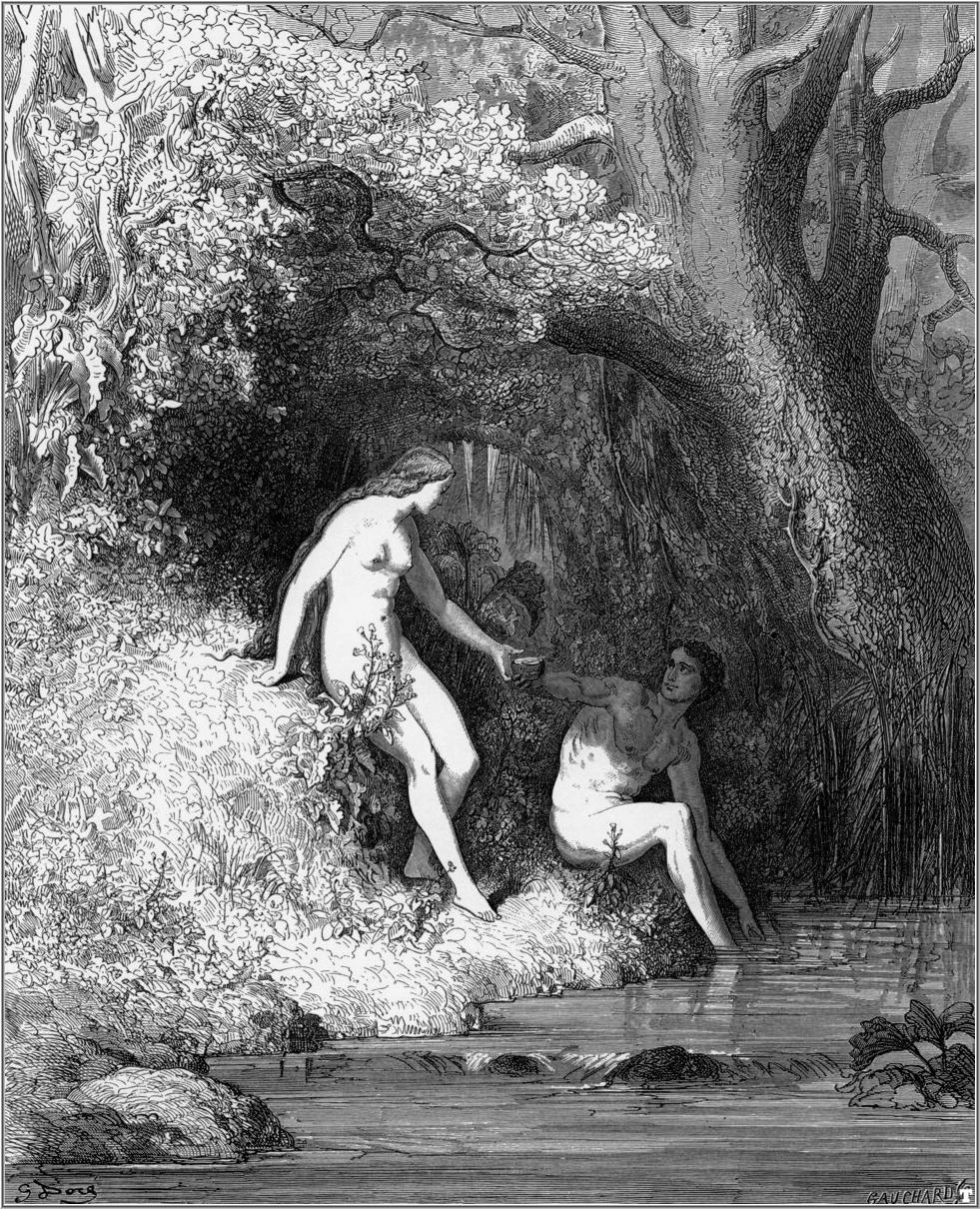
A man and woman at a swimming hole, in this case a creek.

A number of 19th century European artists make positive mention of swimming holes. Counter to earlier depictions of nature as something to be feared, sites such as swimming holes, forests and mountains, were by this period more often regarded as beautiful. For example, William Wordsworth, Samuel Taylor Coleridge and Thomas de Quincey all spent much time bathing in the mountain pools of the Lake District.

In southern Australia, swimming in natural swimming holes was popular until around the time of the 1956 Olympics in Melbourne. In the first half of the 20th century there were several swimming clubs along the Yarra River in Melbourne, such as at Deep Rock. Numerous chlorinated, municipal swimming pools were built across Victoria in the lead up to the 1956 Olympics, which changed the community's swimming preferences to the artificial pools, rather than the local river. The swimming clubs along the Yarra River closed in response to this change in preferences. Some of these pre-Olympic swimming pools still exist, such as at Hepburn Pool in central Victoria, and Seven Creeks in Euroa.

== Safety ==
Safety is a concern with swimming in natural settings. Typically there are no lifeguards and often no safety equipment permanently placed nearby. Currents can be swift and, in larger rivers, are often hidden beneath the surface. Diving or jumping is especially dangerous as the depth varies from season to season, and there may be hidden rocks below the surface resulting in injury or death. The consumption of alcoholic beverages while swimming is especially dangerous, and contributes to at least 20% of deaths by drowning.
