= Ron Pretty =

Australian poet (1940–2023)

Ron Pretty AM
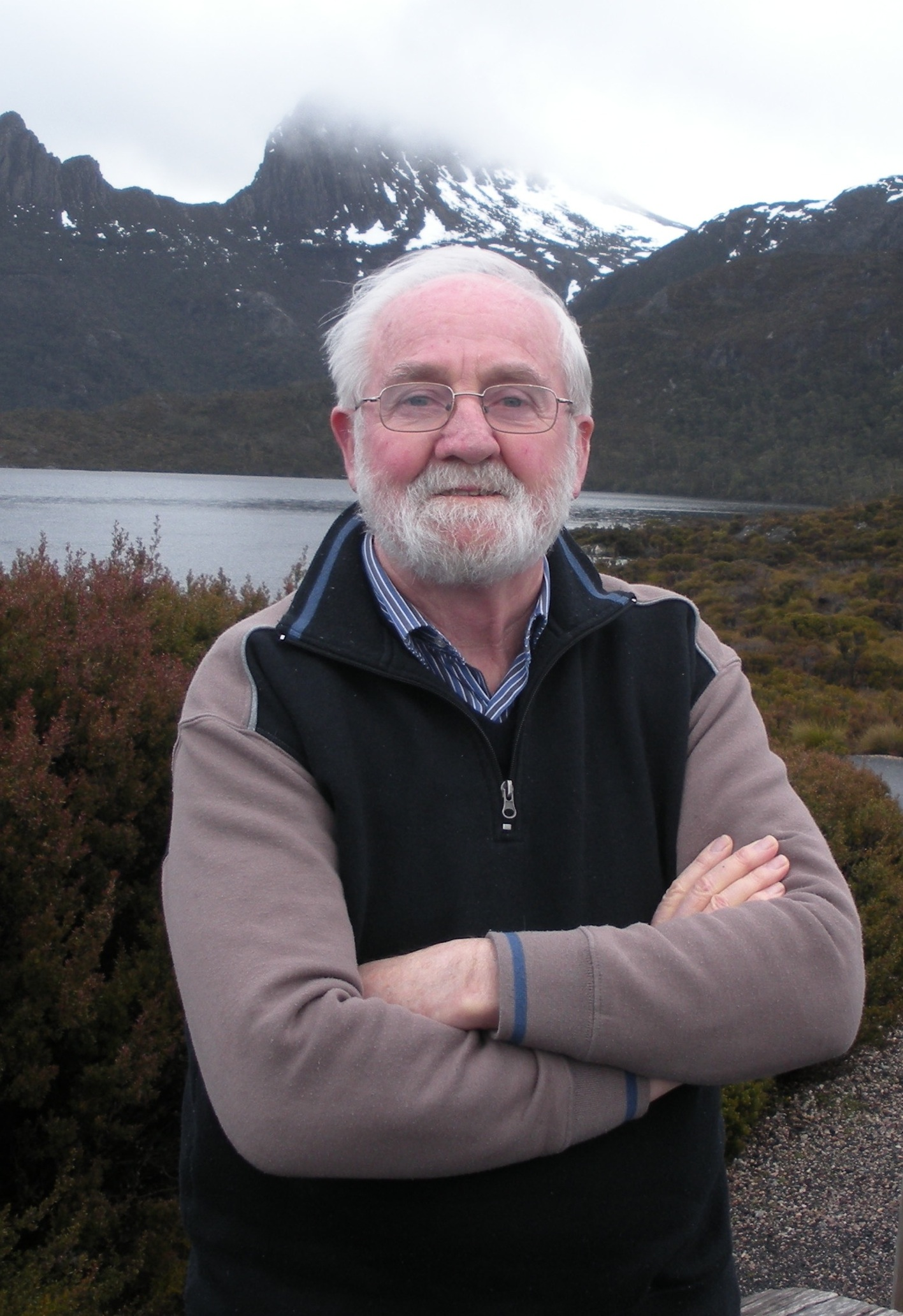
- Born: 16 October 1940; Sydney, New South Wales, Australia
- Died: 30 June 2023 (aged 82)
- Occupations: Lecturer, poet, teacher
- Known for: Poetry

Ronald Keith Pretty AM (16 October 1940 – 30 June 2023) was an Australian poet, editor, publisher and teacher.

== Early life ==
Ronald Keith Pretty was born on the 16 October 1940 in Sydney, New South Wales.

== Career ==
Pretty taught writing at the University of Wollongong and Melbourne University as well as in schools, colleges and a broad variety of community organisations. For a twenty-year period he ran Five Islands Press, publishing some 230 books of poetry and mentored many Australian poets. He edited the magazines Scarp: New Arts and Writing and Blue Dog: Australian Poetry for a number of years.

From 1983 to 1999, Pretty was the Head of Writing in the Faculty of Creative Arts at the University of Wollongong. He was based at the University of Melbourne from 2003 to 2007 where he taught creative writing and was managing editor of Blue Dog: Australian Poetry from 2002 to 2007.

Pretty was instrumental in establishing the Poetry Australia Foundation, which led to the Australian Poetry Centre, one of two organisations which merged in 2011 to form Australian Poetry.

Pretty died on 30 June 2023, at the age of 82.

== Recognition ==
Pretty was awarded the NSW Premier's Award for Poetry and was made a Member of the Order of Australia for services to Australian literature in 2002.

In 2012, he spent six months at the Whiting Studio in Rome, having been awarded a residency by the Australia Council for the Arts. He has had residencies at the Tasmanian Writers Centre, the Katherine Susannah Prichard Centre in WA, and at Hill End Artists' Studio in NSW. In 2014, Five Islands Press established the Ron Pretty Poetry Prize in honour of Ron's energy and creative vigour devoted to poetry for more than 40 years. He was admitted as a Fellow of the University of Wollongong in 2015.

== Selected works ==
=== Poetry ===
==== Collections ====
- The habit of balance. Five Islands Press. 1988.
- Bald Hill with Gliders. Five Islands Press 1991
- Halfway to Eden. Hale & Ironmonger 1996
- Of the Stone: New and Selected Poems. Five Islands Press 2000
- Where the Heart Is. Picaro Press 2009
- Postcards from the Centre. Profile Poetry 2010
- Grace Notes and other poems. Picaro Press 2012
- What the Afternoon Knows. Pitt Street Poetry 2013
- The Left Hand Mirror. Pitt Street Poetry 2017
- 101 Poems. Pitt Street Poetry 2022

==== Poems ====
- "What the house knows" (2014)

=== Non-fiction ===
- Creating Poetry. Five Islands Press 1987, 2001
- Nicole: another chance at life. (with Kaye Bowden). Five Islands Press 1993
- Practical Poetics. Five Islands Press 2003

=== As editor ===
- Outlook: an anthology of poems for senior students. Longman Cheshire 1992
- Anthology of the Illawarra. Five Islands Press 1994
- Cry Out! An anthology of street poetry (with Ann Davis). Five Islands Press 1996
- The Argument from Desire: the 1999 Newcastle Prize Anthology. Five Islands Press 1999
- Blue Like Tea: an anthology of poems from the Wollongong workshop. Five Islands Press 2000
- Wild About the Roof. Wollongong Poetry Workshop 2001
- Poems for all Occasions. Five Islands Press 2002
- Two Spaces of Poetry: poems from Australia & West Bengal 2006
- The Road South: an anthology of contemporary Australian poetry. Kolkata: Bengal Creations 2007

== Reviews ==
Reviews for Ron Pretty's 2013 book, What the Afternoon Knows include:

- John Upton in Cordite Poetry Review: "He's on top of his craft, shrewdly observant, witty, practical rather than flashy, never tired."
- Les Wicks in the Rochford Street Review: "...there is a deep humanity in his observations and as you would expect, the deft hand of a master craftsman."
- Geoff Page in the Canberra Times: "...it's refreshing to read a collection where the poems are direct and emotionally engaged, while still possessing the linguistic and intellectual subtlety we rightly demand of poetry."
