= Louise Oxley =

Australian poet

Louise Oxley (born Elizabeth Louise Hawker, Hobart, 1955) is an Australian poet who "often uses nature as a vehicle to enter metaphors that examine a more emotional, inner view of the world".

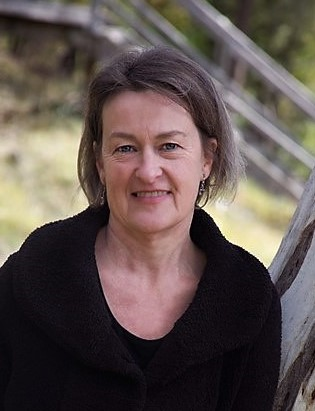
Louise Oxley

Oxley has spent most of her life in Tasmania, but has also lived in France, the UK and Thailand. She holds an MA (Applied Linguistics) from Macquarie University, Sydney. In 2011 she was writer-in-residence at the University of Prince Edward Island, Canada. She served on the board of the Tasmanian Writers Centre (now TasWriters) in 2003–2006 and on advisory panels for ArtsTasmania 2001–2002. From 2007 to 2010 Oxley was Tasmanian editor for the Australian Poetry Centre's journal Blue Dog (now Australian Poetry Journal). In 2020 she retired from the University of Tasmania, where she worked as an Academic Language and Learning Adviser.

== Works ==
Oxley's two collections, Compound Eye (2003) and Buoyancy (2008) were published by Five Islands Press. Compound Eye was commended in the 2003 Anne Elder Award. Buoyancy was shortlisted in the Western Australian Premier's Literary Awards 2008 | State Library and in manuscript, under the title Open Water, was shortlisted in the ArtsACT Alec Bolton Award 2005. A selection of her poems, Sitting with Cézanne, was published by Picaro Press in its Wagtail series (no. 41, 2005).

Poems by Oxley have won major awards such as the Tom Collins Poetry Prize (2003), the Melbourne Poets Union International Poetry Competition (2006) and the Shoalhaven Literary Award (2012). She has twice won the Henry Kendall Poetry Award (2002, 2008) and the Bruce Dawe National Poetry Prize (2004, 2007).

Oxley's work is also represented in anthologies such as the Best Australian Poetry (UQP) and Best Australian Poems (Black Inc.) volumes. Other anthologies that include her poems are Contemporary Australian Poetry in Chinese Translation (Shanghai: Shanghai Arts and Literature Publishing House 2007), Motherlode: Australian Women's Poetry 1982–2008 (Puncher & Wattman 2008), and Contemporary Australian Poetry (Puncher & Wattman 2016).

The Australian Book Review's Tasmania States of Poetry anthology Series One, 2016 features Oxley's work, including a recording of Oxley reading her poem "Graces Road".

== Reviews of Oxley's works ==
Buoyancy review by Carolyn Fisher, Walleah Press, 2008

Buoyancy review by Martin Duwell, Australian Poetry Review, 2008

Buoyancy review, Canberra Times, 27 December 2008

Buoyancy review, Sunday Tasmanian, 1 February 2009

Buoyancy review, Famous Reporter, June 2009

Buoyancy review, Island Magazine vol.119, 1 January 2009

Compound Eye review by Mark O’Flynn, Walleah Press, 2003

Fitting review, Poempig blog, 2009
