= Mark Tredinnick =

Australian poet, essayist and teacher (born 1962)

Mark Tredinnick OAM (born 1962) is an Australian poet, essayist and teacher. Winner of the Montreal International Poetry Prize in 2011 and the Cardiff International Poetry Competition in 2012. He is the author of thirteen books, including four volumes of poetry (Bluewren Cantos, Fire Diary, The Lyrebird, The Road South); The Blue Plateau; The Little Red Writing Book and Writing Well: the Essential Guide.

== About ==
Mark Tredinnick won the Montreal International Poetry Prize in 2011 and the Cardiff International Poetry Prize in 2012. He has won in recent years, as well as the international prizes, a number of major Australian awards—The Blake and Newcastle Prizes, among them, and a Premier's Literature Prize (for Fire Diary).

Along with his volumes of poetry— Bluewren Cantos (2013), Fire Diary (2010), The Lyrebird (2011), and The Road South (spoken word CD, 2008)— Tredinnick's thirteen books include the landscape memoir, The Blue Plateau (2009), four books on the writing craft, including, The Little Red Writing Book (2006), and Australian Love Poems, which he edited in 2013.

A bilingual (Chinese/English) selection of his poems (The Lyrebird) is due out late in 2014, along with his third collection of poems, Body Copy. He is working on a memoir of a reading life, Reading Slowly at the End of Time (2015).

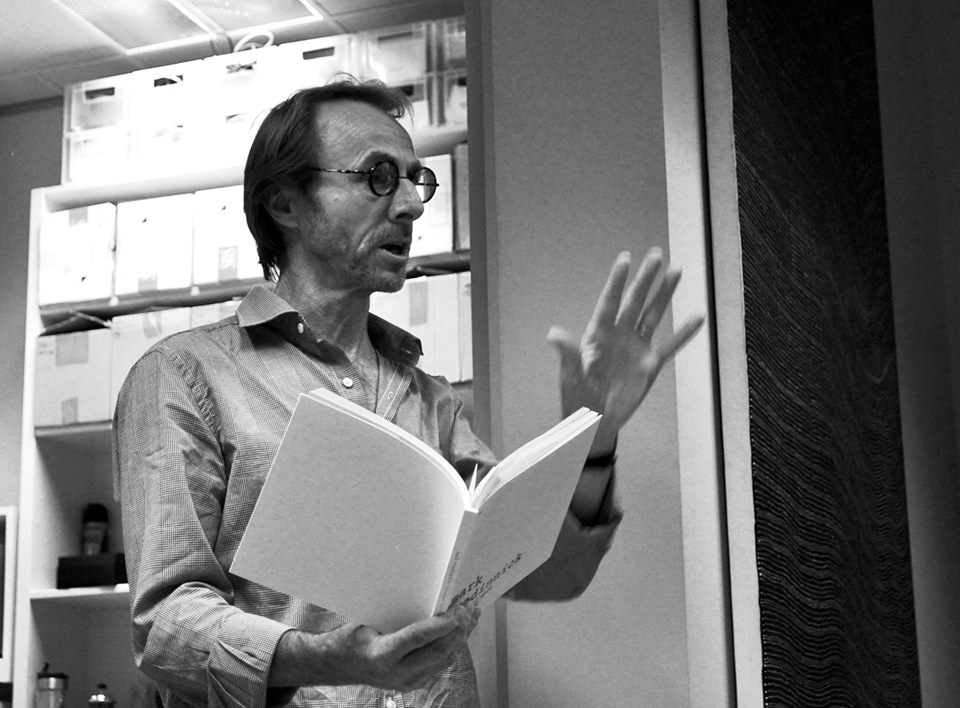
Mark Tredinnick

Although he now writes mainly poetry, Tredinnick continues to write essays, criticism, reviews, and other prose, at his home outside Bowral. He wrote a lot of prose and published several prose books and hundreds of essays before his first poems were published in the early 2005. As well as poetry workshops, Tredinnick teaches literary journalism, creative writing, and creative nonfiction at the University of Sydney, and he has three times been a judge of the NSW Premier's Prize in the nonfiction category, Douglas Stewart Prize. Tredinnick's work, The Blue Plateau, an extended lyric essay on the life of one place on earth, won the Queensland Premier's Literary Award in 2010 and was shortlisted for the Prime Minister's Literary Award the same year.

Tredinnick's poetry and essays are anthologised and published in journals, blogs and newspapers, in Australia and internationally and has appeared in journals including Australian Book Review, Australian Poetry, Contrappasso, Eureka Street, Island, Isotope, Magma, Mascara, Meanjin, New Welsh Review, Orion, PAN, Poetry London, The Scotsman, Southerly, Wet Ink, The Wonderbook of Poetry, and World Literature Today. For nearly twenty years, Tredinnick has taught and lectured poetry, creative nonfiction, grammar, nature writing, and composition at universities (chiefly the University of Sydney). He has been a guest of many literary and poetry festivals around the world, including the Adelaide, Brisbane, Sydney, Perth, Oxford, and Ubud Festivals, and the Ottawa Poetry Festival (VerseFest). He has spent teaching residencies at the Universities of Alaska, Montana, Nebraska, Nevada, the University of Aberystwyth and the University of Wales, Trinity Saint David.

In the 2020 Australia Day Honours Tredinnick was awarded the Medal of the Order of Australia (OAM) for "service to literature, and to education".

== Life ==
Mark Tredinnick was born in Epping, New South Wales. He studied law at the University of Sydney and became a lawyer.

Tredinnick left the corporate world and began to write and teach writing (and some courses in leadership and organizational studies in Politics at the University of Sydney). Tredinnick took his doctorate in 2003 and his thesis was published in 2005

Tredinnick's first book, an edited collection of nature writing essays from Australian and North America, A Place on Earth, came out in 2003 in Australia (2004 in the United States). After that came The Land's Wild Music in 2005; The Little Red Writing Book in 2006; The Little Green Grammar Book in 2008; Writing Well (an adaptation of The Little Red Writing Book for the international market) also in 2008); The Blue Plateau (2009 in Australia; 2010 in the United States); The Little Black Book of Business Writing (with Geoff Whyte) in 2010; Australia's Wild Weather in 2011.

Tredinnick's first collection of poems, The Road South, appeared as a spoken-word CD in 2008. His first volume of poems was Fire Diary, published in late 2010. That was followed by The Lyrebird, a chapbook, in 2011 and Bluewren Cantos in 2013.

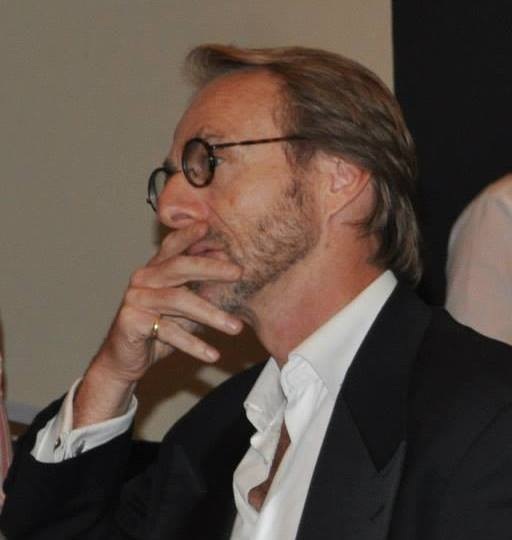
Mark Tredinnick

Tredinnick won a number of major Australian poetry prizes, in particular the Newcastle Poetry Prize in 2007 and the Blake Poetry Prize in 2009. His work became better known outside Australia when he won the inaugural Montreal International Poetry Prize in 2011 and the Cardiff Prize the next year. In Australia, he won the Newcastle Prize second time in 2011 and took out some significant literary prizes for his books: the Queensland Premier's Literary Prize 2010 for The Blue Plateau and the West Australian Premier's Prize 2011 for Fire Diary.

In 2013 he edited Australian Love Poems for a start-up literary press, Inkerman & Blunt. Pitt Street Poetry, who published his second volume of poems, Bluewren Cantos in December 2013, released a second edition of Fire Diary early the following year.

== Awards ==
=== Honours ===
- Medal of the Order of Australia (OAM), 2020
- Golden Tibetan Antelope International Poetry Prize, 2023

=== Books and prose ===
- Western Australian Premier's Book Award (winner, poetry), 2011: Fire Diary
- Queensland Premier's Literary Awards (winner, nonfiction), 2010: The Blue Plateau
- Prime Minister's Literary Awards (shortlisted), 2010: The Blue Plateau
- ACT Book of the Year (shortlisted), 2010: The Blue Plateau
- Alec Bolton Award (highly commended), 2010: Fire Diary
- Calibre Essay Prize, 2007: A Storm & a Teacup
- Wildcare Nature Writing Prize, 2005

=== Poetry ===
- Ron Pretty Poetry Prize, winner 2017: "Panic Very Softly, Love"
- ACU Prize for Literature, winner 2016: "The Horse"
- Cardiff International Poetry Prize, winner 2012: "Margaret River Sestets"
- Montreal International Poetry Prize, winner 2011: "Walking Underwater"
- Newcastle Poetry Prize, winner 2011: "The Wombat Vedas"
- Blake Poetry Prize, winner 2008: "Have You Seen"
- Newcastle Poetry Prize, winner 2007: "Eclogues"
- Gwen Harwood Poetry Prize, winner 2005: "The Child & Time"
- Manchester Poetry Prize (longlist), 2023

== Bibliography ==
For a comprehensive list of Tredinnick's work, see his entry in AustLit.

Collection
Poetry

· A Gathered Distance, Birdfish Books, 2020

· So Far, Birdfish Books, 2019

· Egret in a Ploughed Field, Chinese University Press, 2017

· Anthology: Gardening the Future: An Essay in Plants, Poetry and Image, TCL,

· The Lyrebird & Other Poems (2e), Ginninderra, 2017

· Almost Everything I Know, Flying Island, 2015

· Bluewren Cantos, Pitt Street Poetry, 2013

· Fire Diary (2e), Pitt Street Poetry, 2014

· Australian Love Poems 2013 (Ed), Inkerman & Blunt, 2013

· The Lyrebird (Wagtail 106), Picaro, 2011

· Fire Diary, Puncher & Wattmann, 2010

· The Road South (CD), River Road, 2008

· Prose

· Australia’s Wild Weather, NLA, 2011

· The Blue Plateau, UQP/Milkweed, 2009

· The Land’s Wild Music, Trinity, 2005

· A Place on Earth (Ed), UNSW/ U Nebraska, 2003/04

Books on Writing

· The Little Black Book of Business Writing, New South, 2009 (With Geoff Whyte)

· The Little Green Grammar Book, New South, 2008

· The Little Red Writing Book, New South, 2006

Forthcoming

· Walking Underwater (poems), Pitt Street Poetry, 2020

· A Beginner’s Guide (poems), Recent Works, 2020

· Catchments: One Hundred Poems (new and selected poems): World Literature (China); Milkweed (US) 2021

· A Hundred Miles, As Ever, From Home (poems and paintings)

· Reading Slowly at the End of Time (memoir of the reading life), New South, 2021

· Collected Prose (World Literature, China; New South, Australia)

· The Divide (prose and poetry)

CD

- The road south (CD). River Road. 2008.

List of poems

Title	Year	First published	Reprinted/collected
Landscripts	2014	Tredinnick, Mark (Autumn 2014). "Landscripts". Meanjin. 73 (1): 38–41.	

=== Essays ===
· Nourishing Terrains; or, Solstice (Sydney Review of Books, 2018) https://sydneyreviewofbooks.com/nourishing-terrains-or-solstice/

· Why Write http://www.marktredinnick.com.au/index.php/news/more/why_write/

· The Gospel of Mark http://www.marktredinnick.com.au/index.php/writing/more/the_gospel_of_mark_what_i_believe_and_how_i_work/

· Nature & Me (Scottish Poetry Library Journal, 2012) http://www.marktredinnick.com.au/index.php/writing/more/nature_me/

· Southerly Blogs http://southerlyjournal.com.au/2013/08/09/august-monthly-blogger-mark-tredinnick/

· The Idiom of Love (Foreword to Australian Love Poems 2013)

· Speech Music, ABR, April 2012, no 340)

· The Cool Web (on Judith Beveridge, for Heat 2010) http://www.marktredinnick.com.au/index.php/writing/more/cool_web/

· Under the Mountains & Beside a Creek http://www.marktredinnick.com.au/index.php/writing/more/under_the_mountains_and_beside_a_creek/

· The Lyric Stance (Island Journal, 126, 2011) http://www.marktredinnick.com.au/index.php/writing/more/the_lyric_stance_voice_place_and_the_lyric_essay/

· A Portrait of the Artist as Half a Dozen Places (2009; Meanjin)

· A Storm & a Teacup https://web.archive.org/web/20160304102809/http://www.australianbookreview.com.au/files/Features/Calibre/Calibre_-_Tredinnick_essay.pdf

· Days of Christmas (won the Wildcare Nature Writing Prize, 2004, in Best Australian Essays 2005) http://www.marktredinnick.com.au/index.php/writing/more/days_of_christmas/

· Loneliness and Creativity http://www.marktredinnick.com.au/index.php/news/more/loneliness_and_creativity/

· A Peaceable Revolution (in the book Project Republic, 2013) http://www.marktredinnick.com.au/index.php/writing/more/a_peaceable/

· The Weather of Who We Are (broadcast on “Ockham’s Razor”, Radio National, May 2012; also in Best Australian Science Writing 2013) http://www.abc.net.au/radionational/programs/ockhamsrazor/the-weather-of-who-we-are/4016824;

· A Poet's Guide to Climate Change (broadcast on “Ockham’s Razor”, Radio National 2012) http://www.abc.net.au/radionational/programs/ockhamsrazor/a-poet27s-guide-to-climate-change/4426198

· Getting Over Your Self (Introduction to Sparks, anthology of writing from Uni Sydney creative writing students, 2012) http://www.marktredinnick.com.au/index.php/writing/more/getting_over_your_self/

· Prize Life; Praise Life (Introduction to Award-Winning Australian Writing 2012) http://www.marktredinnick.com.au/index.php/writing/more/prize_life_praise_life/

=== As editor ===
- A Place on Earth (UNSW / U Nebraska, 2003/4)
- Australian Love Poems 2013 (Inkerman and Blunt, 2013)

=== Prose ===
- The Land's Wild Music (Trinity, 2005)
- The Blue Plateau: A Landscape Memoir (UNSW / Milkweed, 2009)
- Australia's Wild Weather (NLA, November 2009)

For a full list, see http://www.austlit.edu.au/austlit/page/A14240?mainTabTemplate=agentWorksBy

=== Non-fiction ===
- The Little Red Writing Book (UNSW, 2006)
- The Little Green Grammar Book (UNSW, 2008)
- Writing Well: The Essential Guide (Cambridge, 2008)
- The Little Black Book of Business Writing with Geoff Whyte (UNSW, 2010)

=== Critical studies and reviews of Tredinnick's work ===
Fire diary

- Ryan, Brendan (September 2011). "Walking the line". Australian Book Review (334): 64.
