= Pitt Street Poetry =

Australian poetry publishing company

Pitt Street Poetry is a Sydney-based poetry imprint.

Founded by Linsay and John Knight in 2012, Pitt Street Poetry aims to publish poetry of lasting value and has published poetry in hardback, paperback and ebook formats. Their books include reprints of classic modern Australian poetry as well as new works. The Literature Assessment Panel of the Australia Council gave an Australian Publishing Program grants to Pitt Street Poetry in 2013-14. and in 2014-5

Martin Duwell in his review of Jean Kent's Travelling with the Wrong Phrasebooks (2012) said the new imprint 'sets a standard in Australian poetry publishing'. The books are distributed through online sales from the publisher's website and a variety of quality booksellers throughout Australia and in Paris and London.

== List of poets published or scheduled for publication ==
- Jenny Blackford
- Eileen Chong
- Tim Cumming
- Luke Davies
- John Foulcher
- Peter Goldsworthy
- Jean Kent
- Lesley Lebkowicz
- Geoff Page
- Ron Pretty
- Melinda Smith
- Mark Tredinnick
- Chris Wallace-Crabbe
- Jakob Ziguras

== See also ==
- Pitt Street Poetry Website
- Radio interview with John Knight, founder of Pitt Street Poetry
- The Poetry Book Society online publisher profile
