= John Foulcher =

Australian poet and teacher

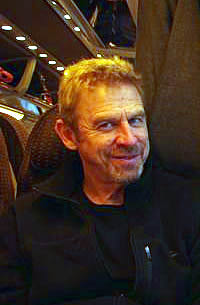
- John Foulcher, 2011
- Born: 7 December 1952 (age 73); Ryde, New South Wales
- Occupations: Poet and teacher
- Known for: Poetry
- Website: http://johnfoulcher.com/

John Foulcher (born 7 December 1952) is an Australian poet and teacher.

== Education ==
Foulcher graduated from Macquarie University with a Bachelor of Arts with Honours and a Diploma of Education. He has been a teacher in New South Wales, Victoria, Australian Capital Territory and taught at Radford College until 2011 followed by Burgmann Anglican School in the Canberra suburb of Gungahlin until retiring in June 2016.

== Literary career ==
His work has been widely anthologised and published in national newspapers and journals including The Age, The Australian, The Sydney Morning Herald, The Bulletin, Quadrant, Heat, Poetry Australia, Meanjin and the New Oxford Book of Australian Verse.

From 1986 to 1994, his poetry was set for study on the New South Wales Higher School Certificate syllabus. He has been the poetry editor of both The Canberra Times and the Voices, the magazine of the National Library. In 2010, he was awarded a writer in residency in Paris at the Cité internationale des arts by the Literature Board of the Australia Council.

In 2012, he joined forces with the Sydney-based poetry imprint Pitt Street Poetry who republished his first collection from 1983 Light Pressure in a pocket format, and followed up with his new book of poetry The Sunset Assumption written during his Australia Council residency in Paris. This new book was published as an e-book, a paperback and a signed and numbered limited hardbound collector's edition with illustrations by Swiss artist Judit Villiger.

== Awards ==
- Prime Minister's Award for Poetry, 2022: shortlisted for Dancing with Stephen Hawking
- ACU Prize for Poetry, 2019: winner for 'Revising Casuarinas'
- Australia Council Residency at the Keesing Studio, Paris 2010–11
- Australia Council Grant for Established Writers, 2003
- ACT Book of the Year, 1994: winner for New and Selected Poems
- National Library Poetry Competition, 1988: joint winner for 'Kosciusko in Summer'
- Australia Council Young Writer's Fellowship, 1980
- Australia Council General Writing Grant, 1977

== Works ==
- Light Pressure (Angus & Robertson 1983, Pitt Street Poetry 2012)
- Pictures from the War (Angus & Robertson 1987)
- Paper Weight (Angus & Robertson 1991)
- New and Selected Poems (Angus & Robertson 1993)
- The Honeymoon Snaps (Angus & Robertson 1996)
- Convertible (Ginninderra Press 2000)
- The Learning Curve (Brandl & Schlesinger, 2002)
- What on Earth Possessed You (Halstead Press 2008)
- The Sunset Assumption (Pitt Street Poetry 2012)
- 101 Poems - selected poetry from nine previous collections (Pitt Street Poetry 2015)
- A Casual Penance (Pitt Street Poetry 2017)
- Dancing with Stephen Hawking (Pitt Street Poetry 2021)
- The Night Stair (Pitt Street Poetry 2025)

== Critical response ==
'Foulcher's The Sunset Assumption confirms his status as a thoughtful, melodious poet, one of seriously investigated religious beliefs, one morally attuned to the need for and the compromises of such beliefs.' Peter Pierce review in The Canberra Times

'Lovely in its poetic balance, The Sunset Assumption is well-crafted with its deep and subtle ‘voice’ and a unique imagination. I fell in love with this book because there is so much questioning and rich beauty within it.' Robyn Rowland in Cordite Poetry Review

'Foulcher has always been a subtle (and non-dogmatic) religious poet. Even to an agnostic or atheist the poems here will almost certainly evoke a powerful sense of strangeness, of something quite-conceivably real but not reducible to words' Geoff Page reviews The Sunset Assumption in Southerly (journal)

'...technically skilled and careful, in the service of precise notations of scenes from the poet's emotional life.' Commentary on Light Pressure in the Oxford Companion to 20th Century Poetry

'Foulcher is not a poet of dramatic gestures or strident convictions; rather, he is a poet of implications, implications that come from closely observed and imaginatively recreated particulars; ones that readers will almost certainly recognise as part of their own lives'. Geoff Page (ed) A Reader's Guide to Contemporary Australian Poetry UQP 1995.

'Simple, direct and convincing, Foulcher's poetry reflects common human experiences - joy in the present, regret for the errors and omissions of the past and faith, mixed with a dash of apprehension, for the future'. Wilde, Hooton and Andrews (eds) The Oxford Companion to Australian Literature OUP 1995

== See also ==
- List of Australian poets
- JohnFoulcher.com
- John Foulcher on AustLit
- Excel Studies in Literature: The Poetry of John Foulcher (Dr Barry Spurr, Pascal Press 1993) ISBN 9781875312641
- Get Smart Study Guide: John Foulcher (Margaret Berg, Science Press, 1996) ISBN 9780855832599
