= Eileen Chong (poet) =

Australian poet

- Chong in 2026
- Born: 1980 (age 45–46); Singapore
- Occupation: Poet
- Writing career
- Language: English
- Years active: 2004–
- Notable work: Painting Red Orchids; We Speak of Flowers
- Notable awards: South Australian Literary Awards, Premier's Award & John Bray Poetry Award; 2026 We Speak of Flowers

Eileen Chong (born 1980) is an Australian contemporary poet.

== Early life and education ==
Chong was born in Singapore in 1980. She is of Hakka, Hokkien, and Peranakan descent. She grew up speaking English, Mandarin, and Hokkien. Chong studied English language and literature at the National Institute of Education in Singapore and taught literature in secondary schools.

She migrated to Sydney, Australia, in 2007. After moving to Sydney she undertook a Masters of Letters at the University of Sydney.

Eileen Chong reflected on her upbringing and its influence on themes in her writing:

"To paraphrase Wittgenstein, the limits of the world I grew up in were very much defined by the language of food. Ancestor worship and veneration centered around food offerings; my grandparents and parents certainly never told me they loved me when I was growing up, but they would ask if I was hungry, and they would do whatever it took to feed me, and they fed me well."

== Career ==
Chong was awarded the Poets Union Youth Fellowship in 2010.

In 2011–12, Chong was an Australian Poetry Fellow, which led to the publication of her first book Burning Rice.

In 2016, Chong was poet-in-residence at the Royal Botanic Garden Sydney and the Bundanon Trust.

From 2019 to 2023, Chong's first book, Burning Rice, was on the New South Wales’ Higher School Certificate syllabus for English Extension . This book was the first poetry collection by an Asian-Australian poet to be on the New South Wales’ English syllabus for the Higher School Certificate from 2019 to 2023. Chong's poem, ‘My Hakka Grandmother’, is part of a suite of poems from Contemporary Asian Australian Poets on the NSW HSC syllabus for English, 2019–2023.

When Chong's collection Painting Red Orchids was shortlisted for the Prime Minister's Literary Awards the judging panel described it as an "exploration of the contemplative and the personal within subtly shifting contexts of food, love, history and culture" and lauded her "technical confidence and linguistic sophistication" which "contain depths and resonances which repay repeated attention and thought."

Reviewing Chong's fifth collection of poems A Thousand Crimson Blooms, Terri Ann Quan Sung writing in the Sydney Review of Books described it as a collection of "tight and perfect poems burning with intensity and sensuality."

Singaporean-Australian poet Boey Kim Cheng said that Chong's work "offers a poetry of feeling, rendered in luminous detail and language, alive to the sorrows and joys of daily living."

== Personal life ==
She is married to Colin Cassidy, an artist and designer.

== Selected bibliography ==
- The Uncommon Feast (single-author essays, poems, and recipes) (2018) Introduction by Judith Beveridge, illustrations by Colin Cassidy. Recent Work Press, Canberra, Australia.

=== Poetry collections ===
- Burning Rice (2012) Australian Poetry New Voices Series 2012, Melbourne, Australia. Reprinted 2013. Pitt Street Poetry, Sydney, Australia.
- Peony (2014) Pitt Street Poetry, Sydney, Australia.
- Painting Red Orchids (2016) Pitt Street Poetry, Sydney, Australia.
- Another Language (2017) Foreword by Paul Kane; George Braziller, New York City, USA.
- Rainforest (2018) Pitt Street Poetry, Sydney, Australia.
- Map-Making (2018), Photographs by Charlene Winfred; Potts Point Press, Sydney, Australia.
- Dark Matter (2018) International Poetry Studies Institute, with Recent Work Press, Canberra, Australia.
- A Thousand Crimson Blooms (2021) University of Queensland Press, Brisbane, Australia.
- We Speak of Flowers (2025) University of Queensland Press, Brisbane, Australia.

=== Anthologies ===
- Aitken, Adam; Boey, Kimcheng; Cahill, eds. (2012). Contemporary Asian Australian Poets. Puncher & Wattmann. ISBN 978-1-921450-65-5. OCLC 829058589.

== Awards ==
- 2013 – Prime Minister's Literary Awards for Poetry, Burning Rice, shortlisted
- 2017 – Prime Minister's Literary Awards for Poetry, Painting Red Orchids, shortlisted
- 2017 – Victorian Premier's Literary Award for Poetry, Painting Red Orchids, shortlisted
- 2019 – NSW Premier's Literary Awards, Multicultural Award, Rainforest, shortlisted
- 2022 – NSW Premier's Literary Awards, Kenneth Slessor Prize for Poetry, A Thousand Crimson Blooms, shortlisted
- 2026 – South Australian Literary Awards, Premier's Award and the John Bray Poetry Award, We Speak of Flowers, winner
