= The Viewfinder =

1996 poetry collection by Anthony Lawrence

- Author: Anthony Lawrence
- Language: English
- Genre: Poetry collection
- Publisher: University of Queensland Press
- Publication date: 1996
- Publication place: Australia
- Media type: Print
- Pages: 100 pp.
- Awards: 1997 NSW Premier's Prize for Poetry, winner
- ISBN: 0702228818

The Viewfinder is a collection of poems by Australian poet Anthony Lawrence, published by University of Queensland Press in 1996.

The collection contains 75 poems from a variety of sources, with some published here for the first time.

The collection won the 1997 NSW Premier's Prize for Poetry.

== Contents ==
- "Retirement"
- "Insects"
- "Another Thing"
- "Greetings"
- "Primary Industry"
- "Rats"
- "A Field in Tennessee"
- "Reincarnation"
- "Alchemy"
- "1773"
- "A Dublin Market"
- "The Skate"
- "Coma"
- "Sherwood Forest, 1925"
- "Spanish Point"
- "The Driver"
- "Aubade with Dying River"
- "Gathering Seed"
- "The Name, the Bird"
- "The Line"
- "The Dark Ship (for Marijke)"
- "Oberon"
- "Bullfights and Hemingway - a Modified History"
- "Laura Riding"
- "Raymond"
- "Self Loathing"
- "Grief"
- "Failed Libido"
- "Depression"
- "Anxiety"
- "Lethargy"
- "Remedies That Don't Work"
- "Lone Pine Road"
- "The Beauty Forge (for Tracy Ryan)"
- "Involuntary Actions and Thought Control"
- "Tinnitus"
- "Slipjigs and Reels : Psychiatric Hospital, Cork, Ireland, 1981"
- "Slipjigs and Reels : Allihies/Innishmoor : Allihies"
- "Slipjigs and Reels : Allihies/Innishmoor : Innishmoor"
- "Slipjigs and Reels : Skibbereen"
- "Slipjigs and Reels : In a Bar Overlooking the Harbour"
- "What the Crayfisherman Said"
- "Dead Men's Fingers"
- "Tattoo"
- "Bird Park"
- "Wetlands"
- "Wildflowers, Tallering Station"
- "Globe"
- "Whatever Passes Through"
- "Blackheath Cemetery"
- "Dusk Light and Approaching Snow, Porter's Pass"
- "Watching Gipsies Work"
- "The Protestant Cemetery, Rome"
- "The Downhill"
- "The Rat's Tail and the Knives"
- "The Fire-Danger Bird"
- "Gold"
- "Cricket : Bouncer"
- "Cricket : Bodyline"
- "Cricket : Television"
- "Cricket : Radio"
- "Cricket : Those Feral Australians : 1"
- "Cricket : Those Feral Australians : 2"
- "Cricket : Umpire Crafter Says No"
- "Ezra Pound"
- "Dugite Skeletons"
- "Datura"
- "Airsong"
- "Reading the Runes (for Roshan Groves)"
- "The Chess Heads"
- "John Berryman in Dublin"
- "Italian Television"
- "Scars"
- "The Task"
- "Testaccio"

== Critical reception ==
On the volume's shortlisting for the 1996 The Age Book of the Year Award – Poetry Award the judges called the poems "meticulous in their lyrical detail." They continued: "This poetry believes both in the virtue of recording – the tiniest movements of the human body, what lies beneath the carapace of blue swimming crabs, the intricacies of Italian television – and in seeing beyond the form."

In a review of the volume for Quadrant magazine, Alison Croggin noted that it "has the showiness of a small-time gangster." She concluded: "Lawrence creates a superficial disturbance, a sense of something nasty in the woodshed, often allied with a kind of associative sentiment (as in 'John Berryman in Dublin'). But he never opens the door."

== Awards ==
- 1996 The Age Book of the Year Award – Poetry, shortlisted
- 1997 NSW Premier's Prize for Poetry

== Notes ==
- Dedication: For Anita Hoving

== See also ==
- 1996 in Australian literature
