= Have Been and Are =

2016 poetry collection by Brook Emery

- Author: Brook Emery
- Genre: Poetry collection
- Publisher: Gloria SMH Press
- Publication date: 2016
- Publication place: Australia
- Media type: Print
- Pages: 70pp.
- ISBN: 978-0-9945-2753-0
- Dewey Decimal: A821.3
- Preceded by: Collusion
- Followed by: Sea Scale

Have Been and Are (2016) is a collection of poetry by the Australian writer Brook Emery. (Note: The collection's title ("Have Been and Are") and the title of its penultimate poem ("Endless forms most beautiful and wonderful") were taken from the very last sentence in Darwin's Origin of Species (1859): "Thus, from the war of nature, from famine and death, the most exalted object which we are capable of conceiving, namely, the production of the higher animals, directly follows. There is grandeur in this view of life, with its several powers, having been originally breathed into a few forms or into one; and that, whilst this planet has gone cycling on according to the fixed law of gravity, from so simple a beginning endless forms most beautiful and most wonderful have been, and are being, evolved.")

== Contents ==
The collection contains 39 poems, some of which had been previously published. As Jenny Henty notes in her (2017) review, "the title of each poem (except the last) is a quotation from a novelist, poet, scientist, philosopher or composer".

- "And the word 'environment' "
- "Brain doesn't improvise"
- "We are lashed to our body"
- "The poet is a centipede"
- "Body is but a striving"
- "At the end of the mind"
- "To get the better of words"
- "The poem must"
- "The rain falls down"
- "The most important experience of being"
- "I'm not sure"
- "World without hope"
- "I, too, find the flower beautiful"
- "No more than"
- "To make the universe"
- "We behold all things"
- "Everything waste"
- "Only keep still, wait, and hear"
- "Echo, repetition, statement"
- "Stately, plump Buck Mulligan" (Note: Malachi Roland St. John "Buck" Mulligan is a fictional character in James Joyce's 1922 novel Ulysses. The poem's title is taken from the novel's opening passage: "Stately, plump Buck Mulligan came from the stairhead, bearing a bowl of lather on which a mirror and a razor lay crossed. A yellow dressinggown, ungirdled, was sustained gently behind him by the mild morning air. He held the bowl aloft and intoned: Introibo ad altare Dei.")
- "A steady delete"
- "The right time to write"
- "The situation is hopeless"
- "The brown current"
- "A preposterous hodgepodge"
- "What were they then"
- "He was describing, "
- "The lightness, the non-mass of it"
- "There on the shore"
- "But it would be loathsome stiff"
- "Drive, he sd" (Note: "drive, he sd, for/christ’s sake, look/out where yr going.": Creeley, Robert (1962), "I Know a Man", p.38, For Love: Poems 1950–1960, New York: Charles Scribner's Sons. ISBN 0-684-71738-7 — also, see: "I Know a Man", at Poetry Foundation.)
- "I should be rolling down the skyway"
- "If you write deplorable twaddle"
- "You want ghosts"
- "What is spoken is never"
- "A spring day like this"
- "Endless forms most beautiful and wonderful"
- "Broken / Beautiful"

== Critical reception ==
The collection has been reviewed.

== See also ==
- 2016 in Australian literature
- 2016 in poetry
