= Brendan Ryan (poet) =

Australian poet, born 1963

- Born: December 4, 1963 (age 62); Panmure, Victoria, Australia
- Occupation: Poet

Brendan Ryan (born 4 December 1963) is a present-day Australian poet. Much of his work concerns rural life.

== Life and work ==
Ryan grew up on a dairy farm at Panmure, Victoria. He now lives in Geelong, Victoria, where he teaches English at a secondary college. Ryan's poetry, reviews and essays have appeared in journals and newspapers, including The Best Australian Poems series (Black Inc). In 2007, he was awarded the Longlines Residency at Varuna. Of his four collections of poetry – Why I Am Not a Farmer, 2000, A Paddock in His Head, 2007, A Tight Circle, 2008, Travelling through the Family, 2012, and Small Town Soundtrack in 2015 – A Paddock in his Head was shortlisted for the 2008 ACT Poetry Prize and Travelling Through the Family (Hunter Publishers) for the 2014 Victorian Premier's Awards.

Writing in Australian Book Review No. 382, Peter Kenneally calls Ryan's style both "cinematic and musical". A piece by Ryan was a rare inclusion of poetry in a 2016 non-fiction book by Don Watson entitled A Single Tree; a book which was widely lauded for insights into rural Australian life over a long period.

In 2019, Ryan's sixth book was published: The Lowlands of Moyne.

In 2023, Recent Work Press released "Feldspar". In a live presentation in Port Fairy in 2022, Ryan referred to a new collection in progress called 'Escape to the Country' which may have been this title.

== Bibliography ==
=== Poetry ===
- Why I Am Not a Farmer (2000)
- A Paddock in His Head (2007)
- A Tight Circle (2008)
- Travelling Through the Family (2012)
- Small Town Soundtrack (2015)
- The Lowlands of Moyne (2019)
- Feldspar (2023)

=== Book reviews ===
Year	Review article	Work(s) reviewed
2011	"Walking the line". Australian Book Review (334): 64. September 2011.	Tredinnick, Mark (2011). Fire diary. Puncher & Wattmann.
