= Uncommon Light =

2007 poetry collection by Brook Emery

- Author: Brook Emery
- Genre: Poetry collection
- Publisher: Five Islands Press
- Publication date: 2007
- Publication place: Australia
- Media type: Print
- Pages: 72pp.
- ISBN: 978-0-7340-3762-6
- Dewey Decimal: A821.4
- Preceded by: At a Slight Angle
- Followed by: Collusion

Uncommon Light (2007) is a collection of poetry by the Australian writer Brook Emery.

== Contents ==
The collection contains 32 poems.

- "Very Like a Whale"
- "Spring"
- "Morning: Thinking of You"
- "Finches Perhaps"
- "Monster"
- "Moon"
- "Sunday: '(Everything Can Be) Transformed, "
- "That Beat Against the Cage"
- "'Am I Really the Person Who Bears My Name?'"
  - "1. This Confusion"
  - "2. The Mystery of It"
  - "3. That Much a Part"
  - "4. Wanting More"
  - "5. Just Where He Is"
- "Winter Rain"
- "Nevertheless Also There"
- "Making a Presence"
- "Monster"
- "Tourism: What the I Sees"
- "This Disenchanted World"
- "Uncommon Light"
- "Thirty-Six Views of Bondi Beach"
- "Switch"
- "Monster"
- "Landscape"
- "Story"
- "Narcissus: Self-Portrait with Sea"
- "Still Life with Sun and Figs"
- "Half-Glimpsed Through Water"
- "Feeding Birds"
- "Against Immortality"
- "Monster"
- "Spring is Still Spring (Summer) "

== Awards and nominations ==
- Short-listed — Kenneth Slessor Prize for Poetry (New South Wales Premier's Literary Awards) (2008).

== Critical reception ==
The collection has been reviewed.

== See also ==
- 2007 in Australian literature
- 2007 in poetry
