= Anthony Lawrence (poet) =

Australian poet and novelist (born 1957)

- Born: 1957 (age 68–69); Tamworth, New South Wales, Australia
- Occupation: Poet
- Writing career
- Notable awards: 1997 New South Wales Premier's Literary Awards — Kenneth Slessor Prize for Poetry, winner

Anthony Lawrence (born 1957 in Tamworth) is a contemporary Australian poet and novelist. He has received a number of Australia Council for the Arts Literature Board Grants, including a Fellowship. He has won many awards for his poetry, including the inaugural Judith Wright Calanthe Award, the Gwen Harwood Memorial Prize, and the Newcastle Poetry Prize (three times). His 2016 collection, Headwaters (Pitt Street Poetry), was awarded the Prime Minister's Literary Award for Poetry in 2017.

== Published works ==
=== Poetry ===
- Ordinary Time, with Audrey Molloy Pitt Street Poetry, 2022 ISBN 9781922080134
- Ken, Gazebo Books, 2021 ISBN 9780648901174
- Time Machine, Calanthe Press, ISBN 9780648574002
- 101 Poems, Pitt Street Poetry, 2018 ISBN 9781922080622
- Headwaters, Pitt Street Poetry, 2016 ISBN 9781922080608
- Signal Flare, Puncher & Wattman, 2013 ISBN 9781922186355
- The Welfare of My Enemy, Puncher & Wattman, 2011 ISBN 9781921450495
- Bark, University of Queensland Press, 2008 ISBN 9780702236648
- Words & Music, Picaro Press, 2008 ISBN 9781920957599
- Magnetic Field, Picaro Press, 2008 ISBN 9781920957582
- Strategies for Confronting Fear : New and Selected Poems, Arc Publications, 2006 ISBN 9781900072496
- The Sleep of a Learning Man, Giramondo Publishing, 2003 ISBN 1920882014
- Skinned by Light : Poems 1989–2002, University of Queensland Press, 2002 ISBN 0702233439
- New and Selected Poems, University of Queensland Press, 1998 ISBN 0702229806
- The Viewfinder, University of Queensland Press, 1996 ISBN 0702228818
- Cold Wires of Rain, Penguin Books, 1995 ISBN 0140587276
- The Darkwood Aquarium, Penguin Books, 1993 ISBN 0140586938
- Three Days Out of Tidal Town, Hale and Iremonger, 1992 ISBN 0868064475
- Ultramarine, with John Kinsella, Folio, 1991 ISBN 0646078380
- Dreaming in Stone, Angus and Robertson, 1989 ISBN 0207160783

=== Fiction ===
- In the Half-Light Picador, Australia and UK, and Carroll & Graff, USA, 2000 ISBN 0330362690

=== As editor ===
- The Best Australian Poetry 2004 University of Queensland Press, 2004.

== Awards ==
- Australian Catholic University Prize for Poetry, 2023: second prize
- Peter Porter Poetry Prize, 2022: winner for "In the Shadows of Our Heads"
- Prime Minister's Literary Award for Poetry, 2017: winner for Headwaters
- Newcastle Poetry Prize 2015
- Philip Hodgins Medal. Awarded at the 2015 Mildura Writers Festival
- Newcastle Poetry Prize 2014. (jointly with Debi Hamilton)
- 6th Blake Poetry Prize 2013: winner for "Appellations"
- Peter Porter Poetry Prize, 2010: winner for "Domestic Emergencies"
- The Age Book of the Year Awards, Dinny O'Hearn Poetry Prize, 2008: shortlisted for Bark
- Queensland Premier's Literary Awards, Arts Queensland, Judith Wright Calanthe Prize for Poetry, 2008: shortlisted for Bark
- Peter Porter Poetry Prize, 2007: shortlisted for "Guidance and Knowledge" (Note: Prize known as the ABR Poetry Prize in 2007.)
- Tasmania Book Prizes, Tasmania Book Prize, 2005: shortlisted for The Sleep of a Learning Man
- The Age Book of the Year Awards, poetry, 2004: shortlisted for The Sleep of a Learning Man
- Victorian Premier's Literary Awards, The C. J. Dennis Prize for Poetry, 2004: shortlisted for The Sleep of a Learning Man
- Colin Roderick Award, 2002: shortlisted for Skinned by Light : Poems 1989 – 2002
- Josephine Ulrick National Poetry Prize, 2001: winner for "The Rain"
- Inaugural Judith Wright Calanthe Award, 1999: winner for New and Selected Poems
- NSW Premier's Literary Awards, Kenneth Slessor Prize for Poetry, 1997: winner for The Viewfinder
- The Age Book of the Year Award – Poetry, 1996: shortlisted for The Viewfinder
- Grace Perry Memorial Award, 1988: runner-up for "Blood Oath"
