= Tug Dumbly =

Australian musician and poet

Tug Dumbly is the pseudonym of Australian performance poet and musician Geoff Forrester. He has released two albums, Junk Culture Lullabies (2001) and Idiom Savant (2003) through the ABC. He first rose to prominence as a regular guest on the national radio station Triple J and then local ABC radio 702 (now ABC Radio Sydney). For many years he was the front man for spoken word night Bardflys at The Friend in Hand, Hotel, Glebe.

Two-time winner of the Banjo Paterson Prize for comic verse, once for his 8000-word epic ode to meat Barbeque Bill and the Roadkill Café, in 2010 he was named the winner of Nimbin Performance Poetry World Cup. He went on to be co-winner in 2011 and winner of the people's choice in 2014 at the Nimbin Performance Poetry World Cup

In 2015 he was announced 2nd place prize winner of the Griffith University Josephine Ulrick Poetry Prize.
