= Outdoor Swimming Society =

The Outdoor Swimming Society (OSS) is a UK-based non-profit founded in 2006 to promote outdoor and wild swimming. It claims to have over 200,000 members.

The Outdoor Swimming Society was founded by Kate Rew, whose book Wild Swim (2008) contributed to the resurgence of interest in wild swimming in the UK.

== Activities ==
In 2006, OSS launched a website mapping outdoor swimming spots in the UK. The website was taken down during the COVID-19 pandemic. The organization campaigns for what it describes "right to swim" for swimming access to public waters including by organizing direct actions including trespassing. The OSS organizes outdoor swims as fundraising activities.
