= David Musgrave =

Australian poet, publisher and critic (born 1965)

- Born: 1965 (age 60–61); Sydney, Australia
- Education: University of Sydney (PhD)
- Spouse: Fiona Robards
- Writing career
- Genre: Poetry

David Musgrave (born 1965) is an Australian poet, novelist, publisher and critic. He is the founder of and publisher at Puncher & Wattmann, an independent press which publishes Australian poetry and literary fiction. He is also Deputy Chair of Australian Poetry Limited.

== Life and career ==
Musgrave was born in Sydney and educated at Sydney University where in 1997 he received a PhD for his thesis on the topic of Menippean satire. He worked for a number of years as a CIO in the Health Insurance industry. He currently lectures in creative writing at the University of Newcastle.

His first book, To Thalia (Five Islands Press), was published and commended in the 2004 Anne Elder Award; it was followed by On Reflection (Interactive) in 2005 and Watermark (Picaro) in 2006. "Phantom Limb" (John Leonard Press) was awarded the Grace Leven Prize for Poetry in 2011. Several of his poems have won major awards in Australia, including having twice won the Newcastle Poetry Prize in 2008 and 2012, and was the local winner in 2021. His novel Glissando: a Melodrama (Sleepers), published in 2010 was critically well received and short listed for the Prime Minister's Award for Fiction in 2011 and the UTS Glenda Adams Prize for new writing. His book-length poem Anatomy of Voice (GloriaSMH, 2016) was awarded the Judith Wright Calanthe Prize for Poetry in 2016.

He has published numerous articles on Australian literature, including on Norman Lindsay's The Magic Pudding and David Ireland's The Unknown Industrial Prisoner. He has also written on The Black Dog and Depression (published in Tracking the Black Dog by the Black Dog Institute and published articles on Samuel Beckett and the Ern Malley hoax. His latest poetry collection is Selected Poems, published by Eyewear Press in 2021. His study on Menippean Satire in English since the Renaissance, Grotesque Anatomies, was published by Cambridge Scholars Press in 2014. Mishearing was published by Gorilla Books in 2024 and The Kool-Aid Dispenser was published by Recent Work Press in 2025..

== Awards ==
- 1986 – Henry Lawson Prize for Poetry for the poem Afternoon Ambience
- 1987 – Henry Lawson Prize for Poetry for the poem Budapest
- 1987 – Sydney University Prize for English Verse for the poem What I did on Sunday
- 1994 – Sidney Nolan Gallery Poetry Prize for the poem Glenrowan
- 2001 – Poets Union/Broadway Poetry Prize for the poem Lagoon
- 2003 – Bruce Dawe National Poetry Prize for the poem Minneapolis
- 2004 – Shortlisted for the Anne Elder Award for To Thalia
- 2006 – Highly commended in the Newcastle Poetry Prize for the sequence Open Water
- 2008 – The Josephine Ulrick Poetry Prize for the poem Grace
- 2008 – Newcastle Poetry Prize for the poem The Baby Boomers
- 2008 – Alec Bolton prize for the unpublished manuscript Phantom Limb
- 2010 – Grace Leven Prize for Poetry for Phantom Limb
- 2011 – Prime Minister's Literary Awards for Fiction, shortlisted for Glissando: A Melodrama
- 2011 – Shortlisted for the UTS Glenda Adams Award for new fiction for Glissando: A Melodrama
- 2012 – Shortlisted for the Blake Poetry Prize for "Nine Crab Barn"
- 2012 – Newcastle Poetry Prize for the poem "Coastline"
- 2016 – Queensland Literary Awards – State Library of Queensland Poetry Collection – Judith Wright Calanthe Award for Anatomy of a Voice

== Publications ==
=== Poetry ===
- To Thalia (2004)
- On Reflection, or, A Twenty-twenty vision: A novelty (2005) ISBN 9781876819279
- Watermark: And other poems (2006)
- Phantom Limb (2009)
- Concrete Tuesday (2011)
- Anatomy of a Voice (2015) ISBN 9780994527509
- Numb and Number (2019) ISBN 9781925780383
- Selected Poems (2021)
- Mishearing (2024)
- The Kool-Aid Dispenser (2025)

=== Other writing ===
- Glissando: A melodrama (2010) ISBN 9781740669337
- Grotesque Anatomies: Menippean satire since the Renaissance (2014)
- Contemporary Australian Poetry (edited with J. Beveridge, J. Johnson and M. Langford) (2015)
- Feeding the Ghost 1: Criticism on Contemporary Australian Poetry (edited with A. Kissane and C. Rickett) (2018)
