= Newcastle Poetry Prize =

Australian poetry award

The Newcastle Poetry Prize is an annual Australian award for Australian poetry, administered by Hunter Writers' Centre. It has been awarded since 1981, when it was first established as the Mattara Poetry Prize.

The Prize began in September 1980 when Peter Goldman handed out an anthology of poetry at the Mattara Festival.

This anthology prompted two lecturers at the University of Newcastle, Christopher Pollnitz and Paul Kavanagh, to seek funding for a poetry competition which paved the way for the first official Mattara Poetry Prize in 1981. This prize went on to become known as the Newcastle Poetry Prize.

Today, the Prize receives entries from across the nation.

== Winners ==
Source: The Newcastle Poetry Prize on AustLit

- 2026: Greg McLaren (Late sonnets)
- 2024: Christopher 'Kit' Kelen (Dombóvár)
- 2023: Kevin Smith (The Crossing)
- 2022: Claire Albrecht (The Anabranch)
- 2021: Lachlan Brown (Any Saturday, 2021, Running Westward)
- 2020: Damen O'Brien (Measures of Truth)
- 2019: Chloe Wilson (Soft Serve)
- 2018: Ross Gillett (Buying Online)
- 2017: Lucy Williams (The Crows in Town)
- 2016: John Watson (The Dangar Island Garbage Boat)
- 2015: Anthony Lawrence (Connective Tissue)
- 2013: Jennifer Compton (Now You Shall Know)
- 2012: David Musgrave (Coastline)
- 2011: Mark Tredinnick (The Wombat Vedas)
- 2010: Duncan Hose (An Allegory of Edward Trouble)
- 2009: Patricia Sykes (Cassandra Vegas)
- 2008: David Musgrave (The Baby Boomers)
- 2007: Mark Tredinnick (Eclogues)
- 2006: Nathan Shepherdson (Eve 1528)
- 2005: Emma Jones (Zoos for the Dead)
- 2004: Peter Kirkpatrick (Bucolic Plague or This Eco-Lodge My Prison)
- 2001/2002: Emma Jones (Fugue, or a Possible Poem) John Watson (A Jetty Completely Surrounded) Jo Gardiner (Song to the Moon) Judy Johnson (Three Faces of Shiva)
- 2000: Philip Salom (Preservation: Things in Glass)
- 1999: Brook Emery (Approaching the Edge)
- 1997: Anthony Lawrence (Skinned By Light & Thanatos)
- 1996: Philip Salom (Elegy for my Father) Roland Leach (East Timor) David Brooks (Back After Eight Months Away)
- 1995: Roland Leach (drowning Ophelia: the madness poems)
- 1991: Dorothy Hewett (Upside Down Sonnets)
- 1989: John Bennett (Blackwattle)
- 1988: Kristopher Saknussemm (Group of eight poems)
- 1987: Dane Thwaites (Imitations of Han Shan) Tracy Ryan (Streams in the Desert)
- 1986: Lily Brett (Poland)
- 1985: Diane Fahey (Poem of Thanksgiving)
- 1984: John A. Scott (St. Clair)
- 1983: Craig Powell (Five Pieces For a Homecoming)
- 1982: Peter Kocan (From the Private Poems of Governor Caulfield)
- 1981: Kevin Hart ('The Storm' and others) and Les Murray ('Machine Portraits with Pendant Spaceman')

== New Media Winners ==
- [2009]: [Rob Walker and Ben Walker] (Bibliophobia)
- [2008]: [Jason Nelson] (Wittenoom) joint winner with [Paul White] (Don't read too much into it)
- [2007]: [Rob Walker and Matt Walker] (Moon Anti-Poem)
- [2006]: [Philip Norton] (Hypnosis)

== Anthologies ==
- "Late sonnets", Hunter Writers' Centre, Newcastle 2026
- "Dombóvár", Hunter Writers' Centre, Newcastle 2024
- "The Crossing", Hunter Writers' Centre, Newcastle 2023
- "The Anabranch", Hunter Writers' Centre, Newcastle 2022
- "Any Saturday, 2021, Running Westward", Hunter Writers' Centre, Newcastle 2021
- "Measures of Truth", Hunter Writers' Centre, Newcastle 2020
- "Soft Serve", Hunter Writers' Centre, Newcastle 2019
- "Buying Online", Hunter Writers' Centre, Newcastle 2018
- "The Crows in Town", Hunter Writers' Centre, Newcastle 2017
- "The Dangar Island Garbage Boat", Hunter Writers' Centre, Newcastle 2016
- "Connective Tissue", Hunter Writers' Centre, Newcastle 2015
- "Once Wild", Hunter Writers' Centre, Newcastle 2014
- "Now You Shall Know", Hunter Writers' Centre, Newcastle 2013
- "Coastline", Hunter Writers' Centre, Newcastle 2012
- "Completely Surrounded: Thirty Years of the Newcastle Poetry Prize 1981-2011", Hunter Writers' Centre, Newcastle 2011
- "The Wombat Vedas", ed. Jennifer Harrison and Keri Glastonbury, Hunter Writers' Centre, Newcastle 2011
- "Time With the Sky", ed. Jill Jones and Anthony Lawrence, Hunter Writers' Centre, Newcastle 2010
- The Night Road, ed. Philip Salom and Jill Jones, Hunter Writers' Centre, Newcastle 2009
- to sculpt the moment, ed. Jan Owen, Hunter Writers' Centre, Newcastle, 2008.
- Eclogues, ed. Martin Harrison, John Jenkins and Jan Owen, Hunter Writers' Centre, Newcastle, 2007.
- the honey fills the cone, ed. Judith Beveridge, Martin Harrison and Jean Kent, Hunter Writers' Centre, Newcastle, 2006.
- sunweight,, ed. Judy Johnson, Judith Beveridge & Brian Joyce, Hunter Writers' Centre, Newcastle, 2005.
- The Cool Breath Burn, (CD) ed. John Bennet, Judy Johnson & Lizz Murphy, Hunter Writers' Centre, Newcastle, 2004.
- Unfamiliar Tides, 2001/2002.
- Time's Collision with the Tongue, ed. Peter Boyle and Jan Owen, 2000.
- The Argument from Desire, ed. Ron K. Pretty, Five Islands Press, Wollongong, 1999.
- The Nightjar, ed. John Hawke, Coal River Press, Newcastle, 1997.
- The New World Tattoo, ed. John Hawke, Coal River Press, Newcastle, 1996.
- Let Dark Memory Bloom, ed. Paul Kavanagh. Newcastle: Coal River Press, 1995.
- The Sea’s White Edge, ed. Paul Kavanagh. Springwood: Butterfly Books, 1991.
- Pictures from an Exhibition, ed. Paul Kavanagh, Mattara Poetry Prize, University of Newcastle, 1989.
- The International Terminal, ed. Christopher Pollnitz. University of Newcastle, 1988.
- Properties of the Poet, ed. Paul Kavanagh. University of Newcastle, 1987.
- An Inflection of Silence, ed. Christopher Pollnitz. University of Newcastle, 1986.
- Poem of Thanksgiving, ed. Paul Kavanagh, University of Newcastle, 1985.
- Neither Nuked nor Crucified, ed. Christopher Pollnitz. University of Newcastle, 1984.
- Instructions for Honey Ants, ed. Paul Kavanagh, University of Newcastle, 1983.
- Lines from the Horizon and Other Poems, ed. Christopher Pollnitz. University of Newcastle, 1982.
- The Members of the Orchestra, ed. Paul Kavanagh, University of Newcastle, 1981.
