= Blake Poetry Prize =

Australian poetry prize

The Blake Poetry Prize is an Australian poetry prize for a new work of 100 lines or less, focused on non-sectarian spiritual and religious topics, connected to the Blake Prize, an art prize. The prize, worth A$5,000, is presented biennially by the Casula Powerhouse Arts Centre (CPAC) in conjunction with the bookshop Westwords.

== History ==
The prize was established in 2008 by the Blake Society in conjunction with the New South Wales Writers' Centre (now Writing NSW), funded by Leichhardt Council in Sydney. The Blake Prize takes its name from visionary poet and artist William Blake.

After the Blake Society had lost sponsorship for its art prizes in 2015, CPAC and Liverpool City Council announced that they would be funding and managing the prizes from 2016, with the exhibition and awards moving to Casula in Western Sydney.

From 2017, it was intended that Liverpool City Library in conjunction with CPAC, would deliver the Blake Poetry Prize as a biennial event. However, WestWords (Western Sydney's Literature Development Organisation) took over the partnership from the library.

== Description ==
A A$5,000 prize is offered every two years for a new poem of 100 lines or less exploring a non-sectarian religious or spiritual theme.

== Winners ==
- 2008: Mark Tredinnick – "Have You Seen"
- 2009: John Watson – "Four Ways to Approach the Numinous"
- 2010: Tasha Sudan – "Rahula"
- 2011: Robert Adamson – "Via Negativa, The Divine Dark"
- 2012: Graham Kershaw – "Altar Rock"
- 2013: Anthony Lawrence – "Appellations"
- 2014: Dave Drayton – "Threnodials"
- 2017: Julie Watts – "The Story of Julian who never knew that we loved him"
- 2020: Judith Nangala Crispin – "On Finding Charlotte in the Anthropological Record"
- 2022: Simone King – "Surging Again"
- 2024: Coco X. Huang, "Three Lessons"
