= Jean Kent (poet) =

Australian poet (born 1951)

- Born: 1951 (age 74–75); Chinchilla, Queensland
- Occupation: Poet
- Known for: Poetry
- Website: jeankent.net.au

Jean Kent (born 1951) is an Australian poet.

== Education ==
Jean Kent was educated at the Glennie Memorial School in Toowoomba and graduated from University of Queensland with Bachelor of Arts majoring in psychology. She has worked in vocational guidance, educational guidance of disabled children, counselling of students and staff in TAFE colleges and, most recently, teaching creative writing. Jean now lives on Lake Macquarie, which is a feature in her verse, as well the memories and experiences formed in youth and childhood in South East Queensland.

== Literary career ==
Jean Kent has published stories in many of Australia's quality literary magazines such as Overland, Westerly, Outrider, Imago, Australian Short Stories and Meanjin as well as in the American-based Antiopodes. She has published ten poetry collections. Travelling with the Wrong Phrasebooks included poems about her travels in Paris and Lithuania. The Hour of Silvered Mullet contemplates her rural past and lakeside present and was published by Pitt Street Poetry in 2015. As was her latest Paris Light a personal Plan de Paris featuring paintings by her husband Martin Kent. Jean Kent has received several writing grants from the Australia Council, including Overseas Residencies in Paris in 1994 and 2011.

== Critical reaction ==
Martin Duwell writing in Australian Poetry Review described Travelling with the Wrong Phrasebooks as "an immensely likable collection, so likable that readers may miss some of its sophistication, thinking it no more than a set of poems about travels in France and Lithuania. It is actually a good deal more than that."

== Awards ==
- Newcastle Poetry Prize, Local Award (2023)
- Newcastle Poetry Prize, Local Award (2015)
- Dorothy Porter Prize (2009)
- Newcastle Poetry Prize, Local Award (2008)
- Somerset Poetry Prize (2003)
- Josephine Ulrick National Poetry Prize (1999)
- Wesley Michel Wright Prize for Poetry (1998)
- Newcastle Poetry Prize, 2nd prize (1997)
- the Association for the Study of Australian Literature's Mary Gilmore Award (1991)
- FAW Anne Elder Poetry Award (1990)
- Henry Kendall Poetry Competition (1988 and 1989)
- the National Library Poetry Competition (1988)

== Works ==
- Verandahs (Hale and Iremonger, 1990; republished by Picaro Press, 2009),
- Practising Breathing (Hale and Iremonger, 1991),
- The Satin Bowerbird (Hale and Iremonger, 1998)
- The Spaghetti Maker, a chapbook of selected poems, was published by Picaro Press in 2002
- Travelling with the Wrong Phrasebooks (Pitt Street Poetry, 2012)
- The Language of Light (Association of Stories in Macao and Cerberus Press, 2013)
- The Hour of Silvered Mullet (Pitt Street Poetry, 2015)
- Paris in my pocket (Pitt Street Poetry, 2016)
- The Shadow Box (Pitt Street Poetry, 2023)
- Paris Light a personal Plan de Paris (Pitt Street Poetry, 2024)

== See also ==
- List of Australian poets
