= Bruce Dawe National Poetry Prize =

- Description: Award for an original, unpublished poem by an Australian poet
- Country: Australia
- Presented by: University of Southern Queensland (UniSQ)
- Reward: $2500
- Website: www.unisq.edu.au/bruce-dawe-prize

The Bruce Dawe National Poetry Prize is an annual poetry prize endowed by Australian poet Bruce Dawe in 1999. It is awarded to "an original, unpublished poem not exceeding 50 lines" by an Australian citizen or resident. The award comes with a $2500 cash prize.

The aim of the prize is to encourage Australian poets and recognise "the important contribution they make to Australian culture". It is managed by the Faculty of Arts at the University of Southern Queensland in Toowoomba and is judged by English Literature staff at the Faculty.

== Background ==
In 2003, Bruce Dawe said that when he retired from teaching at the University of Southern Queensland, he wanted to show his appreciation of the opportunities he'd had while working there. He said:

As Epictetus said, life is only loaned to us. All we can ever hope to do, I believe, is try and keep up the interest payments on that capital loan. Prizes have always been an encouragement to me, on the odd occasion of receiving one, to keep on writing. They are one form of recognition, and writers, in this country, need all the encouragement they can get. I have always readily acknowledged the help of those friends who have been good critics and good friends. They have been a most profitable part of the loan which life has provided. Prizes, like such friends, can be the kindly nudge in the ribs we writers need. Everybody needs kindly nudges from time to time...

A firm believer in keeping the environment, Dawe also accepted an award from the Australian Environmental Minister. The words he left with the audience were inspirationally captivating: "We generate our own environment. We get exactly what we deserve. Who’s to blame, who’s to credit but us? Who can change it, anytime we wish, but us?"

He is also reported as having said that universities should encourage the practice of the arts within Australian society.

== Winners ==
- 2025: Louise Nicholas for "Between the Sheets"
- 2021: Paul Hetherington
- 2020: Alicia Sometimes
- 2019: John Watson
- 2018: Natalie D-Napoleon for "First Blood: A Sestina"
- 2017: Tim Collins for "Stage Whispers"
- 2016: Jenny Pollak for "497 Small Disappointments"
- 2015: Steve Armstrong for "A Cracked & Weathered Prayer"
- 2014: Sarah Rice for "Last week"
- 2013: Roger Vickery for "Competition"
- 2012: John Watson for "Leaving No Wake"
- 2011: Lisa Jacobson for "Several Ways to Fall Out of the Sky"
- 2010: Ray Liversidge for "The Lawn"
- 2009: Andrew Slattery for "Black Bat Burn"
- 2008: John Kinsella for "Vixerunt"
- 2007: Louise Oxley for "After the Diagnosis"
- 2006: Kate Middleton for "Minotaura: Rainbow's End"
- 2005: Jane Williams for "My Mother's Travel Diary"
- 2004: Louise Oxley for "Fitting"
- 2003: David Musgrave for "Minneapolis"
- 2002: Brook Emery for "final belief"
- 2001: Judy Johnson for "my dressmaking aunt"
- 2000: David Kirkby for "Lajamanu morning"
- 1999: Juliet Lamont for "The Players"
