= Mike Ladd (poet) =

Australian poet and radio presenter (born 1959)

Mike Ladd (born 1959) is an Australian poet and radio presenter.

Mike Ladd was born in Berkeley, California while his Australian parents were living and working in the United States, but he returned to Australia when he was one year old, and grew up in the Adelaide Hills. Ladd began writing poetry at a very young age, but took it up seriously while he was at the University of Adelaide, studying English and Philosophy. He graduated with a Bachelor of Arts in 1979. He then joined a new wave rock band called "The Lounge" as a singer and lyricist, and later travelled and worked in Europe and Africa. Returning to Australia, in 1983 he joined the Australian Broadcasting Corporation in Adelaide, working as a sound engineer and then as a producer. In 1987, he married the artist Cathy Brooks, and they have two children. Mike Ladd was the founding producer of Poetica, a weekly program of poetry broadcast on ABC Radio National. Poetica was first broadcast in February 1997 and continued until February 2015.

Influenced by the poetry of the Greek Anthology, the ancient Chinese and Japanese poets, Robert Frost, the European Minimalists and Nazim Hikmet, Ladd's poetry often combines natural elements with the suburban and industrial. He has collaborated with other artists and musicians, making poems for audio, film and installation works. He is the author of several video poems, including Seaweed, The Fall, Zoo After Dark, and The Eye of the Day.

His first book, The Crack in the Crib, focussed on childhood and suburbia. His second book, Picture's Edge, concentrated on geographical and social edges, the marginalised, and displaced. In Close to Home he celebrated the intimate joys and sorrows of family life, and in Rooms and Sequences he explored power games, politics and injustice in the wider world. Transit, published in 2007, observes key transitional moments in life as well as physical journeys.

In 2005 and 2006, Ladd worked with the NBC in Papua New Guinea, developing a radio serial in Tok Pidgin called "Kunai Strit". Funded by AusAID, the serial was designed to help fight the spread of HIV/AIDS.

In 2006, Ladd was awarded the Barbara Hanrahan fellowship and was a guest of Venezuela's World Poetry Festival.

Between the late autumn and spring of 2007, Ladd walked the River Torrens from its source to the sea, writing in his notebook as he travelled. The description of the journey was serialised in The Adelaide Review, accompanied by photographs by Cathy Brooks. Those articles, with expanded text and photographs, were published later in the book Karrawirra Parri – Walking the Torrens from Source to Sea. Karrawirra Parri, meaning "river of the red gum forests," is the official Kaurna name for the River Torrens. Taking the form of a haibun (a diary written in prose and poetry) Karrawirra Parri is a social and natural history of the river as well as a collection of personal observations along the way.

In 2009, Ladd spent three months in Malaysia, at Rimbun Dahan, where he researched and wrote poems based on the traditional "Pantum" form. The video poem he made there called The Eye of the Day won equal first prize in the Overload Festival's Poetronica award for best multimedia poem in 2010.

In 2012, he and Cathy Brooks curated and designed an installation of 30 poems on street signs, in Bowen Street Adelaide.

After the destruction of the ABC Radio Drama department in 2012, he joined the Features unit of ABC Radio National, continuing to produce Poetica with colleague Justine Sloane-Lees. When Poetica was axed in 2015, Ladd switched to making documentary series such as A Holden History, Gone Mallee and The Sands of Ooldea.

In 2022, Ladd left the ABC and he and Cathy Brooks published their collaborative book of mixed media digital images and experimental essays Dream Tetras

In 2025, Wakefield Press published his book Now-Then, New and Selected Poems, covering forty years work.

== Bibliography ==
- The crack in the crib (1984)
- Picture's Edge (1994)
- Close to Home (2000)
- Rooms and Sequences (2003)
- Shacklife (2006)
- Transit (2007)
- Karrawirra Parri – Walking the Torrens from Source to Sea (2012)
- Adelaide Poems (2014)
- Invisible Mending (2016)
- Dream Tetras (with Cathy Brooks 2022)
- Now-Then, New and Selected Poems (2025)

=== List of poems ===
Title	Year	First published	Reprinted/collected
Long-serving public servants	2014	Ladd, Mike (Autumn 2014). "Long-serving public servants". Meanjin. 73 (1): 15.	
