= Wet Ink =

Australian literary magazine

- Wet Ink issue 9
- Categories: Literature
- Frequency: Quarterly
- Founded: 2005
- First issue: December 2005
- Final issue Number: 2012; Issue #27
- Company: Wet Ink Magazine Incorporated
- Country: Australia
- Based in: Adelaide
- Language: English
- Website: Wet Ink
- ISSN: 1832-682X

Wet Ink magazine was an Australian magazine devoted to publishing new Australian writing, with an emphasis on new and emerging writers. Published quarterly, it featured fiction, poetry and creative non-fiction, plus an interview with a writer and book reviews. Work published ranged from 'literary' to genre-based work. Works were complemented by photography, illustration and clever design.

It was founded in Adelaide in 2005 by a team of writers and readers who wanted to address the lack of publishing opportunities for new writers in Australia. The first issue of the magazine appeared in December 2005. It was funded through advertising, subscriptions, sponsorship and sales. In 2012 it was announced that Wet Ink was closing down due to financial reasons with issue 27 being their last publication.

== Content ==
Wet Ink published:

• fiction
• poetry
• creative non-fiction
• opinion/commentary
• author interviews
• book reviews

== Contributors ==
Works published in the magazine by established writers include those by Thomas Shapcott, Michael Wilding, Kevin Brophy, Nigel Krauth, Ken Ruthven, Ouyang Yu, Marcelle Freiman, Nicholas Jose, Tim Sinclair and Brian Edwards.

Authors interviewed included Frank Moorhouse, Susan Johnson, Gail Jones and Tim Sinclair.

== Editorial Advisory Board ==
The Editorial Advisory Board included Thomas Shapcott, JM Coetzee, Eva Sallis, Ioana Petrescu, Nigel Krauth and Judith Rodriguez.

== Wet Ink Short Story Prize ==
In March 2010 Wet Ink announced the creation of the Wet Ink Short Story Prize to mark their five years of publication. In 2011, following funding from the Copyright Agency Ltd Cultural Fund, the value of prizes were increased and the prize renamed the Wet Ink/CAL Short Story Prize.

== See also ==
- List of literary magazines
