= Judy Johnson (writer) =

Australian writer (born 1961)

- Occupation: Poet; novelist
- Period: 1994–
- Notable awards: Wesley Michel Wright Prize, 2000, 2013

Judy Johnson (born 1961) is an Australian poet and novelist. She has won many awards, including the C. J. Dennis Prize for Poetry, the Josephine Ulrick Poetry Prize and the Wesley Michel Wright Prize (twice).

== Life ==
Johnson lives and writes in Newcastle. Her early poetry was published in 1994 and she became an established poet. In 2011 Fourth Estate published her historical novel, The Secret Fate of Mary Watson. Since then, she has written a three-part series of novels titled, The Ripper's Net in 2014–15.

== Awards and recognition ==
Johnson has won the Wesley Michel Wright Prize twice, in 2000 for Nomadic and in 2013 for Stone Scar Air Water. The latter was also shortlisted for the Poetry Award at the 2014 Western Australian Premier's Book Awards.

She won the 2001 Bruce Dawe National Poetry Prize for "My Dressmaking Aunt" and the Griffith University Josephine Ulrick Poetry Prize for "The African Spider Cures" the following year. She won the Banjo Paterson Writing Award for Open Poetry for "A Whaler's Wife at Sea" and the Henry Kendall Poetry Award for "Between the Lines" in 2004.

At the 2007 Victorian Premier's Literary Awards she won the C. J. Dennis Prize for Poetry for her verse novel, Jack.

Her book, Dark Convicts, was shortlisted for the Multicultural Award at the 2018 NSW Premier's Literary Awards.

== Works ==
=== Poetry ===
- Johnson, Judy (1998). Wing Corrections. Wollongong, NSW: Five Miles Press. ISBN 0864185073.
- —— (2004). Nomadic. North Fitzroy, Vic: Black Pepper. ISBN 978-1-876044-43-5.
- —— (2007). Navigation. Parkville, Vic: Five Islands Press. ISBN 978-0-7340-3756-5.
- —— (2008). Jack. Sydney, NSW: Picador. ISBN 9780330424226. (verse novel)
- —— (2013). Stone Scar Air Water. North Hobart, Tasmania: Walleah Press. ISBN 978-1-877010-32-3.
- —— (2013). Exhibit. Flying Islands Books. ISBN 9789996542626.
- —— (2017). Dark Convicts: ex-slaves on the First Fleet. UWAP poetry series. Crawley, Western Australia: UWA Publishing. ISBN 978-1-74258-918-3.

=== Fiction ===
- Johnson, Judy (2011). The Secret Fate of Mary Watson. Sydney New York: Fourth Estate. ISBN 978-0-7322-9250-8.
- The Ripper's Net series
  - Johnson, Judy (2014). The Lure. Sydney, NSW: Xoum. ISBN 9781921134364.
  - —— (2014). The Chase. Sydney, NSW: Xoum. ISBN 9781921134371.
  - —— (2015). The Trap. Sydney, NSW: Xoum. ISBN 9781921134388.
