= Kate Rew =

English journalist and author

(Anna) Kate Rew (born 11 September 1969) is a swimmer, author, journalist and founder of The Outdoor Swimming Society. Rew lives in Somerset.

== Early life ==
Kate Rew was born in Devon, England, where she spent much time swimming in the River Culm. She attended the University of Oxford.

== Career & Achievements ==
Kate Rew is best known as a pioneer of the outdoor swimming movement in the United Kingdom. She founded The Outdoor Swimming Society (OSS) in 2006, an organisation dedicated to promoting and supporting outdoor swimming in natural waters. Under her leadership, the OSS has grown to become a significant community, inspiring hundreds of thousands to take up outdoor swimming around the world.

Rew is also an accomplished author and journalist. Her first book, "Wild Swim" (Faber), published in 2008, combined personal anecdotes, practical advice, and original photography to celebrate the joys and challenges of swimming in natural waters. The book was praised for its inspirational content and its role in popularising wild swimming, and became a bestseller. Her second book, "The Outdoor Swimmers' Handbook' (Rider, 2022), brought together art, sport and science to teach readers everything they may need to enjoy swims in any water body.

In addition to her book, Kate has written numerous articles for prominent publications, as well as featuring on TV, radio and blogs, sharing her insights and experiences related to outdoor swimming and the natural environment. Her writing often emphasizes the physical and mental health benefits of swimming in natural settings, as well as the sense of adventure and connection to nature it provides.

== Legacy and Recognition ==
In 2009 the news and lifestyle periodical Monocle magazine named her as one of its 20 "global heroes who deserve a bigger stage worldwide". In 2016 she received the Paragon Award from the International Swimming Hall of Fame in California, America for her 'stalwart contributions' to recreational swimming.

Event Director & Charity Fundraiser Rew launched the first mass market open water swim in the UK in 2006, a charity swim called Breaststrokes in Windermere which raised money for Cancer Research UK. Breastrokes ran in Windermere and in Serpentine in 2006 and 2007, raising over £250k for the charity, which Rew had a loyalty to as a result of her mother's experiences of breast cancer.

She went on to found and run some of Britain's most iconic swim events the Dart10k (2009), The Bantham Swoosh and the Hurly Burly. She began a partnership with charity Level Water, which offers swimming lessons to children with disabilities, in 2016, and the events raised millions for the charity before being taken on by them in 2022. She continues to support the charity through The OSS, saying 'The OSS is proud of our substantial and longstanding role in helping this charity level things up, kickstarting a love of swimming in disabled children who might otherwise not have access to it'.

Through The OSS and events she has also mobilised swimmers in support of Surfers Against Sewage and Project Seagrass.

Right to Swim & Community Advocate Rew champions the everyday swimmer in her work. She has written and appeared in short films such as Chasing The Sublime to share her philosophy that 'there is always fear on a swim, of discomfort and risk' but that it is through this the sublime is reached. Chasing The Sublime appeared on Oprah Winfrey's SuperSoul Sunday.

In the UK, Rew has been vocal on the need for a greater legal access to reservoirs and other bodies of water through her work on 'Right to Swim', and together with the OSS Inland Access Group and Sheffield Outdoor Plungers (SOUP), she started a Kinder Swim Trespass in 2021 which has grown into an annual and now nationwide fixture.

With a view to making swimming more accessible in urban environments worldwide, she is a founding partner of the Swimmable Cities network.

== Books ==
- Rew, K. (2008). Wild Swim: River, Lake, Lido and Sea: The Best Places to Swim Outdoors in Britain. Guardian Books, London. ISBN 978-0-85265-093-6.
- Rew, K (2022). The Outdoor Swimmer's Handbook: Collected Wisdom on the Art, Sport and Science of Outdoor Swimming. ISBN 978-1-84604-728-2
