= Paradise Lost: Shadows and Wings =

2003 musical/opera by Eric Whitacre

Paradise Lost: Shadows and Wings is a musical theatre work with music by American composer Eric Whitacre, lyrics by Whitacre and David Norona, and book by poet Edward Esch, set in two acts. The music combines styles of opera, musical theatre, cinematic music, as well as electronic music techniques of trance music, ambient music, and techno to portray the story of an abandoned tribe of angels in search of their wings, loosely based on John Milton's epic poem Paradise Lost. Although it has various non-classical influences, it is meant to be performed by singers with operatic or musical theatre backgrounds.

== Roles ==
Roles, voice types, premiere cast
Role	Voice type	Staged premiere cast, Pasadena: July 28, 2007
Exstasis	soprano	Hila Plitmann
Logos	baritone	Dan Callaway
Fervio	tenor	Daniel Tatar
Gravitas	bass	Rodolfo Nieto
Ignis	tenor	Kevin Odekirk
Aia	soprano	Marie M. Wallace
Pieta	soprano	Juli Robbins
Caurus		Seth Barnett
Aura		Annie Abrans
Famelicus		Brad Culver
Arete		Jason Currie
Mollis		Ryan Cusino
Solaris		Jessica Harwood
Cantoris		Lena Gwendolyn Hill
Callida		Emily Kosloski
Octavius		Eddie Lopez
Lucius		Jordan T. Ogron
Pura		Katharine Terray
Aia		Marie M. Wallace
Terra		Melissa Wolfklain

== Synopsis ==
The musical begins with a prologue set years before. The angels of light leave their children behind a rock wall in preparation for the battle with the forces of darkness. The children are left without wings, which leaves them unarmed and mortal, until the war has ended. The angels of light promise to return soon, with wings and to bring the children home.

Seventeen years later, the angels of light still have not returned. Logos and his henchman, Ignis, two of the many angel children who were left long ago, are creating a powerful army by engaging the tribe in nightly combats. This vigorous training is conducted because of Logos's belief of a darkness beyond the wall.

Logos's restless lover, Exstasis, experiences flashbacks of the night when the parents left the children. While her visions and memories are helping her better realize the true events of that life-changing night, Exstasis believes that there is a better world outside of the prison where they reside. This captivity causes Exstasis to question if staying behind the rock, wingless, and preparing for war is the best life to live. Her faith in a better world compels her to begin a journey in search for the hidden wings in order to return home.

During the musical Logos and Ignis are tempted with the idea of power, while Fervio and Gravitas provide comic relief as a troublemaking loner and a thief while progressing the plot. Throughout, the largest struggle is the tribe constantly contemplating if it is worth breaking through the rock barrier to face the unknown, good or bad.

The audience and the characters are held in suspense until the end. Ultimately, the tribe breaks through the wall and experiences a musical and emotional victory.

== Performance history ==
The music of Paradise Lost was premiered in Berlin, Germany, in the summer of 2003, and a year later the opera debuted at California State University, Northridge.

On February 11, 2003, Paradise Lost was performed in concert at the Angel Orensanz Foundation on the Lower East Side of Manhattan. This concert featured the Duquesne University Concert Choir as the background "Choir of Angels". This concert featured soprano Hila Plitmann as Exstasis, baritone Damon Kirsche as Logos, and David Norona as narrator.

The show premiered in a concert performance at Northwestern University including students from the University's American Music Theatre Project (AMTP) on February 11 and 12, 2006, conducted by Whitacre during his 12-day residency. The performances featured soprano Hila Plitmann, guest baritone Damon Kirsche, guest tenor Omar Gutierrez Crook, Northwestern University's Contemporary Music Ensemble, and student soloists.

On July 28, 2007, the work had its world premiere in Pasadena, California, at the Theatre at Boston Court and closed on September 2, 2007.

On June 15, 2010, Distinguished Concerts International New York presented a concert version of the show at Carnegie Hall in New York. The show featured many of the musicians from the world premiere, including soloists Hila Plitmann, Damon Kirsche, Sara Jean Ford, Doug Kreeger, Rodolfo Nieto, Marie Wallace, and Daniel Tatar; and DJ Greg Chun. The Carnegie Hall production also featured a 425-voice Chorus of Angels drawn from the United States, Germany, Canada, and the Enchiriadis Chamber Choir from Ireland.

== Asian influences ==
The opera has many Asian influences. The prologue and all past sequences (Exstasis's dreams and vision) are told through anime, projected onto the set. Other Asian influences include live taiko drumming, martial arts, and a kuroko-style ensemble.

== Awards and nominations ==
Paradise Lost received ten LA Stage Alliance Ovation Awards nominations, including Costume Design in an Intimate Theater: Soojin Lee; Sound Design in an Intimate Theater: Martin Carrillo; Lighting Design in an Intimate Theatre: Steven Young; and World Premier Musical, and Musical in an Intimate Theater. Martin Carrillo and Steven Young both received the Ovation Award for their designs in the Intimate Theater category. Additionally, Steven Young, and Martin Carrillo were both awarded the 2008 Los Angeles Back Stage Garland Awards for Lighting Design and Sound Design respectively. The LA Weekly Theater Award for lighting design was also given to Steven Young for the 2007 Pasadena production.

== Musical numbers ==
=== Act 1 ===
- Prologue (The Oracle, Chorus of Angels)
- Children of Paradise (Exstasis, Logos, Ignis, Chorus of Angels)
- "Forgotten" – Exstasis, Logos
- "Exstasis Drinks the Amber" – Exstasis
- "This is the Way" – Logos, Ignis, Pura, company
- "What If" – Exstasis, Pieta, Fervio, Aia, Gravitas
- "The Principles" – Logos, Exstasis, company
- "Eldest of All" – Logos
- "You Don't Know Him" – Exstasis, Pieta, Fervio, Aia, Gravitas
- Act 1 Finale – Logos, Fervio, Exstasis, company

=== Act 2 ===
- Little One (Ignis)
- Libertas Imperio (Logos, Ignis, Chorus of Angels)
- Sleep my Child (Exstasis, Pieta, Aia)
- Close Your Eyes (Exstasis, Exstasis's Mother, Chorus of Angels)
- All Alone (Fervio)
- Little One—Reprise (Ignis, Chorus of Angels)
- Forgotten—Reprise (Exstasis, Logos)
- The Choice (Chorus of Angels)
- The Rage (Exstasis, Chorus of Angels)
- The Battle (Chorus of Angels)
- Fly to Paradise/Bliss (full cast)
- Bows (full cast)

== Evolution ==
The story, characters, and music of Paradise Lost have evolved greatly from inception to present day.

February 11, 2003: Every morning, Extasis would read from the Book of Light to the other angels, retelling the story of Creation in the multi-movement piece Genesis. A God-like character was referenced but never seen, the omniscient "One". Her brother Logos is charged with keeping order amongst the angels, and does so through routine and discipline. He sings the "This Is the Way" aria. Extasis is free-willed and passionate, and defies her brother Logos, who banishes her and her horse to the wilderness. Here she sings the "Butterflies" aria, which includes a high F♯, Whitacre's wink at The Magic Flute. Inspired and incensed, Extasis raises an army of angels and leads them back to Paradise for "War". In the culminating battle, Logos accidentally stabs Extasis, and she dies in his arms. At one point in the story, the Choir of Angels performed a version of Lux Aurumque with modified lyrics.

The Carnegie Hall performance on June 15, 2010, included a greatly altered story (Logos and Extasis are now lovers, not brother and sister, more choral singing, and was produced as a one-act concert).
