= Sunrisers =

Sunrisers may refer to:

- Sunrisers Hyderabad, a cricket team in the Indian Premier League
- Sunrisers Eastern Cape, a cricket team in South Africa, affiliated with Sunrisers Hyderabad
- Sunrisers Leeds, a cricket team based in Leeds, England; affiliated with Sunrisers Hyderabad
- Sunrisers (women's cricket), a cricket team in England
- Sunrisers Drum and Bugle Corps, a Drum and Bugle Corps in Long Island, New York

== See also ==
- Sylhet Sunrisers, a cricket team in Bangladesh (now renamed Sylhet Strikers)
