= The Sacred Veil =

2018 composition by Eric Whitacre

The Sacred Veil is a composition for choir, piano and cello by Eric Whitacre, with lyrics by Charles Anthony Silvestri. He composed it in 2018, also including lyrics of Silvestri's wife Julie, who died of cancer and to whom the composition is dedicated. A 2022 arrangement for choir and string orchestra has been premiered, but remains unpublished to date.

== Performances ==
The work was first performed in February 2019 at the Walt Disney Concert Hall conducted by Whitacre. Other performances in the US include the Cleveland Orchestra Chorus, performing the piece in October 2023.

The European and British premiere took place in July 2019 in London.

The first performances in Australia and New Zealand were in September 2022 at the Sydney Opera House, after a two-year postponement due to the COVID pandemic, and at the Holy Trinity Cathedral, Auckland.

More European performances include the Austrian premiere in January 2022 in Vienna and the Dutch premiere, which, after being postponed from March 2020, took place in February 2023 at the Concertgebouw, Amsterdam, conducted by Whitacre. The German premiere took place at the Stadtkirche Darmstadt in December 2023.

The Latin American premiere took place in May 2023 in Antigua Guatemala, with Silvestri being present as a special guest. In July 2023, the work received its Danish premiere in July 2023 in Aarhus. The first performance in Spain took place in September 2023 at the Palau de la Música Catalana in Barcelona.

A 2022 performance by Voces8 is featured on the 2023 album Home.

The Swiss premiere took place in September 2025 in a four-concert series featuring Whitacre as conductor and Silvestri as presenter. The premiere (and Whitacre's debut) in Liechtenstein was also part of the series.

The Finnish premiere took place in October 2026 at Kangasala-talo in Kangasala, performed by Chamber Choir Näsi.
