= Water Night =

Water Night is one of composer Eric Whitacre's earliest works, written in 1995 during his attendance at University of Nevada, Las Vegas, and commissioned by the Dale Warland Singers. It is written for SATB choir a cappella with three, four and five-part divisi in vocal sections. The text is from Octavio Paz's poem Agua nocturna, adapted by Whitacre and translated by Muriel Rukeyser. According to Whitacre, "[t]he music sounded in the air" as he read the poem. Whitacre dedicated this composition to his friend Dr. Bruce Mayhall.

== Description ==
The piece begins on a standard B♭ minor triad with a hovering third in the soprano line. As the first five measures progress, a subtle chord progression plays upon this tonic chord, consisting of ninth and eleventh chords, yet still maintaining the B♭_{3} pedal point. This use of tonic beneath moving dissonance paints an initial sensation of darkness and irregularity, and is maintained an octave lower in measures 6–15. Whitacre then immediately shifts the established current with a subito forte entrance by the women on a B♭ minor triad, echoed by the men two beats into the measure. The men and women continue the "call-and-response" tonic-beneath-dissonance progression as it modulates downward. Measures 25–26 echo the irregular opening in "silence and solitude," and 26–27 feature a melodically-absent duet between the soprano and alto consisting of minor seconds and perfect fourths.

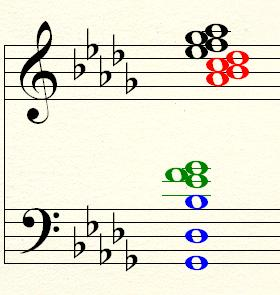
Figure 1: 14-part divisi chord on "eyes."

In measures 28–52, Whitacre draws the listener by invitation on a crescendo to "drink in [...] eyes [...and] waters", until one can finally "open your eyes". In the single climax chord of "eyes", divided sopranos, altos and tenors sing a tone cluster filling in all diatonic notes between A♭_{5} and E♭_{4}, while the basses support with the submediant, a G-flat major chord (see Figure 1).

This gradually deflates to measure 41, back to the "night", the chord composed of another A♭ mixolydian scale and the bass on supertonic of the relative major.

Measure 42 relays the most notable melodic line, with a D♭_{5} down to C_{5} to A♭_{4} and up to B♭_{4}, a common melodic sequence used in more popular music, such as in the pieces "Starlight Sequence" from Andrew Lloyd Webber's Starlight Express and "Once Upon A Dream" from Frank Wildhorn's Jekyll and Hyde.

In measures 47–48, Whitacre musically paints the text, "fills you from within", by starting the basses on an E♭_{3} and the sopranos on a D♭_{4}, with the choir gradually filling every note between the two, literally filling from within.

Finally, the piece collapses to the opening's tonic/dissonant play, as the final chord rings out the echoed B♭ minor tonic chord.

== Virtual Choir 3 ==
This composition was used for Whitacre's Virtual Choir 3.
