= Charles Anthony Silvestri =

American lyricist, poet, historian (born 1965)

- Born: 1965 (age 60–61); Las Vegas, Nevada
- Education: Loyola Marymount University (BA); University of Southern California (PhD)
- Occupations: Poet, lyricist, historian
- Writing career
- Language: English
- Subject: Medieval European history
- Notable work: Sleep (2000)
- Website: www.charlesanthonysilvestri.com

Charles Anthony "Tony" Silvestri (born 1965) is an American poet and lyricist, and a lecturer in history at Washburn University.

== Early life and education ==
Silvestri was born in Las Vegas in 1965. He studied ancient and medieval history at Loyola Marymount University and has a PhD from the University of Southern California, where his doctoral dissertation was a critical edition of some of the writing of medieval English theologian William of Ware.

== Lyrics and poetry ==
He has provided lyrics for several works by choral composer Eric Whitacre. In 2000, he translated into Latin a short poem attributed to Edward Esch, to form the words of Whitacre's Lux Aurumque. Also in 2000, Whitacre had written music to the words of Robert Frost's poem "Stopping by Woods on a Snowy Evening" and had been "crushed" when the copyright owners forbade this use. He commissioned Silvestri to write new words for the music, which he described as "an enormous task, because I was asking him to not only write a poem that had the exact structure of the Frost, but that would even incorporate key words from "Stopping", like 'sleep'". This work, Sleep, was sung by the second iteration of Whitacre's Virtual Choir, has been widely performed, and has been used by grief counselors, especially those working with bereaved children and in conjunction with artist Anne Horjus's 2013 picture-book edition.

Silvestri's wife Julie died from ovarian cancer in 2005 aged 36. A group of poems he wrote about their relationship, her death, and his grief, together with three poems by her and two by Whitacre, form the words of Whitacre's 2018 The Sacred Veil.

Silvestri wrote the libretto for Whitacre's 2001 Leonardo Dreams of his Flying Machine, based on extracts from Leonardo's notebooks. This too was published as a picture-book with illustrations by Anne Horjus.

Silvestri has also worked with Norwegian composer Ola Gjeilo, writing lyrics for his works including Dreamweaver (based on Draumkvedet), Tundra, and Across the Vast Eternal Sky.

In 2019, Silvestri published A Silver Thread, a collection of his poetry written over 20 years.

== Selected publications ==
- Silvestri, Charles Anthony (2019). A Silver Thread : the Lyric Poetry of Charles Anthony Silvestri. Chicago: GIA. ISBN 978-1622773541.
- Silvestri, Charles Anthony; Horjus, Anne (2013). Sleep. Lawrence, KS: Acroterion Books. ISBN 978-1480354029.
- Silvestri, Charles Anthony; Horjus, Anne (2020). Leonardo dreams of his flying machine. Lawrence, KS: Acroterion. ISBN 9781540068804.
