= Stopping by Woods on a Snowy Evening =

1923 poem by Robert Lee Frost

- by Robert Lee Frost
- Written: June 1922
- First published in: New Hampshire
- Meter: iambic tetrameter
- Rhyme scheme: AABA BBCB CCDC DDDD
- Publication date: 1923

Full text
- Stopping by Woods on a Snowy Evening at Wikisource

Stopping by Woods on a Snowy Evening

Whose woods these are I think I know.
His house is in the village though;
He will not see me stopping here
To watch his woods fill up with snow.

My little horse must think it queer
To stop without a farmhouse near
Between the woods and frozen lake
The darkest evening of the year.

He gives his harness bells a shake
To ask if there is some mistake.
The only other sound's the sweep
Of easy wind and downy flake.

The woods are lovely, dark and deep,
But I have promises to keep,
And miles to go before I sleep,
And miles to go before I sleep.

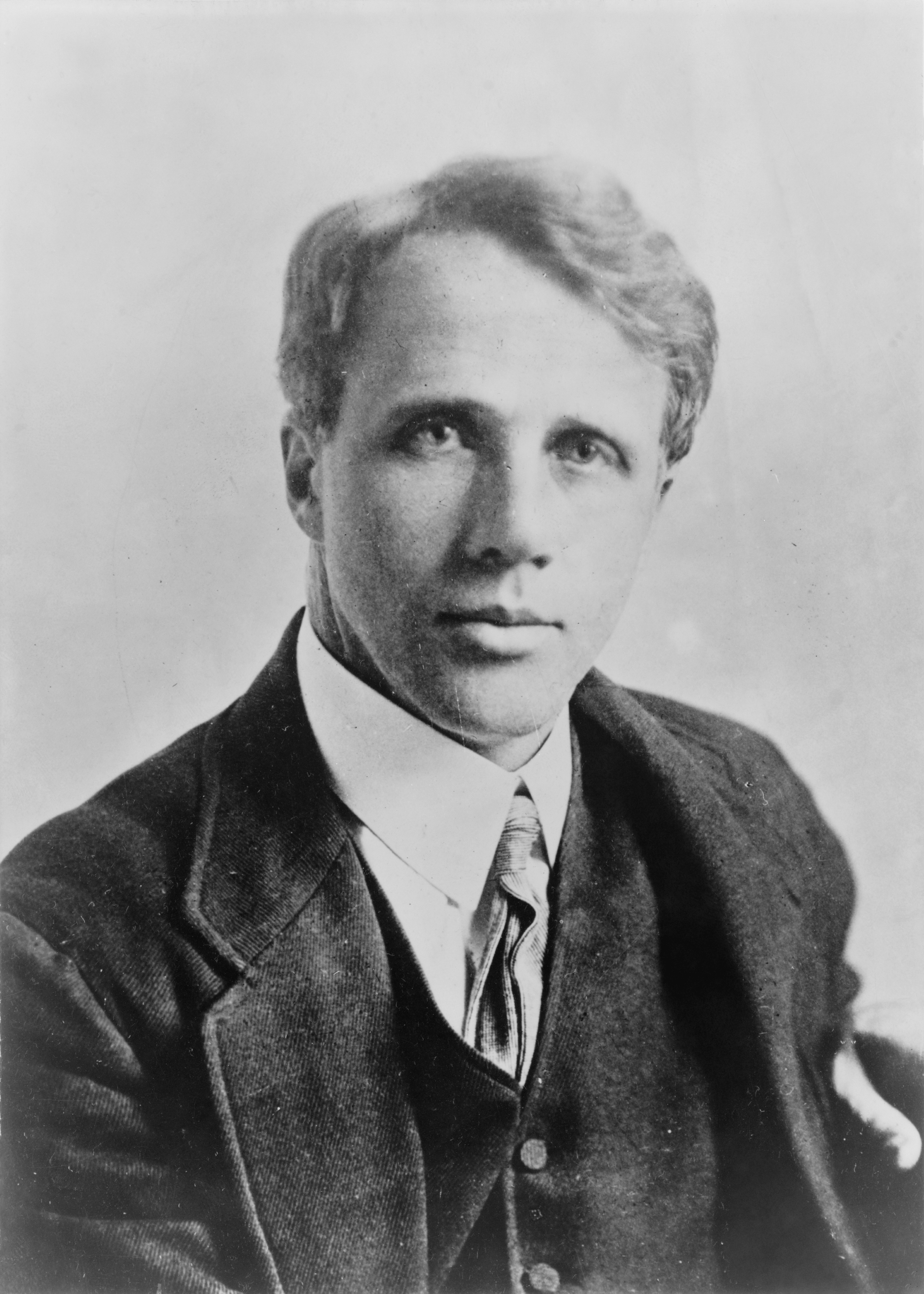
Robert Frost

"Stopping by Woods on a Snowy Evening" is a narrative poem by American poet Robert Frost, composed in 1922 and first published in 1923 in his collection New Hampshire. The poem depicts a lone rider halting his horse-drawn sleigh at the edge of a dark, snow-covered woodland on the eve of winter, mesmerized by the scene's beauty, only to be reminded by the horse's impatience and his own obligations that he must continue his journey, culminating in the repeated refrain of "miles to go before I sleep." Imagery, personification, and repetition are prominent in Frost's work and seamlessly blend together to create a strong foundation for his later claim in a letter to Louis Untermeyer, in which Frost called it "my best bid for remembrance".

== Background ==
Frost wrote the poem in June 1922 at his house in Shaftsbury, Vermont. He had been up the entire night writing the long poem "New Hampshire" from the poetry collection of the same name, and had finally finished when he realized morning had come. He went out to view the sunrise and suddenly got the idea for "Stopping by Woods on a Snowy Evening". He wrote the new poem "about the snowy evening and the little horse as if I'd had a hallucination" in just "a few minutes without strain."

== Analysis ==
In the poem “Stopping by Woods on a Snowy Evening”, Robert Frost uses metaphor as an instrument of order in the chaos, in this poem we see the thoughts of a lone narrator as his carriage stops in the woods during the Winter Solstice, known as the darkest night of winter. The use of metaphors within his poem signify a sense of being lost to the darkness of the woods and being hypnotised by the solace of the woods. The language used to describe the woods “the woods are lovely, dark and deep” signifies that our narrator feels as though he’s in unspoken territory with the metaphorical significance in the poem also presenting the woods as a threatening and dangerous environment. The use of metaphors as a technique in his work makes the poem more mysterious and enhances the description of the woods. Metaphors throughout the poem also reinforce the enchantment our narrator feels by the woods, while also demonstrating a feeling of trespassing or a lack of belonging. The phrase “the woods are lovely, dark and deep” could be taken literally, meaning to simply express joy in experiencing nature, but take on greater meaning when considered to be metaphorical. Metaphorically, the poem could represent happiness especially in the smaller moments, especially when considering the line: “I have promises to keep, and miles to go before I sleep”. This line contrasts the buildup of a quiet and enjoyable scene by reminding the narrator of his obligations, with sleep perhaps representing his mortality.

=== Structure and style ===
The poem is written in Iambic tetrameter which is a meter that has four iambs per line, with this technique each iamb is made of an unstressed then a stressed syllable.It has become one of the most beloved and widely used meters in English poetry and has supported writing from ancient ballads to modern verse. The poem also has the use of a technique known as the Rubaiyat stanza, a technique first used in 1940 with the rhyming scheme AABA, this was a technique discovered by Edward Fitzgerald to use in this poem “Stopping by Woods on a Snowy Evening.” He adopted this style from Hakim Omar Khayyam, a twelfth century Persian poet and mathematician. The use of Iambic tetrameter works for this poem as the four beats per line reflects the steady gallop of a horse’s hooves but also a hypnotic pace that mimics the rhythm of travel. The technique also personifies the horse as an externalised social conscience.With the poem we are never given a conclusion as to what the speaker decided to do. The rhyming scheme of this poem especially in the last verse the rhyming scheme changes but with the final line being repeated, this reflects emotional deepening through ambiguity and serves as a formal resolution to the rhyme pattern being used in the poem.

The poem begins with a moment of quiet introspection, which is reflected in the soft sounds of w's and th's, as well as double ll's. In the second stanza, harder sounds — like k and qu — begin to break the whisper. As the narrator's thought is disrupted by the horse in the third stanza, a hard g is used.

== Usage ==
=== In politics ===
In the early morning of November 23, 1963, Sid Davis of Westinghouse Broadcasting reported on the arrival of President John F. Kennedy's casket at the White House. Since Frost was one of the President's favorite poets, Davis concluded his report with a passage from this poem, being overcome with emotion as he signed off.

At the funeral of former Canadian prime minister Pierre Trudeau, on October 3, 2000, his eldest son, Justin, rephrased the last stanza of this poem in his eulogy: "The woods are lovely, dark and deep. He has kept his promises and earned his sleep."

Frost's poem, and specifically its last stanza, was featured prominently in U.S. President Joe Biden's 2008 autobiography Promises to Keep, the name of which is derived from the poem's third-from-last line.

=== Adaptations ===
The poem was set to music by Randall Thompson as part of Frostiana.

The American composer Eric Whitacre first set this poem to music in 2000; due to a legal dispute with the Frost estate over the use of the poem, he engaged his friend, poet Charles Silvestri, to write alternative lyrics. The result was Sleep, one of their most celebrated collaborations. In January 2019 the Frost poem entered the public domain, finally allowing Whitacre to perform the piece as it was originally composed.

=== Modern media ===
The poem inspired the song 'The Woods' by San Fermin, as seen in the lyrics and rhyme scheme.

The last stanza of the poem is used as a plot device in the 1977 spy film Telefon. The words are used as a spoken code phrase that activates brainwashed Soviet sleeper agents in the United States and makes them carry out acts of sabotage.

The last stanza of the poem is used as a plot device in Quentin Tarantino's 2007 film Death Proof.

The poem and poet are very likely referenced in Babylon's Ashes, the sixth book in the main sequence of James S. A. Corey's Expanse series when a character who is an ageing political figure is described contemplating the burden of leadership and his accompanying sleep deprivation.
