= Cloudburst (Whitacre) =

Composition by Eric Whitacre

Cloudburst is a composition by Eric Whitacre for eight-part choir, with piano and percussion accompaniment. Whitacre began writing the piece in 1991 (when the composer was 21), at the request of conductor Dr. Jocelyn K. Jensen for her high school choir - the final version of the piece was published in 1995. The text was adapted from Octavio Paz's poem El cántaro roto (The Broken Water-Jar), and inspired by the experience of the composer witnessing a desert cloudburst.

The first section is a cappella, notable for its dissonant tone clusters. Whitacre notates long, sustained notes with text to be spoken at random by each individual singer. Following the opening section is a baritone solo, which is then followed by the development of a new a cappella theme. This section continues into a spoken, arrhythmic incantatory solo with background.

In the section titled "The Cloudburst", handbells (which are directed to be hidden from the audience) play a written two bars, and then play at random as the choir crescendos into an aleatoric section, which is signaled by a loud clap of "thunder". During this time, the choir begins claps, snaps, and thigh smacks in order to imitate the sound of rain. A thunder sheet, bass drum, handbells, suspended cymbal, wind chimes, and piano contribute to the effect of a thunderstorm. The storm gradually builds then fades, and the ending of the piece mirrors the beginning section, with the choir arpeggiating as the piano voices block chords.

"Cloudburst" was the title feature of an album by Stephen Layton's chamber choir Polyphony. The album included other works by Whitacre and was nominated for the 2007 Grammy Award in best Choral Performance.

A concert band version, commissioned for the Indiana All-State Band, was released by Whitacre in 2001.
