= October (Whitacre) =

2000 contemporary piece for concert band written by Eric Whitacre

- for Concert Band by Eric Whitacre
- Catalogue: UPC 073999309911
- Year: 1998; 28 years ago
- Related: https://ericwhitacre.com/music-catalog/alleluia
- Occasion: Nebraska Wind Consortium
- Commissioned by: Brian Anderson
- Based on: Autumn
- Performed: Eric Whitacre Conducts:Live from Tokyo!, October (Nottingham Symphonic Winds)
- Publisher: Boosey & Hawkes
- Duration: 7:30

Premiere
- Date: 8 April 2000
- Location: Crete, Nebraska, US
- Conductor: Jay Gilbert
- Performers: Doane College Band

October is a contemporary piece for concert band approximately six minutes in duration that was written by Eric Whitacre in 2000.

It has since had other arrangements written for full orchestra, string orchestra with percussion, brass ensemble, brass band, and mallet quartet.

== Background ==
In 1998, Eric Whitacre received a commission to write a seven-minute piece for the Nebraska Wind Consortium. The result was the pastoral piece October. He wrote with the intention of evoking a peaceful musical representation of the month he has called his favorite, and the feelings this autumnal month evokes for him.

Whitacre writes in a programme note:

Something about the crisp autumn air and the subtle changes in light always make me a little sentimental, and as I started to sketch I felt the same quiet beauty in the writing. The simple, pastoral melodies and the subsequent harmonies are inspired by the great English Romantics (Vaughan Williams, Edward Elgar), as I felt this style was also perfectly suited to capture the natural and pastoral soul of the season. I'm happy with the end result, especially because I feel there just isn't enough lush, beautiful music written for winds.

October was premiered on May 14, 2000, by a band composed of students from 30 Nebraska high school bands. It is dedicated to Brian Anderson, the organizer of the Nebraska Wind Consortium.

== Grading difficulty ==
October has been classified as a grade 5 wind band work (based on the guidelines as established by the authors of Teaching Music through Performance in Band) suited for mature high school through professional level ensembles.

== Instrumentation ==
The instrumentation of October is standard for most high school concert bands, with the exceptions that it requires two bass clarinets and two separate parts for both euphonium and tuba. Players can double up for the two flute parts, the three clarinet parts and the saxophone and trumpet parts. The oboe, E♭ clarinet, bass clarinet, bassoon, French horn, trombone, euphonium and tuba parts will probably each be played by just one performer. Three percussionists are required to play timpani, suspended cymbal, wind chimes, bass drum, crash cymbal, and triangle. Two of the instruments that Whitacre used, the E♭ clarinet and the bass trombone, are high school instruments, not middle school. The band should be about sixty-five members strong or a little more. This is a practical number for a high school band, although it will depend on the school district. With sixty-five players, some of them will be the only performer of their particular part.

There are thirty-three different parts:

- Flute I, II
- Oboe I, II
- Bassoon I, II
- E♭ Clarinet
- B♭ Clarinet I, II, III
- B♭ Bass Clarinet I, II
- E♭ Alto Saxophone I, II
- B♭ Tenor Saxophone
- E♭ Baritone Saxophone
- B♭ Trumpet I, II, III
- F Horn I, II, III, IV
- Tenor Trombone I, II
- Bass Trombone
- Euphonium I, II
- Tuba I, II
- Timpani
- Percussion I, II (Bass Drum, Suspended Cymbal, Crash Cymbals, Mark Tree, Triangle)

=== Instrument ranges ===
In the table, pitches are the written pitches, not the sounding pitches.

Flute	Oboe	Clarinet	Bassoon	Saxophone	French horn	Trumpet	Trombone	Euphonium	Tuba
(1) D♭_{4} – A♭_{6}	(1) D_{4} – D_{6}	(E♭) B♭_{3} – E_{6}	(1) C♯_{2} – E_{4}	(Alto 1) B_{3} – B♭_{5}	(1) A♭_{3} – F♯_{5}	(1) D_{4} – B_{5}	(1) C_{3} – E_{4}	(1) G_{2} – E_{4}	(1) G♭_{1} – D_{3}
(2) C_{4} – A♭_{6}	(2) D♭_{4} – D_{6}	(1) A♭_{3} – E_{6}	(2) C_{2} – D_{4}	(Alto 2) B_{3} – G_{5}	(2) A♭_{3} – F♯_{5}	(2) B♭_{3} – G_{5}	(2) A_{2} – E♭_{4}	(2) G_{2} – E_{4}	(2) G♭_{1} – D_{3}
		(2) G♭_{3} – B_{5}		(Tenor) E_{4} – C_{6}	(3) A♭_{3} – F♯_{5}	(3) B♭_{3} – E_{5}	(Bass) F_{2} – E_{3}		
		(3) E_{3} – B_{5}		(Bari) E_{4} – B_{5}	(4) A♭_{3} – F♯_{5}				
		(Bass 1&2) E♭_{3} – A_{5}							

== Rhythm and metric complexity ==
October is metrically complex, switching frequently between 2/4, 3/4, 4/4, 5/4 and 6/4 times. While common time (4/4) is the primary meter, many sections stay in the same metre for as little as one measure. This switching between metres is less difficult than it might be, because the division of the beat remains the same.

Most of the rhythmic patterns used in October are manageable for high school students. For the most part, the piece uses simple divisions of duple rhythms, ranging from whole notes to eighth notes. The last of these, the eighth note, dominates the first half of the piece, occurring in at least one instrument in every measure. In the second half of the piece, quarter and half notes dominate, and there is a quarter-note triplet in one measure. One particularly difficult measure toward the end of the piece has a beat incorporating a complex cross-rhythm: the low brass instrument and low woodwinds play an eighth-note triplet with sixteenth notes on the last beat; the 3rd B♭ clarinets play four sixteenth notes; the 2nd B♭ clarinets play five sixteenth notes; the oboes play six sixteenth notes; and the 1st B♭ clarinets, the E♭ clarinet and the flutes play seven sixteenth notes.

== Scoring and texture ==
October requires a substantial amount of playing from each section of the band and has many tuttis, giving students practice in blending with other instruments and in matching the timbre across the ensemble. October switches frequently between thin and thick textures. The most usual pattern is for a small group of woodwinds to play, then the whole ensemble, and then a small group of woodwinds once more. This progression will create the serene and expressive mood that Whitacre aims for and will allow individuals, as well as the ensemble, to play with emotion. October includes no less than five potential climaxes, or moments when the full band is playing forte or louder. However, there is only one true climax of the piece which doesn't occur until rehearsal I, just moments from the end.

=== Technical facility ===
The technical problems presented by October are not so much those of rhythm and speed as those that arise from the different keys, the key relationships, and the pianistic melodic line. Whitacre uses four main key signatures: D♭ major, A♭ major, B♭ major and G major.

== Form and structure ==
October has an introduction, four main themes, a short interlude and a final coda. A new theme is heard in measures 19–30: the woodwinds continue to play, and the texture builds up progressively as the brass instruments enter. After the second theme, the first theme returns briefly, this time in tutti. The clarinets and horns play an alternating rhythm, and the bassoon and the trombone create a hocket as they play the transition to the next section. The third theme, in A♭ major, is heard in measures 40–65, beginning with a passage for solo euphonium accompanied by clarinets playing tremolo, muted trumpets and stopped horns. The section grows as more instruments enter, and the phrase reaches its climax with a metric modulation. Theme three is followed by a four-bar interlude in which the oboe solo that began the piece is heard once more, but this time in B♭ major. Measures 72–89 present the fourth and final theme in the key of G major, again with the upper woodwinds playing first and then growing until all the instruments have entered. The first theme returns in measures 73–97, played by the entire ensemble. The piece concludes with a coda from measure 98 to the end (m. 113). A six-measure melodic hocket is played by the horn, trombone, euphonium and trumpets, ending with a climax in G major. October concludes with the low brass and woodwinds playing a long diminuendo into silence.

=== Melodic material ===
The main theme begins with the solo oboe playing an introductory melody (I) in D♭ major, consisting of eighth and quarter notes embellished by grace notes, and has an overlapping counter-melody played by bassoon and euphonium.

The next melody, played by all the upper woodwinds, the tenor saxophone and the horns (II), uses a variety of intervals – fourths, fifths, sevenths and an octave – making it somewhat angular.

The melody of theme two, played by the upper woodwinds, also uses eighth and quarter notes (III). The motion of this melody is more stepwise than the previous one.

The next new melody, for solo euphonium, mixes many leaps with stepwise motion and repeated notes (IV). The melody of the interlude is a restatement of the opening melody in a different key.

The final theme presents a new melody played by the flutes, clarinets and alto saxophones; it is rhythmically simpler than previous material (V).

The melody in the coda is distributed among the saxophones, trombones, euphonium, and trumpet (VI).

=== Harmonic material ===
The piece begins in D♭ major with a single held note in the 1st clarinets and gentle wind chimes underneath. The remaining clarinets join the chimes to support the oboe melody. Proceeding to the first theme, the texture becomes thicker, and the bass clarinet, bassoons, euphoniums and tubas now play the accompaniment. In theme two, the whole brass section accompanies the melody of the upper woodwinds. In the transition to theme three, the bassoons play a harmony that sets up a modulation to A♭ major. In this new key and new theme, the accompaniment returns to the clarinets, which play trills. The effect depends not so much on the notes as on the contrast between the sonority of the trills and the euphonium solo. The music modulates to B♭ major, and the bassoons, euphoniums and tubas play harmonic ostinatos. All of the brass play the harmony during the fourth theme, now in G major. In the coda, all the woodwinds play trills above the melodic brass. The piece concludes with the brass quietly playing a final G major chord.

=== Form and structure chart ===
	Introduction	Theme 1	Theme 2	Theme 3	Interlude	Theme 4	Coda
Form	Homophony	Homophony	Polyphony	Homophony-Polyphony	Monophony	Polyphony	Homophony
Measure Groupings	m. 1–9	m. 10–18; 31–39; 90–97	m. 19–30	m. 40–65	m. 66–71	m. 72–89	m. 98–113
Tonalities	D♭ major / B♭ minor	D♭ major / B♭ minor	D♭ major / B♭ minor	A♭ major / F minor	B♭ major / G minor	G major / E minor	G major / E minor
Melodic Materials	Solo oboe	Upper woodwinds, tenor sax, horns	Upper woodwinds	Solo euphonium; upper woodwinds and horns	Solo oboe	All woodwinds	Saxes, horns, trombones, euphoniums
Harmonic Materials	Clarinets	Bass clarinet, euphonium, tuba	Brass	Clarinets; trumpets and low brass	Clarinets and brass	Brass	Woodwinds
Rhythmic Material	Whole, half, quarter, eighth, ties, and grace notes	Dotted half, half, quarter, and eighth notes	Whole, dotted half, half, quarter, and eighth notes	Whole, dotted half, half, quarter, and eighth notes	Whole, quarter, and eighth notes	Mostly whole, half, and quarter notes. A few eighth notes. One quarter note triplet.	Whole, dotted half, half, and quarter notes. A few eighth notes.
Texture	1st clarinets start alone, solo oboe with all clarinets accompaniment – thin	Thicker texture – almost all instruments playing. Most playing melody, only few on harmony.	Starts thin with just upper woodwinds, becomes thick with tutti, thins out again now with brass playing	Very thin in begin. With solo and only clarinet tremolo accompaniment. Instruments begin to enter and by m. 52, everyone is playing.	Extremely thin spot with only two sections playing, yet still moves along	Thick texture with most instruments playing whole time. Longer, legato phrases	Fairly thin texture though woodwind whole notes will provide support. Melody switches between groups of brass instruments = hocket
Dynamics	Begins pianissimo; hairpins in every measure; crescendo to next section	Mezzo forte; hairpins in m. 11; small cresc. in m. 13 to forte; m. 18 decres. to mezzo piano	Mp; brass enter m. 22 at mf; cresc in m. 24 to f; hairpins throughout to f	Mf solo, mp accomp.; entrances at mf; two bar cresc. to f at m. 53	Mp solo, piano and pp accompaniment	Mp; two bar cresc. to mf in m. 78 followed by a slight decres. Hairpins throughout m. 79–84; f in m. 85; huge cresc. to fortissimo in m. 89	Fortepiano; melody at mf; accompaniment two-bar cresc. to f in m. 102; all cresc. to ff in m. 104; decres. To ending pp
