= Eric Whitacre =

American composer (born 1970)

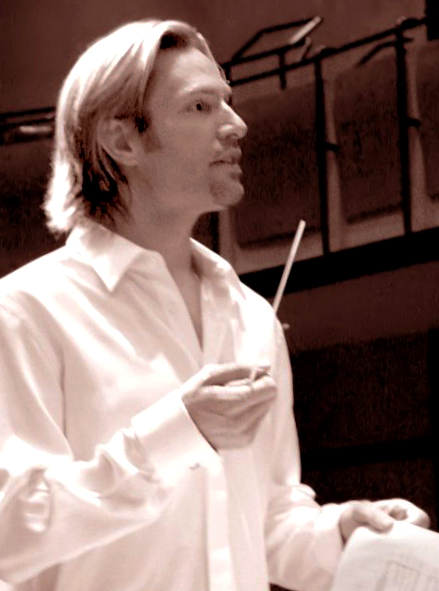
- Whitacre conducting in 2007
- Born: January 2, 1970 (age 56); Reno, Nevada, U.S.
- Education: University of Nevada, Las Vegas; Juilliard School
- Occupations: Composer, conductor, speaker
- Spouses: Hila Plitmann (m. 1998; div. 2017) Laurence Servaes (m. 2019)
- Children: 1 (with Plitmann) 1 (with Servaes, b. 2020)
- Website: ericwhitacre.com

Eric Edward Whitacre (born January 2, 1970) is an American composer, conductor, and speaker best known for his choral music.

== Early life and education ==
Whitacre was born in Reno, Nevada, to Ross and Roxanne Whitacre. He studied piano intermittently as a child and joined a junior high marching band under band leader Jim Burnett. Later Whitacre played a synthesizer in a techno-pop band, dreaming of being a rock star. Although he initially resisted joining choir while attending college, Whitacre was eventually convinced. He described his own experience with his first choral rehearsal as a turning point in his life, saying, "In my entire life I had seen in black and white, and suddenly everything was in shocking Technicolor. It was the most transformative experience I've ever had—in that single moment, hearing dissonance and harmony, and people singing...". Though he was unable to read music at the time, Whitacre began his full musical training while he was an undergraduate at the University of Nevada, Las Vegas. He eventually earned a bachelor's degree in Music Composition.

== Career ==
Whitacre studied composition with Ukrainian composer Virko Baley and choral conducting with David B. Weiller, completing his bachelor's degree in 1995. Whitacre credits Weiller with the inspiration that put the young composer on the musical path. At 21, he wrote his setting of "Go, Lovely Rose" for his college choir and presented the composition as a gift to David Weiller. Whitacre went on to earn his master's degree in composition at the Juilliard School, where he studied with John Corigliano and David Diamond. At the age of 23 he completed his first piece for wind orchestra, "Ghost Train", which has now been recorded more than 40 times. Tom Leslie contributed to his interest in writing for wind ensembles. While at Juilliard he met his future wife, soprano Hila Plitmann, and two of his closest friends, composers Steven Bryant and Jonathan Newman. He lived in Nevada until he was 25. He graduated in 1997 and moved to Los Angeles, and then decided to become a full-time professional composer following the success of Ghost Train.

Whitacre's first album as both composer and conductor on Decca Records, Light & Gold, won a Grammy Award in 2012, and became the No. 1 classical album on the US and UK charts within a week of release. Whitacre's second album, Water Night, was released on Decca in April 2012 and featured performances from his professional choir the Eric Whitacre Singers, the London Symphony Orchestra, Julian Lloyd Webber and Hila Plitmann.

Around January 25, 2011, Whitacre began working with film composer Hans Zimmer on the music for Pirates of the Caribbean: On Stranger Tides. Whitacre co-composed the "Mermaid Theme" with Zimmer and conducted some of the choral sessions at Abbey Road Studios. His wife, Hila Plitmann, sang the solo material in the theme, having also invented the language the mermaids were singing in the film, a combination of Latin, Hebrew and, as she says, 'Elvish'. Whitacre enjoyed working with Zimmer, saying that he was a brilliant composer and a generous collaborator. Whitacre later collaborated with Zimmer for the 2016 film Batman vs Superman: Dawn of Justice.

Whitacre has written for the London Symphony Orchestra and London Symphony Chorus, the Los Angeles Master Chorale, Chanticleer, Julian Lloyd Webber and the Philharmonia Orchestra, the Tallis Scholars, the King's Singers, Dallas Winds, the Berlin Rundfunkchor, and the Minnesota Orchestra, among others. His work of music theater, Paradise Lost: Shadows and Wings, won the American Society of Composers, Authors and Publishers' Harold Arlen Award and the Richard Rodgers Award, and earned 10 nominations at the Los Angeles Stage Alliance Ovation Awards. In 2011, he conducted the winning entries of the Abbey Road 80th Anniversary Anthem Competition, recording the London Symphony Orchestra and the Eric Whitacre Singers at Abbey Road Studio 1. Whitacre's Soaring Leap initiative is a dynamic one-day workshop where singers, conductors, and composers read, rehearse and perform several of his works.

Whitacre composed "The River Cam", a work for cello and strings for the cellist Julian Lloyd Webber's sixtieth birthday, which he premiered on 14 April 2011 at the Royal Festival Hall, South Bank Centre London with the Philharmonia Orchestra. It has been recorded by Julian Lloyd Webber with the London Symphony Orchestra with Whitacre conducting for Decca Records. The inspiration for the piece was the River Cam that flows past Cambridge University where Eric Whitacre was a visiting fellow in 2010.

From October to December 2010, Whitacre was a visiting fellow at Sidney Sussex College, Cambridge, during Michaelmas (Autumn) Term. He composed a piece for the college choir, and worked with students in masterclasses and workshops. From 2011 to 2016, he was composer in residence at Sidney Sussex College. Whitacre was appointed artist in residence with the Los Angeles Master Chorale from 2016. In July 2017, he co-presented the Eurovision Choir of the Year.

== Personal life ==
From 1998 to 2017, Whitacre was married to Israeli singer Hila Plitmann. They have a son together, Esh Edward (b. 2005).

Whitacre married Belgian opera singer Laurence Servaes in Maui, Hawaii, in March 2019. They have a son together, Julian (b. 2020).

== Style ==
A trademark of Whitacre's pieces is the use of aleatoric and indeterminate sections, as well as unusual score instructions involving, in some cases, hand actions or props. His work has been described as "weightless" and as the "sort of music Vaughan Williams might have composed in the Cambridge branch of Dunkin' Donuts". Anthony Tommasini described Whitacre's "Leonardo Dreams of His Flying Machine" in 2005 as "full of sound effects, portentous harmony and fractured riffs", writing that "the music was rather hokey, like a choral equivalent of a blatant film score."

Other critics have described his style as "full of shimmering, shuddering, shifting harmonies that awaken the ear to a contemporary yet accessible voice". Whitacre's style, similar to Morten Lauridsen's, has also been characterized as "neo-impressionistic".

== Projects ==
=== Virtual Choir ===
Whitacre's Virtual Choir projects were inspired by a video sent to him of a young girl named Britlin Losee from Glen Cove, New York, singing one of his choral pieces. Singers record and upload their videos from locations all over the world. Each one of the videos is then synchronised and combined into one single performance to create the Virtual Choir. Whitacre began with a test run of Sleep, then Lux Aurumque in 2009 and then Sleep again in 2010. Whitacre's Virtual Choir performance of Lux Aurumque has received almost 6.5 million views (as of July 2020), featuring 185 singers from 12 countries.

Whitacre's Virtual Choir 2.0, "Sleep" was released in April 2011 and involved more than 2,000 voices from 58 countries.

Virtual Choir 3, Water Night, written in 1995, combined 3,746 submissions from 73 countries and was released in April 2012. By the entry close date of February 1, 2012, 3,746 videos had been uploaded by 2,945 people in 73 countries, singing one or more parts of "Water Night". On April 15, the 100th anniversary of the sinking of the Titanic, the "Water Night" Virtual Choir video was shown in the new Titanic Belfast commemorative building.

Virtual Choir 4, "Fly to Paradise", contains 8,409 videos from 5,905 people from 101 countries. It launched at the Coronation Festival at Buckingham Palace/BBC1 on July 11, 2013.

The virtual World of Color Honor Choir was put together in 2013 by Whitacre and Disney. The song "Glow" was written for the event. The final product included singers from all over the United States, totaling 1,473 singers.

The Virtual Youth Choir, in association with UNICEF, launched at the Glasgow 2014 Commonwealth Games opening ceremony. It featured 2,292 singers aged 18 and under from more than 80 countries.

On May 4, 2018, Whitacre announced that Virtual Choir 5 would be his 2015 piece Deep Field. Other Virtual Choir projects include 'Glow' written for the Winter Dreams holiday show at Disneyland Adventure Park, California. To date, the virtual choirs have registered more than 60 million views.

On May 2, 2020, during the COVID-19 pandemic, Whitacre announced that the sixth iteration of the Virtual Choir would be an original song entitled "Sing Gently". It featured 17,572 singers from 129 countries, including 16 performers using Sign Language. It had its world premiere on YouTube on July 19, 2020.

In December 2020, Sing as One, an album of Whitacre's virtual choirs, was released. The album contains recordings of all eight virtual choirs.

=== Deep Field ===
Deep Field: The Impossible Magnitude of the Universe is a 4k film for IMAX, cinema, projection in concert with live orchestra and for screenings at arts and science events. It is an audiovisual collaboration between Eric Whitacre, NASA, the Space Telescope Science Institute, Music Productions and 59 Productions. It premiered at Kennedy Space Center (Florida) in 2018 and has since been at Smithsonian Air & Space Museum, Dolby Theatre, the World Science Festival, Griffith Observatory, the American Astronomical Society Annual Meeting and in concert halls. The film is part of several STEAM education programs in North America, Europe and elsewhere.

The film is inspired by the Hubble Space Telescope, and its greatest discovery, the Deep Field image. The soundtrack composed by Whitacre features the Virtual Choir 5, representing 120 countries: more than 8,000 voices aged four to 87, alongside the Royal Philharmonic Orchestra and Eric Whitacre Singers.

=== Eric Whitacre Singers ===
The choir performs music from the Renaissance through to the current day, including Lauridsen, Britten, and the work of their founder and conductor. The Eric Whitacre Singers made their BBC Proms debut in 2012 in a program that included a collaboration with singer/songwriter Imogen Heap. The choir also sang at the Templeton Prize Laureate Ceremony for Archbishop Desmond Tutu alongside Annie Lennox, and the London African Gospel Choir. They work regularly with British soul artist Laura Mvula, and featured at the iTunes Festival, broadcast to 119 countries, performing with Hans Zimmer, and at an experiential installation for Anya Hindmarch in 2018.

=== Recording projects ===
Whitacre's first album with Decca, Light & Gold, was released in October 2010. This album won the Grammy for Best Choral Performance in 2012. Whitacre's second Decca album, Water Night, was released in April 2012 in the United States.

In 2013, Whitacre began to release music on his own independent label, UNQUIET, established as a joint venture with his managers at Music Productions. Feature releases on UNQUIET include Deep Field, Goodnight Moon and a 10-inch gatefold vinyl featuring Whitacre's choral cover of Trent Reznor's "Hurt" and his setting of E. E. Cummings' "i carry your heart".

=== Performance projects ===
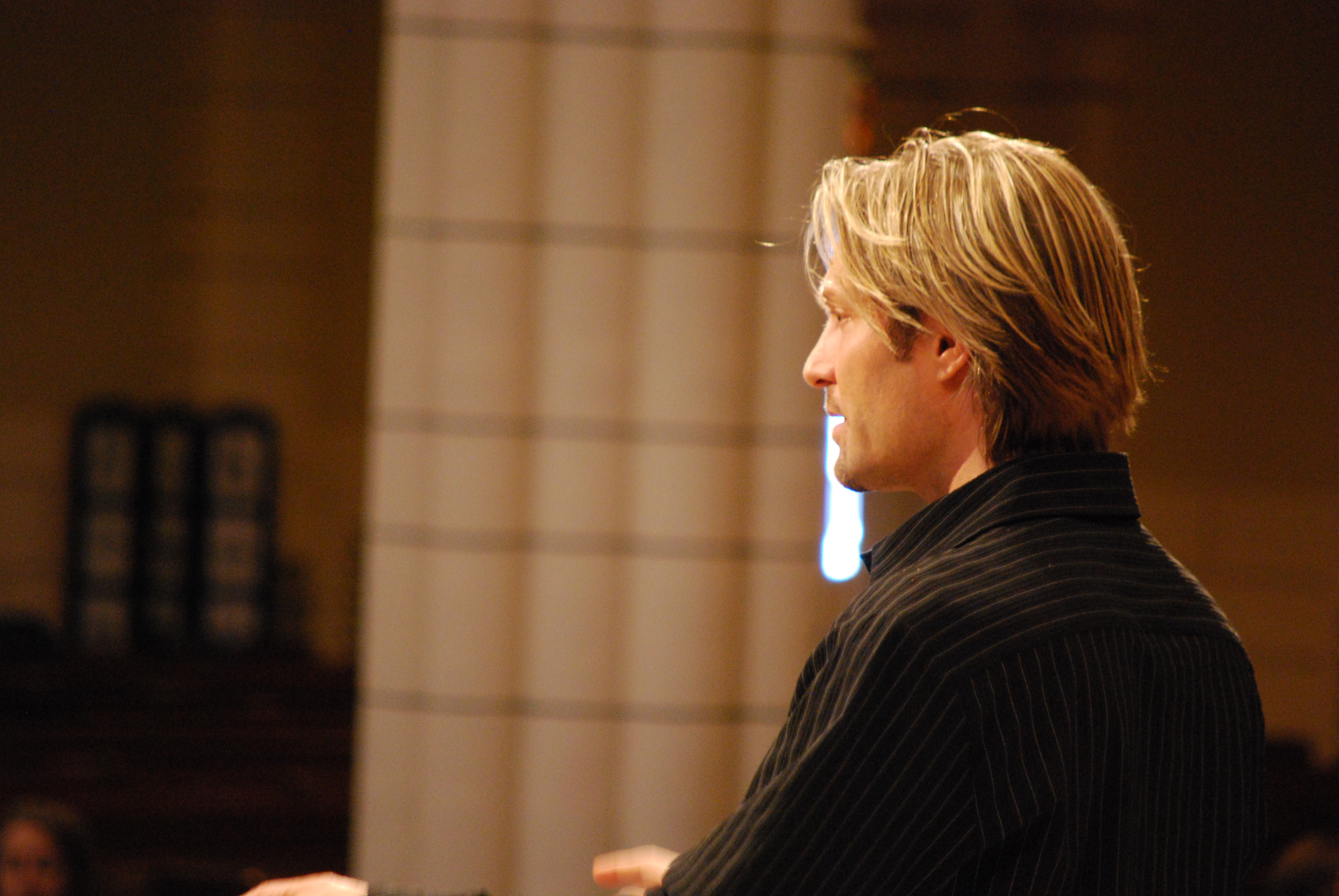
Whitacre, 2009

On October 24, 2010, Whitacre conducted an all-American program with the London Symphony Orchestra and Chorus at the Barbican London in a performance that featured his commission for the London Symphony Chorus entitled Songs of Immortality. In December 2010, Whitacre conducted the I Vocalisti choir in Hamburg, and was a guest conductor of the Christmas performance of the Berlin Rundfunkchor. In November 2010, Whitacre conducted Côrdydd, a Cardiff-based mixed choir, and friends in a concert of his work at the BBC Hoddinott Hall in the Wales Millennium Centre. He continued to develop his work of music theater, Paradise Lost: Shadows and Wings. A concert version was given at Carnegie Hall in 2010.

Whitacre is a founding member of BCM International, a quartet of composers consisting of himself, Steven Bryant, Jonathan Newman, and James Bonney, which aspires to "enrich the wind ensemble repertoire with music unbound by traditional thought or idiomatic cliché." Whitacre made his BBC Proms debut with a late-night Prom in 2012. In 2015, he returned to the Proms to conduct a program of all-American music with the Royal Philharmonic Orchestra, BBC Singers, and BBC Chorus. In 2015, Whitacre wrote Deep Field for orchestra, chorus, and mobile app; the piece was inspired by the Hubble Deep Field images and audience members play electronica from their smartphone apps.

In June 2014, Whitacre gave a live webcast from the Kennedy Center and subsequently conducted a massed choir of 400 singers on the Mall, Washington D.C., to mark Flag Day and the bicentenary of "The Star-Spangled Banner".

=== The Sacred Veil ===
Composed in 2018, The Sacred Veil is a 12-movement work from Whitacre and poet/lyricist Charles Anthony Silvestri. Silvestri's wife, Julie, died of ovarian cancer at age 36 in 2005, leaving two young children. His texts (written collaboratively with Whitacre) and the score tell a story of courtship, love, loss and the search for solace. The Los Angeles Times described the work as "memorably [celebrating] the precarious beauty of life, offering the welcome consolation of art and a momentary stay against our collective fate." The work was premiered at Walt Disney Concert Hall, Los Angeles, in February 2019, and recordings released in late August 2020.

== Awards and honors ==
Whitacre has won awards from the Barlow international composition competition, American Choral Directors Association, American Composers Forum and in 2001 became the recipient of The Raymond W. Brock Commission given by the American Choral Directors Association. His work of music theater Paradise Lost: Shadows and Wings earned him a Richard Rodgers Award and received 10 nominations at the 2007 Los Angeles Stage Alliance Ovation Awards. The album Cloudburst and Other Choral Works received a Grammy nomination in 2007 for Best Choral Performance. Later, his album "Light & Gold" won a Grammy for Best Choral Performance in 2012.

== Works ==
=== Wind ensemble ===
- October
- Sleep (choral transcription)
- Lux Aurumque (transcription of the choral work, transposed a semitone lower from C-sharp minor to C minor)
- Cloudburst (choral transcription)
- Libertas Imperio (From Paradise Lost: Shadows and Wings)
- Ghost Train
- Equus
- Noisy Wheels of Joy
- The Seal Lullaby (choral transcription)
- Godzilla Eats Las Vegas!

=== Choral ===
All works originally for mixed choir SATB unless noted otherwise

- A Boy and a Girl (poem by Octavio Paz)
- Alleluia (adapted from his October)
- Animal Crackers Volume 1
- Animal Crackers Volume 2
- Child of Wonder
- Cloudburst (poem by Octavio Paz)
- Deep Field
- Enjoy the Silence (arrangement of Martin Gore / Depeche Mode song of the same name)
- Eternity in an Hour (poem by William Blake)
- Five Hebrew Love Songs
- Fly to Paradise (Virtual Choir 4)
- Glow (commissioned by Disneyland for World of Color Winter Dreams; lyrics by Edward Esch)
- Goodnight Moon (arrangement of the children's book, initially for soprano, subsequently SSA and SATB)
- Her Sacred Spirit Soars (poem by Charles Anthony Silvestri)
- Higher, Faster, Stronger (written for the BBC Proms in 2012)
- Home, 2023 (with Voces8)
- Hurt (arrangement of Trent Reznor / Nine Inch Nails song of the same name)
- i carry your heart (poem by E. E. Cummings)
- Little Birds
- Little Tree
- Lux Aurumque (poem by Edward Esch; translated into Latin by Charles Anthony Silvestri) (also set for male chorus)
- Lux Nova (text by Edward Esch; translated into Latin by Charles Anthony Silvestri)
- Nox Aurumque (poem by Charles Anthony Silvestri)
- Oculi Omnium
- Psalm 137: By the Waters of Babylon (written originally for The Choir of Sidney Sussex, Cambridge and Dr. David Skinner, not yet published)
- Sainte-Chapelle (commissioned by the Tallis Scholars to commemorate their 40th anniversary)
- The Seal Lullaby (poem by Rudyard Kipling)
- She Weeps Over Rahoon (for female choir, poem by James Joyce)
- Sing Gently (Virtual Choir 6)
- Sleep (originally a setting of Robert Frost's poem, "Stopping by Woods on a Snowy Evening"; for copyright reasons the published version uses a specially-written text by Charles Anthony Silvestri)
- Sleep, My Child (Choral transcription from Paradise Lost: Shadows and Wings, also written for Concert Band)
- Songs of Immortality
  1. Lie still, sleep becalmed (text from Dylan Thomas's Deaths and Entrances)
  2. Do not go gentle into that good night (text from Dylan Thomas's poem of that name)
  3. After great pain (text by Emily Dickinson)
- The Boy Who Laughed at Santa Claus (for SATB chorus, Children's chorus and piano, text by Ogden Nash)
- The Chelsea Carol (commissioned by the Choirs of Birmingham-Southern College and Lester Seigel, text by Charles Anthony Silvestri)
- The City and the Sea (setting of five poems by E. E. Cummings)
  1. i walked the boulevard
  2. the moon is hiding in her hair
  3. maggie and milly and molly and may
  4. as is the sea marvelous
  5. little man in a hurry
- The Sacred Veil (lyrics by Charles Anthony Silvestri)
- The Star-Spangled Banner (text by Francis Scott Key)
- The Stolen Child (for SATB choir & six solo voices or chamber choir, joint commission by the National Youth Choir of Great Britain and the King's Singers)
- This Marriage
- Three Flower Songs
  1. I Hide Myself (poem by Emily Dickinson)
  2. With a Lily in Your Hand (poem by Federico García Lorca)
  3. Go, Lovely Rose (poem by Edmund Waller)
- Three Songs of Faith (poems by E. E. Cummings)
  1. i will wade out
  2. hope faith life love
  3. i thank You God for most this amazing day
- Time is a River (for male choir, text from Marcus Aurelius's Meditations)
- Very Soon
- Water Night (poem by Octavio Paz; translated by Muriel Rukeyser)
- When David Heard

=== Other choral works ===
- Alone (poem by Edgar Allan Poe, for male voice sextet)
- Leonardo Dreams of His Flying Machine (poem by Charles Anthony Silvestri, for SSATB & percussion)

=== Orchestra ===
- Deep Field
- Godzilla Eats Las Vegas
- October
- The River Cam
- Water Night
- Winter

=== Music theatre ===
- Paradise Lost: Shadows and Wings, music theater

=== Other arrangements ===
- Five Hebrew Love Songs; for soprano voice, solo violin, piano
- Goodnight Moon; for soprano voice and string orchestra

=== Film and television ===
- Pirates of the Caribbean: On Stranger Tides, co-composer (with Hans Zimmer) of the Mermaid Theme and choral segments
- Batman v Superman: Dawn of Justice, Choirmaster. Vocalists: Hila Plitmann, Dominic Lewis, Tory Letzler. Eric Whitacre Singers used in choral segments
- How to Train Your Dragon: The Hidden World, with composer John Powell. Eric Whitacre Singers used in choral segments
- Trigger, stock music
- Kung Fu Panda 3, Conductor and vocal arrangements
- Alligator Alley, stock music
- The Great American Songs, composer
- Enjoy the Silence, composer
