= Home (Voces8 and Eric Whitacre album) =

Studio album by Voces8, Eric Whitacre
- Released: April 14, 2023
- Recorded: April 4–10, 2022
- Studio: Voces8 Centre, London, England, UK
- Genre: Choral music
- Length: 72:42
- Language: English
- Label: Decca
- Producer: Barnaby Smith

"On one level, it is referenced in a couple of the pieces on the album, specifically in Sacred Veil. It's the major theme and the final words of the entire piece. 'Welcome home, my child. Welcome home.'"

—Eric Whitacre on naming the album Home

Home is a 2023 studio album of choral music by American composer Eric Whitacre and British vocal group Voces8. It has received positive reviews from critics.

== Reception ==
Editors at AllMusic rated this album 4.5 out of 5 stars, with critic James Manheim writing the collaboration between Whitacre and Voces8 "would be noteworthy on its face" and specifically highlights The Sacred Veil as "a major piece of choral music that will be around for decades" and Whitacre's composition "forges a distinctively dark language that is related to but distinct from his usual style". Editors at AllMusic included this among their favorite classical vocal albums of 2023. Writing for BBC Music, Kate Wakeling gave this recording five out of five stars, summing up that "when Whitacre deploys a touch more harmonic bite, his work is richly rewarding and could not hope for better advocates than VOCES8". In Gramophone, Clare Stevens, called this an "intense, beautifully crafted and very personal piece [that] speaks eloquently to young adults of today" and gave it five out of five stars. The Times' Geoff Brown rated Home three out of five stars, critiquing that "the first four tracks of Home do little to disturb the listener", but praising the talent of Voces8 and the power of The Sacred Veil.

== Track listing ==
All compositions by Eric Whitacre.

1. "Go, Lovely Rose" (text by Edmund Waller) – 4:32
2. "The Seal Lullaby" (text by Rudyard Kipling) – 4:34
3. "Sing Gently" (text by Eric Whitacre) – 3:44
4. "All Seems Beautiful to Me" (text by Walt Whitman) – 4:52

The Sacred Veil (text by Charles Anthony Silvestri, Julia Lawrence Silvestri, and Whitacre) – 55:09

5. "I. The Veil Opens" – 6:17
6. "II. In a Dark and Distant Year" – 2:06
7. "III. Home" – 3:55
8. "IV. Magnetic Poetry" – 7:09
9. "V. Whenever There Is Birth" – 3:30
10. "VI. I'm Afraid" – 5:22
11. "VII. I Am Here" – 2:10
12. "VIII. Delicious Times" – 5:07
13. "IX. One Last Breath" – 1:55
14. "X. Dear Friends" – 3:19
15. "XI. You Rise, I Fall" – 9:29
16. "XII. Child of Wonder" – 4:41

== Personnel ==
- Eric Whitacre – orchestra conducting, liner notes

Voces8

- Andrea Haines – soprano vocals
- Katie Jeffries-Harris – alto vocals
- Christopher Moore – baritone vocals on "All Seems Beautiful to Me"
- Blake Morgan – tenor vocals
- Molly Noon – soprano vocals
- Jonathan Pacey – bass vocals
- Sam Poppleton – baritone vocals on "Go, Lovely Rose", "The Seal Lullaby", "Sing Gently", and The Sacred Veil
- Barnaby Smith – alto vocals,engineering, editing, mixing, production, art direction, liner notes
- Euan Williamson – tenor vocals

Additional personnel

- Craig Beyler – associate production
- DeDe Brown – associate production
- Tony Brown – associate production
- Paul Chessell – design
- Emma Denton – cello on The Sacred Veil
- Frederic Dittmann – associate production
- Christopher Glynn – piano on "The Seal Lullaby", "Sing Gently", and The Sacred Veil
- Judy Hartman – associate production
- Helen Lewis – associate production, executive production
- James Meehan – associate production
- Bruce Ryder – associate production
- Linda Ryder – associate production
- WLP London Ltd – editing
- Jesmer Wong – associate production

== See also ==
- 2023 in American music
- 2023 in British music
- 2023 in classical music
- List of 2023 albums
