= Sunrisers Drum and Bugle Corps =

Drum corps from Long Island, New York

Sunrisers
- Location: King's Park, New York
- Division: All-Age Class
- Founded: 1953; 73 years ago
- Executive Director: David Hobart
- Championship titles: DCA Open Class: 1977; 1978; 1982; 1983; 1987; 1988; DCA Class A: 2007
- Website: sunrisersdrumcorps.org

The Sunrisers Drum and Bugle Corps is an all-age competitive drum corps based on Long Island, New York. The corps is a member of Drum Corps Associates (DCA) and Drum Corps International (DCI) and competes in the All-Age Class.

The Sunrisers have won six DCA World Class Championship titles, one DCA Class A World Championship title, and one American Legion National Championship title. The corps is historically notable for being the first in drum corps history to receive a perfect score in the General Effect Brass caption in 1978, for delivering a “tickless” snare performance in 1983, and setting a world record high Class A score in 2007. The Sunrisers also won the DCA Best Percussion award for five consecutive years and earned two consecutive DCA Best Color Guard titles.

The corps has been recognized for its role in advancing female participation in drum corps. The Sunrisers included the first DCA female color guard member, the first mixed-gender guard, the first DCA female instrumentalist and horn player, and the first DCA female lead soprano and soloist.

== History ==
=== Pre-DCA/DCI (1950–1965) ===
==== Founding (1950) ====
The Sunrisers Drum and Bugle Corps was founded in 1950 in Lakeview, West Hempstead, Long Island. Its origins trace to a meeting of a Marine Corps League, during which John Hodge, a World War II veteran and former U.S. Marine, proposed establishing a youth music program. Hodge’s proposal led to the creation of the Marine’s Memorial Drum Corps of Nassau County, initially operating as a junior parade corps.

The early corps acquired its first set of instruments from the Hempstead Fire Department for $140, a purchase that included four snare drums, two bass drums, fifteen G bugles, cymbals, and several additional instruments.

==== Transition to senior corps (1953) ====
By 1953, the junior corps was struggling due to declining youth membership. In response, Hodge announced that the Sunrisers would be re-formatted as a senior corps. The change quickly boosted membership, attracting former players from pre-war corps who had relocated to Long Island. In the spring of 1953, bugle instructor Ray Nichols assembled a 20-man hornline. The instructional staff expanded to include drum instructor Herb Weir, bass drummer Harry Porffitt, and bass drummer Fred Rose, who would later become the corps’ manager. The surge in membership enabled the purchase of new valve horns, drums, and uniforms reflecting Nassau County’s colors—orange, blue, and white. To honor Nicholas's French compositional arrangement, blue berets became the new headgear for the corps.

==== Parade corps years (1954–1957) ====
In 1954, the drum corps’ name was changed to the Sunrisers when Hodge, while listening to the radio, heard the song "The World is Waiting for the Sunrise" by Les Paul and Mary Ford. Nicholas arranged the theme for the corps and the song became the corps’ signature piece until it was later replaced with Battle Hymn of the Republic.

From 1954 through 1957, the Sunrisers were a prominent corps in the Long Island area, participating in numerous parades and exhibitions, competing in standstill competitions, and winning in all categories.

==== Competitive circuit years (1958–1965) ====
Instructor Jack Dobson and the Sunriser management enrolled the corps in the Yankee Circuit, with their first show taking place in New Rochelle in 1958. The Sunrisers placed last with a score of 58.2, but nevertheless made a strong impression on other corps, who remarked Sun was a "nice corps," noting their appreciation of their "little French berets.” From that moment forward, the Sunrisers began transforming from a parade corps into a competitive field corps.

Over the next eight years, the corps competed across both the Yankee and Northeastern circuits. With limited junior corps opportunities in New York State, younger performers increasingly joined the corps, gradually shifting its traditionally military membership into a more traditional "all-age" corps. During this period, the corps also welcomed several legendary musicians—Steve Buglino, Brian O'Connell, Skip Heaney, and Paul Keglano—whose contributions would help define the Sunrisers’ developing sound.

In 1963, the Sunrisers performed on the stage of Carnegie Hall. Sunriser lead soprano Frank Dorritie, Grammy-winning artist, recounted his experience as he stepped onto the stage:

"...the curtain opened and spots and footlights nearly blinded us. Squinting, I could make out the edge of the stage, boom stands holding Dick Blake's microphones and finally, the people in the balconies that seemed stacked one upon the other to the sky."

A significant milestone came when the corps earned third place at the Roosevelt Stadium prelims, placing among top competitors. That performance—highlighted by a Billy Cobham–inspired drum solo—marked a major turning point for the organization and signaled the Sunrisers’ emergence as a rising force on the competitive field.

=== DCA World Class (1966–1999) ===
==== Transitional years (1966–1969) ====
===== 1966 =====
The corps joined Drum Corps Associates (DCA) in 1966 after rising through the Northeastern and Interstate circuits. In their inaugural DCA season, the corps placed second to the Hawthorne Caballeros Drum and Bugle Corps by 1.10 points at J. Birney Crum Stadium in Allentown, Pennsylvania.

===== 1968 – American Legion National Championship title =====
In 1968, the Sunrisers won the American Legion National Championship. Their show was remembered for its development of a new movement style based on a relaxed, controlled 25-inch stride. The Sunrisers also performed at the Macy's Day Parade.

===== 1969 =====
Although the corps did not receive any major awards, the 1969 season is generally considered the Sunrisers’ finest of the decade. Highlights included their notable performance of “Procession of the Nobles,” the first DCA corps to introduce a female guard member as well as a mixed-gender guard, and the incorporation of G-F bugles into the corps. This year was also significant as John Sasso, former principal horn of the New York Philharmonic, began integrating ensemble etudes, exercises, and chorales into brass training. Rookie lead soprano Wayne Downey would later adapt the studies he learned at Sunrisers for use with the Blue Devils Drum and Bugle Corps.

==== Formative struggles (1970–1974) ====
From 1970 to 1972, the corps experienced a changing of the guard in staff, management, and overall direction. As DCA competition became increasingly competitive, the corps—despite being considered strong and popular—did not contend for first place.

In 1974, Mike DeLorenzo was appointed as the corps’ new director. The Sunrisers began to attract an influx of younger members from New Jersey, New York City, and Westchester County, New York. However, the corps struggled with a small hornline and ultimately finished in eighth place.

==== First wave of success (1975–1979) ====
===== 1975 =====
The corps experienced a dramatic shift toward promise in 1975. Gene Bennett--Sunriser guard captain, drum major, and drill technician--designed the Sunrisers’ visual program, while John Sasso led the brass program. Ray Fallon--widely recognized as one of the most creative brass arrangers in the drum and bugle corps community--joined John Arietano—a Sunriser brass veteran since 1966 and arranger—in taking on larger roles as brass instructors and arrangers. The corps also hired several of the most prominent percussion staff in the scene, including Dennis DeLucia, Dave Francischina, Brian Callahan, Rich Sassani, and Jim Mellon.

===== 1976 =====
In 1976, at their first show of the season in Teaneck, New Jersey, the corps adopted Aussie-style hats. They performed their opener "Procession of the Nobles" as a reference to famous 1969 season and finished third at DCA finals.

==== 1977 – DCA World Class Championship title ====
The 1977 DCA season featured a closely contested title battle between the Sunrisers and the Hawthorne Caballeros. Throughout the season, both corps consistently placed ahead of all other competitors, with the Sunrisers defeating the Caballeros in several shows and narrowly losing in others.

The Sunrisers’ 1977 show design and arrangements were led by Bennett, Arietano, and DeLucia, with additional staff support from Dave and Pete Francischina, Sassani, Tom McCarthy, Ted Sasso, and Ted Human. Tom Hart served as drum major.

At the DCA Prelims held at J. Birney Crum Stadium in Allentown, Pennsylvania, the Sunrisers finished three points ahead of the Caballeros.

At finals, the Sunrisers were awarded first place over the Caballeros by only five-hundredths of a point, scoring 94.15, earning the corps its first DCA World Championship.

===== 1978 – DCA World Class Championship title =====
In 1978, the corps won first place by nearly three points and earned caption awards for horns, percussion, color guard, and general effect. The Sunrisers also received the first-ever perfect score in the General Effect Brass caption.

===== 1979 =====
The Sunrisers entered the 1979 season with a large brass section, a highly regarded drum line, and a strong color guard. Despite these strengths, the corps was unable to secure a third consecutive championship, finishing third at finals while winning the percussion caption award.

==== Rebuilding the Corps (1980) ====
The 1980 season was a rebuilding year for the Sunrisers following the departure of several longtime members and the retirement of staff members Mike DeLorenzo and Gene Bennett. Veteran member Len Herring Jr. assumed the role of corps director, while Bobby Hoffman, formerly of the Bayonne Bridgemen, was hired to design the drill for the season. Brass arranger John Arietano introduced a version of "Send in the Clowns" that would become a signature piece for the corps, and Dennis Dewey joined as brass coordinator. The corps was awarded with the percussion caption award and placed sixth with a score of 83.150.

The season also featured a memorable incident involving the Westshoremen at finals: after their performance, the Sunrisers released a flock of birds that were expected to fly away but instead remained on the field, delaying the Sunrisers’ start. DCA judge Walter Kelly allegedly fired a pistol in an attempt to scare the birds away.

==== Second wave of success (1981–1989) ====
===== 1981 =====
In 1981, the Sunrisers debuted a bright new uniform featuring orange tunic-style tops and blue pants, alongside a show incorporating pop, jazz, and Broadway tunes. The Sunrisers’ battery won the percussion trophy at DCA Finals, and the corps placed second overall.

===== 1982 – DCA World Class Championship title =====
In 1982, the corps overcame a slow start to capture the DCA Championship, winning by two points. The percussion section again received top honors.

===== 1983 – DCA World Class Championship title =====
The 1983 season saw the Sunrisers place first at DCA Finals, while winning trophies for horns, drums, general effect, and color guard. The corps also showcased its strongest battery since its founding, marking the percussion section’s sixth consecutive year earning top honors in DCA, with the snare line delivering a standout “tickles” performance. However, key staff changes occurred: Dennis Dewey left the corps, and Dennis DeLucia and John Arietano joined the staff of the Hawthorne Caballeros.

===== 1984–1986 =====
The Sunrisers retained a core group of veteran members in 1984, but this was insufficient to contend for the DCA title. The corps finished fourth at finals.

In 1985, the corps relocated from Long Island to New Jersey. At the DCA Championships, the Sunrisers delivered a well-received performance and placed third.

The 1986 season featured a Fiddler on the Roof-themed show. The corps finished sixth at DCA Finals.

===== 1987 – DCA World Class Championship title =====
The 1987 season became known as the “rain-out” year because the DCA Championship finals were canceled due to weather. The Sunrisers had won the preliminary competition by two points. With the field rendered muddy and unsafe for marching, the decision was made to cancel the finals and award the championship based on prelims scores, giving the Sunrisers their fifth DCA title.

===== 1988 – DCA World Class Championship title =====
In 1988, Gary Williams became the director of the corps. At DCA Finals, the Sunrisers tied with the Bushwackers Drum and Bugle Corps of Princeton, New Jersey, for first place with a score of 96.36. This marked the first tie for a gold medal at DCA Finals, earning the Sunrisers their sixth competitive title.

===== 1989 =====
At the 1989 DCA Finals, the Sunrisers again tied with the Bushwakers for first place. However, under a new DCA tiebreaker system that used the overall General Effect score to determine the champion, the Bushwackers were awarded the title by one-tenth of a point over the Sunrisers.

==== Period of decline (1990–1993) ====
Following the 1989 season, the Sunrisers experienced a sharp decline in membership. In 1990, the corps placed ninth at DCA Finals. The following year, 1991, the corps missed finals entirely, finishing 11th in prelims. In 1992, the corps returned to finals in an expanded 12-corps field, finishing 12th.

In 1993, the Sunrisers went inactive for the season. However, members and alumni formed a mini-corps to compete in DCA weekend competitions. During this period, longtime drum major Tony Cataniel died. When the corps returned in 1994, his sister Rose—herself a veteran member of the Sunrisers’ color guard—stepped in as drum major.

==== Third wave of success (1994–1999) ====
In 1994, the Sunrisers returned to the championship field with a large number of veteran members, finishing 12th in DCA prelims and performing in exhibition at finals. In 1995, the corps regained finalist status with a ninth-place finish.

The corps consistently placed among the top ten over the next several seasons. In 1996, their performance of "Les Misérables" earned the DCA Best Color Guard title, with the corps finishing sixth overall. In 1997, "Spiritual Hymns & Dances" also received the color guard award, and the Sunrisers placed fourth with a score of 92.00. In 1998, the Sunrisers fielded a smaller corps with the show "Russian Sketches", placing sixth. In 1999, the Sunrisers were once again awarded the DCA Best Color Guard title and finished eighth at finals.

==== Period of inactivity (2000–2002) ====
In 2000, the Sunrisers did not field and remained inactive in 2001 and 2002.

==== DCA A Class (2003–2004) ====
In 2003, the Sunrisers returned to the field in the DCA Class A division, scoring 73.238 at the DCA Class A & Open Class Finals in Scranton, Pennsylvania. The corps placed third in 2004.

==== DCA World Class (2005–2006) ====
In 2005, the corps transitioned back to DCA World Class and placed 15th with a score of 76.913, followed by a 16th-place finish in 2006 with a score of 77.700.

==== DCA A Class (2007–2012) ====
===== 2007 – DCA Class A World Championship title =====
The 2007 season marked a major success for the Sunrisers, winning the DCA Class A World Championship with their show "Cirque de Soleil Se Levant". The corps recorded a then-record high Class A score of 83.988 in the finals and captured awards for Best Percussion, Brass, Visual, and Overall Effect.

===== 2008–2010 =====
In late 2008, the Sunrisers returned to Long Island after nearly 25 years but were unable to field. In 2009, they placed eighth in the DCA Class A Preliminaries in Rochester, New York. The corps did not return for the 2010 season.

===== 2011–2012 =====
In 2011, the Sunrisers performed "Les Misérables", marking the 15th anniversary of their 1996 performance of the same show. They placed fifth at the DCA Championship Preliminaries with a score of 73.530. In 2012, the corps again placed fifth, improving their score slightly to 75.050.

==== DCA Open Class (2013–2015) ====
===== 2013–2015 =====
The Sunrisers regained DCA Open Class status in 2013, scoring 81.030 and placing 11th. In 2014, the corps improved slightly to a score of 83.500, again placing 11th. In 2015, the Sunrisers returned to the championship field for the first time since 2007, placing ninth with a score of 85.380 at DCA Championship Finals in Rochester, New York.

===== 2016–2019 =====
From 2016 to 2018, the Sunrisers experienced a period of rebirth. In 2016, the corps performed "House of Cards", placing eighth with a score of 88.520 in Open Class. This season featured the largest membership since their last appearance in the DCA World Class in 1999, as well as their highest score since 1998.

In 2017, the corps performed "Mirage", scoring 85.680 and placing 10th at finals. In 2018, the Sunrisers scored 80.775, again placing 10th at DCA Finals in Williamsport, Pennsylvania. The 2019 season saw the corps maintain a 10th-place finish with a score of 74.750.

===== COVID-19 (2020–2021) =====
The COVID-19 pandemic led to the cancellation of both the 2020 DCA and DCI seasons. Following 2020, drum corps across both circuits experienced a noticeable decline in membership, as staff and veteran members often did not return. This made recruitment of new members challenging, and many corps folded due to financial strains worsened by the pandemic. The Sunrisers were particularly affected, as they were in the early stages of rebuilding the corps when the pandemic struck.

The corps went active again in 2021, scoring a 79.900 and placing 8th at DCA World Championships Online.

===== Inactivity (2022–2023) =====
In 2022, the Sunrisers announced the theme for the season’s show: Area 51. However, citing rising costs and reduced membership, the corps announced the suspension of the 2022 competitive season. The corps also did not field for the 2023 season.

=== DCI All-Age A Class (2024) ===
The 2024 season--the corps 70th anniversary--signified the Sunrisers’ return to competition for the first time since 2021, and their first participation in live competitive events since 2019. Following the absorption of DCA by DCI, the Sunrisers joined the DCI All-Age A-Class under the direction of David Hobart.

The Sunrisers experienced an undefeated season with their show "The Light Within", featuring selections from "Black Hole Sun", "Daylight", "Lux Aurumque", and "Becoming One of the People". The 2024 season marked the first time the corps performed at Lucas Oil Stadium in Indianapolis, Indiana, for DCI Finals. Despite their exceptional season, the Sunrisers placed second to the Govenaires Drum and Bugle Corps at finals with a score of 79.175. David Hobart was recognized as the DCI All-Age Director of the Year.

=== DCI All-Age Open Class (2025–present) ===
In the 2025 competition season, the Sunrisers returned to DCI All-Age Open Class for the first time since 2018. Their 2025 production, Move—a program described by Carolina Crown alumni and Sunriser program coordinator Kenneth Kamping as “all about that basic principle of movement”—featured engaging music and colorful visual elements, including selections from "Partita for Eight Voices", "2 Pieces for 4 Brothers", "Move", and an original composition. At finals, the corps placed ninth with a score of 83.475.

== Culture ==
=== Women in the Sunrisers ===
The Sunrisers are recognized in the marching arts scene for their progressive approach to gender inclusion. The Sunrisers included the first DCA female color guard member in 1969. The same year, they introduced a mixed-gender guard, paving the way for broader participation of women within the corps.

Judy Foster made history as the first female horn player in Drum Corps Associates (DCA) when she joined the Sunrisers from Long Island, New York, in 1971, becoming the corps’ first female instrumentalist. In 1977, the Sunrisers became the first corps to win a national championship with a female horn player.

Carol Ann Schaffer (later Fallon), who joined the Sunrisers in 1973, became the corps’ first female lead soprano and went on to become the first female lead soprano soloist in DCA history.

=== Songs ===
The Sunrisers’ corps song is "Battle Hymn of the Republic," which members sing before every show. The song pays tribute to the corps’ militaristic roots.

"Procession of the Nobles" and "Send in the Clowns" are recognized as the corps’ signature pieces.

=== Uniform changes ===
- 1953: The original uniforms reflected Nassau County’s colors: orange, blue, and white. Corps members wore blue berets, while drum majors wore white uniforms with blue sashes.
- 1959: Sunrisers switch from berets to shakos featuring a sun insignia. Sashes were also adopted.
- 1965: The jacket design was then swapped to a dolman-styled tunic.
- 1976: The corps adopted Aussie-style hats with light orange feathers and removed the dolman tunic.
- 1981: The Sunrisers debuted a bright new uniform featuring scarlet tunic-style tops, blue pants, and white sashes. The light orange feathers were replaced with white plumes.
- 1984: Blue pants were replaced with white pants.
- 1992: The tunic color was changed to white.
- 1997: The drum majors’ uniforms were updated with blue tunics and white sashes. The corps returned to scarlet tunics, white pants, and orange feathers. A sequined blue sash was added, and the Aussie hats were colored white.
- 2003: Drum major uniforms returned to white with a blue sash.
- 2014: The corps adopted new uniforms featuring traditional black shakos with white plumes. A diagonal white streak extended from the right shoulder to the right breast, with the other half in black, and the Sunrisers logo was added to the right breast. A sash combining orange and sequined blue was introduced, paired with black pants. White-and-black gauntlets were added. Drum major uniforms became entirely black, with the Sunrisers logo on the chest, a black sash with reflective shards, and an insignia on the shoulder.
- 2024: A black shoulder pad was added to drum major uniforms and shakos were removed.

=== Membership ===
The Sunrisers have historically faced challenges in maintaining membership since their founding in 1950, due to shifts in corps age demographics, interest in drum corps, and relocation efforts.

Originally, membership was limited to youth Marine Corps League members. In 1953, the corps opened its ranks to include former players from pre-war corps who had relocated to Long Island. From 1958 to 1965, the Sunrisers saw a modest increase in younger members due to limited junior corps opportunities in New York. Starting in 1974, the corps attracted more young members from New Jersey, New York City, and Westchester County. Membership sharply declined in 1980 and was further affected by the corps’ relocation from Long Island to New Jersey in 1985. An influx of members in 1994 helped, but numbers remained low.

In late 2008, the Sunrisers returned to Long Island after nearly 25 years, but were unable to field a corps due to insufficient membership. The 2016 season marked the highest membership since the corps first went inactive after 1999. Following the COVID-19 pandemic in 2020, membership again declined sharply.

By 2024, the Sunrisers shifted recruitment toward younger students. Hobart and Kamping described Long Island as a “large, thriving marching band hotbed,” and the corps focused on training student performers to strengthen their school and college programs. This strategy increases the likelihood that schools will encourage students to join the Sunrisers.

== Show summary (1972–2026) ==
DCA World Class Championship Title
DCA World Class Championship Finalist
DCA/DCI Open Class World Championship Title
DCA/DCI Open Class World Championship Finalist
DCA/DCI Class A World Championship Title
DCA/DCI Class A World Championship Finalist
- 1960–1965: Competitive Circuit Years
- 1966-2023: Drum Corps Associates (DCA)
- 2024-Present: Drum Corps International (DCI)

Year	Show Name	Repertoire	World Championships	
Year	Show Name	Repertoire	Score	Placement
1972			76.000	8th: Finalist
1973		Procession of the Nobles * Great Gate of Kiev (from Pictures At An Exhibition) * Chester * When Johnny Comes Marching Home * Tears on My Pillow * A Little Help From My Friends * Sweet Caroline * Hi-De-Ho (That Old Sweet Roll) * ? * Killing Me Softly with His Song	66.800	9th: Finalist
1974			59.700	8th: Finalist
1975		Sing Sing Sing * And The Angels Sing * Porgy and Bess * Joker * Sunrise Fanfare	80.700	7th: Finalist
1976		Procession of the Nobles * Sabre Dance (from Gayne Ballet) * Spain * Ol' Man River (from Show Boat) * Sing Sing Sing * Dance Of The Wind-Up Toy * Greensleeves * Musical Salute To Our Nation's 200th Birthday	86.550	3rd: Finalist
1977		English Folk Song Suite * Spain * Ol' Man River (from Show Boat) * Eli's Coming * Dance Of The Wind-Up Toy (drum solo) * Evergreen (from A Star is Born)	94.150	1st: DCA World Class Championship title
1978		English Folk Song Suite * Malaga * Farandole (from L'Arlesienne) * Evergreen (from A Star is Born)	90.850	1st: DCA World Class Championship title 1st Perfect Score in DCA History
1979		Crown Imperial * Mama-Llaga * Malaga * Medley (from The Wiz) * Ding Dong the Witch is Dead (from Wizard of Oz) * Superman Theme (from Superman)	88.300	3rd: Finalist
1980		Crown Imperial * Alone (from Born to Sing) * Central Park * Ding Dong the Witch is Dead (from Wizard of Oz) * Send in the Clowns (from A Little Night Music) * Joker	83.150	5th: Finalist
1981		Come Follow the Band (from Barnum) * Late in the Evening * Legend of the One-Eyed Sailor * Barnum's Revenge * Send in the Clowns (from A Little Night Music) * Thunder and Blazes	89.100	2nd: Finalist
1982		God Save the Queen * English Suite for Military Band * Barnum's Revenge * Tiger of San Pedro * Legend of the One-Eyed Sailor * Send in the Clowns (from A Little Night Music) * Come Follow the Band (from Barnum)	89.850	1st: DCA World Class Championship title
1983		Meadowland * Alexander's Ragtime Band * Legend of the One-Eyed Sailor * Peasant Dance * Send in the Clowns (from A Little Night Music) * Come Follow the Band (from Barnum)	91.450	1st: DCA World Class Championship title Tickless Snare Performance
1984		Meadowland * Niner Two * Samba * Tiger of San Pedro	86.450	4th: Finalist
1985		Adventures on Earth (from E.T.) * Niner Two * Grace * Power Suite * Theme from E.T.	90.600	3rd: Finalist
1986	Fiddler on the Roof	Prologue/Tradition (from Fiddler on the Roof) * Sabbath Prayer (from Fiddler on the Roof) * To Life (from Fiddler on the Roof) * Sunrise, Sunset (from Fiddler on the Roof) * Chava (from Fiddler on the Roof) * Weding Celebration (from Fiddler on the Roof)	85.300	6th: Finalist
1987		Adventures on Earth (from E.T.) * Jupiter (from The Planets)	94.840	1st: DCA World Class Championship title
1988		Savannah River Holiday * Concerto in F * An American in Paris	96.360	1st: DCA World Class Championship title 1st Tie for Gold at DCA Finals
1989		Savannah River Holiday * Rhapsody in Blue	95.000	2nd: Finalist
1990		Moorside March (from A Moorside Suite) * Firebird Suite	86.800	9th: Finalist
1991		Toccata & Fugue in D Minor * Ave Maria * Jim's New Life (from Empire of the Sun) * Tonight (from West Side Story)	77.300	11th
1992		Liferaft Derf * Adventures on Earth (from E.T.) * Mars (from The Planets) * Throneroom (from Star Wars) * Finale (from Star Wars)	80.800	12th: Finalist
1993		You Are The Sunshine Of My Life * Sassy Samba * Don't Let The Sun Go Down On Me		
1994		Procession of the Nobles * Send in the Clowns (from A Little Night Music) * Malaga * E.T. & Me (from E.T.) * Finale (from E.T.)	79.400	12th
1995	New World Symphony	New World Symphony	84.600	Finalist: 9th
1996	Les Misérables	Work Song (from Les Miserables) * At the End of the Day (from Les Miserables) * On My Own (from Les Miserables) * Plumet Attack (from Les Miserables) * One Day More (from Les Miserables)	90.400	Finalist: 6th
1997	Spiritual Hymns & Dances – D. Holsinger	On an American Spiritual * Havendance * On a Hymnsong of Philip Bliss * Nilesdance * On a Southern Hymnsong	92.000	Finalist: 4th
1998	Russian Sketches	Festive Overture * Romance (from Lieutenant Kije) * Comedians' Galop * Russian Sailor's Dance (from The Red Poppy)	89.500	Finalist: 6th
1999	An American Celebration	American Salute * Yankee Doodle Dandy * Shenandoah * Stars and Stripes Forever	87.000	Finalist: 8th
2000	A Copland Centennial Celebration	Fanfare for the Common Man * 3rd Symphony (excerpts) * Lincoln Portrait Chorale * Appalachian Spring * Simple Gifts (from Appalachian Spring)		
2001	Sunstorm	Festive Overture * Meadowland * Romance (from Lieutenant Kije) * Dance of the Tumblers		
2003	Celtic Sun	Fanfare * Tomorrow Is My Dancing Day * Highland Cathedral * Lord Of The Dance	73.238	2nd: Finalist
2004	Something Old, Something New, Something Orange, Something Blue"	Where's Teddy? * Classical Gas * Legend of the One-Eyed Sailor	73.563	3rd
2005	The Tell-Tale Heart	The Tell-Tale Heart	76.913	15th
2006	A Touch Of Class	Pagliacci * Clair de Lune (from Suite Bergamasque) * Bolero * Nessun Dorma (from Turandot)	77.700	16th
2007	Cirque du Soleil Se Levant	Atmadja (from Quidam) * Distorted (from La Nouba) * Quidam/Seisouso/Urban * Ninkou Latora/Incantation	83.988	1st: DCA Class A World Championship title Record High Class A Score
2008		Man of La Mancha (from Man of La Mancha) * Dulcinea (from Man of La Mancha) * The Impossible Dream (from Man of La Mancha)		
2009	Homage: Three Tapestries	Movement I – Regnum * Movement II – Sacra * Movement III – Proelium	65.263	8th: Finalist
2010	Africa	Africa Ceremony, Song & Ritual * Shadowlands * The Stampede		
2011	Les Misérables	I Dreamed a Dream (from Les Miserables) * On My Own (from Les Miserables) * Attack on Rue Plumet (from Les Miserables) * One Day More (from Les Miserables)	73.530	5th: Finalist
2012	Carmen	Overture (from Carmen) * La Habanera (from Carmen) * Intermezzo (from Carmen) * Treador (from Carmen)	75.050	5th: Finalist
2013	A Painter's Canvas		81.030	11th
2014	1917: The Rise and Fall	Procession of the Nobles * Comedians' Galop * Fire Of Eternal Glory * Infernal Dance (from Firebird Suite) * Finale (from the Firebird Suite)	83.500	11th
2015	Come Fly With Me	El Camino Real * Cavalleria Rusticana * Jai Ho from Slumdog Millionaire * Marseilles	85.380	9th: Finalist
2016	House of Cards	May Be a Price To Pay * Tempered Steel * Diamonds Are a Girl's Best Friend(from Gentlemen Prefer Blondes) * Sparkling Diamonds * In the Spring, at the Time When Kings Go Off to War	88.520	8th: Finalist
2017	Mirage	Festival of Light * Caravan * Danse Bacchanale from Samson and Delilah	85.680	10th: Finalist
2018	Outside In	A Kaleidoscope of Mathematics from (A Beautiful Mind) * Always on my Mind * Fly to Paradise * On my Mind * Dance of Vengeance (from Medea)	80.775	10th: Finalist
2019	Into the Deep Blue	A Walk on Water * Songs Of Sailor and Sea * Bridge Over Troubled Water * Cyclone * Victory At Sea	74.750	10th: Finalist
2021	Portraits by Gershwin	Rhapsody in Blue * An American in Paris	79.900	8th: Finalist
2024	The Light Within	Black Hole Sun * Daylight * Lux Aurumque * Becoming One of the People	79.175	2nd: Finalist
2025	Move	Partita for Eight Voices * 2 Pieces for 4 Brothers, * Original Music * Move	83.475	9th: Finalist
2026	Outlaw	Leviathan / Poor Wayfaring Stranger / Bad Guy / Wanted Dead or Alive	73.825	13th Place
