= Sleep (Whitacre) =

2000 choral composition by Eric Whitacre

Sleep is a composition for a cappella choir by Eric Whitacre, with lyrics by Charles Anthony Silvestri. He composed it in 2000, setting a poem, "Stopping by Woods on a Snowy Evening" by Robert Frost. When the lyrics were found still under copyright, Whitacre enlisted Silvestri to write new lyrics to the existing music.

== History ==
In 1999, attorney and professional vocalist Julia Armstrong commissioned Whitacre to compose a choral composition as a memorial to her parents. She suggested the poem "Stopping by Woods on a Snowy Evening" that Robert Frost had published in 1923, and wanted the work to be premiered by the 16-voice choral ensemble Austin ProChorus in Austin, Texas, being a member of the group. Whitacre set the composition for eight parts (SSAATTBB), and it was premiered by the choir in October 2000.

After the work was performed also by The Concordia Choir, conducted by René Clausen, and at the 2001 national convention of the American Choral Directors Association, Whitacre learned that the Frost poem was still under U.S. copyright, and he could not publish the work before the copyright expired, without the consent of the Frost literary estate, which refused to grant permission. Rather than giving up publishing the work, Whitacre asked poet and frequent collaborator Charles Anthony Silvestri to write a new text which would correspond to the meter of the Frost poem and to the expressive details Whitacre had emphasized in the music. The next day Silvestri offered the poem "Sleep", taking up the theme of sleep from the last stanza of Frost's poem. Whitacre has stated that he prefers the Silvestri text over the original.

Whitacre selected the piece for his "virtual choir" project in 2010, in which videos submitted by hundreds of volunteer singers were combined to produce a video representation of a combined performance.

Whitacre originally believed the Frost poem's copyright would not expire until 2038; it in fact expired on 1 January 2019.

On May 7, 2025, Eric Whitacre posted the following on Facebook: "Recently, the Frost poem became public domain and we can finally present the original setting, exactly as it was first composed in 2000. I find it fascinating how musically different the piece becomes depending on which poem is sung... I love both versions, and I am so happy to be able to now offer Stopping By Woods on a Snowy Evening as it was originally composed."

== Performances, recordings and arrangements ==
The work appears on Whitacre's 2010 album Light and Gold, his first album for Decca and the first he conducted himself, performed by a group called the Whitacre Singers. Sleep was also recorded in collaboration with Whitacre in 2001 by the BYU Singers and was included in a 2005 collection of choral works by Whitacre performed by Polyphony and conducted by Stephen Layton.

Sleep has also been arranged for concert band and string orchestra.
