= Hawthorne Caballeros Drum and Bugle Corps =

Drum and bugle corps

The Hawthorne Caballeros
- Location: Hawthorne, New Jersey
- Division: World Class
- Founded: 1946
- Director: James J. Costello Jr.
- Championship titles: DCA: 1970, 1972, 1973, 1974, 1976, 1984, 1985, 1995, 2003, 2021

The Hawthorne Caballeros Drum and Bugle Corps is an all-age competitive drum and bugle corps based in Hawthorne, New Jersey, sponsored by American Legion Post No. 199. The corps is a member of Drum Corps Associates (DCA) and Drum Corps International (DCI), competing in the All-Age World Class division.

The Caballeros have won the DCA World Championship ten times, the American Legion National Title sixteen times, the National Dream Contest seventeen times, and the New Jersey State American Legion Title forty-three times. They have completed five undefeated seasons, including consecutive undefeated seasons in 1984 and 1985, and have placed in the top three at the DCA World Championship thirty-six times in fifty-six appearances.

The corps has performed at Carnegie Hall and the Macy's Thanksgiving Day Parade. They have appeared for several professional sports organizations, including the New York Giants, New York Jets, New York Yankees, Cleveland Browns, Philadelphia Eagles, and Washington Commanders. The Caballeros have also performed at the 1953 inaugural parade of President Dwight D. Eisenhower and have performed for Queen Elizabeth II. Additionally, the corps has traveled to Havana, Cuba as guests of the United States Department of State and marched in the city’s Mardi Gras parade.

The corps is credited for being the first senior drum corps to establish weekend camps and win a season undefeated.

== History ==
=== Origins (1930–1945) ===
The origins of the Hawthorne Caballeros date back to the 1930s with the St. George Cadets, a junior corps based in Paterson, New Jersey.

James J. Costello Jr., later the founder of the Caballeros, joined the St. George Cadets as a drummer at age eleven and remained with the corps until joining the United States Navy 1942. Following the end of World War II in 1945, Costello and many other returning servicemen resumed civilian life. Several veterans and former cadets were motivated to continue their involvement in senior drum corps activities.

=== Founding (1946) ===
James J. Costello Jr., Bob Costello, George Hayek, Joe Scarber, and John McAuliffe—many of whom were former St. George Cadets members and military veterans—founded the organization that would become the Hawthorne Caballeros. The corps was officially established on March 20, 1946, initially under the name Hawthorne Drum and Bugle Corps.

In April 1946, the corps secured sponsorship from American Legion Post No. 199 in Hawthorne, New Jersey, which provided an initial loan of $1,000 to purchase instruments and equipment.

The corps made its first public appearance at a Memorial Day parade in 1946, performing in military-style uniforms.

=== The American Legion National Championships (1947–1980) ===
==== Late 1940s ====
===== 1947 =====
Early in its development, the organization sought to move away from traditional cadet-style uniforms and music. Following a suggestion from James Costello Sr., the corps adopted a style inspired by the San Gabriel Dons of American Legion Post No. 442. The Dons, who won the American Legion National Championships in 1935 and 1937, were known for their Spanish-style uniforms featuring white satin blouses, red satin sashes, black bell-bottom trousers with red side pleats, and black sombreros. The Hawthorne corps modeled its uniform on this design and adopted the name “Caballeros.”

The Caballeros debuted their trademark uniform in May, 1947. They competed in their first field competition in Trenton, New Jersey on July 20, 1947. Their first appearance at the American Legion National Championships took place on August 29, 1947, at Randalls Island Stadium in New York, where they tied for eighth place.

===== 1948 =====
While the Caballeros placed first at the Legion State Championship at Wildwood, New Jersey, the Caballeros tied for fifth in the Miami American Legion National Championships.

===== 1949 =====
At the 1949 American Legion National Championships in Philadelphia, the Caballeros were eliminated after placing 11th in the preliminary contest. The result was a significant setback for the corps and led to serious consideration of disbanding.

==== The 1950s ====
===== 1950 =====
The corps did not attend the American Legion National Championship.

===== 1951 - American Legion National Title =====
In 1951, the Caballeros won their first American Legion National Championship. While attending the event in Miami, the corps was offered an opportunity by the United States Department of State to travel to Havana for a performance, but prior commitments prevented them from accepting the invitation. The corps also made its first appearance in the Macy's Thanksgiving Day Parade.

===== 1952 =====
The Caballeros placed second at the American Legion National Championship and again appeared in the Macy’s Thanksgiving Day Parade.

===== 1953 - American Legion National Title =====
In 1953, the corps won their second American Legion National Championship. In addition to performing at the Macy’s Thanksgiving Day Parade, they were invited to march in the inaugural parade of President Dwight D. Eisenhower in January.

===== 1954 - American Legion National Title =====
The Caballeros won their third American Legion National Championship in 1954 and performed in the Macy’s Thanksgiving Day Parade.

===== 1955 - National Dream Contest Winners =====
In 1955, the corps won the National Dream Contest in Jersey City, New Jersey. The corps’ final standing at the American Legion National Championship is not available.

===== 1956 =====
The Caballeros placed second in the National Dream Contest. The corps’ final standing at the American Legion National Championship is not available.

===== 1957 =====
In 1957, the corps introduced an off-the-line and final fanfare arrangement of "España Cañí," commonly known as "the rumps" by the drum corps community. A version of this fanfare has been included in every Caballeros performance since its introduction in 1957. They placed fourth at the American Legion National Championship and appeared in the Macy’s Thanksgiving Day Parade.

===== 1958 - American Legion National Title =====
The Caballeros won their fourth American Legion National Championship at Soldier Field in 1958. Following the championship, they accepted an invitation from the United States Department of State to tour Havana, Cuba.

During this period, Richard Blake’s Fleetwood Records in Revere, Massachusetts featured the Caballeros on multiple albums. Their 1958 album "Off the Line", which prominently featured the corps, became Fleetwood’s best-selling record. The corps also performed in the Macy’s Thanksgiving Day Parade.

===== 1959 - American Legion National Title =====
In 1959, the corps won their fifth American Legion National Championship. The senior corps traveled to Cuba again as guests of the United States Department of State, touring Havana, Cuba and participating in the city’s Mardi Gras parade.

That year, they also established the Hawthorne Muchachos Drum and Bugle Corps: the Hawthorne Caballeros junior corps under the leadership of Caballeros drum major Ralph Silverbrand.

==== The Early-Mid 1960s ====
===== 1960 - American Legion National Title =====
In 1960, the corps won their sixth American Legion National Title.

This year, the Caballeros also became the first senior drum corps to establish weekend training camps, holding intense pre-season sessions at locations such as Fort Dix, New Jersey and West Point, New York.

===== 1961 - American Legion National Title =====
In 1961, the Caballeros won their seventh American Legion National Championship and became the first senior corps to complete a season undefeated. They also resumed appearances in the Macy’s Thanksgiving Day Parade.

===== 1962-1964 - 3x American Legion National Title =====
Between 1962 and 1964, the Caballeros won their eighth, ninth, and tenth American Legion National Championships. They appeared in the Macy’s Thanksgiving Day Parade each year, including a notable performance of "Johnny One Note" in Herald Square in 1964.

===== 1965 =====
The corps’ final standing at the American Legion National Championship is not available.

=== Drum Corps Associates (DCA) World Class & The American Legion National Championships (1966-1980) ===
==== The Late 1960s ====
===== 1966 - American Legion National Title =====
The Caballeros won their eleventh American Legion National Championship and joined Drum Corps Associates (DCA). They placed fifth in their first DCA Championship Finals in Bridgeport, Connecticut. The corps also performed at the Macy’s Thanksgiving Day Parade and performed an arrangement of Strangers in the Night in Herald Square.

===== 1967–1969 =====
In 1967, the corps placed second at both the American Legion National Championship and the DCA Championship.

In 1968, the Caballeros finished eighth at the DCA Championship Finals, their lowest placement in the competition’s history. The corps’ final standing at the American Legion National Championship is not available. During this period, the corps faced significant declines in membership and maintained a policy of admitting only male members, despite broader changes in the drum corps community regarding gender inclusion. In 1969, the corps placed seventh in the DCA Championships and second at the American Legion Nationals in Atlanta. Membership levels continued to decline during this period.

==== The 1970s ====
===== 1970 - DCA World Championship Title & National Dream Contest Winner =====
In the pre-season winter of the 1970 championships, the Caballeros implemented several significant organizational changes, including the hiring of Larry Kerchner— a Berklee College of Music graduate and former Blue Rock junior corps member— as music arranger and instructor, and the appointment of Jim Russo as permanent drum major. Kerchner introduced a new musical approach while preserving the powerful “wall of sound” long associated with the corps.

In 1970, the Caballeros won the National Dream Contest at Roosevelt Stadium in Jersey City, New Jersey. Later that year, on Labor Day weekend, they captured their first DCA World Championship Title in Rochester, New York.

Placement at the American Legion National Championship for this year is not recorded.

===== 1971 =====
The Caballeros placed second in the DCA Championships. Placement at the American Legion National Championship is not known.

===== 1972-1974 - 3x DCA World Championship Title =====
In 1972, the corps won their second DCA Championship. They also performed in the Macy’s Thanksgiving Day Parade, performing "Everybody’s Everything" in Herald Square. Their American Legion Championship placement is not recorded.

In 1973, the Caballeros completed an undefeated season and won their third DCA Championship. Their American Legion Championship placement is not known.

In 1974, the corps won their fourth DCA Championship. The American Legion Championship placement for this year is not recorded.

===== 1975 =====
In 1975, the Caballeros placed third at the DCA Championships. Although their American Legion Championship placement is not known, this was the final year the corps competed in the Legion Championships until 1980.

===== 1976 - DCA World Championship Title =====
In 1976, the Caballeros won their fifth DCA Championship and became the first corps to receive awards in all competitive captions.

In July 1976, they performed for Queen Elizabeth II during her visit to the United States for the Bicentennial celebrations.

In September, the corps performed before a crowd of 78,000 at the opening day of Giants Stadium. While the Caballeros had previously performed for the New York Giants at the Yale Bowl in New Haven, Connecticut, and at Yankee Stadium, 1976 marked the beginning of their regular halftime appearances at Giants Stadium, a tradition that continued for several years; the exact end date is not documented.

===== 1977–1979 =====
The Caballeros placed second at the DCA Championships in both 1977 and 1978, finishing behind the Sunrisers Drum and Bugle Corps of Long Island, New York. In 1979, they again placed second, this time to the Reading Buccaneers Drum and Bugle Corps of Reading, Pennsylvania.

===== 1980 - American Legion Championship Title =====
In 1980, the Caballeros competed in the American Legion Championship for the final time, winning the title in Boston, Massachusetts. The corps also placed second at the DCA Championships.

=== Drum Corps Associates (DCA) World Class (1980-2023) ===
==== The 1980s ====
===== 1981 =====
The Caballeros placed fifth at the DCA Championships.

===== 1982 =====
The corps placed fourth at the DCA Championships. This year also marked the first season in which women were eligible for membership, following internal debate within the organization regarding the policy change.

===== 1983 =====
The Caballeros finished second at the DCA Championships, placing behind the Sunrisers Drum and Bugle Corps.

===== 1984-1985 - 2x DCA World Championship Titles =====
In both 1984 and 1985, the Caballeros completed undefeated seasons and won the DCA Championship, earning their sixth and seventh titles.

===== 1986–1989 =====
In 1986, the corps placed third at the DCA Championships. They finished second to the Sunrisers Drum and Bugle Corps in 1987 and placed fifth in 1988.

In 1989, the Caballeros finished third at the DCA Championships, and fans selected the corps as their “all-time favorite drum and bugle corps.”

==== The 1990s ====
===== 1990–1994 =====
In 1990, the Caballeros placed third at the DCA Championships. They finished second in 1991, followed by third-place finishes in both 1992 and 1993.

In 1994, the corps placed second at the DCA Championships and established the Hawthorne Caballeros Alumni Drum & Bugle Corps.

===== 1995 - DCA World Championship Title =====
In 1995, the Caballeros won their eighth DCA Championship title.

===== 1996–1999 =====
The corps placed second at the 1996 DCA Championships. They finished third in both 1997 and 1998, and placed fifth in 1999.

==== The 2000s ====
===== 2000–2002 =====
In 2000, the Caballeros placed second at the DCA Championships. They finished third in 2001 and sixth in 2002.

===== 2003 - DCA World Championship Title =====
In 2003, the Caballeros won the DCA World Championship, earning their ninth DCA title.

===== 2004–2009 =====
In 2004 and 2006, the corps placed fourth at the DCA Championships. They finished seventh in 2005 and second in 2007. The Caballeros did not field a competitive corps in 2008.

In 2009, the corps returned to competition and placed fifth at the DCA Finals.

==== The 2010s ====
===== 2010–2014 =====
In 2010 and 2011, the Caballeros placed fifth at the DCA Championships. They finished third in both 2012 and 2014, and earned a second-place finish in 2013.

===== 2015 =====
In 2015, the corps placed fourth at the DCA Championship Finals. This season also marked a historic visual change, as the Caballeros updated their traditional white satin shirts and kick-pleated pants to a new black, white, and red uniform—the first major uniform redesign in the corps’ history.

===== 2016–2020 =====
In 2016 and 2017, the Caballeros placed fourth at the DCA Championships. They finished sixth in 2018 and returned to a third-place finish in 2019.

==== The 2020s ====
===== 2021 - DCA World Championship Title =====
In their 75th anniversary season, the Hawthorne Caballeros achieved an undefeated season and won their tenth DCA World Championship title.

===== 2022–2023 =====
In 2022 and 2023, the corps placed second at the DCA Championship Finals.

=== Drum Corps International (DCI) All-Age World Class (2024-Present) ===
==== 2024–2025 ====
In 2024, following the newly formed partnership between Drum Corps International (DCI) and Drum Corps Associates (DCA), the Hawthorne Caballeros joined the DCI All-Age Class. That year, the corps performed at Lucas Oil Stadium in Indianapolis, Indiana, for the first-ever DCI All-Age Championships, placing second with a score of 93.825.

In 2025, the Caballeros again placed second at the DCI All-Age Championships, earning a score of 95.775.

== Other corps ==
=== The Hawthorne Muchachos Drum and Bugle Corps (1959–1977) ===
The Hawthorne Muchachos were formed in 1959 under the leadership of Caballeros drum major Ralph Silverbrand. The corps was created primarily to introduce younger performers from Hawthorne, New Jersey and the surrounding communities to drum corps activity, while also establishing a developmental pipeline for the senior Caballeros; members would “graduate” into the Caballeros after turning twenty-two and aging out of junior competition.

The Muchachos wore uniforms closely modeled after those of the senior corps, with only minor trim variations, and shared instructional staff and rehearsal facilities with the Caballeros.

In their first two competitive seasons, the Muchachos achieved undefeated records in local entry-level circuits. In 1961, they advanced into national competition, joining the junior circuit that would later become part of Drum Corps International (DCI). With a high score of fourth place in 1974, the corps competed in the DCI circuit until 1975, when the corps was disqualified from further competition within the DCI circuit for marching with overage members.

The corps continued to be active until 1977 when the corps disbanded due to financial difficulties and declining membership.

Years later, an alumni-led organization revived the Muchachos name with a smaller ensemble based in Manchester, New Hampshire. This group continued performing until announcing its “retirement” from DCI after the 2023 season. Beginning in 2024, the ensemble shifted its focus to legacy preservation and limited performances, with plans to explore a new direction for the future.

=== The Hawthorne Caballeros Alumni Drum & Bugle Corps (1994–present) ===
The Hawthorne Caballeros Alumni Drum & Bugle Corps was established in 1994 by a group of former members of the Hawthorne Caballeros. Designed as a non-competitive ensemble, the alumni corps performs exclusively in exhibitions, parades, and special events. The group marches in the original Hawthorne Caballeros uniform and performs on traditional G bugles.

The musical program is arranged by Frank Pisillo, a former Caballeros member and horn instructor, who also leads the horn line with assistance from Jim D'Amico. The drum line is arranged and instructed by longtime snare drummers and adjudicators Bobby Peterson and Dan Raymond.

The ensemble includes approximately one hundred performers representing multiple states, including New Jersey, Pennsylvania, Connecticut, Vermont, Massachusetts, Delaware, Virginia, Florida, and California. Membership spans five decades of Caballeros history and has included four members of the original 1946 corps: Joe Scarber, George Hayek, Joe Doran, and founder of the Hawthorne Caballeros James J. Costello Jr.

== Culture ==
=== Attitude Toward Women ===
In 1968, the Sunrisers Drum and Bugle Corps became the first Drum Corps Associates (DCA) corps to incorporate women into their ranks. Although initially seen as a notable departure from tradition, most other senior corps followed suit shortly thereafter. By the early 1970s, nearly all senior corps had adopted coeducational membership policies; however, the Hawthorne Caballeros and the New York Skyliners Drum and Bugle Corps continued to admit only men, maintaining long-standing traditions within their organizations.

In 1981, the New York Skyliners Drum and Bugle Corps ended their male-only policy and began accepting women. During the early 1980s, the Caballeros faced growing challenges in fully staffing their color guard, and internal discussions regarding gender inclusion intensified. In 1982, following significant debate within the organization, the Caballeros officially opened membership to women for the first time—an organizational shift that earlier generations of members had considered unlikely.

=== Impact on the American Legion and Drum Corps Associates (DCA) ===
As the postwar decades progressed and senior drum corps became increasingly staffed by non-veterans, many participants and administrators viewed the competition rules of the American Legion and Veterans of Foreign Wars (VFW) as outdated, inflexible, and overly restrictive. Because both organizations were rooted in military tradition, significant changes to competition format or stylistic approach were generally not accepted, which contributed to concerns that the activity was not evolving in step with broader trends in drum corps performance.

The Hawthorne Caballeros, as one of the American Legion’s most successful and visible senior corps, were often perceived as emblematic of the Legion’s traditional framework. Among many senior corps, frustration grew over the Legion’s reluctance to modernize its rules, a sentiment that contributed to a broader movement toward establishing a new sanctioning body dedicated solely to drum corps competition.

These discussions ultimately led to the formation of Drum Corps Associates (DCA) in 1965, marking a defining shift in the structure and governance of senior drum corps competition.

=== Uniforms ===
The Hawthorne Caballeros initially wore traditional military-style uniforms throughout 1946. In 1947, on the corps’ first anniversary,

they debuted the uniform that would become their trademark and one of the most widely recognized in senior drum and bugle corps competition.

The design was inspired by the San Gabriel Dons of American Legion Post No. 442, a California-based corps that Jim Costello Sr.—father of Jim Costello Jr., Caballeros founder—had admired. The Dons, winners of the American Legion Nationals in 1935 and 1937, wore a Spanish-style uniform featuring a white satin blouse, red satin sash, black bell-bottom trousers with red side pleats, and a black sombrero. Following Costello Sr.’s suggestion, the Hawthorne corps adopted a similar style, which became synonymous with their identity.

In 2015, the Caballeros introduced their first major uniform redesign in corps history, updating the traditional white satin shirts and kick-pleated pants to a new black, white, and red color scheme. Beginning in 2019, the corps began modifying their uniforms annually to reflect each show’s theme, aligning with contemporary trends in modern drum corps performance.

== Show summary (1972–2026) ==
Key
Blue background indicates DCI All-Age Finalist
Gold background indicates DCI All-Age Champion

- 1966-2023: Drum Corps Associates (DCA)
- 2024-present: Drum Corps International (DCI)

Year		Repertoire	World Championships	
Year		Repertoire	Score	Placement
1972		El Gato Montes * Captain From Castile * Theme from Patton * Everybody's Everything * Sabre Dance (from Gayne Ballet) * Cha Cha Cha Flamenco * Samba de Orpheo	90.600	1st Place; DCA; Champion
1973		Man of La Mancha * South Rampart Street Parade * Everybody's Everything * Sabre Dance (from Gayne Ballet) * Cha Cha Cha Flamenco * Harmonica Man	89.850	1st Place; DCA; Champion
1974		Man of La Mancha * Sweet Gypsy Rose * Soul Train * MacArthur Park * Cha Cha Cha Flamenco * Harmonica Man	83.500	1st Place; DCA; Champion
1975		Conquest (from Captain From Castile) * TSOP (from Soul Train) * Opening Theme (from Chico and the Man) * MacArthur Park * Cha Cha Cha Flamenco * Closing Theme (from Chico and the Man)	91.110	2nd Place; DCA; Finalist
1976		Bully * Brazil (from The Gang's All Here) * Echano * Cha Cha Cha Flamenco * Hill Where the Lord Hides	92.500	1st Place; DCA; Champion
1977		Bully * Echano * Pagliacci * Closing Theme (from Chico and the Man)	94.100	2nd Place; DCA; Finalist
1978		España Cañí (Spanish Gypsy Dance) * Land of Make Believe (Drum Solo) * Echano * Pagliacci * Salsation (Drum Solo) * Espirito del Toro	88.050	2nd Place; DCA; Finalist
1979		Conquest (from Captain From Castile) * Conquistador * Celebration Suite * Night on Bald Mountain * Bull Fever	89.250	2nd Place; DCA; Finalist
1980		Malaguena * La Bamba * Celebration Suite * El Cid * Don't Cry for Me Argentina (from Evita) * Hoedown (from Rodeo)	88.950	2nd Place; DCA; Finalist
1981		Malaguena * Late in the Evening * La Fiesta * Marianne * Don't Cry for Me Argentina (from Evita) * España Cañí	85.150	5th Place; DCA; Finalist
1982		La Virgen de la Macarena * Faces * Land of Make Believe * Don't Cry for Me Argentina (from Evita) * España Cañí	87.450	4th Place; DCA; Finalist
1983		La Virgen de la Macarena * Rio * El Toro Caliente * Frankenstein * Don't Cry for Me Argentina (from Evita) * España Cañí	89.950	2nd Place; DCA; Finalist
1984		Concierto de Aranjuez * Nothing But D. Best * Malaguena * Don't Cry for Me Argentina (from Evita)	92.400	1st Place; DCA; Champion
1985		Corre Nina * Upstart * Malaguena * L.A. Is My Lady * España Cañí	92.500	1st Place; DCA; Champion
1986		Bully * Carnival * Echos * El Gato Triste * España Cañí	90.900	3rd Place; DCA; Finalist
1987		Man of La Mancha * Company (from Company) * Ritual Fire Dance * Georgetown (from St. Elmo's Fire) * España Cañí	93.240	2nd Place; DCA; Finalist
1988		Concierto de Aranjuez * Carmen * (drum solo) * Don't Cry for Me Argentina (from Evita)	91.940	5th Place; DCA; Finalist
1989		Artistry in Rhythm * Granada Smoothie * Malaga * Peanut Vendor * Reuben's Blues	93.000	3rd Place; DCA; Finalist
1990		Granada Smoothie * Maria (from West Side Story) * Malaguena	96.200	3rd Place; DCA; Finalist
1991		Pictures of Spain * Here We Are * Get On Your Feet * Echano	96.300	2nd Place; DCA; Finalist
1992		Symphonic Dance #3 - Fiesta * One More Time Chuck Corea * Don't Cry for Me Argentina (from Evita) * España Cañí	94.200	3rd Place; DCA; Finalist
1993		One Hand One Heart (from West Side Story) * Prologue (from West Side Story) * Mambo (from West Side Story) * America (from West Side Story) * Somewhere (from West Side Story)	93.200	3rd Place; DCA; Finalist
1994		Pictures of Spain * El Borojol * Concierto de Aranjuez * España Cañí	95.400	2nd Place; DCA; Finalist
1995	Spanish Fantasies	Malaguena * Conquistador * Spanish Fantasy * Concierto de Aranjuez * España Cañí	97.700	1st Place; DCA; Champion
1996	Celebration D'Oro	Entrance to Reality * Bully * Concierto de Aranjuez * Malaguena * Spanish Fantasy * Evita (from Evita) * España Cañí	96.800	2nd Place; DCA; Finalist
1997		La Virgen de la Macarena * My Spanish Heart * En Fuego	95.400	3rd Place; DCA; Finalist
1998		El Corazon de Toro * El Toro Caliente * Concierto de Aranjuez * Lateen * Malaga	95.000	3rd Place; DCA; Finalist
1999	The Mask of Zorro	The Plaza of Execution (from The Mask of Zorro) * The Legend - Zorro's Theme (from The Mask of Zorro) * The Tornado Ride (from The Mask of Zorro) * The Mask/Espana (from The Mask of Zorro)	94.500	5th Place; DCA; Finalist
2000	Fiesta de Espana	Fantasia de Espania * La Cumparsita * La Fiesta * Beautiful Maria of My Soul (from The Mambo Kings) * España Cañí	95.700	2nd Place; DCA; Finalist
2001		En Vuelo * When She Loved Me * Spain * Perfidia * España Cañí	95.350	3rd Place; DCA; Finalist
2002	1975 Muchachos	Pictures De Espana * Pines of Rome * La Fiesta * Marianne * Concierto de Aranjuez	91.150	6th Place; DCA; Finalist
2003	El Toro Nuevo	El Toro Rojo (from El Toro Nuevo) * The Prayer * El Toro Furioso (from El Toro Nuevo)	97.375	1st Place; DCA; Champion
2004	Pamplona: - Fiesta de San Fermin - The Running of the Bulls	Chupinazo y Fiesta (from Pamlona!) * San Fermin (from Pamlona!) * Encierro (from Pamlona!) * Corrida de Toros (from Pamlona!)	95.100	4th Place; DCA; Finalist
2005	Passage To The Pyramid	The River Nile (from Passage to the Pyramid) * Sandstorm (from Passage to the Pyramid) * The Riddle and Passage to the Great Pyramid (from Passage to the Pyramid)	89.688	7th Place; DCA; Finalist
2006	Reflections Through The Future!	Fuego (from Reflections Through the Future!) * Malaga * Spain * Reflections of El Toro (from Reflections Through the Future!)	95.000	4th Place; DCA; Finalist
2007	Carmen 2007		96.650	2nd Place; DCA; Finalist
2008	Sketches of Spain	El Camino Real * Spanish Fantasy * My Spanish Heart * Malaguena		
2009	Ritmos de Passion	España Cañí * Amparito Roca * Time To Say Goodbye (Con Te Parto) * El Diablo Rojo! (drum solo) * A Mis Abuelos	94.238	5th Place; DCA; Finalist
2010	Behind the Mask; Spanish Heritage	Behind The Mask	93.963	5th Place; DCA; Finalist
2011	Heritage: The Days of Future Past	Memoriam * Malaguena * Call To The Bulls	93.130	5th Place; DCA; Finalist
2012	Alegria! Shades of the Heart	Jesu, Joy of Man's Desiring * Alegria * Bolero	94.780	3rd Place; DCA; Finalist
2013	unRavel!	Bolero * Rhapsodie Espagnole * Time To Say Goodbye * Paint it Black	96.980	2nd Place; DCA; Finalist
2014	Entrapment	Seduction (from Entrapment) * Allure / Pursuit (from Entrapment) * Hypnotized (from Entrapment) * Entrapped (from Entrapment)	95.530	3rd Place; DCA; Finalist
2015	Unchained	Bound (from Unchained) * Restrained (from Unchained) * Unchained Melody * Free (from Unchained)	94.880	4th Place; DCA; Finalist
2016	Red, White & Black	Malaguena * Million Years Ago * Original Composition	94.280	4th Place; DCA; Finalist
2017	The Pathway of Remembrance	La Fiesta Mexicana * Stairway To Heaven * Zambra * La Fiesta	94.380	4th Place; DCA; Finalist
2018	DuEal	España Cani * Asturias * Original Music * Nights in White Satin * Main Theme from (Green Hornet)	91.950	6th Place; DCA; Finalist
2019	Out Of The Box	La Ruptara * Mombozart * Northern Lights * Reduce, Reuse, Recycle * Trio Saxiana * Viego Nuevo	95.200	3rd Place; DCA; Finalist
2021	At the End of the Tunnel; Arrival of the Birds / Oscillation / Milonga Del Angel / Renewal		94.650	1st Place; DCA; Champion
2022	Timeless; Romeo and Juliet Overture – Fantasy / Bad Romance / Just the Way You Are / Paradise By the Dashboard Light		97.600	2nd Place; DCA; Finalist
2023	Take Me; Destroy / Les Alertes / House of the Rising Sun / Take Me to Church / Gloria in D Minor		97.000	2nd Place; DCA; Finalist
2024	Different Strings; Roundabout / Different Strings / Dance 1 / Chin Chin / Bolero		93.825	2nd Place; All-Age; Finalist
2025	On the Edge; Danza Final (from Dances Estancia) / Everybody Hurts / Edge Of Glory		95.775	2nd Place; All-Age; Finalist
2026	Entwine; Dance of the Furies from "Orfeo ed Euridice" / Piano Concerto No. 2 in C Minor / Eating Prey / Maneater / A Nightmare to Remember		95.650	2nd Place; All-Age; Finalist
