= Taylor Scott Davis =

American church musician (born 1980)

- Born: 1980 (age 45–46)
- Education: Centenary College of Louisiana
- Occupations: Church musician; Conductor; Composer
- Organizations: St. Andrew United Methodist Church, Plano, Texas
- Website: www.taylorscottdavis.com

Taylor Scott Davis (born 1980) is an American church musician, conductor and composer of mostly sacred music. Based at St. Andrew Methodist Church in Plano, Texas, he has also become an arranger and composer for the Voces8 vocal ensemble.

== Life and career ==
Davis studied at the Centenary College of Louisiana, conducting with Julia Brasher Thorn. He graduated in 2003 as Bachelor of Sacred Music. He became a Fellow of Melodious Accord in 2004.

He has been church musician at St. Andrew Methodist Church in Plano, Texas. In 2018, he composed Return to Me, a new choral work for the Holy Week of c. 40 minutes. It follows the Stations of the Cross, with text by Terry W. York. The choir is supported by cello and piano. Music composed by Davis has been performed throughout the U.S., Europe, South Africa and South America, by groups such as Conspirare and Voces8. He has written arrangements for Voces8, for example "Joy to the World" and other Christmas carols for a 2021 video with orchestra. His arrangement was credited to feature "brassy exuberance worthy of Bernstein", new "harmonic territory", "sweeping harps", "roving bass lines" and "asymmetrical sways".

=== Stardust ===
Davis composed a motet, Stardust, for eight voices a cappella on a commission from Voces8. In 2022, the group named its tour program after the work. A reviewer of a concert at Wilhering Abbey near Linz wrote that the composition left "a lasting impression" ("nachhaltigen Eindruck"), and summarized the content: "It is about the transience of life, the disintegration into the 'meteorite dust' that gives it its title, but which true love transforms again." ("Es geht um die Vergänglichkeit des Lebens, den Zerfall in den Titel gebenden 'Meteoritenstaub', den jedoch die wahre Liebe wieder wandelt.") A reviewer of the concert at St. Martinus, Hattersheim, as part of the Rheingau Musik Festival, noted that the music created an architecture of layers of meditative foils of sound.
