= Voces8 =

British a cappella octet

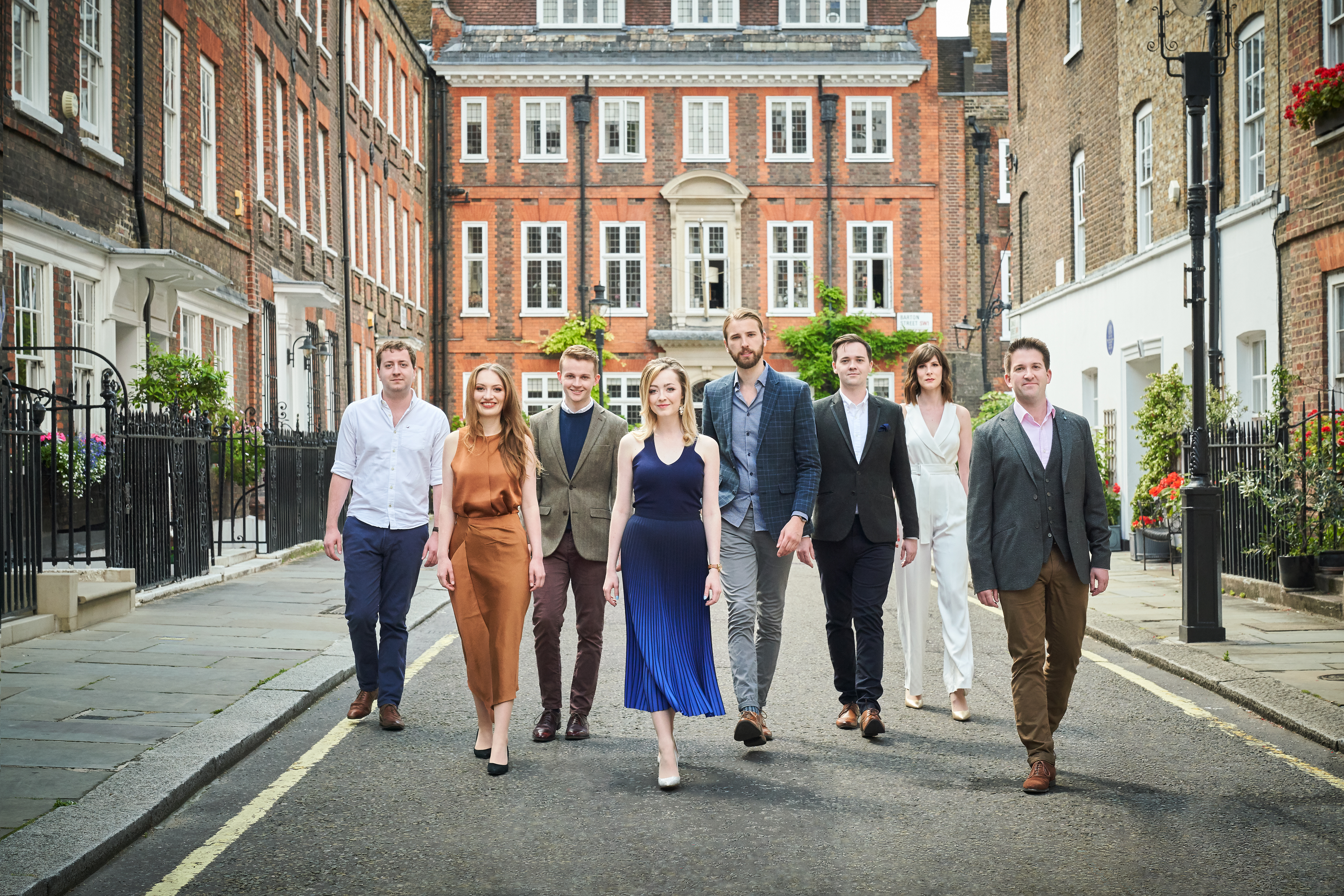
- Voces8 in 2019

Background information
- Origin: England
- Genre: A cappella music
- Years active: 2005–present
- Labels: Decca; Signum; Voces8
- Website: voces8.com

Voces8, styled VOCES8, is an a cappella octet from England. They have appeared internationally and made recordings of classical music, jazz, pop, and their own arrangements. Recent recordings are for Decca Classics and under their own label, Voces8 Records. Educational efforts are run by the Voces8 Foundation.

== History ==
VOCES8 is a British vocal ensemble originally founded in 2003 and regrouped in 2005 by brothers Paul and Barnaby Smith, both former choristers of Westminster Abbey. For most of its history, the ensemble has contained two sopranos, two countertenors, two tenors, a baritone and a bass. By 2018, one of the countertenors had been replaced by a female alto.

The ensemble has a diverse repertoire, including early English and European Renaissance music, traditional folk song, classic jazz, pop, and their own arrangements. They have appeared internationally, touring especially in Europe, Asia, and North America.

LIVE from London is an online choral festival and broadcast series founded in 2020 by VOCES8 in response to the COVID-19 pandemic, presenting professionally produced performances by vocal ensembles and artists from the United Kingdom and internationally, with selected participants including The Tallis Scholars, VOCES8, Take 6, I Fagiolini, London Adventist Chorale, ANÚNA, amarcord, The Aeolians, Apollo5, The King's Singers, and Stile Antico.

VOCES8 has commissioned new works from composers such as Ēriks Ešenvalds, Ola Gjeilo, Jonathan Dove, Jocelyn Hagen, Ken Burton, Roderick Williams, Alexander Levine, Roxanna Panufnik, Mårten Jansson, Ben Parry, and Christopher Tin. Jim Clements is their arranger-in-residence.

The octet won the Limelight International Artist of the Year: People's Choice award at the 2021 Limelight Awards.

Their 2022 tour programme was called Stardust, after a composition commissioned from Taylor Scott Davis.

At the 65th Annual Grammy Awards in 2023, Voces8 was nominated for Best Classical Compendium for its recording of The Lost Birds by Christopher Tin.

In June 2025, VOCES8 marked its twentieth anniversary with an official anniversary concert at the Barbican Centre on 8 June, joined by the VOCES8 Scholars, former members of the ensemble, and the BBC Singers. Reviewing the concert, The Guardian noted the participation of alumni, apprentices, violinist Jack Liebeck and the BBC Singers, and described the event as a celebratory twentieth-anniversary performance.

In March 2026, VOCES8 announced that first tenor Blake Morgan would transition into the role of VOCES8 Ambassador and Associate Artist from the 2026-27 season, and that the ensemble would begin a search for a new singer to fill the tenor seat.

In 2026, Voces8's recording of Revolutions by ensemble co-founder Paul Smith won the Opus Klassik award for Choral Recording of the Year.

== Members ==
=== Current ===
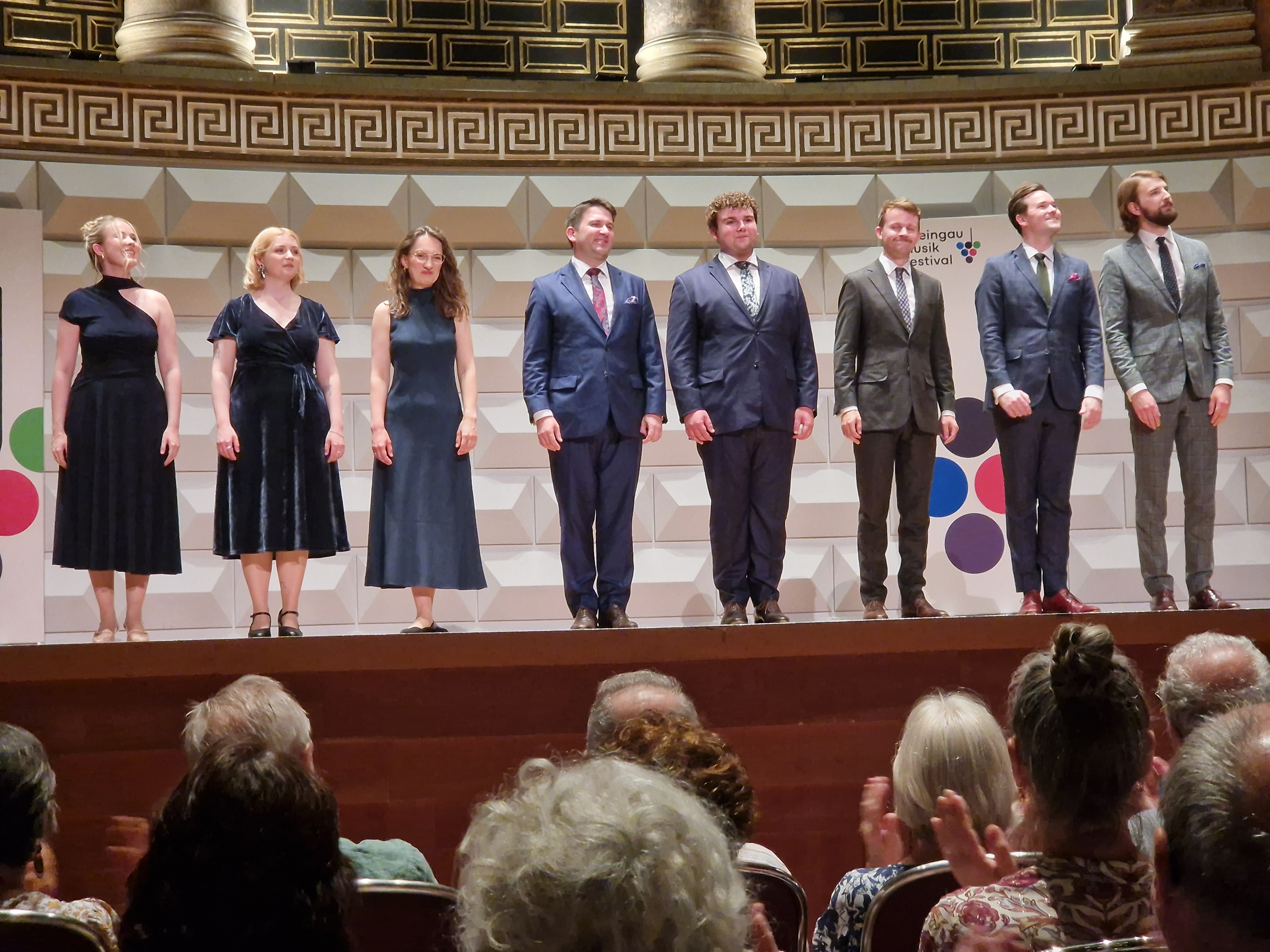
Voces8 in a joint concert with Chanticleer for the Rheingau Musik Festival, June 2026

Current members are as follows:

- Savannah Porter – First soprano (2025–present)
- Virginia Grabovsky – Second soprano (2026–present)
- Katie Jeffries-Harris – First alto (2018–present)
- Barnaby Smith – Second alto/countertenor and Artistic Director (2005–present)
- Riley Eddins – First tenor (2026–present)
- Euan Williamson – Second tenor (2019–present)
- Chris Moore – Baritone (2018–present)
- Dominic Carver – Bass (2022–present)

=== Former ===
The ensemble's former members are:

- Rachel Major – First soprano (2005–2008)
- Andrea Haines – First soprano (2008–2025)
- Catherine Backhouse – Second soprano (2005–2009)
- Emily Dickens – Second soprano (2009–2017)
- Eleonore Cockerham – Second soprano (2017–2021)
- Molly Noon – Second soprano (2021–2024)
- Eleonora Poignant – Second soprano (2025–2026)
- Daniel Keating-Roberts – First countertenor (2005–2007)
- Chris Wardle – First countertenor (2007–2018)
- Charles MacDougall – First tenor (2005–2012)
- Oliver Vincent – First tenor (2012–2016)
- Blake Morgan – First tenor (2016–2026)
- Thomas Elwin – Second tenor (2005–2006)
- Robin Bailey – Second tenor (2006–2009)
- Robert Mingay Smith – Second tenor (2009–2013)
- Sam Dressel – Second tenor (2013–2019)
- Paul Smith – Baritone and founder (2005–2016)
- Rob Clark – Baritone (2016–2018)
- Simon Whiteley – Bass (2005)
- Greg Hallam – Bass (2006)
- Dingle Yandell – Bass (2006–2015)
- Jonathan Pacey – Bass (2015–2022)

== Lineup ==
Period	First Soprano	Second Soprano	First Alto/Countertenor	Second Alto/Countertenor	First Tenor	Second Tenor	Baritone	Bass
2005–2006	Rachel Major	Catherine Backhouse	Daniel Keating-Roberts	Barnaby Smith	Charles MacDougall	Thomas Elwin	Paul Smith	Simon Whiteley
2006–2007	Rachel Major	Catherine Backhouse	Daniel Keating-Roberts	Barnaby Smith	Charles MacDougall	Robin Bailey	Paul Smith	Greg Hallam
2007–2008	Rachel Major	Catherine Backhouse	Chris Wardle	Barnaby Smith	Charles MacDougall	Robin Bailey	Paul Smith	Dingle Yandell
2008–2009	Andrea Haines	Catherine Backhouse	Chris Wardle	Barnaby Smith	Charles MacDougall	Robin Bailey	Paul Smith	Dingle Yandell
2009–2012	Andrea Haines	Emily Dickens	Chris Wardle	Barnaby Smith	Charles MacDougall	Robert Smith	Paul Smith	Dingle Yandell
2012–2013	Andrea Haines	Emily Dickens	Chris Wardle	Barnaby Smith	Oliver Vincent	Robert Smith	Paul Smith	Dingle Yandell
2013–2015	Andrea Haines	Emily Dickens	Chris Wardle	Barnaby Smith	Oliver Vincent	Sam Dressel	Paul Smith	Dingle Yandell
2015–2016	Andrea Haines	Emily Dickens	Chris Wardle	Barnaby Smith	Oliver Vincent	Sam Dressel	Paul Smith	Jonathan Pacey
2016–2017	Andrea Haines	Emily Dickens	Chris Wardle	Barnaby Smith	Blake Morgan	Sam Dressel	Rob Clark	Jonathan Pacey
2017–2018	Andrea Haines	Eleonore Cockerham	Chris Wardle	Barnaby Smith	Blake Morgan	Sam Dressel	Rob Clark	Jonathan Pacey
2018–2019	Andrea Haines	Eleonore Cockerham	Katie Jeffries-Harris	Barnaby Smith	Blake Morgan	Sam Dressel	Chris Moore	Jonathan Pacey
2019–2021	Andrea Haines	Eleonore Cockerham	Katie Jeffries-Harris	Barnaby Smith	Blake Morgan	Euan Williamson	Chris Moore	Jonathan Pacey
2021–2022	Andrea Haines	Molly Noon	Katie Jeffries-Harris	Barnaby Smith	Blake Morgan	Euan Williamson	Chris Moore	Jonathan Pacey
2022–2024	Andrea Haines	Molly Noon	Katie Jeffries-Harris	Barnaby Smith	Blake Morgan	Euan Williamson	Chris Moore	Dominic Carver
2025–2026	Savannah Porter	Eleonora Poignant	Katie Jeffries-Harris	Barnaby Smith	Blake Morgan	Euan Williamson	Chris Moore	Dominic Carver
2026-present	Savannah Porter	Virginia Grabovsky	Katie Jeffries-Harris	Barnaby Smith	Riley Eddins	Euan Williamson	Chris Moore	Dominic Carver

== VOCES8 Foundation ==
The VOCES8 Foundation (formerly VCM Foundation) is a UK-registered charity, set up by VOCES8 founder members Paul and Barnaby Smith in 2006 to develop the ensemble's music education and outreach programmes. Awarded a Classic FM (UK) Public Choice Award at the 2020 Music & Drama Education Awards, the charity works across choral and small vocal ensemble performance and education and is based at the VOCES8 Centre at St Anne and St Agnes Church in the City of London.

=== Performance ===
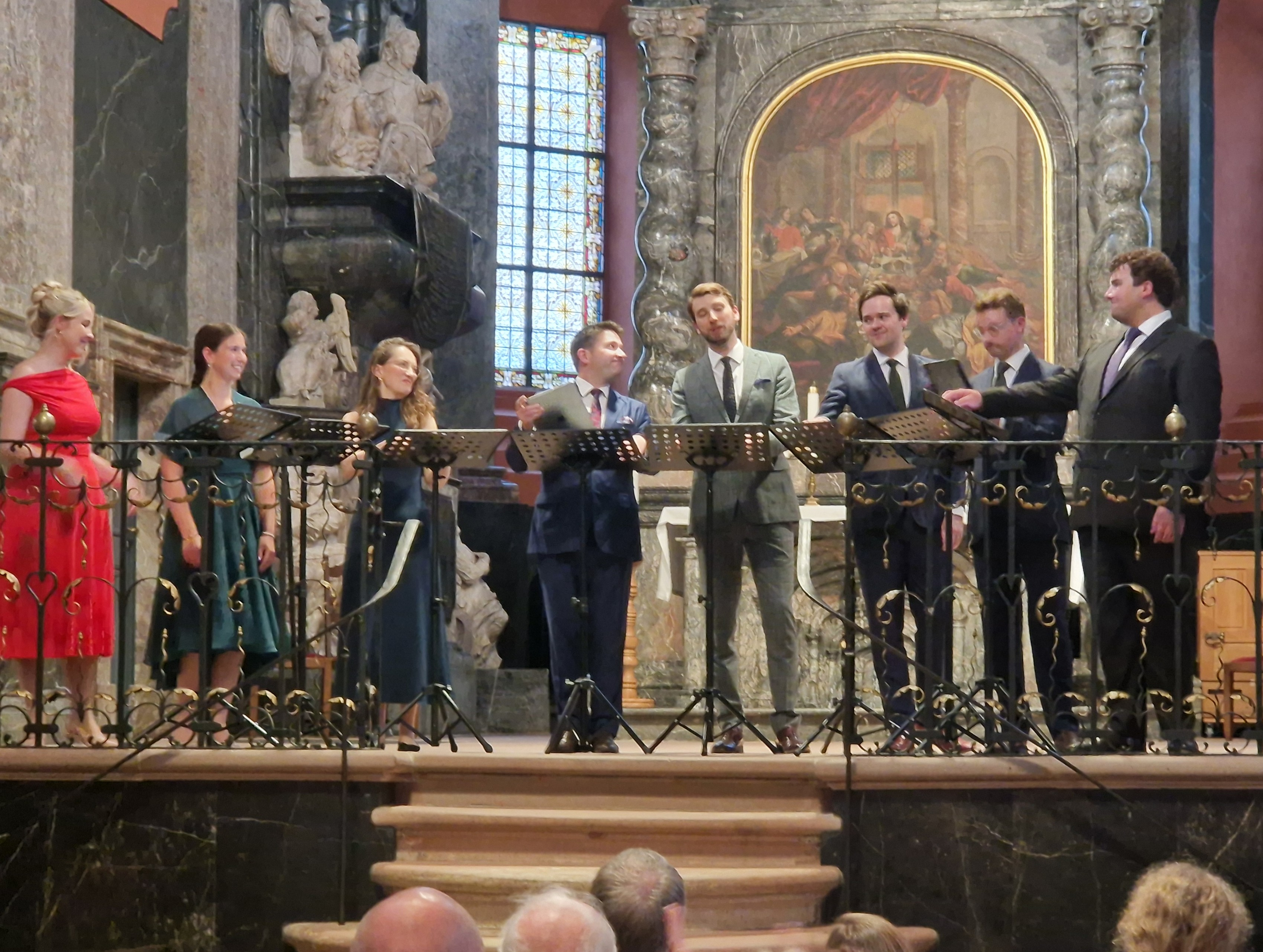
Voces8 in concert at Unionskirche, Idstein as part of the Rheingau Musik Festival, 8 August 2026

Foundation artists perform around 200 concerts each year, including through online/livestreaming. In 2026, Voces8 were artists in residence of the Rheingau Musik Festival.

=== Education ===
Foundation artists reach up to 40,000 people a year in regular workshops and masterclasses with Music Hubs, schools and community groups. In 2015 the ensemble launched the VOCES8 Scholars Programme which provides training in performing, recording and workshop leading for 20 young singers with an interest in choral singing in the UK and USA.

In 2020 during the COVID-19 pandemic they launched the VOCES8 Digital Academy featuring tutorials, exercises, learning and performing tracks and videos.

== Discography ==
The group has recorded with Decca, Signum, and their own Voces8 Records label. As part of their 15th anniversary celebrations in 2020, the group released their project After Silence, consisting of four digital EPs.

=== Albums ===
- Aces High (2010, Signum)
- Bach's Motets, with the Senesino Players (2010)
- Brahms, Bruckner, Reger (2011)
- In the Beginning (2012)
- Christmas (2012, Signum)
- A Choral Tapestry (2012, Signum)
- Where I Sleep (2014, Decca)
- Eventide (2014, Decca)
- Lux (2015, Decca)
- Winter (2016, Decca)
- Equinox (2018)
- Enchanted Isle (2019)
- After Silence (2020, Voces8 Records)
- Infinity (2021, Decca)
- Nightfall (2024)
- Twenty (2025)

=== EPs ===
- Voces8 EP (2019)

=== Collaborations ===
- A Capella Collection (2012, Signum) – with other groups, marking 15 years of Signum Records
- Choral Collection (2012, Signum) – same
- Early Music Collection (2012, Signum) – same
- A Purcell Collection (2014, Signum) – by Voces8 and Les Inventions
- Psalms (2015, Signum) – works by Benedetto Marcello, Voces8 and Les Inventions
- Ola Gjeilo (2018, Decca) – works by Ola Gjeilo and Voces8
- Home Is (2018) – by Jacob Collier and Voces8
- Requiem Novum (2022) – by Mårten Jansson, Voces8, Apollo5, and the Philharmonia Orchestra
- The Lost Birds (2022) – by Christopher Tin, Voces8 and the Royal Philharmonic Orchestra
- Home (2023) – with Eric Whitacre
- Seven Psalms (2023) – with Paul Simon

== Music books ==
- A Cappella Songbook (2012, paperback) ISMN 9790577001784
- A Cappella Songbook 2 (2018, paperback) ISMN 9790577007779
