= Lux Aurumque =

Choral composition by Eric Whitacre

- by Eric Whitacre
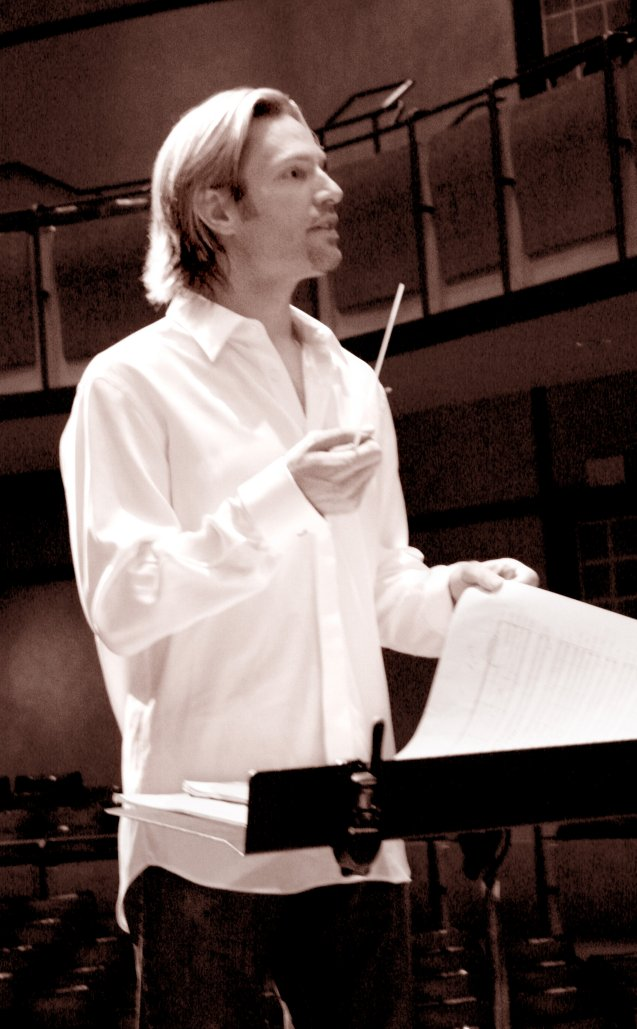
- The composer conducting, in 2007
- Key: C♯ minor
- Genre: choral composition
- Text: Translation of the poem "Light and Gold", by Edward Esch
- Language: Latin
- Composed: 2000
- Scoring: 8-part mixed choir a cappella

Lux Aurumque ("Light and Gold", sometimes "Light of Gold") is a choral composition in one movement by Eric Whitacre. It is a Christmas piece based on a Latin poem of the same name, which translates as "Light, warm and heavy as pure gold, and the angels sing softly to the new born babe". In 2000, Whitacre set a short Latin text for mixed choir a cappella. In 2005, he wrote an arrangement for wind ensemble. The choral version became known through Whitacre's project Virtual Choir in 2009. The piece is also available for men's choir. A performance takes about four minutes.

== History ==
The inspiration for the work was a short poem in English, "Light and Gold", which begins with the word "Light" and ends "angels sing softly to the new-born babe". Charles Anthony Silvestri translated this text into Latin for Whitacre, and attempted to render "the original poem into Latin as singably and as sonically beautifully as I could". The poem is attributed to Edward Esch, described by Whitacre as "a recluse, in the truest sense of the word … born sometime in the early '70s, but rarely making a public appearance". Esch is also credited with the words of Whitacre's work Winter. It has been suggested that Esch is a pseudonym of Eric Whitacre, whose son is named Esch Edward Whitacre.

The piece was composed in 2000 on a commission from the Master Chorale of Tampa Bay and dedicated to Jo-Michael Scheibe. It was published by Walton Music in 2001. In 2005, Whitacre adapted it for wind band, a version first performed at the annual conference of the Texas Music Educators Association and dedicated to Gary Green. He also arranged it for men's choir.

The version for mixed choir is part of Whitacre's project Virtual Choir. The video as a mix of individual recordings by 185 singers from 12 countries caused "a colossal on-line rush in interest" when it was uploaded in 2011. It had been viewed on YouTube more than 6.7 million times as of December 2021.

== Music ==
The work in 48 measures is written in C♯ minor and marked Adagio, Molto legato. It is set for SATB; all parts are divided in two for most of the time, a solo soprano is employed in measures 5 to 7, and the soprano is divided in three parts beginning in measure 34.

The composer writes in the printed score: "... if the tight harmonies are carefully tuned and balanced they will shimmer and glow". Differently from other works of the composer, the piece is suitable for church services, especially for Christmas. Whitacre's music has been described as "softly spoken, deeply harmonic and tuneful, but making use of unusual rhythms and sound balancing to create highly textured music".

Whitacre used the two initial chords of the conclusion of Passio by Estonian composer Arvo Pärt (Qui passus es) for the final word natum (new-born) and thus linking birth and death of Christ to the resurrection.
