= List of poems by Robert Frost =

Reluctance

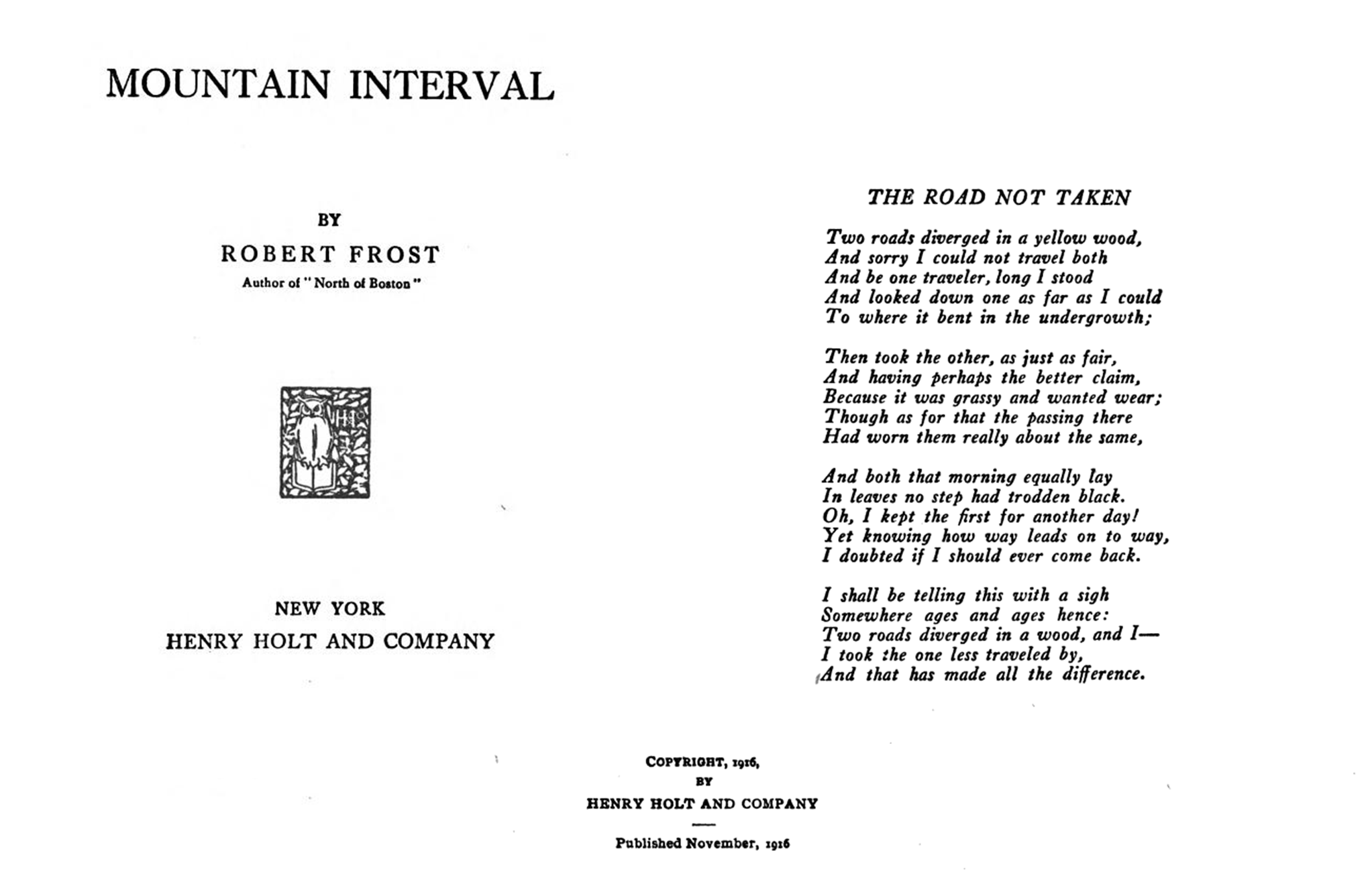
Cover of Mountain Interval, copyright page, and page containing the poem "The Road Not Taken", by Robert Frost

The following is a list of poems by Robert Frost. Robert Frost was an American poet, and the recipient of four Pulitzer Prizes for poetry.

== Collections ==
=== A Boy's Will (1913) ===
1. "Into My Own"
2. "Ghost House"
3. "My November Guest"
4. "Love and a Question"
5. "A Late Walk
6. "Stars"
7. "Storm Fear"
8. "Wind and Window Flower"
9. "To the Thawing Wind"
10. "A Prayer in Spring"
11. "Flower-gathering"
12. "Rose Pogonias"
13. "Asking for Roses"
14. "Waiting Afield at Dusk"
15. "In a Vale"
16. "A Dream Pang"
17. "In Neglect"
18. "The Vantage Point"
19. "Mowing"
20. "Going for Water"
21. "Revelation"
22. "The Trial by Existence"
23. "In Equal Sacrifice"
24. "The Tuft of Flowers"
25. "Spoils of the Dead"
26. "Pan with Us"
27. "The Demiurge's Laugh"
28. "Now Close the Windows"
29. "A Line-storm Song"
30. "October"
31. "My Butterfly
32. "Reluctance"

=== North of Boston (1914) ===
1. "The Pasture"
2. "Mending Wall"
3. "The Death of the Hired Man"
4. "The Mountain"
5. "A Hundred Collars"
6. "Home Burial"
7. "The Black Cottage"
8. "Blueberries"
9. "A Servant to Servants"
10. "After Apple-Picking"
11. "The Code"
12. "The Generations of Men"
13. "The Housekeeper"
14. "The Fear"
15. "The Self-seeker"
16. "The Wood-pile"
17. "Good Hours"

=== Mountain Interval (1916) ===
The following list is compiled from the revised 1920 edition:

1. "The Road Not Taken"
2. "Christmas Trees"
3. "An Old Man's Winter Night"
4. "The Exposed Nest"
5. "A Patch of Old Snow"
6. "In the Home Stretch"
7. "The Telephone"
8. "Meeting and Passing"
9. "Hyla Brook"
10. "The Oven Bird"
11. "Bond and Free"
12. "Birches"
13. "Pea Brush"
14. "Putting in the Seed"
15. "A Time to Talk"
16. "The Cow in Apple Time"
17. "An Encounter"
18. "Range-Finding"
19. "Cranberries at Noon"
20. "The Hill Wife"
21. "The Bonfire"
22. "A Girl's Garden"
23. "Locked Out"
24. "The Last Word of a Blue Bird"
25. "Out, Out-"
26. "Brown's Descent, or the Willy-nilly Slide"
27. "The Gum-Gatherer"
28. "The Line-Gang"
29. "The Vanishing Red"
30. "Snow"
31. "The Sound of Trees"

=== New Hampshire (1923) ===
- Stopping by Woods on a Snowy Evening
- Fire and Ice
- The Aim Was Song
- The Need of Being Versed in Country Things
- The Moon
- I Will Sing You One
- Paul's Wife
- For Once, Then, Something
- The Onset
- Two Look at Two
- Nothing Gold Can Stay
- New Hampshire
- Misgiving
- A Boundless Moment
- The Axe-Helve
- The Grind-Stone
- The Witch of Coos
- The Pauper Witch of Grafton
- A Star In A Stone Boat
- The Star Splitter
- In A Disused Graveyard
- Fragmentary Blue
- A Brook in the City
- On a Tree Fallen Across the Road (To Hear Us Talk)
- Gathering Leaves
- To Earthward

=== West-Running Brook (1928) ===
1. "Spring Pools"
2. "The Freedom of the Moon"
3. "The Rose Family"
4. "Fireflies in the Garden"
5. "Atmosphere"
6. "Devotion"
7. "On Going Unnoticed"
8. "The Cocoon"
9. "A Passing Glimpse"
10. "A Peck of Gold"
11. "Acceptance"
12. "Once by the Pacific"
13. "Lodged"
14. "A Minor Bird"
15. "Bereft"
16. "Tree at My Window"
17. "The Peaceful Shepherd"
18. "The Thatch"
19. "A Winter Eden"
20. "The Flood"
21. "Acquainted with the Night"
22. "The Lovely Shall Be Choosers"
23. "West-Running Brook"
24. "Sand Dunes"
25. "Canis Major"
26. "A Soldier"
27. "Immigrants"
28. "Hannibal"
29. "The Flower Boat"
30. "The Times Table"
31. "The Investment"
32. "The Last Mowing"
33. "The Birthplace"
34. "The Door in the Dark"
35. "Dust in the Eyes"
36. "Sitting by a Bush in Broad Sunlight"
37. "The Armful"
38. "What Fifty Said"
39. "Riders"
40. "On Looking Up by Chance at the Constellations"
41. "The Bear"
42. "The Egg and the Machine"

=== A Further Range (1937) ===
1. "Taken Doubly"
  1. "A Lone Striker"
  2. "Two Tramps in Mud Time"
  3. "The White-Tailed Hornet"
  4. "A Blue Ribbon at Amesbury"
  5. "A Drumlin Woodchuck"
  6. "The Gold Hesperidee"
  7. "In Time of Cloudburst"
  8. "A Roadside Stand"
  9. "Departmental"
  10. "The Old Barn at the Bottom of the Fogs"
  11. "On the Heart's Beginning to Cloud the Mind"
  12. "The Figure in the Doorway"
  13. "At Woodward's Gardens"
  14. "A Record Stride"
2. "Taken Singly"
  1. "Lost in Heaven"
  2. "Desert Places"
  3. "Leaves Compared with Flowers"
  4. "A Leaf Treader"
  5. "On Taking from the Top to Broaden the Base"
  6. "They Were Welcome to Their Belief"
  7. "The Strong Are Saying Nothing"
  8. "The Master Speed"
  9. "Moon Compasses"
  10. "Neither Out Far nor in Deep"
  11. "Voice Ways"
  12. "Design"
  13. "On a Bird Winging in its Sleep"
  14. "After-Flakes"
  15. "Clear and Colder"
  16. "Unharvested"
  17. "There Are Roughly Zones"
  18. "A Trial Run"
  19. "Not Quite Social"
  20. "Provide, Provide"
3. "Ten mills"
  1. "Precaution"
  2. "The Span of Life"
  3. "The Wrights' Biplane"
  4. "Assertive"
  5. "Evil Tendencies Cancel"
  6. "Pertinax"
  7. "Waspish"
  8. "One Guess"
  9. "The Hardship of Accounting"
  10. "Not All There"
  11. "In Divés' Dive"
4. "The Outlands"
  1. "The Vindictives"
  2. "The Andes"
  3. "The Bearer of Evil Tidings"
  4. "The Himalayas"
  5. "Iris by Night"
  6. "The Malverns"
5. "Build Soil"
  1. "Build Soil"
  2. "To a Thinker"
6. "A Missive Missile"

=== A Witness Tree (1942) ===
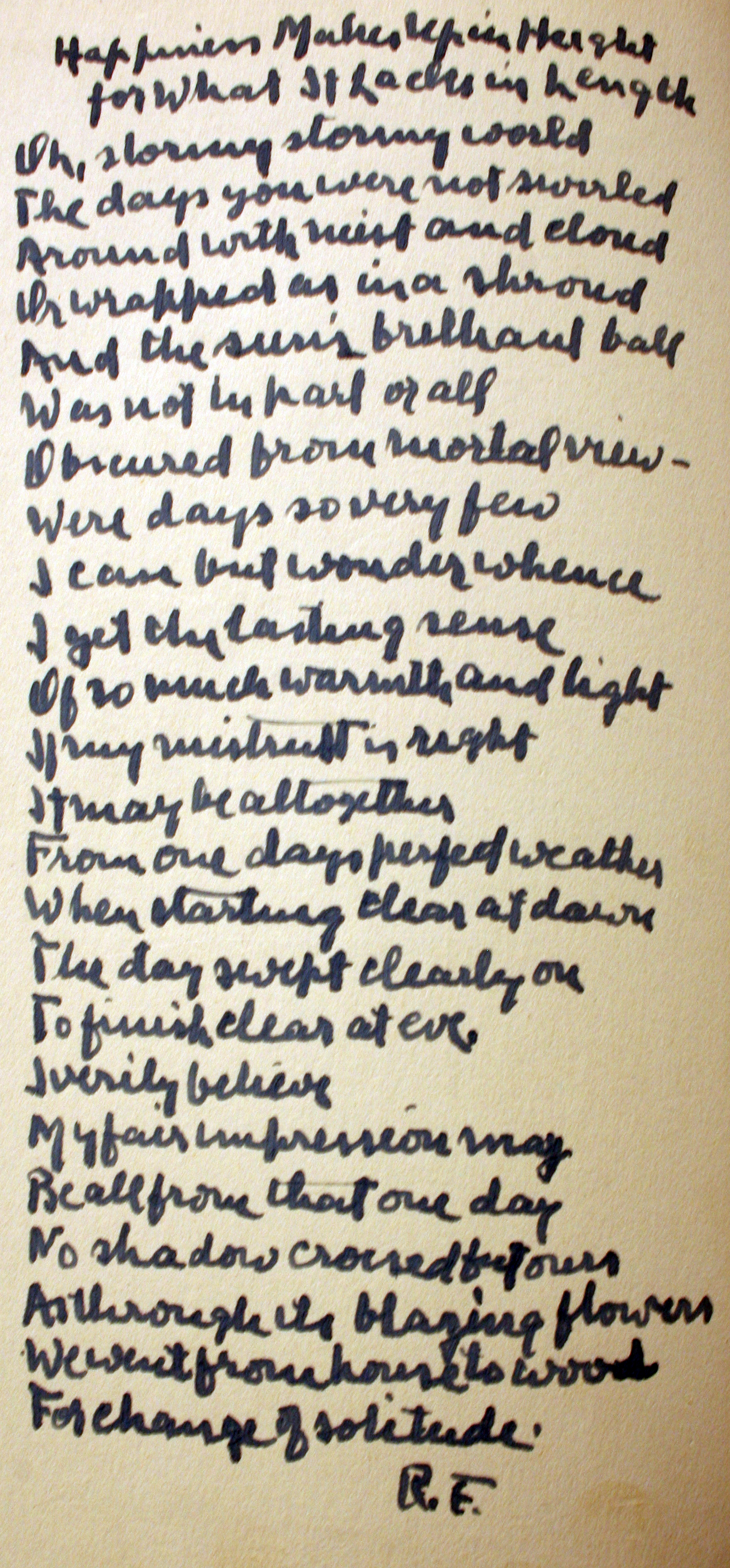
Handwritten version of 'Happiness Makes Up in Height For What It Lacks in Length' by Robert Frost. Found inscribed in a Robert Frost book in the Special Collections Library at Duke University. Date of signature in the book predates formal release in publication of the poem.

- The Gift Outright
- The Most of It
- Come In
- All Revelation
- A Considerable Speck
- The Silken Tent
- Happiness Makes Up In Height For What It Lacks In Length
- The Subverted Flower
- The Lesson for Today
- The Discovery of the Madeiras
- Of the Stones of the Place
- Never Again Would Birds' Song Be the Same
- To A Moth Seen In Winter

=== In the Clearing (1962) ===
- Pod of the Milkweed
- Away!
- A Cabin in the Clearing
- Closed for Good
- America is Hard to See
- One More Brevity
- Escapist—Never
- For John F. Kennedy His Inauguration
- Accidentally on Purpose
- A Never Naught Song
- Version
- A Concept Self-Conceived
- Forgive O, Lord
- Kitty Hawk
- Auspex
- The Draft Horse
- Ends
- Peril of Hope
- Questioning Faces
- Does No One at All Ever Feel This Way in the Least?
- The Bad Island—Easter
- Our Doom to Bloom
- The Objection to Being Stepped on
- A Wishing Well
- How Hard Is It to Keep from Being King When It's in You and in the Situation
- Lines Written in Dejection on the Eve of a Great Success
- The Milky Way Is a Cowpath
- Some Science Fiction
- Quandary
- A Reflex
- In a Glass of Cider
- From Iron
- Four-Room Shack
- But Outer Space
- On Being Chosen Poet of Vermont
- We Vainly Wrestle
- It Takes All Sorts
- In Winter in the Woods

=== Steeple Bush (1947) ===
- Directive
- Skeptic
- Etherealizing
- Why Wait for Science
- An Unstamped Letter in Our Rural Letter Box (1944).

=== An Afterword ===
- Choose Something Like a Star
- Dust of snow
