= Collected Poems of Robert Frost =

Poetry collection

1930 first edition, fourth printing.

Collected Poems of Robert Frost is a collection of poetry written by Robert Frost and published in 1930 by Henry Holt and Company in New York.

== Contents ==
The collection consisted of Robert Frost's first five poetry books:

- A Boy's Will (1913);
- North of Boston (1914);
- Mountain Interval (1916);
- New Hampshire (1923); and,
- West-Running Brook (1928).

== Reception ==
Frost received a Pulitzer Prize in 1931 for the collection. One of the books in the collection, New Hampshire, had received the Pulitzer Prize in 1924.

A special edition was printed after the book won the Pulitzer Prize with a red band around the front and back covers. The front cover banner read: "Pulitzer Prize Poems: 1930: This edition contains Mr. Frost's complete work to date; including six poems never hitherto published and New Hampshire, for which he was awarded the Pulitzer Prize in 1923." The back cover banner featured a quote from Hugh Walpole: "More sure of immortality than any book published in the last five years." The frontispiece featured a photograph of the author with his signature under it.
