= Nothing Gold Can Stay =

Nothing Gold Can Stay may refer to:

- "Nothing Gold Can Stay" (poem), a poem by American poet Robert Frost
- Nothing Gold Can Stay (album), a 1999 album by New Found Glory
- Nothing Gold Can Stay (short story collection), a 2013 short story collection by Ron Rash
- Episode 11 of Containment (TV series) in 2016, named after the Frost poem
- Nothing Gold Can Stay (TV series), a 2017 Chinese television series
