= Mending Wall =

1914 poem by Robert Frost

- by Robert Frost
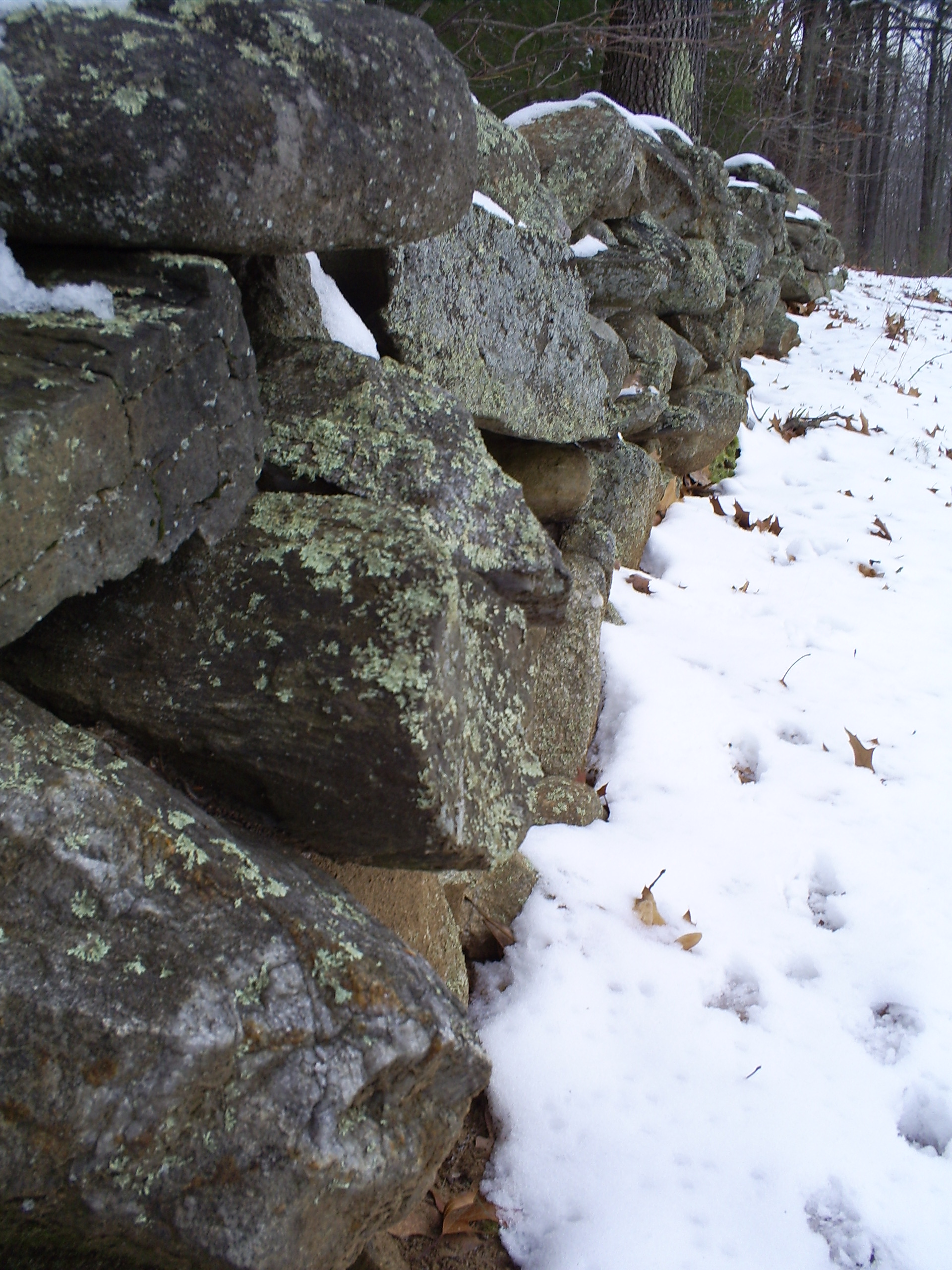
- The stone wall at Frost's farm in Derry, New Hampshire, which he describes in "Mending Wall"
- First published in: North of Boston
- Country: England
- Language: English
- Publisher: David Nutt
- Publication date: 1914

Full text
- North of Boston/Mending Wall at Wikisource

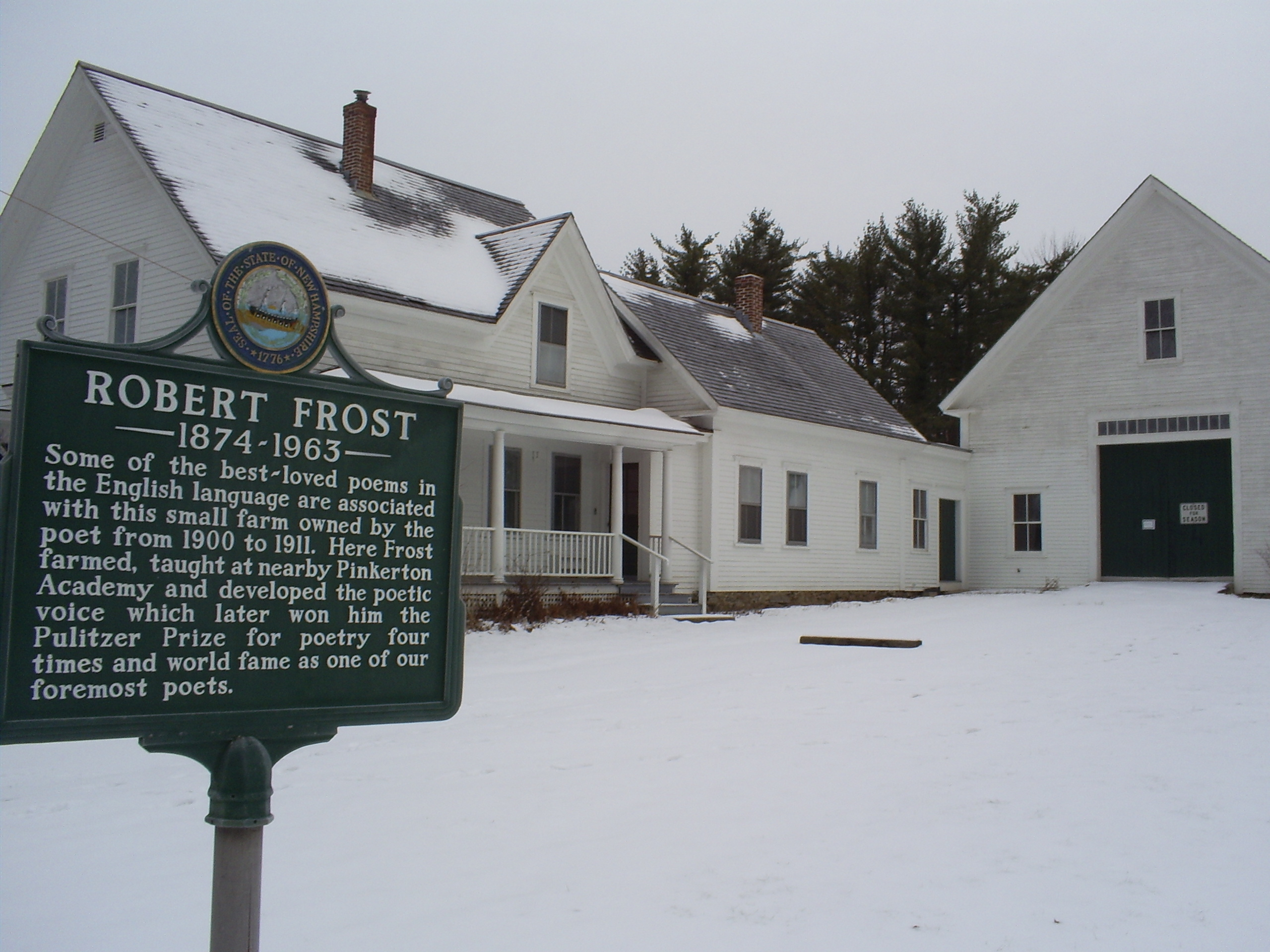
Frost composed the poem at his farm in Derry, New Hampshire; his home from 1901 to 1911

"Mending Wall" is a poem by Robert Frost. It opens Frost's second collection of poetry, North of Boston, published in 1914 by David Nutt, and has become "one of the most anthologized and analyzed poems in modern literature".

== Background ==
Like many of the poems in North of Boston, "Mending Wall" narrates a story drawn from rural New England. The narrator, a New England farmer, contacts his neighbor in the spring to rebuild the stone wall between their two farms. As the men work, the narrator questions the purpose of a wall "where it is we do not need the wall" (23). He notes twice in the poem that "something there is that doesn’t love a wall" (1, 35), but his neighbor replies twice with the proverb, "Good fences make good neighbors" (27, 45).

== Themes ==
Despite its simple, almost folksy, language, "Mending Wall" is a complex poem with several themes, beginning with human fellowship, which Frost first dealt with in his poem "The Tuft of Flowers" in his first collection of poems, A Boy's Will.

Unlike the earlier poem, which explores the bond between men, "Mending Wall" deals with the distances and tensions between men. The poem considers the contradictions in life and humanity, including the contradictions within each person, as man "makes boundaries and he breaks boundaries". It also examines the role of boundaries in human society, as mending the wall serves both to separate and to join the two neighbors, another contradiction.

"Mending Wall" also plays with the theme of seasons as recurring cycles in life, and contrasts those cycles with both physical and language parallelism as the men walk along the wall, each to a side, and their language stays each to a side. Frost further meditates on the role of language as a kind of wall that both joins and separates people.

Finally, Frost explores the theme of mischief and humor, as the narrator says halfway through the poem, "Spring is the mischief in me, and I wonder/If I could put a notion in his head" (28, 29). Mending the wall is a game for the narrator but in contrast, the neighbor seems quite serious about the work. The narrator notes how the neighbor seems to be walking not only in the thick shade of woods and trees but in actual "darkness", implying ignorance or inhospitable sentiments or both.

== Usage ==
Noted philosopher and politician Onora O'Neill uses the poem to preface her book Justice Across Boundaries: Whose Obligations? (2016).
