= Like a Star (disambiguation) =

"Like a Star" is a song by Corinne Bailey Rae.

Like a Star may also refer to:

- "Like a Star", a song by Britt Nicole from The Lost Get Found
- "Like a Star", a song by Reks from Rhythmatic Eternal King Supreme

== See also ==
- "She's like a Star", a 2008 song by Taio Cruz
- Choose Something Like a Star (disambiguation)
