= Desert Places =

Poem by Robert Frost

"Desert Places" is a poem by Robert Frost. It was originally written in 1933 and appeared in The American Mercury in April 1934, before being collected in Frost's 1936 book A Further Range. The book was awarded the Pulitzer Prize in 1937.

== Background ==
Frost composed the poem in the winter of 1933 during bouts of illness and depression. It is one of the poems Frost claims to have written "without fumbling a sentence."

== Analysis ==
=== Themes and tone ===
The poem is considered one of Frost's darker and more somber poems, focusing on the terrifying nature of existence. Additional themes are ones of loneliness, fear, and despair. The poem opens with the speaker passing by an empty field during a snowstorm around dusk. As the field is covered with snow, the speaker contemplates the blankness and the whiteness of the snow, a snow "with no expression, nothing to express." The speaker then turns his contemplation to the night sky "with their empty spaces / Between stars." The poem shares a similar landscape to Frost's poem "Stopping By Woods on a Snowy Evening." The Irish poet Seamus Heaney notes in his essay "Above the Brim" that the two poems also share a similar rhyme scheme. Heaney also notes that the quick alliteration in the first two lines propel the poem forward.

=== Critical interpretation ===
Critics differ on whether or not the poem expresses an argument for faith and God or an argument for skepticism. Cleanth Brooks and Robert Penn Warren, in their book Understanding Poetry, interpret the poem to speak on behalf of faith and belief. Other critics believe the poem embodies the skepticism evident within the New England tradition of Nathaniel Hawthorne. Still others view the poem as more modern and ironic in its approach, comparing the poem to the tradition of William Wordsworth. Most critics agree, however, that Frost establishes a mirroring between the exterior landscape and the interior landscape of the speaker. More recent critics have argued that the poem expresses Frost's lack of faith in his own creative abilities, noting that the lonely and barren landscape mirrors the barrenness of creativity, inspiration, and imagination. Critic Judith Oster, for example, correlates the line "nothing to express" with Frost's own fear of a loss of creative output.
