= The Need of Being Versed in Country Things =

1923 poem by Robert Frost

The Need of Being Versed in Country Things is a poem by Robert Frost. It was published in 1923 in his New Hampshire poetry collection. The poem contains six quatrains with an ABCB rhyme scheme.

== Text ==
The house had gone to bring again
To the midnight sky a sunset glow.
Now the chimney was all of the house that stood,
Like a pistil after the petals go.

The barn opposed across the way,
That would have joined the house in flame
Had it been the will of the wind, was left
To bear forsaken the place's name.

No more it opened with all one end
For teams that came by the stony road
To drum on the floor with scurrying hoofs
And brush the mow with the summer load.

The birds that came to it through the air
At broken windows flew out and in,
Their murmur more like the sigh we sigh
From too much dwelling on what has been.

Yet for them the lilac renewed its leaf,
And the aged elm, though touched with fire;
And the dry pump flung up an awkward arm;
And the fence post carried a strand of wire.

For them there was really nothing sad.
But though they rejoiced in the nest they kept,
One had to be versed in country things
Not to believe the phoebes wept.

== Analysis ==
The first quatrain paints the picture of a burnt down house, its only remnant the stone chimney. The narrator imagines the fire that consumed the house (a human artifice) as appearing like a sunset (a natural phenomenon) from afar. The narrator also imagines the chimney (a human artifice) as a flower that has dropped its petals (a natural phenomenon).

The second quatrain introduces the reader to the adjacent barn left untouched by the fire. The narrator talks about how, if the wind had been blowing in a different direction, the barn would have burned down as well. However, the narrator does not leave the wind's direction to natural phenomena. Instead, the narrator imbues the wind with will, suggesting that the wind could have caused the barn to burn down if it had wanted to. This humanization of the wind launches the narrator down a path of imagination and sentimentality.

The third quatrain shows the melancholy the narrator is feeling about the barn no longer functioning like it used to. The narrator evokes a fictionalized memory of the clatter of sweaty horse teams entering a flung-open barn door under the hands of the defunct house's human inhabitants. For a moment, the narrator is overcome by nostalgia for the time before the farm had been "emptied of human activity."

The fourth quatrain tells of the birds now flying in and out of the barn through its broken windows, using it as shelter. The phoebes' soft comings and goings contrast starkly with the ruckus evoked in the third stanza. The narrator likens the sound of the phoebes' flapping wings to the human sigh; but here starts to emerge from the daydream. The narrator notes that the sigh comes from humans "too much dwelling on" (with "dwelling" having double entendre) what no longer exists. (Note: It has been suggested that the structure in question in this stanza is not the barn but the house. This seems to be an impossibility, however, given that, as stated in the first stanza, the chimney is the only part of the house remaining.)

In the fifth quatrain, the narrator further admits to and moves away from sentimentality. This stanza reveals to the reader that the fire was something that happened long ago, and this sense of time passing is Frost's crucial point. He differentiates between "kinds of memory: it is only the human mind, he suggests, that is capable of the enormous leap backwards in time. The curse of human memory is that it alone is capable of recalling a past that can never return, that has been destroyed utterly and irrevocably by the fire. ‘Bird-memory' has little grasp of a human past. Human beings flash across the scene of bird-awareness but (blessedly) the grooves of impression are rarely made: only the larger features of a scene and the broad patterns of seasonal change are retained. The phoebes belong to a separate order of reality." All they grasp is that it is once again spring, time to nest and mate, on schedule with the lilacs blooming.

In the sixth quatrain, the narrator talks about how, despite all the destruction around him, the birds are just happy to have a place to nest. The birds are unconcerned with, even oblivious of, human drama. Those "versed in country things" — who understand the unsentimental course of nature — know that the birds haven't wept. However, by prefacing the phrase with "one would have to" (be versed in country things), Frost keeps his narrator from sounding like a chastising know-it-all. Frost allows for the "strong impulse (and a traditional poetic one all the way back through pastoral poetry) to believe that the birds are responsively grieving at the spectacle of human loss."
