= Choose Something Like a Star (disambiguation) =

Choose Something Like a Star may refer to:

- "Choose Something Like a Star", a poem by Robert Frost
- Choose Something Like a Star (album), 2005 album by Mormon Tabernacle Choir
- "Choose Something Like a Star" (song), 2004 song by Tim Deluxe
