= Alfred Nutt =

English publisher and folklorist (1856–1910)

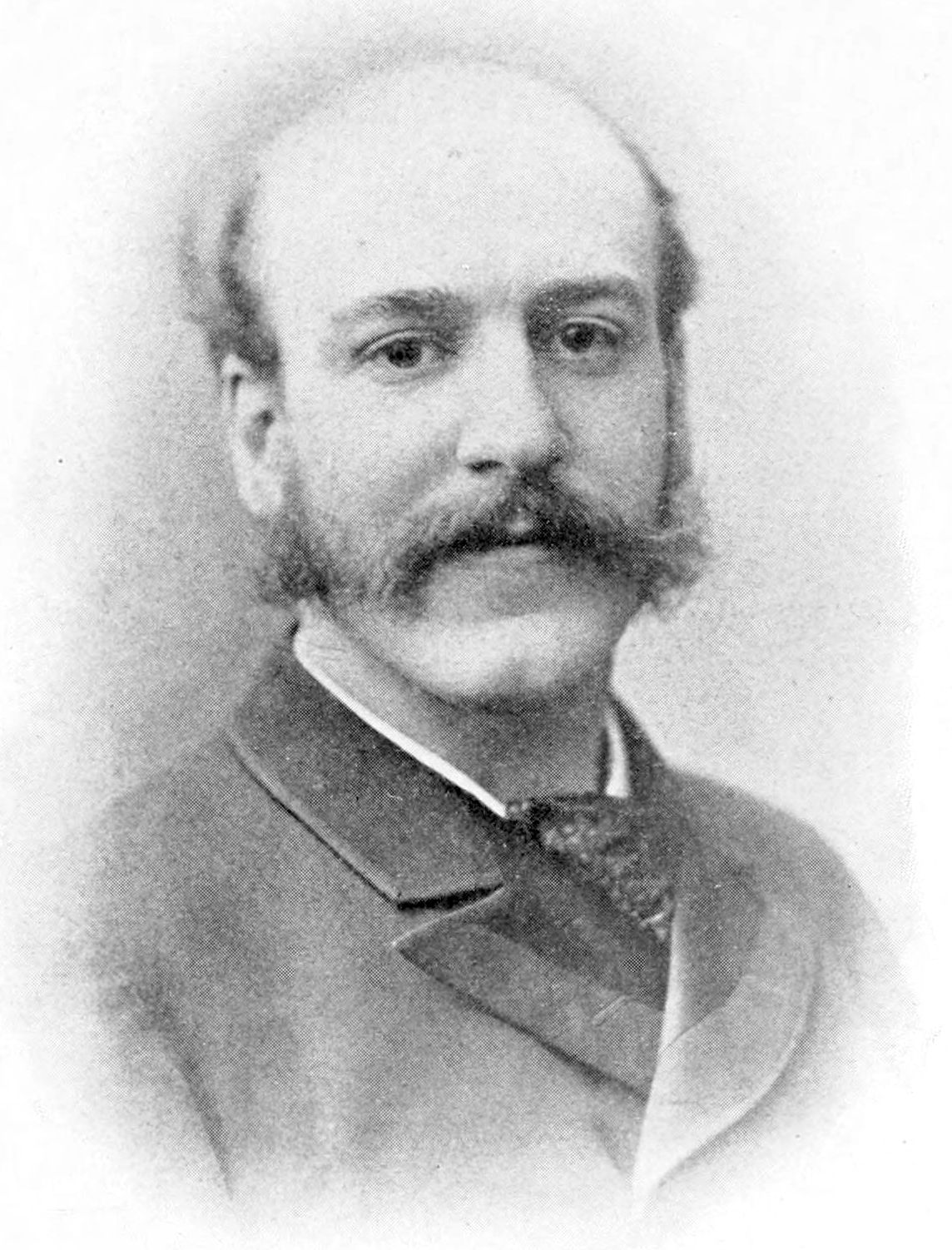
- Nutt, from an obituary
- Born: Alfred Trübner Nutt; 22 November 1856; London, England
- Died: 21 May 1910 (aged 53); Melun, France
- Occupations: Publisher; folklorist; scholar
- Spouse: Marie Louise Gelly (m. 1885)
- Children: 2
- Father: David Nutt
- Relatives: William Miller (great-grandfather)

Alfred Trübner Nutt (22 November 1856 – 21 May 1910) was an English publisher, folklorist, and scholar of Arthurian literature and Celtic studies. Born into a publishing family in London, he succeeded to his father's firm, David Nutt, in 1878. He founded The Folk-Lore Journal, served as president of The Folklore Society, and wrote on the Celtic origins of the Grail legend. He was also involved in the establishment of the Irish Texts Society. Nutt drowned in the Seine in 1910 while trying to rescue his son.

== Biography ==
=== Early life and education ===
Alfred Trübner Nutt was born in London on 22 November 1856, the eldest, and only surviving, son of bookseller and publisher David Nutt. His mother, Ellen Nutt (née Carter), was the granddaughter of another publisher, William Miller. His middle name came from his father's publishing partnership with Nicholas Trübner.

Nutt was educated at the University College School, London, and the Collège de Vitry-le-François in Vitry-le-François, France.

=== Career ===
Nutt spent three years in a business apprenticeship in Leipzig, Berlin, and Paris before taking over his late father's business in 1878. He founded The Folk-Lore Journal (later Folk-Lore) and was elected president of The Folklore Society in 1897 and 1898.

Nutt was a friend and supporter of Jessie Weston, shared her interest in the Celtic origins of the Grail legend, and published some of her books. He was associated with Whitley Stokes, Eleanor Hull and Kuno Meyer. Juliette Wood has described his work as an influence on the scholarship of Roger Sherman Loomis. Nutt was also involved in the establishment of the Irish Texts Society, and his firm produced its early publications.

His works included Studies on the Legend of the Holy Grail: With Especial Reference to the Hypothesis of Its Celtic Origin and, with Meyer, The Voyage of Bran, Son of Febal, to the Land of the Living; An Old Irish Saga. He wrote analyses of the Mabinogion and was working on an annotated edition of Matthew Arnold's Study of Celtic Literature at the time of his death.

=== Personal life and death ===
In 1885, Nutt married Marie Louise Gelly; they had two sons.

Nutt drowned in the Seine while on holiday at Melun on 21 May 1910. He had tried to rescue his disabled 17-year-old son, who had been dragged into the river when his horse bolted; his son survived. His wife succeeded him as head of the firm.

== Publications ==
- —— (1888). Studies on the Legend of the Holy Grail: With Especial Reference to the Hypothesis of Its Celtic Origin. London: David Nutt.
- ——; Hyde, Douglas (1890). Beside the Fire: A Collection of Irish Gaelic Folk Stories. London: David Nutt.
- ——; MacInnes, Duncan (1890). Folk and Hero Tales. London: David Nutt.
- ——; Meyer, Kuno (1895). The Voyage of Bran, Son of Febal, to the Land of the Living: An Old Irish Saga. London: David Nutt.
- —— (1899). Celtic and Mediæval Romance. London: David Nutt.
