= A Further Range =

Collection of poems by Robert Frost

- First edition cover
- Author: Robert Frost
- Publisher: Henry Holt & Co
- Publication date: January 1, 1936
- Awards: Pulitzer Prize for Poetry (1937)

A Further Range is a poetry collection by Robert Frost published in 1936 by Henry Holt and Company (New York) and in 1937 by Jonathan Cape (London).

== Reception ==
The political content of this volume of poetry was obvious to contemporary readers. Frost admitted that A Further Range “has got a good deal more of the times in it than anything I ever wrote before...One well known paper called me a 'counter-revolutionary' for writing it.” Frost's deep concerns about industrialization, organized labor, the New Deal and the decline of the family farm are apparent in poems such as “A Lone Striker”, “Build Soil” and “A Roadside Stand”.

The collection was awarded the Pulitzer Prize for Poetry in 1937.

== Contents ==
This volume is divided into 6 parts: 1-Taken Doubly; 2-Taken Singly; 3-Ten Mills; 4-The Outlands; 5-Build Soil; 6-Afterthought.

The dedication: "To E. F. for what it may mean to her that beyond the White Mountains were the Green; beyond both were the Rockies, the Sierras, and, in thought, the Andes and the Himalayas—range beyond range even into the realm of government and religion." "EF" is Elinor Frost, the poet's wife, to whom he dedicated every book of poetry until she died in 1938.

The poems had previously been published in The Saturday Review of Literature, The Yale Review, Poetry, Scribner’s Magazine, The Virginia Quarterly Review, The Atlantic Monthly, The American Mercury, and Books, Direction and The New Frontier.

1. "Taken Doubly"
  1. "A Lone Striker"
  2. "Two Tramps in Mud Time"
  3. "The White-Tailed Hornet
  4. "A Blue Ribbon at Amesbury"
  5. "A Drumlin Woodchuck"
  6. "The Gold Hesperidee"
  7. "In Time of Cloudburst"
  8. "A Roadside Stand"
  9. "Departmental"
  10. "The Old Barn at the Bottom of the Fogs"
  11. "On the Heart's Beginning to Cloud the Mind"
  12. "The Figure in the Doorway"
  13. "At Woodward's Gardens"
  14. "A Record Stride"
2. "Taken Singly"
  1. "Lost in Heaven"
  2. "Desert Places
  3. "Leaves Compared with Flowers"
  4. "A Leaf Treader"
  5. "On Taking from the Top to Broaden the Base"
  6. "They Were Welcome to Their Belief"
  7. "The Strong Are Saying Nothing
  8. "The Master Speed"
  9. "Moon Compasses"
  10. "Neither Out Far nor in Deep"
  11. "Voice Ways"
  12. "Design"
  13. "On a Bird Winging in its Sleep"
  14. "After-Flakes"
  15. "Clear and Colder"
  16. "Unharvested
  17. "There Are Roughly Zones"
  18. "A Trial Run"
  19. "Not Quite Social"
  20. "Provide, Provide"
3. "Ten Mills"
  1. "Precaution"
  2. "The Span of Life"
  3. "The Wrights' Biplane"
  4. "Assertive"
  5. "Evil Tendencies Cancel"
  6. "Pertinax"
  7. "Waspish"
  8. "One Guess"
  9. "The Hardship of Accounting"
  10. "Not All There
  11. "In Divés' Dive"
4. "The Outlands"
  1. "The Vindictives"
  2. "The Andes"
  3. "The Bearer of Evil Tidings"
  4. "The Himalayas"
  5. "Iris by Night
  6. "The Malverns"
5. "Build Soil"
  1. "Build Soil"
  2. "To a Thinker"
6. "Afterthought"
  1. "A Missive Missile"
