= The Demiurge's Laugh =

1913 poem by Robert Frost

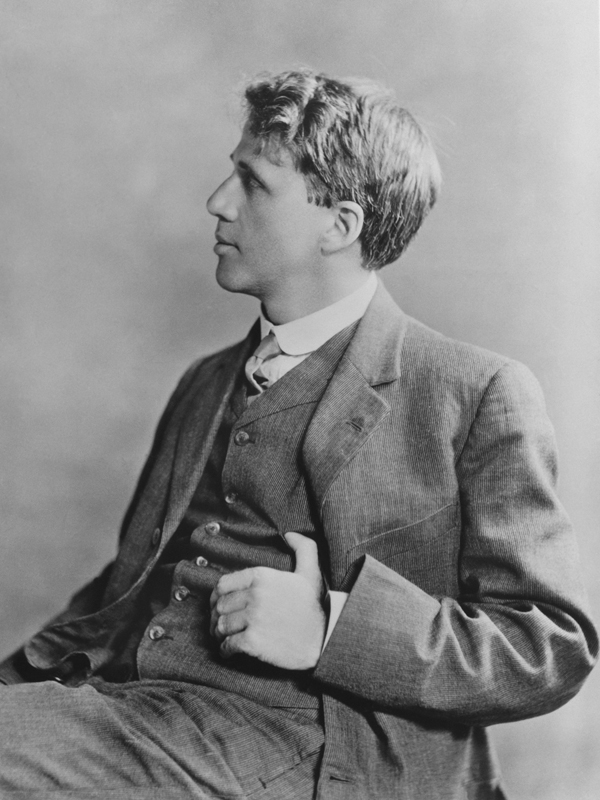
Frost in 1913

The Demiurge's Laugh is a lyric poem by American poet Robert Frost. Published in 1913 in the collection A Boy's Will, the poem tells a gothic story with supernatural themes throughout.

== Synopsis ==
It was far in the sameness of the wood;
I was running with joy on the Demon’s trail,
Though I knew what I hunted was no true god.
It was just as the light was beginning to fail
That I suddenly heard—all I needed to hear:
It has lasted me many and many a year.

The sound was behind me instead of before,
A sleepy sound, but mocking half,
As of one who utterly couldn’t care.
The Demon arose from his wallow to laugh,
Brushing the dirt from his eye as he went;
And well I knew what the Demon meant.

I shall not forget how his laugh rang out.
I felt as a fool to have been so caught,
And checked my steps to make pretence
It was something among the leaves I sought
(Though doubtful whether he stayed to see).
Thereafter I sat me against a tree.

— The Demiurge's Laugh, Robert Lee Frost

The poem follows an unnamed character whom gallivanted into the wildness while disoriented. There, he hears constant sounds until a malicious deity emerged. Demiurge, the embodiment of the devil, began profusely laughing at him. Even after the vision ended, the main character could still experience the devil's laughs ringing. Soon after, he checked his surroundings and sat down next to a tree, ending the story with him believing himself to be a fool for being caught.
