= New Hampshire (poetry collection) =

1923 poetry collection by Robert Frost

- First edition cover
- Author: Robert Frost
- Illustrator: J. J. Lankes
- Language: English
- Publisher: Henry Holt
- Publication date: October 1923
- Awards: Pulitzer Prize for Poetry (1924)
- OCLC: 510170
- Text: New Hampshire at Wikisource

New Hampshire is a 1923 poetry collection by Robert Frost, which won the 1924 Pulitzer Prize for Poetry.

The book included several of Frost's most well-known poems, including "Stopping by Woods on a Snowy Evening", "Nothing Gold Can Stay" and "Fire and Ice". Illustrations for the collection were provided by Frost's friend, woodcut artist J. J. Lankes.

== Poems ==
- "New Hampshire"
- "A Star in a Stone-Boat"
- "The Census-Taker"
- "The Star-Splitter"
- "Maple"
- "The Ax-Helve"
- "The Grindstone"
- "Paul's Wife"
- "Wild Grapes"
- "Place for a Third"
- "Two Witches"
- "An Empty Threat"
- "A Fountain, a Bottle, a Donkey's Ears, and Some Books"
- "I Will Sing You One-O"
- "Fragmentary Blue"
- "Fire and Ice"
- "In a Disused Graveyard"
- "Dust of Snow"
- "To E.T."
- "Nothing Gold Can Stay"
- "The Runaway"
- "The Aim Was Song"
- "Stopping by Woods on a Snowy Evening"
- "For Once, Then, Something"
- "Blue-Butterfly Day"
- "The Onset"
- "To Earthward"
- "Good-by and Keep Cold"
- "Two Look at Two"
- "Not to Keep"
- "A Brook in the City"
- "The Kitchen Chimney"
- "Looking for a Sunset Bird in Winter"
- "A Boundless Moment"
- "Evening in a Sugar Orchard"
- "Gathering Leaves"
- "The Valley's Singing Day"
- "Misgiving"
- "A Hillside Thaw"
- "Plowmen"
- "On a Tree Fallen Across the Road"
- "Our Singing Strength"
- "The Lockless Door"
- "The Need of Being Versed in Country Things"
