= North of Boston =

1914 collection of poems by Robert Frost

First edition published by David Nutt in London in 1914

North of Boston is a poetry collection by Robert Frost, first published in 1914 by David Nutt, in London. Most of the poems resemble short dramas or dialogues. It is also called a book of people because most of the poems deal with New England themes and Yankee farmers. Ezra Pound wrote a review of this collection in 1914. Despite it being called "North of Boston", none of the poems have that name.

== Background ==
Following its success, Henry Holt and Company republished Frost's first book in the United States, A Boy's Will, in 1915. The New York Times said in a review, "In republishing his first book after his second, Mr. Robert Frost has undertaken the difficult task of competing with himself."

== List of poems ==
- "The Pasture" (introductory poem)
- "Mending Wall"
- "The Death of the Hired Man"
- "The Mountain"
- "A Hundred Collars"
- "Home Burial"
- "The Black Cottage"
- "Blueberries"
- "A Servant to Servants"
- "After Apple-Picking"
- "The Code"
- "The Generations of Men"
- "The Housekeeper"
- "The Fear"
- "The Self-seeker"
- "The Wood-pile"
- "Good Hours"
