= After Apple-Picking =

1914 poem by Robert Frost

- by Robert Frost

Full text
- North of Boston/After Apple-picking at Wikisource

"After Apple-Picking" is a poem by American poet Robert Frost. It was published in 1914 in North of Boston, Frost's second poetry collection and placed in the centre of the volume, suggesting that it held special significance to him. Often considered Frost's best poem, After Apple Picking is 42 lines in length, does not strictly follow a particular form (instead consisting of mixed iambs), nor does it follow a standard rhyme scheme.

After Apple-Picking

My long two-pointed ladder’s sticking through a tree
Toward heaven still,
And there’s a barrel that I didn’t fill
Beside it, and there may be two or three
Apples I didn’t pick upon some bough.
But I am done with apple-picking now.
Essence of winter sleep is on the night,
The scent of apples: I am drowsing off.
I cannot rub the strangeness from my sight
I got from looking through a pane of glass
I skimmed this morning from the drinking trough
And held against the world of hoary grass.
It melted, and I let it fall and break.
But I was well
Upon my way to sleep before it fell,
And I could tell
What form my dreaming was about to take.
Magnified apples appear and disappear,
Stem end and blossom end,
And every fleck of russet showing clear.
My instep arch not only keeps the ache,
It keeps the pressure of a ladder-round.
I feel the ladder sway as the boughs bend.
And I keep hearing from the cellar bin
The rumbling sound
Of load on load of apples coming in.
For I have had too much
Of apple-picking: I am overtired
Of the great harvest I myself desired.
There were ten thousand thousand fruit to touch,
Cherish in hand, lift down, and not let fall.
For all
That struck the earth,
No matter if not bruised or spiked with stubble,
Went surely to the cider-apple heap
As of no worth.
One can see what will trouble
This sleep of mine, whatever sleep it is.
Were he not gone,
The woodchuck could say whether it’s like his
Long sleep, as I describe its coming on,
Or just some human sleep.

— Robert Frost, 1914

== Summary ==
The poem describes a pastoral scene of New England rural life in autumn. Initially, the speaker describes his abandoned equipment that is left in the orchard, after the tedious task of apple-picking. The speaker can still smell the “scent of (the) apples” (8) as he begins to approach sleep. The speaker seems to envision a distorted sense of reality, which is reflected in the blurriness of “a pane of glass” (10). The speaker then repeatedly sees apples of varying magnitudes, which “appear and disappear” (18).

The poem then offers insight into the physical exhaustion associated with apple-picking as the speaker has “had too much” (27).

One can see what will trouble

This sleep of mine, whatever sleep it is.

Were he not gone,

The woodchuck could say whether it’s like his

Long sleep, as I describe its coming on,

Or just some human sleep.

— Robert Frost, After Apple-Picking, Lines 37-42

== Versification ==
The poem's first line is in iambic hexameter, the second is in iambic dimeter. In the third line, the poem shifts to iambic pentameter. The majority of the lines continue in iambic pentameter. In lines 13-17, the meter alternates between iambic pentameter and dimeter. The remainder of the poem is composed of variations on the iambic meter, containing iambic pentameter, trimeter, dimeter, and monometer.

The rhyme scheme of the poem is inconsistent beyond the first few lines. Lines 1-4 follow an ABBA rhyme pattern, lines 5-6 follow CC, and lines 7-9 follow DED. After this, however, there is no standard pattern, with lines instead rhyming sporadically.

== Interpretation ==
Scholarly interpretation of the poem often focuses on themes of sleep, dreaming, and the sombre conclusion to the piece, in which the narrator wonders if his oncoming sleep is a normal slumber, or a "long sleep." The varying meter of the poem is thought to be indicative of the narrator's fitful state of mind as he drifts off to sleep.

The inconsistent rhyming structure contradicts Frost's typical use of rhythm. The use of the irregular rhyme scheme thus mirrors the speaker's perplexed state of mind. This disoriented rhyme scheme further induces effects of physical weariness within the reader, too. The continuous exhaustion is also suggested through using inconsistent verb tenses, from the past and present simple tense, as implied in “I am done with apple-picking now” (6) and “I am drowsing off” (8). This reinforces the blurring of the distinctive boundaries of sleep and consciousness.

The process of picking apples is symbolic through both the action itself and the apparatus used. The apple-picking ladder is a symbol, both metaphorical and real, that points to a destination beyond itself, while the act of picking apples is a metaphor for the power of labour. The power of labour is its ability to go beyond natural occurrences such as the shifting of seasons, or bodily exhaustion.

Frost highlights the idea of repetitive labour being portrayed through alliteration. By using alliteration in these lines, (30, 18, 22) Frost conveys that life, just like the labour, is repetitive in nature. Frost utilises the rhyming scheme and vowel and consonant repetition to symbolise the cyclic monotony of the work.

The speaker’s state of mind throughout the poem is that of someone who is hovering between wakefulness and sleep. The speaker states “I am drowsing off” highlighting the fact that the poem is describing the hypnagogic state of being between sleeping and waking. Future, past and present come together in the poem, and it is hard to pinpoint the exact time that Frost is referring to in lines 14 -17 . The lines seem to refer to both the memory of the morning and his current state of falling into sleep.

The poem initially lends itself to the familiar Biblical allusion of the Garden of Eden. The poem takes certain notions from the allusion, including explicit references to “apple,” (5) “heaven” (2) and “fall,” (3) which tie the poem to connotations of sin, human temptation and the Fall of Man. However, the poem explores other dilemmas that human beings experience in their daily lives. The speaker draws the reader's attention to aspects of the human condition such as working in a diligent manner, but facing self-critique. This contradiction is depicted in how the speaker does not let the multitude of apples “fall,” (3) but his sleep is still troubled, suggesting a lack of fulfilment.

On the 22nd of February in 1914, Frost wrote a letter to John Bartlett in which he developed the proposed notion of The Sound of Sense. Frost emphasised the importance of sentence sounds, suggesting that when poetry is read aloud, the sounds that are vocalised can convey additional meaning. The concept of The Sound of Sense is depicted in the alliterative /t/ sound in phrases such as “tree...two...three...” (1) where the repetition suggests that the act of apple-picking and physically handling apples requires caution and continuous effort. The contrast between the soft /s/ sounds in words such as “sleep” (7) and “scent” (8) and the harsher /k/ sounds in “looking” (10) and “break” (13) symbolises the tension between desiring rest and the overwhelming nature of tasks. This is further reinforced through Frost’s use of enjambment, which reflects the relentless and the incomplete nature of labour.
