= The Death of the Hired Man =

Poem by Robert Frost

- by Robert Frost

Full text
- North of Boston/The Death of the Hired Man at Wikisource

"The Death of the Hired Man" is a poem by Robert Frost. It narrates a conversation between a farmer (Warren) and his wife (Mary) about an old farmhand (Silas) who left in the summer, when farmhands are most needed, and has returned in winter.

The poem was published in 1914 in North of Boston, Frost's second book of poetry. Critic Harold Bloom notes that this poem was actually written in 1905 or 1906.

== Summary ==
The poem mentions two additional people: Harold Wilson, a young farmhand who also worked at this farm, and Silas' wealthy brother, who isn't named.

The conversation between Warren and Mary revolves around whether to let Silas stay. As the conversation progresses, additional facts are revealed:

- Silas is old and, thus, less fit for farm labour.
- He is not very skilled, though he works hard.
- He was receiving no wages, only shares — this was the cause of his departure.
- He is now in poor health and, it is assumed, homeless.

The dialogue occurs whilst Silas is "asleep beside the stove. / When I came up from Rowe's I found him here, / Huddled against the barn door fast asleep, / a miserable sight, and frightening, too - / You needn't smile – I didn't recognize him - / I wasn't looking for him – and he's changed. / Wait till you see." Despite his obvious poor health, Silas wants to help Warren and Mary with the next haymaking season.

Warren is displeased and wants him to leave: "But I'll not have the fellow back." Mary wishes Warren to "Be kind" and is generally warm towards Silas. Questions arise for the motivation of his homecoming – an important theme in the poem.

There is mention of Harold Wilson, a boy who helped with the haymaking "four years since" during his school days, who Silas declares must be brought back to help again with the next season. We learn that Silas and Harold did not get along: "you know how they fought / All through July under the blazing sun, / Silas up on the cart to build the load, / Harold along beside to pitch it on." It is revealed that "those days trouble Silas like a dream" and Silas's indignation at Harold's academic interests "Because he liked it—that an argument!" Upon returning however, Mary recites that Silas wants to teach Harold more about haymaking: "He thinks if he could teach him that, he'd be / Some good perhaps to someone in the world. / He hates to see a boy the fool of books."

We learn that not only did Silas leave Warren at a dire time: "Off he goes always when I need him most," but that he also has a wealthy brother who lives just "Thirteen little miles" away: "Silas has better claim on us you think / Than on his brother? Thirteen little miles / As the road winds would bring him to his door. / Silas has walked that far no doubt today. / Why doesn't he go there? His brother's rich, / A somebody – director in the bank." When Warren wonders "what's between them", Mary states: "Worthless though he is, / He won't be made ashamed to please his brother."

Mary urges Warren to see Silas. Warren returns to Mary in a short time informing her that Silas has died: "Warren returned – too soon, it seemed to her - / Slipped to her side, caught up her hand and waited. / 'Warren?' she questioned. / 'Dead' was all he answered."

== Themes ==
Several themes are touched upon by Frost in this poem including family, power, justice, mercy, age, death, friendship, redemption, guilt and belonging. A major theme in the poem is that of the 'home' or homecoming. Despite the fact that Silas' brother should seemingly be the natural home for Silas to die, he has chosen Warren and Mary's farm. Warren wrestles with the idea that "Home is the place where, when you have to go there, / They have to take you in." (This line is spoken by Mary, and received bitterly or sarcastically by Warren.) His response indicates, at least at that point in the poem, that he does not feel obliged to put a roof over Silas' head because of his leaving the farm in harvest season. Mary replies, more charitably: "I should have called it / Something you somehow haven't to deserve." Silas has evidently returned 'home' to the farm to try to reaffirm some meaning in his life before he dies by helping with the next season, and trying to redeem his relationship with Harold – neither of these pursuits are fulfilled. The poem does not blatantly imply that Warren and Mary have had children of their own. Childless marriage is a theme that Frost often addressed.

The poem shines light on Warren's progressive moral slide from resistance to acceptance of his responsibility of providing a home for Silas' death despite his wrongdoings. Should Silas be given a home that he perhaps does not deserve? Mary states that "he has come home to die: / You needn't be afraid he'll leave you this time." Continuing on her theme of Silas' worth she empathizes: "His working days are done; I'm sure of it." Perhaps an also interesting side note is Frost's choice for Mary's name and her moral values. Through the obvious moral dichotomy at the start of the poem between Warren and Mary, it can be interpreted that Mary has slowly convinced Warren to offer Silas a room at the house; obviously his offering comes too late with Silas having died, arguably alone, beside the stove.

== In other works ==
- Wheelock's Latin, p.xxv (page of 3 quotations, preceding the book's introduction) "He studied Latin like the violin, because he liked it."
