= Nothing Gold Can Stay (poem) =

Poem by Robert Frost

- by Robert Frost
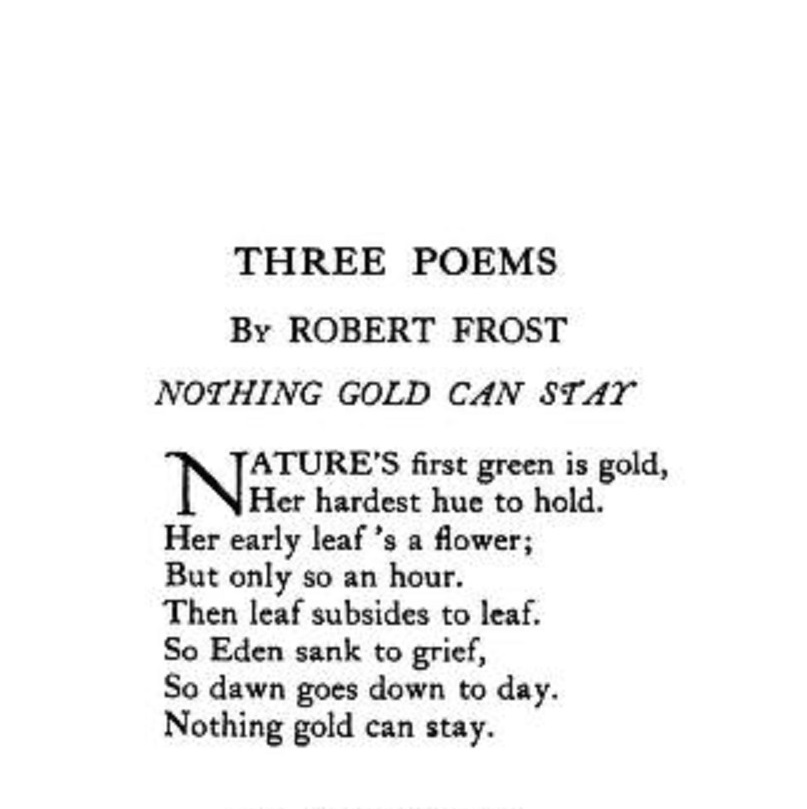
- Written: 1923
- First published in: The Yale Review
- Country: United States
- Language: English
- Subject(s): Transience, impermanence, beauty, nature, change
- Form: Lyric poem
- Meter: iambic trimeter
- Rhyme scheme: AABBCCDD
- Publication date: October 1923
- Lines: 8

Full text
- Nothing Gold Can Stay at Wikisource

Nothing Gold Can Stay

Nature's first green is gold,
Her hardest hue to hold.
Her early leaf's a flower;
But only so an hour.
Then leaf subsides to leaf.
So Eden sank to grief,
So dawn goes down to day.
Nothing gold can stay.

Reading of "Nothing Gold Can Stay"

"Nothing Gold Can Stay" is a short poem written by Robert Frost in 1923 and published in The Yale Review in October of that year. The theme mainly focuses on change, and describes nature as it changes.

It was later published in the collection New Hampshire (1923), which earned Frost the 1924 Pulitzer Prize for Poetry. The poem lapsed into public domain in 2019. New Hampshire also included Frost's poems "Fire and Ice" and "Stopping by Woods on a Snowy Evening".

== Analysis ==
The poem is written in the form of a lyric poem, with an iambic trimeter meter and AABBCCDD rhyme scheme.

== Reception ==
Alfred R. Ferguson wrote of the poem, "Perhaps no single poem more fully embodies the ambiguous balance between paradisiac good and the paradoxically more fruitful human good than 'Nothing Gold Can Stay,' a poem in which the metaphors of Eden and the Fall cohere with the idea of felix culpa."

John A. Rea wrote about the poem's "alliterative symmetry", citing as examples the second line's "hardest – hue – hold" and the seventh's "dawn – down – day"; he also points out how the "stressed vowel nuclei also contribute strongly to the structure of the poem" since the back round diphthongs bind the lines of the poem's first quatrain together while the front rising diphthongs do the same for the last four lines.

In 1984, William H. Pritchard called the poem's "perfectly limpid, toneless assertion" an example of Frost demonstrating how "his excellence extended also to the shortest of figures" and fitting Frost's "later definition of poetry as a momentary stay against confusion."

In 1993, George F. Bagby wrote the poem "projects a fairly comprehensive vision of experience" in a typical but "extraordinarily compressed" example of synecdoche that "moves from a detail of vegetable growth to the history of human failure and suffering."

== Musical adaptations ==
- "Nothing Gold Can Stay" by American composer William Thayer Ames, a choral setting of the poem.
- "Nothing Gold Can Stay" by American composer Cecil William Bentz, a choral setting of the poem in his opus, "Two Short Poems by Robert Frost."
- "Nothing Gold Can Stay" by American composer Steven Bryant, an instrumental chorale inspired by the poem.
- "Nothing Gold Can Stay" by American composer Stephen DeCesare, a chorale set to the poem's lyrics.
- "Nothing Gold" by American composer Alva Henderson, a solo for baritone accompanied by piano.
- "Nothing Gold Can Stay" by American composer Timothy P. Cooper, a choral setting of the poem.
- "Nothing Gold Can Stay" by American composer Christopher Kalstad, a choral setting of the poem
- "Nothing Gold Can Stay" by Canadian composer Kenley Kristofferson, a choral setting of the poem.
- "Nothing Gold Can Stay" by Canadian composer Nick Peros, a vocalist setting of the poem.
- "Nothing Gold Can Stay" by American composer Lelia Molthrop Sadlier, a choral setting of the poem.
- "Nothing Gold Can Stay" by American composer Rick Sowash, a choral setting of the poem.
- "Nothing Gold Can Stay" by American composer Pasquale J. Spino, a vocalist setting of the poem.
- "Nothing Gold Can Stay" by American composer Ross Thomason, a choral setting of the poem.
- "Nothing Gold Can Stay" by American composer Matthew Weisher, a choral setting of the poem.
- "Nothing Gold Can Stay" by Dutch composer Annemieke Lustenhouwer, a mixed 4-part choral setting of the poem.

== In popular culture ==
- The poem is featured in the 1967 novel The Outsiders by S. E. Hinton and the 1983 film adaptation, recited aloud by the character Ponyboy to his friend Johnny. In a subsequent scene, Johnny quotes a stanza from the poem back to Ponyboy by means of a letter read after he passes away: the phrase "Stay gold, Ponyboy. Stay gold" is commonly associated with the book. The song "Stay Gold", a song written and sang by Stevie Wonder plays over the credits of the The Outsiders film interpretation.
- Nothing Gold Can Stay is the name of the debut studio album by American pop-punk band New Found Glory, released on October 19, 1999.
- A Garfield comic strip published on October 20, 2002, featured the titular character reciting this poem, This was replaced in book collections and on-line edition. This was likely because the poem was under copyright at the time the cartoon was published (the poem lapsed into public domain in 2019).
- Two Japanese manga take their titles from the poem: "Don't Stay Gold" (a prequel to Saezuru Tori wa Habatakanai) by Yoneda Kou (drap, May 2008), and "Stay Gold" by hideyoshico (ongoing in Gateau magazine; first volume Shodensha, 2012).
- The title and part of the poem is featured in the book The Fault in Our Stars by John Green by Hazel after her boyfriend Augustus dies.
- In The Simpsons episode "Lisa's Belly," Bart says, "So dawn bros down to day. Nothing swole can stay."
- The poem is an inspiration for First Aid Kit's 2014 album, Stay Gold, and the song from the album with the same title.
- The song "Daydreamer" from Young the Giant's 2014 album "Mind over Matter" references the poem with the lyrics "When nothing in gold can stay."
- In the movie Point of No Return (1993), the tutor of Nina starts to teach her how to practice common manners by quote: ""Nature's first green is gold" means? It means that the first is best...that youth is better than old age."
- "Nothing Gold Can Stay" is the title and theme of the 10th episode of The Mentalist, Season 7.
- The song "Music to Watch Boys To" from Lana Del Rey's 2015 album Honeymoon references the poem with the lyrics "Nothing gold can stay, like love and lemonade." Del Rey again uses the lyric "Nothing gold can stay" in her song "Venice Bitch" from the 2019 album Norman Fucking Rockwell.
- "Nothing Gold Can Stay" is the poem recited by "Scottie" the English teacher and father in the NZ TV series "After the Party"
- The song "Fear" from Current Joys's 2018 album "A Different Age" references the poem with the lyrics "Starts out gold but never stays".
- The song "Nothing Gold" from After The Burial's "Embrace The Infinity" single release references the poem in the title and the lyrics.
