= David Nutt (publisher) =

London publisher

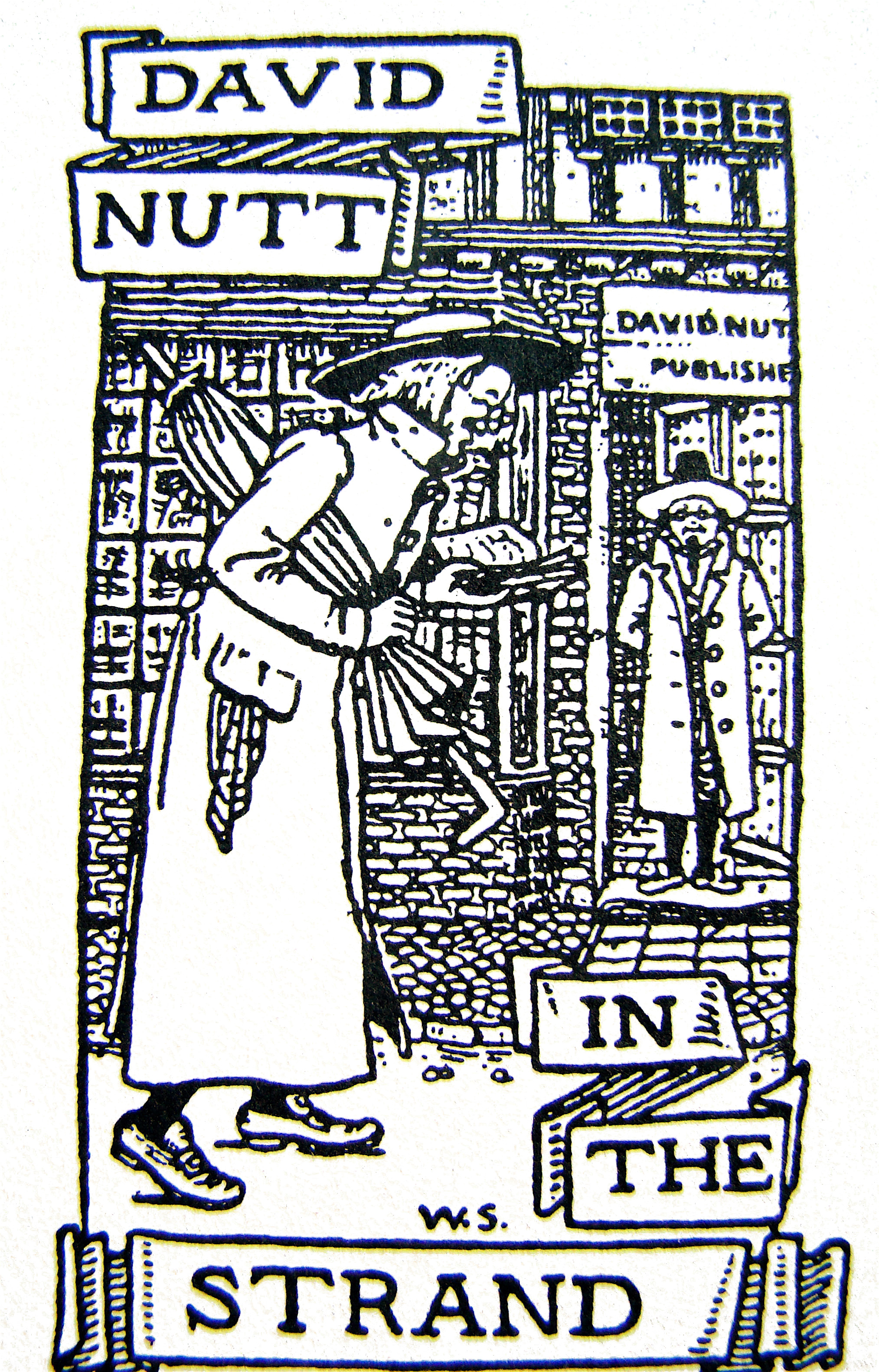
David Nutt from Children's Singing Games published in 1894

David Samuel Nutt (3 April 1810 – 28 November 1863) was an English book publisher and seller. Operating from various locations in London, Nutt specialized in the sale of imported foreign books, catering to prestigious institutions like the British Museum and private collectors. His firm ventured into publishing in the 1830s, with a focus on foreign market publications, religious and educational texts, antiquarian literature, and scholarly works. In 1851, Nutt formed a partnership with Nicholas Trübner, a German-English publisher.

Upon David Nutt's death in 1863, his son Alfred Nutt took over the firm, expanding its scope to include folklore and antiquities. Alfred significantly grew the business, publishing The Modern Language Quarterly and fostering the firm's reputation. After Alfred's sudden death in 1910, his wife Marie Louise Nutt continued the legacy, publishing renowned authors like Robert Frost. Financial challenges eventually led to the sale of the firm to Simpkin, Marshall, Hamilton Kent and Company in 1916, marking the end of the Nutt family's direct involvement in the publishing enterprise.

== Career ==
David Samuel Nutt was born in London in 1810. After attending Merchant Taylor's School, he worked for several years as a clerk with a mercantile firm in London. One of that firm's partners, Edward Moberley, encouraged Nutt to start out as a bookseller. That suggestion was supported by Adolphus Asher, a bibliographer and seller of rare books based in Berlin, who offered him a commission to represent him in London.

Nutt accepted the commission and began bookselling some time between 1829 and 1833. His first place of business was 90 Bartholomew Close, London and he would later move his premises to 58 Fleet Street, London, and then in 1848 to 270–271 Strand, London.

Nutt characterised himself variously as a "foreign and classical bookseller" and a "theological and foreign bookseller" and concentrated on the sale of imported foreign books in many of the modern and ancient European and Asian languages. Apart from books then currently in print, he also sold rare books to clients which included the libraries of the British Museum and Oxford and Cambridge universities and private collectors such as George Spencer, 2nd Earl Spencer and Thomas Grenville. In the catalogues he wrote and published to sell his books, Nutt demonstrated antiquarian and bibliographical knowledge which led to their being referenced in bibliographies written by Jacques Charles Brunet and Johann G. T. Graesse.

Nutt's firm began publishing books in the 1830s. His publishing specialities were books published for the foreign (especially German) market, as well as religious educational, antiquarian, literary and scholarly texts.

In 1851, David Nutt entered a partnership with the German-English publisher, bookseller and linguist Nicholas Trübner.

== The David Nutt firm in later years ==
Alfred Nutt was David's eldest and only surviving son. In 1878 he took over the David Nutt firm, expanded it considerably, and added books on folklore and antiquities to its list of publications. At the turn of the century The Modern Language Quarterly was also published by the firm for the Modern Language Association (Great Britain).

In 1890 the firm moved to a new address at 57-59 Long Acre, "At the Sign of the Phoenix" and in 1912 moved again, to Grape Street, New Oxford Street, London.

After Alfred's sudden death in 1910, his wife Marie Louise Nutt became the proprietor. She continued to publish new authors including the poet Robert Frost and the firm became the latter's first publisher when it published his poetry collections A Boy's Will (1913) and North of Boston (1914).

Financial difficulties forced Mrs. Nutt to sell the firm to Simpkin, Marshall, Hamilton Kent and Company in 1916.

== Personal life ==
David Nutt married Ellen Clementina Carter, the daughter of William Francis Carter, M. D and granddaughter of William Richard Beckford Miller whose publishing house was a predecessor of John Murray.

In 1864 Ellen was listed under her married name of Ella Clementina Nutt as the London representative of the German book trade.

David Nutt died at his home 28 November 1863.

== Book series ==
- The Ancient East Series
- Argyllshire Series
- Arthurian Romances Unrepresented in Malory's Morte d'Arthur
- Art Lover's Series
- Bibliothèque de Carabas
- Country Folk-lore
- Cymmrodorion Record Series
- English History by Contemporary Writers
- Grimm Library
- Method Gaspey-Otto-Sauer
- The Modern Linguist
- New York University Ottendorfer Memorial Series of Germanice Monographs
- Northern Library
- Nutt’s Conversation Dictionaries
- Nutt's Juvenile Library
- Phonetic Series
- Pilgrim Players Series
- Popular Studies in Mythology, Romance & Folklore
- Publications of the Folk-lore Society
- Scottish History from Contemporary Writers
- The Tudor Library
- The Tudor Translations
- Waifs and Strays of Celtic Tradition
- Woman Citizen's Series

== See also ==
- Elizabeth and John Nutt – Married partnership of printers
