= Fire and Ice (poem) =

1920 poem written by Robert Frost

- by Robert Frost
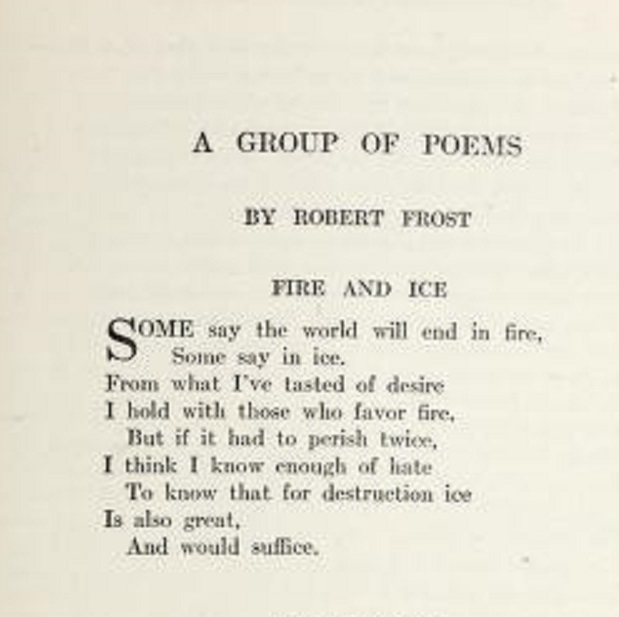
- First appearance in Harper's, December 1920.
- First published in: Harper's Magazine
- Country: United States
- Subject(s): Apocalypse, desire, hate
- Meter: iambic tetrameter and iambic dimeter
- Rhyme scheme: ABA ABC BCB
- Publication date: December 1920
- Lines: 9

Full text
- Fire and Ice at Wikisource

Fire and Ice

Some say the world will end in fire,
Some say in ice.
From what I’ve tasted of desire
I hold with those who favor fire.
But if it had to perish twice,
I think I know enough of hate
To say that for destruction ice
Is also great
And would suffice.

A reading of "Fire and Ice"

"Fire and Ice" is a short poem by Robert Frost that discusses the end of the world, likening the elemental force of fire with the emotion of desire, and ice with hate. It was first published in December 1920 in Harper's Magazine and was later published in Frost's 1923 Pulitzer Prize-winning book New Hampshire. "Fire and Ice" is one of Frost's best-known and most anthologized poems.

== Background ==
According to one of Frost's biographers, "Fire and Ice" was inspired by a passage in Canto 32 of Dante's Inferno, in which the worst offenders of hell (the traitors) are frozen in the ninth and lowest circle: "a lake so bound with ice, / It did not look like water, but like a glass...right clear / I saw, where sinners are preserved in ice."

In an anecdote he recounted in 1960 in a "Science and the Arts" presentation, the prominent astronomer Harlow Shapley claims to have inspired "Fire and Ice". Shapley describes an encounter he had with Frost a year before the poem was published in which Frost, noting that Shapley was the astronomer of his day, asked him how the world will end. Shapley responded that either the sun will explode and incinerate the Earth, or the Earth will somehow escape this fate only to end up slowly freezing in deep space. Shapley was surprised at seeing "Fire and Ice" in print a year later, and referred to it as an example of how science can influence the creation of art, or clarify its meaning.

== Analysis ==
=== Style and structure ===
The poem is written in a single nine-line stanza, which greatly narrows in the last two lines. The poem's meter is an irregular mix of iambic tetrameter and dimeter, and the rhyme scheme (which is ABA ABC BCB) suggests but departs from the rigorous pattern of Dante's terza rima.

=== Compression of Dante's Inferno ===
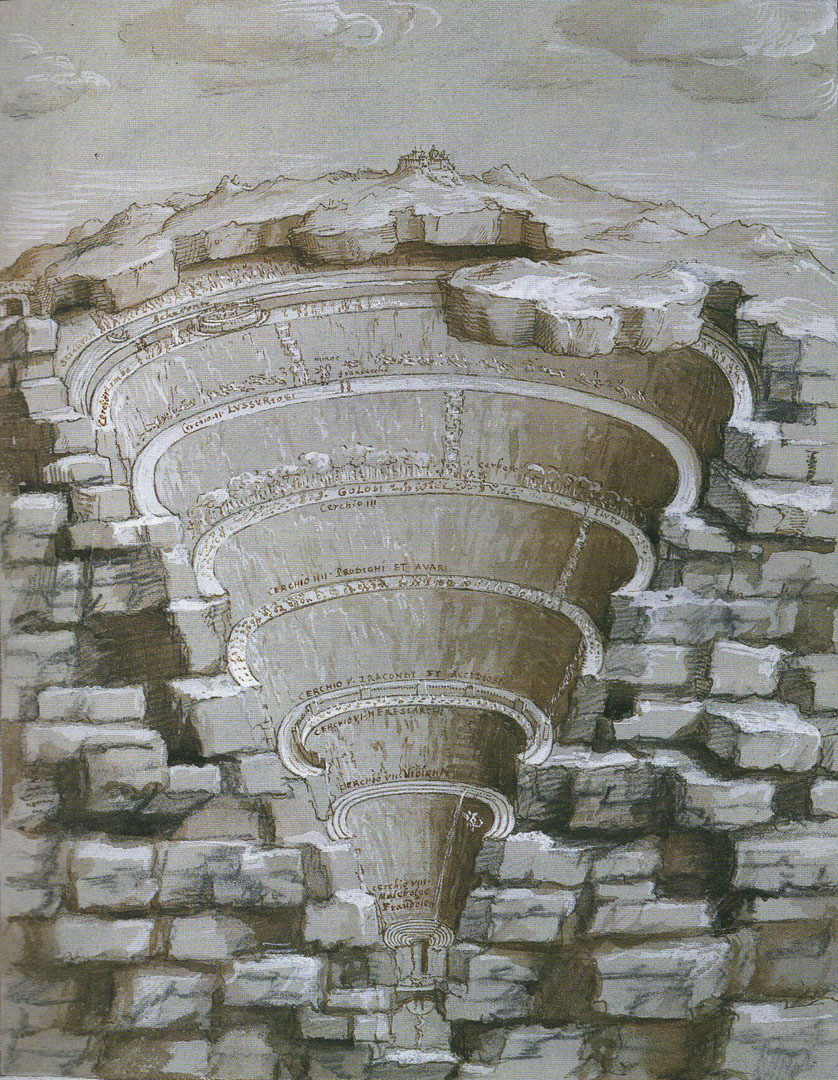
Illustration of 1587 by Stradanus of The Nine Circles of Hell from Dante's Inferno

In a 1999 article, John N. Serio claims that the poem is a compression of Dante's Inferno. He draws a parallel between the nine lines of the poem with the nine rings of Hell, and notes that, like the downward funnel of the rings of Hell, the poem narrows considerably in the last two lines. Additionally, the rhyme scheme—ABA ABC BCB—he remarks, is similar to the one Dante invented for Inferno.

Serio asserts that Frost's diction further highlights the parallels between Frost's discussion of desire and hate with Dante's outlook on sins of passion and reason with sensuous and physical verbs describing desire and loosely recalling the characters Dante met in the upper rings of Hell: "taste" (recalling the Glutton), "hold" (recalling the adulterous lovers), and "favor" (recalling the hoarders). In contrast, hate is discussed with verbs of reason and thought ("I think I know.../To say...").

== Reception ==
John N. Serio praises the poem for its compactness, arguing that "Fire and Ice" signaled for Frost "a new style, tone, manner, [and] form" and that its casual tone masks the serious question it poses to the reader.

== Musical adaptations ==
- "Fire and Ice" by the American composer Andrea Clearfield, a choral cantata using the poem's lyrics as libretto.
- "Fire and Ice" by the American composer Fred Lerdahl, a vocal arrangement of the poem.
- "Fire and Ice" by the American composer Kirke Mechem, one of the choral settings in his opus "American Trio."

== In popular culture ==
- The fantasy writer George R. R. Martin has said that the title of his A Song of Ice and Fire series, which was later adapted into the Game of Thrones television series, was partly inspired by the poem.
- The poem is the epigraph of Stephenie Meyers' book, Eclipse, of the Twilight Saga. It is also read by Kristen Stewart's character, Bella Swan, at the beginning of the film Eclipse.
- It is also an epigraph in Ghostbusters: Frozen Empire, and was referenced in various promotional materials for the film.
