= A Boy's Will =

Book by Robert Frost

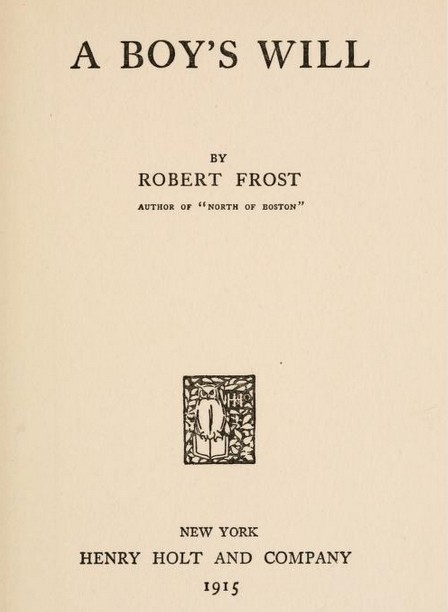
- Title page to the first American edition (Henry Holt and Company, 1915)
- Author: Robert Frost
- Language: English
- Genre: Poetry
- Publisher: David Nutt
- Publication date: 1913
- Publication place: United Kingdom
- Media type: Print
- Text: A Boy's Will at Wikisource

A Boy's Will is a poetry collection by Robert Frost, and is the poet's first commercially published book of poems. The book was first published in 1913 by David Nutt in London, with a dedication to Frost's wife, Elinor. Its first American edition came two years later, in 1915, through Henry Holt and Company.

Like much of Frost's work, the poems in A Boy's Will thematically associate with rural life, nature, philosophy, and individuality, while also alluding to earlier poets including Emily Dickinson, Thomas Hardy, William Shakespeare, and William Wordsworth. Despite the first section of poems having a theme of retreating from society, then, Frost does not retreat from his literary precursors and, instead, tries to find his place among them.

== Background ==
Frost admitted that much of the book is autobiographical. As the proof sheets were printed in January 1913, he wrote that the poems were "pretty near being the story of five years" of his life. Specifically, Frost noted that the first poem of the book, "Into My Own", expresses how he turned away from people, and "Tuft of Flowers" shows how he "came back to them." In fact, some of the poems were written as early as two decades before. Frost was apparently pleased with the book and wrote to a friend shortly after its publication, "I expect to do something to the present state of literature in America."

The title of the book comes from the repeated lines in the poem "My Lost Youth" by Henry Wadsworth Longfellow:

A boy's will is the wind's will
And the thoughts of youth are long, long thoughts.

The line is, in turn, a quote from Olaus Sirma in Lapponia (1675). Frost likely chose the title as a reflection of his own wayward early life.

== Publication history and response ==
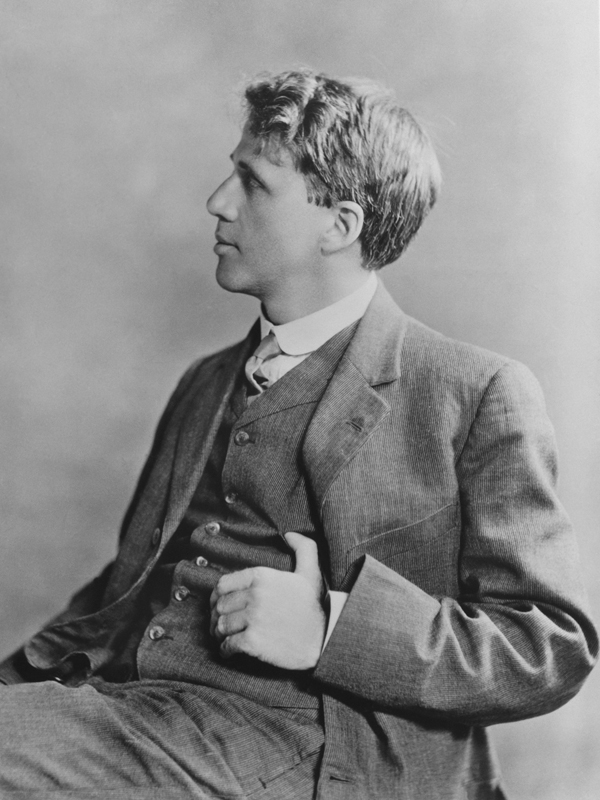
Robert Frost in 1913

Most of the poems in A Boy's Will had never been published previously. While in England, Frost determined to have them collected, and his manuscript was accepted by the first publisher he approached. The book was published by David Nutt of London in 1913, with a dedication to Frost's wife Elinor, who had assisted in choosing the poems and arranging the order for publication.

As it was being published, Frost met with fellow writer Ezra Pound, who insisted they immediately go to Nutt to see a copy of the book in print. Pound offered to write a review that day and soon introduced Frost to poet William Butler Yeats. Yeats said he considered A Boy's Will "the best poetry written in America in a long time." In his September 1913 review in the New Freeman, Pound noted: "The man has the good sense to speak naturally and to paint the thing, the thing as he sees it. And to do this is a very different matter from gunning about for the circumplectious polysyllable."

F. S. Flint was particularly pleased with the individual poems using one specific theme each, allowing "direct observation of the object and immediate correlation with the emotion—spontaneity, subtlety in the evocation of moods, humor" and praised Frost's "ear for silences." Poet Richard Aldington would similarly praise Frost's "directness of treatment" and "simplicity of speech" in North of Boston. Lascelles Abercrombie, however, warned that the simplicity of Frost's language did not imply simplicity in his poetry and in A Boy's Will, he believed "the selection and arrangement of the substance do practically everything." William Morton Payne also noted there was further complexity within the seeming simplicity of the book, writing for The Dial in 1913, "A dream world of elusive shapes and tremulous imaginings is half revealed to our vision by the subdued lyrics which Mr. Robert Frost entitles 'A Boy's Will'." The youth of the author, however, was apparent to at least one anonymous critic who wrote in a September 20, 1913, review, "We do not need to be told that the poet is a young man: the dew and the ecstasy — the audacity, too — of pristine vision are here." Overall, the book (or collection as some may call it) was widely well-received and positively reviewed.

Following the success of North of Boston in 1914, Henry Holt and Company republished A Boy's Will in 1915, becoming the first edition of the book published in the United States. The New York Times said in a review, "In republishing his first book after his second, Mr. Robert Frost has undertaken the difficult task of competing with himself."

== Contents ==
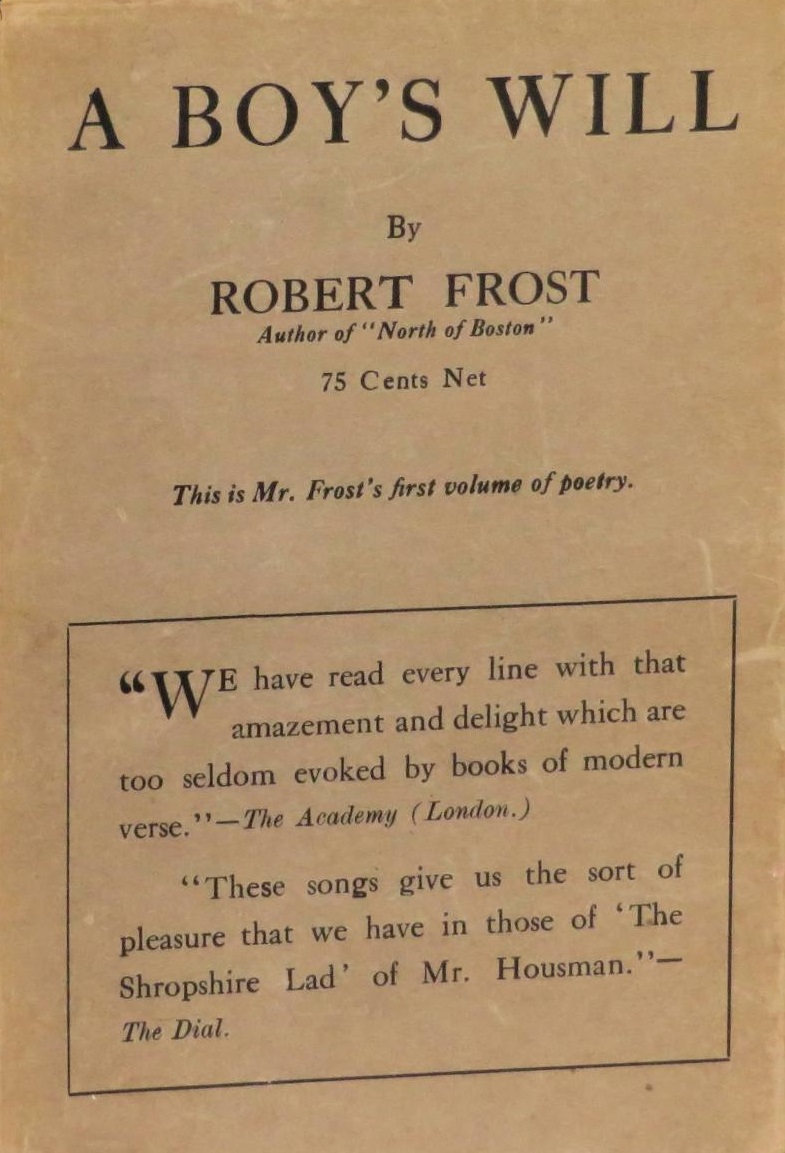
1915 first U.S. edition cover.

- Expanded Contents
- Into My Own
- Ghost House
- My November Guest
- Love and a Question
- A Late Walk
- Stars
- Storm Fear
- Wind and Window Flower
- To the Thawing Wind
- A Prayer in Spring
- Flower-gathering
- Rose Pogonias
- Asking for Roses
- Waiting Afield at Dusk
- In a Vale
- A Dream Pang
- In Neglect
- The Vantage Point
- Mowing
- Going for Water
- Revelation
- The Trial by Existence
- In Equal Sacrifice
- The Tuft of Flowers
- Spoils of the Dead
- Pan with Us
- The Demiurge's Laugh
- Now Close the Windows
- A Line-storm Song
- October
- My Butterfly
- Reluctance
