= 2008 in poetry =

Nationality words link to articles with information on the nation's poetry or literature (for instance, Irish or France).

== Events ==
- June 18 – Release in the United Kingdom of a new film, The Edge of Love, concerning Dylan Thomas' relationship with two women, starring Keira Knightley, Sienna Miller, Cillian Murphy and Matthew Rhys (as Thomas).
- September – A United Kingdom examination board, Assessment and Qualifications Alliance, asks schools to withdraw copies of its anthology which contain the poem, Education for Leisure by Carol Ann Duffy after some teachers complained about the poem's reference to knives. Other teachers oppose the move, and Duffy responds with a new poem, Mrs Schofield's GCSE.
- December 15 – The American Academy of Arts and Sciences begins awarding the May Sarton prize. Five "emerging poets" each year will receive a $2,000 honorarium and an opportunity to have their work published in the Academy's journal, Daedalus (for winners, see "Awards and honors" section, below).
- Dennis Brutus is awarded the Lifetime Honorary Award by the South African Department of Arts and Culture for his lifelong dedication to African and world poetry and literary arts. Brutus was also an activist who was imprisoned and incarcerated in the cell next to Nelson Mandela's on Robben Island from 1963 to 1965.
- Complaints about Carol Ann Duffy's poem "Education for Leisure" cause it to be withdrawn from the AQA Anthology studied in English schools.
- Dmitry Vodennikov wins a Russian poetry competition television show, "King of the Poets".
- POETomu (a play on the English word "poet" and the Russian word poetomu ("because")), a glossy magazine about poetry, is founded in Russia.

== Works published in English ==
Listed by nation where the work was first published and again by the poet's native land, if different; substantially revised works listed separately:

=== Australia ===
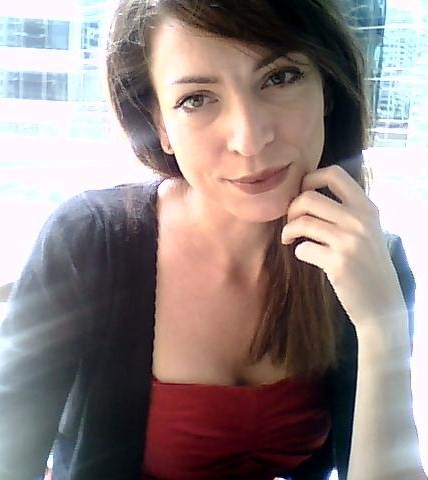
Bronwyn Lea in 2008

- Robert Adamson, The Golden Bird, winner of the C. J. Dennis Prize for Poetry in the 2009 Victorian Premier's Literary Awards, shortlisted for the 2009 Age Book of the Year Awards
- Michael Brennan, Unanimous Night
- David Brooks, The Balcony, finalist for the 2008 Kenneth Slessor Prize for Poetry; University of Queensland Press, ISBN 978-0-7022-3669-3
- Brook Emery, At a Slight Angle: and Other Poems
- Elizabeth Hodgson, Skin Painting, winner of the 2007 David Unaipon Award; University of Queensland Press, ISBN 978-0-7022-3677-8
- Sarah Holland-Batt, Aria, University of Queensland Press, winner of the Judith Wright Prize and the Anne Elder Award
- Yvette Holt, Anonymous Premonition, winner of the 2005 David Unaipon Award for an unpublished manuscript, Victorian Premier's Literary Award for Indigenous Writing (2008), and the Poets Union's Scanlon Prize for Indigenous Poetry (2008)
- Clive James, Opal Sunset: Selected Poems, 1958–2008, W.W. Norton
- Carol Jenkins, Fishing in the Devonian, Puncher & Wattmann
- John Kinsella, Divine Comedy, University of Queensland Press, ISBN 978-0-7022-3666-2
- Anthony Lawrence, Bark, University of Queensland Press, ISBN 978-0-7022-3664-8
- Bronwyn Lea, The Other Way Out, Giramondo Publishing
- David Malouf, Revolving Days, University of Queensland Press, ISBN 978-0-7022-3635-8
- Peter Rose, The Best Australian Poems 2008, including work from: Dorothy Porter, Robert Adamson, Judith Beveridge, Rosemary Dobson, Laurie Duggan, Stephen Edgar, Clive James, John Kinsella, Les Murray, Lisa Gorton, Geoffrey Lehmann, Tracy Ryan and Brenda Walker, Chris Wallace-Crabbe and Fay Zwicky; Black Inc., ISBN 978-1-86395-303-0

=== Canada ===
- Kyle Buckley, The Laundromat Essay, a long poem (Coach House Books) ISBN 978-1-55245-206-6
- Margaret Christakos, What Stirs, (Coach House Books) ISBN 978-1-55245-204-2
- Jen Currin, Hagiography (Coach House Books) ISBN 978-1-55245-197-7
- Jeramy Dodds, Crabwise to the Hounds (Coach House Books) ISBN 978-1-55245-205-9
- Gwendolyn MacEwen; Meaghan Strimas; Rosemary Sullivan; Barry Callaghan (2008). The Selected Gwendolyn MacEwen. Exile Editions, Ltd. ISBN 978-1-55096-111-9.
- Nancy Holmes, Open Wide a Wilderness: Canadian Nature Poems, Wilfrid Laurier University Press ISBN 978-1-55458-033-0
- Randall Maggs, Night Work: The Sawchuk Poems (Brick Books) ISBN 978-1-894078-62-7
- George McWhirter, The Anachronicles (Ronsdale Press) ISBN 978-1-55380-054-5
- Joe Rosenblatt & Catherine Owen, Dog; photos by Karen Moe. Toronto: Mansfield Press.
- Jordan Scott, Blert (Coach House Books) ISBN 978-1-55245-199-1
- David Silverberg, editor, Mic Check: An Anthology Of Canadian Spoken Word Poetry, Quattro Books, ISBN 978-0-9782806-5-9
- Todd Swift, Seaway: New and Selected Poems (Salmon Poetry) ISBN 978-1-903392-92-8
- R. M. Vaughan, Troubled, (Coach House Books) ISBN 978-1-55245-198-4
- Zachariah Wells, editor, Jailbreaks: 99 Canadian Sonnets, (Biblioasis) ISBN 978-1-897231-44-9

=== India, Indian poetry in English ===
- Antony Theodore, Divine Moments : Journey through the Year, ISBN 978-14-343562-3-9
- Arundhathi Subramaniam, translator, The Absent Traveller: Prākrit love poetry from the Gāthāsaptaśatī of Sātavāhana Hāla, New Delhi: Penguin India, ISBN 0-14-310080-7
- Bibhu Padhi, poet, Going to the Temple, ISBN 978-81-727340-3-9
- Eunice de Souza, editor, Both Sides of the Sky, Post-Independence Poetry in English, New Delhi: National Book Trust, ISBN 978-81-237-5331-7
- Meena Alexander, Quickly Changing River (Poetry in English), Triquarterly Books, by an Indian writing living in and published in the United States
- Jeet Thayil:
  - These Errors Are Correct, Delhi: Tranquebar Books (EastWest and Westland)
  - Editor, The Bloodaxe Book of Contemporary Indian Poets, Bloodaxe, anthology of Indian poetry in English, published in the United Kingdom
- Sujata Bhatt (2008). "Pure Lizard" (Poetry in English), Carcanet Press. Retrieved 2008-09-13.

=== Ireland ===
- Guzstáv Báger, Object Found, translated by Thomas Kabdebo; Hungarian poet published in Ireland (Salmon Press) ISBN 978-1-903392-78-2
- Ciaran Berry, The Sphere of Birds, Oldcastle: The Gallery Press, ISBN 978-1-85235-442-8
- Dermot Bolger, External Affairs, 80 pages, New Island Press, ISBN 978-1-84840-028-3
- Andrew Carpenter, editor, Thornfield: Poems by the Thornfield Poets (Salmon Press) ISBN 978-1-903392-79-9 (anthology)
- Ciarán Carson:
  - Collected Poems, Oldcastle: The Gallery Press, ISBN 978-1-85235-433-6
  - For All We Know, Oldcastle: The Gallery Press, ISBN 978-1-85235-440-4 ISBN 9781852354398
- Eileen Casey, Drinking the Colour Blue
- Gerald Dawe, Points West, Oldcastle: The Gallery Press, ISBN 978-1-85235-447-3
- Frank Golden, In Daily Accord (Salmon Press) ISBN 978-1-903392-75-1
- Maurice Harmon, The Mischievous Boy and other poems (Salmon Press) ISBN 978-1-903392-86-7
- Anne Le Marquand Hartigan, To Keep the Light Burning: Reflections in Times of Loss, poetry and prose (Salmon Poetry) ISBN 978-1-903392-96-6
- Kevin Higgins, Time Gentlemen, Please (Salmon Press) ISBN 978-1-903392-76-8
- Peter van de Kamp, In Train, Dutch native living in Ireland (Salmon Press) ISBN 978-1-903392-85-0
- Caroline Lynch, Lost in the Gaeltacht (Salmon Press) ISBN 978-1-903392-84-3
- Alan Jude Moore, Lost Republics (Salmon Poetry) ISBN 978-1-903392-93-5
- Patrick Moran, Green (Salmon Press) ISBN 978-1-903392-95-9
- Eiléan Ní Chuilleanáin: Selected Poems Gallery Press, London: Oldcastle and Faber, Irish work published in the United Kingdom
- Nuala Ní Dhomhnaill, The Fifty Minute Mermaid, translated from Irish by Paul Muldoon, Gallery Press, ISBN 1-85235-374-0
- Ulick O'Connor, The Kiss: New and Selected Poems and Translations (Salmon Press) ISBN 978-1-903392-97-3
- Lorna Shaughnessy, Torching the Brown River (Salmon Press) ISBN 978-1-903392-77-5
- Eamon Wall, A Tour of Your Country Irish native living in the United States, published in Ireland (Salmon Press) ISBN 978-1-903392-80-5

=== New Zealand ===
- Jenny Bornholdt, The Rocky Shore, winner of the Montana New Zealand Book Award for Poetry (announced September 2009)
- Kevin Ireland, How To Survive The Morning, Cape Catley Ltd, ISBN 978-1-877340-17-8
- C. K. Stead, Collected Poems 1951–2006, winner of the"reference and anthology" category of the Montana New Zealand Book Awards (announced September 2009)
- Vladimir Nabokov (posthumous), edited by Brian Boyd (New Zealand academic) and Stanislav Shvabrin, ' 'Verses and Versions: Three Centuries of Russian Poetry Selected and translated by Vladimir Nabokov' ', English translations of Russian poetry, presented next to the Russian originals, Harcourt (published in the United States)
- Sam Sampson, Everything Talks, Auckland University Press and Shearsman Books; winner of the 2009 New Zealand Society of Authors Jessie Mackay Best First Book Award for Poetry

==== Best New Zealand Poetry 2007 ====
The year's guest editor, who chose 25 poems for inclusion, was Paula Green. The list appeared at the series website in February 2008.

- Johanna Aitchison
- Angela Andrews
- Serie (Cherie) Barford
- Sarah Jane Barnett
- Jenny Bornholdt
- Alistair Te Ariki Campbell
- Janet Charman
- Geoff Cochrane
- Fiona Farrell
- Cliff Fell
- Bernadette Hall
- Anna Jackson
- Andrew Johnston
- Anne Kennedy
- Jessica Le Bas
- Dora Malech
- Alice Miller
- Emma Neale
- Vincent O’Sullivan
- Vivienne Plumb
- Richard Reeve
- Elizabeth Smither
- C. K. Stead
- Robert Sullivan
- Alison Wong

=== United Kingdom ===
- Paul Thomas Abbott, FLOOD (Clutag Press) ISBN 0-9553476-2-9
- Moniza Alvi:
  - Europa, shortlisted for the T. S. Eliot Prize; Bloodaxe Books
  - Split World: Poems 1990–2005, Bloodaxe Books
- Annemarie Austin, Very: New and Selected Poems, Bloodaxe Books, Bloodaxe Books
- Mourid Barghouti, Midnight and Other Poems, translated by Radwa Ashour, Palestinian poet published in the United Kingdom (Arc Publications), ISBN 978-1-906570-08-8
- Paul Batchelor, The Sinking Road
- Marck L. Beggs, Catastrophic Chords (Salmon Poetry) ISBN 978-1-903392-89-8
- Robyn Bolam, New Wings
- Zoë Brigley, The Secret
- Constantine Cavafy, The Selected Poems of Cavafy, translated from the original Greek by Avi Sharon, Penguin Classic, ISBN 978-0-14-118561-3
- Felix Dennis, Homeless in my Heart, Ebury Press (Random House), ISBN 0-09-192800-1
- Menna Elfyn, Perfect Blemish, translated by Elin Ap Hywel from the original Welsh; Bloodaxe Books
- Janet Frame, Storms Will Tell: Selected Poems, Bloodaxe Books; posthumously published
- Anne Gorrick, Kyotologic, Shearsman Books, ISBN 978-1-84861-004-0 (American, published in the United Kingdom)
- Chris Greenhalgh, The Invention of Zero, Bloodaxe Books
- Jane Griffiths, Another Country: New and Selected Poems, Bloodaxe Books
- Liam Guilar, Lady Godiva and Me (Nine Arches Press) ISBN 978-0-9560559-1-0
- Jen Hadfield, Nigh-no-place, Bloodaxe Books
- David Harsent, Selected Poems 1969–2005, ISBN 978-0-571-23401-1
- Selima Hill:
  - Gloria: Selected Poems, Bloodaxe Books
  - The Hat, Bloodaxe Books
- Mick Imlah, The Lost Leader, Faber and Faber, ISBN 978-0-571-24307-5
- Clive James, Angels Over Elsinore: Collected Verse 2003–2008 (Picador)
- Esther Jansma, What It Is, edited and translated by Francis R. Jones from the original Dutch, Bloodaxe Books
- Daniel Kane, Ostentation of Peacocks, (Egg Box Publishing) ISBN 978-0-9543920-9-3
- Jackie Kay:
  - Darling: New and Selected Poems, Bloodaxe Books
  - The Lamplighter, Bloodaxe Books
- Agnes Lehoczky, Budapest to Babel, (Egg Box Publishing) ISBN 978-0-9543920-6-2
- Ira Lightman, Duetcetera (Shearsman Books) ISBN 978-1-84861-011-8
- Jack Mapanje, Beasts of Nalunga, Bloodaxe Books
- Robert Minhinnick, King Driftwood, Carcanet ISBN 978-1-85754-965-2 Welsh poet, writing in English
- Kenji Miyazawa, Strong in the Rain: Selected Poems, translated from the original Japanese by Roger Pulvers, Bloodaxe Books
- Eiléan Ní Chuilleanáin: Selected Poems Gallery Press, London: Oldcastle and Faber, Irish work published in the United Kingdom
- Stephanie Norgate, Hidden River, Bloodaxe Books
- Naomi Shihab Nye, Tender Spot: Selected Poems, Bloodaxe Books
- Sean O'Brien, Andrew Marvell: poems selected by Sean O'Brien (Poet to Poet series, Faber and Faber)
- Julie O'Callaghan, Tell Me This Is Normal: New & Selected Poems, Bloodaxe Books
- Pamela Robertson-Pearse, editor, In Person: 30 Poets, including two DVDs, ISBN 1-85224-800-9, Bloodaxe Books
- Anne Rouse, The Upshot: New and Selected Poems, Bloodaxe Books
- John Sears, Reading George Szirtes, Bloodaxe Books
- Yi Sha, Starve the Poets!, edited and translated from the original Chinese by Simon Patton and Tao Naikan, Bloodaxe Books
- Elena Shvarts, Birdsong on the Seabed, edited and translated from the original Russian by Sasha Dugdale, Bloodaxe Books
- Pauline Stainer, Crossing the Snowline, Bloodaxe Books
- George Szirtes, New and Collected Poems, Bloodaxe Books
- Edward Thomas, The Annotated Collected Poems, Bloodaxe Books
- Ruth Thompson, The Flaggy Shore, (bluechrome Publishing) ISBN 978-1-906061-59-3 Northern Irish poet published in United Kingdom
- Tomas Venclova, The Junction, translated from the original Lithuanian by Ellen Hinsey, Bloodaxe Books
- Rab Wilson, Life Sentence: More Poems Chiefly in the Scots Dialect (Luath Press Ltd) ISBN 978-1-906307-89-9

==== Anthologies in the United Kingdom ====
- Lesley Duncan, editor, 100 Favourite Poems of the Day (Luath Press Ltd) ISBN 978-1-906307-08-0
- Mark Richardson, editor, The Big Green Poetry Machine Poems from Scotland (Young Writers) ISBN 978-1-84431-787-5
- Jeet Thayil, editor, The Bloodaxe Book of Contemporary Indian Poets, Bloodaxe Books ISBN 978-1-85224-801-7
- Forward Book of Poetry 2009 (published October 2008), Faber and Faber, ISBN 978-0-571-24396-9

==== Criticism, biography and scholarship in the United Kingdom ====
- Bloodaxe Poetry Lectures: a series of talks by poets at the University of Newcastle upon Tyne about the craft and practice of poetry, published by Bloodaxe Books:
  - Maura Dooley, editor, Life Under Water
  - Jane Hirshfield, Hiddenness, Uncertainty, Surprise
  - Jo Shapcott, The Transformers: Newcastle
- Josephine Nock-Hee Park, Apparitions of Asia: Modernist Form and Asian American Poetics, Oxford University Press, scholarship
- James Persoon and Robert R. Watson, editors, The Facts on File Companion to British Poetry, 1900 to the Present ISBN 978-0-8160-6406-9
- Shira Wolosky, The Art of Poetry: How to Read a Poem, Oxford University Press, scholarship

=== United States ===
- Meena Alexander, Quickly Changing River, Triquarterly Books, by an Indian writing living in and published in the United States
- Rae Armantrout:Versed (Wesleyan, 2008)
- Mary Jo Bang, Elegy, Graywolf Press
- Ed Barrett, Bosston, Boston: Pressed Wafer, ISBN 978-0-9785156-4-5
- Frank Bidart, Watching the Spring Festival (Macmillan/Farrar, Straus and Giroux), ISBN 978-0-374-28603-3
- Charles Bukowski, The People Look Like Flowers At Last: New Poems, purportedly the "fifth and final" posthumous collection
- William Corbett, Opening Day (Hanging Loose Press, 2008)
- Robert Creeley, Selected Poems, 1945–2005, edited by Benjamin Friedlander, University of California Press
- Mark Doty:
  - Theories and Apparitions, London: Jonathan Cape
  - Fire to Fire: New and Selected Poems, New York, HarperCollins
- Elvis Dino Esquivel, Sólo lloré en otoño (Spanish), Solar Empire Publishing, ISBN 978-0-615-59438-5
- Reginald Gibbons, Creatures of a Day, Louisiana State University Press, ISBN 0-8071-3318-3
- Anne Gorrick, Kyotologic, Shearsman Books, ISBN 978-1-84861-004-0 (American, published in the United Kingdom)
- Jorie Graham, Sea Change Ecco/HarperCollins
- Geoffrey Hill, A Treatise of Civil Power, Yale University Press, ISBN 978-0-300-13149-9
- John Hollander, A Draft of Light, Knopf (in May), his 19th book of poems
- Richard Howard, Without Saying (Turtle Point Press) ISBN 978-1-933527-14-7
- Kimberly Johnson, "A Metaphorical God" (Persea Books) ISBN 978-0-89255-342-6
- Devin Johnston, Sources, (Turtle Point Press)
- George Johnston, The Essential George Johnston, selected by Robyn Sarah, The Porcupine's Quill, ISBN 978-0-88984-299-1
- August Kleinzahler, ' 'Sleeping It Off in Rapid City' ', Farrar, Straus and Giroux
- Ted Kooser, Valentines, University of Nebraska Press
- David Lehman, editor, The Best American Erotic Poems: From 1800 to the Present (anthology), Scribner
- Sarah Lindsay, Twigs and Knucklebones, Copper Canyon Press
- Magus Magnus, Verb Sap, Narrow House ISBN 978-0-9793901-1-1
- Jackson Mac Low, Thing of Beauty: New and Selected Works (edited by Anne Tardos), (University of California Press)
- James Merrill, Selected Poems, edited by J. D. McClatchy and Stephen Yenser (Alfred A. Knopf)
- W. S. Merwin, The Shadow of Sirius; Port Townsend, Washington: Copper Canyon Press; awarded the Pulitzer Prize for Poetry in 2009
- Rusty Morrison, true keeps calm biding its story, Small Press Distribution, ISBN 978-0-916272-98-2.
- George Oppen, Selected Prose, Daybooks, and Papers (edited by Stephen Cope), (University of California Press) (publication was 2007, but not available until 2008)
- Peter Oresick, Warhol-o-rama, Carnegie Mellon University Press
- Danielle Pafunda, ' 'My Zorba' ', Bloof Books
- Grace Paley, Fidelity (Farrar, Straus & Giroux), posthumous
- Kenneth Patchen, The Walking-Away World, New Directions, ISBN 978-0-8112-1757-6 (posthumous)
- Alan Michael Parker, Elephants & Butterflies, BOA Editions, ISBN 978-1-934414-05-7
- Jacqueline Risset, Sleep's Powers, translated from French by Jennifer Moxley, Ugly Duckling Presse ISBN 978-1-933254-42-5
- Aram Saroyan, Complete Minimal Poems, Ugly Duckling Presse ISBN 978-1-933254-25-8
- Leslie Scalapino, It's go in horizontal: Selected Poems, 1974–2006, (University of California Press)
- Susan M. Schultz, Dementia Blog, (Singing Horse Press)
- Ron Silliman, The Alphabet, University of Alabama Press, ISBN 978-0-8173-5493-0
- Patricia Smith, Blood Dazzler
- Jack Spicer, my vocabulary did this to me: The Collected Poetry of Jack Spicer, edited by Peter Gizzi and Kevin Killian, Wesleyan University Press, ISBN 978-0-8195-6887-8 (posthumous)
- Gertrude Stein, Tender Buttons, introduction by Steve McCaffery, BookThug, Toronto
- Richard Tayson, The World Underneath (Kent State University Press, ISBN 978-0-87338-948-8)
- David Wagoner, A Map of the Night (University of Illinois Press, ISBN 978-0-252-07567-4)
- Francis X. Walker, When Winter Come: The Ascension of York, University of Kentucky Press
- John Witte, Second Nature, University of Washington Press, ISBN 978-0-295-98859-7
- Mark Yakich, The Importance of Peeling Potatoes in Ukraine, Penguin

==== Anthologies in the United States ====
- Tina Chang and Nathalie Handal, editors, Language for a New Century: Contemporary Poetry from the Middle East, Asia, and Beyond, W. W. Norton & Company, ISBN 978-0-393-33238-4
- Vladimir Nabokov (posthumous), edited by Brian Boyd and Stanislav Shvabrin, Verses and Versions: Three Centuries of Russian Poetry Selected and translated by Vladimir Nabokov, English translations of Russian poetry, presented next to the Russian originals, Harcourt
- Nguyen Do and Paul Hoover, editors, Black Dog, Black Night, anthology of contemporary Vietnamese poetry from 21 poets, many of whom had never previously been translated into English; Milkweed ISBN 978-1-57131-430-7
- Leslie Pockell and Celia Johnson, editors, 100 Poems to Lift Your Spirits, Grand Central Publishing, ISBN 978-0-446-17795-5
- Reginald Shepherd, editor, Lyric Postmodernisms: An Anthology of Contemporary Poetries, Counterpath Press, ISBN 978-1-933996-06-6
- Jason Shinder, John Lithgow, Billy Collins, editors, The Poem I Turn To: Actors and Directors Present Poetry That Inspires Them, ISBN 978-1-4022-0502-6
- Mark Strand and Jeb Livingood, editors, Best New Poets 2008, including work by Zach Savich, Heidi Poon, and Malachi Black
- Carolyne Wright, editor and translator, Majestic Nights: Love Poems of Bengali Women, Buffalo, New York: White Pine Press, ISBN 978-1-893996-93-9

==== Criticism, scholarship and biography in the United States ====
- Michael Almereyda, editor, Night Wraps the Sky: Writings by and about Mayakovsky (Macmillan/Farrar, Straus, and Giroux), ISBN 978-0-374-28135-9
- Robert Frost, The Collected Prose of Robert Frost, edited by Mark Richardson; Frost was reluctant to publish his collected prose and even said he lost his notes to the Charles Eliot Norton Lectures he delivered at Harvard in 1936 (Harvard University Press)
- Donald Hall, Unpacking the Boxes: A Memoir of a Life in Poetry, Houghton Mifflin
- Michael Heller, Speaking the Estranged: Essays on the Work of George Oppen, Cambridge UK: Salt Publishing
- Michael Palmer, Active Boundaries: Selected Essays and Talks, New Directions (New York, NY), 2008. ISBN 0-8112-1754-X
- Reginald Shepherd, Orpheus in the Bronx: Essays on Identity, Politics, and the Freedom of Poetry, University of Michigan Press
- Jan Ziolkowski and Bridget K. Balint, editors, A Garland of Satire, Wisdom, and History: Latin Verse from Twelfth-Century France (Carmina Houghtoniensia), Harvard University Press, ISBN 0-9765472-7-9 ISBN 9780976547273

==== Poets in The Best American Poetry 2008 ====
These poets appeared in The Best American Poetry 2008, with David Lehman, general editor, and Charles Wright, guest editor (who selected the poetry) (Scribner ISBN 0-7432-9973-6):

- Tom Andrews
- Ralph Angel
- Rae Armantrout
- John Ashbery
- Joshua Beckman
- Marvin Bell
- Charles Bernstein
- Ciaran Berry
- Frank Bidart
- Robert Bly
- John Casteen
- Laura Cronk
- Kate Daniels
- Lydia Davis
- Erica Dawson
- Cornelius Eady
- Moira Egan
- Peter Everwine
- Carolyn Forche
- Chris Forhan
- John Gallaher
- James Galvin
- Louise Gluck
- Robert Hass
- Bob Hicok
- Brenda Hillman
- Tony Hoagland
- Garrett Hongo
- Richard Howard
- Mark Jarman
- George Kalamars
- Mary Karr
- Maxine Kumin
- Adrie Kusserow
- Alex Lemon
- Philip Levine
- J.D. McClatchy
- Davis McCombs
- W. S. Merwin
- Susan Mitchell
- Paul Muldoon
- D. Nurkse
- Debra Nystrom
- Meghan O'Rourke
- Ron Padgett
- Michael Palmer
- D. A. Powell
- Alberto Rios
- Tim Ross
- John Rybicki
- Ira Sadoff
- Sherod Santos
- Frederick Seidel
- Charles Simic
- R. T. Smith
- Patti Smith
- Dave Snyder
- Lisa Ross Sparr
- David St. John
- Kathryn Starbuck
- Alan Sullivan
- Chad Sweeney
- Mary Szybist
- James Tate
- Natasha Trethewey
- Lee Upton
- Dara Wier
- C. K. Williams
- Franz Wright
- Lynn Xu
- C. Dale Young
- David Young
- Dean Young
- Kevin Young

== Works published in other languages ==
=== French language ===
==== France ====
- Stéphane Bataillon, Sylvestre Clancier and Bruno Doucey, editors, Poésies de langue française: 144 poètes d'aujourd'hui autour du monde ("Poems in the French Language: 144 Contemporary Poets from Around the World"), Éditions Seghurs, ISBN 978-2-232-12305-4, anthology
- Yves Bonnefoy, La Longue Chaîne de l'Ancre ("The Anchor's Long Chain"), publisher: Mercure de France
- Hélène Dorion, Le Hublot des heures, Paris, Éditions de La Différence; Canadian poet published in France
- Haïjin, translated from her Japanese edition, Du rouge aux lèvres ("Red lips"), publisher: La Table Ronde, short poems to be read aloud in a single breath
- Philippe Jaccottet, Ce peu de bruits ("This Little Noise"), publisher: Gallimard
- Vénus Khoury-Ghata, Les Obscurcis, publisher: Mercure de France
- Abdellatif Laabi, Tribulations d'un rêveur attitré, coll. La Clepsydre, La Différence, Paris, Moroccan author writing French and published in France
- Jacques Prévert (illustrated with photography by Izis Bidermanas), Grand bal du printemps, publisher: Le Cherche midi
- Jean Max Tixier, Le grenier à sel, publisher: Encres vives
- Jean-Vincent Verdonnet, Mots en maraude, illustrated by Marie-Claude Enevoldsen-Bussat, Publisher: Voix d'Encre

==== Canadian poetry in French ====
- Roger Des Roches, Dixhuitjuilletdeuxmillequatre, winner of the Prix Chasse-Spleen
- Hélène Dorion, Le Hublot des heures, Paris, Éditions de La Différence; Canadian poet published in France

=== Germany ===
- Christoph Buchwald, series editor, and Ulf Stolterfoht, guest editor, Jahrbuch der Lyrik 2008 ("Yearbook of Poetry 2008"), Frankfurt: Fischer (S.), 215 pages, ISBN 978-3-10-009654-8, anthology
- Christoph Janacs:
  - die Ungewissheit der Barke/la barca sin certidumbre ("The Uncertainty of the Boat"), publisher: Arovell
  - Nachtwache ("Nightwatch"), Edition Thanhäuser, 37 poems; St. Georgs Presse
- Bjoern Kuligk and Jan Wagner, editors, Lyrik von Jetzt 2 ("Poetry of Now 2"), publisher: Berlin Verlag, featuring poetry by 50 authors born after 1969 (a follow-up volume to Lyrik von Jetzt, published in 2003
- Steffen Popp, Kolonie zur Sonne: Gedichte ("Colony to the Sun: Poems"), Kookbooks, 59 pages, ISBN 978-3-937445-35-9
- Sabine Scho:
  - Album: Gedichte ("Album: Poems"), Kookbooks, 62 pages, ISBN 978-3-937445-29-8
  - Farben ("Colors"), Kookbooks, 78 pages, ISBN 978-3-937445-34-2

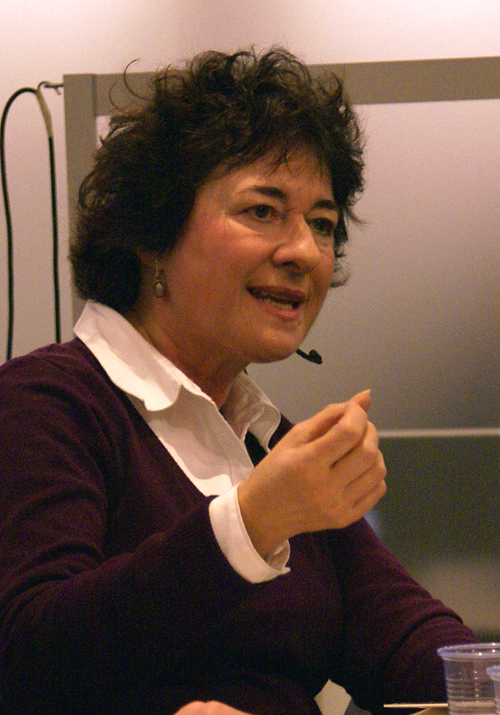
Danish poet Pia Tafdrup

=== Greece ===
- Michael Longley, Το χταπόδι του Ομήρου ("The Octopus of Homer"), translated from the original English of the Irish author by Harris Vlavianos, Athens: Patakis
- Katerina Iliopoulou, Asylum, Melani editions
- George Koropoulis (Γιώργος Κοροπούλης), Αντιύλη ("Antimatter'"), Athens: Upsilon
- Dionysis Kapsalis (Διονύσης Καψάλης), Όλα τα δειλινά του κόσμου ("All the Sunsets in the World"), Athens: Agra
- Stamatis Polenakis, Notre Dames, publisher: Odos Panos Editions

=== India ===
Listed in alphabetical order by first name:

- Bharat Majhi, Highware Kuhudi, Bhubaneswar: Pakshighara Prakasani; Oriya
- Jiban Narah, Momaideur Phulani, Guwahati, Assam: Banalata; Assamese-language
- K. Siva Reddy, Posaganivannee, Hyderabad: Jhari Poetry Circle, Telugu-language
- P. P. Ramachandran, Kalamkaari, Kottayam: DC Books; Malayalam
- Raghavan Atholi, Chavumazhakal, Kottayam: DC Books; Malayalam
- Rituraj, Chuni Huin Kavitayen, Hindi-language
- Sitanshu Yashaschandra, Vakhar, Mumbai and Ahmedabad: R R Sheth & Co.; Gujarati
- Teji Grover, Maitri, Bikaner: Surya Prakashan Mandir, Hindi-language

=== Iran ===
- Sarvenaz Heraner, Sarrizha-yi sukut (“Overflowing of Silence”)
- Mohammad Reza Shafi'i Kadkani, editor, Gozideh-ye Ghazaliyat-e Shams extensive, annotated selections from Divan-e Shams-e Tabrizi ("The Collected Poems of Shams of Tabriz")by Rumi; Persian, published in Iran
- Ru'ya Muqaddas, Ru'yaha-yi 'ashiqanah: 'ashiqanahha-yi Ru'ya ("Loverly Reveries: Love Songs of Ru'ya")

=== Poland ===
- Kazimierz Brakoniecki, Glosolalie
- Ryszard Kapuściński, Wiersze zebrane, posthumously published
- Ludwik Jerzy Kern, Litery cztery. Wiersze prawie wszystkie
- Krzysztof Koehler, Porwanie Europy ("Kidnapping Europe")
- Tadeusz Różewicz, Kup kota w worku, Wrocław: Biuro Literackie
- Eugeniusz Tkaczyszyn-Dycki, Piosenka o zależnościach i uzależnieniach, winner of both the Gdynia Literary Prize, for poetry and the Nike Award for literature in 2009

=== Russia ===
- Yelena Fanailova, Baltisky dnevnik ("Baltic Diary")
- Yelena Shvarts, Collected Works, Volumes 3 and 4
- Books of poetry were published by Mikhail Aizenberg, Vasily Borodin, Natalya Gorbanevskaya, Alla Gorbunova, Vadim Mesyats, Andrey Rodionov and Aleksey Tsvetkov

=== Other languages ===
- Herberto Helder, A faca não corta o fogo: súmula e inédita; Portugal
- Jang Jin-sung, I Am Selling My Daughter for 100 Won (내 딸을 백원에 팝니다), Korea
- Tarawa Machi, Japanese tanka poet, translated into French by Yves-Marie Allioux, Salad Anniversary ("L'Anniversaire de la Salade"), Éditions Philippe Picquier
- Pia Tafdrup, Boomerang, Copenhagen: Gyldendal Publishers, Denmark
- Rahman Henry, Gottrobhumikaheen, Bhasachitra, Dhaka, Bangladesh. Bangladesh; Shrestha Kabita, NODEE publishing and Media House, Dhaka, Bangladesh
- Ghassan Zaqtan, Like a Straw Bird it Follows Me, Palestinian (Arabic)

== Awards and honors ==
=== International ===
- Golden Wreath of Poetry: Fatos Arapi (Albania)
- Beca Internacional Antonio Machado de creación poética: Subhro Bandopadhyay (India)

=== Australia awards and honors ===
- C. J. Dennis Prize for Poetry: Robert Adamson, The Golden Bird (Black Inc); finalists: Carol Jenkins – Fishing in the Devonian (Puncher and Wattman); Bronwyn Lea, The Other Way Out (Giramondo Publishing)
- Kenneth Slessor Prize for Poetry
- Arts Queensland Judith Wright Calanthe Award
- Arts ACT Judith Wright Prize
- Fellowship of Australian Writers Anne Elder Award

=== Canada awards and honors ===
- Lampman-Scott Award: Shane Rhodes, The Bindery
- Gerald Lampert Award: Alex Boyd, Making Bones Walk
- Governor General's Awards:
  - English language: Jacob Scheier, More to Keep Us Warm
  - French language: Michel Pleau, La Lanteur du monde
- Griffin Poetry Prize: Canadian: Robin Blaser, The Holy Forest: Collected Poems
- Griffin Poetry Prize: International, in the English Language: John Ashbery, Notes from the Air: Selected Later Poems (HarperCollins Publishers/Ecco)
  - Others on the shortlist: David Harsent, Selected Poems 1969–2005 (Faber); Elaine Equi, Ripple Effect: New and Selected Poems (Coffee House Press); Clayton Eshleman, translating from the Spanish by César Vallejo, The Complete Poetry: A Bilingual Edition (University of California Press)
- Pat Lowther Award: Anne Simpson, Quick
- Prix Alain-Grandbois: Nathalie Stephens, ...s'arrête? Je
- Dorothy Livesay Poetry Prize: Rita Wong, Forage
- Prix Émile-Nelligan: Catherine Lalonde, Corps étranger

=== India awards and honors ===
- Sahitya Akademi Award : Jayant Parmer for Pencil Aur Doosri Nazmein (Urdu)
- Jnanpith Award : Akhlaq Mohammed Khan (Shahryar)

=== New Zealand awards and honors ===
- Prime Minister's Awards for Literary Achievement:
- Montana New Zealand Book Awards (poetry categories):

Poetry - Janet Charman, Cold Snack. Auckland University Press
Jessie Mackay Best First Book of Poetry - Jessica Le Bas, Incognito. Auckland University Press

=== United Kingdom awards and honors ===
- Cholmondeley Award: John Burnside, David Harsent, John Greening and Sarah Maguire
- Costa Award (formerly "Whitbread Awards") for poetry: Jean Sprackland, Tilt (Cape)
  - Shortlist (announced in November 2007): Ian Duhig, The Speed of Dark, John Fuller, The Space of Joy, Daljit Nagra, Look We Have Coming to Dover!
- English Association's Fellows' Poetry Prizes: Tony Flynn (first prize), Kim Rooney (second prize) and Peter Cash and Simon Jackson (joint third prize)
- Eric Gregory Award (for a collection of poems by a poet under the age of 30): Emily Berry, Rhiannon Hooson, James Midgley, Adam O'Riordan and Heather Phillipson
- Forward Poetry Prize:
  - Best Collection:
    - Shortlist: Sujata Bhatt, Pure Lizard (Carcanet); Jane Griffiths, Another Country (Bloodaxe); Jen Hadfield, Nigh-No-Place (Bloodaxe); Mick Imlah, The Lost Leader (Faber), Jamie McKendrick, Crocodiles & Obelisks (Faber); and Catherine Smith, Lip (Smith/Doorstop)
  - Best First Collection:
    - Shortlist: Simon Barraclough, Andrew Forster, Frances Leviston, Allison McVety, Stephanie Norgate and Kathryn Simmonds
- Jerwood Aldeburgh First Collection Prize for poetry:
  - Shortlist: Paul Batchelor, The Sinking Road (Bloodaxe Books); Ciaran Berry, The Sphere of Birds (Gallery Press); Adam Foulds, The Broken Word (Cape Poetry); Frances Leviston, Public Dream (Picador Poetry); Stephanie Norgate, Hidden River (Bloodaxe Books)
- Manchester Poetry Prize: Lesley Saunders and Mandy Coe
- National Poet of Wales: Gillian Clarke succeeds Gwyn Thomas
- National Poetry Competition : Christopher James for Farewell to Earth
- T. S. Eliot Prize (United Kingdom and Ireland): Sean O'Brien The Drowned Book (Judges: Peter Porter, W. N. Herbert and Sujata Bhatt)
  - Shortlist (announced in November 2007): Ian Duhig, Alan Gillis, Sophie Hannah, Mimi Khalvati, Frances Leviston, Sarah Maguire, Edwin Morgan, Poetry Review's Fiona Sampson, and Matthew Sweeney
- The Times/Stephen Spender Prize for Poetry Translation:
- Wigtown Poetry Competition (Scotland's largest poetry prize): Jane Weir, first prize

=== United States awards and honors ===
- Agnes Lynch Starrett Poetry Prize awarded to Cheryl Dumesnil for In Praise of Falling
- American Academy of Arts and Sciences prize for poetry: Arda Collins, Matthew Dickman, Dawn Lundy Martin, Meghan O'Rourke, Matthew Zapruder; Judges (all fellows of the Academy): Paul Muldoon, Carl Phillips, Charles Simic, C. D. Wright, and Adam Zagajewski
- AML Award for poetry to Neil Aitken for The Lost Country of Sight and Warren Hatch for Mapping the Bones of the World
- Andrés Montoya Poetry Prize awarded to Paul Martínez Pompa for My Kill Adore Him
- Dwarf Stars Award: Greg Beatty, Place Mat by Moebius
- Lenore Marshall Poetry Prize: Henri Cole for Blackbird and Wolf
- National Book Award for Poetry: Mark Doty for Fire to Fire: New and Selected Poems
- The New Criterion Poetry Prize:
- The Poetry Center Book Award (2008): – Barbara Guest (awarded posthumously) for The Collected Poems of Barbara Guest (ed. Hadley Haden Guest, Wesleyan University Press); Judge: Eileen Tabios
- Pulitzer Prize for Poetry (United States): Robert Hass for Time and Materials; and Philip Schultz for Failure
- Poet Laureate of Virginia: Claudia Emerson, two year appointment 2008 to 2010
- Rhysling Award:
  - Catherynne M. Valente, The Seven Devils of Central California
  - F. J. Bergmann, Eating Light
- Wallace Stevens Award: Louise Gluck
- PEN Award for Poetry in Translation: Rosmarie Waldrop for Lingos I – IX by Ulf Stolterfoht (Burning Deck, 2007)
- Ruth Lilly Poetry Prize : Gary Snyder
- Whiting Awards: Rick Hilles, Douglas Kearney, Julie Sheehan

==== From the Poetry Society of America ====
- Frost Medal: Michael S. Harper
- Shelley Memorial Award: Ed Roberson, Judges: Lyn Hejinian & C.D. Wright
- Writer Magazine/Emily Dickinson Award: Joanie Mackowski, Judge: Donald Revell
- Lyric Poetry Award: Wayne Miller, Judge: Elizabeth Macklin
- Lucille Medwick Memorial Award: Christina Pugh, Judge: Timothy Donnelly; finalist: Sally Ball
- Alice Fay Di Castagnola Award: Natasha Sajé, Judge: Dean Young; finalists: Kevin Prufer & James Richardson
- Louise Louis/Emily F. Bourne Student Poetry Award: Carey Powers, Judge: David Roderick; finalists: Willa Granger & Philip Sparks
- George Bogin Memorial Award: Theresa Sotto, Judge: by Prageeta Sharma
- Robert H. Winner Memorial Award: Jocelyn Emerson, Judge: by Annie Finch; finalists: Rachel Conrad & Marsha Pomerantz
- Cecil Hemley Memorial Award: Brian Henry, Judge: Norma Cole
- Norma Farber First Book Award: Catherine Imbriglio for Parts of the Mass, published by Burning Deck, Judge: Thylias Moss); finalist: Alena Hairston for The Logan Topographies, published by Persea
- William Carlos Williams Award: Aram Saroyan for Complete Minimal Poems, published by Ugly Duckling Presse; Judge: Ron Silliman; finalists: Roberta Beary for The Unworn Necklace, published by Snapshot Press; and Eileen Myles for Sorry, Tree, published by Wave Books

=== Other awards and honors ===
- Japan: Akutagawa Prize for works published in the second half of 2007: Mieko Kawakami, Chichi to Ran (乳と卵) ("Of Breasts and Eggs")

== Deaths ==
Birth years link to the corresponding "[year] in poetry" article:

- January 1 – Wanda Sieradzka de Ruig, 85, Polish author, poet, journalist and translator. (Polish)
- January 3:
  - Henri Chopin, 85, French poet
  - Petru Dugulescu, 62, Romanian Baptist pastor, poet and politician, heart attack.
  - John O'Donohue, 52, Irish poet, philosopher and priest
- January 4 – Stig Claesson (born 1928), Swedish
- January 5 – Rowan Ayers (born 1922) English television producer and poet
- January 12:
  - Ángel González Muñiz, 82, Spanish
  - Adriano González León, 76, Venezuelan writer and poet
- January 16 – Hone Tuwhare, 85, New Zealander
- January 21 – Burton Hatlen, 71, American scholar, founding member of the National Poetry Foundation, mentor and teacher to Stephen King, who promoted the work of the Objectivist poets
- February 7 – Frank Geerk (born 1946), German
- February 13 – raúlrsalinas, 73, American Chicano poet, complications of liver cancer
- February 28 – Max Nord (born 1916)) Dutch
- March 10 – Ana Kalandadze, 83, Georgian
- March 16 – Jonathan Williams, 79, American poet, publisher and founder of The Jargon Society
- March 19 – Hugo Claus (born 1929), Flemish novelist, poet, playwright, painter, film director writing primarily in Dutch
- March 23 – E. A. Markham, 68, Montserrat-born British poet and writer.
- March 26 – Robert Fagles, 74, American professor, poet and translator of ancient epics, prostate cancer.
- April 3 – Andrew Crozier, 64, English poet associated with the British Poetry Revival, with connections to American poetry, who edited volumes by American poet Carl Rakosi After Rakosi's Selected Poems, published in 1941, Rakosi dedicated himself to social work and apparently neither read nor wrote any poetry at all. A letter from Crozier to Rakosi asking about his early poetry was the trigger that started Rakosi writing again. His first book in 26 years, Amulet was published by New Directions in 1967 and his Collected Poems in 1986 by the National Poetry Foundation; of a brain tumour.
- April 13 – Robert Greacen, 87, Irish poet
- April 14 – Horst Bingel (born 1933), German writer, poet, graphic artist and publisher
- April 15 – Parvin Dowlatabadi, 84, Iranian children's author and poet, of heart attack
- April 17:
  - Aimé Césaire, 94, French-Martiniquan poet and politician
  - April 17 – Werner Dürrson (born 1932), German
  - Mikhail Tanich, 84, Russian poet, kidney problems
- April 24 – Jason Shinder, 53 (born 1955), American poet, editor, anthologist and teacher who founded the Y.M.C.A. National Writer's Voice program, one of the country's largest networks of literary-arts centers, at one time an assistant to Allen Ginsberg
- May 1 – Alberto Estima de Oliveira, 74, Portuguese poet (Portuguese)
- May 2 – Ilyas Malayev, 72, Uzbek musician, wedding entertainer and poet. "His performances in stadiums drew tens of thousands of Uzbeks, and his appeal reached beyond his native republic", according to The New York Times.
- May 19 – Rimma Kazakova, 76, Russian poet.
- May 25:
  - George Garrett, 78, American novelist and poet, cancer
  - Alejandro Romualdo, 82, Peruvian
- May 29 – Paula Gunn Allen, 68, Native American poet, novelist, and activist, lung cancer
- June 5:
  - Angus Calder (born 1942) Scottish academic, writer, historian, poet and literary editor
  - Eugenio Montejo, 70, Venezuelan poet, essayist and ambassador, of stomach cancer
- June 8 – Peter Rühmkorf (born 1929), German writer and poet
- June 11 – James Reaney (born 1926) Canadian poet, playwright and literary critic
- June 16 – Aleda Shirley (born 1955) American poet
- June 29 – William Buchan, 3rd Baron Tweedsmuir, also known as "William Tweedsmuir" (born 1916), an English peer and author of novels, short stories, memoirs and verse
- July 4 – Thomas M. Disch, 68, American poet and novelist; suicide
- July 16 – Richard Exner (born 1929) German and American poet, academic and translator who moved to the United States in 1950, then moved to Germany after his retirement
- July 19 – Samudra Gupta, 62, Bangladeshi poet, gallbladder cancer
- July 9 – Kilin, pen name of Mikiel Spiteri, 90, Maltese poet and novelist; fluent in six languages and published in English, Spanish and other languages
- July 24 – Alain Suied, 51 (born 1951), French poet, from cancer
- August 9 – Mahmoud Darwish, 67, Palestinian poet; complications following heart surgery.
- August 24 – Wei Wei, 88, Chinese poet and writer, liver cancer
- August 25 – Ahmed Faraz, pseudonym of Syed Ahmad Shah, 77 (born 1931), Pakistani Urdu-language poet and son of Agha Syed Muhammad Shah Bark Kohati, a leading traditional poet, from kidney failure
- August 28 – İlhan Berk, 89, Turkish
- September 10 – Reginald Shepherd, 44, American poet, complications from colon cancer
- September 15 – John Matshikiza, 53, South African actor, writer and poet; heart attack
- September 20 – Duncan Glen, 75, British poet, critic and literary historian
- September 28 – Konstantin Pavlov, 75 (born 1933), Bulgarian poet and screenwriter who was defiant against his country's communist regime; When censors prevented his works from being published officially in the country from 1966 to 1976, his popularity didn't wane, as Bulgarians clandestinely copied and read his poems.
- September 29 – Hayden Carruth, 87, American poet and literary critic
- September 30 – Christa Reinig (born 1926), German
- October 6 – Paavo Haavikko, 77, Finnish poet and playwright, after long illness
- October 15 – Fazıl Hüsnü Dağlarca, 94, Turkish poet; chronic renal failure
- October 25 – Tahereh Saffarzadeh, 72, Iranian poet and academic, cancer
- November 5 -- James Liddy, 74, Irish American poet, cancer.
- November 10 – Fries de Vries (1931–2008) Dutch
- November 15, – Donald Finkel, 79 (born 1929), American poet, husband of poet and novelist Constance Urdang, complications from Alzheimer's disease
- November 16 – Tibor Gyurkovics, 77, Hungarian poet, writer and publicist
- November 20 – Gyula Takáts, 97, Hungarian poet, writer and translator
- December 1 – Peter Maiwald (born 1946) German
- December 2 – Ann Darr (born 1920) American poet and World War II pilot.
- December 5 – Altaf Nia, 44, Kashmiri poet and academic
- December 10 – Dorothy Porter, 54, Australian
- December 14 – Tajal Bewas, pen name of Taj Mohammed Samoo, 70 (born 1938), bucolic Sufi poet, novelist, short-story writer, teacher and Pakistani government official
- December 15 – Jwalamukhi (pen name of Akaram Veeravelli Raghavacharya), 71 (born 1938), Indian poet and president of the India-China Friendship Association
- December 20 – Adrian Mitchell, 74, (born 1934), English poet, playwright, children's author, journalist and political activist, of heart failure
- December 22 – Nanao Sakaki (born 1923), Japanese poet and leading personality of "the Tribe", a counter-cultural group
- December 24 – Harold Pinter, 78 (born 1930), English playwright, poet, actor, theatre director, screenwriter, human rights activist, winner of the 2005 Nobel Prize for Literature

== Sources ==
- Britannica Book of the Year 2009 (events of 2008), published by the Encyclopædia Britannica, online edition (subscription required), "Literature/Year in Review 2008" section

== See also ==
- Poetry
- List of poetry awards
