= 1916 in poetry =

We know their dream; enough

To know they dreamed and are dead;
And what if excess of love
Bewildered them till they died?
I write it out in a verse—
MacDonagh and MacBride
And Connolly and Pearse
Now and in time to be,
Wherever green is worn,
Are changed, changed utterly:

A terrible beauty is born.

—Closing lines of "Easter, 1916" by W. B. Yeats

Nationality words link to articles with information on the nation's poetry or literature (for instance, Irish or France).

== Events ==
- February 5 – Cabaret Voltaire is opened by German performance poet Hugo Ball and his future wife Emmy Hennings in the back room of Ephraim Jan's Holländische Meierei in Zürich, Switzerland; although surviving only until the summer it is pivotal in the creation of the Dada movement in art, poetry and literature. Tristan Tzara, Marcel Janco, Richard Huelsenbeck, Sophie Taeuber-Arp and Jean Arp are among those who gather here to discuss art and put on performances expressing their disgust with World War I and the interests they believe have inspired it.
- March
  - Guillaume Apollinaire (Wilhelm Apollinaris de Kostrowitzky) is wounded in the head by shell fragments while serving as a lieutenant in the French infantry on the Western Front (World War I).
  - The first poems of English children's author Enid Blyton are published, in Nash's Magazine.
- March 10 – Sir Hubert Parry writes the choral setting of William Blake's poem "And did those feet in ancient time" (c.1804-08) which becomes known as "Jerusalem" (first performed 28 March at the Queen's Hall, London).
- March 30 – Don Marquis introduces the characters Archy and Mehitabel in his "The Sun Dial" column in The Evening Sun (New York City); archy is a poetry-writing cockroach unable to operate the typewriter shift key.
- April 24–30 – Easter Rising in Ireland: Members of the Irish Republican Brotherhood proclaim an Irish Republic and the Irish Volunteers and Irish Citizen Army occupy the General Post Office and other buildings in Dublin before surrendering to the British Army. Of the seven leaders of the Rising (subsequently executed), Thomas MacDonagh, Patrick Pearse and Joseph Plunkett are all poets and James Connolly a balladeer. The event is the theme of W. B. Yeats' poem "Easter, 1916", first published this September.
- July 1
  - First day on the Somme: Poets W. N. Hodgson, Will Streets, Gilbert Waterhouse, Henry Field, Alfred Ratcliffe, Alexander Robertson and Bernard White are among the 19,000 British soldiers killed on this day alone. The Battle of the Somme continues until October 18, during which time American poet Alan Seeger (serving with the French), English poet Edward Tennant, and short-story writer H. H. Munro ("Saki") are killed, Robert Graves is seriously wounded (believed killed), David Jones receives physical and psychological injuries, Ford Madox Hueffer suffers concussion and shellshock, A. A. Milne and J. R. R. Tolkien are invalided out, Siegfried Sassoon wins the Military Cross, and Cameron Highlander Dòmhnall Ruadh Chorùna composes the Scottish Gaelic love song An Eala Bhàn ("The White Swan") in the oral literature tradition.
  - W. B. Yeats makes his fifth and final proposal of marriage to the newly widowed Maud Gonne in France.
- c. July–December – Poets Terence MacSwiney and Darrell Figgis are among Irish republicans detained in Reading Gaol (England) following the Easter Rising.
- July 14 – Hugo Ball recites the Dada manifesto in Zürich.
- August 17 – English poet F. W. Harvey becomes a prisoner of war.
- September 10 – Wilfrid Gibson becomes the last of the Dymock poets to leave the area of Dymock in England.
- October 6 – Romanian poet and critic Perpessicius loses his right arm while fighting in a skirmish at Muratan.
- When Wallace Stevens' job as a lawyer for a New York City insurance company is abolished as a result of mergers, he joins the home office of Hartford Accident and Indemnity Company and moves to Hartford, Connecticut, where he will remain the rest of his life.

== Works published in English ==
=== Australia ===
- C. J. Dennis, The Moods of Ginger Mick
- Joseph Furphy and Kate Baker, The Poems of Joseph Furphy
- Leon Gellert, "Anzac Cove"
- Will H. Ogilvie, The Australian and Other Verses

=== Canada ===
- Bliss Carman, April Airs: A Book of New England Lyrics, Boston: Small, Maynard and Co.; Canadian poet published in the United States
- Thomas O'Hagan, Songs of Heroic Days, Toronto: McClelland, Goodchild and Stewart
- Marjorie Pickthall, The Lamp of Poor Souls and Other Poems.
- Duncan Campbell Scott, Lundy's Lane and Other Poems, including "The Height of Land"
- Frederick George Scott, In the Battle Silences: Poems Written at the Front (Toronto: Musson)
- Robert W. Service, Rhymes of a Red Cross Man.

=== United Kingdom ===
From Before Action
by W. N. Hodgson

I, that on my familiar hill
Saw with uncomprehending eyes
A hundred of thy sunsets spill
Their fresh and sanguine sacrifice,
Ere the sun swings his noonday sword
Must say good-bye to all of this; –
By all delights that I shall miss,
Help me to die, O Lord.

-- last verse; produced two days before the poet's death at the First day on the Somme
- Laurence Binyon, The Anvil, and Other Poems
- Edmund Blunden, Pastorals
- Robert Bridges (ed.), The Spirit of Man: an anthology in English & French from the philosophers & poets, made by the Poet Laureate in 1915
- Émile Cammaerts, New Belgian Poems: Les trois rois et autres poèmes, expatriate Francophone Belgian poet translated into English
- Mary Gabrielle Collins, Branches unto the Sea
- Elizabeth Daryush, Verses
- W. H. Davies:
  - Child Lovers, and Other Poems
  - Collected Poems
- Eleanor Farjeon, Nursery Rhymes of London Town
- Robert Graves, Over the Brazier
- Thomas Hardy, Selected Poems
- F. W. Harvey, A Gloucestershire Lad At Home and Abroad
- Aldous Huxley, The Burning Wheel
- D. H. Lawrence, Amores
- Joseph Lee, Ballads of Battle, Scottish poet
- Winifred Mary Letts, Hallow-e'en and Poems of the War (including "The Spires of Oxford")
- Charlotte Mew, The Farmer's Bride
- Jessie Pope, Simple Rhymes for Stirring Times
- Cecil Roberts, Collected War Poems
- Lady Margaret Sackville, The Pageant of War
- Dorothy L. Sayers, Op. 1
- Edith Sitwell and Osbert Sitwell, Twentieth Century Harlequinade, and Other Poems
- The first Wheels poetry anthology Wheels 1916 edited by the Sitwells.
- Cicily Fox Smith, Fighting Men
- Charles Hamilton Sorley, Marlborough and Other Poems (posthumous)
- Muriel Stuart, Christ at Carnival and Other Poems
- Rabindranath Tagore, Fruit Gathering, lyrics translated by the author into English from the original Bengali (Indian poetry in English)
- Edward Tennant, Worple Flit and other poems (posthumous)
- Edward Thomas, Six Poems, his first published poetry (under the pen name 'Edward Eastaway')
- Aelfrida Tillyard, The Garden and the Fire
- Katharine Tynan, The Holy War
- Gilbert Waterhouse, Rail-Head and other poems (posthumous)
- Evelyn Waugh, The World to Come: A Poem in Three Cantos (written at age 12; privately printed)
- Anna Wickham, The Man With A Hammer
- Alfred Williams, War Sonnets and Songs
- W. B. Yeats, Irish poet published in the United Kingdom:
  - "Easter, 1916"
  - Responsibilities and Other Poems
  - Reveries Over Childhood and Youth
- Some Imagist Poets second anthology

=== United States ===
From The Road Not Taken
by Robert Frost

I shall be telling this with a sigh
Somewhere ages and ages hence:
Two roads diverged in a wood, and I—
I took the one less traveled by,
And that has made all the difference.

-- last verse (lines 16-20)
- Pauline B. Barrington, "Education" published in The Masses as "Toy Guns"
- Conrad Aiken:
  - Turns and Movies
  - The Jig of Forslin
- James Branch Cabell, From the Hidden Way
- Florence Earle Coates (1850–1927), Poems (collected edition in two volumes)
- J. W. Cunliffe, editor, Poems of the Great War
- H.D. (Hilda Doolittle), Sea Garden
- John Gould Fletcher, Goblins and Pagodas
- Robert Frost, Mountain Interval, including "The Road Not Taken" and "Out, Out—"
- Edgar A. Guest, A Heap o' Livin'
- Robinson Jeffers, Californians
- Sarah Orne Jewett, Verses, published posthumously (died 1909)
From Chicago
by Carl Sandburg

Hog Butcher for the World,
Tool Maker, Stacker of Wheat,
Player with Railroads and the Nation's Freight Handler;
Stormy, husky, brawling,
City of the Big Shoulders:

They tell me you are wicked and I believe them, for I have

seen your painted women under the gas lamps luring
the farm boys.

And they tell me you are crooked and I answer: Yes it is

true I have seen the gunman kill and go free to kill again.

-- Lines 1-7
- Alfred Kreymborg, Mushrooms
- Amy Lowell, Men, Women and Ghosts
- Edgar Lee Masters:
  - Songs and Satires
  - The Great Valley
- Emanuel Morgan and Anne Knish, both pen names, Spectra: A Book of Poetic Experiments
- James Oppenheim, War and Laughter
- Josephine Preston Peabody, Harvest Moon
- Ezra Pound, Lustra
- Edward Arlington Robinson, The Man Against the Sky
- Carl Sandburg, Chicago Poems, Holt, Rinehart and Winston; including "Chicago"
- Alan Seeger, Poems

=== Other in English ===
- W. Walter Gill, Juan-y-Pherick’s Journey and Other Poems, Isle of Man
- N. C. Rai, An Indian Tale, a tale of rural life; Calcutta; India, Indian poetry in English
- Rabindranath Tagore, Fruit Gathering lyrics translated by the author into English from the original Bengali; India, Indian poetry in English
- W. B. Yeats, Irish poet published in the United Kingdom:
  - "Easter, 1916"
  - Responsibilities and Other Poems
  - Reveries Over Childhood and Youth

== Works published in other languages ==
=== France ===
- Jean Cocteau, Discours du Grand Sommeil, a poem written after experience as a Red Cross ambulance driver at the Belgian front in World War I
- Francis Jammes, Cinq prières pour le temps de la guerre, Paris: Librairie de l'Art catholique
- Pierre Reverdy, La Lucarne ovale

=== Indian subcontinent ===
Including all of the British colonies that later became India, Pakistan, Bangladesh, Sri Lanka and Nepal. Listed alphabetically by first name, regardless of surname:

- B. Tirumal, Angala jarmani-yuddha vivaranam, Sanskrit-language epic poem on World War I (India)
- Kavikondala Venkata Rao, Vividha Kusumavali, Telugu-language (India), a collection of khandikas
- Lalchand Amardinomal Jagatiani, Sunharo Sacal, Sindhi-language essays of criticism and biography on the life and work of Sachal Sarmast, a Sindhi poet (India)
- Lekhnath Ponday, Rtuvicar, Nepali-language
- Rabindranath Thakur, Balaka, Bengali-language (India)
- Rayaprolu Subba Rao, editor, Andhravali, a Telugu-language anthology (India)

=== Other ===
- Olav Aukrust, Himmelvarden, Norwegian poet writing in Nynorsk
- Hugo Ball, "Karawane", German poet in Switzerland writing in nonsense words
- José María Eguren, La canción de las figuras, Peru
- Albert Ehrenstein, Der Mensch schreit and Nicht da nicht dort, Germany
- Yvan Goll, Requiem pour les morts de l’Europe, German poet in Switzerland writing in French
- Nikolay Gumilyov, The Quiver, Russia
- Vicente Huidobro, Adán, Chile
- Joseph Lenoir-Rolland, Poèmes épars, lyrics; French language; Canada
- Antonio Machado, Campos de Castilla (revised edition), Spain
- Vladimir Mayakovsky, The Backbone Flute (Fleyta pozvonochnik) and War and the World (Voina i mir), Russian
- 1914–1916: Eine Anthologie, Germany
- Martinus Nijhoff, De wandelaar, Netherlands
- Sergei Yesenin, Radunitsa (Радуница, "Ritual for the Dead"), his first book of poetry, Russian

== Births ==
Death years link to the corresponding "[year] in poetry" article:

- January 10
  - William Buchan, 3rd Baron Tweedsmuir, also known as "William Tweedsmuir" (died 2008), English peer and author of novels, short stories, memoirs and verse
  - Bernard Binlin Dadié (died 2019), Ivorien author and politician
- January 12 – Mary Wilson (died 2018), English prime ministerial spose and poet
- February 1 – Venibhai Purohit (died 1980), Indian, Gujarati-language
- February 4 – Gavin Ewart (died 1995), English
- February 10 – Thomas Blackburn (died 1977), English
- March 7 – Balmukund Dave (died 1993), Indian, Gujarati-language poet
- March 11 – Jack Clemo (died 1994), English poet of Cornwall
- May 9 – Helen Haenke (died 1978), Australian poet and playwright
- June 14 – John Ciardi (died 1986), American poet, translator and etymologist
- June 15 – Hari Daryani, "Dilgir" (died 2004), Indian, Sindhi-language poet
- July 6 – Harold Norse (died 2009), American poet and memoirist; writes seminal memoir of the Beat poets in Paris
- August 1
  - Anne Hébert (died 2000), Canadian, French language
  - Val Vallis (died 2009), Australian
- August 29 – Rhydwen Williams (died 1997), Welsh poet, novelist and minister of religion
- September 8 – Philip O'Connor (died 1998), English writer and surrealist poet
- September 13 – John Malcolm Brinnin (died 1998), American poet and literary critic
- September 24 – W. J. Gruffydd (Elerydd) (died 2011), Welsh
- September 25 – Paul Roche (died 2007), English poet, translator and academic associated with the Bloomsbury Group
- October 10 – Samar Sen, সমর সেন (died 1987), Bengali poet and journalist
- October 16 – David Gascoyne (died 2001), English author and poet
- November 23 – P. K. Page (died 2010), Canadian
- December 14 – Harold Stewart (died 1995), Australian
- December 21 – Maurice Chappaz (died 2009), Swiss, French-language poet, travel writer, translator and author
- Also:
  - Ghulam Nabi Aziz (died 1965), Indian, Kashmiri-language poet, nephew of Abdul Ahad Azad
  - Jnanindra Barma (died 1990), Indian, Oriya-language poet
  - Ghulam Nabi Dilsoz (died 1941), Indian, Kashmiri-language poet
  - Margaret Irvin, Australian
  - Sheikh Davud Kavi, Indian, Telugu-language poet, scholar and translator
  - Sankeevani Marathi, Indian, Marathi-language
  - Dina Nath Kaul Nadim (died 1987), Indian, Kashmiri-language poet
  - Felix Paul Noronha, Indian, Marathi-language poet in the Konkani dialect
  - Lal Chand Prarthi (died 1982), Indian, Dogri-language Pahadi poet and editor
  - Tom Rawling (died 1996), English poet and angler
  - Pinakin Thakore, Indian, Gujarati-language poet
  - Pritam Singh Safir (died 1999), Indian, Punjabi-language poet
  - Raghunath Vishnu Pandit (died 1990), Indian, Konkani language poet also writing in Marathi, modernist poet, novelist, short-story writer and essayist
  - Takis Varvitsiotis (died 2011), Greek poet

== Deaths ==
Note "Killed in World War I" subsection, below. Birth years link to the corresponding "[year] in poetry" article:

- February 7 – William Little (born 1839), English-born Australian
- February 12 – John Townsend Trowbridge (born 1827), American poet and author
- March 11 – Duncan MacGregor Crerar (born 1836), Scottish
- April 26 – Mário de Sá-Carneiro (born 1890), Portuguese-born poet and novelist, suicide
- July 1? – Arabella Eugenia Smith (born 1844), American
- August 27 – Petar Kočić (born 1877), Bosnian Serb
- October 7 – James Whitcomb Riley (born 1849), American
- October 21 – Olindo Guerrini (born 1845), Italian
- October 25 – John Todhunter (born 1839), Irish poet and playwright
- November 27 – Emile Verhaeren (born 1855), Belgian French language Symbolist poet
- December 9 – Natsume Sōseki 夏目 漱石 (commonly referred to as "Sōseki"), pen name of Natsume Kinnosuke 夏目金之助 (born 1867), Japanese Meiji Era novelist, haiku poet, composer of Chinese-style poetry, writer of fairy tales and a scholar of English literature; from 1984–2004, his portrait will feature on the 1000 yen note
- Also:
  - Sacchindananda Tribhuban Deb (born 1872), Indian Oriya-language poet, patron of Oriya literature and ruler of Bamanda, a feudal state in Sambalpur District
  - Asad Pare, Indian, Kashmiri-language, Sufi

=== Killed in World War I ===
- January 24 – H. Rex Freston (born 1891), English poet
- January 27 – C. Morton Horne (born 1885), Irish-born musical comedy performer, writer and war poet
- May 31 – Gorch Fock (born 1880), German poet and novelist
- July 1 – First day on the Somme:
  - W. N. Hodgson (born 1893), English war poet
  - Will Streets (born 1886), English war poet
  - Gilbert Waterhouse (born 1883), English architect and war poet, second lieutenant in 2nd Bn Essex Regiment
- July 4 – Alan Seeger (born 1888), American poet who joined the French Foreign Legion in 1914 and died in battle, cheering on his fellow soldiers after being hit; uncle of American folk singer Pete Seeger
- September 9 – Tom Kettle (born 1880), Irish writer and politician
- September 22 – Edward Tennant (born 1897), English war poet
- November 14 – H. H. Munro ("Saki"; born 1870), English poet, short story writer, novelist and playwright
- December 3 – Geoffrey Bache Smith (born 1894), English poet

== Awards and honors ==
- Nobel Prize for Literature: Carl Gustaf Verner von Heidenstam, Swedish poet and novelist

== See also ==
- List of years in poetry
- Dada
- Imagism
- Modernist poetry in English
- Silver Age of Russian Poetry
- Ego-Futurism movement in Russian poetry
- Expressionism movement in German poetry
- Young Poland (Polish: Młoda Polska) modernist period in Polish arts and literature
- Poetry
