= Ovenbird (disambiguation) =

Ovenbird is the common name for two sets of bird species:

- Ovenbird: an English common name for birds in the South American genus Furnarius
- Ovenbird: a small songbird of a New World warbler family: Parulidae.
- Ovenbird (family): a large group of birds in the family Furnariidae
- "The Oven Bird", a 1916 poem by Robert Frost
