= Jane Griffiths =

Jane Griffiths may refer to:

- Jane Griffiths (actress) (1929–1975), British actress
- Jane Griffiths (poet) (born 1970), British poet
- Jane Griffiths (politician) (born 1954), British Labour party MP 1997–2005
