= Birches (poem) =

Poem by Robert Frost

- by Robert Frost
- First published in: The Atlantic Monthly
- Country: United States
- Language: English
- Publication date: August 1915
- Media type: Magazine

Full text
- Birches at Wikisource

"Birches" is a poem by American poet Robert Frost. First published in the August 1915 issue of The Atlantic Monthly together with "The Road Not Taken" and "The Sound of Trees" as "A Group of Poems". It was included in Frost's third collection of poetry Mountain Interval, which was published in 1916.

Consisting of 59 lines, it is one of Robert Frost's most anthologized poems. Along with other poems that deal with rural landscape and wildlife, it shows Frost as a nature poet.

== Text ==
When I see birches bend to left and right
Across the lines of straighter darker trees,
I like to think some boy's been swinging them.
But swinging doesn't bend them down to stay
As ice-storms do. Often you must have seen them
Loaded with ice a sunny winter morning
After a rain. They click upon themselves
As the breeze rises, and turn many-colored
As the stir cracks and crazes their enamel
Soon the sun's warmth makes them shed crystal shells
Shattering and avalanching on the snow-crust —
Such heaps of broken glass to sweep away
You'd think the inner dome of heaven had fallen.
They are dragged to the withered bracken by the load,
And they seem not to break; though once they are bowed
So low for long, they never right themselves:
You may see their trunks arching in the woods
Years afterwards, trailing their leaves on the ground
Like girls on hands and knees that throw their hair
Before them over their heads to dry in the sun.
But I was going to say when Truth broke in
With all her matter-of-fact about the ice-storm
I should prefer to have some boy bend them
As he went out and in to fetch the cows —
Some boy too far from town to learn baseball,
Whose only play was what he found himself,
Summer or winter, and could play alone.
One by one he subdued his father's trees
By riding them down over and over again
Until he took the stiffness out of them,
And not one but hung limp, not one was left
For him to conquer. He learned all there was
To learn about not launching out too soon
And so not carrying the tree away
Clear to the ground. He always kept his poise
To the top branches, climbing carefully
With the same pains you use to fill a cup
Up to the brim, and even above the brim.
Then he flung outward, feet first, with a swish,
Kicking his way down through the air to the ground.
So was I once myself a swinger of birches.
And so I dream of going back to be.
It's when I'm weary of considerations,
And life is too much like a pathless wood
Where your face burns and tickles with the cobwebs
Broken across it, and one eye is weeping
From a twig’s having lashed across it open.
I'd like to get away from earth awhile
And then come back to it and begin over.
May no fate willfully misunderstand me
And half grant what I wish and snatch me away
Not to return. Earth's the right place for love:
I don't know where it's likely to go better.
I'd like to go by climbing a birch tree,
And climb black branches up a snow-white trunk
Toward heaven, till the tree could bear no more,
But dipped its top and set me down again.
That would be good both going and coming back.
One could do worse than be a swinger of birches.

== Summary ==
When the speaker (the poet himself) sees a row of bent birches in contrast to straight trees, he likes to think that some boy has been swinging them. He then realizes that it was not a boy, rather an ice storm that had bent the birches. On a winter morning, freezing rain covers the branches with ice, which then cracks and falls to the snow-covered ground. The sunlight refracts on the ice crystals, making a brilliant display.

When the truth strikes the speaker, he still prefers his imagination of a boy swinging and bending the birches. The speaker says he also was a swinger of birches when he was a boy and wishes to be so now. When he becomes weary of this world, and life becomes confused, he would like to go toward heaven by climbing a birch tree and then coming back again, because earth is the right place for love.

== Analysis ==
This poem is written in blank verse, with a particular emphasis on the "sound of sense". For example, when Frost describes the cracking of the ice on the branches, his selections of syllables create a visceral sense of the action taking place: "Soon the sun's warmth makes them shed crystal shells / Shattering and avalanching on the snow crust — / Such heaps of broken glass to sweep away..."

Originally, this poem was called "Swinging Birches", a title that perhaps provides a more accurate depiction of the subject. In writing this poem, Frost was inspired by his childhood experience with swinging on birches, which was a popular game for children in rural areas of New England during the time. Frost's own children were avid "birch swingers", as demonstrated by a selection from his daughter Lesley's journal: "On the way home, i climbed up a high birch and came down with it and I stopped in the air about three feet and pap cout me."

== Overview ==
Written in conversational language, the poem constantly moves between imagination and fact, from reverie to reflection. In the opening, the speaker employs an explanation for how the birch trees were bent. He is pleased to think that some boys were swinging them when he is suddenly reminded that it is actually the ice-storm that bends the trees. Thus, the poem makes some shift of thought in its description. An abrupt shift occurs when the speaker yearns to leave this earth because of its confusion and make a heaven-ward journey. But the speaker does not want to die by leaving earth forever. He wants to come back to this earth, because to the speaker, the earth is, though not perfect, a better place for going on. The speaker is not one who is ready to wait for the promise of afterlife. The love expressed here is for life and himself. This shows Frost's agnostic side where heaven is a fragile concept to him. This becomes clear when he says, "the inner dome of heaven had fallen."

Rich metaphoric thinking and imagery abound in the poem, where Frost presents some sharp descriptions of natural phenomena.

== Form ==
The poem is written in blank verse. The language is conversational (use of first person "I" and second person "You".)
