= Dumars =

Dumars or DuMars is a surname. Notable people with the surname include:

- David Dumars (born 1957), American football player
- Joe Dumars (born 1963), American basketball player and administrator
- Susan Millar DuMars (born 1966), Irish-American poet
