= Out, Out— =

Poem by Robert Frost

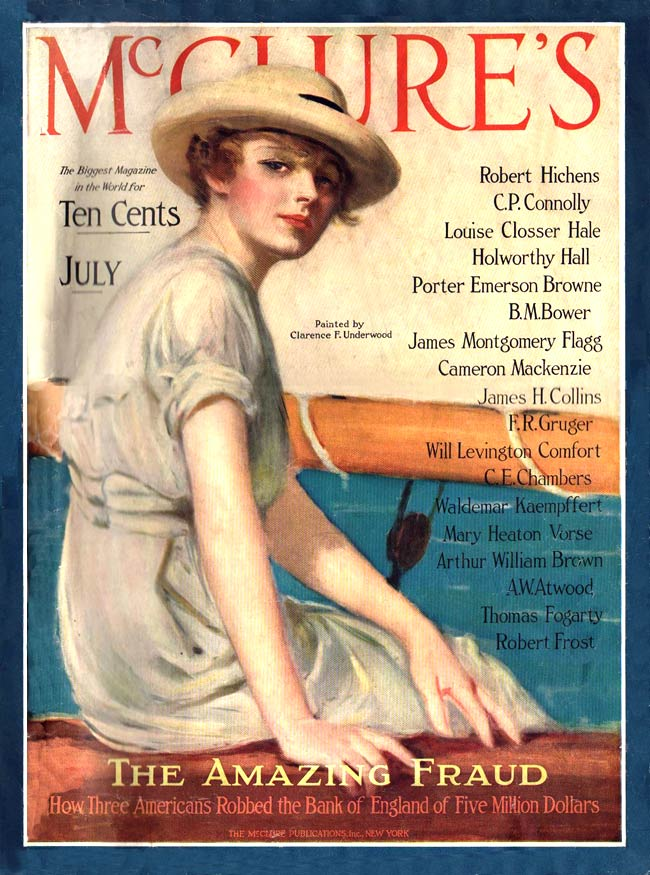
"Out, Out—" first appeared in McClure's, July 1916.

"Out, Out—" is a 1916 single stanza poem authored by American poet Robert Frost, relating the accidental death of a young man, with references to Shakespeare's Macbeth.

== Background ==
The poem was written in memory of a neighbour's son, whom Frost had befriended while living in Franconia, New Hampshire. Fitzgerald had died on March 24, 1910, after an accident similar to the accident related in "Out, Out—".

The poem was first published in the July 1916 issue of McClure's before being included in the collection Mountain Interval.

== Text ==
The buzz saw snarled and rattled in the yard
And made dust and dropped stove-length sticks of wood,
Sweet-scented stuff when the breeze drew across it.
And from there those that lifted eyes could count
Five mountain ranges one behind the other
Under the sunset far into Vermont.
And the saw snarled and rattled, snarled and rattled,
As it ran light, or had to bear a load.
And nothing happened: day was all but done.
Call it a day, I wish they might have said
To please the boy by giving him the half hour
That a boy counts so much when saved from work.
His sister stood beside him in her apron
To tell them ‘Supper.’ At the word, the saw,
As if to prove saws knew what supper meant,
Leaped out at the boy’s hand, or seemed to leap—
He must have given the hand. However it was,
Neither refused the meeting. But the hand!
The boy’s first outcry was a rueful laugh,
As he swung toward them holding up the hand
Half in appeal, but half as if to keep
The life from spilling. Then the boy saw all—
Since he was old enough to know, big boy
Doing a man’s work, though a child at heart—
He saw all spoiled. ‘Don’t let him cut my hand off—
The doctor, when he comes. Don’t let him, sister!’
So. But the hand was gone already.
The doctor put him in the dark of ether.
He lay and puffed his lips out with his breath.
And then—the watcher at his pulse took fright.
No one believed. They listened at his heart.
Little—less—nothing!—and that ended it.
No more to build on there. And they, since they
Were not the one dead, turned to their affairs.

== Analysis ==
"Out Out—" tells the story of a young boy who dies after his hand is severed by a "buzz-saw". The poem focuses on people's reactions to death, as well as the death itself, one of the main ideas being that life goes on. The boy lost his hand to a buzzsaw and bled so much that he went into shock, dying in spite of his doctor's efforts. Frost uses personification to great effect throughout the poem. The buzz saw, although technically an inanimate object, is described as a cognizant being—"snarling" repeatedly, as well as "leaping" out at the boy's hand in excitement.

Frost concentrates on the apparent innocence and passivity of the boy—which is relevant to the time period—as Frost was forced to move back to America due to war in Britain just a year before the poem was written. Bearing this in mind, the poem can be read as a critique as to how warfare can force innocent, young boys to leave their childhood behind, and ultimately be destroyed by circumstances created by the "responsible" adult.

The title of the poem is an allusion to William Shakespeare's tragedy Macbeth ("Out, out, brief candle ..." in the "Tomorrow and tomorrow and tomorrow" soliloquy). Macbeth is shocked to hear of his wife's death and comments on the brevity of life; it refers to how unpredictable and fragile life is.

The poem uses figurative language including onomatopoeia, alliteration, imagery, and many others. Harold Bloom noted that it is "one of Frost's most respected poems, but it has not received the same depth of critical attention and explication as poems such as 'The Road Not Taken' and 'Stopping by Woods on a Snowy Evening.'"

== Sources ==
- Nancy Lewis Tuten; John Zubizarreta (2001). The Robert Frost Encyclopedia. Greenwood Publishing Group. ISBN 978-0-313-29464-8.
- Jay Parini (2000). Robert Frost: A Life. Macmillan. ISBN 978-0-8050-6341-7.
- Jeffrey Meyers (1996). Robert Frost: a biography. Houghton Mifflin. ISBN 9780395856031.
