= Mountain Interval =

1916 poetry collection written by Robert Frost

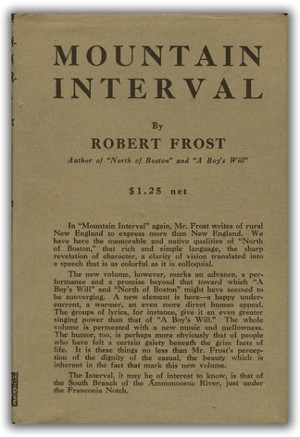
- First edition cover
- Author: Robert Frost
- Genre: Poetry collection
- Published: 1916
- Publisher: Henry Holt
- Preceded by: North of Boston (1914)
- Followed by: Selected Poems (1923)

Mountain Interval is a 1916 poetry collection by American poet Robert Frost. Published by Henry Holt, it is Frost's third poetic volume.

== Background ==
The book was republished in 1920, and after making several alterations in the sequencing of the collection, Frost released a new edition in 1924. Five lyrics of the earlier collection were compiled next under the title "The Hill Wife". In this volume only three poems are written in dramatic monologue.

== Poems ==
- "The Road Not Taken"
- "Christmas Trees"
- "An Old Man's Winter Night"
- "The Exposed Nest"
- "A Patch of Old Snow"
- "In the Home Stretch"
- "The Telephone Machine"
- "Meeting and Passing"
- "Hyla Brook"
- "The Oven Bird"
- "Bond and Free"
- "Birches"
- "Pea Brush"
- "Putting in the Seed"
- "A Time to Talk"
- "The Cow in Apple Time"
- "The Encounter"
- "Range-Finding"
- "The Hill Wife"
- "The Bonfire"
- "A Girl's Garden"
- "Locked Out"
- "The Last Word of a Blue Bird"
- "Out, Out—"
- "Brown's Descent, or the Willy-nilly Slide"
- "The Gum-Gatherer"
- "The Line-Gang"
- "The Vanishing Red"
- "Snow"
- "The Sound of Trees"
- "Assertive"

== See also ==
- 1916 in poetry
- Robert Frost
