= Denise Roger =

French composer (1924-2005)

Denise Isabelle Roger (21 January 1924 – 15 November 2005) was an award-winning French composer who wrote both instrumental and vocal works.

Roger was born in Colombes, Hauts-de-Seine in the northwest suburbs of Paris. She entered the Paris Conservatoire in 1933 at age nine to study composition, piano and voice. Her teachers included Jean Batella, Henri Busser, Jeanne Chapard, the brothers Jean Gallon and Noel Gallon, Yvonne Lefebure, Marguerite Long and Mme Massart.

Roger received several first prizes in music:

- 1934 Paris Conservatoire;
- 1942 Paris Conservatoire;
- 1948 Paris Conservatoire; and
- 1952 Concours International in Geneva.

Roger set works by the following writers to music for solo and ensemble voices: Guillaume Apollinaire, Jean-Antoine de Baif, Robert Brasillach, Paul Claudel, Johann Wolfgang von Goethe, Friedrich Hoelderlin, Hugo von Hofmannsthal, Andre Maurel, Gerard de Nerval, Rainer Maria Rilke, Arthur Rimbaud, Pierre de Ronsard, Alain Suied, Georg Trakl, and Paul Verlaine.

Roger’s compositions were published by Southern Music. Her works included:

== Chamber ==
- Ciselures (brass quintet)
- Climats (brass quintet)
- Jeux de Cuivre (solo tuba)
- Sonatine (flute and piano)
- Souvenance (tuba and piano)
- String Quartets No. 1 and 2
- Supplique et Polychromie (brass quintet)
- Three Romances (clarinet and piano)

== Orchestra ==
- Concertino (oboe and orchestra)
- Concerto (piano and orchestra)
- Symphony for Strings

== Piano ==
- Five Pieces
- Petite Romance

== Vocal ==
- many songs based on texts by others
