= Alain Suied =

French poet and translator (1951–2008)

- Born: 17 July 1951; Tunis, Tunisia
- Died: July 24, 2008 (aged 57)
- Occupations: Poet; translator

Alain Suied (July 17, 1951 – July 24, 2008) was a French poet and translator.

== Early life and career ==
Suied was born in Tunis into what was then the Jewish community in that city. In 1959 he moved to Paris with his parents. His first poem was published in 1968 in the journal L'Ephemeral. Andre du Bouchet helped him get his first book published in 1970. Suied received the Nelly Sachs Prize for translation. French composer Denise Roger (1924–2005) used Suied's text for some of her songs.

He is buried in the cemetery of Montparnasse.
