= Aleda Shirley =

American poet

Aleda Shirley (May 2, 1955 – June 16, 2008) was an American poet.

Some of Shirley's earlier works were published by Kentucky Foundation for Women's literary journal The American Voice.

== Life ==
Aleda Shirley received fellowships from the National Endowment for the Arts, the Mississippi Arts Commission, and the Kentucky Arts Council. Her poems appeared in such places as The American Poetry Review, Kenyon Review, Poetry, and Virginia Quarterly Review. At her death in June 2008 she lived in Jackson, Mississippi.

Her debut book of poems, Chinese Architecture, (University of Georgia Press), won the Poetry Society of America's Norma Farber First Book Award in 1987. As Library Journal stated: “The polished, controlled surfaces of the poems in this artful first collection belie what lies beyond: a passionate dialogue of antagonists—parents and child, lover and deceiver, silence and speech, light and dark. ... Shirley pays close attention to craft, and her language resonates with an honesty and openness to experience that is both seductive and refreshing.”

Shirley's second poetry collection, Long Distance, received the following starred review in the September 30, 1996, issue of Publishers Weekly: “The idea that ‘America may always be more a passage than a place’ is explored with kaleidoscopic resonance and cut-glass clarity in this moving second collection by Mississippi poet Shirley. . . . Throughout, both time and space are evocatively shape-shifting dimensions, as when, on a drive through Oklahoma, ‘That road seemed like the future: an emptiness / that could turn, at any moment, into beauty.’ With a seemingly common first-person speaker throughout, these poems invoke love, its loss and an ever-shadowing solitude against an ever-shifting setting (from dusty Texas to the eerily romantic, poolside setting of ‘Tropical Deco’). Shirley grounds the numinous in palpable detail (a poem about the Mexican Day of the Dead describes ‘. . .the rooms rich with the smell of bread, pan de los muertos, / lemon-colored loaves shaped in the swelling oval / of a human soul’). Reminiscent of poems of the late Richard Hugo, Shirley's measured lyric language and seamless craftsmanship reveal the offroad intimacies and profundities of the American landscape.”

Miami University Press editor James Reiss described his reasons for publishing her second book, Long Distance: “What I love about Shirley’s poems are their accessibility, the way they bring in popular science, Spanish, French en passant, and especially their poignant down-home quality, as if they arise like smoke from hearths in Kentucky (or Mississippi) where single women endure and prevail. F. Scott Fitzgerald wasn’t entirely accurate when he famously said, ‘There are no second acts in American lives.’ Aleda Shirley has disproved him with her brilliant second book.”

== Works ==
- Chinese Architecture, 1986
- Long Distance, 1996
- Dark Familiar, 2006
