= Duncan MacGregor Crerar =

Scottish poet (1836-1916)

Duncan MacGregor Crerar (4 December 1836 – 11 March 1916) was a Scottish poet who spent much of his adult life in western Ontario and New York City, writing sentimental poetry commemorating places and friends in Scotland. A native Gaelic speaker, he wrote primarily in English, with Gaelic phrases and diction. He was referred to by some contemporaries as "The Breadalbane Bard" or "Bard of Amulree". In his book Scottish Poets in America (New York, NY, 1889), John D. Ross described him:

In conclusion, we would state that Mr. Crerar is one of the most genial of men, kind, sympathetic, and generous in all his actions. In his own quiet, unobtrusive way, and unknown to the world, he has rendered assistance to many when they found the clouds of adversity hovering over them: and there are few men similarly circumstance who can boast of so large and so sincere a following of friends.

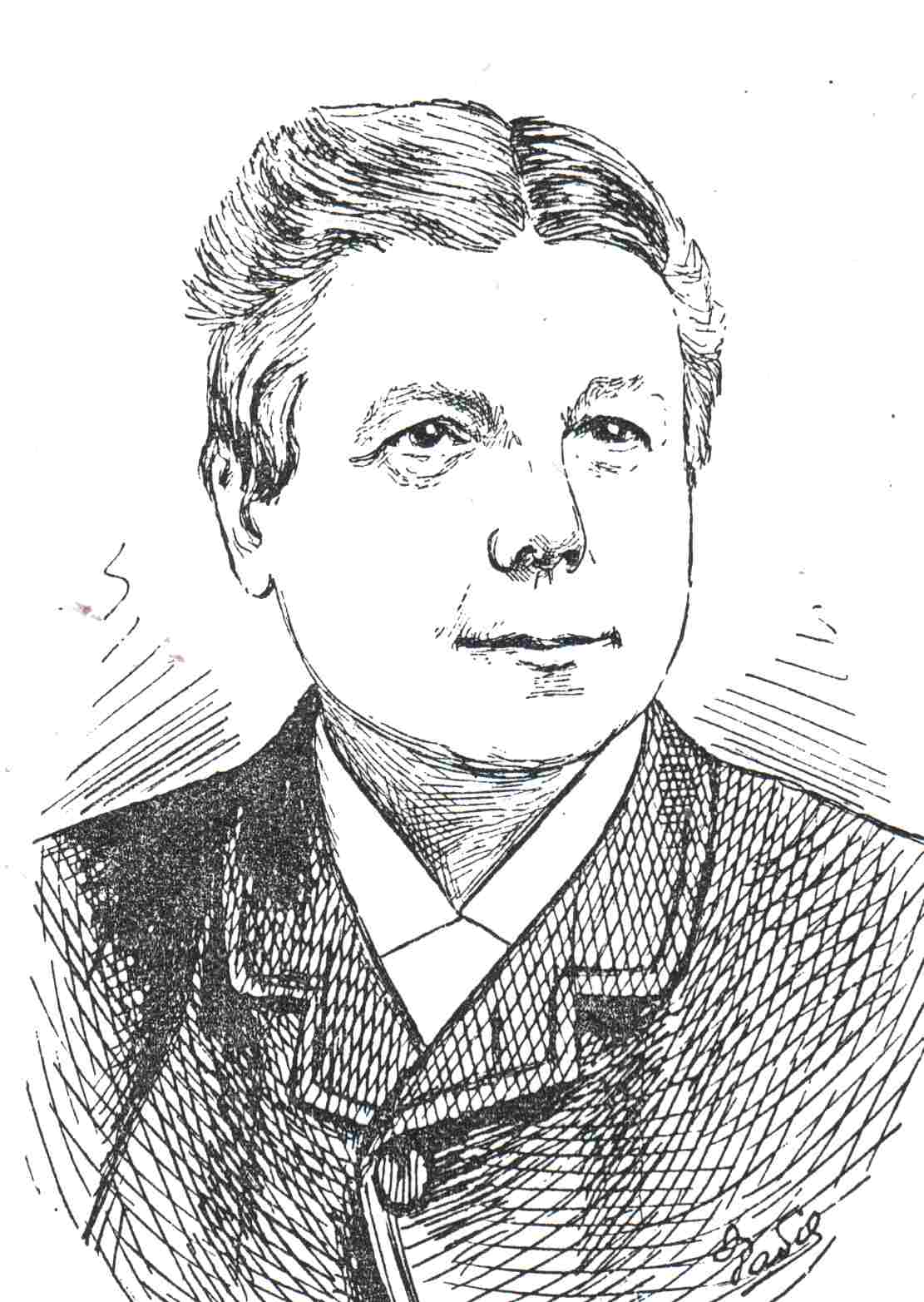
Duncan MacGregor Crerar

== Parents ==
Crerar was born in Amulree, Glenquaich, Perthshire, Scotland, the son of Alexander Crerar (or MacKintosh) (1801 – before 1861), a mason and shepherd, and Janet MacGregor (1810 – 15 August 1885). His son eulogized him in his poem "Mementoes of My Father's Grave", written on 1 November 1878 in New York, and dedicated to Duncan's brother Alexander M. Crerar (born 9 July 1849) (published in the Celtic Magazine, Inverness, January 1883):

Mementoes of My Father's Grave

Soft, silky leaves of freshest green,
Which grew upon my father's grave;
Mementoes hallowed of a man
Whose heart was warm, sincere, and brave.

Of humble sphere, but noble aims,
He calmly stemmed life's stormy sea;
Upright and manly, frank and pure,
A trusty friend, and true was he.

A loving husband, faithful, kind;
A tender father, wise, discreet;
Our weal his chief concern, delight,
His happy home made labour sweet.

His words were few; for well he weighed
Each thought and subject ere he spoke;
In humour rich; and oft essayed
A simple, pleasant, harmless joke.

My father! thy blest memory
I dearly cherish day by day;
And for its sake I'll prize these leaves,
Which grew about thy sacred clay.

And when life's course with me is run --
When, soon or late, I must resign
This earthly frame-oh, may it rest
Beneath a turf as green as thine!

He eulogized his mother Janet in the poem, "S'Rioghal Ma Dhream" ("My Race is Royal"—Motto of Clan MacGregor), "In Affectionate Remembrance of My Beloved Mother. Died at Amulree, Dunkeld, Scotland, August 15, 1885", written 25 August 1885 in New York City:

"Mother is dead!" heart-rending news to me.
Dead my belovèd! Oh how keen my pain!
On earth, alas! we ne'er shall meet again:
"Mother is dead!" sent o'er the cold, deep sea!
"My Race is Royal," motto of thy line;
If Royal here, they welcome Royal there,
Where, free from every sorrow, trouble, care,
Thou dwellest in the light and love Divine!
To me henceforth this life will lonesome be.
Deep was thy love, self-sacrificing, kind.
Now do I feel all that thou wert to me,
Since thou art gone and I am left behind.
In gloomy sadness mourns for thee thy son.
Father, forgive: Thy will, not mine, be done!

== Birth ==
Duncan MacGregor Crerar was born at Amulree, Glenquaich, Perthshire on 4 December 1837 [Perth Pamphlets, v.18]. He received a good education, studying under Robert Sinclair, and was destined by his parents to join the Presbyterian ministry. He abandoned these intentions, however, on the death of his father.

== Emigration to North America ==
In 1857 he went to Canada, where he worked “in mercantile pursuits”. There he met many former friends from Amulree. Soon after his arrival, he entered the Active Militia as a member of Company "A" of Perth, Ontario, and served on the frontier during the Fenian Raids of 1865. John Ross states that "...in recognition of his valuable services, the Canadian Government, when under the direction of his warm friend, the Honourable Alexander Mackenzie, gazetted him Honorary Lieutenant of the company with which he served." [John Ross, Scottish Poets in America, 37]. It is probable that Crerar had known Mackenzie, a future Canadian Prime Minister, for a long time, as both came from Dunkeld, Perthshire.

After his military service, Crerar wrote for The Stratford Beacon, in Stratford, Ontario. He went to Toronto and studied for a short session. He then left for New York City, where he furthered his journalistic career. At the time of his marriage in 1869 he was the Assistant Manager of the Scottish American Journal of New York.

He returned to Scotland to wed. On 4 August 1869, he married Jessie Anderson Campbell (born circa 1842 - died before 1916) at the Free Church Manse, of Bridge of Perth, Kilmadock, Perth. Jessie Anderson Campbell was the 27-year-old daughter of Donald Campbell, a hotelkeeper of Langton, and Mary Campbell.

Crerar resided in New York until around 1905. Poems written after 1905 indicate that he returned to Scotland to live out his life. He dedicated several of these later poems to citizens of Crieff, where he spent his final years.

In religion, he was a liberal Presbyterian, attending regularly the Fifth Avenue Presbyterian Church, led by the Reverend Dr. Hall. In Canada he joined the Free Masons, and was an officeholder in the Blue Lodge and Royal Arch. He was also a founding and active member of the Burns Society of New York City.

== Death ==
Crerar died in Crieff, Perthshire, Scotland at age 79. He was found in his bed at home at Westview, Burrell Street at 8:30 in the morning. It was recorded that he was the widower of Jessie Campbell. His occupation was recorded as poet, and an annuitant of an Andrew Carnegie Trust. His brother Donald of Aberfoyle reported the death.

== Poetic works ==
Crerar is perhaps best remembered for his Robert Burns, an Anniversary Poem, (London, M. Ward, 1885), which "... was read before the Burns Society of New York at the celebration of the 126th anniversary of the birthday of the Scottish National Bard":

Excerpt from “A Poem Commemorating Robbie Burns”

He touched our country’s ancient harp
With truest patriotic fire;
Forth thrilling came soul-stirring strains,
Man’s nobler actions to inspire.
The cottar’s fireside, ‘neath his spell,
Becomes at once a hallowed shrine;
His hymn to Mary swells the heart,
And fills the eye his Auld Lang Syne.
* * * * * *
Not to his native land alone
His genius and his fame belong,
In other climes is treasured dear
His matchless legacy of song.
His melodies have echoing gone
To continents and isles afar;
They cheer and gladden hearts alike
‘Neath Southern Cross and Polar Star.

In 1890, he published Whistle Blinkie: A Collection of Songs for the Social Circle (Glasgow: David Robertson & Co., 1890).

Another poem receiving some further reference was "My Bonnie Rowan Tree", dedicated to his brother John Crerar, and written in New York on September 25, 1876:

“Thrice welcome sweet green spray
Culled from my Rowan Tree,
By loved ones far away,
In Bonnie Amulree.

In Boyhood’s days thy root
Was planted by my hand;
Just ere I left my dear,
My Scottish fatherland.

Thou but a sapling then,
Though now a sheltering tree,
While warblers in thy boughs,
Sing sweetest melodies.

One boon for which I pray,
A home in Amulree,
Where friends of yore I'd meet,
Beneath thee, Rowan Tree.

The Freuchie wimpling by,
In cadence soft and slow,
Graig Thullich tow’ring high,
The fragrant woods below.

The old Kirke on the Knowe,
The graveyard mossy green,
The mossy birks, Lubchuil,
The Streamlet’s silvery sheen.

With warm Breadalbane hearts
‘Mong those romantic braes,
I happily could spend,
The gloaming of my days.

The memories of Langsyne,
Bright days of gladsome glee,
We fondly could revive,
Beneath the Rowan Tree.”

[in History of the Pioneers of North Easthope; Alex. Muir Mackenzie, Taketties & Tyres in Strathbraan: at 28; the Celtic Magazine (Inverness), Nov. 1882)]

“Caledonia’s Bonnie Blue Bells”, written in New York, September 23, 1881, recounts his visit to his family's now-deserted croft, and discovering his father's bed now exposed to the Scottish elements:

Hail, bonnie Blue Bells ! ye come hither to me
With a brother’s warm love from far o’er the sea;
Fair dowerets ! ye grew on a calm, sacred spot --
The ruins alas ! of my kind father’s cot
Caledonia’s Blue Bells, O bonnie Blue Bells !

What memories dear of that cot ye recall,
Though now there remains neither rooftree nor wall !
Alack a-day ! lintel and threshold are gone,
While cold ‘neath the weeds lies the hallowed hearthstone !
Caledonia’s Blue Bells, O bonnie Blue Bells !

‘Twas a straw-roofed cottage, but love abode there,
And peace and contentment aye breathed in its air;
With songs from the mother, and legends from sire,
How blithe were we all round the cheerie peat fire!
Caledonia’s Blue Bells, O bonnie Blue Bells !

Our sire long asleep, his fond mem’ry endeared;
The mother still spared us, beloved and revered;
Sweet Blue Bells with charmed recollections entwined
Of scenes in my childhood forever enshrined.
Caledonia’s Blue Bells, O bonnie Blue Bells !

[Celtic Magazine, February 1882; Alex. Muir Mackenzie, Taketties & Tyres in Strathbraan, at 26]

A stanza of Caledonia's Bonnie Blue Bells is quoted in William Black's 1894 novel Stand Fast, Craig Royston. The reciter, George Bethune, a "garrulous" elderly Scotsman expatriate, states of the author:

"That was written by the Bard of Amulree, your lordship...and a truer Scotchman does not breathe, though America has been his home nearly all his life..."

Music for Crerar's poem "The Eirlic Well" (“Inscribed, with sincere esteem, to the Edinburgh Breadalbane Association, New York, September 1880”) was composed by Archibald Menzies, S.S.C. Edinburgh. The Eirlic Well pours a rill into Girron Burn at Amulree. Girron Burn flows into the Fraochie (Braan), which merges with the Tay at the foot of Birnam Hill, Dunkeld. [Alexander Muir Mackenzie, Taketties & Tyres in Strathbraan, page 27]

Published poems included the following. To Alma, Marchioness of Breadalbane (New York, October 29, 1880) [From the Perthshire Advertiser September 11, 1882]; To-Morrow (New York, September 5, 1882) [from Celtic Magazine, October 1883]; A Spray of White Heather (Inscribed, with Esteem and Gratitude, to Mrs. William Black, New York, September 29, 1882) [Celtic Magazine, March 1883]; In Memoriam Hugh MacGregor, Born at Amulree, Perthshire July 12, 1812; died at Brucefield, Ontario, Canada, July 25, 1883; A Birthday Greeting, Inscribed with Sincere Regard, To the Right Honourable, The Marquis of Breadalbane, on his Birthday, April 9, 1884 (New York, 1884); To Robert Gordon, Esq., on the occasion of his Departure from New York, May 17, 1884 (concerning a prominent banker in New York who returned to Scotland upon his retirement); Eadal Gu La! ("Sleep on till day")(dedicated to Duncan's brother John (b. 1829 - d 30 May 1886, age 57, Amulree, Glenquaich), and written in New York on 14 June 1886); Sung Into Heaven! (Occasioned by the death of David Kennedy, the Scottish vocalist, who died at Stratford, Ontario on 13 October 1886); “The Black Watch Memorial at Aberfeldy”, (The Highland Monthly, March 1890, No. 12 Vol. I); 'Lonely Strath Naver' [The Celtic Monthly, vol. VIII 1900. pp. 170 & 171]; Sithchaillion (“Inscribed, with sincere regards, to my beloved fellow-Canadian, Donald Cameron, esq., formerly of Windsor, Canada, now of Drimfern, Bridge of Allan, Perthshire, Crieff, Scotland, July 7, 1905”); The Golden Gloaming's Calm (“Inscribed to Mr. and Mrs. Alexander Crerar, Crieff, on the occasion of their Golden Wedding, July 1, 1907”); Saoghal fada sona Dhuibh ! (Long life and happiness be thine!) (“To Alexander Maclean, esq., Inspector of Police, Crieff, on his birthday, November 8th, 1907”); Glad Hearts be Round thy Cheerie Fire (“Inscribed to William P. Thomson, esq., Crieff, January 14, 1909”); and Glenquaich [from the Celtic Magazine; in Mary Louise McLennon, History of the Pioneers of North Easthope]

Other poems include: “To William Black, Poet and Novelist”, “A Christmas Greeting to Mr. and Mrs. James Brand,” “My Hero True Frae Bennachie,” “A Guid New Year,” addressed to Mr. Thomas Davidson Brown, “To Mr. William Drysdale, of Montreal,” “The Victory Won,” “In Memoriam: Jane Jardine Marsh,” “A Full Blown Flower,” “A Bridal Greeting,” and “The Orange Wreath for Heaven’s Crown,” these last three bound together and issued privately as an “In Memoriam Souvenir” of the late Mrs. Fuller, daughter of Mr. and Mrs. Watson [Ross, 36]. and “In Memoriam: Lieutenant T.J. Graham-Stirling, who fell at Tel-el-Kebir”.

== Sources ==
- John D. Ross, Scottish Poets in America (New York, NY, 1889)
- Duncan MacGregor Crerar, Whistle Blinkie: A Collection of Songs for the Social Circle (Glasgow: David Robertson & Co., 1890)
- Alexander Muir Mackenzie, Taketties & Tyres in Strathbraan
- Mary Louise McLennan, History of the Pioneers of North Easthope
