= The Oven Bird =

Poem by Robert Frost

"The Oven Bird" is a 1916 poem by Robert Frost, first published in Mountain Interval. The poem is written in sonnet form and describes an ovenbird singing.

== Background ==
It has been described as a quintessential Frost poem. Several Frost biographers and critics have interpreted the poem as autobiographical. Harold Bloom argues that the bird in Frost is "at best a compromised figure" who learns in singing not to sing.

== Text ==
There is a singer everyone has heard,
Loud, a mid-summer and a mid-wood bird,
Who makes the solid tree trunks sound again.
He says that leaves are old and that for flowers
Mid-summer is to spring as one to ten.
He says the early petal-fall is past
When pear and cherry bloom went down in showers
On sunny days a moment overcast;
And comes that other fall we name the fall.
He says the highway dust is over all.
The bird would cease and be as other birds
But that he knows in singing not to sing.
The question that he frames in all but words
Is what to make of a diminished thing.
