= Pritam Singh Safir =

- Born: 1916; Malikpur, Rawalpindi (now in Pakistan)
- Died: 1999 (aged 82–83); Delhi, India
- Occupations: Poet, judge of the Delhi High Court
- Writing career
- Language: Punjabi
- Notable work: Katak Koonjan (Swallows of Kartik)

Pritam Singh Safir (1916–1999) was an Indian poet of the Punjabi language. He wrote with classical sensibility imbued with modernism.

== Life ==
Pritam Singh Safir was born at Malikpur in Rawalpindi district, now in Pakistan. His father, Sardar Mehtab Singh was teacher, and a leading Sikh political activist. Safir passed his graduation from Khalsa College, Amritsar. Then he went to Law College, Lahore. after completing his degree there he started practice in 1938. After Partition he moved to Delhi Bar, where he became the Judge of the High Court, Delhi, in 1969.

== Publications ==
- Panj natak (a collection of one-act plays, 1939)

=== Poetry ===
- Katak Koonjan (Swallows of Kartik, 1941)
- Pape de Sohile (In Praise of Sin, 1943)
- Rakat Boondan (Drops of Blood, 1946)
- Aad Jugaad (Ever Eternal, 1955)
- Sarab Kala (Omnipotent, 1966)
- Guru Gobind (1966)
- Anik Bistar (Panoramic Creation, 1981)
- Agam Agochar (Beyond Reach, 1981)
- Sanjog Vijog (Union and Parting, 1982)
- Sarab Nirantar (All Pervading, an omnibus volume containing all his works, 1987)
- Ape Bauh Rangi (Of many Splendours)

=== prose works ===
- Dhur ki Bani (The Song Divine, The only prose work in Punjabi,1975)
- Ten Holy Masters and Their Commandments (1980)
- The Tenth Master (1983)
- A Study of Bhai Veer Singh's Poetry (1985)
