= Alberto Estima de Oliveira =

Portuguese poet (1934–2008)

Alberto Estima de Oliveira (July 1, 1934 – May 1, 2008) was a Portuguese poet. He was born in Lisbon, moved to Benguela, Angola in 1957, and later to Guinea Bissau. He lived in Macao from 1982 to 2004.

== Selected works ==
- Vector II
- Vector III
- Kuzuela III – 1.ª Antologia de Poesia Africana de Espressão Portuguesa
- Tempo de Angústia (Angola, 1972)
- Infraestructuras (Macao, 1987)
- Diálogo do Silêncio (Macao, 1988)
- Rosto (Macao, 1990)
- Corpo (Con)Sentido (Macao, 1993)
- Esqueleto do Tempo (Macao, 1995)
- O Sentir (Macao, 1996)
- Infraestruturas (Kei Tcho) (Macau, 1999) (bilingual Portuguese, Chinese)
- MESOPOTAMIA – espaço que criei (Lisboa, 2003)

== Awards ==
- 1999: INTERNATIONAL GRAND PRIZE FOR POETRY at The International Festival “Curtea de Arges Poetry Nights”, Romania
