= Ciaran Berry =

Irish-American poet

- Born: 15 November 1971 (age 54); Dublin, Ireland
- Education: New York University
- Writing career
- Genre: Poetry

Ciaran Berry (born 15 November 1971) is an Irish-American poet.

== Life ==
Born in Dublin, Berry grew up in Carna, County Galway, and Falcarragh, County Donegal.

He graduated from New York University, a New York Times Fellow. He teaches at Trinity College, Hartford.

His work appeared in Gulf Coast, AGNI, Crazyhorse, The Missouri Review, The Threepenny Review, Gettysburg Review, Green Mountains Review, Ontario Review, and Notre Dame Review.

== Awards ==
- 2007 Crab Orchard Award
- Jerwood Aldeburgh first collection prize
- 2012 Whiting Award

== Bibliography ==
=== Poetry ===
==== Collections ====
- Berry, Ciaran (2008). The Sphere of Birds. Southern Illinois University Press. ISBN 9780809328383. OCLC 836596491.
- — (2013). The Dead Zoo. The Gallery Press. ISBN 9781852355692. OCLC 864085140.
- — (2018). Liner Notes. The Gallery Press. ISBN 9781911337478. OCLC 1053582826.

==== List of poems ====
| Title | Year | First published | Reprinted/collected |
|---|---|---|---|
| Electrocuting an elephant | | | Berry, Ciaran (2008). The sphere of birds. Southern Illinois University Press.; Wright, Charles, ed. (2008). The best American Poetry 2008. Scribner. ISBN 9780743299756.; Poem of the Week - 25 January 2009 |

=== Critical studies and reviews of Berry's work ===
- Cooke, Belinda (June–July 2014). "Nasty, brutish and short". The London Magazine: 99–104. Review of The dead zoo.
