= Wanda Sieradzka de Ruig =

Polish author, journalist, poet and translator

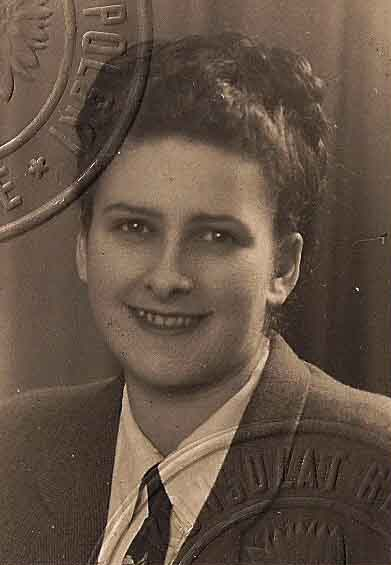
Wanda Sieradzka de Ruig, before 1948

Wanda Sieradzka de Ruig (29 September 1923, Łódź, Poland – 1 January 2008, Haarlem, Netherlands) was a well known Polish author, journalist, poet and translator.

Sieradzka graduated from the Institut d'Etudes Francaises in Toulouse, France. She worked as a press liaison for the group, Section VI, at the Command Staff headquarters of the Armia Krajowa in Warsaw during World War II. She wrote for the office under the pseudonym, "Elżbieta."

She was first published as a poet in 1945 in a Polish magazine, which was published in Switzerland. She worked as a Polish diplomat in the 1940s following the end of World War II.

She later worked as a journalist from 1950 until 1960. In 1960, Sieradzka made a career switch to television when she was hired as a producer in the music and variety department of Polish Television. She remained at the station until her retirement in 1988. She often translated screenplays, television scripts and theater plays into Polish for use on television.

Her grave is located in the Jewish cemetery on Okopowa Street in Warsaw.

== Personal life ==
Sieradzka married her Dutch husband, J.A. de Ruig, in 1986, living for many years with him in Haarlem.
