= Philip Schultz =

American poet and teacher

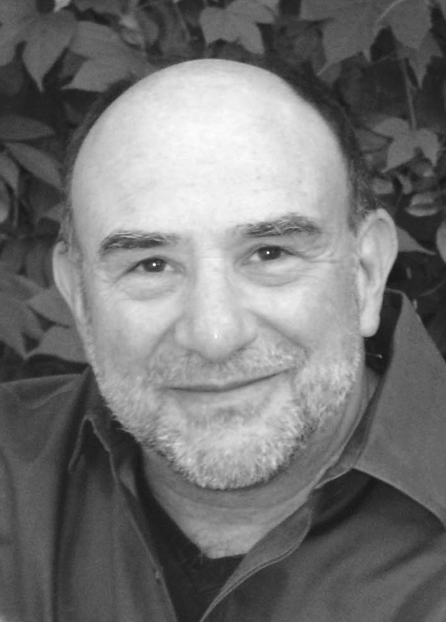
- Born: January 6, 1945 (age 81); Rochester, New York, U.S.
- Education: University of Louisville; San Francisco State University (BA); University of Iowa (MFA)
- Spouse: Monica Banks
- Children: 2
- Writing career
- Notable works: Failure; Like Wings; My Dyslexia
- Notable awards: Pulitzer Prize for Poetry; Guggenheim Fellowship; Lamont Poetry Selection
- Website: writerstudio.com

Philip Schultz (born 1945 in Rochester, New York) is an American poet. His poetry collection Failure won the 2008 Pulitzer Prize for Poetry. Schultz is also the founder and director of The Writers Studio, a private school for fiction and poetry writing based in New York City.

== Biography ==
A graduate of the Iowa Writers' Workshop, his work has been published in The New Yorker, The Paris Review, Slate, Poetry magazine, The Gettysburg Review, The Southern Review, and Five Points, among others, and he is the recipient of a Fulbright Fellowship in Poetry to Israel and a 2005 Guggenheim Fellowship in Poetry.

Amongst other honors, Schultz has received a National Endowment for the Arts Fellowship in Poetry (1981), a New York Foundation for the Arts Fellowship in Poetry (1985), and the Levinson Prize from Poetry magazine.

Schultz is the author of The Wherewithal, published in February 2014, and two memoirs: My Dyslexia (2011) and Comforts of the Abyss: The Art of Persona Writing (2022). He is the author of several collections of poetry, including The God of Loneliness, Selected and New Poems (2010); Failure (2007): winner of the 2008 Pulitzer Prize in Poetry; Living in the Past (2004); and The Holy Worm of Praise (Harcourt, 2002).

He is also the author of Deep Within the Ravine (1984), which was the Lamont Poetry Selection of the Academy of American Poets; Like Wings (1978, winner of an American Academy & Institute of Arts and Letters Award as well as a National Book Award nomination), and the poetry chapbook, My Guardian Angel Stein (1986).

== Bibliography ==
- Like Wings, Viking Penguin, 1978
- Deep Within the Ravine, Viking Penguin, 1984
- My Guardian Angel Stein, State Street Press, 1986
- The Holy Worm of Praise, Harcourt, 2002
- Living in the Past, Harcourt, 2004
- Failure, Harcourt, 2007
- The God of Loneliness: Selected and New Poems, Houghton Mifflin Harcourt, 2010
- My Dyslexia, W. W. Norton & Company, 2011
- The Wherewithal, W. W. Norton & Company, 2014
- Luxury, W.W. Norton & Company, 2018
- Comforts of the Abyss, W.W. Norton & Company, 2022
- Enormous Morning, W.W.Norton & Company, 2026
