= Frances Leviston =

British poet (born 1982)

Frances Leviston (born 1982) is a British poet.

== Biography ==
Born in Edinburgh, Scotland, Frances Leviston later moved to Sheffield. She studied at St Hilda's College in Oxford University, where she read English. Leviston then began an MA in creative writing at Sheffield Hallam University, winning their Ictus Prize in 2004, which led to the publication of her first pamphlet, Lighter. She won an Eric Gregory Award, for poets under 30 years of age, in 2006. Her first collection, Public Dream, was published by Picador in 2007 and shortlisted for the T. S. Eliot Prize. Her second collection, Disinformation, also from Picador, was published in February 2015. Leviston's short story "Broderie Anglaise" was shortlisted for the BBC National Short Story Award 2015 and broadcast on BBC Radio 4.

Her first novel, The Voice in My Ear, was published in 2020.

Leviston is Senior Lecturer in Creative Writing at the University of Manchester.

== Selected works ==
=== Novels ===
- The Voice in My Ear, 2020

=== Poetry collections ===
- Public Dream, 2007
- Disinformation, 2015

=== Poems ===
- "High force", 2019
