= Jason Shinder =

American poet

Jason Shinder (1955–2008) was an American poet who authored three books and founded the YMCA National Writer's Voice. His last book, Stupid Hope (Graywolf Press, 2009), was released posthumously.

He was born in Brooklyn, New York, in 1955 and graduated from Skidmore College in 1978. He published his first literary work in 1993, with the release of Every Room We Ever Slept In, which became a New York Public Library Notable Book. He went on to author Among Women and Uncertain Hours. He also edited numerous anthologies, including The Poem That Changed America: "Howl" Fifty Years Later (2006) and The Poem I Turn To: Actors and Directors Present Poetry That Inspires Them (2008). In addition to founding and directing the National Writer's Voice, Shinder also served as director of the Sundance Institute Writing Program, as a teacher in the graduate writing program at Bennington College, and as a graduate teacher at New School University. He was also a Poet Laureate of Provincetown. Shinder earned a Literature Fellowship from the National Endowment for the Arts in 2007.

Shinder died in April 2008. He had non-Hodgkin's lymphoma and leukemia. "Cancer is a tremendous opportunity," he said, philosophically, "to have your face pressed right up against the glass of your mortality." In his brief poem "Company," he writes:

I've been avoiding my illness

because I'm afraid

I will die and when I do,

I'll end up alone again.

== Published works ==
Full-length Poetry Collections

- Stupid Hope (Graywolf Press, 2009)
- Among Women (Graywolf Press, 2001)
- Every Room We Ever Slept In (Sheep Meadow Press, 1993)

Chapbooks

- Uncertain Hours (Arrowsmith Press, 2006)
