= Kevin Higgins (poet) =

Irish poet (1967–2023)

- Born: 1967; London, England
- Died: 10 January 2023 (aged 55–56); Galway, Ireland
- Occupation: Poet

Kevin Higgins (1967 – 10 January 2023) was an Irish poet.

== Early life and education ==
At the age of 15 he joined Galway West Labour Party, and became a member of the local Labour Youth section.

== Activity ==
Higgins lived in London in the late 1980s where he was active in the "anti-poll tax movement". He lived in Galway from the mid-1990s, and with his wife, Susan Millar DuMars, co-organised the Over The Edge literary events in Galway City. He also facilitated poetry workshops at the Galway Arts Centre; taught creative writing at the Galway Technical Institute and National University of Ireland, Galway, and was Writer-in-Residence at Merlin Park Hospital. He was, with Michael S. Begnal, a founding co-editor of literary magazine The Burning Bush.

Higgins's first collection of poems, The Boy With No Face, was published by Salmon Poetry in February 2005. This was short-listed for the 2006 Strong Award for Best First Collection by an Irish Poet. His second collection of poems, Time Gentlemen, Please, was published in March 2008 by Salmon. In an interview in March 2008 he sharply criticised the contemporary left. Some of the poems in Time Gentlemen, Please were in turn criticised by the Socialist Workers Party. However, others on the left have praised his work. His fourth book, The Ghost In The Lobby, was published by Salmon in 2014.

He won the 2003 Cúirt Festival Poetry Grand Slam and was awarded a literature bursary by the Arts Council of Ireland in 2005. Higgins is primarily a satirical poet. His poetry is discussed in Justin Quinn's Cambridge Introduction to Modern Irish Poetry.

In 2009, Higgins and his wife Susan Millar DuMars were the subject of a short documentary by Des Kilbane called 'Rhyming Couplet', which was screened at the 2009 Galway Film Fleadh.

In August 2010, Higgins contributed to an ebook collection of political poems entitled Emergency Verse - Poetry in Defence of the Welfare State, edited by Alan Morrison.
