= Susan Millar DuMars =

Irish-American poet and author (born 1966)

Susan Millar DuMars (born 1966) is an Irish-American poet and short fiction author.

== Biography ==
Millar DuMars was born in Philadelphia in 1966, where she was raised in Philadelphia by her mother, who originated from Belfast. In 1997, she visited Galway during the Galway Arts Festival, and has since made the city her home. Her husband is the poet Kevin Higgins, and the couple have organised the 'Over the Edge' reading series. The pair have also facilitated creative writing workshops throughout Galway since 2003. Millar DuMars also teaches creative writing to students in the National University of Ireland, Galway.

DuMars wrote her first poem in school at the age of 8, which was later published in 1994. Her work has been published in several anthologies in the U.S. and Europe, including The Best of Irish Poetry 2010. As for education, Dumars attended college at Hampshire College, Massachusetts. She then went on to the University of San Francisco and got her Masters of Arts degree.

In 2009, DuMars and Higgins were the subject of a short documentary by Des Kilbane called 'Rhyming Couplet', which was screened at the 2009 Galway Film Fleadh. DuMars is featured on the Irish podcasting site www.podcasts.ie where she talks about her work and what makes her write, and also reads from her poetry collection. In 2020, DuMars received a bursary from the Irish Arts Council to enable her to complete work on her second book of short stories, a themed collection titled Cameos.

== Selected works ==
Selected works by DuMars include:

- American Girls, 2007;
- Big Pink Umbrella, 2008;
- Dreams for Breakfast, 2010;
- Lights in the Distance 2010;
- The God Thing, 2013;
- Bone Fire, 2016;
- Naked: New and Selected Poems, 2019.
