= Paul Batchelor =

British poet

- Born: 1977 (age 48–49); Northumberland, England
- Education: University of East Anglia; Newcastle University
- Occupation: Poet
- Writing career
- Language: English
- Notable awards: Eric Gregory Award (2003)
- Website: paulbatchelor.co.uk

Paul Batchelor (born 1977) is a British poet.

He was educated at the University of East Anglia (MA Creative Writing, 2000), and completed his PhD at Newcastle University. In 2003 he received an Eric Gregory Award from the Society of Authors.

His publications include 'The Sinking Road' (Bloodaxe Books, 2008), 'The Love Darg' (Clutag, 2014), and 'The Acts of Oblivion' (Carcanet, 2021). Batchelor lectures at Durham University.

== Awards ==
- 2003 Eric Gregory Award
