= David Orr (journalist) =

American journalist, attorney, and poet (born 1974)

David Orr (born 1974) is an American journalist, attorney, and poet who is noted for his reviews and essays on poetry.

Orr grew up in Columbia, South Carolina. He earned a bachelor's degree in English literature from Princeton University in 1996, and subsequently a J.D. degree from Yale Law School. While still a law student, Orr published a review in Poetry Magazine. While practicing law, Orr has written reviews and essays for Poetry Magazine, The New York Times, and other periodicals. Orr was awarded the 2004 Nona Balakian Citation for Excellence in Reviewing of the National Book Critics Circle. In 2005, he became a columnist for the New York Times Sunday Review of Books, where his On Poetry column appears occasionally. He was the Hodder Fellow at Princeton University in 2006-2007.

Several of Orr's poems have been published in Poetry Magazine. In 2011, he published Beautiful & Pointless: A Guide to Modern Poetry, of which Craig Morgan Teicher has written, "David Orr, the New York Times Book Review's poetry columnist as well as a poet, is a guide after my own heart as he seeks not just to initiate the uninitiated in his new book, Beautiful & Pointless, but also to hold a mirror up to the poetry world itself."
