= Juan-y-Pherick's Journey and Other Poems =

1916 collection of poems by W. Walter Gill

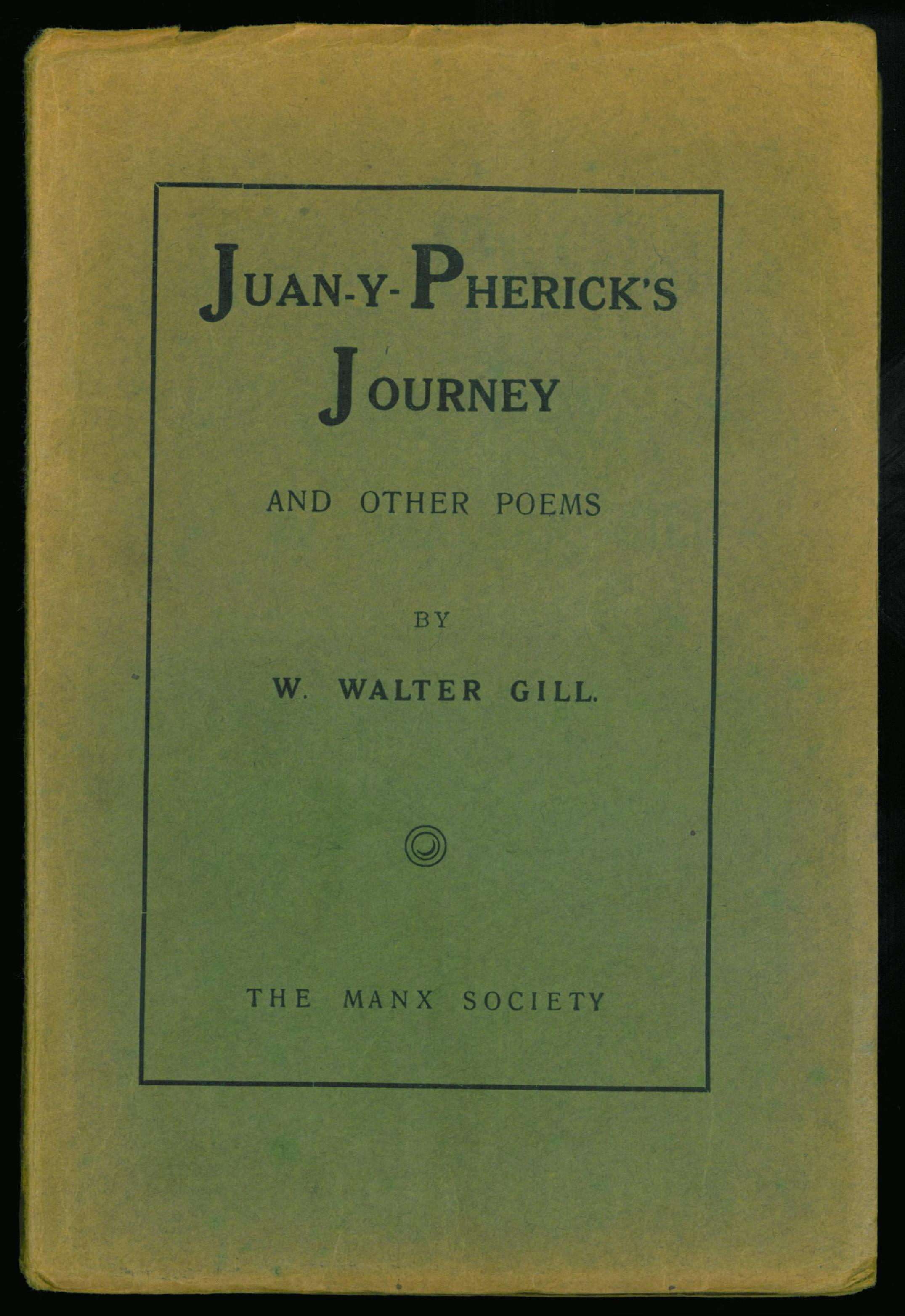
- Front cover
- Author: W. Walter Gill
- Language: English
- Genre: Poetry
- Publisher: Louis G. Meyer, Douglas, Isle of Man
- Publication date: 1916
- Publication place: Isle of Man
- Media type: Print (paperback)
- Pages: 38 pp

Juan-y-Pherick's Journey and Other Poems is a 1916 collection of poems by W. Walter Gill. The book was published by Yn Çheshaght Gailckagh, the Manx Society, and is Gill's only collection. It is a significant contribution to the literature of the Isle of Man, as there are few other individual poetry collections from this period.

At the time of the books' release, Gill was serving as a private in active service in World War I. The release was conceived of partly as an extension of Manx literature and culture, being, as it was, the only poetry collection released by the Manx Society other than William Cubbon's selection, A Manx Poetry Book. But it was also used as a fundraiser for the war effort, as was announced at its release:

"The book is issued with the object of earning money wherewith the Manx Society may be enabled to send music, reading matter and comforts to Manx soldiers and sailors on active service or in training, and to that purpose the gross receipts from sales will be devoted."

The book contained 31 poems, seven of which had appeared in print before: 'Lament of the Mother Tongue' and 'The Ould Times' in Mannin (Volumes I and V), and 'Friends', 'Vespers', 'A Fancy', 'To an Exile', 'Exile to Exile' and 'Lament of the Mother Tongue' in A Book of Manx Poetry edited by William Cubbon. Two of the poems were based on others' work; 'Inscription for a Crucifix' is a translation of Victor Hugo, and 'Lament of the Mother Tongue' is a verse version of W. J. Cain's literal translation from the Manx of William Kennish's 'Dobberan Çhengey ny Mayrey' which was first published in 1840.

The poems are predominantly pensive or melancholic in mood, with winter or night as recurring settings or themes for nearly half of the collection. Other key themes include nature and the landscape, home and exile, and a foreboding of mortality. In contrast to other poetry and writing from the Isle of Man at this time, Gill's collection is striking for its relative absence of overt nationalism or sentimentality. This was commented on questioningly in a review in Mannin, the journal of The Manx Society, upon the book's release in 1916:

"Mr Gill's verses are not ostensibly and ostentatiously 'Manxy.' He uses the dialect sparingly, and a little unsurely, and he cannot produce the sympathetic intimate personal sketches which have so endeared 'Cushag' to us all."

Despite such controlled reviews of the book upon its release, it came to be considered by Mona Douglas, one of the leading figures of the Manx Cultural Revival, to be Gill's 'best and most original contribution to Manx Culture', even over his highly renowned Manx Scrapbooks.

One example of the tone of Gill's poetry can be found in October, a poem that illustrates his unsentimental use of nature in his work:

October

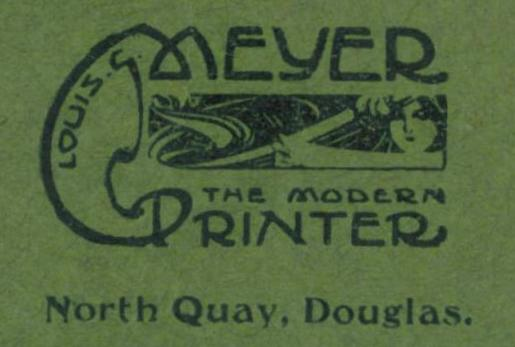
The logo of Louis G. Meyer, the publisher of the collection

The skies are dark and swollen with rain,
Their floor sags heavily round Barrule,
The sun's face fades to a silver stain,
Out of the West the wind comes cool
And full of the scent of rain at hand;
Rain-laden and gusty it sweeps the hills,
Already its onset shakes and spills
The first few drops of the brim-filled cup;
The fern is red, the rivers are up –
Winter beleaguers again our land.

The title poem of the collection, 'Juan-y-Pherick's Journey', is the story of a delusional homeless man who travels the Isle of Man begging and preaching. His name is the Manx version of 'John of Patrick'. P. W. Caine, in his review of the collection, said of this poem that it was "profoundly interesting, if not always convincing". A letter to Mannin by J. R. Moore of Ashburton, New Zealand, suggested that the poem might be based on two real-life characters, Chalse y Killey and Thom Delby.

== Quotes ==
- Our finite hearts thirst for the infinite sea. (Exile to Exile)
- Watchful lights of a distant coast / Opening and closing like the yellow eyes of lions. (Lights)
- Our women doze uneasily, / Their dreams made bitter by the sea. (Thoughts after Storm)
- Nights that besiege our dreams with death. (The Cottage)
- Shine back, O moon, day's lost delights, or weave / Their memories into dreams. (Vespers)
- The tendrils travel, but the root remains. (Home)
