= Ann Darr =

American writer

Lois "Ann" Russell Darr
- Born: March 13, 1920; Bagley, Iowa, U.S.
- Died: December 2, 2007 (aged 87)
- Burial place: Woodlawn Cemetery, Forest Park, Illinois
- Occupations: Journalist; broadcaster; pilot; homemaker; poet; writer
- Spouse: George Darr (divorced)
- Children: Dr. Elizabeth Darr, Deborah Darr and Shannon Darr

Ann Darr (March 13, 1920 – December 2, 2007) was an American poet and educator who lived in Washington, D.C.

== Biography ==
Born Lois Ann Russell in Bagley, Iowa she studied at the University of Iowa where she graduated in 1941 and also completed Civilian Pilot Training.

After college she began her career as a writer and broadcaster on the NBC Radio daily program The Women of Tomorrow.

When war broke out and her husband, enlisted in the Navy, she applied to the Women Airforce Service Pilots program and trained at Sweetwater, TX under pioneering aviator Jacqueline Cochran.

She wrote of her experience as a pilot in her 1978 book Cleared For Landing which The Washington Post'' praised for its "keen perception of the darker side of things."

Darr taught creative writing at American University and at the Writer's Center in Bethesda, Maryland.

She died of Alzheimer's disease and was buried as a veteran in 2007.

== Selected works ==
- St. Ann's Gut (Morrow and Company, 1971)
- The Myth of a Woman's Fist (Morrow and Company, 1973)
- Cleared for Landing (Dryad Press, 1978)
- Riding With the Fireworks (Alice James Books, 1981)
- Do You Take This Woman (Washington Writers Publishing House, 1986)
- The Twelve Pound Cigarette (SCOP, 1990)
- Confessions of a Skewed Romantic (The Bunny and Crocodile Press, 1993)
- Flying the Zuni Mountains (Forest Woods Media Productions, 1994)
- Gussie, Mad Hannah & Me (Argonne Press, 1999)
- Love in the Past Tense (Argonne, 2000)
