= Elizabeth Hodgson =

Botanist (1814–1877)

Elizabeth Hodgson (1814 – 26 December 1877) was a botanist and geologist whose research was focused on the Furness area of Lancashire (now present-day Cumbria). She published on fossils found in iron ore mines, and developed theories on glacial drift and limestone weathering.

== Life and career ==
Hodgson was born in 1814. Her father was James Hodgson, a captain of the Royal Navy.

She lived in Ulverston, Lancashire and studied the geology of the Lake District. She developed theories on glacial flow and drift and the weathering of limestone, which she began by examining the patterns of movement of fragments of granite from the fells. Her first paper about the area was published in 1863 in the Quarterly Journal of the Geological Society, and it was written about fossils found in iron ore mines near Ulverston. The paper was read to members by the president Andrew Crombie Ramsey. This paper was only the second paper by a woman published in the journal, the first being a letter about her earthquake experiences by Mrs Maria Graham, 38 years previously.

In the seven years after her first publication, Hodgson wrote other papers on the geology, paleontology and glaciology of the Lake District, most of which were published in the Geological Magazine. Hodgson also contributed papers to the Geologist, and was a member of the Botanical Exchange Club. She collected mosses from the Furness area, and published the Flora of Lake Lancashire in 1874 in the Journal of Botany.

After her health declined and she was unable to continue making scientific collections, Hodgson died on 26 December 1877, at 64 years old.

== Selected works ==
- "Flora of Lake Lancashire" in the Journal of Botany, British and Foreign (1874)
