= The Road Not Taken =

1915 poem by Robert Frost

- by Robert Frost
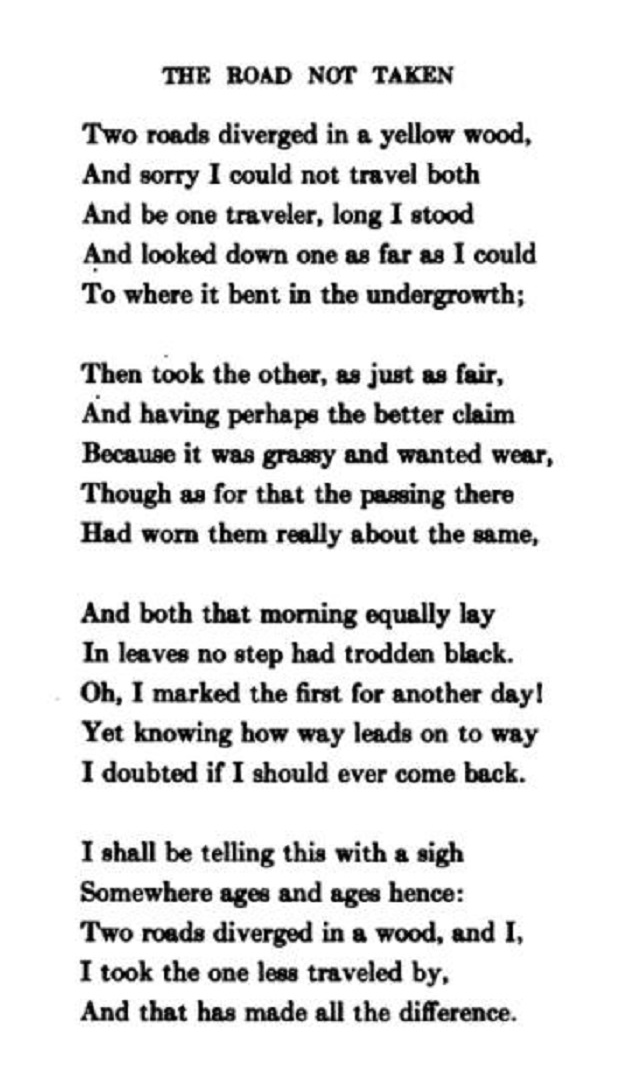
- First published in: The Atlantic Monthly
- Genre: Narrative poem
- Rhyme scheme: ABAAB
- Publication date: August 1915
- Lines: 20
- Metre: irregular iambic tetrameter

Full text
- The Road Not Taken at Wikisource

A reading of "The Road Not Taken"

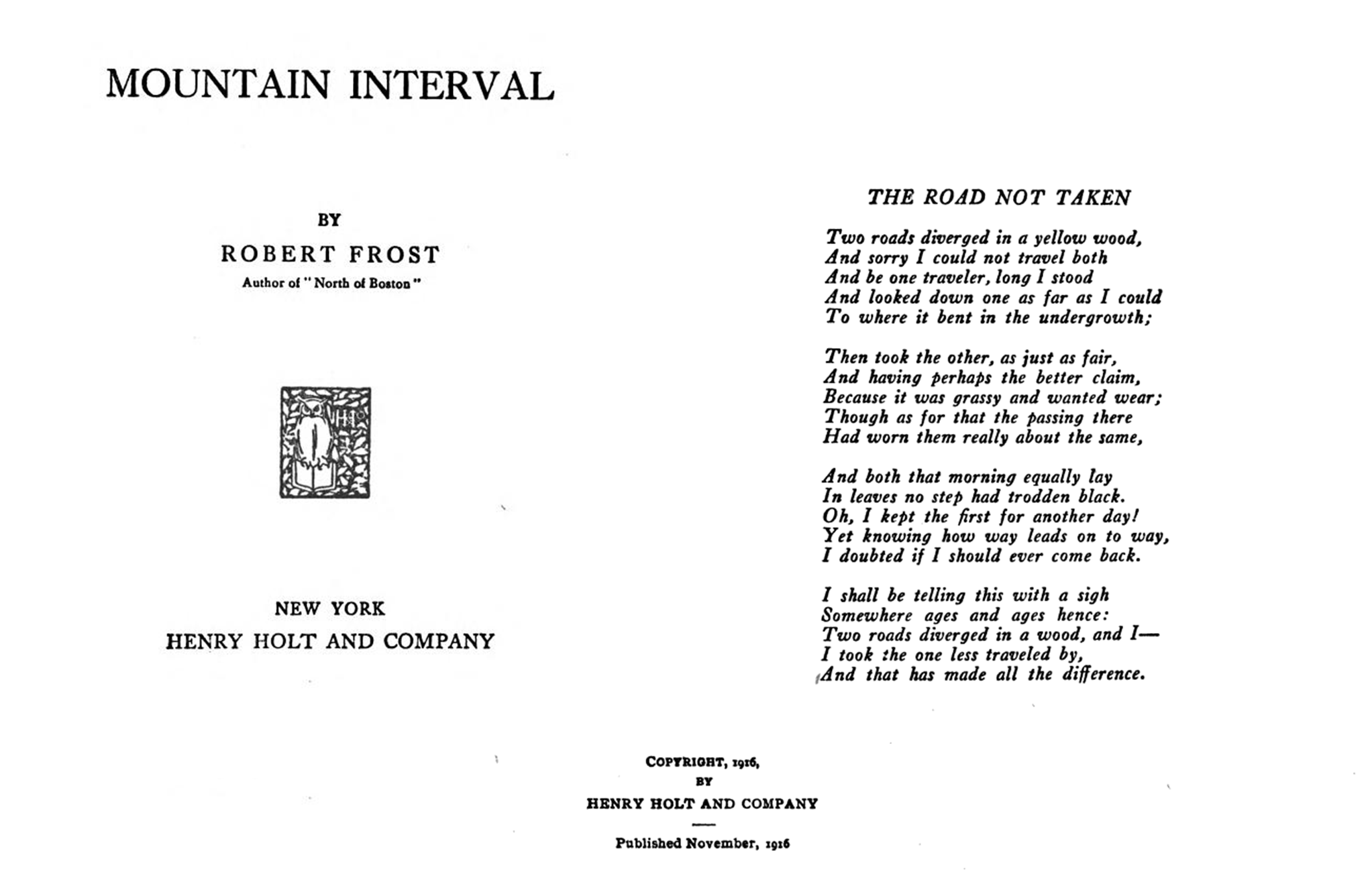
Cover of Mountain Interval, along with the page containing "The Road Not Taken"

The Road Not Taken is a narrative poem by Robert Frost, first published in the August 1915 issue of the Atlantic Monthly, and later published as the first poem in the 1916 poetry collection, Mountain Interval. Its central theme is the divergence of paths, both literal and figurative, although its interpretation is noted for being complex and potentially divergent.

== Background ==
Frost spent the years 1912 to 1915 in England, where among his acquaintances was the writer Edward Thomas. Thomas and Frost became close friends and took many walks together. Often as they would go on their walks, they would come across two paths and Thomas was indecisive about which road to take, and in retrospect often lamented that they should have taken the other one. After Frost returned to New Hampshire in 1915, he sent Thomas an advance copy of "The Road Not Taken". Thomas took the poem seriously and personally; literary scholar Matthew Hollis, who wrote an award-winning biography of Thomas, has posited that it was a significant contributor to his decision to enlist in World War I. Thomas was killed two years later in the Battle of Arras.In June 1957, Frost returned to Oatfields where Thomas once resided and he reminisced on the fact that at its core, this poem was a gentle joke aimed at his friend but in reality, the poem was so much more as it indicated to a time that had ‘made all the difference'.

== Reception ==
"The Road Not Taken" is one of Frost's most popular works. It is a frequently misunderstood poem, often read simply as a poem that champions the idea of "following your own path". It expresses some irony regarding such an idea. A 2015 critique in the Paris Review by David Orr described the misunderstanding this way:

The poem's speaker tells us he "shall be telling", at some point in the future, of how he took the road less traveled by, yet he has already admitted that the two paths "equally lay / In leaves" and "the passing there / Had worn them really about the same." So the road he will later call less traveled is actually the road equally traveled. The two roads are interchangeable.

Orr concluded by noting: "It is a poem about the necessity of choosing that somehow, like its author, never makes a choice itself—that instead repeatedly returns us to the same enigmatic, leaf-shadowed crossroads."

Frost wrote the poem as a joke for his friend Edward Thomas, who was often indecisive about which route to take when the two went walking. A New York Times book review on Brian Hall's 2008 biography Fall of Frost states: "Whichever way they go, they're sure to miss something good on the other path." Regarding the "sigh" that is mentioned in the last stanza, it may be seen as an expression of regret or of satisfaction. However, there is significance in the difference between what the speaker has just said of the two roads, and what he will say in the future. According to Lawrance Thompson, Frost's biographer, as Frost was once about to read the poem, he commented to his audience, "You have to be careful of that one; it's a tricky poem—very tricky", perhaps intending to suggest the poem's ironic possibilities.

Thompson suggests that the poem's narrator is "one who habitually wastes energy in regretting any choice made: belatedly but wistfully he sighs over the attractive alternative rejected." Thompson also says that when introducing the poem in readings, Frost would say that the speaker was based on his friend Thomas. In Frost's words, Thomas was "a person who, whichever road he went, would be sorry he didn't go the other. He was hard on himself that way."

== Enduring fame ==
[The Road Not Taken] plays a unique role not simply in American literature, but in American culture — and in world culture as well. Its signature phrases have become so ubiquitous, so much a part of everything from coffee mugs to refrigerator magnets to graduation speeches...

— David Orr, The Road Not Taken: Finding America in the Poem Everyone Loves and Almost Everyone Gets Wrong

The poem remains very well known well into the 21st century. A century after its publication, David Orr on 18th August 2015 published a book about the 20–line poem, The Road Not Taken: Finding America in the Poem Everyone Loves and Almost Everyone Gets Wrong, an examination of the poem's interpretation and its cultural influence.

The poem's lines have been quoted in songs by Bruce Hornsby, Melissa Etheridge, George Strait, Talib Kweli, and many others. It has been the title of twelve television series episodes. Its lines have been used in about two thousand news stories (1980–2016 alone), and the phrase "The Road Not Taken" appears as a title, subtitle, or chapter heading in more than 400 books on subjects ranging from political theory to a theoretical zombie apocalypse. A film named after the poem, "The Roads Not Taken" was released in 2020 starring Javier Bardem and Salma Hayek. The poem has been referenced multiple times in mainstream media by Apple in their 1998 iMac advert to promote the simpler, more colorful computers, and also by Ford in New Zealand, showing the effect even outside the United States.
