= Jane Griffiths (poet) =

British poet and literary historian (born 1970)

Jane Griffiths (born 1970) is a British poet and literary historian.

== Career and writings ==
Griffiths was born in Exeter, England, and brought up in the Netherlands. She studied English at Oxford University, where she won the Newdigate prize for her poem "The House". After working as a bookbinder in London and Norfolk, she returned to Oxford to gain a doctorate with a dissertation on the Tudor poet John Skelton, and became an editor on the Oxford English Dictionary. Her poetry gained her an Eric Gregory Award in 1996.

Griffiths taught at Oxford University's St. Edmund Hall, before becoming a lecturer in English literature at the University of Edinburgh. She was appointed a lecturer in the Department of English at the University of Bristol in 2007. In 2012, she left her position as senior lecturer in English literature at the University of Bristol to become a CUF Lecturer in medieval and early modern English literature at the University of Oxford and a tutorial fellow of Wadham College. According to her university page, Griffiths works primarily on the poetry and drama of the fifteenth and early sixteenth centuries. Her first monograph on John Skelton was published by Oxford University Press (OUP) in 2005, and her second, on late-medieval and early modern glossing practices, in 2014.

Her collection Another Country was short-listed for the 2008 Forward Poetry Prize. Griffiths' fourth collection of poetry Terrestrial Variations was published by Bloodaxe Books in 2012. It was described by Adam Thorpe (The Guardian) as "sensuously wrought and even, at times, subtly erotic, her poems simultaneously evoke another level of pure abstraction, with words in place of coils of paint". In 2017 Griffiths’ fifth collection of poems Silent In Finisterre was published. It was described by Sarah Broom in The Times Literary Supplement as "a major achievement, outstanding, complex and subtle in thought, supple of tone and piercing in its observation".

Her collection Little Silver was published by Bloodaxe Books in 2022.

British poet Jane Griffiths’ sixth collection, Little Silver, offers the riches you might expect from a former bookbinder and Oxford English Dictionary lexicographer turned painter, silversmith, and John Skelton scholar. Clear-eyed lyrics move through shifting perspectives, holding us in moments of narrative tension that evolve into lyric reflection

— Rebecca Morgan Frank, Poetry Foundation USA

== Poetry volumes ==
- The House (Hitchin: Mandeville Press, 1990). ISBN 1-870410-12-2
- A Grip on Thin Air (Tarset, Northumberland: Bloodaxe Books, 2000). ISBN 1-85224-539-5
- Icarus on Earth (Tarset, Northumberland: Bloodaxe Books, 2005). ISBN 1-85224-695-2
- Another Country: New and Selected Poems (Tarset, Northumberland: Bloodaxe Books, 2008). ISBN 9781852247942.
- Terrestrial Variations (Tarset, Northumberland: Bloodaxe Books, 2012) ISBN 9781852249274.
- Silent In Finisterre (Tarset, Northumberland: Bloodaxe Books, 2017) ISBN 9781780373560.
- Little Silver (Tarset, Northumberland: Bloodaxe Books, 2022) ISBN 9781780376127.
