= Robert Frost Farm =

Robert Frost Farm may refer to:

- Robert Frost Farm (Derry, New Hampshire), a U.S. National Historic Landmark listed on the National Register of Historic Places in New Hampshire
- Robert Frost Farm (Ripton, Vermont), a U.S. National Historic Landmark listed on the National Register of Historic Places in Addison County, Vermont
- Robert Frost Farm (South Shaftsbury, Vermont), listed on the National Register of Historic Places in Bennington County, Vermont

== See also ==
- Frost Farm (disambiguation)
