= Frost Farm =

Frost Farm may refer to:

- Robert Frost Farm (Derry, New Hampshire), a National Historic Landmark
- Frost Farm (Korpi Rd., Dublin, New Hampshire), listed on the National Register of Historic Places in Cheshire County, New Hampshire
- Frost Farm (Old Marlborough Rd., Dublin, New Hampshire), listed on the NRHP in Cheshire County, New Hampshire
- Robert Frost Farm (Ripton, Vermont), NRHP-listed
- Robert Frost Farm (South Shaftsbury, Vermont), listed on the National Register of Historic Places in Bennington County, Vermont
