= Robert Frost Stone House Museum =

Historic house and museum in South Shaftsbury, Vermont

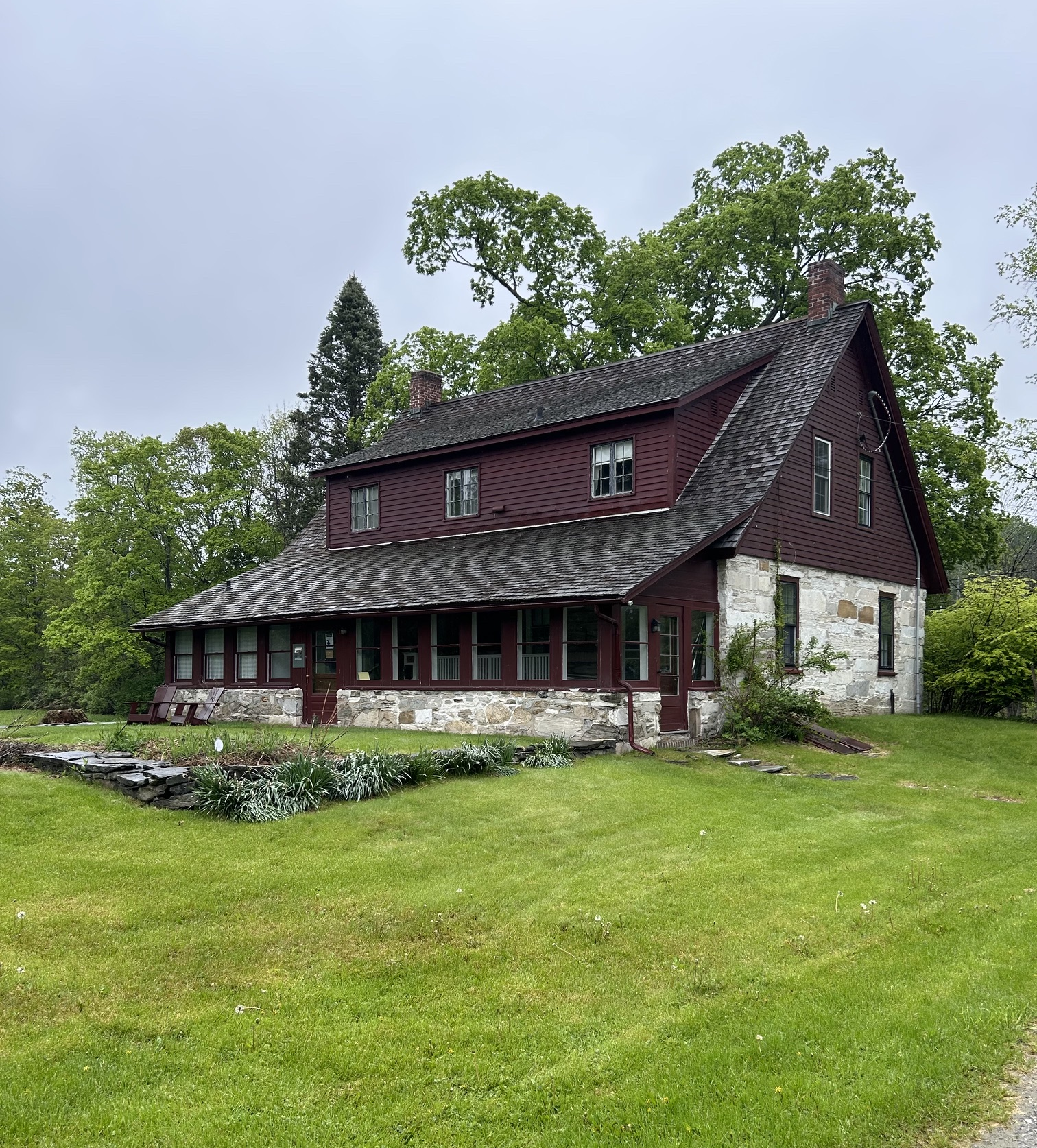
The Robert Frost Stone House, 2026

The Robert Frost Stone House Museum is a historic house museum in South Shaftsbury, Vermont. Built in 1769, the Dutch Colonial farmhouse was the home of American poet Robert Frost (1874–1963) from 1920 to 1929. During his years at the property, Frost wrote poems later published in his Pulitzer Prize-winning collection, New Hampshire (1923), including Stopping by Woods on a Snowy Evening.

Frost purchased the property in 1920. He later transferred ownership to his son Carole Frost and daughter-in-law Lillian LaBatt, and the property remained in the Frost family until the 1960s. In 2002, the house was acquired and restored by the Friends of Robert Frost, which opened it to the public as a museum. Ownership was transferred to Bennington College in 2017.

== History ==
Frost acquired the Peleg Cole farm, also known as the Half Stone House, for his family in 1920 with the goal of becoming an apple farmer. During Frost's residency, the property included 80 acres and a large apple orchard. In a letter written shortly after purchasing the farm, Frost described moving to a “stone cottage on a hill” in South Shaftsbury and expressed plans to create a “new Garden of Eden with a thousand apple trees of some unforbidden variety.”

While living at the stone house, Frost wrote poems later published in his collection, New Hampshire (1923), including Stopping by Woods on a Snowy Evening. In December 1923, he gifted the property to his son Carole and daughter-in-law Lillian LaBatt. Frost subsequently purchased a second farm in the area, called the The Gully, and later moved there with his wife, Elinor. He was living at the stone house when he received his first Pulitzer Prize in 1924. The Frost family retained ownership of the property until the 1960s.

== Property and museum ==
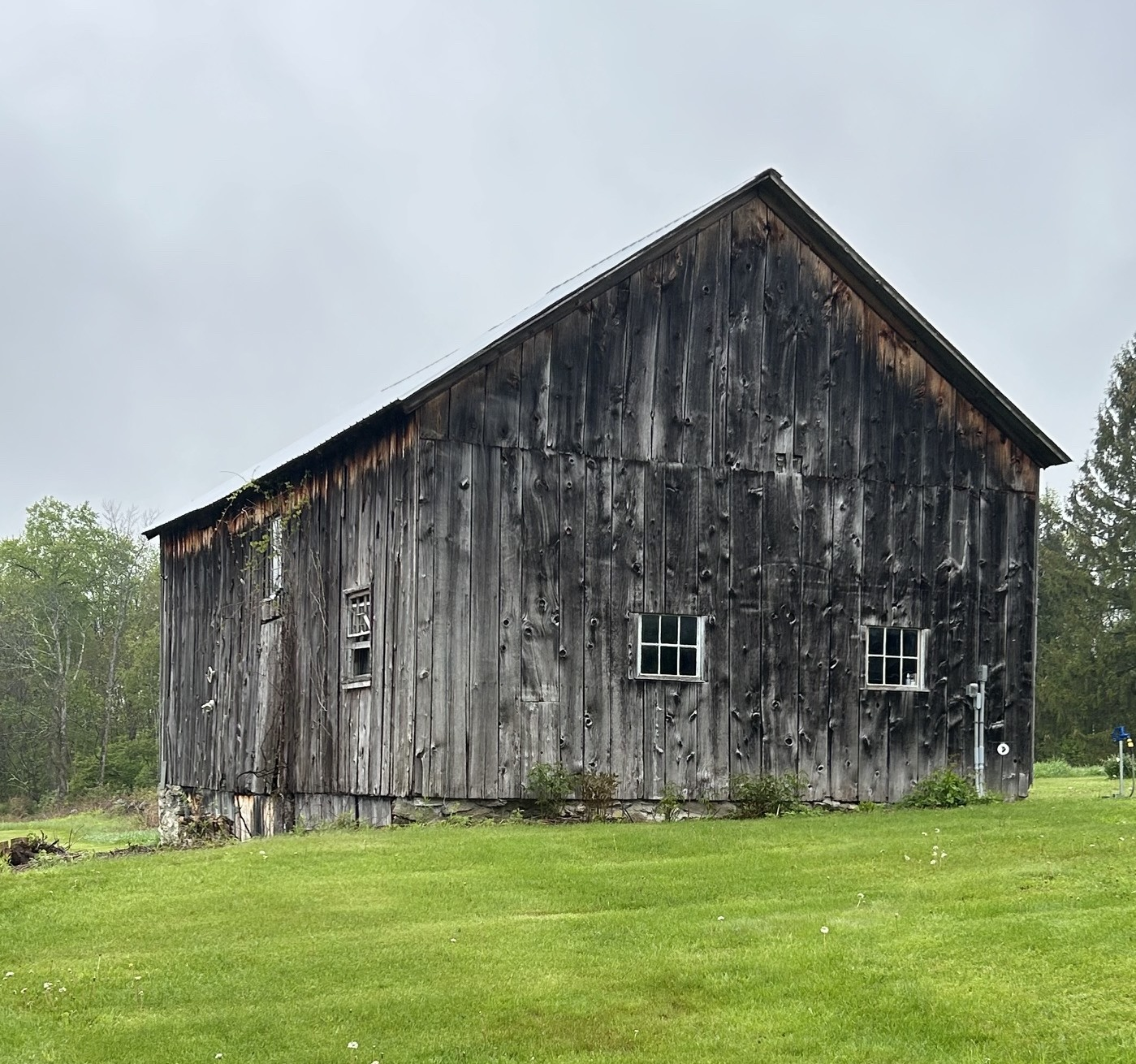
Barn, Robert Frost Stone House, 2026

The museum is located at 121 Historic Route 7A, Shaftsbury, Vermont. The Dutch Colonial style house was built in 1769 and was constructed with local stone and timber. The historic site now consists of seven acres, tumbled stone walls, two barns, and a few surviving apple trees. The house was in disrepair when acquired by the Friends of Robert Frost in 2002. The organization restored the house and grounds, opened the property to the public and managed the site for 15 years. In 2017, ownership was transferred to Bennington College.

The property includes a large 19th-century timber-frame barn and a smaller meeting barn. In the 2010s and 2020s, the barns underwent restoration and infrastructure improvements, including the installation of electricity, water service, lighting, and internet access. Earlier preservation work included replacement of the historic barn's roof through a Vermont Historic Preservation Barn Grant. The restored barns are used for educational and public programming related to agriculture, historic preservation, and Robert Frost's connection to rural life.

The property historically included a large apple orchard, reflecting Frost's long-standing interest in fruit growing that dated back to his years at the Derry farm in New Hampshire. A young orchard has since been planted on the site using trees grafted from one of the last surviving apple trees associated with Frost's orchard.

== See also ==
- The Frost Place, Franconia, New Hampshire
- Robert Frost Farm (Derry, New Hampshire)
- Robert Frost Farm (Ripton, Vermont)
- List of residences of American writers
