= Stephen L. Adler =

American physicist (born 1939)

- Born: 30 November 1939 (age 86); New York City, U.S.
- Education: Harvard University (BA); Princeton University (PhD)
- Known for: Adler–Bell–Jackiw anomaly Adler–Weisberger formula Adler–Bardeen theorem
- Awards: J. J. Sakurai Prize (1988); Dirac Medal (1998)
- Scientific career
- Fields: Physics
- Workplaces: Institute for Advanced Study

Stephen Louis Adler (born November 30, 1939) is an American physicist specializing in elementary particles and field theory. He is currently professor emeritus in the school of natural sciences at the Institute for Advanced Study in Princeton, New Jersey.

== Biography ==
Adler was born in New York City. He received an A.B. degree at Harvard University in 1961, where he was a Putnam Fellow in 1959, and a Ph.D. from Princeton University in 1964. Adler completed his doctoral dissertation, titled High energy neutrino reactions and conservations hypotheses, under the supervision of Sam Treiman. He is the son of Ruth and Irving Adler, and older brother of Peggy Adler.

Adler became a member of the Institute for Advanced Study in 1966, becoming a full professor of theoretical physics in 1969, and was named "New Jersey Albert Einstein Professor" at the institute in 1979. He was elected a member of the American Academy of Arts and Sciences in 1974, and a member of the National Academy of Sciences in 1975.

He has won the J. J. Sakurai Prize from the American Physical Society in 1988, and the Dirac Medal of the International Centre for Theoretical Physics in 1998, among other awards.

Adler's seminal papers on high energy neutrino processes, current algebra, soft pion theorems, sum rules, and perturbation theory anomalies helped lay the foundations for the current Standard Model of elementary particle physics.

In 2012, Adler contributed to a family venture when he wrote the foreword for his then 99-year-old father's 87th book, Solving the Riddle of Phyllotaxis: Why the Fibonacci Numbers and the Golden Ratio Occur on Plants. The book's diagrams are by his sister Peggy.

== Trace dynamics ==
In his book Quantum Theory as an Emergent Phenomenon, published 2004, Adler presented his trace dynamics, a framework in which quantum field theory emerges from a matrix theory. In this matrix theory, particles are represented by non-commuting matrices, and the matrix elements of bosonic and fermionic particles are ordinary complex numbers and non-commuting Grassmann numbers, respectively. Using the action principle, a Lagrangian can be constructed from the trace of a polynomial function of these matrices, leading to Hamiltonian equations of motion. The construction of a statistical mechanics of these matrix models leads, so Adler says, to an "emergent effective complex quantum field theory".

Adler's trace dynamics has been discussed in relation to the differential space theory of quantum systems by Norbert Wiener and Amand Siegel, to its variant by David Bohm and Jeffrey Bub, and to modifications of the Schrödinger equation by additional terms such as the quantum potential term or stochastic terms, and to hidden variable theories.

== See also ==
- PVLAS

== Works ==
- Quantum Theory as an Emergent Phenomenon: The Statistical Mechanics of Matrix Models as the Precursor of Quantum Field Theory, Cambridge University Press, 2004, ISBN 978-0-521-11597-1, 978-0-521-83194-9
- Adventures in Theoretical Physics: Selected Papers of Stephen Adler with Commentaries: Selected Papers with Commentaries, World Scientific Series in 20th Century Physics, World Scientific Publishing Co., 2006, ISBN 978-9-812-56370-5; text at archive.org
- The Guide to PAMIR, Theory and Use of Parameterized Adaptive Multidimensional Integration Routines, World Scientific Publishing Co., 2012, ISBN 978-981-4425-03-2
- Quaternionic Quantum Mechanics and Quantum Fields, International Series of Monographs on Physics, Oxford University Press, 1994, ISBN 978-0-195-06643-2
