= Peggy Adler =

American writer (born 1942)

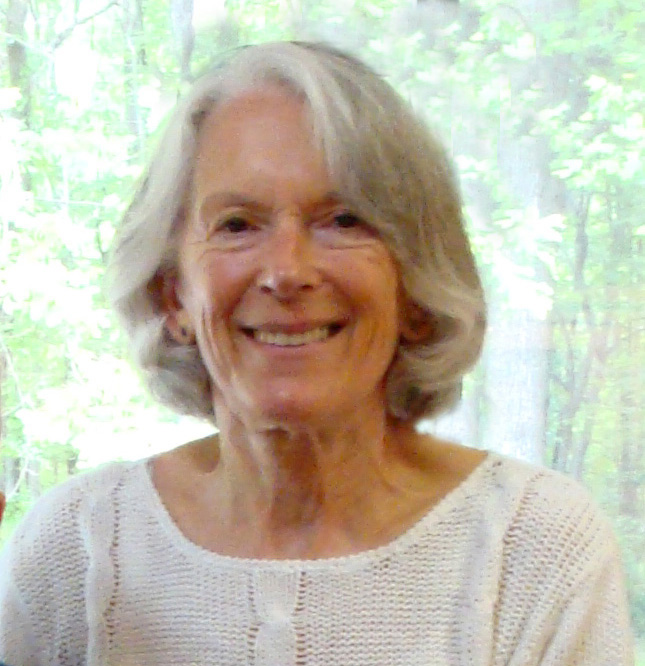
- Born: Margaret Ann Adler; February 10, 1942 (age 84); New York City, New York
- Occupations: Author & illustrator; investigative researcher
- Spouses: Jeremy Abbott Walsh (m. 1962–1968) Richard Robohm (m. 1976–1993)
- Partner: Harry Swaun (May 27, 2006–Died June 1, 2019)
- Relatives: Irving Adler (father); Stephen L. Adler (brother); Tenney Whedon Walsh (daughter); Avery Denison Walsh (daughter) married to Adam I. Lapidus; Nathan Adler (psychologist) (uncle);

Margaret Ann Adler (born February 10, 1942) is an American author & illustrator and investigative researcher. She is the daughter of Irving Adler and Ruth Adler and younger sister of Stephen L. Adler.

== Early career ==
Adler began her professional career as an illustrator in 1958, at the age of 16, when she was co-illustrator of her father's book Weather In Your Life. That same year, she was the sole illustrator of Hot and Cold. She later illustrated the children's book Numbers Old and New, as well as authoring and illustrating The Adler Book of Puzzles and Riddles; and The Second Adler Book of Puzzles and Riddles. Adler married in June 1962 and had two daughters before filing for divorce in early fall 1967.

== Authorship ==
Adler continued working as an illustrator, with work published by the John Day Company, Little, Brown & Company, the Journal of Theoretical Biology, the Journal of Algebra, the National Council of Teachers of Mathematics, World Scientific Publishing the Bronx Zoo, and the Humane Society of the United States. In the mid-1970s Adler returned to writing as well as illustrating, when Franklin Watts published her book, Metric Puzzles, followed shortly thereafter by Math Puzzles and Geography Puzzles. In 1976 Adler remarried and for a brief time, in the early 1990s, worked under the name of Peggy Adler Robohm, but after a few years resumed the use of her maiden name. Following a hiatus of forty years, Adler authored yet another book, this one titled Images of America CLINTON (Arcadia Publishing), which traces the history of Clinton, Connecticut from 1663 to the present. That book was followed in 2022 by Pallenberg Wonder Bears - From the Beginning and in 2023 by Trilogy - Three True Stories of Scoundrels and Schemers, both published by BearManor Media.

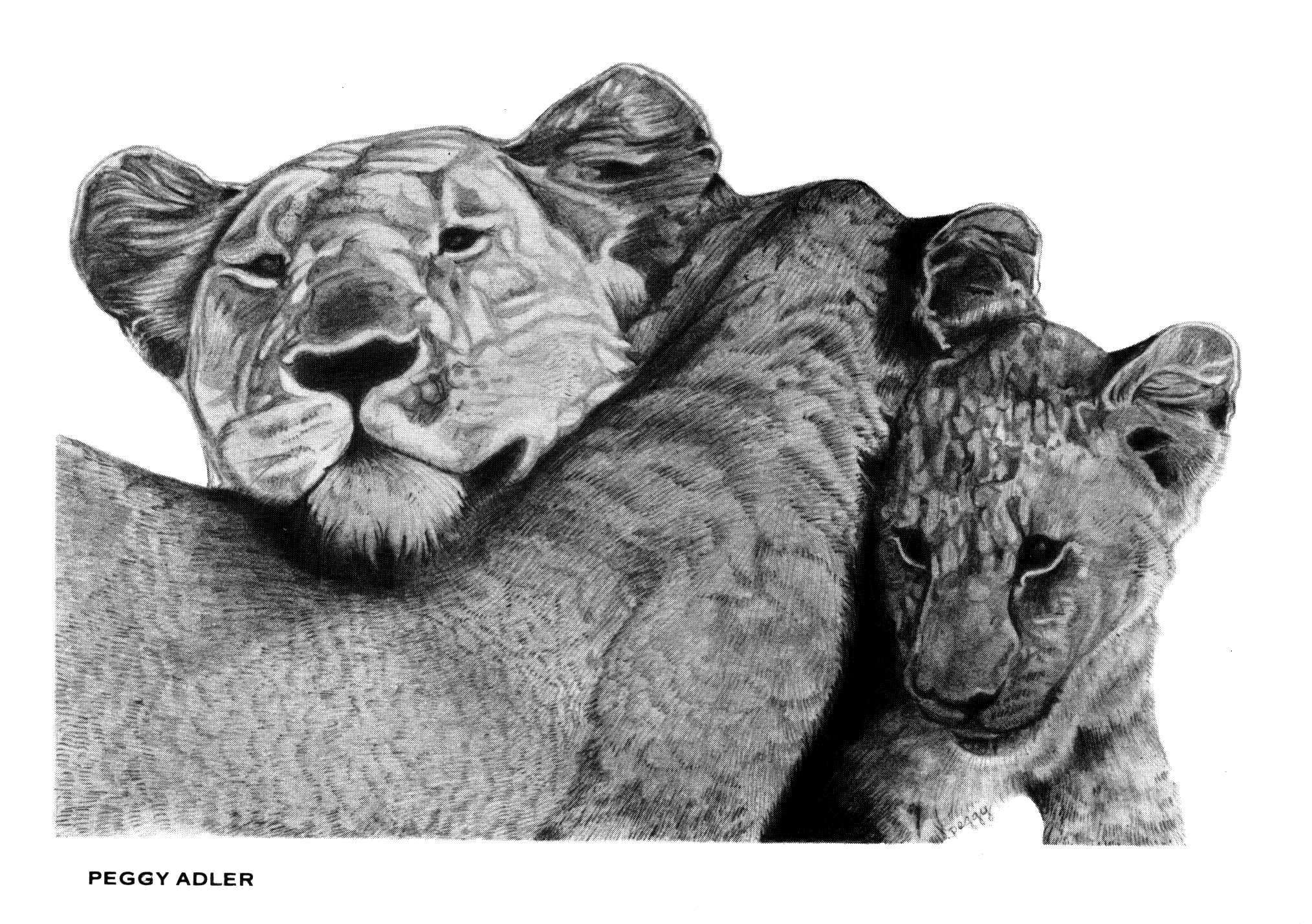
"Lioness & Her Cubs", "Geography Puzzles", written & illustrated by Peggy Adler.

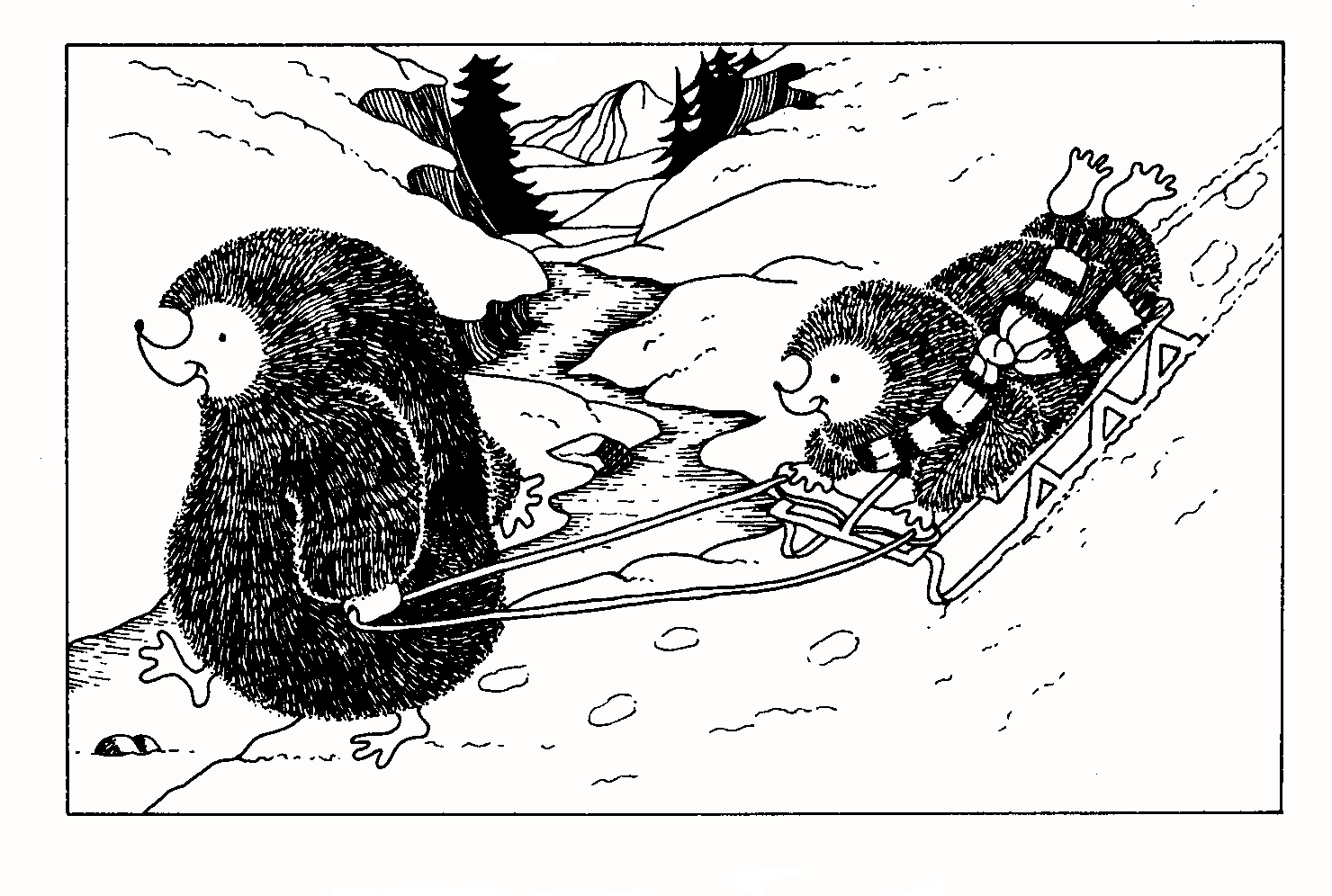
"Hedgehogs Sledding", "Metric Puzzles", written & illustrated by Peggy Adler

Book Cover, "Sets and Numbers for the Very Young" Illustrations and Book Cover by Peggy Adler, 1969

== Investigation ==
In 1991, she was retained by self-proclaimed CIA agent, arms dealer and money launderer, Richard Brenneke, to co-author his autobiography. Discovering evidence in his files contradicting claims regarding his presence at October Surprise conspiracy meetings, she contacted former CIA analyst-turned-journalist, Frank Snepp. This evidence was the basis of Snepp's February 1992 article for the Village Voice which outed Brenneke as a con artist. Adler worked with Snepp on additional articles for the "Voice" which went on to prove that the so-called "October Surprise" was a hoax. Adler's work was also the subject of a chapter in Robert Parry's book, "Trick or Treason: The October Surprise Mystery" and she was interviewed by PBS' Frontline in this regard for an episode which aired in April 1992. In mid-1992, learning that the House October Surprise Task Force was investigating whether or not there actually had been an October Surprise, she contacted investigative journalist and author Steven Emerson, who put her in touch with the Task Force so that she could turn over to them the seventy cartons of documents she had hauled east from Brenneke's home in Portland, Oregon, in order to write his memoirs. Subsequently, she worked as a consultant to the Task Force. Adler's Brenneke experience is the first chapter in the aforementioned Trilogy - Three True Stories of Scoundrels and Schemers and its audiobook, narrated by Peter Coyote, won a gold medal in the 2024 Independent Publisher Book Awards (aka IPPY) Competition [Category #91].

In 2000 and 2001, she was the researcher for journalist and author Ron Rosenbaum's articles about Yale's fabled Skull and Bones, which were published in The New York Observer.

== Community involvement ==
Adler is active in local affairs in Clinton, Connecticut, the town in which she lives. In 2005 she filed a complaint with Clinton's Board of Ethics, stating that a first term selectman had violated his fiduciary duties as an elected official by voting in favor of the town's purchase of properties in his neighborhood for open space, when he had previously been a "member of a neighborhood group that vigorously opposed" a nearby development proposal. The Board of Ethics dismissed the complaint, despite the fact that Adler was "never interviewed" and no witnesses were called. Adler later "said the Board of Ethics based its finding on a 'misinterpretation' of both the state law and the town's charter and subsequently, Town Counsel said that they had the final say over such matters and their decision would stand. Adler later sought, unsuccessfully, to have the Board's decision reviewed by Richard Blumenthal, who was Connecticut's Attorney General at the time. The Board of Selectmen responded to these outcomes by creating "a committee to review the town's code of ethics." As a result, a new ethics ordinance was enacted by the Town of Clinton in November 2006, which became effective in January 2007. This new ordinance was successfully implemented for the first time in early 2012. Adler served as a Police Commissioner in Clinton for eight years, having first been elected to that position in 2005. There, she has also served on the Design Review Board, Historic District Commission, and Charter Revision Commission.

== Intelligence work ==
In July 2000, the New England Chapter of the Association of Former Intelligence Officers held a meeting in Northampton, Massachusetts. Adler served as the program coordinator and kept careful track of the "comings and goings at the banquet room to prevent any 'crashers' to the luncheon". Describing the purpose of the association, Adler was quoted as saying, "A big part of what we try to do is to dispel the misconception that intelligence work is just like what they show in James Bond movies." The meeting was attended by approximately 20 of the protestors, about whom Adler said, "It's their constitutional right, so long as they pay to attend and dine at the luncheon for the same fee as the membership." In 2001, Adler was awarded the General Richard G. Stilwell Chairman's Award by the Association of Former Intelligence Officers.

== Honoree ==
In August 2017 Adler received the Albert Nelson Marquis Lifetime Achievement Award for "career longevity and unwavering excellence in (her) chosen field(s)".
