= Robert Frost House =

Historic house in Massachusetts, United States

- U.S. National Register of Historic Places
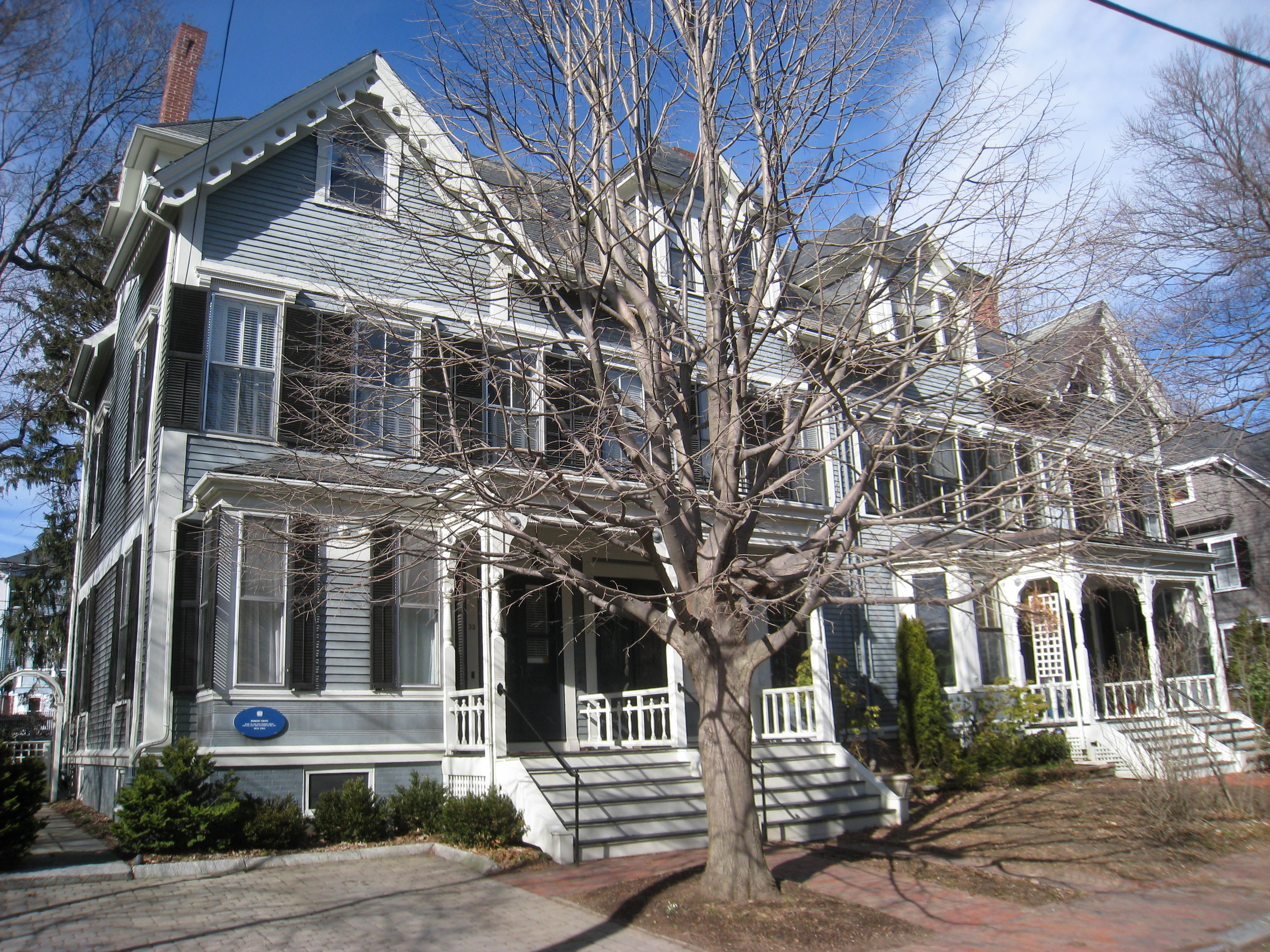

- Location within Massachusetts Location within the United States
- Interactive map showing the location of the Frost House
- Location: 29–35 Brewster Street, Cambridge, Massachusetts
- Coordinates: 42°22′43.4″N 71°07′56.0″W
- Built: 1884
- Architectural style: Queen Anne, Shingle Style
- MPS: Cambridge MRA
- NRHP reference No.: 82001941
- Added to NRHP: April 13, 1982

The Robert Frost House is an historic house in Cambridge, Massachusetts. It consists of four wood-frame townhouses, 2 1/2 stories in height, arranged in mirror image styling. Each pair of units has a porch providing access to those units, supported by turned posts and with a low Stick style balustrade. The Queen Anne/Stick style frame house was built in 1884, and has gables decorated with a modest amount of Gothic-style bargeboard. The house was home to poet Robert Frost for the last two decades of his life.

The house was listed on the National Register of Historic Places in 1982. It remains a private home.

== See also ==
- National Register of Historic Places listings in Cambridge, Massachusetts
- The Frost Place in Franconia, NH
- Robert Frost Farm (Derry, New Hampshire)
- Robert Frost Farm (Ripton, Vermont)
