= List of National Historic Landmarks in Vermont =

This is a list of National Historic Landmarks in Vermont. There are 18 National Historic Landmarks in Vermont.

This is intended to be a complete list of properties and districts that are, National Historic Landmarks in Vermont. The locations of National Register properties and districts (at least for all showing latitude and longitude coordinates below) may be seen in an online map by clicking on "Map of all coordinates".

== Key ==
	National Historic Landmark
^{†}	National Historic Landmark District
^{#}	National Historic Site, National Historical Park, National Memorial, or National Monument
^{*}	Delisted Landmark

== List ==
	Landmark name	Image	Date designated	Location	County	Description
1	Brown Bridge	Brown Bridge	August 25, 2014 (#74000250)	Shrewsbury; 43°33′58″N 72°55′10″W	Rutland	1880 covered bridge is outstanding example of Town lattice truss; may have been last bridge built by longtime bridgewright Nichols Powers.
2^{†}	Calvin Coolidge Homestead District	Calvin Coolidge Homestead District	June 23, 1965 (#66000794)	Plymouth Notch; 43°32′08″N 72°43′18″W	Windsor	Birthplace and family home of President Calvin Coolidge.
3	Robert Frost Farm	Robert Frost Farm	May 23, 1968 (#68000046)	Ripton; 43°57′59″N 73°00′17″W	Addison	Homestead of author Robert Frost, now owned by Middlebury College.
4	George Perkins Marsh Boyhood Home	George Perkins Marsh Boyhood Home	June 11, 1967 (#67000023)	Woodstock; 43°37′39″N 72°31′06″W	Windsor	Boyhood home of George Perkins Marsh, an American diplomat and philologist, an early environmentalist. Now in the Marsh-Billings-Rockefeller National Historical Park.
5	Justin S. Morrill Homestead	Justin S. Morrill Homestead	September 22, 1960 (#66000795)	Strafford; 43°51′40″N 72°22′33″W	Orange	Gothic Revival home of Justin Smith Morrill, Vermont representative and senator known for the 1862 and 1890 Morrill Land-Grant Colleges Acts.
6	Mount Independence	Mount Independence	November 28, 1972 (#71000079)	Orwell; 43°49′35″N 73°22′49″W	Addison	Site of Fort Independence, an American Revolutionary War fortification built opposite Fort Ticonderoga.
7	Naulakha (Rudyard Kipling House)	Naulakha (Rudyard Kipling House)	November 4, 1993 (#79000231)	Dummerston; 42°53′55″N 72°33′51″W	Windham	Home where Rudyard Kipling wrote The Jungle Book.
8	Robbins and Lawrence Armory and Machine Shop	Robbins and Lawrence Armory and Machine Shop	November 13, 1966 (#66000796)	Windsor; 43°28′22″N 72°23′23″W	Windsor	Erected in 1846, this site is an excellent example of 19th-century American industrial architecture.
9	Rockingham Meeting House	Rockingham Meeting House	May 16, 2000 (#79000232)	Rockingham; 43°11′16″N 72°29′13″W	Windham	A rare 18th-century New England meetinghouse of the "second period" type.
10	Rokeby	Rokeby	December 9, 1997 (#74000201)	Ferrisburg; 44°13′14″N 73°14′17″W	Addison	This Robinson family farmstead is significant for its role in the Underground Railroad.
11	Round Church	Round Church	June 19, 1996 (#74000355)	Richmond; 44°23′56″N 72°59′58″W	Chittenden	The Round Church, built in 1812–1813, is a rare, well-preserved example of a sixteen-sided meetinghouse.
12^{†}	Shelburne Farms	Shelburne Farms	January 3, 2001 (#80000330)	Shelburne; 44°23′32″N 73°15′26″W	Chittenden	Created in 1886 by Dr. William Seward Webb and Eliza Vanderbilt Webb as a model agricultural estate.
13	St. Johnsbury Athenaeum	St. Johnsbury Athenaeum	June 19, 1996 (#96000970)	St. Johnsbury; 44°24′39″N 72°01′08″W	Caledonia	Significant due to its architecture, its American paintings and books from its original role as a public library and free art gallery, and its funding by Horace Fairbanks, manufacturer of the world's first platform scale.
14	Socialist Labor Party Hall	Socialist Labor Party Hall	May 16, 2000 (#98001267)	Barre; 44°11′54″N 72°30′27″W	Washington	A place where socialist, anarchist, and labor anarchist politics were debated.
15	Stellafane Observatory	Stellafane Observatory	December 20, 1989 (#77000107)	North Springfield; 43°16′34″N 72°31′09″W	Windsor	Contains original clubhouse of the Springfield Telescope Makers, Inc. (1924), and the first large optical telescope (1930) built and owned by that kind of amateur society.
16	Ticonderoga (Side-paddle-wheel Lakeboat)	Ticonderoga (Side-paddle-wheel Lakeboat)	January 28, 1964 (#66000797)	Shelburne; 44°22′30″N 73°13′53″W	Chittenden	220-foot (67 m) steamboat built in Shelburne in 1906.
17	Vermont Statehouse	Vermont Statehouse	December 30, 1970 (#70000739)	Montpelier; 44°15′37″N 72°34′51″W	Washington	The capitol and seat of the state's legislative branch of government.
18	Emma Willard House	Emma Willard House	December 21, 1965 (#66000798)	Middlebury; 44°00′20″N 73°10′29″W	Addison	Home of Emma Willard, an influential pioneer in the development of women's education in the United States.

== Former landmark ==
Landmark name	Image	Year listed	Locality	County	Description
Robert Frost Farm, "The Gully"		Designated 1968, withdrawn 1986	South Shaftsbury	Bennington	This property was the residence of poet Robert Frost between 1929 and 1938. Many of the poems from his Pulitzer Prize-winning Collected Poems (1930) and A Further Range (1937) were written here. The property remained in the Frost family until 1963. Extensive renovations to the buildings after 1979 led the Park Service to withdraw the landmark designation.

== See also ==
- National Register of Historic Places listings in Vermont
- List of National Historic Landmarks by state
- List of National Natural Landmarks in Vermont
