= George L. Buck =

American teacher, businessman, and politician

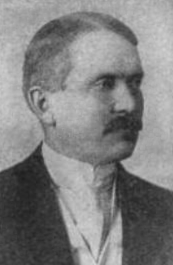

Member of the Wisconsin State Senate
- In office 1919–1923

Personal details
- Born: July 20, 1866 Shaftsbury, Vermont, US
- Died: December 6, 1939 (aged 73) Racine, Wisconsin, US
- Party: Republican
- Education: Fort Edward Collegiate Institute
- Occupation: Teacher, businessman, politician

George L. Buck (July 20, 1866 – December 6, 1939) was an American teacher, businessman, and politician.

== Biography ==
Born in Shaftsbury, Vermont, Buck went to North Bennington High School and then graduated from Fort Edward Collegiate Institute. He then taught for several years in Vermont. In 1889, he moved to Racine County, Wisconsin and continued to teach. Buck was appointed railway mail clerk and then post office inspector. In 1902, Buck helped organized the Racine Iron & Wire Works and was also involved in the banking business. From 1919 to 1923, Buck served in the Wisconsin State Senate and was a Republican. Buck died of a heart attack at his home in Racine, Wisconsin.
