= Irving Adler =

American political activist

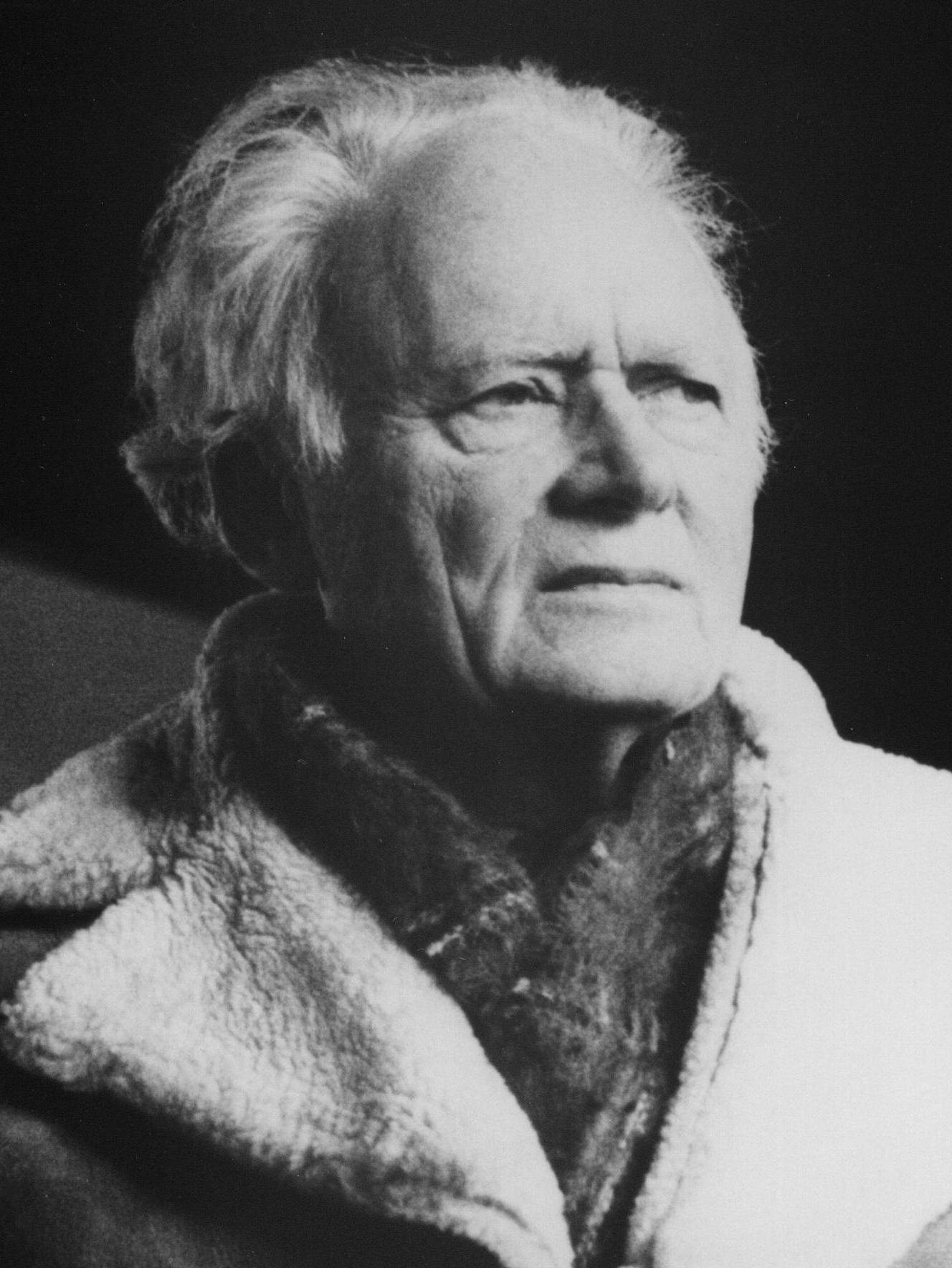
- Adler in 1988
- Born: 13 April 1913; Harlem, New York
- Died: 22 September 2012 (aged 99); Bennington, Vermont
- Occupations: mathematician, writer
- Known for: Composition ring
- Relatives: Stephen L. Adler (son), Peggy Adler (daughter), Nathan Adler (psychologist) (brother)

Irving Adler (April 27, 1913 – September 22, 2012) was an American author, mathematician, scientist, political activist, and educator. He was the author of 57 books (some under the pen name Robert Irving) about mathematics, science, and education, and the co-author of 30 more, for both children and adults. His books have been published in 31 countries in 19 different languages. Since his teenaged years, Adler was involved in social and political activities focused on civil rights, civil liberties, and peace, including his role as a plaintiff in the McCarthy-era case Adler vs. Board of Education that bears his name.

== Life ==
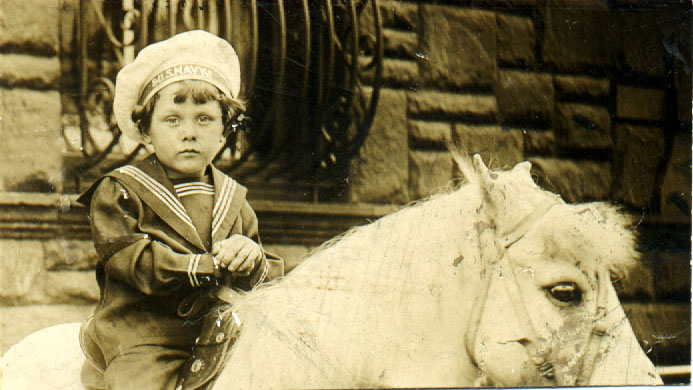
Irving Adler in 1917

Irving Adler was born in Harlem, in New York City, the third of five children. His Jewish parents emigrated to the United States from Galicia, a part of Austria, which today is a part of Poland, with his father coming in 1906 to seek work and his mother following four years later. His father, working first as a house painter, earned enough money to start a small business selling ice, coal, wood, seltzer, and prohibition beer (less than 1/2 of 1% alcohol). Adler was given the Hebrew name Yitzchak, anglicized on his birth certificate as Isaac. His name was changed to Irving by a school clerk when he was enrolled in elementary school. Adler was accelerated in school five times, entering Townsend Harris High School at age 11, and beginning City College (CCNY) when he was 14. During his junior year he was awarded the Belden Gold Medal for excellence in mathematics and a silver medal for ranking second in the college. Adler graduated magna cum laude from CCNY in 1931, when he was 18.

Adler began his teaching career with a one-year appointment as a teacher-in-training at Stuyvesant High School. After being licensed as a regular teacher, he taught for 3 years as a substitute teacher during a period when the Board of Education, in violation of state law, refused to fill vacancies with regular teachers entitled to full benefits. He joined the Unemployed Teachers Association, which filed a lawsuit that resulted in 3,500 teachers, including Adler, being elevated from substitute to regular status in one day.

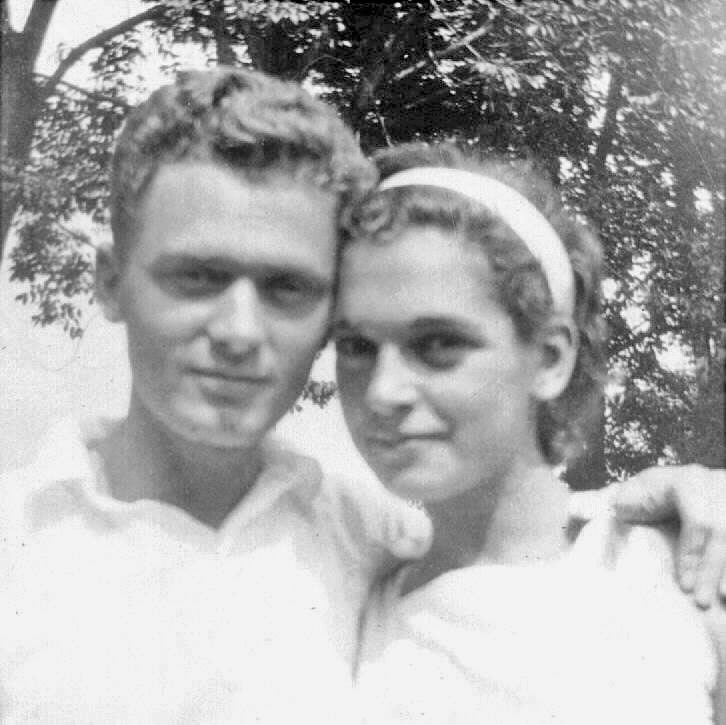
Irving and Ruth Adler in 1935

In the course of Adler's activities in the student peace movement of the 1930s, he met Ruth Relis, a Barnard College student whom he married when she graduated in 1935. Irving and Ruth Adler had two children, Stephen and Peggy.

Adler taught mathematics at various New York City high schools during the 1930s and 1940s. He was chair of the math department at Straubenmuller Textile High School from 1946 until 1952. He was also an active member of the New York City Teachers Union, Local 5 of the American Federation of Teachers, and was drafted into a leadership role as a member of its executive board, chairman of the educational policy committee, and then as chairman of the salary and legislative committee.

== Adler v. Board of Education ==
After President Harry Truman issued an executive order in 1947 calling for loyalty investigations of federal employees, New York State adopted the "Feinberg Law" in 1949 providing for the dismissal of teachers who belonged to "subversive organizations". The New York Teachers' Union won a suit challenging the constitutionality of the Feinberg Law in the New York State Supreme Court, but the decision was reversed on appeal to the federal courts. The United States Supreme Court decided against the teachers in a 6–3 decision in 1952, in a case that became known as Adler vs. Board of Education because Adler was the plaintiff with the earliest name alphabetically.

Before the Feinberg Law was implemented, the New York Superintendent of Schools, William Jansen, began calling in teachers for questioning. Union leaders and active members were asked the same question being asked of those subpoenaed before the House Un-American Activities Committee, "Are you now or have you ever been a member of the Communist Party?" On the advice of counsel, most refused to answer on the grounds that the question was a violation of section 26a of the New York Civil Service Law that prohibited questioning civil service employees about their political affiliation. Those who refused to answer the question, Adler among them, were dismissed for "insubordination and conduct unbecoming a teacher." Adler was suspended in 1952 and dismissed in 1954. He later admitted being a member of the Communist Party.

In 1967, the U.S. Supreme Court reversed itself in a subsequent case, Keyishian v. Board of Regents. The teachers who had been fired in the 1950s then sued for reinstatement. Adler was reinstated and retired from the city schools in 1977, with his pension rights restored.

== Career as an author ==
Adler wrote his first science book for children, The Secret of Light, while still working as a teacher. It was published by International Publishers in 1952. In 1955, he began a long association with the John Day Company, his first title for them being Time in Your Life. Although the majority of Adler's books were published by the John Day Company, he had seven published by Alfred A. Knopf, under the pen name "Robert Irving", and several by Golden Press and Doubleday under his own name. Adler wrote six books a year for many years, mostly on scientific subjects for the junior-high and high-school levels.

A book Adler wrote for adults in 1958, The New Mathematics, was important in the "New Math" curriculum reform movement, and led to his frequent appearances at educational meetings throughout North America.

In 1959, Irving and Ruth Adler together began writing "The Reason Why" series of books about scientific concepts for elementary school children. Adler also wrote The Giant Golden Book of Mathematics followed by a series of six arithmetic workbooks for grade-school children, aptly named Mathematics - Grade 1 through Mathematics - Grade 6. His workbooks eventually sold about 28 million copies worldwide.

Irving and Ruth Adler moved from their home in Bayside, New York, to Shaftsbury, Vermont, at the end of 1960. In 1961, Irving Adler completed his doctorate in mathematics at Columbia University under supervision of Ellis Kolchin. After moving to Vermont, he became the chairman of a committee of Vermont peace organizations that mobilized against atmospheric testing of atomic weapons; led a contingent from southern Vermont to the 1963 March on Washington; and was president of a group called the Vermont-in-Mississippi Corporation that supported civil rights activities in the southern U.S.

Ruth Adler died of cancer in early 1968. Later that year, Irving Adler married Joyce Sparer, a long-time family friend who had been teaching in Guyana. Irving and Joyce Sparer Adler co-authored Language and Man (1970), after which she pursued her own writings. After the death of Joyce's daughter Ellen, her three children came to live with them in Shaftsbury in 1977, and Adler retired from writing full-time. In 1984, the Adlers embarked on an around-the-world lecture tour, speaking at universities in Australia, New Zealand, and several countries in Asia, and Europe.

== Fibonacci numbers and phyllotaxis ==
In the late 1970s, Adler turned his attention to the question of phyllotaxis, specifically to the arrangement of plant spirals according to the Fibonacci sequence. His papers in the Journal of Theoretical Biology serve as the basis for a revival of interest in the subject. In 2012, a compilation of these papers was published in the book Solving the Riddle of Phyllotaxis by World Scientific Publishing. The book's foreword is by Adler's son, Stephen L. Adler, and the diagrams by his daughter, Peggy Adler. Adler gave lectures about phyllotaxis at many universities and conferences in the United States and internationally, including the University of Kansas, The Institute for Advanced Study, and West Point.

== Honors and awards ==
- Belden Gold Medal for Excellence in Mathematics (1927)
- National Science Foundation fellowship (1959)
- New York State Association for Supervision and Curriculum Development award for Outstanding Contributions to Children's Literature (1961) (with Ruth Adler)
- National Science Teachers Association/ Children's Book Council citations for Outstanding Science Books for Children (1972, 1975, 1980, and 1990)
- American Association for the Advancement of Science fellow (1982)
- Vermont Academy of Arts and Sciences fellow (1985)
- Saint Michael's College honorary Doctorate of Science (1990)
- Townsend Harris Hall of Fame, (1996)
- Townsend Harris Medal
- City College of New York honorary Doctorate of Humane Letters (2002)
- Vermont ACLU lifetime achievement award for "nearly a century's dedication to making the world a more just and humane place through an unswerving belief in individual rights and equal treatment under the law." (2009)

== Works ==
- The Secret of Light (1952)
- Discover the Stars, (1954), with Gaylord Johnson
- Fire in Your Life (1955)
- Time in Your Life (1955)
- Hurricanes and Twisters, (1955), written as Robert Irving
- Rocks and Minerals and the Story They Tell, (1956), written as Robert Irving
- The Stars: Steppingstones Into Space (1956)
- Tools in Your Life (1956)
- What We Want From Our Schools (1957)
- Monkey Business: Hoaxes in the Name of Science (1957)
- Man-Made Moons (1957)
- Magic House of Numbers (1957)
- How Life Began (1957)
- Dust (1958)
- Mathematics: The Story of Numbers, Symbols and Space (1958)
- The New Mathematics (1958)
- The Sun and Its Family (1958)
- The Tools of Science (1958)
- Energy and Power, (1958), written as Robert Irving
- Weather in Your Life (1959)
- Seeing the Earth From Space (1959)
- Hot and Cold (1959)
- Sound and Ultrasonics, (1959), written as Robert Irving
- Temperature in Your Life (1960)
- Electromagnetic Waves, (1960) written as Robert Irving
- Light in Your Life (1961)
- Thinking Machines (1961)
- Electronics, (1961), written as Robert Irving
- Mathematics Workbook with Self-Teaching Text and Learning Exercises (1962)
- Color in Your Life (1962)
- Volcanoes and Earthquakes, (1962), written as Robert Irving
- Inside the Nucleus (1963)
- Probability and Statistics for Every Man (1963)
- A New Look at Arithmetic (1964)
- Logic for Beginners (1964)
- The Elementary Mathematics of the Atom (1965)
- Electricity in your Life (1965)
- A New Look at Geometry (1966)
- The Wonders of Physics (1966)
- Groups in the New Mathematics (1968)
- Mathematics and Mental Growth (1968)

Works Written with his wife, Ruth Adler

- Numbers Old and New (1960)
- Things that Spin (1960)
- Rivers (1961)
- Shadows (1961)
- The Story of a Nail (1961)
- Why? A Book of Reasons (1961)
- Your Eyes (1962)
- Oceans (1962)
- Insects and plants (1962)
- Air (1962)
- Storms (1963)
- Your Ears (1963)
- Why and How? (1963)
- The Earth's Crust (1963)
- Irrigation (1964)
- Numerals: New Dresses for Old Numbers (1964)
- Fibers (1964)
- Heat (1964)
- Houses (1964)
- Machines (1964)
- Coal (1965)
- Evolution (1965)
- Atoms and Molecules (1966)
- Taste, Touch and Smell (1966)
- Magnets (1966)
- Tree Products (1967)
- Sets (1967)
- The Calendar (1967)
- Communication (1967)
- Directions and Angles (1969)
- Sets and Numbers for the Very Young (1969)

== Professional listings and archives ==
- Something About the Author: Autobiography Series, Volume 15, Thomson Gale, 2006, pages 1–23.
- Something About the Author, Volume 1, Gale Research Inc., 1971, pages 2–4.
- Children's Literature Research Collection, University of Minnesota
- The Mathematics Genealogy Project
- Tamiment Library Guide to the Irving Adler Papers @ the Tamiment Collection
