= Frost Farm (Korpi Rd., Dublin, New Hampshire) =

Historic house in New Hampshire, United States

- U.S. National Register of Historic Places
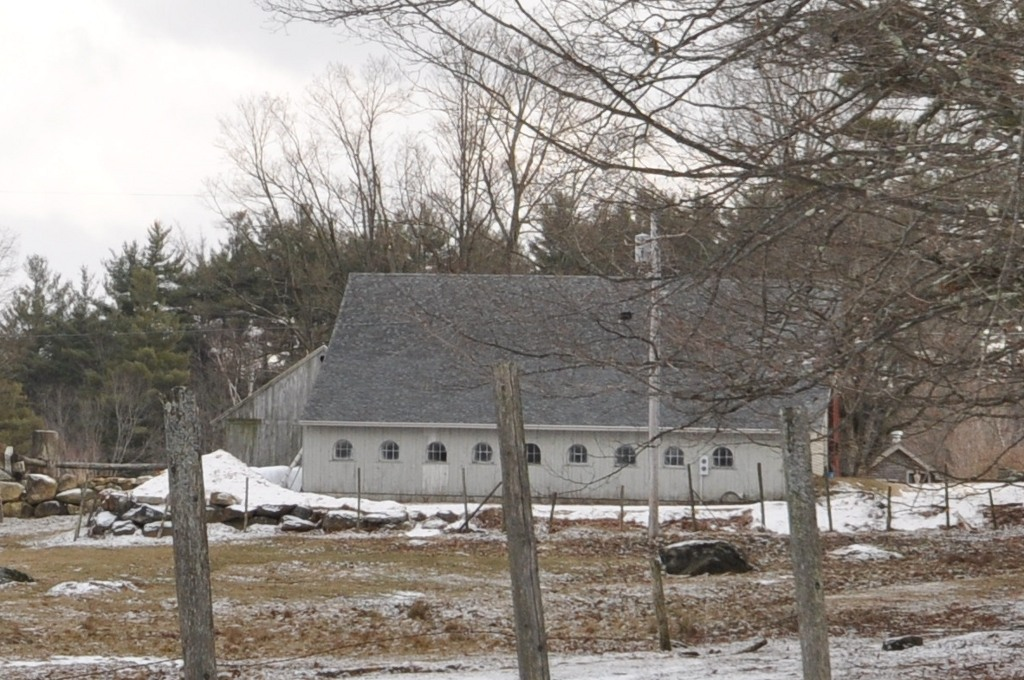
- The barn

- Location within New Hampshire Location within the United States
- Location: Korpi Rd., Dublin, New Hampshire
- Coordinates: 42°52′15″N 72°1′35″W
- Area: 1.3 acres (0.53 ha)
- Built: 1806
- Built by: Benjamin Frost
- Architectural style: Cape Colonial
- MPS: Dublin MRA
- NRHP reference No.: 83004026
- Added to NRHP: December 18, 1983

The Frost Farm is a historic farmstead on Korpi Road in Dublin, New Hampshire. It includes a farmhouse built in 1806 and subsequently enlarged, and a renovated 19th-century barn. The property is significant for its architecture, and for its ownership by both early settlers and later Finnish immigrants. A portion of the property was listed on the National Register of Historic Places in 1983.

== Description and history ==
The Frost Farm is located in a rural setting of southeastern Dublin, straddling Korpi Road east of its junction with Craig Road. North of the road is the farmhouse, a rambling two-story gable-roofed structure with a clapboarded exterior. South of the road is the barn, which was renovated in the second half of the 20th century, using recycled and period wooden materials.

The oldest portion of the farmhouse is a small Cape-style portion that was built in 1806 by Benjamin Frost. Frost, a native of nearby Jaffrey, attempted to operate a grist mill nearby, but failed due to a lack of adequate water power. The property was sold out of the Frost family in 1852.

The house was purchased in 1913 by Konstu Korpi, a Finnish immigrant, who substantially enlarged it in 1914 and in the 1950s. It became a meeting point for the small local Finnish-American community, and as a boarding house for Finnish-American woodworkers.

== See also ==
- Frost Farm (Old Marlborough Rd., Dublin, New Hampshire)
- National Register of Historic Places listings in Cheshire County, New Hampshire
