= Joyce Sparer Adler =

American dramatist

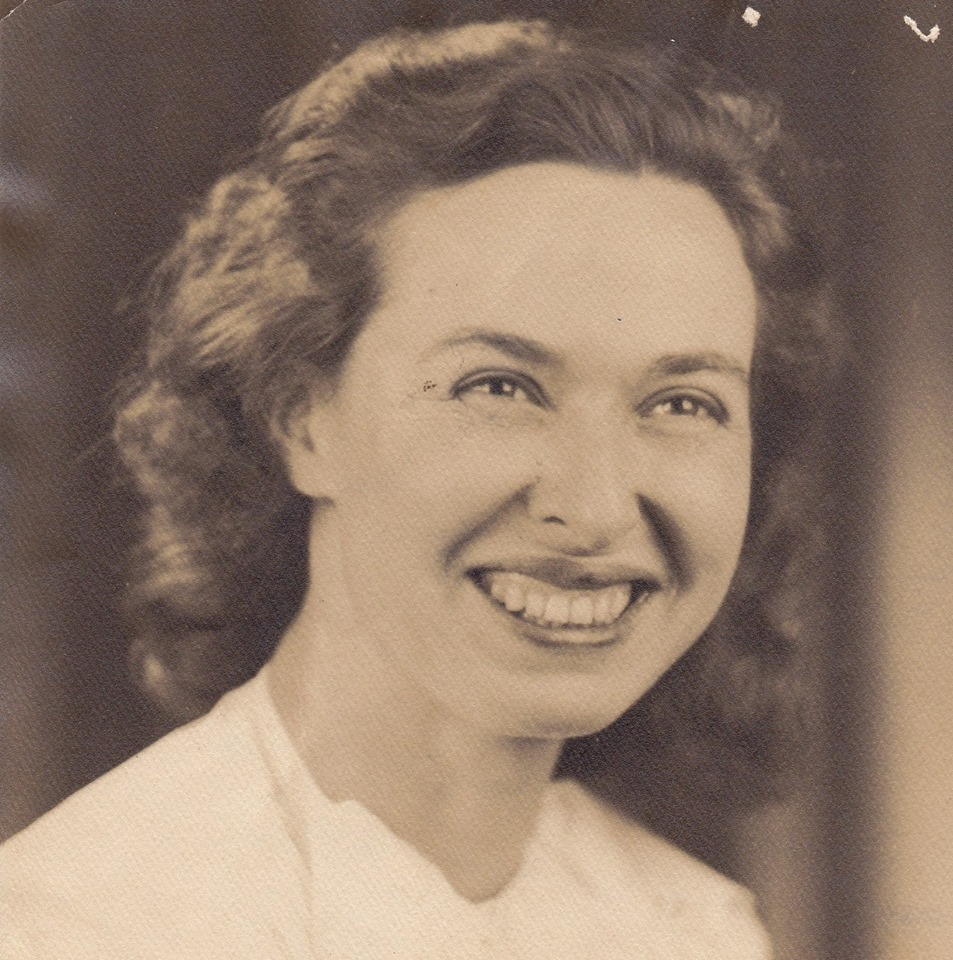
- Born: December 2, 1915; New York City, New York, U.S.
- Died: September 13, 1999 (aged 83)
- Occupations: Critic, playwright and teacher
- Known for: Founding faculty-member of University of Guyana

Joyce Sparer Adler (December 2, 1915 – September 13, 1999) was an American critic, playwright, and teacher. She was a founding member of the faculty of the University of Guyana, writer of important critical analyses of Wilson Harris and Herman Melville, and 1988 president of the Melville Society.

== Biography ==
Joyce Sparer Adler was born in New York City, the daughter of Louis and Lillian (Solomon) Lifshutz. She received a B.A. cum laude from Brooklyn College in 1935, and an M.A. in 1951. Her first marriage, to Max Sparer, ended in divorce. She had two daughters, Ellen and Laura.

She was an English teacher in the New York City public school system, and an active member of the teachers' union. She resigned from her teaching position in 1954 . She held a number of jobs during the 1950s, including writing television screenplays and editing for the journal Blood.

In 1963 she traveled to Georgetown, Guyana as a member of a small group recruited to conduct seminars for teachers in the colony of British Guiana, after which she was invited by Premier Cheddi Jagan to return and be a founding member of the University of Guyana. She stayed for five years, during which time she was actively involved in the political events that led to the independence of Guyana from Great Britain. She was a friend of many Guyanese political figures, including Cheddi Jagan and Janet Jagan who each later served as president.

While in Guyana, she wrote the study Attitudes Towards 'Race' in Guyanese Literature (San Juan: University of Puerto Rico, 1968). She became especially involved with the work of Guyanese author Wilson Harris, becoming one of the leading international authorities on his work. In 1997 she served as guest editor of a special issue of The Review of Contemporary Fiction devoted to Harris. Adler's many writings about Harris, originally published in a variety of journals, were published posthumously as the book Exploring the Palace of the Peacock: Essays on Wilson Harris (Kingston: University of the West Indies Press, 2003). ISBN 976-640-140-3).

In 1968, she returned to the United States after marrying mathematician and author Irving Adler. She lived in Shaftsbury, Vermont for the remainder of her life, raising three of her grandchildren after the death of her daughter Ellen in 1975.

Shortly after coming to Vermont she began work on her book War in Melville's Imagination (New York: New York University Press, 1981. ISBN 0-8147-0575-8).

She adapted three Melville novels as plays, published as the book Dramatizations of Three Melville Novels, with an Introduction on Interpretation by Dramatization (Edwin Mellen Press, 1992. ISBN 0-7734-9443-X). Her play Melville, Billy and Mars, a dramatization of Billy Budd, premiered at the University of Kansas in 1995. Her dramatization of Moby-Dick received its first dramatic reading in Kahului, Hawaii at an international meeting of the Melville Society in 2003. Her Benito Cereno was first staged at the New Bedford Whaling Museum in New Bedford, Massachusetts in 2005.

Adler traveled extensively, speaking at conferences and universities around the world, including Australia, Belgium, China, Hong Kong, India, Japan, Malaysia, New Zealand, and Singapore.

In addition to her professional work, Adler was a committed social activist who engaged in many peace and civil rights movements throughout her life.
