= Solving the Riddle of Phyllotaxis =

2012 book by Irving Adler

- First edition
- Author: Irving Adler
- Genre: Non-fiction
- Publisher: World Scientific
- Publication date: 2012

Solving the Riddle of Phyllotaxis: Why the Fibonacci Numbers and the Golden Ratio Occur in Plants is a book on the mathematics of plant structure, and in particular on phyllotaxis, the arrangement of leaves on plant stems. It was written by Irving Adler, and published in 2012 by World Scientific. The Basic Library List Committee of the Mathematical Association of America has suggested its inclusion in undergraduate mathematics libraries.

== Background ==
Irving Adler (1913–2012) was known as a peace protester, schoolteacher, and children's science book author before, in 1961, earning a doctorate in abstract algebra. Even later in his life, Adler began working on phyllotaxis, the mathematical structure of leaves on plant stems. This book, which collects several of his papers on the subject previously published in journals and edited volumes, is the last of his 85 books to be published before his death.

== Topics ==
Different plants arrange their leaves differently, for instance on alternating sides of the plant stem, or rotated from each other by other fractions of a full rotation between consecutive leaves. In these patterns, rotations by 1/2 of an angle, 1/3 of an angle, 3/8 of an angle, or 5/8 of an angle are common, and it does not appear to be coincidental that the numerators and denominators of these fractions are all Fibonacci numbers. Higher Fibonacci numbers often appear in the number of spiral arms in the spiraling patterns of sunflower seed heads, or the helical patterns of pineapple cells. The theme of Adler's work in this area, in the papers reproduced in this volume, was to find a mathematical model for plant development that would explain these patterns and the occurrence of the Fibonacci numbers and the golden ratio within them.

The papers are arranged chronologically; they include four journal papers from the 1970s, another from the late 1990s, and a preface and book chapter also from the 1990s. Among them, the first is the longest, and reviewer Adhemar Bultheel calls it "the most fundamental"; it uses the idea of "contact pressure" to cause plant parts to maximize their distance from each other and maintain a consistent angle of divergence from each other, and makes connections with the mathematical theories of circle packing and space-filling curves. Subsequent papers refine this theory, make additional connections for instance to the theory of continued fractions, and provide a more general overview.

Interspersed with the theoretical results in this area are historical asides discussing, among others, the work on phyllotaxis of Theophrastus (the first to study phyllotaxis), Leonardo da Vinci (the first to apply mathematics to phyllotaxis), Johannes Kepler (the first to recognize the importance of the Fibonacci numbers to phyllotaxis), and later naturalists and mathematicians.

== Audience and reception ==
Reviewer Peter Ruane found the book gripping, writing that it can be read by a mathematically inclined reader with no background knowledge in phyllotaxis. He suggests, however, that it might be easier to read the papers in the reverse of their chronological order, as the broader overview papers were written later in this sequence. And Yuri V. Rogovchenko calls its publication "a thoughtful tribute to Dr. Adler’s multi-faceted career as a researcher, educator, political activist, and author".
