= Nathan Adler (psychologist) =

American psychoanalyst (1911–1994)

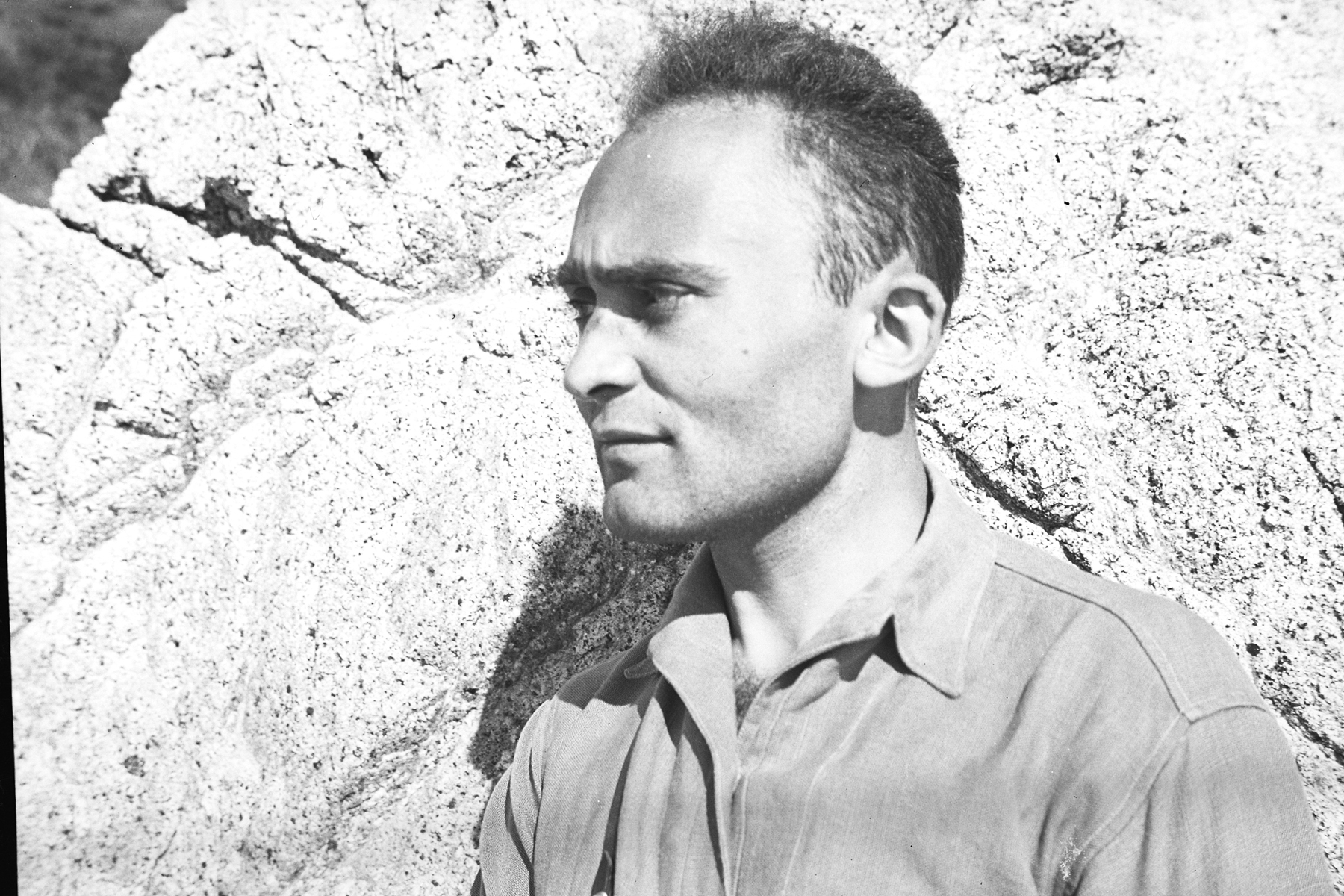
- Born: February 11, 1911; New York City
- Died: May 2, 1994 (aged 83); Mill Valley, California
- Occupations: Psychologist, writer
- Relatives: Irving Adler (brother)

Nathan Adler (1911–1994) was an American psychoanalyst, a lecturer in Criminology and Psychology at the University of California, Berkeley, and professor of clinical psychology at the California School of Professional Psychology at Berkeley/Alameda. Between 1965 and 1970 he conducted extensive clinical studies of drug users in the San Francisco Bay area. He authored the book The Underground Stream: New Lifestyles and the Antinomian Personality. In his youth, he wrote for several prominent leftist journals in New York and served on the editorial board of the New Masses.

== Early life ==
Nathan Adler was born in New York City, the second of five children. His siblings were Martha, Irving, Bob, and Ray. His parents emigrated to the United States from a part of Austria that is now in Poland. His father Marcus arrived in 1906 and his mother Celia (née Kress) arrived four years later along with his elder sister, Martha. After moving to San Francisco, he worked for the Jewish Personal Service Committee, providing counseling for inmates at San Quentin and Alcatraz prisons. He began his studies in psychology in San Francisco under the mentorship of Siegfried Bernfeld and served on the board of the Mental Hygiene Society of Northern California. In 1943 he married Elizabeth Haverstock Adler (1912 - 2006), a public health educator who taught at the UC Berkeley School of Public Health.

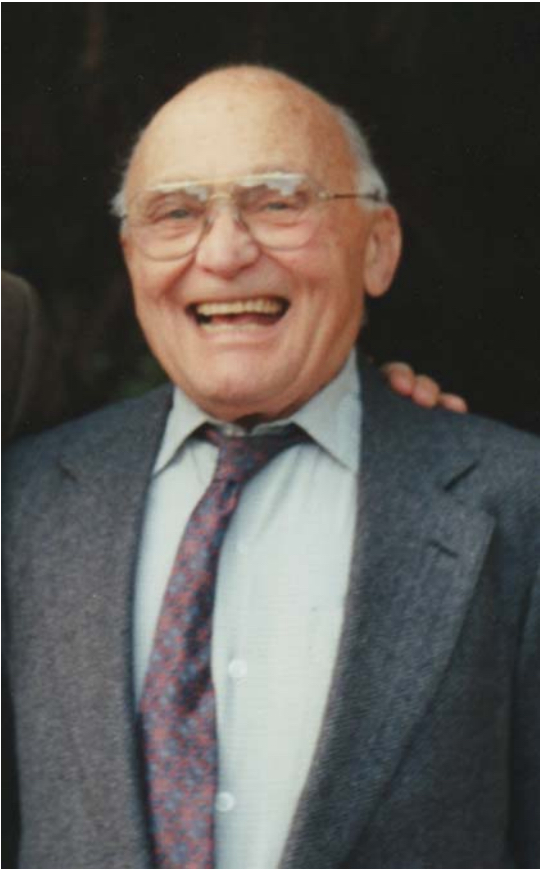
A photo of Nathan Adler circa 1994
