= South Shaftsbury, Vermont =

Census-designated place in Vermont, United States

- Census-designated place
- Location within Vermont
- Coordinates: 42°56′28″N 73°12′07″W
- Country: United States
- State: Vermont
- County: Bennington
- Town: Shaftsbury

Area
  - Total: 2.2 sq mi (5.8 km^{2})
  - Land: 2.2 sq mi (5.8 km^{2})
  - Water: 0 sq mi (0.0 km^{2})
- Elevation: 932 ft (284 m)

Population (2020)
  - Total: 681
  - Density: 300/sq mi (120/km^{2})
- Time zone: UTC-5 (Eastern (EST))
  - Summer (DST): UTC-4 (EDT)
- ZIP code: 05262 (Shaftsbury)
- Area code: 802
- FIPS code: 50-68200
- GNIS feature ID: 2378358

South Shaftsbury is a census-designated place (CDP) in the town of Shaftsbury in Bennington County, Vermont, United States. The population was 681 at the 2020 census.

American poet Robert Frost lived in the area in two separate farms, The Gully and the Stone House, which is now a museum. While residing in the area he wrote poems like Stopping by Woods on a Snowy Evening and other poems in his Pulitzer Prize-winning collection, New Hampshire and received two Pulitzer Prizes.

== Geography ==
South Shaftsbury is located along the southern border of the town of Shaftsbury. It is the largest settlement in the town. The CDP includes the village of South Shaftsbury as well as rural land extending east to U.S. Route 7, a super two freeway. The closest access from US 7 is 1 mile (1.6 km) south of the village in northern Bennington. Vermont Route 7A (the old alignment of US 7) and Vermont Route 67 intersect in the village, with VT 7A leading north to Arlington and Manchester and south into Bennington, while VT 67 leads west to North Bennington and the New York state line.

According to the United States Census Bureau, the CDP has a total area of 2.2 square miles (5.8 km^{2}), all land.

== Demographics ==
As of the census of 2000, there were 772 people, 306 households, and 230 families residing in the CDP. The population density was 131.3 people/km^{2} (340 people/mi^{2}). There were 319 housing units at an average density of 54.3 units/km^{2} (141 units/mi^{2}). The racial makeup of the CDP was 98.70% White, 0.52% Asian, and 0.78% from two or more races.

There were 306 households, out of which 32.4% had children under the age of 18 living with them, 60.5% were married couples living together, 12.1% had a female householder with no husband present, and 24.8% were non-families. 21.6% of all households were made up of individuals, and 11.1% had someone living alone who was 65 years of age or older. The average household size was 2.52 and the average family size was 2.91.

In the CDP, the population was spread out, with 24.6% under the age of 18, 6.5% from 18 to 24, 27.6% from 25 to 44, 24.2% from 45 to 64, and 17.1% who were 65 years of age or older. The median age was 40 years. For every 100 females, there were 98.5 males. For every 100 females age 18 and over, there were 91.4 males.

The median income for a household in the CDP was $42,708, and the median income for a family was $46,500. Males had a median income of $30,833 versus $23,125 for females. The per capita income for the CDP was $18,729. About 2.2% of families and 1.8% of the population were below the poverty line, including 2.3% of those under age 18 and none of those age 65 or over.
