= Frost Farm (Old Marlborough Rd., Dublin, New Hampshire) =

Historic house in New Hampshire, United States

- U.S. National Register of Historic Places
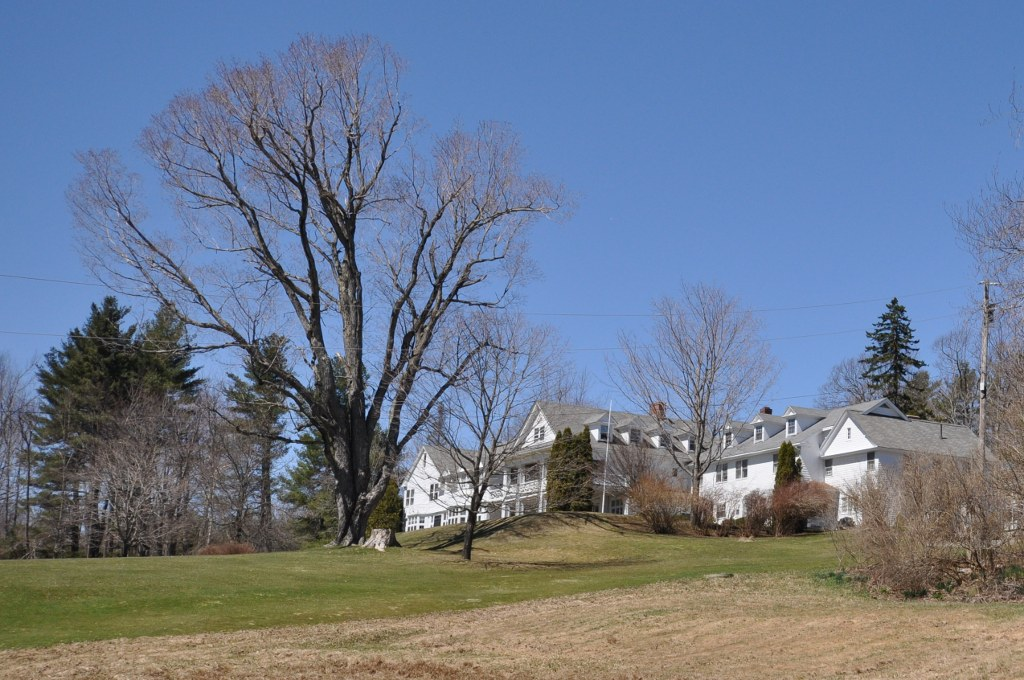

- Location within New Hampshire Location within the United States
- Location: 18 Fairwood Dr., Dublin, New Hampshire
- Coordinates: 42°53′54″N 72°6′37″W
- Area: 1.7 acres (0.69 ha)
- Built: 1855
- Architectural style: Colonial Revival, Georgian Revival
- MPS: Dublin MRA
- NRHP reference No.: 83004027
- Added to NRHP: December 15, 1983

The Frost Farm is a historic farmstead at 18 Fairwood Drive in Dublin, New Hampshire, United States. Built in 1855 and extensively restyled in 1910, it is a good example of a Georgian Revival summer house, with expansive views of nearby Mount Monadnock. The property was listed on the National Register of Historic Places in 1983. It is now home to the Fairwood Bible Institute.

== Description and history ==
The former Frost Farm property is located in a rural setting west of Dublin Pond, on the north side of Old Marlborough west of Charcoal Road. It is a rambling 2 1/2-story wood-frame structure, with a clapboarded exterior and a variety of rooflines. Covered porches line some portions of the building, and some of its roofs are pierced by rows of gabled dormers. The property includes a number of later 20th-century outbuildings, including a chapel and barns.

The oldest portion of this farmstead was a vernacular rectangular farmhouse built c. 1855 by Silas Frost. In 1910 it was transformed into a much larger Georgian Revival summer house by Charles Aldworth, under the auspices of architects Densmore, LeClear and Robinson of Boston, Massachusetts. It was for two seasons the residence of the polar explorer, Admiral Richard E. Byrd. In 1951 it was acquired by The Kingdom Inc., which adapted it for its present use as a bible study school.

== See also ==
- National Register of Historic Places listings in Cheshire County, New Hampshire
