= Robert Frost Farm (South Shaftsbury, Vermont) =

- U.S. National Register of Historic Places
- Former U.S. National Historic Landmark
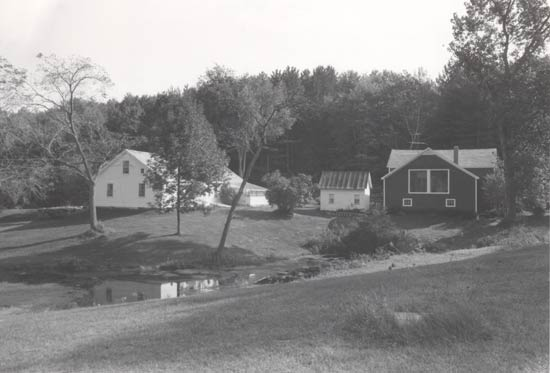
- National Park Service photo, 1974

- Location within Vermont Location within the United States
- Location: 0.25 mi. W of U.S. 7 on Buck Hill Rd., South Shaftsbury, Vermont
- Coordinates: 42°56′28″N 73°11′42″W
- Area: 153 acres (62 ha)
- Built: 1790
- NRHP reference No.: 68000047

Significant dates
- Added to NRHP: May 23, 1968
- Designated NHL: May 23, 1968
- Delisted NHL: March 5, 1986

The Robert Frost Farm, also known as "The Gully", is a historic farm property on Buck Hill Road in South Shaftsbury, Vermont. The 1790 farmstead was purchased in 1929 by poet Robert Frost, and served as his primary residence until 1938. During this period of residency, Frost was awarded two Pulitzer Prizes for his poetry. The property was designated a National Historic Landmark and listed on the National Register of Historic Places in 1968; its landmark designation was withdrawn in 1986 after its private owners made alterations that destroyed important historic elements of the property.

== Description and history ==
The former Frost Farm is located in southern Shaftsbury, a rural community in southwestern Vermont, on the south side of Buck Hill Road, roughly midway between United States Route 7 and Vermont Route 7A. It consists of 153 acres (62 ha) with a mix of fields and woods, with the main farm complex set on a drumlin with views to the north. The main house is a 1 1/2-story Cape, built about 1790, but altered somewhat by Frost after his purchase, and further altered by later owners. Also on the property are a barn and two smaller frame structures, the latter both used by Frost as writing studios.

The farm was purchased by Robert Frost in 1929, and was probably occupied by the family in 1930. Although it was the Frost's primary residence, it was generally only occupied by them on weekends and summers, when Frost's academic duties made it possible. Frost did a significant amount of writing while living here, and was awarded the Pulitzer Prize for Poetry in 1931 and 1937. After Frost's wife died in 1938, he spent much less time here. The property remained in the family until 1963, when it was sold to artist Kenneth Noland, who maintained it in sympathy to the Frost history. During his ownership period, the property was designated a National Historic Landmark, and listed on the National Register of Historic Places. A subsequent owner made incompatible alterations to the property in 1984, and the Park Service withdrew its landmark designation two years later. It remains listed on the National Register.

== See also ==
- National Register of Historic Places listings in Bennington County, Vermont
- List of National Historic Landmarks in Vermont
