= Robert Frost Farm (Ripton, Vermont) =

- U.S. National Register of Historic Places
- U.S. National Historic Landmark
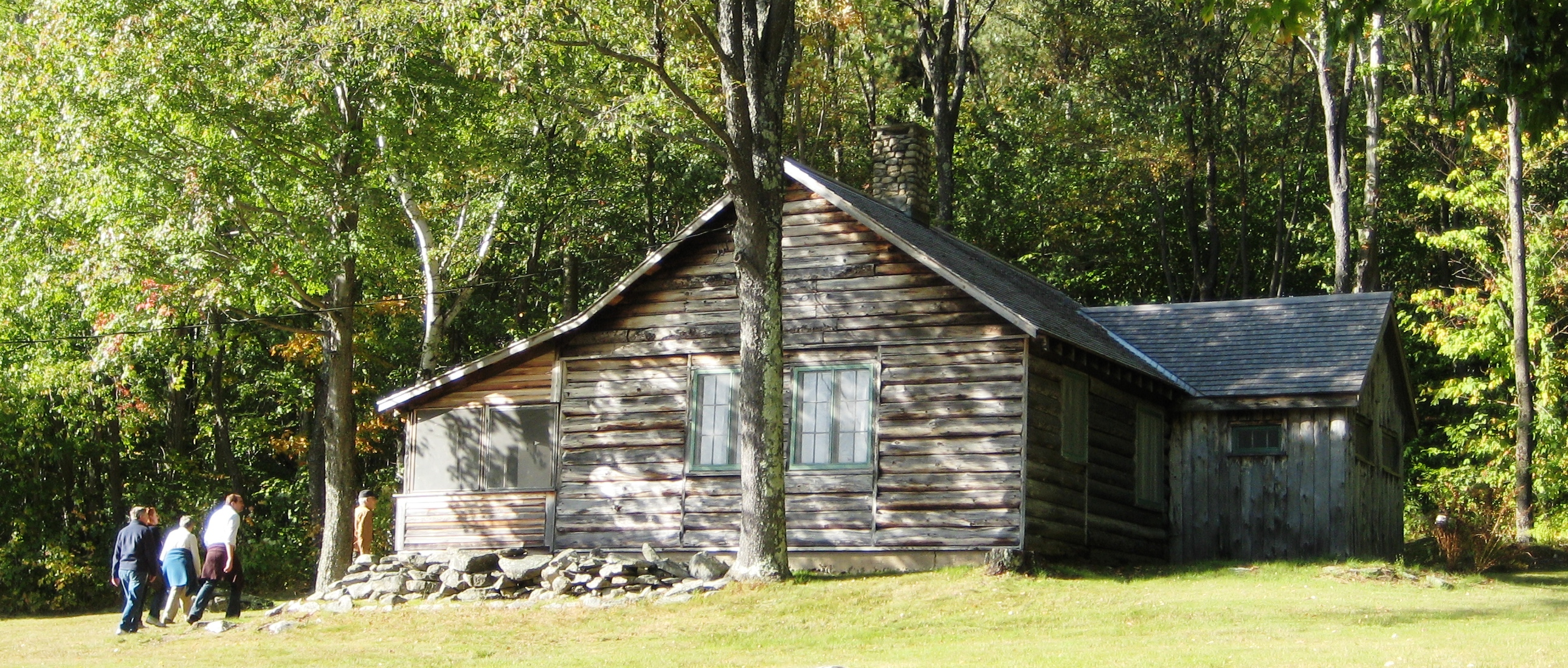
- Frost's cabin (pictured) is uphill from the Homer Noble farmhouse.

- Location within Vermont Location within the United States
- Nearest city: Ripton, Vermont
- Coordinates: 43°57′59″N 73°0′17″W
- Area: 150 acres (61 ha)
- Built: 1940
- NRHP reference No.: 68000046

Significant dates
- Added to NRHP: May 23, 1968
- Designated NHL: May 23, 1968

The Robert Frost Farm, also known as the Homer Noble Farm, is a National Historic Landmark in Ripton, Vermont. It is a 150-acre (61 ha) farm property off Vermont Route 125 in the Green Mountains where American poet Robert Frost (1874-1963) lived and wrote in the summer and fall months from 1939 until his death in 1963. The property, historically called the Homer Noble Farm, includes a nineteenth-century farmhouse and a rustic wooden writing cabin (where Frost often stayed). The property is now owned by Middlebury College. The grounds are open to the public during daylight hours.

== Description and history ==
The Frost Farm is set about 3 miles (4.8 km) east of the center of Ripton, down an access road on the north side of Vermont Route 125. The 150-acre (61 ha) property is surrounded on three sides by the Green Mountain National Forest, and partially abuts Middlebury College's Bread Loaf Campus property. A cleared meadow, located in the western portion of the property, is where its buildings are located. The principal buildings are the 19th-century farmhouse, and a modest cabin in which Frost did most of his writing. The farmhouse is a 1 1/2-story wood frame clapboarded structure, and is set on the west side of the end of the access road. The cabin, a roughly square log structure with a gable roof, stands near the northern edge of the cleared area. It has a screened porch on the west side and a shed-roof woodshed to the north. Its interior is divided into a living area occupying the southern half, with the northern part taken up by a kitchen, bath, and two small bedrooms. The area between the cabin and the house is taken up by a small apple orchard established and tended by Frost. Southwest of the house is a small shed, and on the east side of the drive are the foundational remnants of a barn that was standing during Frost's ownership.

Robert Frost (1874-1963) was one of the United States' most celebrated poets, publishing eleven volumes of poetry and winning four Pulitzer Prizes. Frost purchased this property in 1940, and lived here each summer and fall until his death. Five of his volumes were written here, most notably A Witness Tree, the 1943 Pulitzer Prize winner. In the cabin, where he did most of his writing, he kept an extensive collection of literature, which was donated by his family to the Jones Public Library of Amherst, Massachusetts. Frost's Morris Chair, originally in the cabin, is now on display at the Middlebury College Davis Family Library. The property was acquired by Middlebury College in 1966, which has maintained but not substantially improved it.

== See also ==
- Robert Frost Farm (Derry, New Hampshire)
- The Frost Place in Franconia, NH
- Robert Frost House in Cambridge, MA
- List of National Historic Landmarks in Vermont
- National Register of Historic Places listings in Addison County, Vermont
- List of residences of American writers
