= Robert Frost Farm (Derry, New Hampshire) =

Historic house in New Hampshire, United States

Robert Frost Farm Historic Site
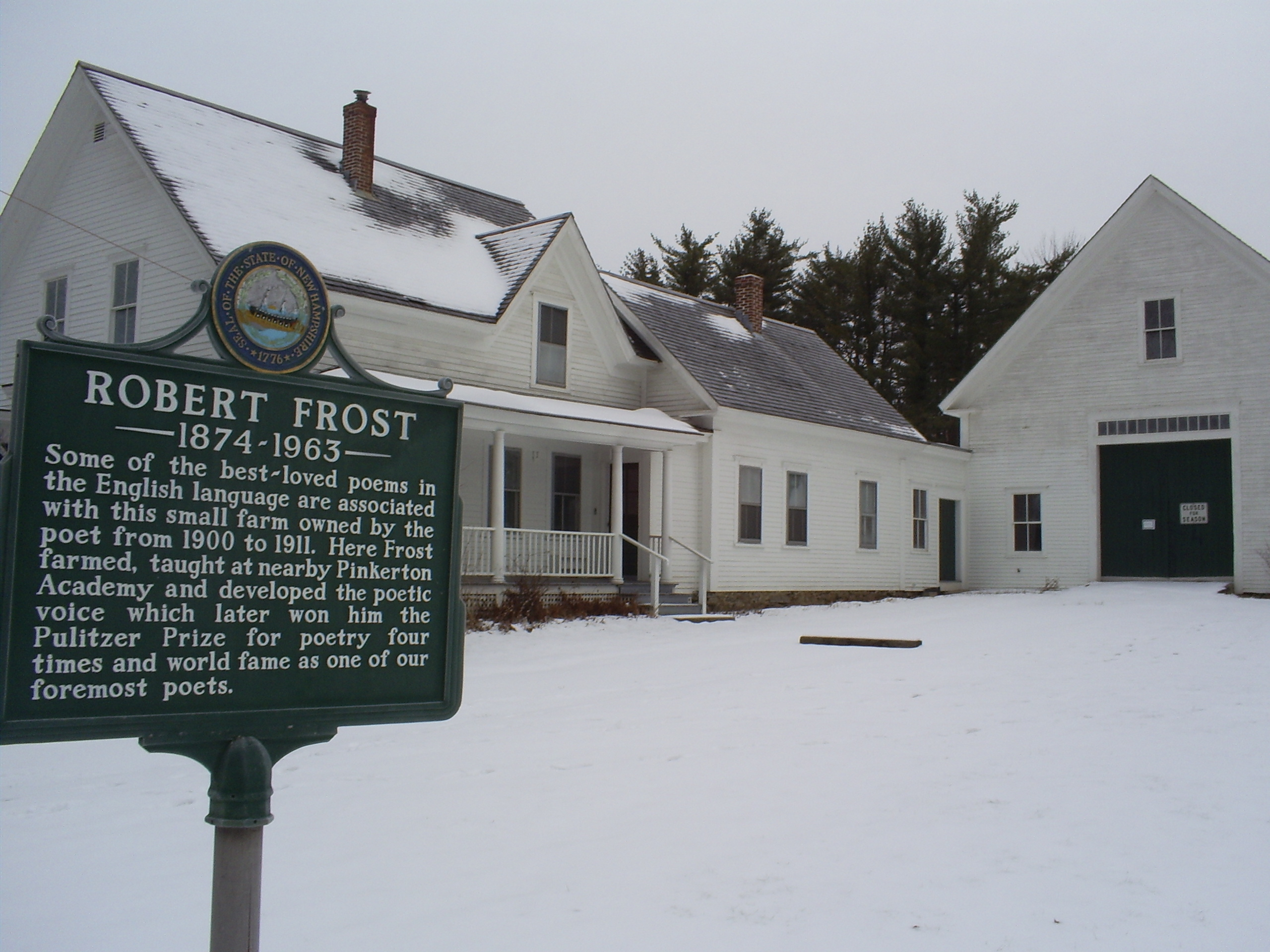
- The Robert Frost Farm

- Location within New Hampshire
- Interactive map of Robert Frost Farm Historic Site
- Location: 122 Rockingham Rd, Derry, New Hampshire
- Coordinates: 42°52′18″N 71°17′42″W
- Area: 64 acres (26 ha)
- Elevation: 456 feet (139 m)
- Administrator: New Hampshire Division of Parks and Recreation
- Designation: New Hampshire state park
- Website: Robert Frost Farm State Historic Site
- Robert Frost Homestead
- U.S. National Register of Historic Places
- U.S. National Historic Landmark
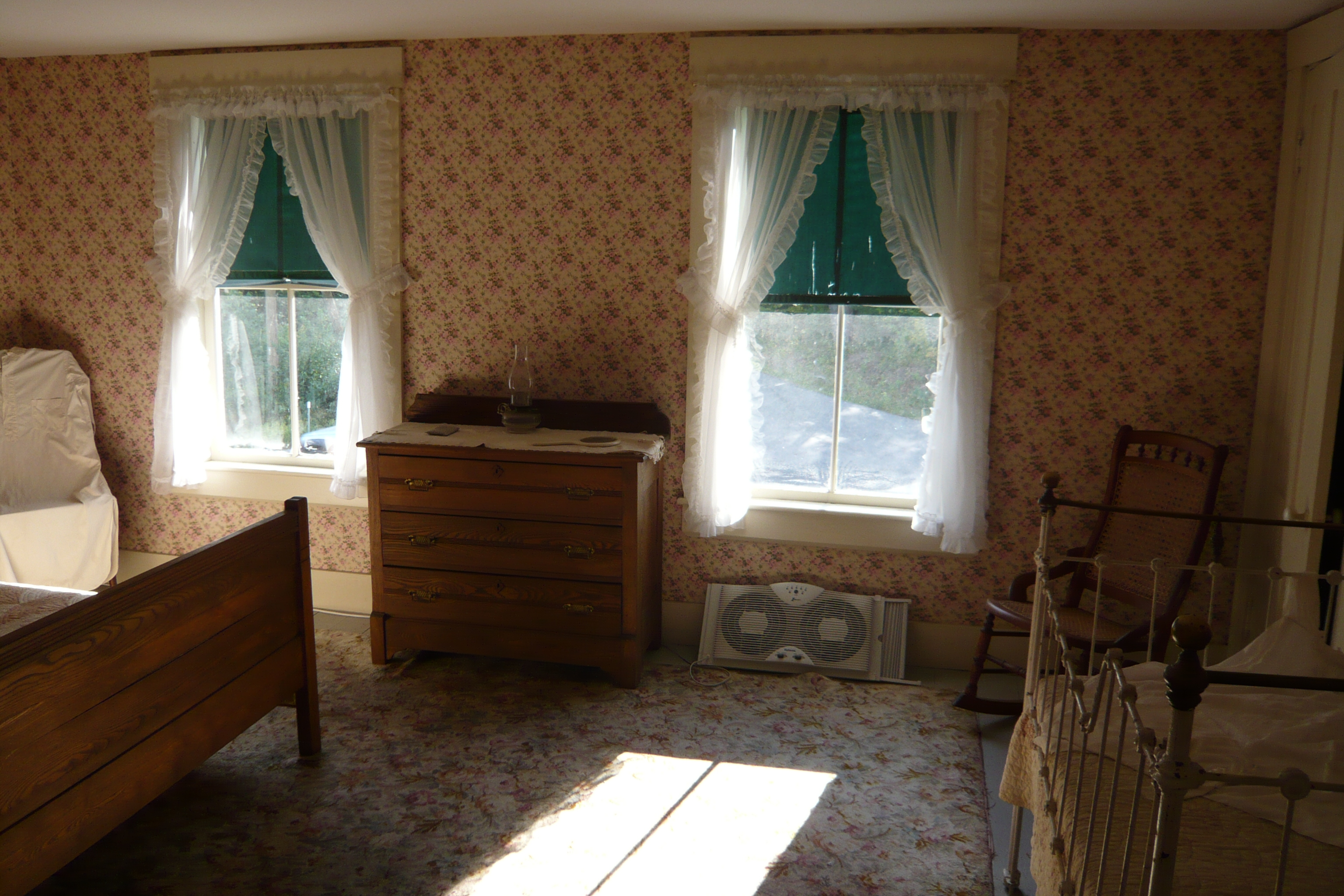
- Area: 13 acres (5.3 ha)
- Built: 1884
- NRHP reference No.: 68000008

Significant dates
- Added to NRHP: May 23, 1968
- Designated NHL: May 23, 1968

The Robert Frost Farm in Derry, New Hampshire is a two-story, clapboard, connected farm built in 1884. It was the home of poet Robert Frost from 1900 to 1911. Today it is a New Hampshire state park in use as a historic house museum. The property is listed in the National Register of Historic Places as the Robert Frost Homestead.

== History ==
Frost lived in the house from the fall of 1900 until it was sold in November 1911. The majority of the poems collected in his first two books, A Boy's Will and North of Boston, were written here. Many of the poems in his 1916 collection Mountain Interval were also written at the Derry farm. Frost once said, "There was something about the experience at Derry which stayed in my mind, and was tapped for poetry in the years that came after." During this period Frost also published a dozen articles for two agricultural trade journals: The Eastern Poultryman and The Farm-Poultry.

Elliott, first son of Frost and his wife Elinor, died on the farm in 1900 at age four, likely due to influenza. The other children were educated at home by their parents. Lesley Frost later recalled she was "taught the alphabet on a typewriter... My mother taught the organized subjects, reading (the phonetic method), writing (then known as penmanship), geography, spelling. My father took on botany and astronomy."

A hired man named Carl Burrell (and, occasionally, Burrell's father) assisted with farming duties like building hen coops, tending livestock, and picking apples and pears. Locals thought Frost was lazy as a farmer. He later recalled that they were correct: "I always liked to sit up all hours of the night planning some inarticulate crime, going out to work when the spirit moved me, something they shook their heads ominously at, with proper prejudice. They would talk among themselves about my lack of energy. I was a failure in their eyes from the start."

The family moved out in the fall of 1909 to rented lodgings in Derry Village while Frost taught at the Pinkerton Academy. They later moved to Plymouth, New Hampshire, so that Frost could teach at the Plymouth Normal School.

In the 1940s, after Frost had left the farm, the property took on use as a junk yard. The field behind the home was littered with hundreds of junk cars, and the home itself fell into disrepair. The property was obtained by the state of New Hampshire in 1964. By 1975, restorations were complete and the farm was opened for public visitation.

=== Modern history ===
The property, originally owned by Frost's grandfather, was declared a National Historic Landmark in 1968. The property is a New Hampshire state park.

It is located on the east side of Rockingham Road (New Hampshire Route 28), 2 miles (3 km) southeast of Derry Village. It is open to the public seasonally.

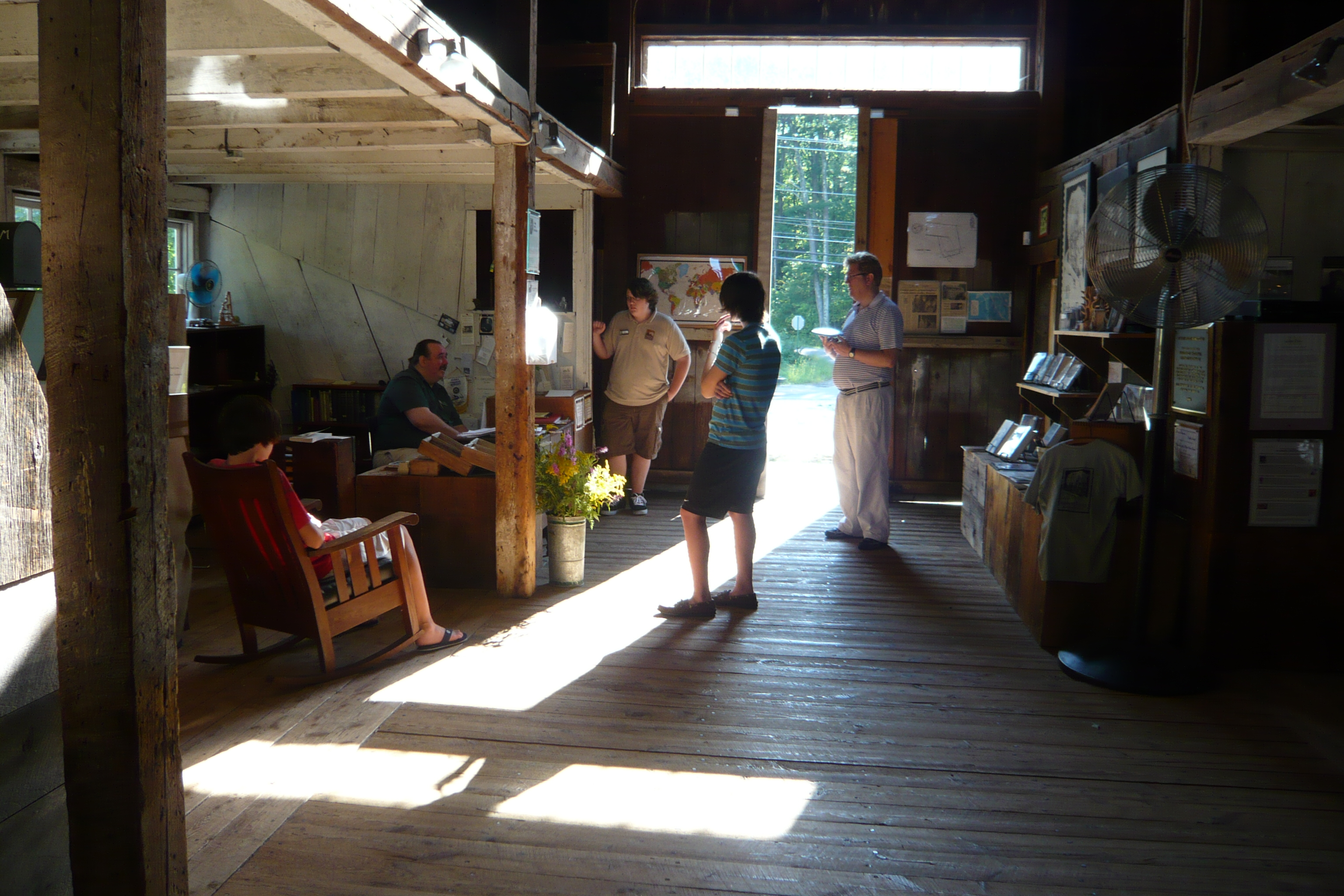
Visits to the information center in the barn and self-guided tours around the property are free. Guided tours are available for a fee.

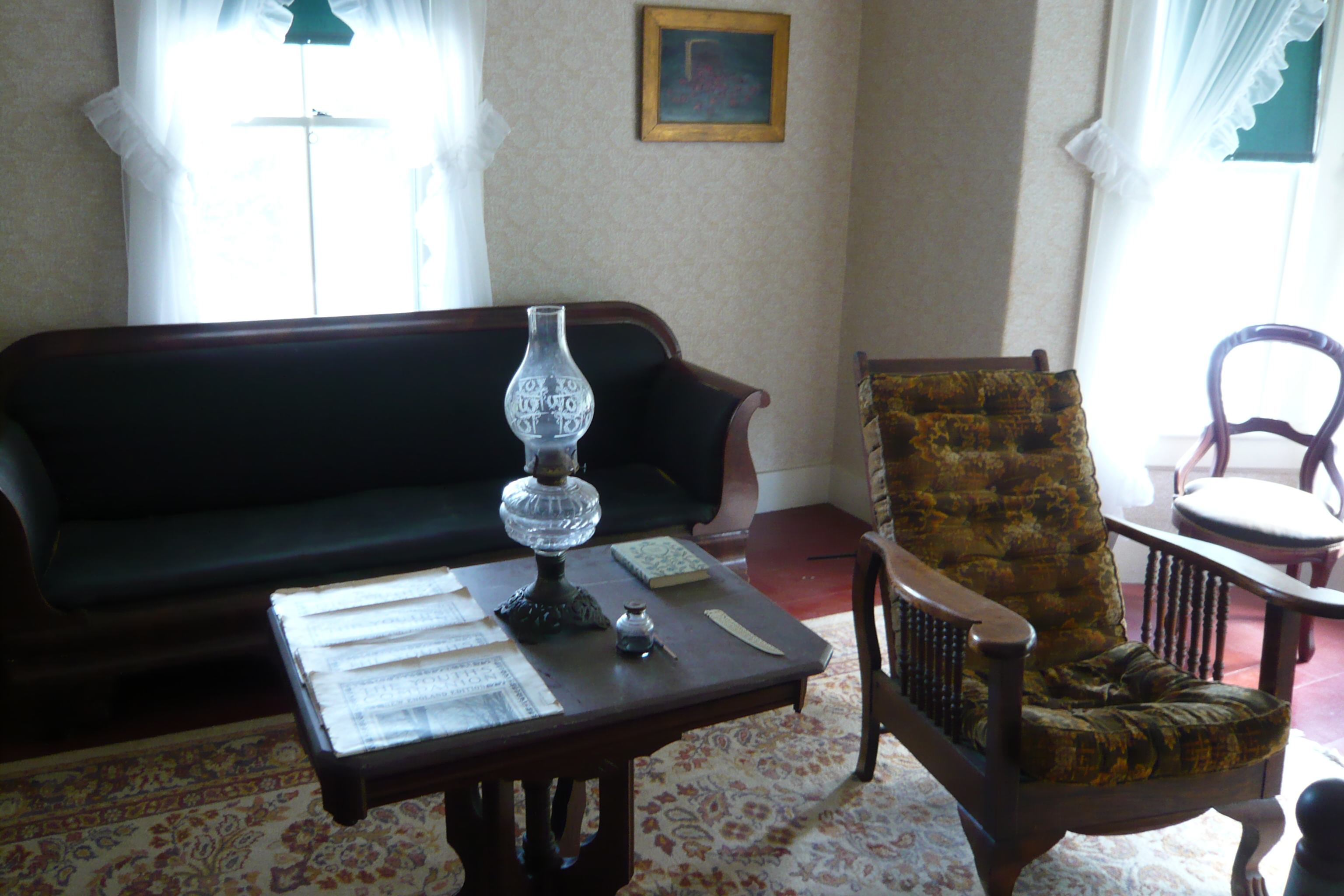
Chair similar to the one that Frost used for writing; on the table lie copies of The Youth's Companion which he read to his children and students.

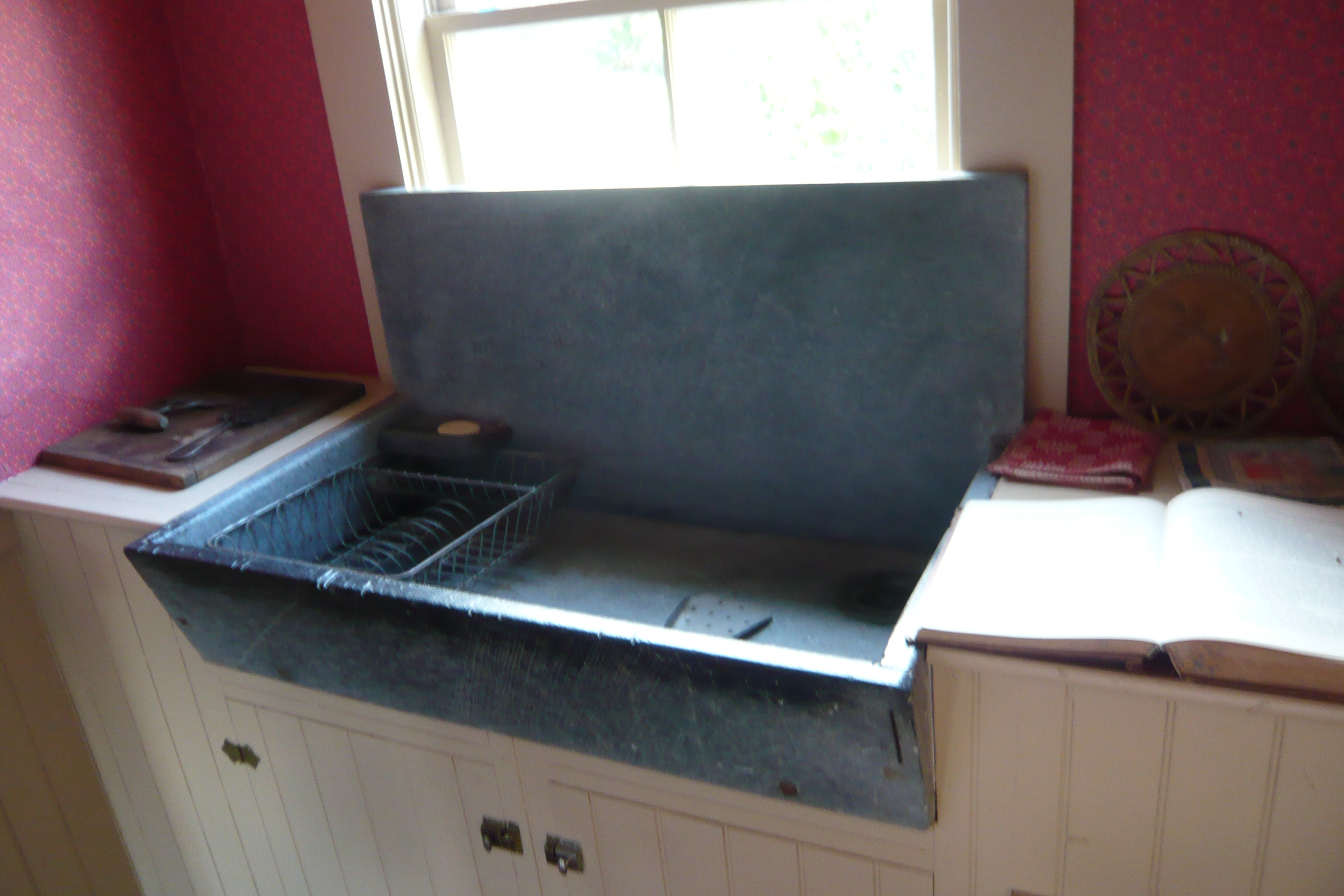
Original soapstone sink with marks where the Frost family sharpened their knives. It was found in the cellar and reinstalled in the 1980s.

== References in Robert Frost poems ==
- Frost's Poem "Mending Wall" was written about the times he spent with his neighbor, Napoleon Guay, repairing the stone wall that divided their properties. This was a yearly ritual known as "spring mending time". He wrote the poem while living in England and feeling homesick for his New England farm.
- "Hyla Brook" was written while he was still living on the farm in 1906. It is about a small brook, just south of the property.

== See also ==
- Robert Frost Farm (Ripton, Vermont)
- The Frost Place, Franconia, New Hampshire
- List of National Historic Landmarks in New Hampshire
- National Register of Historic Places listings in Rockingham County, New Hampshire
- List of residences of American writers
