= The Oxford Book of Australasian Verse =

1918 Australasian poetry collection by Oxford Uni Press

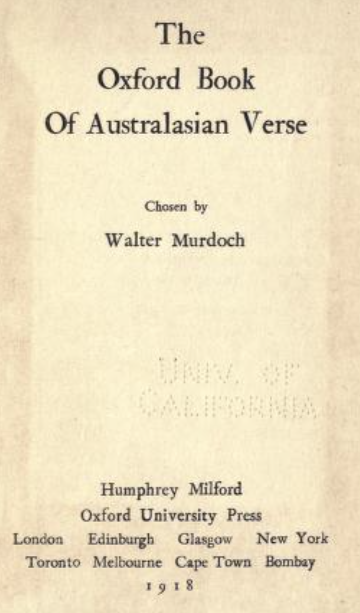
- Title page for The Oxford Book of Australasian Verse (1918)
- Editor: Walter Murdoch
- Language: English
- Publisher: Oxford University Press
- Publication date: 1918
- Publication place: U.K.
- Media type: Print (Hardback)
- Pages: 294 pp.

The Oxford Book of Australasian Verse (1918) is anthology of poems by Australian and New Zealand poets edited by Walter Murdoch. It was originally published in hardback by Oxford University Press in London in 1918.

After the original publication by Oxford University Press in 1918, the anthology was reprinted in 1924, 1945, and 1950. The contents were changed with each edition.

The anthology includes 192 poems by various authors in the 1918 edition, 186 poems in the 1924 edition, 205 poems in the 1945 edition, and 216 poems in the 1950 edition.

== Contents of the 1918 edition ==
The 1918 edition of the anthology contained the following poems:

- From : "Australasia", William Charles Wentworth
- "Weary", Henry Parkes
- "Four Score", Henry Parkes
- "Fatherland", Henry Parkes
- "The Eye of the Beholder", James L. Michael
- "Words", Charles Harpur
- "A Mid-Summer Noon in the Australian Forest", Charles Harpur
- "Andrew Marvell", Charles Harpur
- "A Similitude", Charles Harpur
- "She Loves Me Love A Confession", Charles Harpur
- "A Regret", Charles Harpur
- "The Angel of Life", Richard Rowe
- "To His Wife", Daniel Henry Deniehy
- "Morning at Sea in the Tropics", George Gordon McCrae
- "The Sick Stock-Rider", Adam Lindsay Gordon
- "Bush Delights (By Wood and Wold)", Adam Lindsay Gordon
- "A Dedication", Adam Lindsay Gordon
- "Whisperings in Wattle-Bough", Adam Lindsay Gordon
- "The Last Leap", Adam Lindsay Gordon
- "Finis Exoptatus : A Metaphysical Song", Adam Lindsay Gordon
- "Gone", Adam Lindsay Gordon
- "Bell-Birds", Henry Kendall
- "September in Australia", Henry Kendall
- "Beyond Kerguelen", Henry Kendall
- "Orara", Henry Kendall
- "Song of the Shingle Splitters", Henry Kendall
- "Mooni", Henry Kendall
- "The Mallee Fire", Charles Henry Souter
- "Sonnets - Ad Innuptam", Patrick Moloney
- "Honour", Ada Cambridge
- "Album Verses (In a Lady's Album)", Marcus Clarke
- "Travel Song", Mrs James Glenny Wilson
- "Fairyland", Mrs James Glenny Wilson
- "Hast Thou Forgotten Me?", Philip J. Holdsworth
- "Australia", John Laurence Rentoul
- From "An Austral River", John Laurence Rentoul
- "Nora", Henry Laurie
- "The Bush", James Lister Cuthbertson
- "Wattle and Myrtle", James Lister Cuthbertson
- "Corona Inutilis", James Lister Cuthbertson
- "The Symbol", James Hebblethwaite
- "Wanderers", James Hebblethwaite
- "Perdita", James Hebblethwaite
- "Rosalind", Hubert Church
- "Spring in New Zealand", Hubert Church
- "The Boundary Rider", Thomas William Heney
- "To the Poet", Thomas William Heney
- "The Earth-Mother", John Sandes
- "The Dreamers", Sydney Jephcott
- "White Paper", Sydney Jephcott
- "Twenty Gallons of Sleep", Agnes L. Storrie
- "Lights Along the Mile", Alfred Chandler
- "To M.", William Gay
- "Australia, 1894", William Gay
- "The Sonnet of Federation (Australian Federation)", William Gay
- "A Sonnet of Battle", William Gay
- "Australia Infelix", William Gay
- "The Crazy World", William Gay
- "Australia", Dowell O'Reilly
- "Stars", Dowell O'Reilly
- "Faith, Love and Death", Dowell O'Reilly
- "Sea-Grief", Dowell O'Reilly
- "Peter Simson's Farm", Edward Dyson
- "The Worked-Out Mine", Edward Dyson
- "Sweethearts", Mary Gilmore
- "Marri'd", Mary Gilmore
- "Homeward Bound", D. H. Rogers
- "To Giusue Carducci", G. W. L. Marshall-Hall
- "On Reading Shakespeare's Sonnets", G. W. L. Marshall-Hall
- "Australia", Bernard O'Dowd
- "Dawnward? : Proletaria",Danton
- "Dawnward? : Young Democracy", Danton
- "Love and Sacrifice", Bernard O'Dowd
- "The Cow", Bernard O'Dowd
- "True America's Message ('Fleet' Week, 1908)", Bernard O'Dowd
- "The Poet", Bernard O'Dowd
- "Last Stanzas of 'The Bush'", Bernard O'Dowd
- "The Magpie's Song", Frank Samuel Williamson
- "Dew", Frank Samuel Williamson
- "Dirge", Frank Samuel Williamson
- "She Comes as Comes the Summer Night", Frank Samuel Williamson
- "Thrushes", Frank Samuel Williamson
- "The Great Grey Water", E. J. Brady
- "Lost and Given Over", E. J. Brady
- "Babylon", Alfred George Stephens
- "The Camp Within the West", Roderic Quinn
- "The Circling Hearth-Fires (The Circling Hearths)", Roderic Quinn
- "Mid-Forest Fear", Roderic Quinn
- "The Hidden Tide", Roderic Quinn
- "The End of the Episode", John Philip Bourke
- "Pioneers", A. W. Jose
- "The Sum of Things", A. W. Jose
- "Freedom the Goddess", Ishmael Dare
- "Love's Palace", Arthur Maquarie
- "Britannia's Throne", Arthur Maquarie
- "Of Taking Things Easy", Arthur Maquarie
- "Of Glory", Arthur Maquarie
- "Rhapsody", Arthur Maquarie
- "The Forest of Night : 1898-1902 : The Twilight of Disquietude : 36", Christopher Brennan
- "The Forest of Night : 1898-1902 : The Twilight of Disquietude : 37", Christopher Brennan
- "O White Wind, Numbing the World (Pauca [Pavca] Mea : 101)", Christopher Brennan
- "O Said, This Misery Must End I Said This Misery Must End ((Pauca [Pavca] Mea : 103))", Christopher Brennan
- "In the Moonlight", David McKee Wright
- "The Robe of Grass", J. Le Gay Brereton
- "Buffalo Creek", J. Le Gay Brereton
- "Waking", J. Le Gay Brereton
- "Incarnation", J. Le Gay Brereton
- "Pioneers", Francis William Ophel
- "His Epitaph", Francis William Ophel
- "Love's Coming", John Shaw Neilson
- "The Meeting of Sighs", John Shaw Neilson
- "O Heart of Spring! Blossoms of Thought", John Shaw Neilson
- "The Land Where I Was Born", John Shaw Neilson
- "The Green Singer", John Shaw Neilson
- "The Break of Day", John Shaw Neilson
- "Written in Australia", Arthur H. Adams
- "The Australian", Arthur H. Adams
- "A Pair of Lovers in the Street", Arthur H. Adams
- "The Pleiades", Arthur H. Adams
- "The Weakling", Arthur H. Adams
- "Fleet Street", Arthur H. Adams
- "Ocean", Louis Lavater
- "After the Storm", Louis Lavater
- "The Sonnet", Louis Lavater
- "Courage", Louis Lavater
- "The Christ-Child Day in Australia", Ethel Turner
- "A Boat on the Sea", Ethel Turner
- "Summer", Johannes C. Andersen
- "At Evening", Dora Wilcox
- "Liebesweh", Dora Wilcox
- "Before Exile", Louise Mack
- "To Sydney", Louise Mack
- "The Skull", Mary E. Fullerton
- "Song", Robert Crawford
- "Winged Words", Robert Crawford
- "Bound for Sourabaya!", C. H. Souter
- "The Lonely Woman", Mabel Forrest
- "Ballade of Autumn", Marie E. J. Pitt
- "Hamilton", Marie E. J. Pitt
- "Evil", Marie E. J. Pitt
- "The Treasure", Dorothy Frances McCrae
- "September", Dorothy Frances McCrae
- "Homesick", Dorothy Frances McCrae
- "Grey", Archibald Strong
- "Vain Death", Archibald Strong
- "Gloriana's England", Archibald Strong
- "Hawke", Archibald Strong
- "Nelson", Archibald Strong
- "Dawn at Liverpool", Archibald Strong
- "Australia, 1902", Archibald Strong
- "Australia, 1905", Archibald Strong
- "Australia, 1914", Archibald Strong
- "Australia to England", Archibald Strong
- "The Pathfinders", Vance Palmer
- "Youth and Age", Vance Palmer
- "The Submarine", Will Lawson
- "Brogan's Lane", Louis Esson
- "Cradle Song", Louis Esson
- "The Old Black Billy an' Me", Louis Esson
- "The Shearer's Wife", Louis Esson
- "Caprice", Louis Esson
- "Never Again", Hugh McCrae
- "A Bridal Song", Hugh McCrae
- "Australian Spring", Hugh McCrae
- "Memnon", L. H. Allen
- "Unsung", Nettie Palmer
- "The Mother", Nettie Palmer
- "The Welcome", Nettie Palmer
- "Progress", Furnley Maurice
- "Edelweiss", Furnley Maurice
- "The Last Port", Furnley Maurice
- "The Suburbs", Enid Derham
- "Farewell", Enid Derham
- "O City, Look the Eastward Way", Enid Derham
- "The Mountain Road", Enid Derham
- "Love, the Wizard", Lilian Wooster Greaves
- "Bush Goblins", H. M. Green
- "A Toi", Alys Hungerford
- "A Summer Nocturne", Alys Hungerford
- "The Pool", F. S. Burnell
- "The Isle of Apple-Trees", F. S. Burnell
- "Night", H. Duncan Hall
- "My Country", Dorothea Mackellar
- "In a Southern Garden", Dorothea Mackellar
- "Oine", Roderick Kidston
- "France", S. Elliott Napier
- "Russia", S. Elliott Napier
- "All Men Are Free!", S. Elliott Napier
- "Mater Dolorosa", S. Elliott Napier
- "Song of the Foot-Track", Elsie Clarice Cole

== Critical reception of 1918 edition ==
A writer in The Sydney Morning Herald noted: "The inclusion of Australia in the 'Oxford' series is welcome, and no better editor than Professor Walter Murdoch could have been found for the Oxford Book of Australasian Verse. The name of our poets is legion, their fertility is enormous, and perhaps for that very reason Australian poetry shows to better effect in an anthology than in a library. Professor Murdoch has been wide in his range and judicious in his choice...Professor Murdoch is as discriminating in his selection from those whose names are household words with us. But this anthology has one disability which, though he is not responsible for it, prevents it from being wholly representative of Australian poetry. The 'inexorable necessities of copyright' have compelled him to omit many flowers from his garland. An anthology which contains nothing of the work of Daley, Brunton Stephens, Essex Evans, John Farrell, Barcroft Boake, Major Paterson, Mr. Henry Lawson, Mr. W. M. Ogilvie, and Miss Zora Cross, to name only a few, does not give to the world the best fruits of Australian poetry."

In The Argus, from Melbourne, a reviewer stated: "Those who have an intimate knowledge of Australian verse will as he expects miss some poems and wonder why others were included but many beautiful things will be found and for its purpose of making Australian verse better known in Great Britain the book deserves the success which it is likely to find."

== Contents of the 1924 edition ==
The 1924 edition of the anthology contained all of the poems in the 1918 edition with the following additions and deletions.

=== Poems added to the 1924 edition ===
- "A Song of Autumn", Adam Lindsay Gordon
- "The Dominion", J. Brunton Stephens
- “Pax Vobiscum”, Thomas Bracken
- "Clancy of the Overflow", A. B. Paterson
- "On Kiley's Run", A. B. Paterson
- "A Bushman's Song", A. B. Paterson
- "The Sliprails and the Spur", Henry Lawson
- "The Great Grey Plain", Henry Lawson
- "The Teams", Henry Lawson
- "The Super-Lark", R. H. Long
- "City of God", R. H. Long
- "The Skylark's Nest", R. H. Long
- "Drought", Will H. Ogilvie
- "From the Gulf", Will H. Ogilvie
- "The Dead", J. Le Gay Brereton
- "Where the Dead Men Lie", Barcroft Boake
- "Roses and Rain", Archibald Strong
- "Oxford", Archibald Strong
- "When I was Six", Zora Cross
- "Witchcraft", Zora Cross
- "To God: From the Warring Nations", Furnley Maurice
- "The Open Sea", Dorothea Mackellar
- "The Husband", Leon Gellert
- "The Cross", Leon Gellert
- "Through a Porthole", Leon Gellert
- "For England", J. D. Burns

=== Poems not included in the 1924 edition ===
- "Four Score", Henry Parkes
- "Fatherland", Henry Parkes
- "A Mid-Summer Noon in the Australian Forest", Charles Harpur
- "Andrew Marvell", Charles Harpur
- "A Regret", Charles Harpur
- "Morning at Sea in the Tropics", George Gordon McCrae
- "Finis Exoptatus : A Metaphysical Song", Adam Lindsay Gordon
- "Song of the Shingle Splitters", Henry Kendall
- "The Mallee Fire", Charles Henry Souter
- "Hast Thou Forgotten Me?", Philip J. Holdsworth
- From "An Austral River", John Laurence Rentoul
- "Nora", Henry Laurie
- "To Giusue Carducci", G. W. L. Marshall-Hall
- "On Reading Shakespeare's Sonnets", G. W. L. Marshall-Hall
- "Thrushes", Frank Samuel Williamson
- "The End of the Episode", John Philip Bourke
- "Britannia's Throne", Arthur Maquarie
- "Rhapsody", Arthur Maquarie
- "Incarnation", J. Le Gay Brereton
- "After the Storm", Louis Lavater
- "The Sonnet", Louis Lavater
- "The Skull", Mary E. Fullerton
- "Ballade of Autumn", Marie E. J. Pitt
- "Hamilton", Marie E. J. Pitt
- "Evil", Marie E. J. Pitt
- "Vain Death", Archibald Strong
- "The Submarine", Will Lawson
- "Caprice", Louis Esson
- "Australian Spring", Hugh McCrae
- "Progress", Furnley Maurice
- "Edelweiss", Furnley Maurice
- "The Last Port", Furnley Maurice
- "Love, the Wizard", Lilian Wooster Greaves

== Note ==
- You can read a digitised version of the 1918 edition of this book at the Open Library.

== See also ==
- 1918 in poetry
- 1918 in Australian literature
- New Oxford Book of Australian Verse
