= Bards in the Wilderness : Australian Colonial Poetry to 1920 =

1970 Australian poetry anthology

- Editor: Adrian Mitchell and Brian Elliott
- Language: English
- Genre: Poetry anthology
- Publisher: Nelson
- Publication date: 1970
- Publication place: Australia
- Media type: Print
- Pages: 280 pp
- ISBN: 9780170048279

Bards in the Wilderness : Australian Colonial Poetry to 1920 is an anthology of Australian poems edited by Adrian Mitchell and Brian Elliott, published by Nelson in 1970.

The anthology contains 218 poems from a variety of authors.

== Contents ==
- "Sydney Cove A Fulfilled Prophecy Visit of Hope to Sydney Cove", Erasmus Darwin
- "Botany Bay Ecologues : Elinor", Robert Southey
- "Prologue: By a Gentleman of Leicester. On opening the Theater, at Sydney, Botany Bay to be spoken by the celebrated Mr Barrington", Henry Carter
- "Verses Written to Lewin, the Entomologist, 1805", John Grant
- "Alas; Poor Botany Bay", Anonymous
- "Colonial Hunt", Anonymous
- "Ode for the Queen's Birth-Day, 1813", Michael Massey Robinson
- "Ode for the Queen's Birth Day, 1816", Michael Massey Robinson
- "Botany-Bay Flowers", Barron Field
- "Kangaroo", Barron Field
- "On Reading the Controversy Between Lord Byron and Mr Bowles", Barron Field
- "'Where'er the Sickning Muse'", William Charles Wentworth
- "Impromptu", William Charles Wentworth
- "A Friendly Hint: A Fragment", William Charles Wentworth
- "Ode V. to Sylvia", Charles Tompson
- "Black Town", Charles Tompson
- "Elegiac Lines on Winter", 'Australasianus'
- "Colonial Nomenclature", John Dunmore Lang
- "Judge Field a Poet, and 'Botany Bay Flowers'", John Dunmore Lang
- "Sonnet Written on Board the Medway, off Hobart Town", John Dunmore Lang
- "D'Entrecasteaux' Channel, Van Dieman's Land", John Dunmore Lang
- "Sonnet : On the Conflagration of the Forest Around Sydney November 25th, 1826", John Dunmore Lang
- "The Country", William Woolls
- "My Native Land", Henry Parkes
- "The Cry of "Land!"", A Wanderer
- "The Home-Bound Ship", Henry Parkes
- "Our Coming Countrymen", Henry Parkes
- "Solitude", A Wanderer
- "Is Wentworth a Patriot?", An Australian
- "Sonnet Dedicated to Sir George Gipps", Charles Harpur
- "On Seeing Her Dressed in White", Charles Harpur
- "She Loves Me Love A Confession", Charles Harpur
- "Prose Poetry", Charles Harpur
- "Coleridge's Christabel", Charles Harpur
- "The Creek of the Four Graves", Charles Harpur
- "To the Daisy", Charles Harpur
- "Tullamarine", Richard Howitt
- "Amans Amare", Daniel Henry Deniehy
- "To Mrs. Chisholm", Robert Lowe
- "Songs of the Squatters (No.3.)", Robert Lowe
- "Two Satires on the Gladstone Colony : 1 (North Australia : [In Rhyme])", Robert Lowe
- "Two Satires on the Gladstone Colony : 2 (Inscription on the Monument Proposed To Be Erected on the Spot Where Colonel * "Barney Landed at Port Curtis)", Robert Lowe
- From : "The Genius and the Ghost", William Forster
- "Shadows of Death", Caroline W. Leakey
- "English Wild Flowers", Caroline W. Leakey
- "To Ireland", Roderick J. Flanagan
- "Memory", James L. Michael
- From 'John Cumberland'", James L. Michael
- "Glaucus", 'Peter Possum'
- "Let Us Be Merry : Just To-Night", 'Peter Possum'
- "The Song of Australia", Caroline Carleton
- "Australian Explorers", R. H. Horne
- "The Glen of Arrawatta", Henry Kendall
- "Prefatory Sonnets : I", Henry Kendall
- "Prefatory Sonnets : II", Henry Kendall
- "Bell-Birds", Henry Kendall
- "Orara", Henry Kendall
- "The Song of Ninian Melville", Henry Kendall
- "A Dedication", Adam Lindsay Gordon
- "The Sick Stockrider", Adam Lindsay Gordon
- "Visions in the Smoke", Adam Lindsay Gordon
- "Evening: A Fragment", Emma Frances Anderson
- "In a Bush Hut", George Gordon McCrae
- "The Silence of the Bush", G. G. McC
- "Life's a Cigar", George Gordon McCrae
- "The Dominion", J. Brunton Stephens
- "Quart Pot Creek", J. Brunton Stephens
- "Practising the Anthem", Ada Cambridge
- "Fallen", Ada Cambridge
- "Adam Lindsay Gordon", Margaret Thomas
- "Death in the Bush", Margaret Thomas
- "From the Clyde to Braidwood", Australie
- "Two Sonnets to Henry George", John Farrell
- "Three Sonnets about New Zealand Matters", Henry Halloran
- "In Memoriam on the Death of His Royal Highness Prince Leopold, Duke of Albany", Henry Halloran
- "Sonnets - Ad Innuptam", Patrick Moloney
- "Autumn in New South Wales", Douglas Sladen
- "Govett's Leap", Douglas Sladen
- "Night", Francis Adams
- "Where the Pelican Builds", Mary Hannay Foott
- "In Time of Drought", Mary Hannay Foott
- "At the Valley of the Popran: Hawkesbury River", Philip J. Holdsworth
- "Salut a l'Homme - Walt Whitman", Thomas William Heney
- "The Flower Everlasting", Thomas William Heney
- "An Australian Symphony", George Essex Evans
- "The Women of the West", George Essex Evans
- "The Two Goblets", George Essex Evans
- "In the Morning", Sydney Jephcott
- "A Moonlit Gorge", Sydney Jephcott
- "December Drowsiness", Sydney Jephcott
- "Sapless Spring", Sydney Jephcott
- "The Bush", James Lister Cuthbertson
- "Australia Infelix", William Gay
- "Australian Federation", William Gay
- "Primroses", William Gay
- "The Teams", Henry Lawson
- "It is Not There", Henry Lawson
- "Song of the Future", A. B. Paterson
- "In the Desert", Dramingo
- "Daybreak in the Desert", Ernest Favenc
- "Shoreless Sea", J. Le Gay Brereton
- "The Presence of the Bush", J. Le Gay Brereton
- "The Fair Enemy", James Hebblethwaite
- "The Embarcation for Cythera", James Hebblethwaite
- "The Jo-Wickee", James Hebblethwaite
- "The Bush", James Hebblethwaite
- "Plains : Near Hay, New South Wales", Arthur A. D. Bayldon
- "A Swamp", Arthur A. D. Bayldon
- "Victoria Regina: 22 January 1901", Arthur A. D. Bayldon
- "A Vision Out West", Barcroft Boake
- "Towards the Source : 1894-97 : 2", Christopher Brennan
- "Towards the Source : 1894-97 : 3", Christopher Brennan
- "Towards the Source : 1894-97 : 4", Christopher Brennan
- "Towards the Source : 1894-97 : 5", Christopher Brennan
- "Towards the Source : 1894-97 : 6", Christopher Brennan
- "Towards the Source : 1894-97 : 8", Christopher Brennan
- "Towards the Source : 1894-97 : 7", Christopher Brennan
- "Towards the Source : 1894-97 : 9", Christopher Brennan
- "Towards the Source : 1894-97 : I : 10", Christopher Brennan
- "Towards the Source : 1894-97 : II : 11", Christopher Brennan
- "Towards the Source : 1894-97 : III : 12", Christopher Brennan
- "Towards the Source : 1894-97 : 13", Christopher Brennan
- "Towards the Source : 1894-97 : 14", Christopher Brennan
- "Towards the Source : 1894-97 : 15", Christopher Brennan
- "Towards the Source : 1894-97 : 16", Christopher Brennan
- "Towards the Source : 1894-97 : 17", Christopher Brennan
- "Towards the Source : 1894-97 : 18", Christopher Brennan
- "Towards the Source : 1894-97 : 19", Christopher Brennan
- "Towards the Source : 1894-97 : 20", Christopher Brennan
- "Towards the Source : 1894-97 : 21", Christopher Brennan
- "Towards the Source : 1894-97 : 22", Christopher Brennan
- "Towards the Source : 1894-97 : 23", Christopher Brennan
- "Towards the Source : 1894-97 : 24", Christopher Brennan
- "Towards the Source : 1894-97 : 25", Christopher Brennan
- "Towards the Source : 1894-97 : 26", Christopher Brennan
- "Towards the Source : 1894-97 : 27", Christopher Brennan
- "Towards the Source : 1894-97 : 28", Christopher Brennan
- "Towards the Source : 1894-97 : 29", Christopher Brennan
- "Towards the Source : 1894-97 : 30", Christopher Brennan
- "Epilogues : 1908", Christopher Brennan
- "The Call of the City", Victor J. Daley
- "St Francis II", Victor J. Daley
- "Villanelle", Victor J. Daley
- "Lachesis", Victor J. Daley
- "Correggio Jones", Victor J. Daley
- "Written in Australia", Arthur H. Adams
- "Sydney", Arthur H. Adams
- "The Australian", Arthur H. Adams
- "The Fisher", Roderic Quinn
- "The Surrender", Roderic Quinn
- "Noon on the Barrier Ranges", Roderic Quinn
- "The Farewell", Alfred George Stephens
- "Parkes", Alfred George Stephens
- "Brahm", Joseph Furphy
- "Australia", Bernard O'Dowd
- "Mystery", Bernard O'Dowd
- "Pride", Bernard O'Dowd
- "The Cow", Bernard O'Dowd
- "The Poet", Bernard O'Dowd
- "Cleombrotus", Henry Arthur
- "Australia, 1902", Archibald Strong
- "Australia, 1905", Archibald Strong
- "Australia, 1914", Archibald Strong
- "Ballade of Leading Cases", Archibald Strong
- "To God: From the Warring Nations", Furnley Maurice
- "Death and Nature", Frederic Manning
- "The Trenches", Frederic Manning
- "A Shell", Frederic Manning
- "Leaves", Frederic Manning
- "Grotesque", Frederic Manning
- "A Wreath", William Baylebridge
- "Crows", E.
- "The Selector's Wife", Mary E. Fullerton
- "Robber and Drone and I", Mary E. Fullerton
- "The Slaughterman's Child", Mary E. Fullerton
- "The Singers", David McKee Wright
- "Hellas", David McKee Wright
- "On a Shining Silver Morning", David McKee Wright
- "Sad Memories", Hugh McCrae
- "The Mouse", Hugh McCrae
- "Fantasy", Hugh McCrae
- "Ambuscade", Hugh McCrae
- "Hugh McCrae", Lionel Lindsay
- "Magpies", Louis Esson
- "Nomad Chant (To E.J. Brady)", Louis Esson
- "These Fellowing Men", Mary Gilmore
- "Of Old Men", Mary Gilmore
- "Nostalgic", Mary Gilmore
- "She Will Follow and Go", Mary Gilmore
- "By the Glenelg", Mary Gilmore
- "Remembrance", Mary Gilmore
- "My Country", Dorothea Mackellar
- "Two Japanese Songs : 2 : A Smoke Song", Dorothea Mackellar
- "Seagull", Dorothea Mackellar
- "Love-Pyre", Frederick T. Macartney
- "An Outer Suburb : Sunday", Frederick T. Macartney
- "Sonnet", Frederick T. Macartney
- "Wattle Grove", Nettie Palmer
- "Exiles", Frank Samuel Williamson
- "The Barrack Yard", Nettie Palmer
- "Love Sonnets : XVII", Zora Cross
- "There Is a Football Match", Zora Cross
- "Song Be Delicate", John Shaw Neilson
- "To a Blue Flower", John Shaw Neilson
- "Bush Scene", John Shaw Neilson
- "At a Lowan's Nest", John Shaw Neilson
- "The Break of Day", John Shaw Neilson
- "The Voice in the Coffin", John Shaw Neilson
- "A Night Attack", Leon Gellert
- "A Song", Leon Gellert
- "In the Trench", Leon Gellert
- "These Men", Leon Gellert
- "House-Mates", Leon Gellert
- "The Noon God", Leon Gellert
- "Homecoming", Vance Palmer
- "These Are My People", Vance Palmer
- "The Farmer Remembers the Somme", Vance Palmer
- "Europe", Vance Palmer

== Critical reception ==
In his review of the anthology for Hemisphere magazine literary critic Clement Semmler noted that the editors confined their selections to works published prior to 1920 because "the editors see 1920 as a point where a new phase in Australian poetry began and the colonial habit of thought came fairly well to an end." He went on to comment that the volume "is as instructive as it is entertaining, and altogether wholly rewarding".

The Oxford Companion to Australian Literature states: "The wide-ranging selection begins with Aboriginal poetry, extracts from English poets writing about the distant colony and anonymous early balladry, and includes not only the major colonial poets but also lesser-known figures."

== See also ==
- 1970 in Australian literature
