= 1914 in Australian literature =

This article presents a list of the historical events and publications of Australian literature during 1914.

== Novels ==
- Mary Grant Bruce — Gray's Hollow
- Ada Cambridge — The Making of Rachel Rowe
- Edward Dyson — Loves of Lancelot
- Mabel Forrest — A Bachelor's Wife
- Louise Mack — The House of Daffodils
- Dorothea Mackellar & Ruth M. Bedford — Two's Company
- Ambrose Pratt
  - Her Assigned Husband
  - War in the Pacific
- Lilian Turner — The Girl from the Back-Blocks
- E. L. Grant Watson — Where Bonds are Loosed

== Short stories ==
- Robert Brothers — "Wharf Labourers"
- Edward Dyson — Spat's Fact'ry: More Fact'ry 'Ands
- Will H. Ogilvie — The Honour of the Station

== Poetry ==
- Emily Coungeau — Stella Australis: Poems and Verses and Prose Fragments
- James Lister Cuthbertson — "The Bush"
- C. J. Dennis
  - "Mar"
  - "The Play"
- Mabel Forrest — "The Heroes"
- Henry Lawson
  - "Dawgs of War"
  - "A Fantasy of War"
- Will Lawson — The Three Kings and Other Verses
- Dorothy Frances McCrae — Soldier, My Soldier!
- Hugh McCrae — "June Morning"
- Dorothea Mackellar — The Witch-Maid and Other Verses
- John Shaw Neilson
  - "The Eyes of Little Charlotte"
  - "O Lady of the Dazzling Flowers"
- A. B. Paterson
  - "The Road to Hogan's Gap"
  - "Song of the Wheat"
  - "Sunrise on the Coast"

== Births ==
A list, ordered by date of birth (and, if the date is either unspecified or repeated, ordered alphabetically by surname) of births in 1914 of Australian literary figures, authors of written works or literature-related individuals follows, including year of death.

- 6 February — Donald Friend, artist and diarist (died 1989)
- 23 February – Pat Flower, playwright, television scriptwriter and crime novelist (died 1977)
- 27 October — Margaret Trist, novelist and short story writer (died 1986)
- 4 November — Peter Cowan, novelist (died 2002)
- 1 December — David McNicoll, poet (died 2000)
- 23 December — Clement Semmler, critic (died 2000)

== Deaths ==
A list, ordered by date of death (and, if the date is either unspecified or repeated, ordered alphabetically by surname) of deaths in 1914 of Australian literary figures, authors of written works or literature-related individuals follows, including year of birth.

- 13 January — John Philip Bourke, poet (born 1860)

== See also ==
- 1914 in Australia
- 1914 in literature
- 1914 in poetry
- List of years in Australian literature
- List of years in literature
