= Frank Fowler (writer) =

- Born: Francis Edmund Town Fowler; 1833; London, England
- Died: 1863 (aged 29–30); Kensington, London, England
- Occupations: Author, Journalist

Francis Edmund Town Fowler (1833 – 22 August 1863) was a British-born author and journalist who later played a significant role in the early development of Australia's literary culture. He is best known for his book Southern Lights and Shadows (London, 1859), and for founding and editing Australia's first literary journal, The Month.

== Background and career ==
Frank Fowler was born in London to a publishing family. He worked as a journalist for The Times and reported for two sessions in the House of Commons. In 1855-57 he visited New South Wales and joined the staff of the Sydney Empire and also wrote for the Sydney Morning Herald. He co-founded and edited Australia's first literary journal, The Month, and regularly addressed the Sydney Mechanics' School of Arts on poetry, theatre, literature, politics and the importance of developing a uniquely Australian culture. His lectures were published as Texts for Talkers (London, 1860). He wrote the preface to Australian Musical Album (Sydney, 1857), and reviewed various performers, including the visiting French baritone Emile Coulon. Fowler also wrote a play, 'Eva', which was performed in Sydney in 1856.

Frank Fowler was a member of the Stenhouse Circle, a close-knit group of colonial writers and intellectuals in the 1850s and 1860s, which included Nicol Drysdale Stenhouse, Richard Rowe, Charles Harpur, Henry Kendall, Joseph Moore, James Lionel Michael, Henry Halloran, William Bede Dalley, professors John Woolley and Charles Badham, and Sir Henry Parkes, the ‘Father of the Australian Federation’. Fowler clashed with Parkes following his critical review of Parkes's poem "Stolen Moments" (1842).

In January 1858 Fowler contested the Sydney City seat in the New South Wales Legislative Assembly, with the support of N. D. Stenhouse, Joseph Sheridan Moore, newspaper proprietor John Fairfax, and shipowner Edye Manning. However, his candidature was unsuccessful.

In April 1858 Fowler returned to England with his wife Rachel, née Clarke, whom he had married at a Congregational Church in Sydney on 9 February 1856, and their infant son. He was sent off with a testimonial. He wrote his first major work Southern Lights and Shadows (London, 1859) on the voyage He became editor of the Weekly Mail, leader-writer on The Standard and contributed occasionally to the Empire. He published in London The Wreck of the 'Royal Charter' (1859)Dottings of a Lounger (1859) and, as Harpur Atherton, Adrift or, the Rock in the South Atlantic (1861). He founded the London Library Co. and was its first secretary. As it began to flourish he died aged 30 from brain fever on 22 August 1863 at Kensington. His widow and children returned to Sydney. In 1864, a collection of his works with a brief biography, was published called Last Gleanings.

The Oxford Companion to Australian Literature notes that 'Fowler contributed significantly to literary, political and social discussion of the contemporary colonial scene.'

== Publications ==
- Southern Lights and Shadows (London, 1859)
- The Wreck of the 'Royal Charter' (London, 1859)
- Dottings of a Lounger (1859)
- Texts for Talkers (London, 1860)
- Adrift: or, the Rock in the South Atlantic (1861)
