= A Mid-Summer Noon in the Australian Forest =

1851 poem by Charles Harpur

- by Charles Harpur
- First published in: The Empire
- Country: Australia
- Language: English
- Publication date: 27 May 1851

Full text
- A Mid-Summer Noon in the Australian Forest at Wikisource

A Mid-Summer Noon in the Australian Forest is a poem by Australian poet Charles Harpur. It was first published in The Empire magazine on 27 May 1851 under the title "Noon in the Forest at Midsummer", and later in the poet's collection titled Poems (1883).

== Analysis ==
The Oxford Companion to Australian Literature calls this Harpur's "best-known and most-anthologised descriptive poem." However they then go on to say that "Although often praised for its creation of the hushed somnolent atmosphere of the summer noonday in the Australian bush, the poem lacks Australian definition."

eNotes.com states that the Harpur's poem "reflects the influence of Wordsworth, but also the independent, inventive spirit that would characterize most of his works."

Michael Griffith, in discussing early Australian colonial poetry says that Harpur "manages to capture the magic of stillness, along with the miraculous impressions of the life of nature. He presents, powerfully his awe and wonder at the miracle of the Australian bush. Few Australian poets, even today, have his grasp of the way sound and sense can come so closely together."

== Further publications ==
- The Oxford Book of Australasian Verse edited by Walter Murdoch (1918)
- An Australasian Anthology : Australian and New Zealand Poems edited by Percival Serle, R. H. Croll, and Frank Wilmot (1927)
- A Book of Australian Verse edited by Judith Wright (1956)
- From the Ballads to Brennan edited by T. Inglis Moore, Angus & Robertson, 1964
- Songs for All Seasons : 100 Poems for Young People edited by Rosemary Dobson (1967)
- Silence into Song : An Anthology of Australian Verse edited by Clifford O'Brien (1968)
- The Penguin Book of Australian Verse edited by Harry Payne Heseltine (1972)
- Australia Fair : Poems and Paintings edited by Douglas Stewart (1974)
- A Treasury of Colonial Poetry (1982)
- The Illustrated Treasury of Australian Verse edited by Beatrice Davis (1984)
- Cross-Country : A Book of Australian Verse edited by John Barnes and Brian MacFarlane, Heinemann, 1988
- A Treasury of Bush Verse edited by G. A. Wilkes, Angus and Robertson, 1991
- An Anthology of Australian Poetry to 1920 edited by John Kinsella (2007)
- Australian Poetry Since 1788 edited by Geoffrey Lehmann and Robert Gray (2011)

== See also ==
- 1851 in poetry
- 1851 in literature
- Australian literature
