= Dorothy Frances McCrae =

Australian poet (1879–1937)

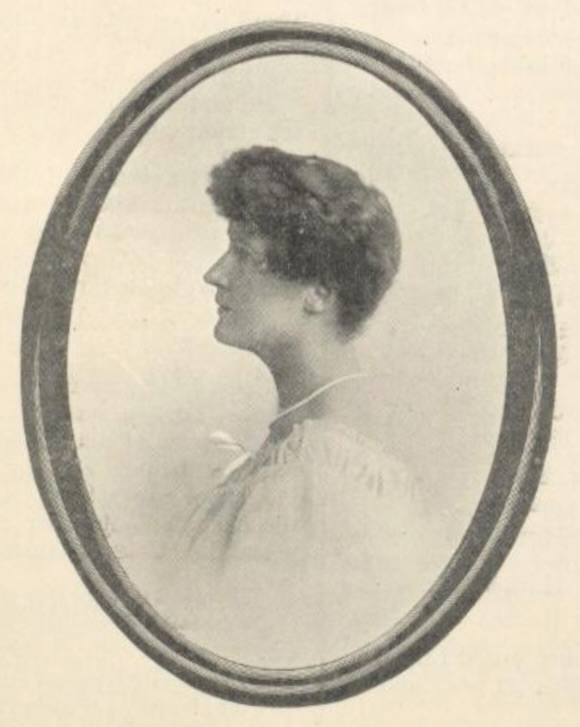
- Dorothy Frances McCrae in 1907
- Born: 1879
- Died: 9 April 1937 (aged 57–58)
- Occupation: Poet, short story writer
- Period: 1901–1930
- Relatives: George Gordon McCrae (father); Hugh McCrae (brother); Georgiana McCrae (grandmother)

Dorothy Frances McCrae (1879 – 9 April 1937) was an Australian poet and short story writer. She is best known for her collection of war poetry, Soldier, My Soldier!

== Early life ==
Dorothy Frances McCrae was born in 1879 in Hawthorn, Victoria. She was fourth of six children of Augusta Helen (née Brown) and well-known poet George Gordon McCrae. An older brother, Hugh McCrae, was also a poet, while her paternal grandmother, Georgiana McCrae, was a painter and diarist.

== Career ==
Using the pseudonym The Young 'Un, McCrae's poems first appeared in The Bulletin in 1901. She contributed poetry and short stories to The Bulletin under her own name from 1904 to 1927. Her poems and stories were also published in The Australasian and The Bookfellow.

Soldier, My Soldier! was published in 1914 and dedicated to her brother, Geoffrey Gordon McCrae, who was killed in July 1916 during the Battle of Fromelles. The Triad found it "a little book of war-songs very strong and sane, very true and tender".

Her second collection of war poetry, The Clear Call, was dedicated "To the mothers of our soldiers". The Bulletin found it "disappointing", while The Triad critic wrote "The stuff is poor, the note is forced, the music is—Alas! there is no music."

Three of her poems—"The Treasure", "September" and "Homesick"—were included in The Oxford Book of Australasian Verse (1918).

A portrait of McCrae drawn by Elizabeth Wallwork in 1929 is held in the State Library of Victoria.

== Publications ==
- McCrae, Dorothy Frances (1909). Lyrics in leisure. T.C. Lothian.
- ——— (1910). Some childrens' songs. Marion Alsop (composer); Edith Alsop (designer). G. Robertson & Co.
- ——— (1914). Soldier, my soldier. George Robertson & Co.
- ——— (1915). The clear call. George Robertson & Co.
- ——— (1926). Caedmon's gift and other verses. Edward A. Vidler.

== Personal and death ==
McCrae married Reverend Charles Elliott Perry on 6 April 1907 at Christ Church in Hawthorn. The ceremony was conducted by the archbishop of Melbourne. The couple spent their honeymoon in England.

In 1916, the Perrys moved to Christchurch, New Zealand where Charles served as vicar of St. Michael's until his retirement in 1936, when they returned to Sydney. Charles died at North Sydney on 8 January 1937.

McCrae died at her home in North Sydney on 9 April 1937. The inquest found that the cause of death was suicide by drowning in the bath.
