= Herbert Strong (philologist) =

Australian scholar, professor of comparative philology and logic

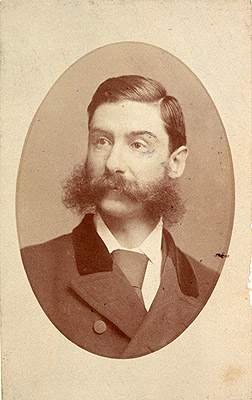
Herbert Augustus Strong

Herbert Augustus Strong (24 November 1841 – 13 January 1918) was an Australian scholar, professor of comparative philology and logic at the University of Melbourne.

== Early life ==
Strong was born at Clyst St Mary near Exeter, England the third son of Rev. Edmond Strong and his wife Sarah, née Forbes-Coulson.

Strong was educated at Winchester School and Corpus Christi College, Oxford, graduating B.A. in 1863. From 1866 to 1871 Strong was assistant to professor of humanity, George Ramsay, at the University of Glasgow, and was the first warden of University Hall, University of Glasgow.

== Career in Australia ==
In 1872, Strong was appointed professor of classical and comparative philology and logic at the University of Melbourne, replacing Martin Howy Irving. Strong's opportunities were not great as the university was still young, there being then four other professors and fewer than 150 full-time students; ten years later the students still numbered under 300.

== Liverpool ==
In 1884 Strong became professor of Latin at the newly founded University College in Liverpool and held the chair until his retirement in 1909. He wrote the words to the song 'Salvete Cives Nostri' composed by Albert Lister Peace, this song was performed at the Opening Ceremony of the Victoria Building in 1892 and was known as the University College song. Strong was married twice: to Helen Campbell Edmiston and Isobel, née White. Strong was survived by two sons, one of who was Sir Archibald Strong.
