= Song of the Shingle Splitters =

Poem by Australian writer Henry Kendall

- by Henry Kendall
- Written: 1874
- First published in: The Australian Town and Country Journal
- Country: Australia
- Language: English

Full text
- Song of the Shingle Splitters at Wikisource

"Song of the Shingle Splitters" (1874) is a poem by Australian poet Henry Kendall.

The poem was originally published in The Australian Town and Country Journal on 2 May 1874 and subsequently reprinted in a number of Australian newspapers and magazines, as well as poetry anthologies.

== Critical reception ==
In his literary study of Kendall and his work, Thomas Thornton Reed noted: "His love of description led him to overlay his ballads, as he overlaid his narrative blank verse, with an ornateness which changes them into something which is neither ballad nor lyric." He went on to explain that "'Song of the Shingle Splitters' is the best that Kendall achieved in his peculiar style."

== Publication history ==
After the poem's initial publication in The Australian Town and Country Journal it was reprinted as follows:

- The Oxford Book of Australasian Verse edited by Walter Murdoch, Oxford University Press, 1918
- Australian Bush Songs and Ballads edited by Will Lawson, Frank Johnson, 1944
- Selected Poems of Henry Kendall edited by T. Inglis Moore, Angus and Robertson, 1957
- Our Country : Classic Australian Poetry : From Colonial Ballads to Paterson & Lawson edited by Michael Cook, Little Hills Press, 2002

== See also ==
- 1874 in Australian literature
- 1874 in poetry
