= William Spalding (writer) =

Scottish writer and academic

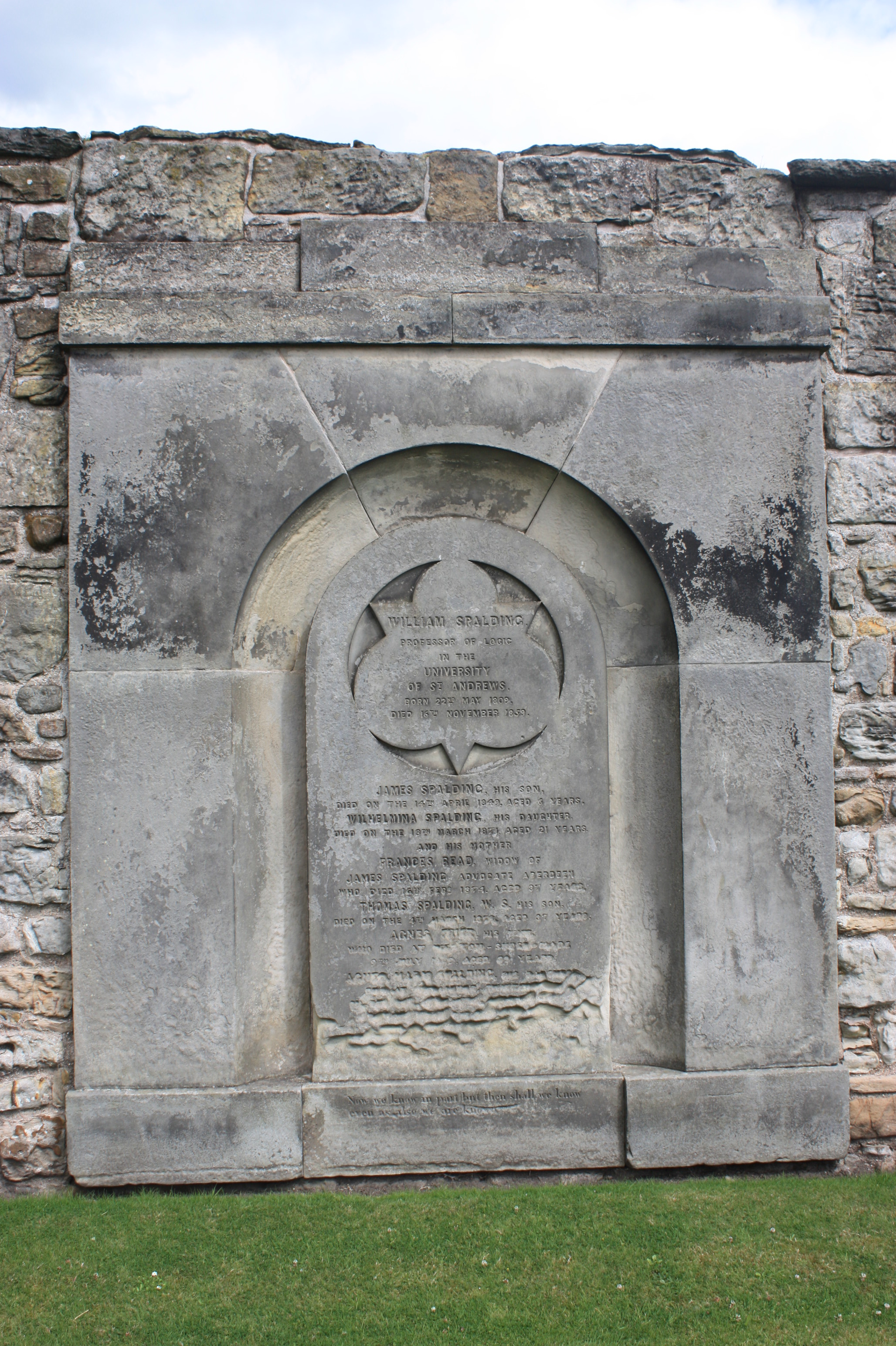
The grave of Prof William Spalding, St Andrews Cathedral churchyard

William Spalding (22 May 1809 – 16 November 1859) was a Scottish writer and academic. For the last twenty years of his life he served as professor of rhetoric and logic, in addition to authoring essays, reviews and historical texts.

== Life ==
Born in Aberdeen, to advocate James Spalding and his wife, Frances Read, young William was educated in the city's grammar school and at Marischal College. Moving to Edinburgh in 1830, he read law and was called to the bar in 1833. In that year he published a Letter on Shakespeare's Authorship of the Two Noble Kinsmen (reprinted for the New Shakspere Society in 1876, seventeen years after his death), which attracted the notice of leading literary critic Francis Jeffrey, who invited Spalding to contribute to the Edinburgh Review. Having devoted much time to studying Shakespeare and other Elizabethan dramatists, he continued to write on these topics for the Review. His other writings included contributions to Blackwood's Magazine and the eighth edition (1853–60) of the Encyclopædia Britannica, which contains his biographical entries on Joseph Addison, Francis Bacon, Demosthenes, Sir Walter Scott and Torquato Tasso as well as articles on fable, fallacy, logic, rhetoric and slavery. He also authored a concise History of English Literature, published in 1853.

He also spent time in Italy and published, in 1841, Italy and the Italian Islands from the Earliest Ages to the Present Time. At the start of his career as educator, he occupied the chair of rhetoric and belles lettres at the University of Edinburgh from 1840 to 1845, when he was appointed professor of logic, rhetoric and metaphysics at the University of St Andrews, and remained in the post until his death.

William Spalding died in St Andrews less than six months after his fiftieth birthday. He is buried against the north wall of the churchyard of St Andrew's Cathedral.

He had been married to Agnes Frier since 22 March 1838 and they were the parents of a daughter, Mary Frances. In Australia, on 11 January 1871, Mary Frances married Scottish journalist, philosopher and academic Henry Laurie who moved to Melbourne in 1864 and, lecturing at the University of Melbourne became, in 1886, the first professor of mental and moral philosophy in Australia, receiving, that year, an honorary LL.D. from St Andrews. Henry Laurie and his wife had three sons.
