= The Bookman (London) =

British periodical, 1891–1934

The Bookman was a monthly magazine published in London from 1891 until 1934 by Hodder & Stoughton. It was a catalogue of the current publications that also contained reviews, advertising and illustrations. William Robertson Nicoll, Arthur St. John Adcock and Hugh Ross Williamson were editors. Contributors included G. K. Chesterton, Walter Pater, Gertrude Atherton, Guy Thorne, J. M. Barrie, Edward Thomas, W. B. Yeats, Arthur Ransome, M.R. James, Lilian Wooster Greaves and Samuel Beckett.

== See also ==
- The Bookman (New York City)
