= Enid Derham =

Australian poet and academic (1882–1941)

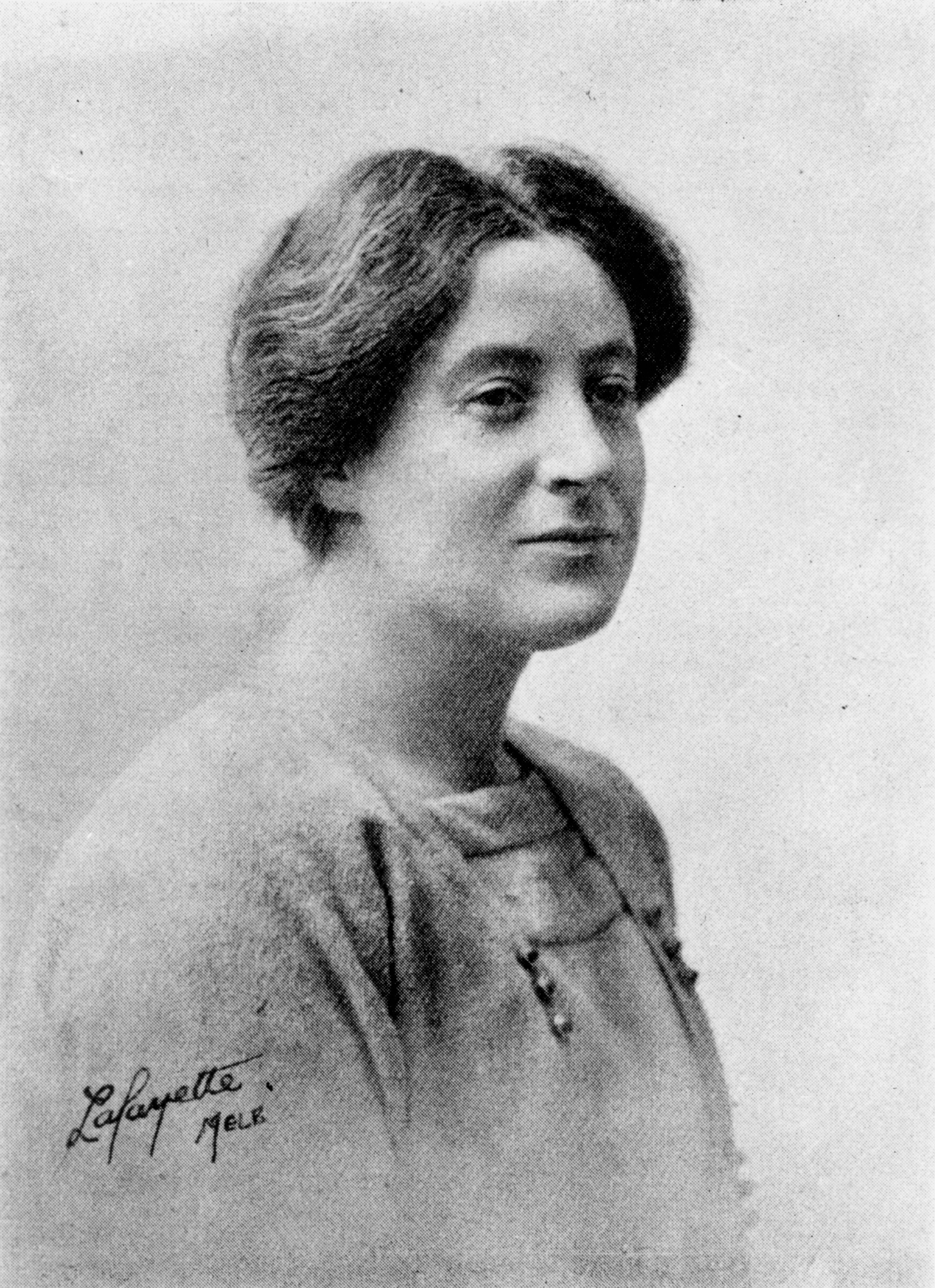
- Born: 24 March 1882; Hawthorn, Victoria, Australia
- Died: 13 November 1941 (aged 59); Kew, Victoria, Australia
- Education: Hessle College, Camberwell; Presbyterian Ladies' College, Melbourne; University of Melbourne; Oxford University
- Occupations: Poet; Academic
- Known for: Founding member of the Lyceum Club

Enid Derham (24 March 1882 – 13 November 1941) was an Australian poet and academic. She was a founding member of the Lyceum Club, and was president in 1918. She lectured in English at the University of Western Australia, and then took position of senior lecturer in English at the University of Melbourne.

== Career ==
She edited books of prose, poetry and drama. In a review for The Herald, scholar Archibald Strong compared Derham's work favourably with that of Louis Esson, Dorothea Mackellar and Christopher Brennan. He wrote of the "true and original singing quality and its scholarly and critical finish" as being rare in Australian poetry and noted that her poem "Cras Nobis" was "easily the best Australian contribution" to the Australasian Students' Song Book, published in 1911 by George Robertson.

While her poetry was influenced by her classical studies, she was one of the earliest Australian writers to recognise the poetry of Emily Dickinson.

In 1912, Derham was one of the founding members of the Lyceum Club and was its president in 1918.

== Death and legacy ==
On 13 November 1941, Derham died suddenly of a brain haemorrhage at her home in Kew, Victoria, aged 59.

In 1958, Melbourne University Press released a posthumous collection of Derham's best work, titled Poems, which re-established her reputation as a poet.
