= E. Morris Miller =

Australian historian

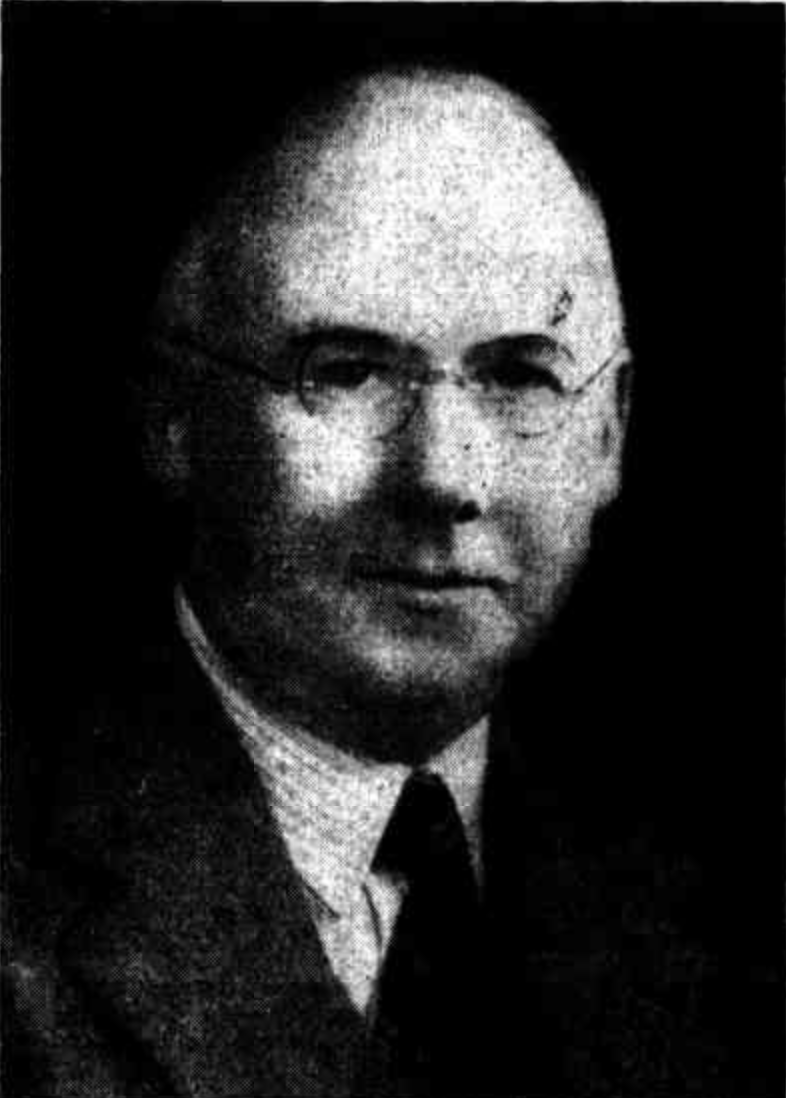
E. Morris Miller in 1940

Edmund Morris Miller, CBE (14 August 1881 – 21 October 1964), known as E. Morris Miller, was an Australian author, professor, and vice-chancellor of the University of Tasmania between 1933–1945.

Born in Pietermaritzburg, Colony of Natal on 14 August 1881, Miller moved with his family to Melbourne in 1883. He was educated at University High School and Wesley College. In 1900 he began working at the State Library of Victoria. He enrolled at the University of Melbourne obtaining a B.A. and in 1907 an M.A. with 1st class honours in philosophy.

He, along with F. J. Broomfield, Sir John Quick and others wrote the bibliographic Australian Literature from its Beginnings (two volumes, 1940). Authors he described include Carlton Dawe, Simpson Newland, John Henry Nicholson and Hume Nisbet. In 1956 this book was revised and extended to include works to 1950, edited by Frederick T Macartney. He also wrote on the beginnings of philosophy in Australia.

He also wrote Pressmen and Governors: Australian Editors and Writers in Early Tasmania (1952).

He was awarded the gold medal of the Australian Literature Society and elected a fellow of the British Psychological Society (1943) and of the International Institute of Arts and Letters.

Miller was Professor of Psychology and Philosophy at the University of Tasmania from 1922 until his retirement in 1950, and Vice-Chancellor from 1933 to 1945. In 1939–40 Miller managed the transfer from the Commonwealth, of a new site for the University at Sandy Bay.

The social science and humanities library on the Sandy Bay Campus at the University of Tasmania is named after Miller.

From 1924 Miller was also president of the Mental Deficiency Board. A trustee of the State Library of Tasmania, he became chairman in 1923 and was a founder of the Library Association of Australia in 1928.

He was appointed a Commander of the British Empire in 1963 in recognition of his contribution to tertiary education.

Miller died in Hobart on 21 October 1964 and was cremated.
