= The Teams =

1889 poem by Henry Lawson

- by Henry Lawson
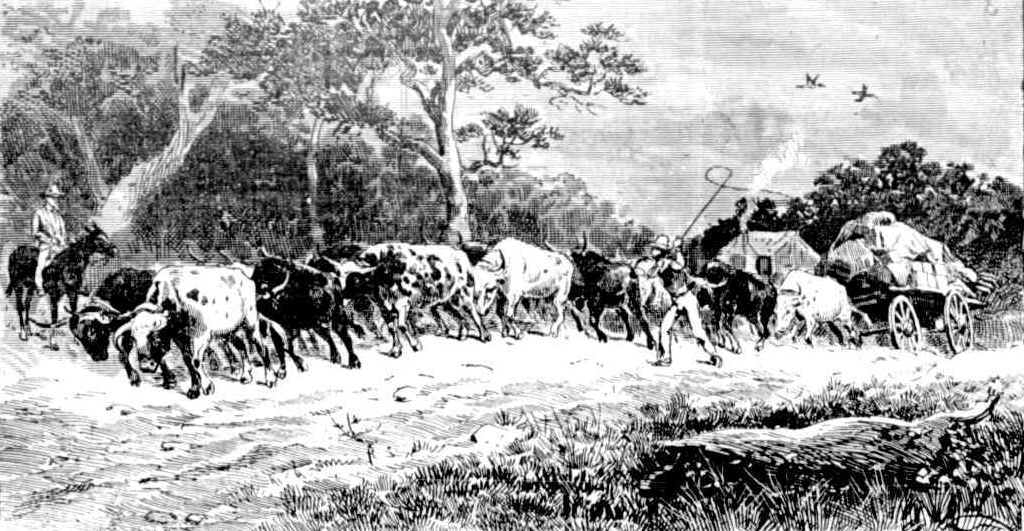
- Illustration from original publication of "The Teams"
- Written: 1889
- First published in: The Australian Town and Country Journal
- Country: Australia
- Language: English
- Publication date: 21 December 1889

Full text
- The Teams (Lawson) at Wikisource

The Teams is a poem by Australian writer and poet Henry Lawson. It was first published in the Australian Town and Country Journal on 21 December 1889. It was later published in the poet's poetry collection In the Days When the World Was Wide and Other Verses in 1896.

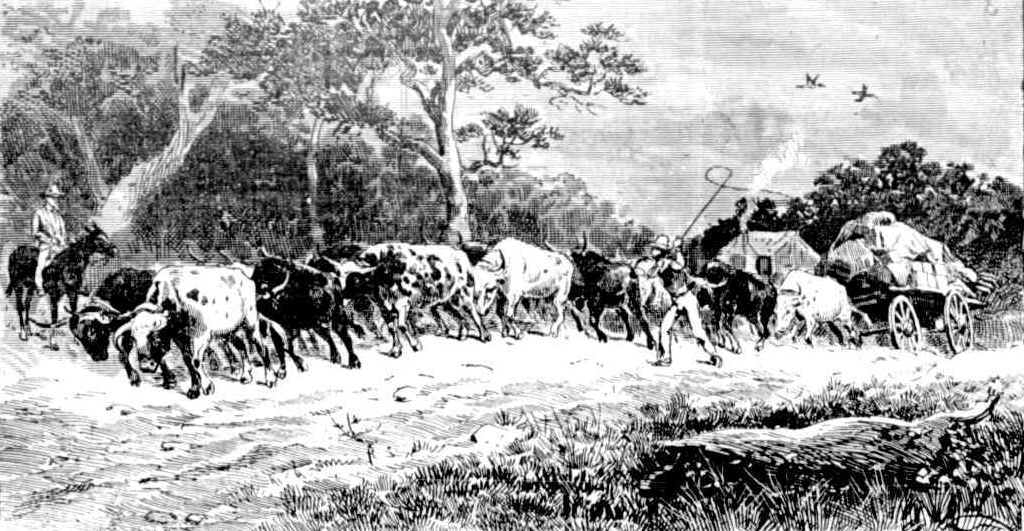
Illustration from original publication of "The Teams"

== Text ==
The text of the poem, as published in the Australian Town and Country Journal, is as follows:

A cloud of dust on the long white road;
And the teams go creeping on,
Inch by inch with the weary load;
And by the power of the green-hide goad
The distant goal is won.
With eyes half-shut from the blinding dust,
And necks to the yokes bent low,
The beasts are pulling as bullocks must,
Till the shining rims of the tire-rings rust;
While the spokes are turning slow.
With face half hid 'neath a wide brimm'd hat
That shades from the heat's white waves,
And shoulder'd whip with its green-hide plat,
The driver plods with a gait like that
Of his weary, patient slaves.
He wipes his brow, for the day is hot,
And spits to the left with spite;
He shouts at "Balley," and flicks at " Scot,"
And raises dust from the back of " Spot,"
And spits to the dusty right.
He'll sometimes pause as a thing of form
In front of a lonely door,
And ask for a drink, and remark " 'Tis warm,"
Or say "There's signs of a thunder-storm;"
But he seldom utters more.
But, ah ! there are other scenes than these;
And, passing his lonely home,
For weeks together the bushman sees
The teams bogg'd down o'er the axletrees,
Or ploughing the sodden loam.
And then when the roads are at their, worst,
The bushman's children hear
The cruel blows of the whips revers'd
While bullocks pull as their hearts would burst,
And bellow with pain and fear.
And thus with little of joy or rest
Are the long, long journeys done;
And thus—'tis a cruel war at the best—
Is distance fought in the lonely west,
And the lonely battles won.

== Critical reception ==
In a review of the poet's collection In the Days When the World Was Wide and Other Verses a writer in Freeman's Journal (Sydney) stated that "If one piece were to be chosen as an example of Mr. Lawson's quality as a writer of true bush ballads, the best piece is 'The Teams'".

== Further publications ==
- In the Days When the World was Wide and Other Verses by Henry Lawson (1896)
- The Children's Treasury of Australian Verse edited by Bertram Stevens (1913)
- Selected Poems of Henry Lawson by Henry Lawson, Angus and Robertson, 1918
- The Oxford Book of Australasian Verse edited by Walter Murdoch (1924)
- New Song in an Old Land edited by Rex Ingamells (1943)
- Favourite Australian Poems edited by Ian Mudie (1963)
- From the Ballads to Brennan edited by T. Inglis Moore, Angus & Robertson, 1964
- Bards in the Wilderness : Australian Colonial Poetry to 1920 edited by Adrian Mitchell and Brian Elliott, Nelson, 1970
- Poems of Henry Lawson edited by Walter Stone, Ure Smith, 1973
- The World of Henry Lawson edited by Walter Stone, Hamlyn, 1974
- The Collins Book of Australian Poetry compiled by Rodney Hall (1981)
- The Essential Henry Lawson : The Best Works of Australia's Greatest Writer edited Brian Kiernan, Currey O'Neil, 1982
- A Treasury of Colonial Poetry (1982)
- A Campfire Yarn : Henry Lawson Complete Works 1885-1900 edited by Leonard Cronin, Lansdowne, 1984
- My Country : Australian Poetry and Short Stories, Two Hundred Years edited by Leonie Kramer (1985)
- Henry Lawson : An Illustrated Treasury edited by Glenys Smith, Lansdowne, 1985
- A Collection of Australian Bush Verse (1989)
- A Treasury of Bush Verse edited by G. A. Wilkes, Angus and Robertson, 1991
- Australian Bush Poems (1991)
- Classic Australian Verse edited by Maggie Pinkney (2001)

== See also ==
- 1889 in poetry
- 1889 in literature
- 1889 in Australian literature
- Australian literature
