= Frederick Macartney =

Australian poet (1887–1980)

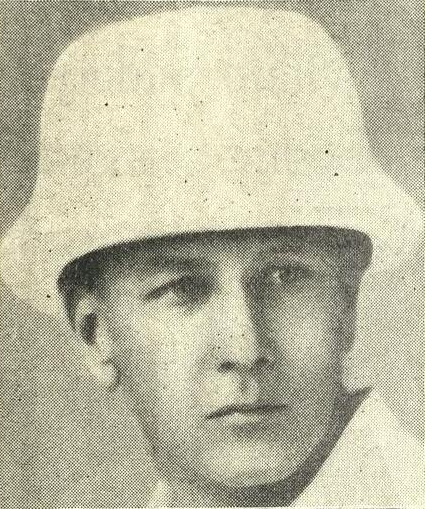
- Born: Frederick Thomas Bennett Macartney; September 27, 1887; Port Melbourne, Victoria
- Died: September 2, 1980 (aged 92); Blackburn South, Victoria
- Occupations: poet and critic
- Writing career
- Language: English

Frederick Thomas Bennett Macartney (27 September 1887 – 2 September 1980), poet and critic, was born in Port Melbourne, Australia. His byline was often Frederick T. Macartney.

== Life and writing career ==
Macartney attended Alfred Crescent State School until he was twelve, after which he held various jobs as a shop-assistant, before working as a bookkeeper on a Riverina station in 1910–12.

In 1921 Macartney went to Darwin as an assistant to the administrator of the Northern Territory, Frederic Charles Urquhart, and to the government secretary. Appointed public trustee in 1922, by 1924 he was the 'legal Pooh-Bah' of the Territory: sheriff, clerk of courts and judge's associate, registrar of companies, bankruptcy, and births, deaths and marriages, and returning officer.

In 1929, Macartney wrote A Sweep of Lute-strings, Being the Title Excusing a Very Few Love-rhymes. In 1947, he published Australian Poetry, a collection of twenty poems by Australian poets.

In 1956, he edited and updated E Morris Miller's Australian Literature from its Beginnings to 1935, under the title Australian Literature, a Bibliography to 1938, Extended to 1950. Also in 1956, he wrote the foreword to The Sonnet in Australasia, a Survey and Selection.

In 1957 he wrote A Historical Outline of Australian Literature. In 1961, Selected Poems of Frederick T. Macartney was published by the Commonwealth Literary Fund. In 1967, Macartney wrote and provided the illustrations for Proof Against Failure. In 1973, he wrote Australian Literary Essays.

Macartney's works and commentary have been published in The New Oxford Book of Australian Verse; Southerly: The Magazine of the Australian English Association, Sydney; The Australian Quarterly (by Australian Institute of Political Science); The Collins Book of Australian Poetry; Critical Essays on Kenneth Slessor (by Andrew Kilpatrick Thomson - 1968); Meanjin Papers (by Melbourne University Press); An Australian Anthology by Percival Serle; Birth: A Little Journal of Australian Poetry; Path to Parnassus: Anthology for Schools; Dream and Disillusion: A Search for Australian Cultural Identity; The Australian Librarian's Manual; British Book News; Lines of Implication: Australian Short Fiction from Lawson to Palmer; Catalog of the South Pacific Collection; and The Humanities in Australia: A Survey with Special Reference to the Universities.

Macartney died, childless, on 2 September 1980 at South Blackburn and was cremated.

== Bibliography ==
=== Poetry collection ===
- Dewed Petals : Verses (1912)
- Earthen Vessels : A Theme in Sonnets (1913)
- Poems (1920)
- Something for Tokens : Poems (1922)
- A Sweep of Lute-Strings : Being the Title Excusing a Very Few Love-Rhymes (1929)
- Hard Light and Other Verses (1933)
- Preferences : Poems (1941)
- Gaily the Troubadour : Satires in the Fixed Forms of Verse (1946)
- Carols of Cant and Wont : With Suitable Accompaniments and Prefatory Indications for a New Rhyming Dictionary (1958)
- Selected Poems of Frederick T. Macartney (1961)

=== Critical works ===
- Australian Literary Essays (1957)

=== Anthology edited ===
- Australian Poetry 1947 (1948)
