= Marie Pitt =

Australian poet and socialist activist

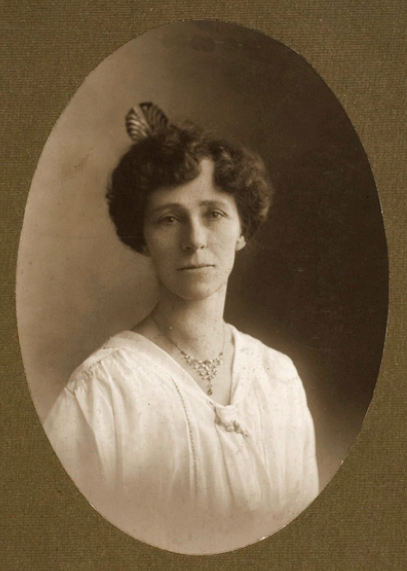
- Pitt circa 1924
- Born: Marie Elizabeth Josephine McKeown; 6 August 1869; Bullumwaal, Victoria
- Died: 20 May 1948 (aged 78); Kew, Victoria, Australia
- Other name: Marie Elizabeth Josephine Pitt
- Occupations: Activist; journalist; poet
- Political party: Victorian Socialist Party
- Partner: Bernard O'Dowd

Marie Elizabeth Josephine Pitt (1869–1948) was an Australian poet and socialist activist, also journalist and Unitarian. Pitt wrote very highly coloured nature poetry, once much anthologised; and also wrote poetry in support of the socialist and labour movements. Marie Pitt was the companion of fellow poet and socialist Bernard O'Dowd.

== Life ==
Pitt's maiden name was McKeown. She was born on 6 August 1869 in the gold-mining town of Bullumwaal in Gippsland region of the colony of Victoria, north of the town of Bairnsdale. Her early childhood was mostly spent in Wy Yung, a tiny settlement near Bairnsdale, where she laboured on her parents' "selection" or small farm. After failing to qualify as a teacher she found work in Bairnsdale as a photographic retoucher in 1887, and married the Tasmanian farmer and miner William Pitt in 1893 with whom she lived in Tasmania, the Western Australian goldfields, Bairnsdale again and finally Melbourne where she joined the Victorian Socialist Party and became editor of its journal The Socialist. In 1900 the prestigious Bulletin accepted one of her poems. Her first volume of poetry was published in 1911. William Pitt died in 1912 of a miners' disease. Marie and William Pitt had four children together, three of whom survived them.

After William Pitt's death Pitt worked at various white-collar jobs and pursued her writing, as well as her work with the Victorian Socialist Party. She lived with Bernard O'Dowd as her partner from 1920 until her death. She shared with him support for the Victorian Socialist Party, and for Unitarianism. Her political views were not identical with his, however; notably, and unlike O'Dowd, Marie Pitt took a strong pacifist line. Another matter on which they differed was the endemic racism of the Australian labour movement; Marie Pitt, in a word, supported it and spoke of the "woman's instinct for racial purity". O'Dowd took an anti-racist view.

Pitt won the Australian Broadcasting Commission national songwriting competition in 1944 with her entry Ave, Australia.

Pitt died on 20 May 1948 at Kew, Victoria.

== Poetry collections ==
- The Horses of the Hills (1911)
- Bairnsdale (1922)
- The Poems of Marie E. J. Pitt (1924)
- Selected Poems (1944)
