= Charles Tompson =

Australian public servant and poet (1807–1883)

- Born: June 26, 1807; Sydney, Australia
- Died: January 5, 1883 (aged 75); Sydney, Australia
- Occupations: Poet, public servant

Charles Tompson (26 June 1807 – 5 January 1883) was an Australian public servant, and it is claimed he was the first published Australian-born poet.

Tompson was born in 1806 in Sydney. He was the first child of the farmer Charles Tompson (c1784–1871) and his wife, Elizabeth, née Boggis. His father was a former convict. Tompson was educated by Henry Fulton in Castlereagh and then became a public servant. He published a collection of poetry, Wild Notes, from the Lyre of a Native Minstrel, in 1826.

He wrote another poem titled Australia. A Translation of the Latin Prize Poem of S. Smith, a Student of Hyde Abbey School, Winchester. It was published in the Sydney Gazette on 17 December 1829, and then in pamphlet form.

Tompson married Hannah Morris on 12 April 1830 at St Matthew's Church, Windsor. He worked as a clerk and lived in Kent Street, Sydney. He moved to Penrith in 1836, where he was a clerk of petty sessions. Later he was a clerk at Camden.

He then became a clerk for the Legislative Council of New South Wales and the legislative assembly. He retired on 31 January 1869 and died in Sydney on 5 January 1883.
