= Michael Griffith (novelist) =

American novelist

- Education: Louisiana State University (MFA)
- Occupations: Novelist; short story writer

Michael Griffith is an American novelist and short story writer. His stories and essays have appeared in literary journals such as The Oxford American, The Southwest Review, Salmagundi, and The Virginia Quarterly Review, among others.

Griffith received a Master of Fine Arts from LSU in Baton Rouge, and is the former associate editor of The Southern Review. He now works as a professor of creative fiction writing at the University of Cincinnati in Cincinnati, Ohio and teaches fiction writing at the Sewanee School of Letters at the University of the South in Sewanee, TN.

His published works include the novel Spikes out in 2001 as well as a novella plus collected stories entitled Bibliophilia released in 2003. Both works are published by Arcade Publishing.

The Speaking Stone: Stories Cemeteries Tell, "a literary love letter to the joys of wandering graveyards," was published by the University of Cincinnati Press in April 2021.
