= Lilian Wooster Greaves =

Australian botanist, poet (1869–1956)

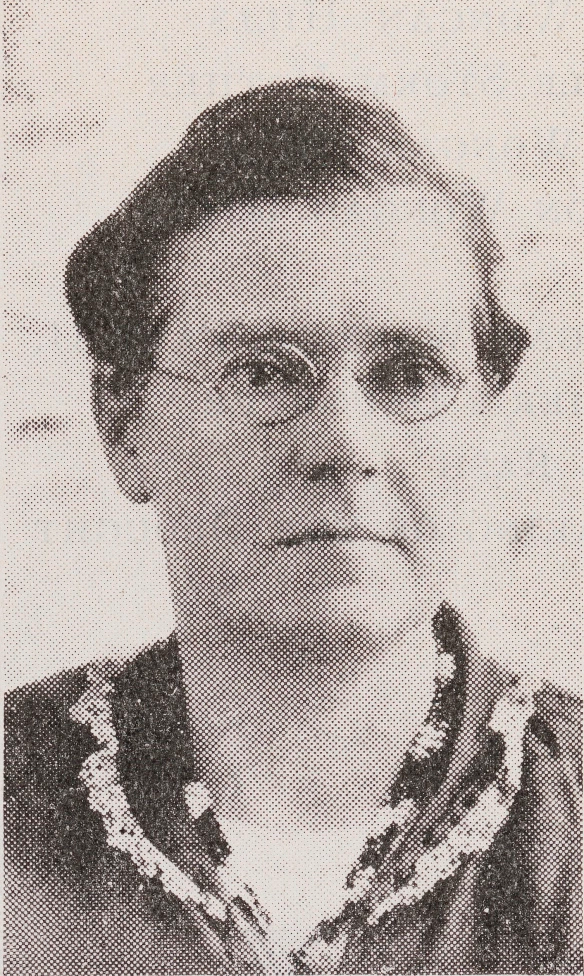
- Born: 21 December 1869
- Died: 28 January 1956

Lilian Wooster Greaves (21 December 1869 – 28 January 1956) was a Western Australian botanist and poet.

== Personal life ==
Greaves was born in Ballarat, Victoria, where her father, William H. Wooster, was lecturer of botany at the Federation University Australia. She married William John Greaves in February 1893 in Ballarat, and their children Mabel and Grace were born in Victoria and son Archibald in Sydney. The family arrived in Western Australia on RMS Orizaba in 1904. Daughters Elsie and Rose were born in the following three years in Perth and Cottesloe.

After the family moved to Western Australia, they lived at different stages in Wongan Hills, Mundaring, Cottesloe, and Leederville during the First World War. The last place of residence was in Como.

== Literary career ==
Greeves was a member of the Women Writers Club and representative of the Institute of British Poetry in Western Australia. Her poetry was regularly published in local newspapers and magazines. In 1915, she won first prize in The Bookman's annual poetry competition.

During the First World War she wrote patriotic verses and songs.

Some post war poetry was published in commemoration of Anzac Day.

Her papers are kept in the private archives of the State Library of Western Australia's Battye Library.

== Books of poetry ==
- Greaves, Lilian Wooster (1903), Poems by Lilian (an Australian poetess) (1st ed.), G. Baker Walker
- Greaves, Lilian Wooster (1906), The two doves and other poems, Upham & Williams
- Greaves, Lilian Wooster (1910), Roses in rain : and other poems, The Swan Express – reprinted in 1914
- Greaves, Lilian Wooster (1927). Wongan Way . Perth, Western Australia: Imperial Printing Company – via Wikisource. – also in an illustrated edition, combined with a booklet about wildflowers – Greaves, Lilian Wooster (1927), Wongan way, Imperial Printing (separate edition as:Greaves, Lilian Wooster (1927), West Australian wild flowers, Imperial Printing

== Poems in newspapers ==
- 1914 – The Advent Angel (The Ballarat Courier, Victoria)
- 1915 – Women's War (Bendigo Advertiser, Victoria)
- 1915 – Roses in Rain (The Advocate, Melbourne, Australia)
- 1916 – Peace or War (The Watchman, Sydney, Australia)
- 1920 – Where love dwells
- 1921 – New Thoughts (Western Mail, Perth, Western Australia)
- 1925 – Hope (Western Mail, Perth, Western Australia)
- 1926 – England (Western Mail, Perth, Western Australia)
- 1926 – Remembrance (Western Mail, Perth, Western Australia)
- 1926 – How the Wild Flowers Came (The Capricornian, Rockhampton, Queensland)
- 1943 – Birds at Wongan Hills (The Methodist, Sydney, Australia)
