= Frederick Spencer Burnell =

Australian journalist

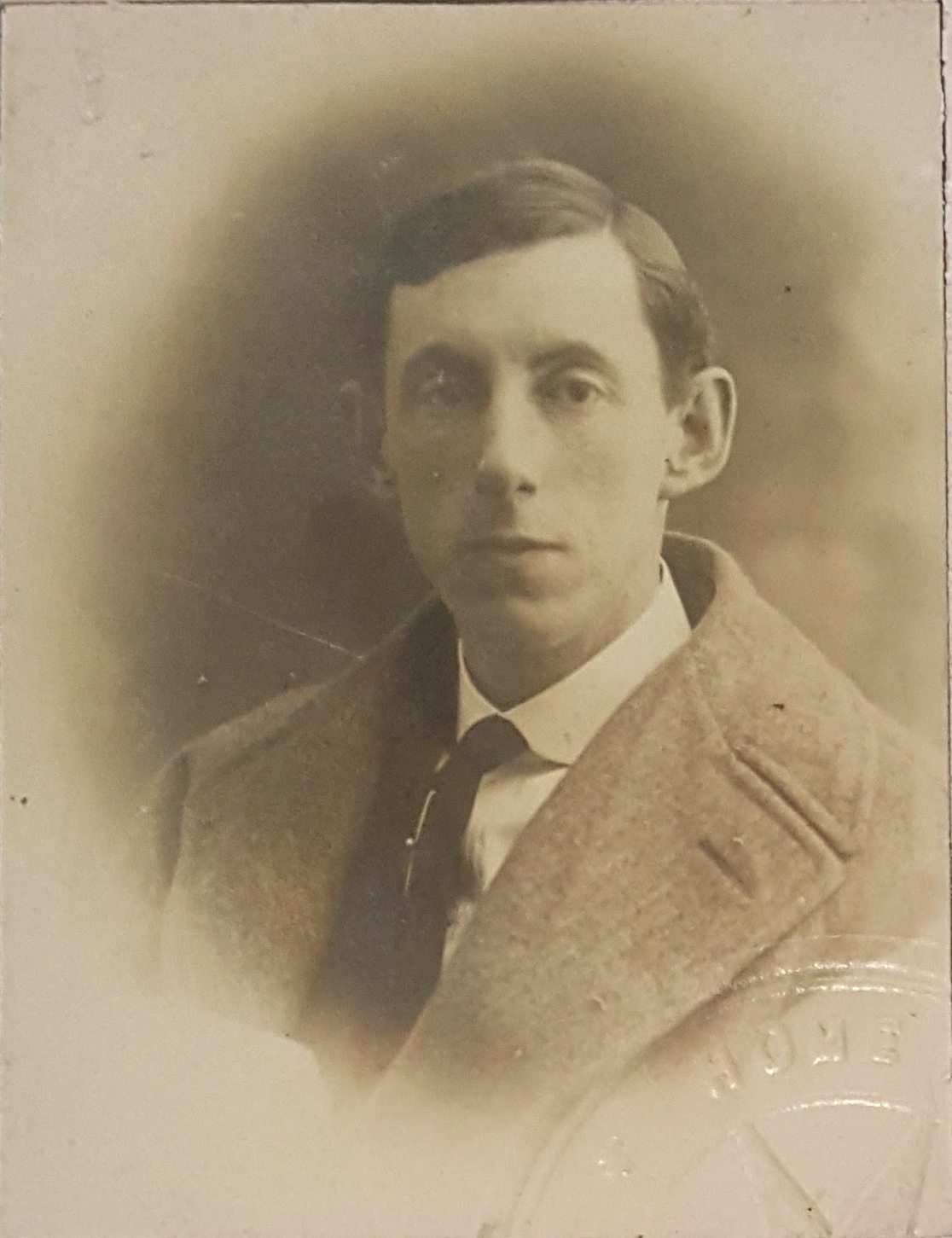
- Portrait of F. S. Burnell by E. Hawley
- Born: 1 February 1880; Melbourne, Victoria, Australia
- Died: 10 February 1958 (aged 78)
- Other names: Fritz S. Burnell
- Occupation: Reporter
- Years active: 1890–1930
- Known for: 'special correspondent' for the Sydney Morning Herald with the New Guinea expedition in 1914,
- Notable work: How Australia Took German New Guinea (1914), and an expanded version of the same, Australia versus Germany: The Story of the Taking of German New Guinea (1915)'

Frederick Spencer Burnell (1 February 1880 – 10 February 1958) was an Australian journalist and radio presenter. He worked for many years as a radio host on ABC Radio Sydney but one of his most significant assignments was as a special correspondent with the Australian Naval and Military Expeditionary Force who were sent to seize and destroy German wireless stations in German New Guinea in 1914.

== History ==
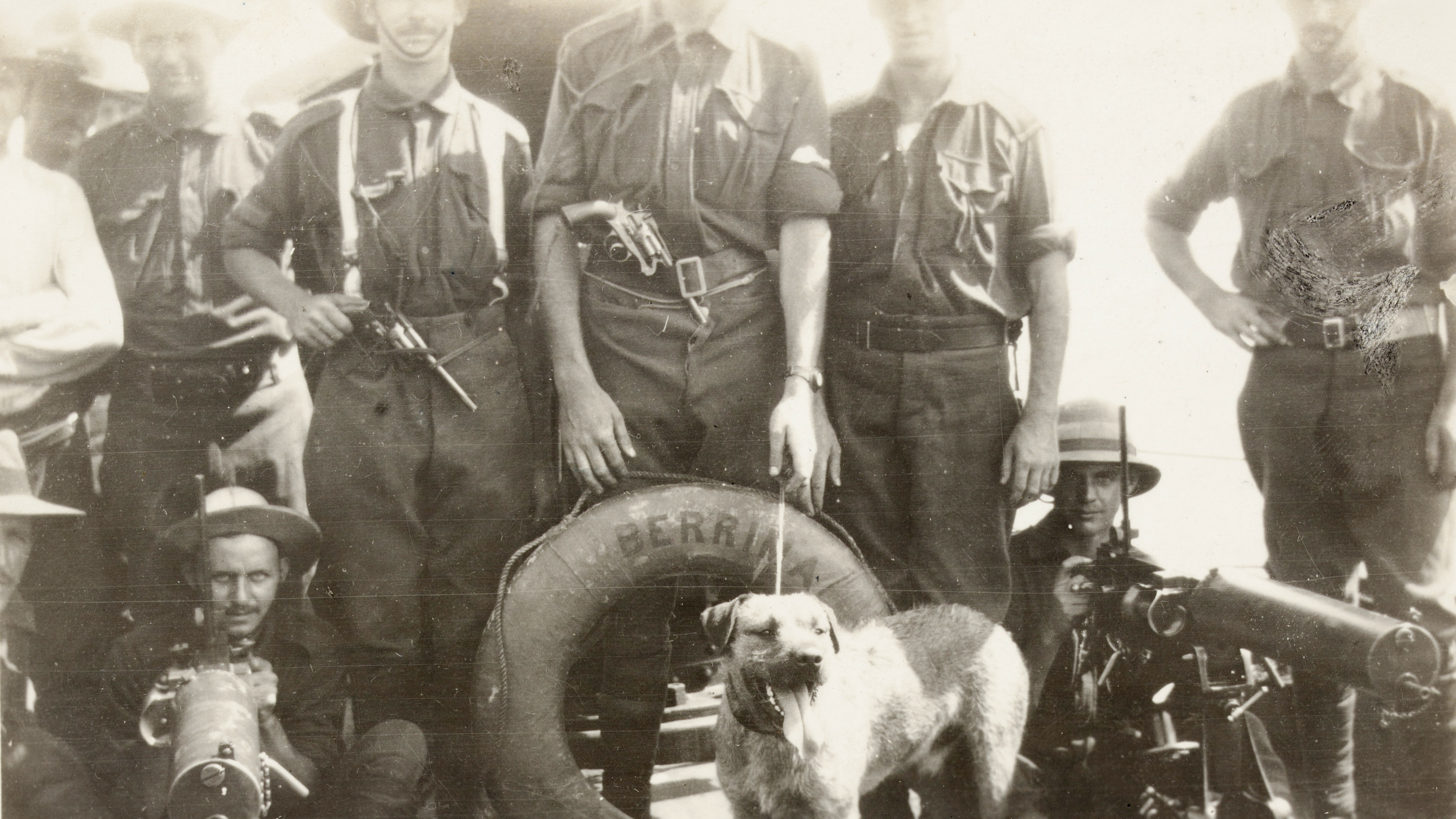
Machine gunners and soldiers of the first Australian Expeditionary force, 1914, F. S. Burnell PXA 2165

Frederick Spencer Burnell was born in Melbourne in 1886 and lived there until his family moved to Sydney. He graduated with a B.A. from Sydney University.

He published a book of poetry in 1912 and in 1914, after being rejected for active service, was assigned by the Sydney Morning Herald as a special correspondent with the Australian Naval and Military Expeditionary Force. This was a small volunteer force of approximately 2,000 men, raised in Australia shortly after the outbreak of the First World War which was sent to seize and destroy German wireless stations in German New Guinea in the southwestern Pacific. The force left Sydney on the 19 August on board the P. & O. Company's steamer the Berrima. This force was historically significant as it was the first to engage in fighting on Australia's own account. Burnell's photographs were used in his illustrated record of the events which was published by Angus and Robertson in November 1914.

Burnell's publication covers life on board ship on the way to New Britain, the actions of the forces under Colonel William Holmes and the surrender signed at Herbertshohe (Kokopo) by Dr. Haber.

After World War One he visited Cape Town, Dakar, Dunkirk, Ypres, Hull and then London where he attended a dinner given by the P.E.N. club which was in honour of the 70th birthday of H. G. Wells. Burnell and his wife also toured England and Scotland in a car. Over this period he also worked as a reporter for the Manchester Daily Dispatch, the London Daily, Sketch, and the Evening Standard. After this he travelled through Italy and Greece and lived in Rome for a number of years.

From the early 1930s Burnell hosted a Sunday afternoon show of "armchair chats" titled "Ships, Shoes and Sealing Wax" for the Sydney radio station 2BL. These stories often related to his travels in Europe.
