= Arthur Bayldon =

Australian poet

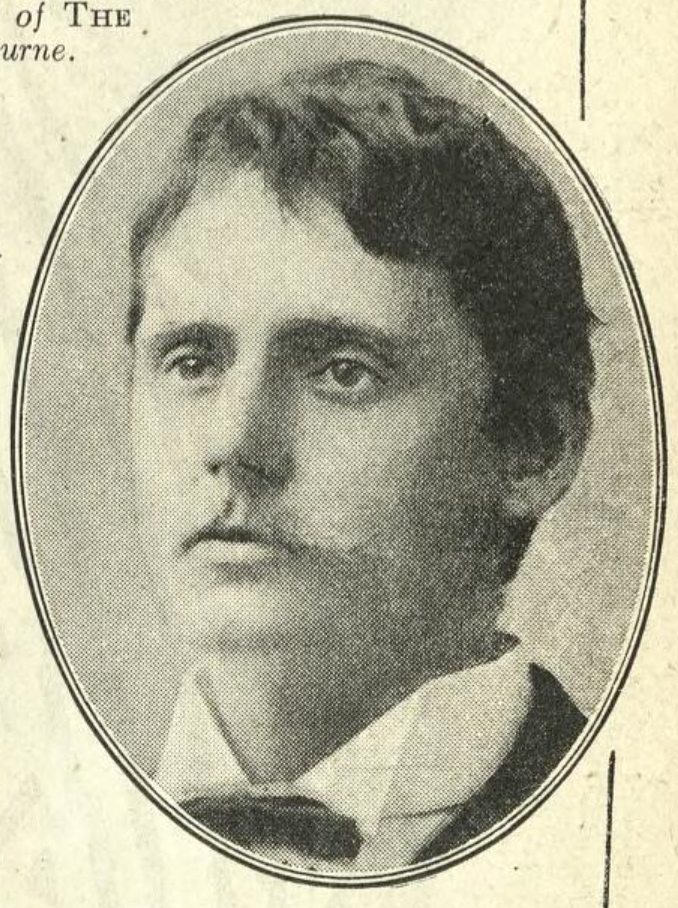
- Bayldon in a 1930 publication
- Born: Arthur Albert Dawson Bayldon; 20 March 1865; Leeds, Yorkshire, England
- Died: 26 September 1958 (aged 93); Randwick, New South Wales, Australia
- Occupations: Poet; literary critic; short story writer
- Writing career
- Language: English
- Years active: 1887–1932

Arthur Bayldon (20 March 1865 – 26 September 1958) was an English-born Australian poet.

== Life ==
Bayldon was born in 1865, at Leeds, England, and was educated at Leeds Grammar School. He emigrated to Brisbane in 1889 prior to which he had travelled extensively in Europe. He was an excellent swimmer, and drew much attention to a stroke of his own invention – underwater on his back, with legs and arms bound.

He was literary critic for The Bulletin, and as a bush poet has been ranked with Henry Lawson, Banjo Patterson, Will Ogilvie, E. J. Brady, and Rod Quinn.

He died in 1958, aged 93.

== Bibliography ==
=== Poetry collections ===
- Lays and Lyrics (1887)
- Poems (1897)
- The Western Track and Other Verses (1905)
- The Eagles : Collected Poems of Arthur Bayldon (1921)
- Apollo in Australia; and Bush Verses (1944)

=== Short story collection ===
- The Tragedy Behind the Curtain and Other Stories (1910)
