= John Laurence Rentoul =

Australian poet (1846–1926)

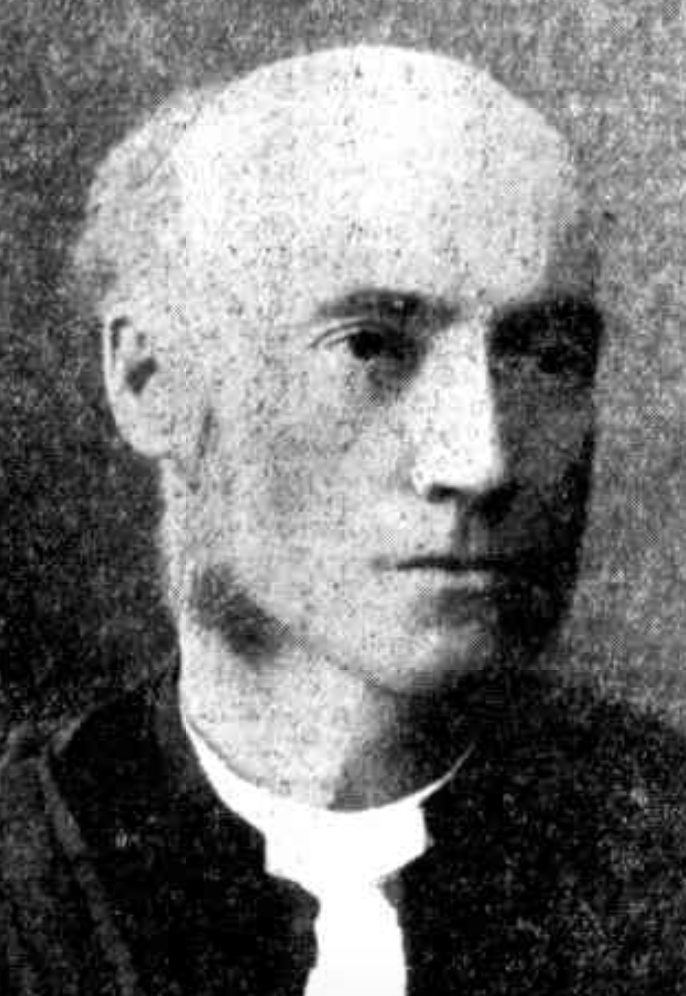
Irish-born Australian Presbyterian minister (1845-1926)

John Laurence Rentoul (6 July 1845 – 15 April 1926), was a member of the Presbyterian clergy and a poet.

== Early life ==
John Laurence Rentoul was born in Garvagh, County Londonderry, Ireland, fourth son of the Reverend James Buchan Rentoul, D.D. and his wife Sarah, née Wilson. He was baptised on 10 August 1845 in his father’s church (now known as Main Street Presbyterian), Garvagh as the Baptismal register records. He studied English literature, history and economic science at Queen's College, Belfast, graduating with a B.A. in 1867 and M.A. in 1868. He also did some post-graduate work at Leipzig, Germany 1878-79 en route to Australia.

== Career ==
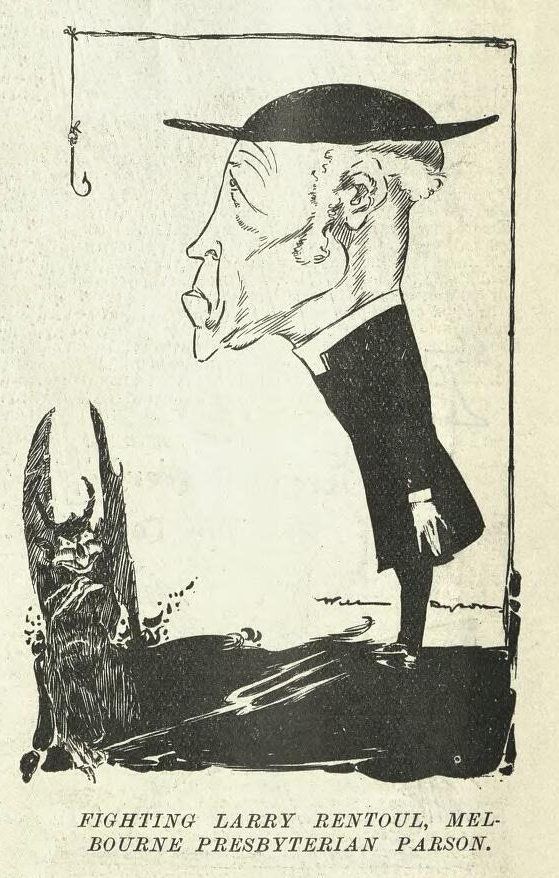
Caricature of 'Fighting Larry Rentoul' by Will Dyson, The Bulletin, 22 August 1907.

Rentoul was ordained a minister of the Presbyterian Church of England in 1872 and became incumbent of St George's Church, Southport, Lancashire. While at Southport, Rentoul married Annie Isobel, daughter of D. T. Rattray on 30 October 1878. The wealthy congregation of St George's Church, East St Kilda, Victoria, Australia had been seeking a minister from the British Isles and Rentoul was nominated by London preacher Oswald Dykes. Rentoul and his wife arrived in Australia in 1879..

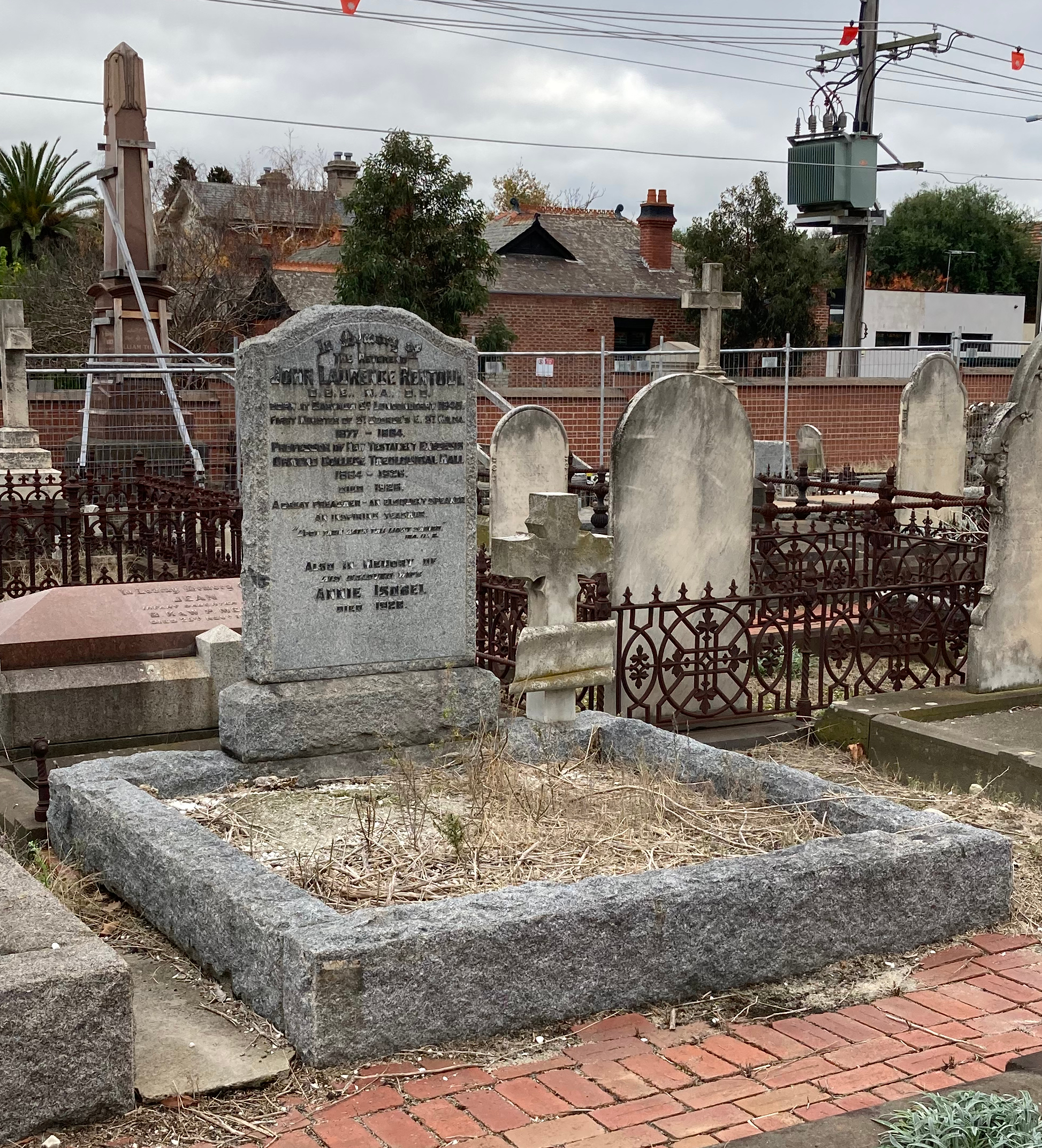
Rentoul's grave at St. Kilda Cemetery

Rentoul died on 15 April 1926. He was buried in St Kilda Cemetery following a funeral service at Scots' Church, Melbourne.
