= Henry Laurie =

Henry Laurie (1837/1838?–14 May 1922) was an Australian philosopher, a journalist, and the first professor of philosophy at the University of Melbourne.

Laurie was educated at the University of Edinburgh where he was strongly influenced by the philosopher Alexander Campbell Fraser. Laurie did not graduate from the university for health reasons, and then moved first to Canada, then to Victoria. In Australia, he became a journalist and contributed to the Warrnambool Examiner, and subsequently edited the weekly newspaper, the Warrnambool Standard, in partnership with a printer and journalist named William Fairfax. His interests remained literary and philosophical throughout.

In 1886, he was offered the job of Chair of Mental and Moral Philosophy at Melbourne, having written two articles on philosophy. One, "A Plea for Philosophy", rebutted objections to the study of philosophy including those who were worried that the study of philosophy would "be antagonistic to the Christian faith". The second piece, "The Study of Mental Philosophy", also broadly advocated the study of philosophy and rebutted criticisms from those who said the endeavour was "useless or impossible". As a professor, Laurie kept his philosophical opinions to himself but was critical of the works of Herbert Spencer. His teaching of logic drew on William Hamilton's writings.

He received an honorary LL.D from St Andrew's University in 1886. On 11 January 1871, he married Frances, the daughter of William Spalding. They had three sons.
