= George Gordon McCrae =

Australian poet

- Born: 29 May 1833; Leith, Scotland
- Died: 15 August 1927 (aged 94); Hawthorn, Australia
- Children: 6, including Hugh
- Mother: Georgiana McCrae
- Writing career
- Genre: Poetry
- Notable works: Two Old Men's Tales of Love and War

George Gordon McCrae (29 May 1833 – 15 August 1927) was an Australian poet.

== Early life ==
George Gordon McCrae was born in Leith, Scotland on 29 May 1833. His father was Andrew Murison McCrae, a writer and his mother was Georgiana McCrae, a painter. McCrae attended a preparatory school in London, and later received lessons from his mother. Georgiana and her four sons emigrated to Melbourne in 1841, following her husband who had emigrated in 1839.

== Career ==
After a few years as a surveyor, McCrae joined the Victorian Government service, eventually becoming Deputy Registrar-General, and also a prominent figure in literary circles. Most of his leisure time was spent in writing. His first published work was Two Old Men's Tales of Love and War (London, 1865).

His son Hugh McCrae, also a poet, produced a volume of memoirs (My Father and My Father's Friends) about George and his association with such literary figures as Henry Kendall, Adam Lindsay Gordon, Richard Henry Horne and Marcus Clarke.

McCrae wrote novels, stories, poetry, and travel sketches, and illustrated books. After his retirement, unpublished manuscripts entitled 'Reminiscences—Experiences not Exploits' contain detailed descriptions of events from his youth and present a record of the early European part of Melbourne country-side.

== Late life ==
McCrae died 15 August 1927 at Hawthorn in Melbourne, survived by four of his six children, including Dorothy Frances Perry, also an author.

== Bibliography ==
- Two Old Men's Tales of Love and War (1865)
- The Story of Balladeadro (1867)
- Mamba, the Bright-Eyed: an Aboriginal Reminiscence (1867)
- The Man in the Iron Mask (1873)
- The Fleet and Convoy (1915)
- John Rous (1918)
