= Frank S. Williamson =

Australian poet

Francis Samuel Williamson
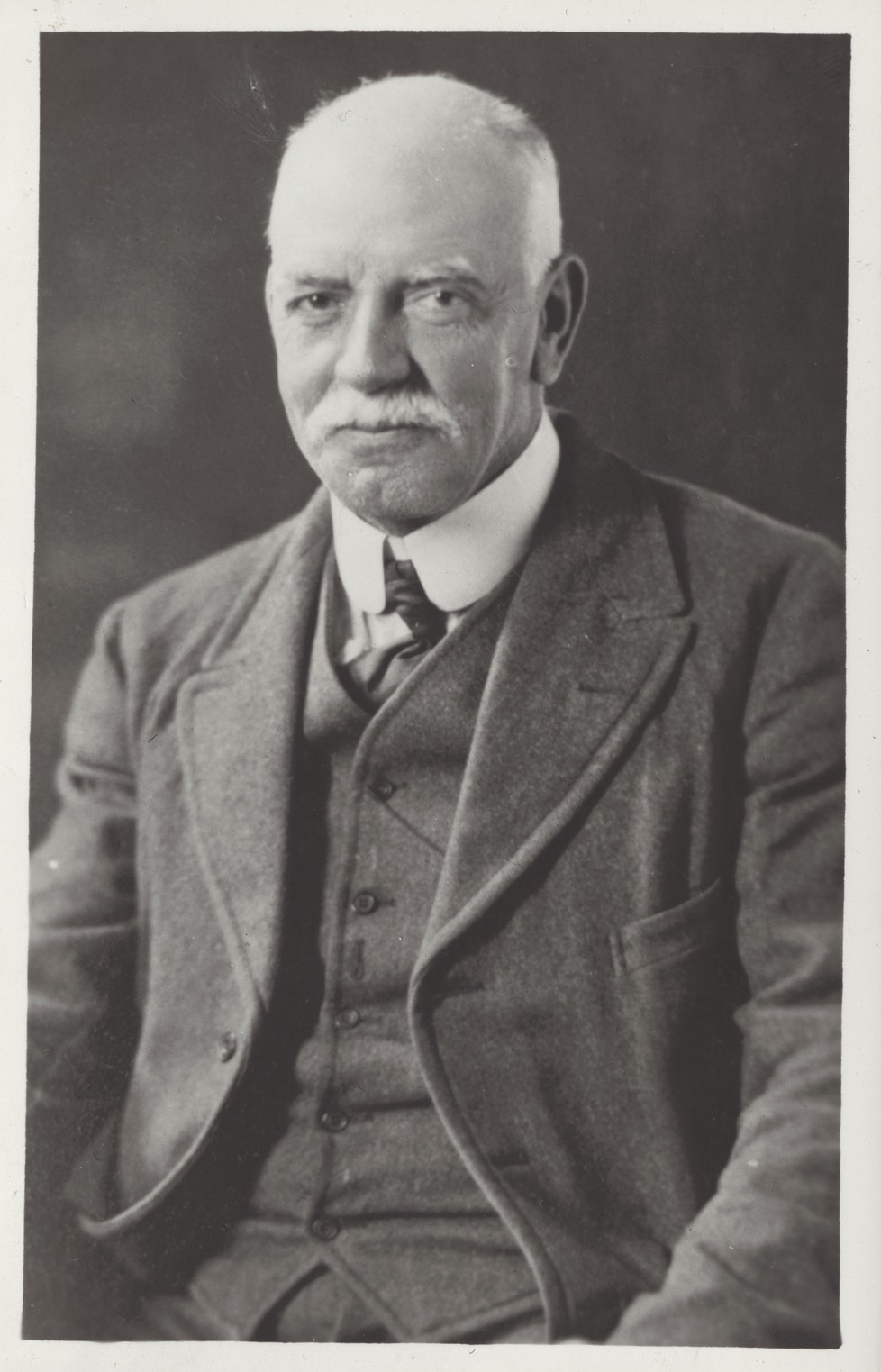
- Frank S. Williamson, c.1920
- Born: Francis Samuel Williamson; 18 January 1865; London, Middlesex, England
- Died: 6 February 1936; Melbourne, Victoria, Australia
- Known for: Poet, Schoolteacher

Francis Samuel Williamson (18 January 1865 – 6 February 1936) was an Australian poet who was published under the name Frank S. Williamson.

== Early life ==
Williamson was the son of an English-born coachmaker and his Scottish wife. He was born in Fitzroy, Victoria, and attended Scotch College, Melbourne.

== Teaching career ==
In 1882 he was appointed as a pupil-teacher at Flemington State School and the following year moved to North Melbourne State School. Williamson taught at Wesley College, Melbourne from 1888 until 1894 under Arthur Way's headship. He was popular as a junior master and was known as Long Bill. His classes were informal and easy-going for the boys — a situation not entirely agreeable to all his students. As an Old Boy, Sir Frederic Eggleston was severe: "while a good poet who inspired many boys with a love of poetry, Williamson was irregular and though he was kept on for many years … became almost an outcast." Williamson moved to Sydney in 1894 to join Arthur Lucas's staff at Newington College. While at Newington he wrote the words for the school song, Dear Newingtonia. In 1902 he returned to Wesley to teach, to coach rowing and cricket and to serve as an officer of cadets. In 1904 he was dismissed for drunkenness. The rest of Williamson's teaching career was spent as a locum in the Victorian Department of Education. He was a temporary head teacher in fifty-four rural schools between 1905 and 1930.

== Creative career ==
With Bernard O'Dowd he belonged to a discussion group called The Heretics.

A collection of Williamson's poetry, Purple and Gold, containing twenty-eight poems, was published by Thomas Lothian in 1912, under the name Frank S. Williamson. His best known poem, The Magpie's Song, appeared in several anthologies over the next two decades. The first edition of the anthology had several misprints. The new book of poetry contained fifty-five poems and was published with a foreword by Sir John Latham, the Chief Justice of the High Court of Australia. He saw "a lyrical quality of delicate beauty" in Williamson's work. Percival Serle considered him a strange case of an educated man writing a fair amount of verse of small merit until in middle life 'something blossomed in him and he wrote half a dozen quite beautiful poems'.

On his retirement the Commonwealth awarded Williamson a literary pension. He died in Melbourne having never married.

== Bibliography ==
- R. H. Croll, I Recall (Melb, 1939)
- G. Blainey (et al.), Wesley College (Melb, 1967)
- D.S. Macmillan, Newington College 1863-1963 (Syd, 1963)
- P.L. Swain Newington, Across the Years 1893-1998 (Syd, 1999)
