= John Philip Bourke =

Australian poet

- Born: 5 August 1857; Nundle, New South Wales
- Died: 13 January 1914 (aged 56); Boulder, Western Australia
- Occupation: poet

John Philip Bourke (5 August 1857 – 13 January 1914) was an Australian poet.

Bourke was born in Nundle, New South Wales, on the Peel River diggings, New South Wales, the son of William David Bourke, butcher, and his wife Jane, née Shepherd. After a primary education, he became a prospector with his father. He occasionally contributed verse to The Bulletin. He retired from the education department in 1887 after being found drunk by a school inspector.

Bourke died at Boulder, Western Australia, on 13 January 1914.

Bourke's own estimation of his talent was modest:

We singers standing on the outer rim
Who touched the fringe of poesy at times
With half-formed thoughts, rough-set in halting rhymes,
Through which no airy flights of fancy skim —
We write "just so", an hour to while away,
And turn the well-thumbed stock still o'er and o'er …
