= Will Lawson =

Australian poet and writer (1876–1957)

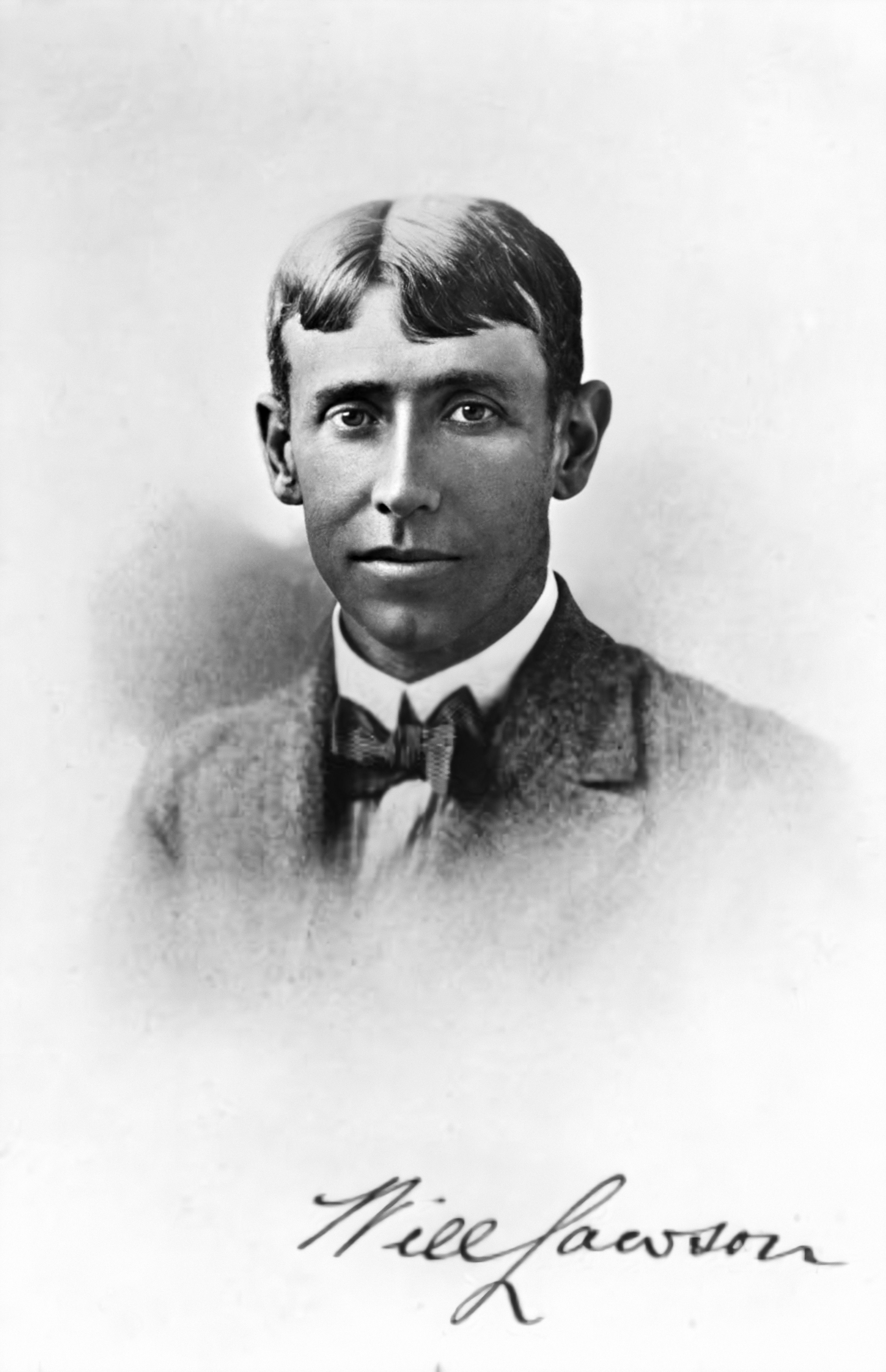
- Lawson (undated)
- Born: William Lawson; 2 September 1876; Low Fell, Gateshead, County Durham, England
- Died: 13 October 1957 (aged 81); Sydney, New South Wales, Australia
- Occupations: Poet, author

Will Lawson (2 September 1876 – 13 October 1957), born in Low Fell, Gateshead, County Durham, England, was a popular bush poet, novelist, journalist and historian of Australia. Many of his works had sailing or stage coach themes.

== Early life ==
Born at Gateshead, County Durham, England, the family was of Scandinavian descent, with the family name originally of Larsen. Moving with his family to New Zealand at the age of four, they first lived in Wellington, New Zealand.

The family moved to Brisbane, Australia around 1885, where Lawson received some education, then moved back to Wellington, New Zealand, where he worked as a clerk in an insurance office, and began writing poems for The Bulletin.

Lawson was a fireman on the Wellington & Manawatu Railway Company, and wrote a poem Firin’ on the Mail:

Fill her tank and give her coal
Clear her fires, and then
Let the big-wheeled Yankee roll
Down the grades again.

For World War I, Lawson was rejected by the New Zealand military for the mounted infantry because of his diabetes. He wrote a book on the Trentham Military Camp in WWI.

== Career ==
In 1912 Lawson returned to Australia and joined the staff of Sydney's Evening News, also writing for Smith's Weekly and The Bulletin.

In 1924 and 1925 Lawson went to San Francisco as the publicity officer for the Union Steamship Company. In 1929, he then undertook an extensive tour of the 'Far East'.

From 1932, Lawson has been freelancing literature.

He was associated with the Sydney Bohemian artistic scene and such well-known figures as poet and later politician Randolph Bedford (1868–1941), journalist and writer Edward Dyson (1865–1931), illustrator Will Dyson (1880–1938), artist Livingston Hopkins (1846–1927), landscape painter Percy Lindsay (1870–1952), and poet Roderic Quinn (1867–1949).

Although not related to poet Henry Lawson (1867–1922), they were lifelong friends, and a friend of his widow Bertha. However, both Lawsons came from Norwegian families who had anglicised the name from Larsen.

== Later life ==
Lawson died in Sydney in 1957, aged 81.

Some literary historians did not know whether to list Lawson as an Australian or a New Zealand writer, although Lawson considered himself Australian.

== Selected works ==
=== Poetry ===
- The Red West Road (1903)
- Light love (1904)
- Between the Lights (1906)
- Stokin' and Other Verses (1908)
- The tug that went a-trawling (1909)
- The Three Kings (1914)
- To the Fallen (c. 1917)
- Bush Verses (1943)
- Bill the Whaler (1944)

=== Novels ===
- Red West Road (1906)
- The Laughing Buccaneer (1935), based on the career of blackbirder 'Bully' Hayes
- When Cobb and Co. was King (1936), possibly his best-known book
- Old Man Murray (1937)
- Harpoons ahoy! (1938)
- In Ben Boyd's Day (1939), considered to be his best to date, in a historical setting of a gentleman adventurer
- Red Morgan Rides (1940)
- Bound for Callao (1942)
- Black Diamonds (1945)
- The Lady of the Heather (1945), an historical novel about Campbell Island, New Zealand, and the stranding of a Scottish Jacobite there.
- Forbidden Gold (1945)
- Paddle Wheels Away (1945)
- Gold in their Hearts (1950), republished as Mary Smith's Hotel (1957)

With fellow author Tom Hickey:

- Galloping Wheels (1947)
- Moira of Green Hills (1950), set in the paddle-steamer days of trade between the Hunter River and Sydney, about an Irish colleen Moira.

=== Short stories ===
- A stokehold tragedy (1909)
- A pack track knight (1913)
- The buggy ride (1935)

=== Miscellaneous ===
- The Three Kings, and other verses (1914), 250 pages of many verses and poems, including The Old Ngahauranga Road, published by Angus & Robertson, being sold for the cost of 2 shillings 7 pence.

Edited:

- Australian Bush Songs and Ballads (1944)

Historical:

- Historic Trentham 1914–1917: The story of a New Zealand Military Training Camp (1917).
- Pacific steamers (1928), about the development of steam shipping on the Australian, and West American coasts. It contained 237 pages with illustrations, and sold for 16 shillings.
- Blue Gum Clippers and Whale Ships of Tasmania (1949), in conjunction with the Shiplovers' Society of Tasmania, Georgian House, Melbourne.

== Sources ==
- Wilde, William H, Hooton, Joy, Andrews, Barry Oxford Companion to Australian Literature Oxford University Press, 2nd ed. 1994 ISBN 0 19553381 X
