= Thomas William Heney =

Australian journalist and poet

Thomas William Heney (3 November 1862 – 19 August 1928) was an Australian journalist and poet.

Caricature by David Low

Heney was the son of Thomas William Heney (Snr), a printer, and Sarah Elizabeth, née Carruthers. He was born in Sydney and educated at Cooma. Heney Senior struggled with alcohol dependence and died in 1875.

== Novels ==
- The Girl at Birrell's (1896)
- A Station Courtship (1899)

== Poetry collections ==
- Fortunate Days (1886)
- In Middle Harbour and Other Verse, Chiefly Australian (1890)
