= Richard Rowe (writer) =

British writer (1828–1879)

Richard Rowe (9 March 1828 – 9 December 1879) was an English writer, also active in Australia.

He belonged to a circle of writers which included Frank Fowler, William Wilkes and Sheridan Moore.

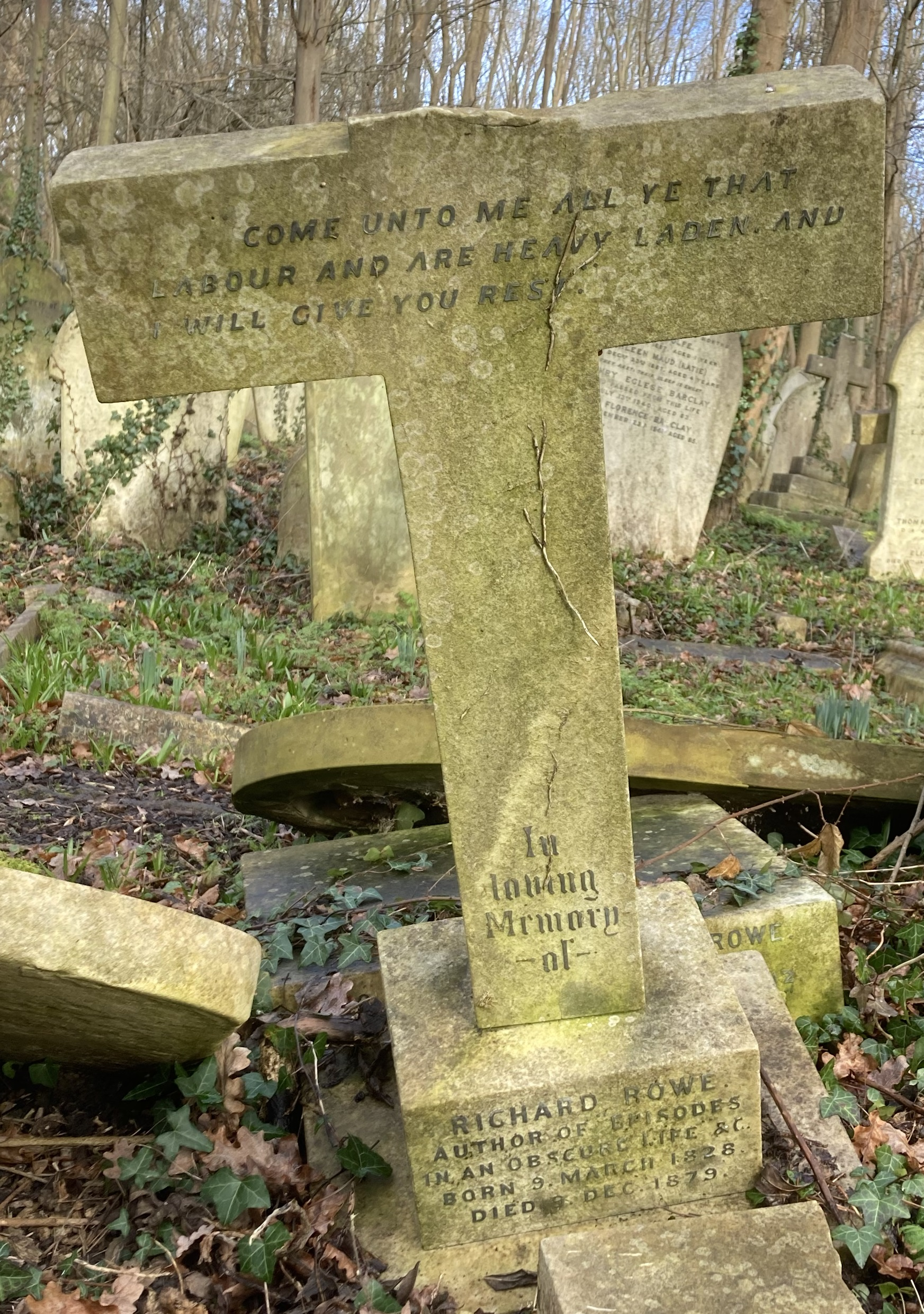
Grave of Richard Rowe in Highgate Cemetery

He was buried on the eastern side of Highgate Cemetery.

== Publications ==
- The Boy in the Bush: A Tale of Australian Life
- Roughing It
- The Deserted Ship
- A Haven of Rest
