= Sydney Jephcott =

Australian poet

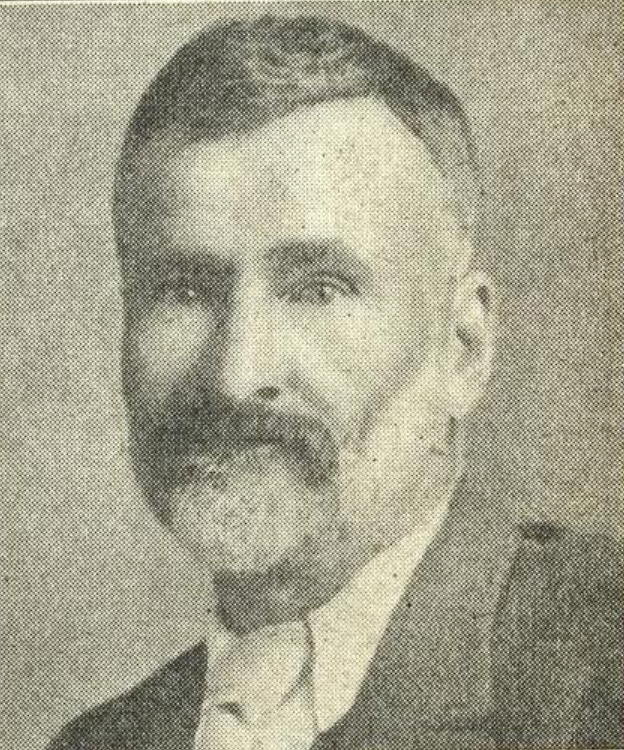
- Born: Sydney Wheeler Jephcott; 30 November 1864; Tallangatta in the Corryong area, Victoria, Australia
- Died: 3 July 1951 (aged 86); Albury, New South Wales, Australia
- Occupation: writer
- Writing career
- Language: English
- Years active: 1888–1947

Sydney Wheeler Jephcott (30 November 1864 – 3 July 1951) was an Australian poet.

== Background ==
Jephcott was the fifth child of Edwin Jephcott and his wife Susannah, née Sansome, ribbon weavers from Coventry, Warwickshire, England.

== Poetry career ==
He published his first poem in the 1888 Christmas edition of The Bulletin magazine and continued to publish his poetry until near his death in 1951.

His first poetry coincided with J. F. Archibald's editorship of The Bulletin and he became friends with a number of poets who were also part of the Bulletin school, such as John Farrell and Francis Adams.

Although not prolific — only two collections of his work were published in his lifetime — his work appeared in several important and influential Australian poetry anthologies, including An Anthology of Australian Verse (1907), Freedom on the Wallaby : Poems of the Australian People (1953), Bards in the Wilderness : Australian Colonial Poetry to 1920 (1970) and From the Ballads to Brennan (1964).

Variously known as a "rugged poet" and "the Poet of the Murray", Jephcott was described by literary critic Nettie Palmer as "...a remarkable man, full of humour and vision, as well as being a fine poet and literary influence."

Sydney Jephcott was read by Alfred Deakin, Australia's 2nd Prime Minister. Both Deakin and Jephcott exchanged written correspondence and the letters are available to be read at Australian National Library Canberra.Item 4/729-31. From Alfred Deakin to Sydney Jephcott, Item 4/728. From Sydney Jephcott to Alfred Deakin (Subseries 4.8.1)

== Poetry collections ==
- The Secrets of the South : Australian Poems (1892)
- Penetralia (1912)
