= Frank Wilmot =

Australian poet (1881–1942)

- Born: Frank Leslie Thomson Wilmot; 6 April 1881; Collingwood, Victoria, Australia
- Died: 22 February 1942 (aged 60); Surrey Hills, Victoria, Australia
- Occupations: Poet and dramatist
- Writing career
- Period: 1897-1942

Frank Leslie Thomson Wilmot (6 April 1881 – 22 February 1942), who published his work under the pseudonym Furnley Maurice, was a noted Australian poet, best known for To God: From the Warring Nations (1917).

== Early life ==
Frank Wilmot was born in Collingwood, Victoria, on 6 April 1881 to Henry William Wilmot and his wife Elizabeth Mary. He was educated at both Clifton Hill and North Fitzroy State schools before leaving, at the age of 13, to work in E. W. Cole's Book Arcade in the city.

He began writing verse while still a child and had his first verse published in The Tocsin when he was sixteen.

== Writing career ==
He began publishing a monthly magazine, The Microbe, in 1901, printing his own verse under his pseudonym of "Furnley Maurice", a pen-name he was to continue to use for the rest of his writing life.

His first verse published in The Bulletin appeared in the 2 February 1905 issue under his pen-name after being repeatedly rejected by the magazine's editor Alfred George Stephens.

On 24 August 1910 he married Ida Lizzie Meeking at Christ Church, St Kilda. The pair would go on to have two sons.

Wilmot was associated with the Victorian Socialist Party and this, along with his pacificst leanings, moved him to oppose conscription during World War I. In 1916 he founded the Melbourne Literary Club and became printer of the club's journal Birth. He was later prominent in the Fellowship of Australian Writers and campaigned on its members' behalf against censorship and for copyright protections.

He continued to work at E. W. Cole's Book Arcade until its closure in 1929, going on to be a bookseller in Little Collins Street for several years before becoming the first full-time manager of the Melbourne University Press.

He wrote throughout his life, producing 11 volumes of poetry, a number of plays and short stories, as well as writing reviews of prominent books of his day.

Wilmot died suddenly of heart disease on 22 February 1942.

== Bibliography ==
- Some Verses (1903) selected poetry
- Some More Verses (1904) selected poetry
- Unconditioned Songs (1913) selected poetry
- Here is Faery (1915) selected poetry drama short stories
- The Bay and Padie Book : Kiddiy Songs (1917) selected children's poetry
- Eyes of Vigilance : divine and moral songs (1920) selected poetry
- Arrows of Longing (1921) selected poetry
- Romance (1922) selected criticism
- Bleat Upon Bleat : a book of verses (1925) selected poetry
- The Gully and Other Verses (1929) selected poetry
- Australian Station Stories (1930) selected short stories
- Melbourne Odes (1934) selected poetry prose
- Five One Act Plays and 'Revolution,' a Four-Act Farce (1939) selected drama
- Poems (1944) selected poetry
- Frank Wilmot : Selected Poetry and Prose (1997) selected poetry prose
