= Philip Holdsworth =

Australian writer, poet and civil servant

Philip Joseph Holdsworth (12 January 1851 – 19 January 1902) was a poet and public servant in colonial New South Wales.

Holdsworth was born in Sydney, the only son of Philip Risby Holdsworth, a respected boatbuilder, and his wife Kate (née Bevan). From 1868 he held a position in the Treasury at Sydney; he later became Secretary to the Forest Department of New South Wales. He devoted his spare time to literature, and in 1885 published a volume of poems entitled, "Station Hunting on the Warrego, and other Poems".

For several years Holdsworth was the Honorary Secretary of the Athenaeum Club of Sydney. He also held the position of editor of the Illustrated Sydney News for a considerable time. He also wrote a "Brief History of Australia," and a large number of poems, articles, and tales for current journals and reviews.

== Death ==
Holdsworth died in Woollahra, New South Wales on 19 January 1902, survived by his wife, Charlotte Emily (née Atkins), whom he wed in Sydney in October 1869, and by his only son.
