= William Gay (poet) =

Australian poet

William Gay (2 May 1865 – 22 December 1897) was a Scottish-born Australian poet. He was born at Bridge of Weir, in Renfrewshire, Scotland, eldest child of William Gay and his wife Jane née Tagg.

Gay edited "The Commonwealth & the Empire" with Mary Sampson.

He died on 22 December 1897.

== Bibliography ==
- Sonnets and Other Verses (1894)
- Sonnets (1896)
- Christ on Olympus and Other Poems (1896)
- Poems of William Gay (1910)
- The Complete Poetical Works of William Gay, and, Purple and Gold : Poems and Lyrics (1913)
