= Arthur Henry Adams =

New Zealand–Australian poet and journalist

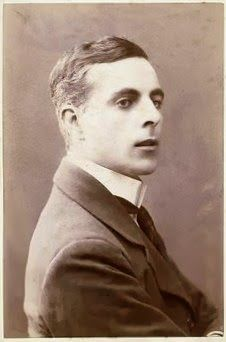
- Arthur Henry Adams
- Born: 6 June 1872; Lawrence, New Zealand
- Died: 4 March 1936 (aged 63); Sydney, New South Wales, Australia
- Education: University of Otago
- Occupations: Journalist; Author; Poet
- Spouse: Lily Paton
- Writing career
- Pen name: James James

Arthur Henry Adams (6 June 1872 – 4 March 1936) was a journalist and author. He started his career in New Zealand, though he spent most of it in Australia, and for a short time lived in China and London.

== Biography ==
Arthur Adams was born in Lawrence, New Zealand, and educated at the University of Otago, where he graduated with a Bachelor of Arts and began studying law. He then abandoned law to become a journalist in Wellington, where he began contributing poetry to The Bulletin, a Sydney periodical. He moved to Sydney in 1898, and took up a position as private secretary and literary advisor to J.C. Williamson, a noted theatrical manager.

In 1900 Adams travelled to China to cover the Boxer Rebellion as a journalist for The Sydney Morning Herald and several New Zealand papers. He would later return to New Zealand before moving to London in 1902, where he published several works including The Nazarene (1902) and London Streets, a collection of poems (1906). Adams returned to Australia in 1906, he took over from A. G. Stephens as editor of the Bulletin's Red Page until 1909.

In addition to his poetry, Adams wrote both plays and novels. His most successful play was Mrs. Pretty and the Premier, which was produced in 1914 by the Melbourne Repertory Theatre.

Adams died of septicaemia and pneumonia on 4 March 1936 in Sydney. He had married Lily Paton in 1908. She and two daughters and a son survived him.

== Works ==
=== Verse ===
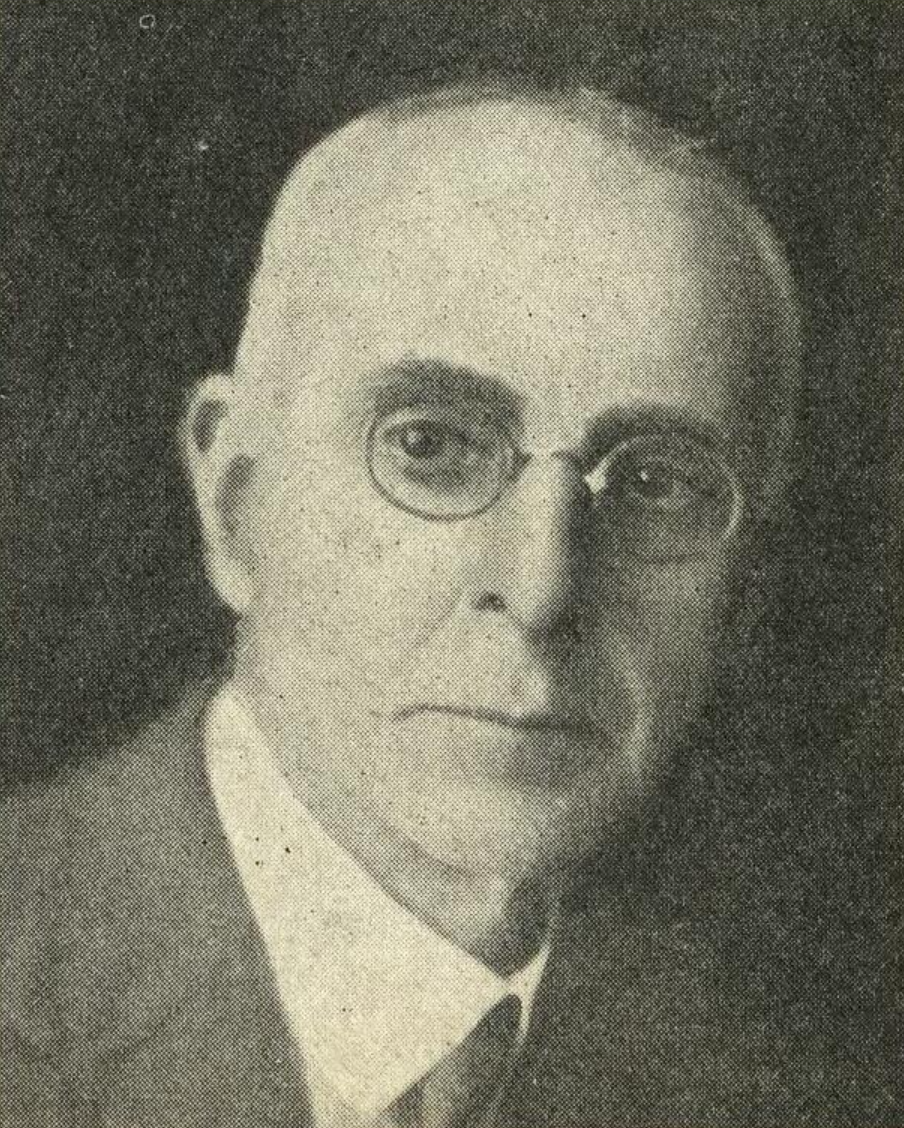
- Adams, undated from The Bulletin
  Maoriland: and Other Verses (1899)
- London Streets (1906)
- Collected Verses of Arthur H. Adams (1913)
- Australian Nursery Rimes (1917)
- Fifty Nursery Rhymes with Music (1924)

=== Prose ===
- The Nazarene: A Study of a Man (1902)
- Tussock Land (1904)
- Galahad Jones (1909), illustrated by Norman Lindsay
- A Touch of Fantasy (1911)
- The Knight and the Motor Launch (1913)
- Three Plays for the Australian Stage (1914)
- Double Bed Dialogues (1915)
- Grocer Greatheart (1915)
- Honeymoon Dialogues (1916), published as James James (pseudonym)
- The Australians (1920)
- Lola of the Chocolates (1929)
- A Man's Life (1929)

=== Plays ===
- Premier and Mrs Pretty (1914)
- Galahad Jones (1910)
- Gallipoli Bill (1914)
- Doctor Death (1920)
- The Tame Cat (1910)
- The Wasters (1910)

=== Music ===
- Evening Bells Waltz (1912)
- Fill The Billy for the Boys with Neville Hampson
- Love is Gold (Lyrics) with music by Leon Caron
