= James Lionel Michael =

Anglo-Australian solicitor and poet

James Lionel Michael (October 1824 – 26 April 1868) was an Anglo-Australian solicitor and poet.
