= James Cuthbertson =

Australian poet (1851–1910)

James Lister Cuthbertson (8 May 1851 – 18 January 1910) was a Scottish-Australian poet and schoolteacher.

== Early life and education ==
James Cuthbertson was born in Glasgow, Scotland, the eldest son of William Gilmour Cuthbertson and his wife, Jane Agnes Cuthbertson (née Lister). James was educated at the secondary school, Trinity College, Glenalmond, Perthshire, where he played on the school cricket team.

== Teaching career ==
In 1875, Cuthbertson joined the staff of the Geelong Grammar School as classical master under the pretense that he had completed his degree at Oxford.

In 1896, Cuthbertson was encouraged to resign his position by the new Head Master Leonard Harford Lindon, who found his erratic behaviour unacceptable, and Cuthbertson agreed to do so. He had enjoyed a close relationship with the students of the school and the former Head Master, John Bracebridge Wilson, however, his alcoholism was well known and boys were placed on "Cuthy duty", which involved at times pulling him out of the gutter.
