= Archibald Strong =

Australian literary scholar

Sir Archibald Strong
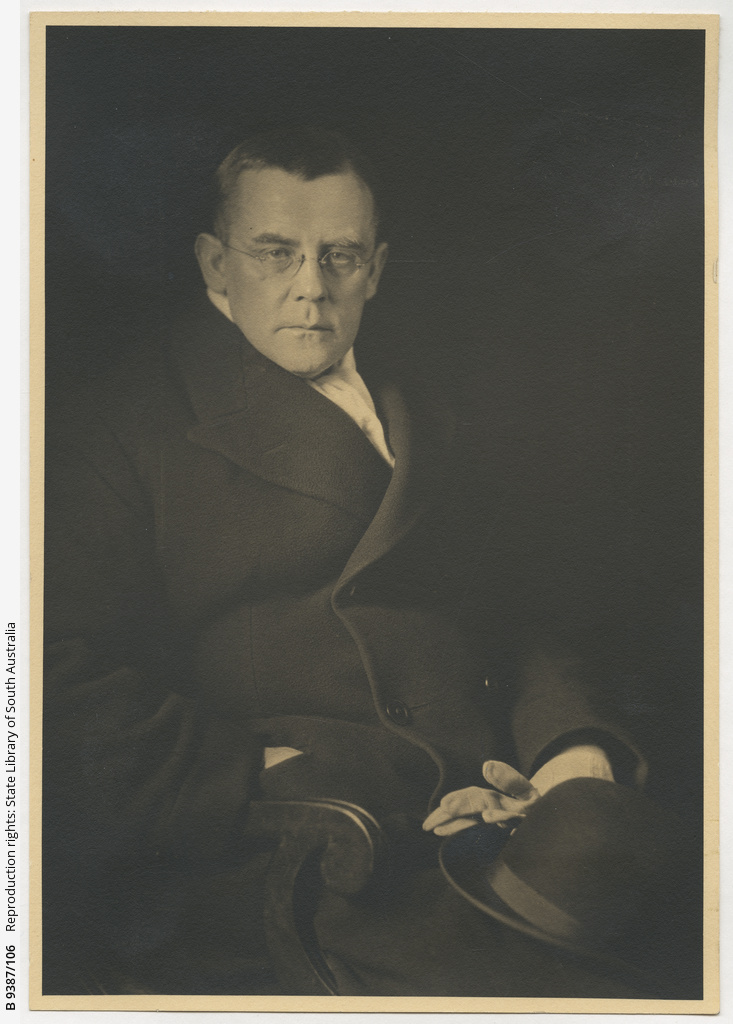
- Born: 30 December 1876; South Yarra, Melbourne
- Died: 2 September 1930 (aged 53); Adelaide, Australia
- Occupations: scholar and poet
- Father: Herbert Strong

Academic background
- Education: Magdalen College, Oxford

Academic work
- Discipline: English language and literature
- Institutions: University of Melbourne; University of Adelaide
- Notable works: Short History of English Literature

Sir Archibald "Archie" Thomas Strong (30 December 1876 – 2 September 1930) was an Australian scholar and poet.

He was Professor of Classics and Lecturer in English at Melbourne University, and Chief Government Censor of Cinematographic Films for the Commonwealth of Australia. He was knighted in the 1925 Birthday Honours.

== Bibliography ==
- Sonnets and Songs (1905) poetry
- Peradventure : Essays in Literary Criticism (1911) prose
- The Ballades of Theodore de Banville (1913) poetry, as translator
- Sonnets of the Empire, Before and During the Great War (1915) poetry
- Poems (1918) poetry
