= Hugh McCrae =

Australian writer

Hugh McCrae OBE
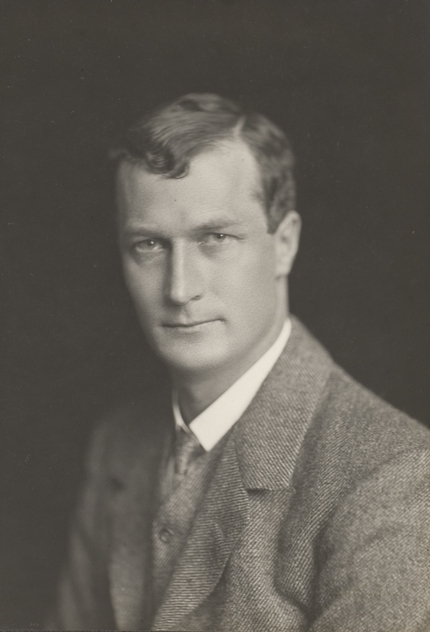
- Hugh McCrae in 1909
- Born: 4 October 1876; Melbourne, Australia
- Died: 17 February 1958 (aged 81)
- Spouse(s): Nancy Adams (m. 1901; died 1943) Janet Le Brun (m. 1946; div. 1948)
- Children: 3, including Mahdi McCrae (artist)
- Father: George Gordon McCrae
- Relatives: Georgiana McCrae (grandmother)

Hugh Raymond McCrae OBE (4 October 1876 – 17 February 1958) was an Australian writer, noted for his poetry.

== Life and career ==
McCrae was born in Melbourne, the son of the Australian author George Gordon McCrae and grandson of the painter and diarist Georgiana McCrae. Originally he trained as an architect, but later took up drawing, writing and acting, settling eventually in Sydney and later in the New South Wales town of Camden. His works are notable for a sense of lightness and delicacy, and he produced, in addition to a volume of memoirs, a considerable body of verse, and a light operetta, an edition of his grandmother's journal, and a volume of prose pieces.

McCrae starred as Australian poet Adam Lindsay Gordon in W. J. Lincoln's 1916 feature film The Life's Romance of Adam Lindsay Gordon, shot in and around Melbourne. In the 1920s, Australian-born composer John Gough set McCrae's poem "Song of the Rain" (from the collection Colombine) to music. McCrae wrote a fantasy play, The Ship of Heaven, which was produced by the Independent Theatre in 1933, for which Alfred Hill composed and conducted the music.

McCrae was well known to a number of distinguished figures in Australian artistic and literary circles. He is remembered for his friendships with Norman Lindsay and Kenneth Slessor, but he was also friendly with such figures as Christopher Brennan and Shaw Neilson. At one time he shared an apartment in New York with Pat Sullivan, the creator of Felix the Cat. When a film about Felix the Cat was being planned, "Sullivan suggested that McCrae should do the drawings while he (Sullivan) supplied the ideas. McCrae refused and has regretted it ever since."

McCrae was awarded the OBE in 1953. Writing after his death in 1958, Mary Gilmore declared that he was Australia's "most outstanding poet", that his poetry "came diamond-like in its perfection of form". "Nothing was too small or too great to attract him," she wrote, adding that "no matter how swallow-like he skims a surface, the deeps are below; he never wrote the shallow." However, he has not retained his critical standing, and is now esteemed mostly as the poet who first offered "an alternative to the balladry that had dominated Australian poetry". Judith Wright called him "a singer, not a thinker, [who] freed the notion of poetry from the portentousness of the Nationalist and radical schools".

== Personal ==
McCrae married Nancy Adams in Melbourne in May 1901, and the couple moved at once to Sydney. They had three daughters, including artist Mahdi McCrae. Nancy died in 1943. He married Janet Le Brun in July 1946, but their marriage was dissolved in 1948. McCrae died in 1958; Dame Mary Gilmore wrote a farewell poem.

== Bibliography ==
- Satyrs and Sunlight (1909)
- Colombine (1920)
- Idyllia (1922)
- The Du Poissey Anecdotes (1922)
- Satyrs and Sunlight (1928; Fanfrolico Press)
- Georgiana's Journal (edited, 1934)
- My Father and My Father's Friends (1935)
- The Mimshi Maiden (1938)
- Poems (1939)
- Forests of Pan (1944)
- Voice of the Forest (1945)
- Story-Book Only (1948)
- The Ship of Heaven (1951)
- The Best Poems of Hugh McCrae (1961)
