= From the Ballads to Brennan =

1964 poetry anthology edited by T. Inglis Moore

- Author: T. Inglis Moore
- Language: English
- Series: Poetry in Australia
- Genre: Poetry anthology
- Publisher: Angus and Robertson
- Publication date: 1964
- Publication place: Australia
- Media type: Print
- Pages: 313 pp.
- Preceded by: -
- Followed by: Modern Australian Verse

From the Ballads to Brennan is an anthology of Australian poetry edited by T. Inglis Moore, published by Angus and Robertson in 1964.

The collection contains 209 poems, from a variety of sources. The contents are separated into five sections: "Folk Songs and Ballads", "The Colonial Age", "Bush Ballads and Popular Verse", "Poets of the Nineties" and "The Early Twentieth Century".

This anthology comprises Volume I of a two-part anthology set titled Poetry in Australia. The second volume, titled Modern Australian Verse was edited by Douglas Stewart and was also published by Angus and Robertson in 1964.

== Contents ==
Folk Songs and Ballads

- "Jim Jones", unknown
- "Botany Bay", unknown
- "The Convict's Lament on the Death of Captain Logan", Francis MacNamara
- "The Waterwitch", unknown
- "The Beautiful Land of Australia", unknown
- "The Old Bullock Dray", unknown
- "The Old Keg of Rum", unknown
- "The Old Bark Hut", unknown
- "The Wild Colonial Boy", unknown
- "Brave Donahue", unknown
- "Look Out Below!", Charles Thatcher
- "The Broken-Down Digger", unknown
- "The Golden Gullies of the Palmer", unknown
- "The Squatter's Farewell, A. D. 1885", 'Anthos'
- "The Eumeralla Shore", unknown
- "Cockies of Bungaree", unknown
- "The Overlander", unknown
- "Down Where the Coolibahs Grow", Horace A. Flower
- "Bullocky Bill", unknown
- "Click Go the Shears", unknown
- "The Banks of the Condamine", unknown
- "On the Road to Gundagai", Anonymous
- "Four Little Johnny-Cakes", unknown
- "Flash Jack from Gundagai", Anonymous
- "Australia's On the Wallaby", unknown
- "Me and My Dog", unknown
- "The Rollicking Ramble-eer", unknown
- "Waltzing Matilda", A. B. Paterson

The Colonial Age

- Extract from "Australasia", William Charles Wentworth
- "Song of the Squatters", Robert Lowe
- Extract from "The Devil and the Governor", William Forster
- "A Mid-Summer Noon in the Australian Forest", Charles Harpur
- "Words", Charles Harpur
- "The Creek of the Four Graves", Charles Harpur
- Extract from "The Tower of the Dream", Charles Harpur
- "A Similitude", Charles Harpur
- Extract from "The Temple of Infamy", Charles Harpur
- Extract from 'The Bright-Eyed' : An Aboriginal Reminiscence", George Gordon McCrae
- "The Sick Stockrider", Adam Lindsay Gordon
- Extract from "The Rhyme of the Joyous", Adam Lindsay Gordon
- "The Dominion", J. Brunton Stephens
- "My Other Chinee Cook", J. Brunton Stephens
- "Orara", Henry Kendall
- "Bell-Birds", Henry Kendall
- "September in Australia", Henry Kendall
- "Beyond Kerguelen", Henry Kendall
- "The Last of His Tribe", Henry Kendall
- "Jim the Splitter", Henry Kendall
- "Faith", Ada Cambridge
- Extract from "On Australian Hills", Ada Cambridge
- "Where the Pelican Builds", Mary Hannay Foott

Bush Ballads and Popular Verse

- "How M'Dougal Topped the Score", Thos. E. Spencer
- "My Mate Bill", Ironbark
- "A Ballad of Queensland", Ironbark
- "A Racing Eight", James Lister Cuthbertson
- "Daley's Dorg Wattle", W. T. Goodge
- "The Man from Snowy River", A. B. Paterson
- "The Man from Ironbark", A. B. Paterson
- "A Bush Christening", A. B. Paterson
- "A Bushman's Song", A. B. Paterson
- "Clancy of the Overflow", A. B. Paterson
- "What the Red-Haired Bo'sun Said", C. H. Souter
- "After Johnson's Dance", C. H. Souter
- "Irish Lords", C. H. Souter
- "Old John Bax", C. H. Souter
- "Cleaning Up", Edward Dyson
- "Where the Dead Men Lie", Barcroft Boake
- "The Ballad of the Drover", Henry Lawson
- "Andy's Gone with Cattle", Henry Lawson
- "Ben Duggan", Henry Lawson
- "The Teams", Henry Lawson
- "The Sliprails and the Spur", Henry Lawson
- "From the Gulf", Will H. Ogilvie
- "The Death of Ben Hall", Will H. Ogilvie
- "Lost and Given Over", E. J. Brady
- "The Coachman's Yarn", E. J. Brady
- "Whalan of Waitin' a While", Jim Grahame
- "Bill the Whaler", Will Lawson
- "The Play", C. J. Dennis
- "Said Hanrahan", John O'Brien
- "Tangmalangaloo", John O'Brien
- "Lofty Lane", 'Trooper Gerardy'
- "West of Alice", W. E. Harney
- "The Bushrangers", Edward Harrington
- "Morgan", Edward Harrington
- "My Old Black Billy", Edward Harrington
- "Red Jack", Mary Durack

Poets of the Nineties

- "In a Wine Cellar", Victor J. Daley
- "Dreams", Victor J. Daley
- "Tamerlane", Victor J. Daley
- "The Ascetic", Victor J. Daley
- Extract from "Night", Victor J. Daley
- Extract from "Narcissus and Some Tadpoles", Victor J. Daley
- "The Women of the West", George Essex Evans
- "Thredbo River", Sydney Jephcott
- "Sunset", Arthur A. D. Bayldon
- "Marlowe", Arthur A. D. Bayldon
- "The Crazy World", William Gay
- "Sea-Grief", Dowell O'Reilly
- Extract from "Young Democracy", Bernard O'Dowd
- "The Cow", Bernard O'Dowd
- Extract from "The Bush", Bernard O'Dowd
- "Australia", Bernard O'Dowd
- Extract from "Alma Venus", Bernard O'Dowd
- "Mopoke", Louis Lavater
- "Faithless", Louis Lavater
- "The Camp Within the West", Roderic Quinn
- "The Fisher", Roderic Quinn
- "Emus", Mary E. Fullerton
- "Lovers", Mary E. Fullerton
- "Lichen", Mary E. Fullerton
- "Lion", Mary E. Fullerton
- "Communa", Mary E. Fullerton
- "Flesh", Mary E. Fullerton
- "Cubes", Mary E. Fullerton
- "Inspiration", Mary E. Fullerton
- Extract from "Dark Rosaleen", David McKee Wright
- "Danny's Wooing", David McKee Wright
- "A Gallop of Fire", Marie E. J. Pitt
- "Towards the Source : 1894-97 : III : 12", Christopher Brennan
- "Towards the Source : 1894-97 : 13", Christopher Brennan
- "The Forest of Night : 1898-1902 : The Twilight of Disquietude : 34", Christopher Brennan
- "The Forest of Night : 1898-1902 : The Twilight of Disquietude : 37", Christopher Brennan
- "The Forest of Night : 1898-1902 : The Quest of Silence : 54", Christopher Brennan
- "The Forest of Night : 1898-1902 : Lilith : 68 (viii)", Christopher Brennan
- "Adam to Lilith (The Forest of Night : 1898-1902 : Lilith : 68 (ix))", Christopher Brennan
- "Lilith of the Fate of Man", Christopher Brennan
- "The Forest of Night : 1898-1902 : Interlude: The Casement : 71", Christopher Brennan
- "How Old is My Heart (The Wanderer : 1902- : 91)", Christopher Brennan
- "The Wanderer : 1902- : 94", Christopher Brennan
- "The Wanderer : 1902- : 95", Christopher Brennan
- "The Wanderer : 1902- : 98", Christopher Brennan
- "The Wanderer : 1902- : 99", Christopher Brennan
- "O Said, This Misery Must End I Said This Misery Must End (Pauca [Pavca] Mea : 103)", Christopher Brennan

The Early Twentieth Century

- "Buffalo Creek", J. Le Gay Brereton
- "Song Be Delicate", John Shaw Neilson
- "Love's Coming", John Shaw Neilson
- "Beauty Imposes", John Shaw Neilson
- "The Break of Day", John Shaw Neilson
- "Strawberries in November", John Shaw Neilson
- "The Orange Tree", John Shaw Neilson
- "To a School-girl", John Shaw Neilson
- "May", John Shaw Neilson
- "'Tis the White Plum Tree", John Shaw Neilson
- "The Poor Can Feed the Birds", John Shaw Neilson
- "To a Blue Flower", John Shaw Neilson
- "The Crane Is My Neighbour", John Shaw Neilson
- "The Sundowner", John Shaw Neilson
- "The Cool, Cool Country", John Shaw Neilson
- "The Australian", Arthur H. Adams
- "The Skylark's Nest", R. H. Long
- "Poet and Peasant", R. H. Long
- "Colombine", Hugh McCrae
- "Muse-Haunted", Hugh McCrae
- "I Blow My Pipes", Hugh McCrae
- "Ambuscade", Hugh McCrae
- "Mad Marjory", Hugh McCrae
- "The Uncouth Knight", Hugh McCrae
- "Joan of Arc (Introduction)", Hugh McCrae
- "June Morning", Hugh McCrae
- "Evening", Hugh McCrae
- "Song of the Rain", Hugh McCrae
- "Enigma", Hugh McCrae
- "The Mouse", Hugh McCrae
- "Camden Magpie", Hugh McCrae
- "The Shearer's Wife", Louis Esson
- "The Reaper", L. H. Allen
- "The Cicada", H. M. Green
- Extract from "Life's Testament", William Baylebridge
- "Love Redeemed : XXXII", William Baylebridge
- "Love Redeemed : LXXXII", William Baylebridge
- "Love Redeemed : LXXXVIII", William Baylebridge
- "My Country", Dorothea Mackellar
- "Dusk in the Domain", Dorothea Mackellar
- "The Mother", Nettie Palmer
- "The Farmer Remembers the Somme", Vance Palmer
- "Desert Claypan", Frederick T. Macartney
- Extract from "Elegy on an Australian Schoolboy", Zora Cross
- "Song of the Captured Woman", James Devaney
- "The Evening Gleam", James Devaney
- "Mortality", James Devaney
- "Artemis", Dulcie Deamer
- "Beauty and Terror", Lesbia Harford
- "Revolution", Lesbia Harford
- "Day's End", Lesbia Harford
- "Experience", Lesbia Harford
- "He Had Served Eighty Masters", Lesbia Harford
- "Tree Wisdom", Lesbia Harford
- "He Could Have Found His Way", Kathleen Dalziel
- "Anzac Cove", Leon Gellert
- "In the Trench", Leon Gellert
- "These Men", Leon Gellert
- "The Jester in the Trench", Leon Gellert
- "Budding Spring", Jack Lindsay
- "Fine Clay", Winifred Maitland Shaw
- "Eve-Song", Mary Gilmore
- "Never Admit the Pain", Mary Gilmore
- "Nurse No Long Grief", Mary Gilmore
- "The Baying Hounds", Mary Gilmore
- "From Swans at Night", Mary Gilmore
- "Old Botany Bay", Mary Gilmore
- "The Shepherd", Mary Gilmore
- "The Myall in Prison", Mary Gilmore
- "The Waradgeri Tribe", Mary Gilmore
- "The Song of the Woman-Drawer", Mary Gilmore
- Extract from "The Disinherited", Mary Gilmore
- "The Pear Tree", Mary Gilmore
- "The Tenancy", Mary Gilmore
- "Nationality", Mary Gilmore

== Publication history ==
The anthology was re-issued as follows:

- 1965 University of California Press, USA
- 1971 Angus and Robertson, Australia

== Critical reception ==
Reviewing the anthology for The Bulletin R. A. Simpson found both good and bad in the selections. "The volume has been well planned in terms of contrasts. The 'academic' and 'popular' traditions are balanced satisfactorily against each other. It is a democratic and crowded collection, and it captures the growing pains of a country’s literature. Some of the humor remains humor today and there is a spattering of real poetry, as well as the poems and parts of poems that continue to be embarrassing skeletons in the literary cupboard regardless of the fact that Professor T. Inglis Moore has worked hard to give the skeletons respectable clothing."

A reviewer in The Sydney Morning Herald commented that the "selection in each group has been made with scholarly discrimination but with an eye to the general reader as much as to the poetry lover. All the old folk songs and ballads are here." They concluded by calling this "the most ambitious of Australian anthologies".

== See also ==
- 1964 in Australian literature
