= 1918 in poetry =

Nationality words link to articles with information on the nation's poetry or literature (for instance, Irish or France).

== Events ==
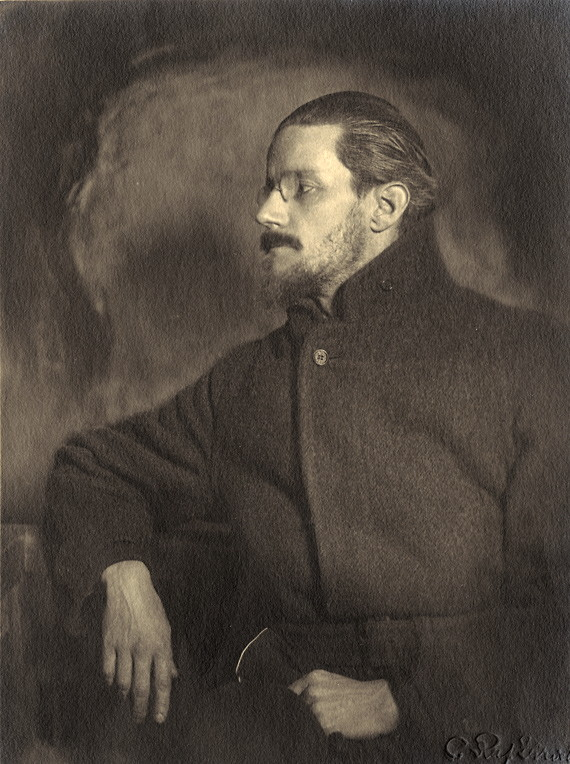
James Joyce in 1918

- January 23 — English poet Robert Graves marries the painter Nancy Nicholson in London. Wedding guests include Wilfred Owen, who will be killed by the end of the year, and whose first nationally published poem appears 3 days later ("Miners" in The Nation).
- April — Hu Shih, chief advocate of the revolution in Chinese literature at this time, publishes an essay, "Constructive Literary Revolution - A Literature of National Speech" in New Youth proposing a four-point reform program.
- June — English poet Basil Bunting is imprisoned as a conscientious objector.
- August 17 — English poets Wilfred Owen and Siegfried Sassoon meet for the last time, in London, and spend what Sassoon later describes as "the whole of a hot cloudless afternoon together."
- November 4 — English war poet Wilfred Owen is killed in action, aged 25, at the Sambre–Oise Canal with only five of his poems published. News of his death reaches his parents in Oswestry a week later on Armistice Day.

And each slow dusk a drawing-down of blinds.

—Closing line of "Anthem for Doomed Youth" by Wilfred Owen

- December — The Poems of Gerard Manley Hopkins (d. 1889; including The Wreck of the Deutschland, 1875/6) are published by his friend Robert Bridges; few were published in Hopkins's lifetime, so this presents his innovative sprung rhythm and imagery to many readers for the first time.

== Works published in English ==
=== Australia ===
- Christopher Brennan, A Chant of Doom and Other Verses
- Zora Cross, The Lilt of Life
- C. J. Dennis:
  - Digger Smith
  - Backblock Ballads and Later Verses
- Mary Gilmore, The Passionate Heart
- Walter Murdoch, The Oxford Book of Australasian Verse
- John Shaw Neilson, "The Break of Day"
- David McKee Wright, An Irish Heart

=== Canada ===
- Marie Joussaye, Selections from Anglo-Saxon Songs.
- Wilson MacDonald, The Song Of The Prairie Land and Other Poems. Albert E. S. Smythe intr., Toronto: McClelland & Stewart.

=== India in English ===
- The Bengali Writers of English Verse: A Record and an Appreciation, Calcutta: Thacker, Spink & Co., 1918.; London: Longmans, Green and Co., 119 pages; anthology; Indian poetry in English, published in the United Kingdom
- Harindranath Chattopadhyaya, The Feast of Youth, Madras: Theosophical Publishing House; India, Indian poetry in English
- Baldoon Dhingra, Symphony of Love, Cambridge: Bowes and Bowes; Indian poet, writing in English, published in the United Kingdom
- Theodore Douglas Dunn, editor, The Bengali Book of English Verse, Bombay: Longmans, Green and Co.; anthology; Indian poetry in English

=== United Kingdom ===
- Marian Allen, The Wind on the Downs
- Laurence Binyon, The New World: Poems
- Vera Brittain, Verses of a VAD
- Rupert Brooke (died on active service 1915), The Collected Poems of Rupert Brooke
- Émile Cammaerts, Messines and other Poems, Belgian-born poet writing in English
- Walter de la Mare, Motley, and Other Poems
- Baldoon Dhingra, Symphony of Love, Cambridge: Bowes and Bowes; Indian poet, writing in English, published in the United Kingdom
- Eleanor Farjeon, Sonnets and Poems
- Wilfrid Gibson, Whin
- Oliver St. John Gogarty, The Ship, and Other Poems
- Helen Hamilton, Napoo!
- A. P. Herbert, The Bomber Gipsy, and Other Poems
- Gerard Manley Hopkins (died 1889), Poems of Gerard Manley Hopkins
- C. Morton Horne ("killed in action January 27, 1916"), Songs of the Shrapnel Shell, and Other Verse, Irish poet published simultaneously in the United States and United Kingdom
- Ford Madox Hueffer, On Heaven, and Poems written on active service
- Aldous Huxley, The Defeat of Youth, and Other Poems
- Geoffrey Studdert Kennedy, Rough Rhymes of a Padre
- D. H. Lawrence, New Poems
- Bertram Lloyd, ed., Poems Written During the Great War, 1914–1918
- Ewart Alan Mackintosh (killed in action 1917), War, The Liberator, and Other Pieces, Scottish poet
- Terence MacSwiney, Battle-cries, Irish poet
- Susan Miles, Dunch
- Margaret Postgate, Margaret Postgate's Poems
- Morley Roberts, War Lyrics
- Siegfried Sassoon, Counter-Attack and Other Poems
- Fredegond Shove, Dreams and Journeys
- Dora Sigerson (died January 6), The Sad Years and Other Poems, Irish poet resident in London
- Edith Sitwell, Clowns' Houses
- Sacheverell Sitwell, The People's Palace
- Geoffrey Bache Smith (died of wounds 1916), A Spring Harvest (edited with preface by J. R. R. Tolkien)
- J. C. Squire, Poems, First Series
- Edward Thomas (killed in action April 9), Last Poems
- Katharine Tynan, Herb o' Grace, poems in war-time
- Arthur Waley, editor and translator, One Hundred and Seventy Chinese Poems, anthology
- W. B. Yeats, Nine Poems, Irish poet published in the United Kingdom

=== United States ===
- Conrad Aiken, The Charnel Rose, Senlin: A Biography, and Other Poems
- Sherwood Anderson, Mid-American Chants
- Stephen Vincent Benét, Young Adventure
- John Gould Fletcher, The Tree of Life
- Amy Lowell, Can Grande's Castle
- Edgar Lee Masters, Toward the Gulf
- Charles Reznikoff, Rhythms, his first book of poetry, a small volume, self-published
- Lola Ridge, The Ghetto and Other Poems
- Carl Sandburg, Cornhuskers, Holt, Rinehart and Winston
- Wallace Stevens, "Le Monocle de Mon Oncle" is first published (it will later be included in his first poetry book, Harmonium.

=== Other in English ===
- Fernando Pessoa, Portuguese poet writing in English published in Portugal
  - Antinous
  - 35 Sonnets
- W. B. Yeats, Nine Poems, Irish poet published in the United Kingdom

== Works published in other languages ==
=== France ===
- Guillaume Apollinaire, pen name of Wilhelm Apollinaris de Kostrowitzky, Calligrammes, France
- Jean Cocteau, Le Cap de Bonne Espérance, about the author's experience as a trapeze artist, written in vers brisés
- Henri de Régnier, 1914–1916: poésies
- Max Jacob, Le Cornet à Dès
- Oscar Vladislas de Lubicz-Milosz, also known as O. V. de L. Milosz, Adramandoni
- Pierre Reverdy,
  - Les Ardoises du toit
  - Les Jockeys camouflés
- Tristan Tzara, pen name of Sami Rosenstock, Vingt-cinq poèmes

=== Germany ===
- Kurd Adler, Wiederkehr: Gedichte
- Wilhelm Runge, Das Denken träumt

=== Spanish language ===
- Gerardo Diego, El romancero de la novia ("The Bride's Ballads"), Spain
- Federico García Lorca, Impressiones y paisajes ("Impressions and Landscapes"), Spain
- César Vallejo, Los heraldos negros ("The Black Heralds") the author's first book is "a bitter interpretation of provincial life" which "represented a break with symbolism and had a profound effect upon contemporary poetry in Peru

=== Other languages ===
- Deva Kanta Barua, Sagar dekhisa, Indian, Assamese language
- Aleksandr Blok, The Twelve (Russian: Двенадцать, Dvenadtsat), a controversial long poem, one of the first poetic responses to Russia's 1917 October Revolution
- António Botto, Cantigas de Saudade, Portugal
- Miloš Crnjanski, Лирика Итаке ("Lyrics of Ithaca"), Serbian Cyrillic
- Aaro Hellaakoski, Nimettömiä lauluja, Finland
- Shmuel Yankev Imber, ed. Inter arma: a zamlung lirik (Inter Arma: a collection of lyrics), Yiddish, Austria
- Sir Muhammad Iqbal, Rumuz-e-Bekhudi (The Secrets of Selflessness) published in Persian, his second philosophical poetry book
- Augusta Peaux, Gedichten, Netherlands
- Pavlo Tychyna, Clarinets of the Sun , Ukraine

== Births ==
Death years link to the corresponding "[year] in poetry" article:

- February 1 – Muriel Spark (died 2006), Scottish novelist and poet
- February 17 – William Bronk (died 1999), American poet
- April 15 – Louis Coxe (died 1993), American poet
- April 23 – James Kirkup (died 2009), English poet, translator and travel writer
- May 10 – Jane Mayhall (died 2009), American poet and novelist
- May 21 – Gopal Prasad Rimal (died 1973), Indian, Nepali-language poet and playwright
- July 9 – John Heath-Stubbs (died 2006), English poet and translator
- August 23 – Vinda Karandikar, also known as C. V. Karandikar (died 2010), Indian, Marathi-language poet, critic and translator
- August 31 – Shimizu Motoyoshi 清水基吉 (died 2008), Japanese Shōwa and Heisei period novelist and poet (surname: Shimizu)
- September 30 – Gevorg Emin Գևորգ Էմին (died 1998), Armenian
- November 14 – Valentin Iremonger (died 1991), Irish poet and diplomat
- November 16 – Nicholas Moore (died 1986), English poet, associated with the New Apocalyptics in the 1940s, who later drops out of the literary world
- November 18 – İlhan Berk (died 2008), Turkish poet
- November 19 – W. S. Graham (died 1986), Scottish poet often associated with Dylan Thomas and the neo-romantic poets
- December 8 – Hans Børli (died 1989), Norwegian poet, novelist and writer
- December 30 – Al Purdy (died 2000), popular Canadian poet

=== Date unknown ===
- Abd an-Nabi Abd al-Qadir Mursal, Sudanese poet and politician (died 1962)
- M. Gopalakrishna Adiga (died 1992), Indian, Kannada-language poet often said to be the pioneer of the "navya" (modernist) literary movement in Karnataka
- Indra Dev Bhojvani, also known as "Indur", Indian, Sindhi-language
- Ram Narain Singh Dardi, Indian, Punjabi-language poet who wrote in the Lahndi dialect
- Siddayya Puranika, Indian, Kannada-language poet
- Amritdhari Singha, Indian, Maithili-language writer, philosopher and poet

== Deaths ==
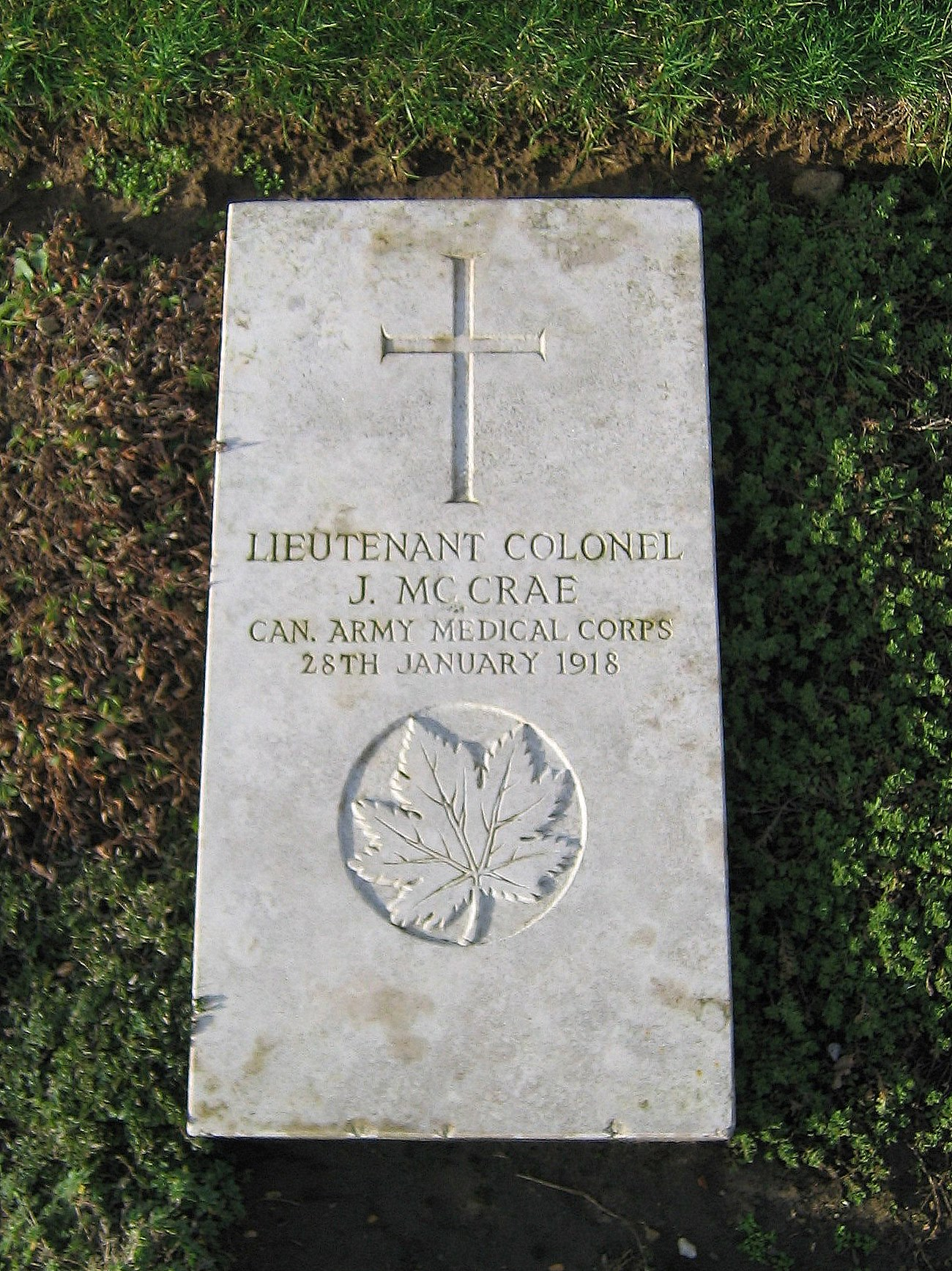
John McCrae's grave at Wimereux cemetery

Note two subsections, below. Birth years link to the corresponding "[year] in poetry" article:

- January 1 – Wilfred Campbell (born c.1860), Canadian poet
- January 6 – Dora Sigerson (born 1866), Irish poet
- June 10 – Arrigo Boito (born 1842), Italian poet, journalist, novelist and composer
- June 26 – Peter Rosegger (born 1843), Austrian poet
- September 18 – Saul Adadi (born 1850), Libyan Sephardi Jewish hakham, rosh yeshiva and writer of piyyutim
- September 21 — Emily Julian McManus (born 1865), Canadian poet, author, and educator
- October 12 – Mary Hannay Foott (born 1846), Australian poet
- c. November (probable date) – Arthur Cravan (born 1887), Swiss-born Francophone literary editor, poet and boxer, presumed lost at sea
- December 23 – Thérèse Schwartze (born 1851), Dutch portrait painter and poet
- Also:
  - A. R. Raja Raja Varma (born 1863), Indian, Malayalam-language poet, grammarian, scholar, critic and writer; nephew of Kerala Varma Valiya Koil Thampuran
  - Balakavi, pen name of Tryambak Bapuji Thomare (born 1890), Indian, Marathi-language poet; died in a train accident
  - Gobinda Rath (born 1848), Indian, Oriya-language poet and satirist
  - Govind Vasudev Kanitkar (born 1854), Indian, Marathi-language poet and translator

=== Killed in World War I ===
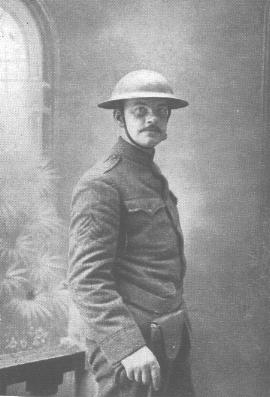
Sgt. Joyce Kilmer, American poet and a member of the 69th Volunteer Infantry Unit

- January 28 – John McCrae (born 1872), Canadian poet, author of "In Flanders Fields" and lieutenant colonel serving as a field surgeon in the war, from pneumonia
- April 1 – Isaac Rosenberg (born 1890), English war poet, killed in Fampoux in the Somme at dawn (there is a dispute as to whether his death occurred at the hands of a sniper or in close combat); first buried in a mass grave, but in 1926, his remains are identified and reinterred at Bailleul Road East Cemetery Plot V, St. Laurent-Blangy, Pas de Calais, France
- 16 April - John Munro (Iain Rothach) (born 1889), Scottish Gaelic poet, killed serving with the Seaforth Highlanders
- 19 April - William Hope Hodgson (born 1887, British poet and Weird fiction writer, killed by artillery in Fourth Battle of Ypres.
- July 30 – Joyce Kilmer (born 1886), American, killed in Second Battle of the Marne in France after volunteering to join Major William "Wild Bill" Donovan's First Battalion to lead the day's attack; while scouting, Kilmer is shot in the head near the village of Seringes; posthumously awarded the Croix de Guerre
- November 4 – Wilfred Owen (born 1893), English war poet, killed in action in France (see Events above)
- See also Guillaume Apollinaire below

=== Died in the 1918 flu pandemic ===
- October 21 – E. J. Luce (born 1881), Jèrriais poet and journalist
- November 9 – Guillaume Apollinaire (born 1880), French language poet, writer and art critic credited with coining the word surrealism, dies two years after being wounded in World War I and still vulnerable from his injury
- December 2 – Edmond Rostand (born 1868), French poet and dramatist

== Awards and honors ==
- Pulitzer Prize for Poetry: Sara Teasdale: Love Songs

== See also ==
- List of years in poetry
- Dada
- Imaginism movement in Russian poetry
- Modernist poetry in English
- Silver Age of Russian Poetry
- Young Poland (Polish: Młoda Polska) modernist period in Polish arts and literature
- Poetry
