= 1918 in Australian literature =

This article presents a list of the historical events and publications of Australian literature during 1918.

== Events ==
- 18 January – The first edition of Aussie: The Australian Soldiers' Magazine appears.

== Books ==
- J. H. M. Abbott — Sally : The Tale of a Currency Lass
- Mary Grant Bruce — Dick
- May Gibbs
  - Snugglepot and Cuddlepie: Their Adventures Wonderful
  - Wattle Babies
- G. B. Lancaster — The Savignys
- Norman Lindsay — The Magic Pudding
- Steele Rudd — Memoirs of Corporal Keeley
- Lindsay Russell — Earthware
- Ethel Turner — St. Tom and the Dragon

== Poetry ==
- Christopher Brennan — A Chant of Doom and Other Verses
- Zora Cross
  - The City of Riddle-Me-Ree
  - The Lilt of Life
- C. J. Dennis
  - "The Battle of the Wazzir"
  - Digger Smith
- Mary Gilmore – The Passionate Heart
- Henry Lawson — Selected Poems of Henry Lawson
- Grace Ethel Martyr — Afterwards and Other Verses
- Myra Morris — England and Other Verses
- Walter Murdoch — The Oxford Book of Australasian Verse
- John Shaw Neilson — "The Break of Day"
- A. B. Paterson
  - "Moving On"
  - "Swinging the Lead"
- David McKee Wright — An Irish Heart

== Births ==
A list, ordered by date of birth (and, if the date is either unspecified or repeated, ordered alphabetically by surname) of births in 1918 of Australian literary figures, authors of written works or literature-related individuals follows, including year of death.

- 19 January – Eric Lambert, novelist (died 1966)
- 26 January — Amy Witting, novelist (died 2001)
- 10 July — James Aldridge, novelist (died 2015)
- 16 September — Nan Hunt, Australian children's writer who also wrote as N. L. Ray (died 2015)

== Deaths ==
A list, ordered by date of death (and, if the date is either unspecified or repeated, ordered alphabetically by surname) of deaths in 1918 of Australian literary figures, authors of written works or literature-related individuals follows, including year of birth.

- 28 April — Albert Robert Blackmore, poet (born 1886)
- 12 October — Mary Hannay Foott, poet (born 1846)
- 16 December — E. W. Cole, bookseller and publisher (born 1832)

== See also ==
- 1918 in Australia
- 1918 in literature
- 1918 in poetry
- List of years in Australian literature
- List of years in literature
