= Beauty Imposes =

1938 poem by John Shaw Neilson

- by John Shaw Neilson
- First published in: Beauty Imposes : Some Recent Verse
- Country: Australia
- Language: English
- Publication date: 1938
- Lines: 9

Full text
- Beauty Imposes at Wikisource

"Beauty Imposes" is a poem by Australian poet John Shaw Neilson.

It was first published in the poet's collection Beauty Imposes : Some Recent Verse in 1938, and later in the poet's collections and other Australian poetry anthologies.

== Further publications ==
- An Anthology of Australian Verse edited by George Mackaness, Angus & Robertson, 1952
- Shaw Neilson edited by Judith Wright, Angus and Robertson, 1963
- From the Ballads to Brennan edited by T. Inglis Moore, Angus & Robertson, 1964
- The Penguin Book of Australian Verse edited by Harry Heseltine, Penguin Books, 1972
- Australia's Writers edited by Graeme Kinross-Smith, Nelson Books, 1980
- The Illustrated Treasury of Australian Verse edited by Beatrice Davis, Nelson, 1984
- My Country : Australian Poetry and Short Stories, Two Hundred Years edited by Leonie Kramer, Lansdowne, 1985
- John Shaw Neilson : Poetry, Autobiography and Correspondence edited by Cliff Hanna, University of Queensland Press, 1991
- Selected Poems by John Shaw Neilson, Angus and Robertson, 1993
- Two Centuries of Australian Poetry edited by Kathrine Bell, Gary Allen, 2007
- Collected Verse of John Shaw Neilson edited by Margaret Roberts, UWA Publishing, 2012

== Notes ==
In a letter sent to James Devaney on 20 January 1936 Neilson described this poem as "an attempt to describe in a few lines the thing that so many rhymers tackle. Beauty does create in us a strange wonderment and awe. It is difficult to describe in words the effect that a beautiful nude has upon one's feelings."

== See also ==
- 1938 in poetry
- 1938 in literature
- 1938 in Australian literature
- Australian literature
