= 1938 in poetry =

Nationality words link to articles with information on the nation's poetry or literature (for instance, Irish or France).

== Events ==
- In Nazi Germany the Reichsschrifttumskammer (the National Socialist authors' association) bans German expressionist poet Gottfried Benn from further writing.
- The Arbujad ("Soothsayers") group of Estonian poets forms.

== Works published in English ==
=== Australia ===
- R. D. Fitzgerald, Moonlight Acre, Melbourne, Melbourne University Press
- Rex Ingamells and Ian Tilbrook, Conditional Culture, published in Adelaide; a manifesto advocating a "fundamental break ... with the spirit of English culture" to free Australian art from "alien influences" and paying more attention to Aboriginal culture as well as the use of "only such imagery as is truly Australian"; the word "Jindyworobak", which they understood to be an Aboriginal term meaning 'to annex' or 'to join', they proposed as a symbol of the reorientation; the Jindyworobak Movement resulted in at least 44 volumes of poetry and literary comment in addition to periodicals from this year through 1953; criticism
- Rex Ingamells:
  - Sun-freedom, Adelaide
  - Editor, Jindyworobak Anthology, Adelaide
- Shaw Neilson, Beauty Imposes: Some Recent Verse, Angus & Robertson

=== Canada ===
- Kenneth Leslie, By Stubborn Stars. Toronto: Ryerson. Governor-General's Award 1938.
- L. A. MacKay, Viper's Bugloss.
- Virna Sheard, Leaves in the Wind.
- Arthur Stringer, The Old Woman Remembers and Other Irish Poems. Indianapolis: Bobbs-Merrill.

=== India, in English ===
- Joseph Furtado, Songs in Exile ( Poetry in English ), Bombay: self-published
- Cyril Modak, editor, The Indian Gateway to Poetry ( Poetry in English ), Calcutta: Longmans, Green; anthology
- K. S. R. Sastry, The Light of Life ( Poetry in English )

=== United Kingdom ===
- Elizabeth Daryush, Verses: Sixth Book
- Cecil Day-Lewis, Overtures to Death, and Other Poems
- Walter de la Mare, Memory, and Other Poems
- David Gascoyne, Holderlin's Madness
- Stella Gibbons, The Lowland Venus, and Other Poems
- Oliver St. John Gogarty, Others to Adorn, preface by W. B. Yeats
- Poems of Today, British poetry anthology, third series
- Robert Graves, Collected Poems
- Louis MacNeice:
  - The Earth Compels
  - I Crossed the Minch, prose, with verse
- Stevie Smith, Tender Only to One
- Charles Williams, Taliessen Through Logres
- W. B. Yeats, New Poems, including "Lapis Lazuli", Irish poet published in the United Kingdom

=== United States ===
- Cleanth Brooks and Robert Penn Warren, editors, Understanding Poetry, criticism and anthology, (appearing thereafter in revised editions to 1976)
- E. E. Cummings, Collected Poems
- Donald Davidson, Lee in the Mountains
- Kenneth Fearing, Dead Reckoning
- John Gould Fletcher, Selected Poems
- Archibald MacLeish, Land of the Free
- Ogden Nash, I'm a Stranger Here Myself
- Ezra Pound, Guide to Kulchur, dedicated "To Louis Zukofsky and Basil Bunting strugglers in the desert"
- Frederic Prokosch, The Carnival
- Laura Riding, Collected Poems
- Muriel Rukeyser, U.S. 1
- Delmore Schwartz, In Dreams Begin Responsibilities
- E. B. White, The Fox of Peapack
- William Carlos Williams, The Complete Collected Poems of William Carlos Williams, 1906-1938, New Directions

=== Other in English ===
- Austin Clarke, Night and Morning, Irish poet published in Ireland
- A. R. D. Fairburn, Dominion, New Zealand poet
- Robin Hyde, New Zealand:
  - Nor the Years Condemn
  - The Godwits Fly
- Ewart Milne, Forty North Fifty West, Irish poet published in Ireland
- W. B. Yeats, New Poems, including "Lapis Lazuli", Irish poet published in the United Kingdom

== Works published in other languages ==
=== France ===
- Paul Éluard, pen name of Paul-Eugène Grindel, Cours naturel
- Pierre Emmanuel, pen name of Noël Mathieu, Christ au tombeau, the author's first poem
- Luc Estang, Au-delà de moi-même
- Pierre Jean Jouve, Kyrie
- Jules Supervielle, La Fable du monde

=== Indian subcontinent ===
Including all of the British colonies that later became India, Pakistan, Bangladesh, Sri Lanka and Nepal. Listed alphabetically by first name, regardless of surname:

- Ajit Kumar Datta, Patal Kanya, Bengali
- Bharatidasan, Paratitacan Kavitakal, Tamil
- Daya Singh Arif, Zindagi Bilas, a long poem, Punjabi
- Sir Muhammad Iqbal, Armaghan-i-Hijaz ("Gift from Hijaz"), philosophical poetry book in Persian
- Rabindranath Tagore, Prantik, Bengali
- Ramnarayan Vishvanath Pathak, Gujarati:
  - Sesnan Kavyo, 73 Gujarati poems, including sonnets, bhajans and muktaks
  - Arvacin Kavyasahityanan Vaheno, five lectures on modern Gujarati poetry
- Rayaprolu Subba Rao, Ramyalokam, this verse work in Telugu "is accepted as the manifesto of bhava kavita (romantic poetry)", according to academic Siser Kumar Das
- Sacchidananda Rout Roy, Baji Raut ("The Boatman Boy"), Indian, Oriya-language
- Sumitranandan Pant, Yugvani, Hindi
- Ubaidullah Mahshar and Ashfaq Husain Khan Gaurakhpuri, Yadgar-i Mahshar, Urdu
- Mehr Lal Soni Zia Fatehabadi, Zia Ke Sau Sher (A Hundred Verses of Zia) - Collection of quotes published by Gajender Lal Soni, Mohan Building, near Lloyd's Bank, Delhi in 1938.Urdu

=== Other languages ===
- Nathan Alterman, Stars Outside, Israel
- Heinrich Anacker, Ein Volk – ein Reich – ein Führer, Munich: Eher-Verlag, Nazi Germany
- Nikos Kazantzakis, The Odyssey: A Modern Sequel, Greece
- Kersti Merilaas, Maantee tuuled, Estonia
- Gabriela Mistral, Tala ("Harvesting"), Buenos Aires: Sur; Chilean poet published in Argentina
- María Pemán, Poema de la bestia y el angel ("Poem of the Beast and the Angel"); Spain
- Emil Staiger, Die Zeit als Einbildungskraft des Dichters, Germany (scholarship)
- Tin Ujević, Skalpel kaosa ("Scalpel of Chaos"), Croatia
- Xavier Villaurrutia, Nostalgia de la muerte, Mexico

== Awards and honors ==
- Hawthornden Prize: David Jones for In Parenthesis
- Newdigate Prize: Michael Thwaites
- Pulitzer Prize for Poetry: Marya Zaturenska: Cold Morning Sky
- Governor General's Award, poetry or drama: By Stubborn Stars, Kenneth Leslie
- Rugby School poetry prize: John Gillespie Magee, Jr.

== Births ==
Death years link to the corresponding "[year] in poetry" article:

- January 13 – Nabaneeta Dev Sen (died 2019), Bengali writer and poet
- January 21 – Julia Fields, African American
- February 13 – Frances Horovitz (died 1983), English poet, broadcaster and performer of poetry
- February 18 – Elke Erb, German
- February 22
  - Ishmael Reed, American poet, essayist and novelist
  - George Thaniel (died 1991), Greek poet and classical scholar working in Canada
- March 18 – Michael S. Harper (died 2016), African American
- March 24 – Ian Hamilton (died 2001), English literary critic, reviewer, biographer, poet, magazine editor and publisher
- April 18 – Jwalamukhi జ్వాలాముఖీ, pen name of Veeravalli Raghavacharyulu (died 2008), Indian, Telugu-language poet, novelist, writer and political activist
- May 9 – Charles Simic, American
- May 11 – Joan Margarit (died 2021), Catalan Spanish poet and architect
- May 25 – Raymond Carver (died 1988), American short-story writer and poet
- June 1 – Khawar Rizvi (died 1981), Pakistani poet, scholar
- June 13 – John Newlove (died 2003), Canadian
- July 19
  - Dom Moraes (died 2004), Indian writer, poet and columnist
  - Tom Raworth (died 2017), English poet and visual artist; influential figure in the British Poetry Revival movement
- August 10 – Momoko Kuroda, 黒田杏子, Japanese haiku poet and essayist
- August 21 – Peter Dale, English poet and translator
- August ? – Deena Linett, American
- September 2 – Carlo Bordini (died 2020), Italian
- September 16 – Betty Adcock, American
- September 17 – H. H. ter Balkt (died 2015), Dutch
- September 19 – Keorapetse Kgositsile (died 2018), South African
- September 22 – Tajal Bewas, pen name of Taj Mohammed Samoo (died 2008), bucolic Sufi poet, novelist, short-story writer, teacher and Pakistani government official
- October 9 – Gwendoline Konie (died 2009), Zambian poet and politician
- October 13 – Askia M. Touré, African American
- October 17 – Les Murray (died 2019), Australian
- October 23 – R. F. Langley (died 2011), English
- November 7 – LeRoy Clarke (died 2021), Trinidadian poet and visual artist
- November 12 – Belal Chowdhury (died 2018), Bangladeshi
- Also:
  - Brendan Galvin, American
  - Alan Jackson, English-born Scottish
  - Robert Phillips, American poet and academic
  - Sansei Yamao (died 2001), Japanese poet and friend of American poet Gary Snyder

== Deaths ==
Birth years link to the corresponding "[year] in poetry" article:

- March 1 – Gabriele D'Annunzio (born 1863), Italian poet, writer, novelist, dramatist, soldier, political figure and daredevil
- March 10 – Angiolo Silvio Novaro (born 1866), Italian poet and children's writer
- March 31 – Willem Kloos (born 1859), Dutch poet and critic
- April 15 – César Vallejo (born 1892), Peruvian poet
- April 19 – Sir Henry Newbolt (born 1862), English author and poet
- April 21 – Sir Muhammad Iqbal (aka "Allama Iqbal" [Urdu] and "Iqbal-e-Lahori" [Persian]; born 1877), Indian Muslim poet, philosopher and politician, writing in Persian and Urdu, praised as Muffakir-e-Pakistan ("The Thinker of Pakistan"), Shair-i-Mashriq ("The Poet of the East") and Hakeem-ul-Ummat ("The Sage of Ummah"); his birthday is annually commemorated in Pakistan as "Iqbal Day", a national holiday
- June 9 – Ovid Densusianu (aka "Ervin"; born 1873), Romanian poet, philologist, linguist, folklorist, literary historian, critic, academic and journalist
- June 26 – James Weldon Johnson (born 1871), African-American author, poet, early civil rights activist and prominent figure in the Harlem Renaissance, best known for his writing, including novels, poems and collections of folklore
- August 4 – Rudolf G. Binding (born 1867), German poet
- August 26 – Millosh Gjergj Nikolla ("Migjeni"; born 1911), Albanian poet and writer
- October 5 – Chieko Takamura (born 1886), Japanese (surname: Takamura)
- October 27 – Lascelles Abercrombie (born 1881), British poet and literary critic, one of the "Dymock poets"
- December 7 – Osip Mandelstam (born 1891), Russian poet, essayist and one of the foremost members of the Acmeist school of poets

== See also ==
- Poetry
- List of poetry awards
- List of years in poetry
