= The Crane Is My Neighbour =

Poem by Australian writer John Shaw Neilson

"The Crane is My Neighbour"
- by John Shaw Neilson
- Written: 1938
- First published in: Beauty Imposes : Some Recent Verse
- Country: Australia
- Language: English

Full text
- The Crane is My Neighbour at Wikisource

"The Crane is My Neighbour" (1938) is a poem by Australian poet John Shaw Neilson.

The poem was originally published in the author's poetry collection Beauty Imposes : Some Recent Verse by Angus and Robertson and subsequently reprinted in the author's major collection of poetry (Collected Verse of John Shaw Neilson edited by Margaret Roberts, UWA Publishing, 2012) as well as other poetry anthologies.

== Critical reception ==
While reviewing the poet's collection Beauty Imposes in The Argus reviewer G. W. H. notes: "Mr. Neilson has not lost the delicate sureness of touch which gained him his reputation, and this little volume has several exquisite things like "The Crane is My Neighbour," "Sunday Evening," and "Golden Fugitive." Mr. Neilson is as sensitive in his perception as he is in his use of words. It is this oneness in feeling and expression which sets his slight poetic creativeness above the ambitious but semi-articulate projects of many younger writers. In everything he does he is a poet."

In her introduction to the Collected Poems of John Shaw Neilson edited by Margaret Roberts, Helen Hewson wrote: "With the familiar cadence of 'The Lord is my shepherd', 'The Crane is my neighbour' answers a significant question, 'Who is my neighbour?' The question was asked of Jesus by a young lawyer. He answered with the parable of the Good Samaritan, and example of the unconditional love also portrayed in Psalm 23. Neilson's poem has the circular structure of one of the shorter psalms of praise."

== Publication history ==
After the poem's initial publication in Beauty Imposes : Some Recent Verse it was reprinted as follows:

- An Anthology of Australian Verse edited by George Mackaness, Angus & Robertson, 1952
- From the Ballads to Brennan edited by T. Inglis Moore, Angus & Robertson, 1964
- Australia’s Writers edited by Graeme Kinross-Smith, Nelson Books, 1980
- The Collins Book of Australian Poetry edited by Rodney Hall, Collins, 1981
- Cross-Country : A Book of Australian Verse edited by John Barnes and Brian MacFarlane, Heinemann, 1984
- My Country : Australian Poetry and Short Stories, Two Hundred Years edited by Leonie Kramer, Lansdowne, 1985
- Favourite Australian Poems, Child and Associates, 1987
- John Shaw Neilson : Poetry, Autobiography and Correspondence edited by Cliff Hanna, University of Queensland Press, 1991
- Selected Poems edited by Robert Gray, Angus & Robertson, 1993
- Australian Verse : An Oxford Anthology edited by John Leonard, Melbourne University Press, 1998
- Hell and After : Four Early English-Language Poets of Australia edited by Les Murray, Carcanet, 2005
- The Penguin Anthology of Australian Poetry edited by John Kinsella, Penguin, 2009
- The Puncher & Wattmann Anthology of Australian Poetry edited by John Leonard, Puncher & Wattmann, 2009
- Collected Verse of John Shaw Neilson edited by Margaret Roberts, UWA Publishing, 2012

== See also ==
- 1938 in Australian literature
- 1938 in poetry
