= The Poor Can Feed the Birds =

1938 poem by John Shaw Neilson

- by John Shaw Neilson
- First published in: Beauty Imposes : Some Recent Verse
- Country: Australia
- Language: English
- Publication date: 1938
- Lines: 30

Full text
- The Poor Can Feed the Birds at Wikisource

"The Poor Can Feed the Birds" is a poem by Australian poet John Shaw Neilson.

It was first published in the poet's collection Beauty Imposes : Some Recent Verse in 1938, and later in several of the poet's other collections and other Australian poetry anthologies.

== Critial reception ==
While reviewing Beauty Imposes : Some Recent Verse a reviewer in The Mail (Adelaide) called this poem "outstanding among the latest offerings, it has beauty, poignancy, and significance".

In her appraisal of Australian poetry, Preoccupations in Australian Poetry, Judith Wright noted that this was one of Neilson's "indignant and pitiful poems about the human misery that results from greed and oppression". She found it odd that, in spite of this and other such works, Neilson "has never been claimed with any assurance by the writers of the 'class-struggle' as one of themselves."

== Further publications ==
- Poets of Australia : An Anthology of Australian Verse edited by George Mackaness, Angus & Robertson, 1946
- Freedom on the Wallaby : Poems of the Australian People edited by Marjorie Pizer, Pinchgut Press, 1953
- Shaw Neilson edited by Judith Wright, Angus and Robertson, 1963
- From the Ballads to Brennan edited by T. Inglis Moore, Angus & Robertson, 1964
- Cross-Country : A Book of Australian Verse edited by John Barnes and Brian MacFarlane, Heinemann, 1984
- My Country : Australian Poetry and Short Stories, Two Hundred Years edited by Leonie Kramer, Lansdowne, 1985
- The Oxford Anthology of Australian Literature edited by Leonie Kramer and Adrian Mitchell, Oxford University Press, 1985
- John Shaw Neilson : Poetry, Autobiography and Correspondence edited by Cliff Hanna, University of Queensland Press, 1991
- Selected Poems by John Shaw Neilson, Angus and Robertson, 1993
- Hell and After : Four Early English-language Poets of Australia edited by Les Murray, Carcanet, 2005
- An Anthology of Australian Poetry to 1920 edited by John Kinsella, University of Western Australia Library, 2007
- Collected Verse of John Shaw Neilson edited by Margaret Roberts, UWA Publishing, 2012

== See also ==
- 1938 in poetry
- 1938 in literature
- 1938 in Australian literature
- Australian literature
