= Grace Ethel Martyr =

Australian poet, short story writer and journalist

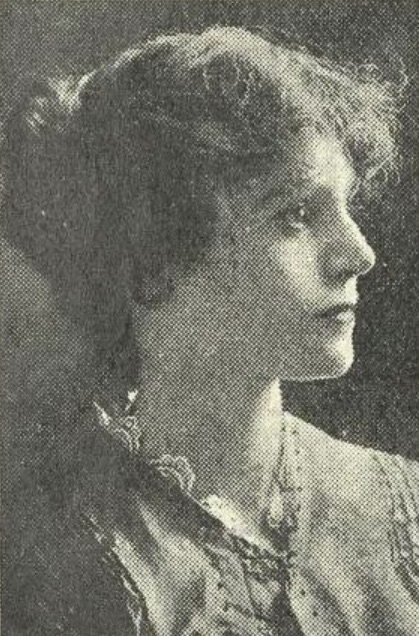
- Martyr in 1927
- Born: 1888; Ballarat, Victoria, Australia
- Died: 22 December 1934 (aged 45–46); Quarry Hill, Victoria, Australia
- Writing career
- Pen name: Ethel Martyr; G. E. Martyr; Grace E. Martyr; G. Ethel Martyr; E. Martyr

Grace Ethel Martyr (1888 – 22 December 1934) was an Australian poet, short story writer and journalist. She often wrote as Ethel Martyr.

== Early life and education ==
Grace Ethel Martyr was born in Ballarat, Victoria in 1888, the only daughter of Grace Flora (née King) and James Kent Martyr and grew up in Maldon. In mid-1906 she passed the University of Melbourne matriculation examination.

== Career ==
Her father worked for the Bank of New South Wales (now Westpac) throughout his career and Martyr joined that bank as a clerk for four and half years. She was forced to leave due to ill health. While at the bank, she had a book of poems, Afterwards and other verses, published by the Australasian Authors' Agency.

She won several prizes at the South Street Literary Awards in Ballarat; in 1918 for best patriotic poem and in 1919 for best original poem. In 1920 she came second to David McKee Wright in a field of 125 entries for best patriotic poem.

She worked for The Bendigo Advertiser as women's editor and also ran the children's page, remaining on the job until the week before her death.

She wrote many poems which were published in The Australasian, The Bulletin, Australian Woman's Mirror, The Herald and Weekly Times. Her short stories appeared in The Australasian and other newspapers; she wrote 11 stories which were serialised, including one published posthumously.

Journalist and poet, Zora Cross, writing as Bernice May, considered that Martyr and Tasmanian Hilda Bridges created "the most lovable and delightful small girls in our Australian literature today".

Martyr wrote song lyrics which Margaret Sutherland set to music, including Songs for Children, (1929) and "Two blue slippers for children's voices" (1936). She also collaborated with musician William James, creating material for radio programs for children.

== Selected works ==
=== Poetry ===
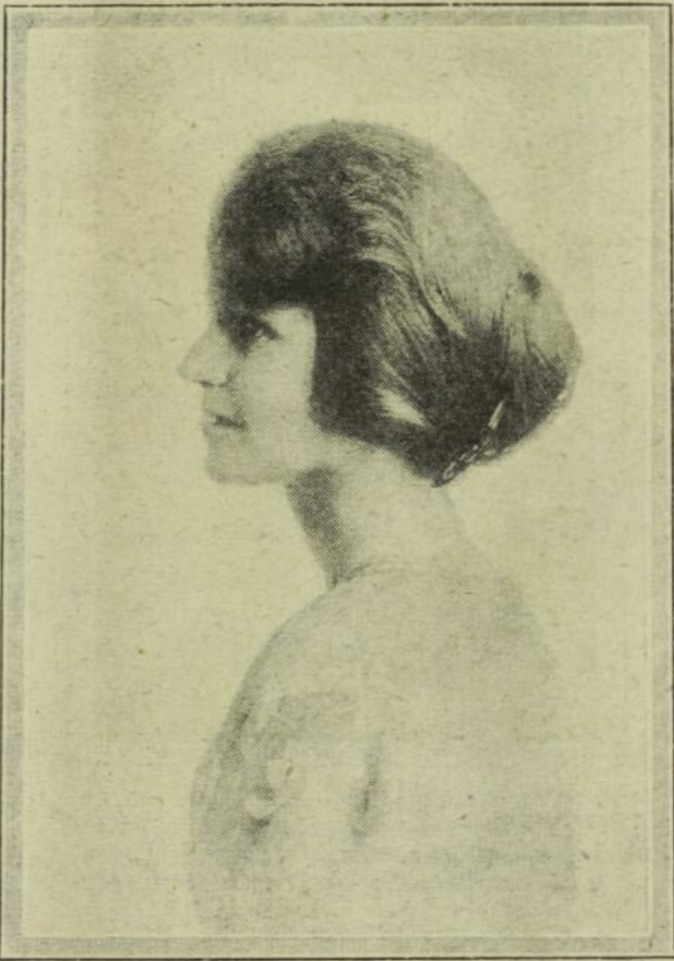
Grace Ethel Martyr in 1927

- Martyr, Grace Ethel (1918). Afterwards and other verses. Australasian Author's Agency.

=== Serialised stories ===
- "Young Jimmy", Weekly Times, 1925
- "The Tenby Children", The Australasian, 1925
- "Four Little Girls", The Australasian, 1926
- "Cinderella: A Tale of Treasure", The Australasian, 1927
- "Chums at Wunnamurra", The Queenslander, 1928
- "John and Judy", The Australasian, 1928
- "The Apple Tree", The Australasian, 1930
- "Green Timber", Weekly Times, 1930
- "Fairy Gold", The Australasian, 1932
- "The Happy Island", The Australasian, 1933
- "The Threshold", Weekly Times, 1937

== Death and legacy ==
Martyr died at Quarry Hill, near Bendigo in Victoria on 22 December 1934. There is no record of a marriage, although she was engaged to Lindsay Webb in 1911. Predeceased by her father in 1931, she was survived by her mother, who died in 1945.

In August 1935, during a service at St Paul's Church, a cross was dedicated by the Anglican bishop of Bendigo to her memory.

Five of her poems were included in Michael Sharkey's 2018 anthology, Many such as she: Victorian women poets of World War One.
