= 1924 in Australian literature =

This article presents a list of the historical events and publications of Australian literature during 1924.

== Books ==
- Dale Collins – Ordeal : A Novel
- Dulcie Deamer – The Devil's Saint
- Ruby M. Doyle – The Winning of Miriam Heron
- Mabel Forrest – The Wild Moth
- Arthur Gask – The Secret of the Garden
- D. H. Lawrence & M. L. Skinner – The Boy in the Bush
- Vance Palmer – Cronulla: A Story of Station Life
- Lillian M. Pyke – The Harp of Life
- Steele Rudd – Me an' th' Son
- Ethel Turner – Nicola Silver

== Short stories ==
- Katharine Susannah Prichard – "The Grey Horse"

== Children's and Young Adult fiction ==
- Charles Barrett – Bushland Babies
- Mary Grant Bruce – Billabong's Daughter
- Jean Curlewis – The Dawn Man
- May Gibbs – Chucklebud and Wunkydoo
- Lilian Turner – Jill of the Fourth Form

== Poetry ==
- Dulcie Deamer – "Messalina"
- C. J. Dennis – Rose of Spadgers
- Mary Gilmore – "The Brucedale Scandal"
- Henry Lawson – Humorous Verses
- Dorothea Mackellar
  - "Australian Autumn"
  - "Heritage"
- John Shaw Neilson
  - "Love in Absence"
  - "So Sweet a Mouth Had She"
- Will H. Ogilvie – "The Death of Ben Hall"
- Dowell O'Reilly – The Prose and Verse of Dowell O'Reilly
- Kenneth Slessor
  - "Thief of the Moon"
  - "Undine"

== Drama ==
- Vance Palmer – The Black Horse and Other Plays

== Births ==
A list, ordered by date of birth (and, if the date is either unspecified or repeated, ordered alphabetically by surname) of births in 1924 of Australian literary figures, authors of written works or literature-related individuals follows, including year of death.

- 8 April – David Denholm, author and historian who published fiction under the pseudonym David Forrest and history under his own name (died 1997)
- 31 May – Patsy Adam-Smith, author (died 2001)
- 16 July – Deirdre Cash (Criena Rohan), Australian novelist (died 1963)
- 27 August – David Rowbotham, poet (died 2010)
- 1 October – Leonie Kramer, academic and critic (died 2016)

== Deaths ==
A list, ordered by date of death (and, if the date is either unspecified or repeated, ordered alphabetically by surname) of deaths in 1924 of Australian literary figures, authors of written works or literature-related individuals follows, including year of birth.

- 11 March – Archibald Meston, journalist and explorer (born 1851 in Scotland)

== See also ==
- 1924 in Australia
- 1924 in literature
- 1924 in poetry
- List of years in Australian literature
- List of years in literature
