= Heart of Spring! (poem) =

1909 poem by John Shaw Neilson

- by John Shaw Neilson
- First published in: The Register
- Country: Australia
- Language: English
- Publication date: 20 February 1909
- Lines: 24

Full text
- Heart of Spring! at Wikisource

"Heart of Spring!" is a poem by Australian poet John Shaw Neilson.

It was first published in The Register on 20 February 1909, and was later reprinted in several of the poet's collections and other Australian poetry anthologies. It is also known by the titles "O Heart of Spring!", "Oh Heart of Spring" and "Blossoms of Thought".

== Critical reception ==
In her appraisal of Australian poetry, Preoccupations in Australian Poetry, Judith Wright noted "the love that Neilson celebrates, like the spring that is its physical correlate, is neither individual nor mortal." She went on to comment that "Neilson's spring is not a season, a month or even a part of time...it is a 'divine speech' set against the 'dark season' of death."

== Further publications ==
- The Sun (Sydney), 5 November 1911
- The Bookfellow, April 1915
- The Register, 20 February 1909
- The Oxford Book of Australasian Verse edited by Walter Murdoch, Oxford University Press, 1918
- Heart of Spring by John Shaw Neilson, Bookfellow, 1919
- Ballad and Lyrical Poems by John Shaw Neilson, Bookfellow, 1923
- An Australasian Anthology : Australian and New Zealand Poems edited by Percival Serle, R. H. Croll, and Frank Wilmot, Collins, 1927
- Collected Poems of John Shaw Neilson edited by R. H. Croll, Lothian, 1934
- Poets of Australia : An Anthology of Australian Verse edited by George Mackaness, Angus & Robertson, 1946
- Shaw Neilson edited by Judith Wright, Angus and Robertson, 1963
- Green Days and Cherries: The Early Verses of Shaw Neilson edited by Hugh Anderson and Leslie James Blake, Red Rooster Press, 1981
- John Shaw Neilson : Poetry, Autobiography and Correspondence edited by Cliff Hanna, University of Queensland Press, 1991
- Collected Verse of John Shaw Neilson edited by Margaret Roberts, UWA Publishing, 2012

== See also ==
- 1909 in poetry
- 1909 in literature
- 1909 in Australian literature
- Australian literature
