= The Death of Ben Hall =

1924 poem by Will H. Ogilvie

- by Will H. Ogilvie
- Written: 1924
- First published in: Smith's Weekly
- Illustrator: Stan Cross
- Country: Australia
- Language: English
- Subject: Ben Hall
- Lines: 95

"The Death of Ben Hall" (1924) is a poem by Scottish poet Will H. Ogilvie. It is also known under the title "The Betrayal of Ben Hall".

It was originally published in Smith's Weekly on 27 September 1924 and subsequently reprinted in a number of Australian poetry anthologies.

The poem relates the story of how the bushranger Ben Hall was killed by eight well-armed policemen on 5 May 1865.

== Publication history ==
After the poem's initial publication in Smith's Weekly it was reprinted as follows:

- Wild Colonial Boys edited by Frank Clune, Angus and Robertson, 1948
- Favourite Australian Poems edited by Ian Mudie, Rigby, 1963
- From the Ballads to Brennan edited by T. Inglis Moore, Angus & Robertson, 1964
- Old Australian Ballads edited by W. N. Walker, School Projects, 1967
- This Land : An Anthology of Australian Poetry for Young People edited by M. M. Flynn and J. Groom, Pergamon Press, 1968
- Complete Book of Australian Folk Lore edited by Bill Scott, 1976
- The Illustrated Treasury of Australian Verse edited by Beatrice Davis, Nelson, 1984
- My Country : Australian Poetry and Short Stories, Two Hundred Years edited by Leonie Kramer, Lansdowne, 1985
- Old Ballads from the Bush edited by Bill Scott, Angus and Robertson, 1987
- On the Track with Bill Bowyang edited by Hugh Anderson and Dawn Anderson, Red Rooster Press, 1992
- Breaker's Mate: Will Ogilvie in Australia edited by John Meredith, Kangaroo Press, 1996
- Classic Australian Verse edited by Maggie Pinkney, Five Mile Press, 2001
- Two Centuries of Australian Poetry edited by Kathrine Bell, Gary Allen, 2007
- 100 Australian Poems You Need to Know edited by Jamie Grant, Hardie Grant, 2008
- Australian Poetry Since 1788 edited by Geoffrey Lehmann and Robert Gray, University of NSW Press, 2011

== See also ==
- 1924 in Australian literature
- 1924 in poetry
