= Song Be Delicate =

1913 poem by John Shaw Neilson

- by John Shaw Neilson
- Original title: Let Your Song Be Delicate
- First published in: The Bookfellow, 15 November 1913
- Country: Australia
- Language: English
- Publication date: 1913
- Lines: 20

Full text
- Song Be Delicate at Wikisource

"Song Be Delicate" is a poem by Australian poet John Shaw Neilson. It was first published in The Bookfellow on 15 November 1913 with the title "Let Your Song Be Delicate", and later in the poet's collections and other Australian poetry anthologies.

== Outline ==
"Song Be Delicate" is a love poem, encouraging lovers to be kind to each other in the face of the world's problems.

== Analysis ==
In a piece on the poet's work in The Sydney Morning Herald, "S. R." noted that this individual poem "seems to describe Neilson's poetry" in general.

H. M. Green, in his work A History of Australian Literature called the atmosphere of the poem "a happy one", also describing the work as "etheriel".

== Further publications ==
- Heart of Spring, Bookfellow, 1919
- Poetry in Australia 1923, Vision Press, 1923
- An Australasian Anthology : Australian and New Zealand Poems edited by Percival Serle, R. H. Croll, and Frank Wilmot, Collins, 1927
- Collected Poems of John Shaw Neilson edited by R. H. Croll, Lothian, 1934
- Poets of Australia : An Anthology of Australian Verse edited by George Mackaness, Angus & Robertson, 1946
- An Anthology of Australian Verse edited by George Mackaness, Angus & Robertson, 1952
- A Book of Australian Verse edited by Judith Wright, Oxford University Press, 1956
- From the Ballads to Brennan edited by T. Inglis Moore, Angus & Robertson, 1964
- Bards in the Wilderness : Australian Colonial Poetry to 1920 edited by Adrian Mitchell and Brian Elliott, Nelson, 1970
- The Penguin Book of Australian Verse edited by Harry Heseltine, Penguin Books, 1972
- The Golden Apples of the Sun : Twentieth Century Australian Poetry edited by Chris Wallace-Crabbe, Melbourne University Press, 1980
- Green Days and Cherries: The Early Verses of Shaw Neilson edited by Hugh Anderson and Leslie James Blake, Red Rooster Press, 1981
- The Illustrated Treasury of Australian Verse edited by Beatrice Davis, Nelson, 1984
- Cross-Country : A Book of Australian Verse edited by John Barnes and Brian MacFarlane, Heinemann, 1984
- My Country : Australian Poetry and Short Stories, Two Hundred Years edited by Leonie Kramer, Lansdowne, 1985
- Two Centuries of Australian Poetry edited by Mark O'Connor, Oxford University Press, 1988
- John Shaw Neilson : Poetry, Autobiography and Correspondence edited by Cliff Hanna, University of Queensland Press, 1991
- Selected Poems by John Shaw Neilson, Angus and Robertson, 1993
- The Oxford Book of Australian Love Poems edited by Jennifer Strauss, Oxford University Press, 1993
- A Return to Poetry 2000 edited by Michael Duffy, Duffy and Snellgrove, 2000
- Our Country : Classic Australian Poetry : From Colonial Ballads to Paterson & Lawson edited by Michael Cook, Little Hills Press, 2002
- Hell and After : Four Early English-language Poets of Australia edited by Les Murray, Carcanet 2005
- An Anthology of Australian Poetry to 1920 edited by John Kinsella, University of Western Australia Library, 2007
- Southerly, Vol 68, No 3, 2008
- 100 Australian Poems of Love and Loss edited by Jamie Grant, Hardie Grant Books, 2011

== See also ==
- 1913 in poetry
- 1913 in literature
- 1913 in Australian literature
- Australian literature
