= Rose of Spadgers =

1924 poetry collection by C. J. Dennis

- 1982 edition
- Author: C. J. Dennis
- Language: English
- Genre: Poetry collection
- Publisher: Cornstalk Publishing
- Publication date: 1924
- Publication place: Australia
- Media type: Print
- Pages: 194 pp
- Preceded by: Digger Smith
- Followed by: -

Rose of Spadgers is a collection of poems by Australian poet and journalist C. J. Dennis, published by Cornstalk Publishing in 1924. The collection includes a number of black and white illustrations by Hal Gye.

The book is subtitled "A Sequel to Ginger Mick", and tells the story of Ginger Mick's widow Rose, as the Sentimental Bloke tries to ensure that she is doing well, and is kept away from the wiles of the book's villain, Spike Wegg.

All of the sixteen poems in the collection were published here for the first time.

== Contents ==
- "Introduction" as by The Sentimental Bloke
- "The Faltering Knight"
- "Termarter Sorce"
- "A Holy War"
- "Nocturne"
- "The Crusaders"
- "'Ave a 'Eart!"
- "Rose"
- "The Knight's Return"
- "The Also-Ran"
- "A Woman's Way"
- "Stone the Crows"
- "Listener's Luck"
- "The Dance"
- "Spike Wegg"
- "Narcissus"

== Background ==
Dennis told a reporter at The Register newspaper in Adelaide that the inspiration for the work came about after he had been seated behind a woman at a screening of the film adaptation of Ginger Mick. The women was distressed as she was worried about what was going to happen to Rose after the death of Ginger Mick.

In his biography of C. J. Dennis critic Philip Butterss describes Dennis's wife Biddy writing to his publisher George Robertson in March 1924 telling him about Dennis's heavy drinking and noting that he, Dennis, was back in hospital. Robertson wrote to Dennis immediately suggesting that he write another book: "What about Rose?"

== Critical reception ==
A reviewer in The Advocate, from Burnie Tasmania, noted: "The Sentimental Bloke tells the story in an introduction and 15 sets of verse, and the book (the value of which, by the way, is enhanced by pen and ink sketches by Hal Gye), is a sheer delight from beginning to end. The merit of it is equal to that of Mr. Dennis' previous efforts. That is high praise, but it is justified."

In The Australasian a writer described it "as a complete novel in verse, with a proper plot, a detestable villain, one or two attractive heroes, an adorable heroine, and a delightful romance. There are several thrilling episodes, and there is plenty of comedy." They went on to describe the book as "a sound, manly piece of work, not only well written, but well constructed, and full of humor and pathos."

== Publication history ==
After the initial publication of the collection by Cornstalk Publishing in 1924, it was reprinted as follows:

- 1982 Angus & Robertson, Australia

== See also ==
- 1924 in Australian literature
- "Chapter 11: Ruin and Reburnishing, 1920–1924" in An Unsentimental Bloke: The Life and Work of C. J. Dennis by Philip Butterss
