= Love's Coming (poem) =

1911 poem by John Shaw Neilson

- by John Shaw Neilson
- First published in: The Daily Herald
- Country: Australia
- Language: English
- Publication date: 13 May 1911
- Lines: 20

Full text
- Love's Coming (Shaw poem) at Wikisource

"Love's Coming" is a poem by Australian poet John Shaw Neilson. It was first published in The Daily Herald on 13 May 1911, and later in the poet's collections and other Australian poetry anthologies.

== Analysis ==
In a piece on the poet's work in The Sydney Morning Herald, "S. R." praised the "delicacy and sweetness of this work."

Shortly after the poet's death, an appreciation of his work in The Daily Mercury newspaper praised the poet's lyric poetry, using this poem as an example and noting: "It would be over-bold to say that a line of words can mean only one bald material thing. It may evoke a thousand images. The choice of words, the vowel tones, the rhythm of the metre, all make their subtle suggestions, and transport us to a realm of faery, where anything beautiful may be true."

H. M. Green, in his volume A History of Australian Literature, called the poem "etherial", also describing the work, along with a few others by the same poet, as "among the most beautiful of their kind in modern literature".

== Further publications ==
- The Sun (Sydney), 14 May 1911
- The Oxford Book of Australasian Verse edited by Walter Murdoch, Oxford University Press, 1918
- Heart of Spring by John Shaw Neilson, Bookfellow, 1919
- An Australasian Anthology : Australian and New Zealand Poems edited by Percival Serle, R. H. Croll, and Frank Wilmot, Collins, 1927
- New Song in an Old Land edited by Rex Ingamells, Longmans Green, 1948
- An Anthology of Australian Verse edited by George Mackaness, Angus & Robertson, 1952
- The Penguin Book of Australian Verse edited by John Thompson, Kenneth Slessor and R. G. Howarth, Penguin Books, 1958
- From the Ballads to Brennan edited by T. Inglis Moore, Angus & Robertson, 1964
- Makar, 21 May 1965
- Green Days and Cherries: The Early Verses of Shaw Neilson edited by Hugh Anderson and Leslie James Blake, Red Rooster Press, 1981
- The Illustrated Treasury of Australian Verse edited by Beatrice Davis, Nelson, 1984
- Cross-Country : A Book of Australian Verse edited by John Barnes and Brian MacFarlane, Heinemann, 1984
- My Country : Australian Poetry and Short Stories, Two Hundred Years edited by Leonie Kramer, Lansdowne, 1985
- The Oxford Anthology of Australian Literature edited by Leonie Kramer and Adrian Mitchell, Oxford University Press, 1985
- Two Centuries of Australian Poetry edited by Mark O’Connor, Oxford University Press, 1988
- Love Came So Lightly : Australian Love Sonnets and Such Angus and Robertson, 1990
- John Shaw Neilson : Poetry, Autobiography and Correspondence edited by Cliff Hanna, University of Queensland Press, 1991
- The Language of Love: An Anthology of Australian Love Letters, Poetry and Prose edited by Pamela Allardice, Angus and Robertson, 1991
- Selected Poems by John Shaw Neilson, Angus and Robertson, 1993
- The Oxford Book of Australian Love Poems edited by Jennifer Strauss, Oxford University Press, 1993
- Hell and After : Four Early English-language Poets of Australia edited by Les Murray, Carcanet 2005
- Two Centuries of Australian Poetry edited by Kathrine Bell, Gary Allen, 2007
- An Anthology of Australian Poetry to 1920 edited by John Kinsella, University of Western Australia Library, 2007
- The Penguin Anthology of Australian Poetry edited by John Kinsella, Penguin, 2009
- 100 Australian Poems of Love and Loss edited by Jamie Grant, Hardie Grant Books, 2011
- Australian Poetry Since 1788 edited by Geoffrey Lehmann and Robert Gray, University of NSW Press, 2011
- Collected Verse of John Shaw Neilson edited by Margaret Roberts, UWA Publishing, 2012

== See also ==
- 1911 in poetry
- 1911 in literature
- 1911 in Australian literature
- Australian literature
