= Moonlight Acre =

Poetry collection by R. D. Fitzgerald

- Title page for Moonlight Acre (1938)
- Author: R. D. Fitzgerald
- Language: English
- Publisher: Melbourne University Press
- Publication date: 1938
- Publication place: Australia
- Media type: Print
- Pages: 71
- Preceded by: The Greater Apollo : Seven Metaphysical Songs
- Followed by: This Night's Orbit : Verses

Moonlight Acre (1938) is a collection of poems by Australian poet R. D. Fitzgerald. It won the ALS Gold Medal in 1938.

== Contents ==
- "Moonlight Acre"
- "Copernicus"
- "The Hidden Bole"
- "Essay on Memory"

== Critical reception ==
On its original publication in Australia a reviewer in The Sydney Morning Herald was rather unstinting in their praise by stating "This slim volume contains work of such a high order that it should go far to establish Mr. FitzGerald as one of the finest contemporary poets writing in English." They went on to state: "Although it avoids the wilful obscurity and recondite allusions of many younger English poets, misled by Eliot and Pound, it can challenge them bravely on their own ground of intellectual subtlety. Mr. FitzGerald, moreover, has a poetic advantage over his English contemporaries in that, while they wrestle over political and social problems, he grapples with the larger issues of man and his universe".

The reviewer in The Telegraph (Brisbane) looked more deeply into the poems in the collection: "The poems are not easy reading, each presenting certain difficulties arising from the author's labours in attempting to solve his intellectual-emotional problems, a task artistically but not spiritually fruitful. Mostly of iambic pulse, the poems are tinctured with a metaphysical mysticism, partly pure pagan and partly the issue of a mind influenced by modern psychology and biology. The incongruity of such a mental mixture is evidenced by the poet's analysis and synthesis. Gravely disturbed by human conditions, he arraigns Peace and champions the sword of War as a cleansing scourge."

== See also ==
- 1938 in Australian literature
- 1938 in poetry
