= Beauty Imposes : Some Recent Verse =

1938 poetry collection by John Shaw Neilson

- Author: Shaw Neilson
- Language: English
- Genre: Poetry collection
- Publisher: Angus & Robertson
- Publication date: 1938
- Publication place: Australia
- Media type: Print
- Pages: 34 pp.

Beauty Imposes : Some Recent Verse is a collection of poetry by Australian author Shaw Neilson, published by Angus and Robertson in Sydney, New South Wales, in 1938.

The collection contains 14 poems from a variety of sources.

== Contents ==
- "The Theme Eternal"
- "The Road to the Hospital"
- "The Crane Is My Neighbour"
- "The Vine That is a Friend"
- "Uncle to a Pirate"
- "The Long Week-end"
- "The Time of Tumult"
- "Golden Fugitive"
- "He Saw the Jig"
- "The Poor Can Feed the Birds"
- "The Sundowner"
- "Sunday Evening"
- "I Spoke to the Violet"
- "Beauty Imposes"

== Critical reception ==
A reviewer on the Red Page of The Bulletin commented that "Whether it's due to climate or not, there is a deliberate use of color in Shaw Neilson's verse—patterns in gold and green and aspirations in white that suit his quiet talent".

The Mail (Adelaide) saw a lot of qualities in the collection: "Shaw Neilson's verse is clear, sweet, and often worth-while, as this little volume shows. Mr. Neilson is not a young man in years, but he has retained a young man's thrust, vividness, and keen feeling. There is a kind of supple strength about much of this Australian's work, too."

== See also ==
- 1938 in Australian literature
