= 1938 in Australian literature =

This article presents a list of the historical events and publications of Australian literature during 1938.

== Books ==
- Martin Boyd – Night of the Party
- Eleanor Dark – Waterway
- Arthur Gask – The Fall of a Dictator
- Xavier Herbert – Capricornia
- Michael Innes – Lament for a Maker
- Norman Lindsay – Age of Consent
- Alice Grant Rosman – Unfamiliar Faces
- Nevil Shute – Ruined City
- Christina Stead – House of All Nations
- F. J. Thwaites
  - The Mad Doctor in Harley Street
  - A Man of Destiny
- E. V. Timms – Maelstrom
- Arthur Upfield – The Bone is Pointed

== Short stories ==
- Alan Marshall – "Clarkey's Dead"
- Katharine Susannah Prichard – "Marlene"

== Poetry ==
- R. D. FitzGerald – Moonlight Acre
- A. D. Hope – "Standardisation"
- Jack Moses – Nine Miles from Gundagai
- John Shaw Neilson – Beauty Imposes : Some Recent Verse

== Drama ==
=== Radio ===
- Max Afford – The Fantastic Case of The Four Specialists
- Edmund Barclay – Canberra the Great
- Fitzmaurice Hill – All Is Made Manifest
- Vance Palmer – The Sea Hawk
- Catherine Shepherd
  - Daybreak
  - The Fated Hour
- Alexander Turner – Conglomerate

=== Theatre ===
- Sumner Locke Elliott – The Folly of It

== Awards and honours ==
=== Literary ===
Award	Author	Title	Publisher
ALS Gold Medal	R. D. FitzGerald	Moonlight Acre	Melbourne University Press

== Births ==
A list, ordered by date of birth (and, if the date is either unspecified or repeated, ordered alphabetically by surname) of births in 1938 of Australian literary figures, authors of written works or literature-related individuals follows, including year of death.

- 10 March – Tony Morphett, scriptwriter (died 2018)
- 28 July – Robert Hughes, critic (died 2012)
- 21 August – Mudrooroo, novelist, poet and playwright (died 2019)
- 17 October – Les Murray, poet (died 2019)
- 30 October – Morris Lurie, novelist (died 2014)
- 21 December – Frank Moorhouse, novelist (died 2022)

== Deaths ==
A list, ordered by date of death (and, if the date is either unspecified or repeated, ordered alphabetically by surname) of deaths in 1938 of Australian literary figures, authors of written works or literature-related individuals follows, including year of birth.

- 21 January – Will Dyson, poet and artist (born 1880)
- 7 February – Constance Le Plastrier, writer, schoolteacher and botanist (born 1864)
- 22 June – C. J. Dennis, poet (born 1876)
- 29 November — John Sandes, poet, journalist and author (born 1863)

== See also ==
- 1938 in Australia
- 1938 in literature
- 1938 in poetry
- List of years in Australian literature
- List of years in literature
