= The Break of Day =

1918 poem by John Shaw Neilson

- by John Shaw Neilson
- First published in: The Oxford Book of Australasian Verse (1918) edited by Walter Murdoch
- Country: Australia
- Language: English
- Publication date: 1918
- Lines: 12

Full text
- The Break of Day at Wikisource

"The Break of Day" is a poem by Australian poet John Shaw Neilson.

The first known publication of the poem was in The Oxford Book of Australasian Verse (1918), edited by Walter Murdoch. It was later reprinted in several of the poet's collections and other Australian poetry anthologies.

== Critical reception ==
In an overview of Australian literature for The Herald newspaper, titled "The Birth of a Literature", a critic noted, of the poet and of this poem in particular, "Joy, for this gifted contradiction of the land he was born and bred in, is always only something 'lost in a quaint parable,' from whose brow-wrinkling intricacies it will alwaysturn up again—and nothing matters but that it has turned up. When it has, Neilson sits down to write: the hard labor of the day was, after all, only the prelude to the ecstasy of the sunset, it was only a foolish incident against which rapture would, of course, shine at last."

In her appraisal of Australian poetry, Preoccupations in Australian Poetry, Judith Wright noted "The light fell on him unfiltered. From that fact, perhaps, comes his chief fault, his lack of self-criticism which led to occasional banality; but from it also come those phrases and cadences which strike home with so surprising a twist of the knife, or touch off a flare of light by which we see again something we have not seen since childhood." Wright then quotes from the verse beginning "An evil time is done" to illustrate this point.

== Further publications ==
- Heart of Spring by John Shaw Neilson, Bookfellow, 1919
- Collected Poems of John Shaw Neilson edited by R. H. Croll, Lothian, 1934
- A Book of Australian Verse edited by Judith Wright, Oxford University Press, 1956
- Shaw Neilson edited by Judith Wright, Angus and Robertson, 1963
- From the Ballads to Brennan edited by T. Inglis Moore, Angus & Robertson, 1964
- Bards in the Wilderness : Australian Colonial Poetry to 1920 edited by Adrian Mitchell and Brian Elliott, Nelson, 1970
- Green Days and Cherries: The Early Verses of Shaw Neilson edited by Hugh Anderson and Leslie James Blake, Red Rooster Press, 1981
- The Sun is Up : Selected Poems by John Shaw Neilson, Loch Haven, 1991
- John Shaw Neilson : Poetry, Autobiography and Correspondence edited by Cliff Hanna, University of Queensland Press, 1991
- Selected Poems by John Shaw Neilson, Angus and Robertson, 1993
- Australian Poetry Since 1788 edited by Geoffrey Lehmann and Robert Gray , University of NSW Press, 2011
- Collected Verse of John Shaw Neilson edited by Margaret Roberts, UWA Publishing, 2012

== See also ==
- 1918 in poetry
- 1918 in literature
- 1918 in Australian literature
- Australian literature
