= Heart of Spring =

1919 poetry collection by John Shaw Neilson

- Author: Shaw Neilson
- Language: English
- Genre: Poetry collection
- Publisher: Bookfellow
- Publication date: 1919
- Publication place: Australia
- Media type: Print
- Pages: 93 pp.

Heart of Spring is the debut collection of poetry by Australian author Shaw Neilson, published by The Bookfellow Publishers in Sydney, New South Wales, in 1919.

The collection contains 57 poems from a variety of sources, with a preface by A. G. Stephens. It was also issued as 25 copy limited and numbered edition in 1919.

== Contents ==
- "Heart of Spring!"
- "The Green Singer"
- "Song Be Delicate"
- "Petticoat Green"
- "Greeting"
- "The Land Where I Was Born"
- "The Sun is Up"
- "The Pale Neighbour"
- "To a Blue Flower"
- "Old Nell Dickerson"
- "Bush Scene"
- "Julie Callaway"
- "Lowan's Nest"
- "Old Granny Sullivan"
- "May"
- "Maggie Tulliver"
- "The Break of Day"
- "Little Dead Milliner"
- "'The Day is Thine'"
- "Sheedy Was Dying"
- "The Eyes of Little Charlotte"
- "The Meeting of Sighs"
- "Old Violin"
- "Love's Coming"
- "The Lover Sings"
- "The Girl with the Black Hair"
- "'Twas in the Early Summer Time"
- "As Far as My Heart Can Go"
- "Her Eyes"
- "The Heart Longs"
- "The Hour Is Lost"
- "Surely God Was a Lover"
- "You, and Yellow Air"
- "The Dear Little Cottage"
- "Roses Three"
- "The Sacrifice"
- "Little White Girl"
- "In the Street"
- "The Child of Tears"
- "The Petticoat Plays"
- "The Loving Tree"
- "Inland Born"
- "The Child We Lost"
- "Under a Kurrajong"
- "The Luckless Bard to the Flying Blossom"
- "From a Coffin"
- "All the World's a Lolly Shop"
- "It is the Last"
- "The White Flowers Came"
- "The Wedding in September"
- "The Hour of the Parting"
- "O Lady of the Dazzling Flowers"
- "The Song and the Bird"
- "The Scent o' the Lover"
- "At the End of Spring"
- "For a Child"
- "The Dream is Deep"

== Critical reception ==
A reviewer in The Bulletin described the book as being "full of delicate charm." They continued: "His is not the strong, clear note of a master singer; his themes are often of the slightest and his craftsmanship enables him to miss the commonplace by a very narrow margin; but the work will please the literary reader, while, by a certain gentle force which it possesses, it may reach many to whom much modern poetry is a thing strange and incomprehensible."

The Queenslander noted that the "great merit of the poems...lies in their exquisite refinement, their impeccable simplicity, and rapid flow of rich lyric laughter."

== See also ==
- 1919 in Australian literature
