= Conglomerate (play) =

- Genre: drama play
- Running time: 30 mins (9:00 pm – 9:30 pm)
- Country of origin: Australia
- Language: English
- Home station: 2BL
- Written by: Alexander Turner
- Original release: 13 May 1938

Conglomerate is a 1938 Australian radio play by Alexander Turner about a gold robbery in a small town.

The play represented Western Australia in the ABC's 1938 Drama Festival, where the Commission broadcast a series of plays.

The play was performed again in 1939.

It was published in a 1946 collection of Australian radio plays.

== Reception ==
Leslie Rees said it might be termed a "dramatic descriptive of life on a hard, hot, dusty Western Australian goldfield. The commonplace and the picturesque are merged in an arresting pattern. Turner writes of what he knows".

A critic from Wireless Weekly described the play as a "chorus-commentary out of a girl’s voice reading a letter from her lover on the goldfields. A bit of reading, a bit of action, a bit of reading, a bit of action. I remember a conversation in whispers that nearly split my loud speaker about robbing a bank, also a train going on and on, and the woman’s husband being killed and she just going back. I remember feeling sad about this, and then waking up with a shock to choral excerpts from "Maritana" - the play seemed to have run away from me on the train. Maybe this was the effect Mr. Turner intended."

A different critic from Wireless Weekly reviewing a 1939 production said "I must congratulate Mr. Alexander Turner on his story. Its many facets were cleverly arranged, and I approved the way he based each scene on an extract from a letter written by a bank clerk in Murchison to his sweetheart at the coast."

According to the Western Australian "he human sympathy, close observation and the clear simplicity of Mr. Turner's writing are again the virtues of this play. There is enough dramatic quality in the plotting of the robbery to provide the tension that is probably necessary to make radio drama hold the attention of a wide audience, but it is the discovery and delineation of the life of bank clerk, railway guard, mother, nurse, barmaid and miner and, in part, of the very Goldfields town itself, that lifts this play far above scores of others which have stories as involved and surprising as the wiring of a home-made radio set."

The Bulletin called it "a study of goldfields life, interesting in its minor details of bars, nurses, country trains, but depending too much on accident, and a crude "wow" type of ending".

== Premise ==
According to Wireless Weekly it was "a cross-section of the life of a Murchison goldfield, Western Australia. It is a hard, hot, dusty picture. Yet romance emerges, crime, humor, pathos, tragedy. Into a relatively short play the author of 'Hester Siding' and 'Coat of Arms' has packed a three-dimensional view of a goldfields community - the empty skyline of the fields, broken only by poppet heads and dumps; the barren expanse of semi-desert glittering in the fierce sunshine; and drawn back on to its dusty hillock like a regiment hard-pressed. the huddle of iron huts which is Murchison - railhead and metropolis of the Murchison goldfield, with unchallenged dominion over a thousand miles of the hardest country on earth. Gold beer heat wool machinery corrugated iron stones mail trucks —there's your background for Murchison".
