= Edward Harrington (poet) =

Edward Phillip Harrington
- Born: 28 September 1895; Shepparton, Victoria, Australia
- Died: 28 May 1966 (aged 70); North Melbourne, Victoria, Australia
- Occupation: Poet

Edward Phillip Harrington (28 September 1895 – 28 May 1966) was an Australian poet and short story writer, the last of the bush balladists.

Born in Shepparton, in central Victoria, Harrington was the fourth child of Philip Harrington, a farmer from Ireland, and his Australian wife, Margaret O'Brien. Edward Harrington served in Palestine with the Australian Light Horse during the First World War, and took part in the charge on Beersheba. He was discharged in 1919 with a repatriation pension, as he needed medical attention for the rest of his life. Harrington was a founding member of the Australian Poetry Lovers' Society (1934) and the Bread and Cheese Club (1938). He is generally referred to as the last of the Bush Balladists.

== Bibliography ==
- Songs of War and Peace (1920)
- Boundary Bend and Other Ballads (1936)
- My Old Black Billy and Other Songs of the Australian Outback (1940)
- The Kerrigan Boys and Other Australian Verses (1944)
- The Swagless Swaggie and Other Ballads : Selected Verse of Edward Harrington (1957)
