= A. R. D. Fairburn =

New Zealand poet, satirist, and critic

- Born: Arthur Rex Dugard Fairburn; 2 February 1904; Auckland, New Zealand
- Died: 25 March 1957 (aged 53); Auckland, New Zealand
- Other name: "Rex" Fairburn
- Occupation: Poet

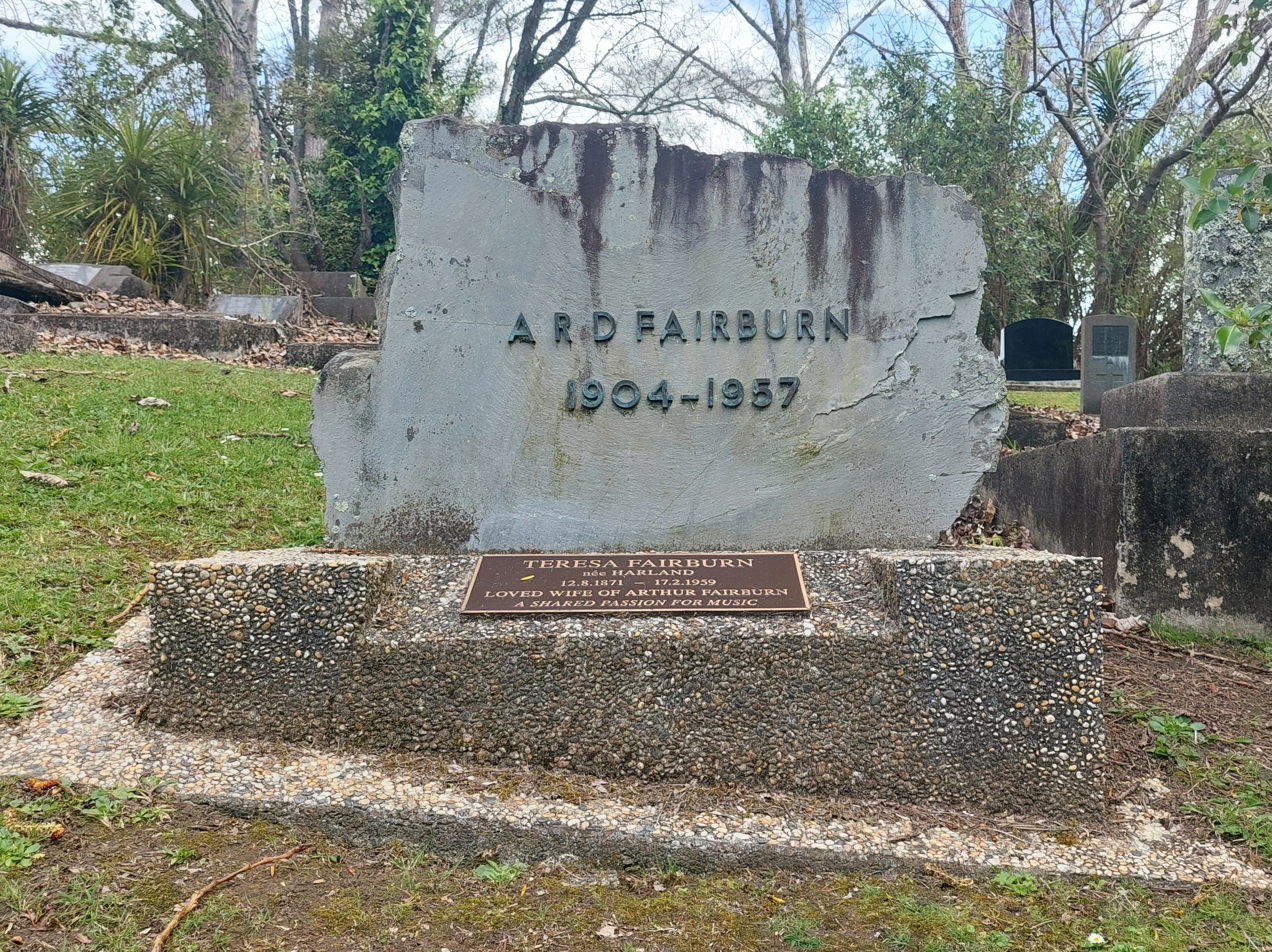
Fairburn's grave in Albany, Auckland, buried together with his mother, Teresa

Arthur Rex Dugard Fairburn (2 February 1904 – 25 March 1957), commonly known by his initials A. R. D. Fairburn and otherwise as Rex, was a New Zealand poet who was born and died in Auckland.

Fairburn was born in Auckland in 1904. His grandfather, the surveyor, thinker and traveller Edwin Fairburn, was one of the first Pākehā born in New Zealand in 1827. His great-grandfather, William Thomas Fairburn, had come to New Zealand as a missionary for the New Zealand Church Missionary Society in 1819.

Fairburn attended Auckland Grammar School, where he first met R. A. K. Mason, and worked at various jobs, including relief work on the roads. Later he tutored in English and lectured on the history and theory of Art at Elam School of Art, Auckland University College. His poetry was initially influenced by the (then unfashionable) Georgian poets.

== Works ==
- He Shall Not Rise [1930]
- Dominion (1938)
- Poems 1929–41
- Walking on My Feet (1945)
- Strange Rendezview (1952)
- Three Poems including Dominion, The Voyage, To a Friend in the Wilderness (1952)

Satirical and light verse

- The Sky is a Limpet (A Polytickle Parrotty)
- How to Ride a Bicycle (In Seventeen Lovely Colours)
- The Rakehelly Man
- Poetry Harbinger
- Reverie on the Rat
- Rhyme of the Dead Self
