= Digger Smith =

1918 poetry collection by C. J. Dennis

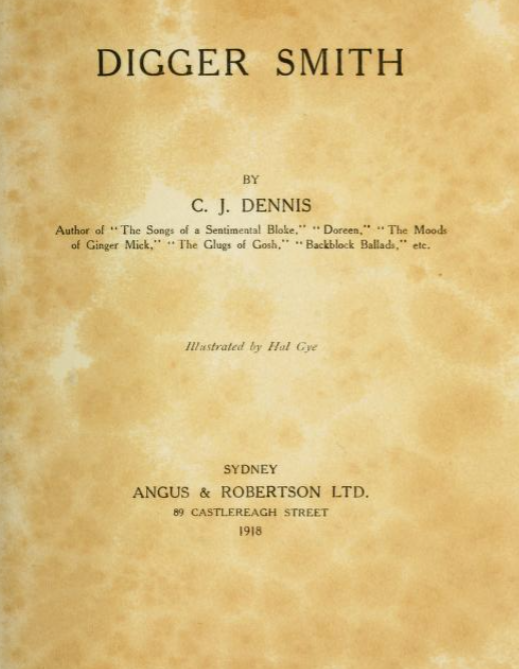
- Title page for Digger Smith (1918)
- Author: C. J. Dennis
- Language: English
- Genre: Poetry collection
- Publisher: Angus and Robertson
- Publication date: 1918
- Publication place: Australia
- Media type: Print
- Pages: 112 pp
- Preceded by: Doreen
- Followed by: Rose of Spadgers
- Text: Digger Smith at Wikisource

Digger Smith is a collection of poems by Australian poet and journalist C. J. Dennis, published by Angus and Robertson, in 1918. The collection includes two illustrated plates by Hal Gye, along with a black and white illustration for each poem.

The collection is based on the story of "Digger Smith" who was one of Ginger Mick's comrades at Sari Bair. He is referred to in The Moods of Ginger Mick as "little Smith 'uv Collingwood". It tells of Smith's return to Collingwood from France and what happens to him in the years that follow as he fulfills a promise he made to his friend Jim Flood on the battlefield. Smith's story is narrated by "The Bloke".

All of the thirteen poems in the collection were published here for the first time.

== Contents ==
- "Before the War"
- "The Dummy Bridge"
- "Dad"
- "Digger Smith"
- "West"
- "Over the Fence"
- "A Digger's Tale"
- "Jim's Girl"
- "The Boys Out There"
- "Have a Man"
- "Sawin' Wood"
- "Jim"
- "A Square Deal"

== Critical reception ==
In The Herald (Melbourne) a reviewer called the book "A distinctly fine piece of work, making its appearance at the opportune moment. The clever handling of a dozen or more common and every day episodes; its truth to every-day life, its appeal to the simplest and most fundamental emotions, will win hundreds who are not professed admirers of poetry, while the ideals we should keep before us in the difficult time immediately ahead were never more simply and effectively stated. The book will have an immediate practical effect."

Noting the publication of the book in the Australian Town and Country Journal a reviwer commented: "The diction employed is that of Ginger Mick, and some readers may find it now and again a little wearisome; but there can be no doubt as to the frequent presence of humor closely akin to tears."

== Publication history ==
After the initial publication of the collection by Angus and Robertson in 1918, it was reprinted as follows:

- 1920 Angus & Robertson, Australia
- 1982 Angus & Robertson, Australia
- 2008 Kessinger Publishing, USA
- 2018 HarperCollins, Australia

== See also ==
- 1918 in Australian literature
- "Chapter 10: Diggers and Timber Getters, 1918-1919" in An Unsentimental Bloke: The Life and Work of C. J. Dennis by Philip Butterss
