= An Irish Heart =

1918 poetry collection by David McKee Wright

- Author: David McKee Wright
- Language: English
- Genre: Poetry collection
- Publisher: Angus and Robertson
- Publication date: 1918
- Publication place: Australia
- Media type: Print
- Pages: 137 pp.

An Irish Heart is a collection of poems by New Zealand/Australian poet David McKee Wright, published by Angus and Robertson in 1918.

The collection contains 43 poems from a variety of sources, mainly The Bulletin and The Lone Hand, with some being published here for the first time.

== Contents ==
- "An Irish Heart"
- "Norah's Courting"
- "Morn's Desire"
- "The Wave"
- "The Kissing of Pegeen"
- "A Song of Pipes and Trees"
- "The Robin"
- "Bridal Song"
- "Youth"
- "The Holy Piper"
- "Sunset Bay"
- "The Beggar's Bowl"
- "A Song of Red Things"
- "Earth Song"
- "Fairy Rose"
- "A New Zealand Fairy Song"
- "Creation"
- "The Silver Ring"
- "Viking Song"
- "The Singers"
- "The Balcony"
- "The Song of Little Gardens"
- "Ireland"
- "Hellas at Watson's Bay"
- "Weed-Tryst"
- "Moon Dream"
- "Pen of Mine"
- "The Holy Thing"
- "Cave Night"
- "In Green and Blue"
- "Child Song of the Rain"
- "Immortality"
- "The Moon-Girl"
- "A Silent Poet"
- "Wreckers"
- "Haunted Memory"
- "Margaret"
- "The Inventors"
- "The Dancers"
- "The Judgment"
- "Danny's Wooing"
- "The Adventurers"
- "Dark Rosaleen"

== Critical reception ==
A reviewer in The Bulletin pointed out that, despite its title, this "book isn't all Ireland by any means. Some of it is Maoriland. Some of it is Fairyland. Some of it, being ocean, may be classed with the Kingdom of the Sealand which once led a precarious existence at the head of the Persian Gulf." They later went on to conclude that the poet "tries to make the globe feel happier with visions and dreams and patches of color and the harmonies of the clouds and the winds and the sea, and does the work well."

In The Australian Town and Country Journal a reviewer noted that with this volume the poet "provides an oasis of true poetry that stands out most refreshingly in the desert of jingle that has been extending rapidly during the last few years." They concluded that his "style is lyric rather than dramatic, but many a quiet touch shows that he can feel intensely as well as write musically."

== Notes ==
- Dedication: To a Scotchman for Ireland's sake. Bless the heather on both sides of Moyle Water.
- You are able to read the full text of the volume via the Internet Archive.

== See also ==
- 1918 in Australian literature
