= Dominion (poem) =

"Dominion" is a 1938 poem by the New Zealand writer A. R. D. Fairburn. It covers New Zealand and its national identity, in relation to its colonial history, political and economic realities, spirituality and nature. The tone alternates between satirical, tender and hopeful. It is divided into five major parts—"Utopia", "Album Leaves", "Elements", "Dialogue" and "Struggle in a Mirror"—with several further subsections.

It was published separately in 1938 and republished in 1952 in Three Poems, together with "The Voyage" and "To a Friend in the Wilderness".

== Reception ==
Marjorie J. Van Buren wrote in a 1964 Master of Arts thesis from the Kansas State University that "Fairburn's most extended criticism of New Zealand comes in Dominion, a long and rather uneven work", and that "in Dominion, as throughout his work, Fairburn shows his critical concern for the morality of his nation and his world and his stubborn faith in the eventual triumph—over complacency, greed, and fear—of man's hope in 'the promised good' which 'yet lives in us like a taper in the mouth of a snow-man,/our sole heritage of warmth and life'".

Fairburn's biographer Denys Trussell has called Dominion "arguably the most important political poem written in New Zealand".
