= Abd an-Nabi Abd al-Qadir Mursal =

Sudanese politician (1918–1962)

Abd an-Nabi Abd al-Qadir Mursal (Arabic: عبد النبي عبد القادر مرسال ;1918–1962) was a Sudanese poet and politician of Shilluk origin. His father was Shilluk and his mother Egyptian. He served as an army officer and government official. He was an Arabic-language poet.

He was a contributor to the Cairo literary weekly Al-Fajr. In 1937 he founded the Black Hand Society in Cairo, a first attempt to Black identity politics. However the Black Hand Society failed to gain traction as a political movement.

When the Black Bloc (a political organization striving to protect the interests of Black Sudanese) was formed in Omdurman in 1948, he became general secretary of the organization. He was one of the most prominent personalities of the Black Bloc in Wad Madani. In the 1953 legislative election he was elected to the House of Representatives from the Malakal and Renk constituency as a National Unionist Party candidate. He was appointed to the National Constitutional Commission.
