= Brendan Galvin =

American poet (1938–2023)

- Born: Brendan James Galvin; October 20, 1938
- Died: August 17, 2023 (aged 84)
- Occupation: Poet
- Spouse: Ellen

Brendan James Galvin (October 20, 1938 – August 17, 2023) was an American poet. His book, Habitat: New and Selected Poems 1965–2005, was a finalist for the 2005 National Book Award.

== Life ==
During forty years of college teaching, he served as Wyndham Robertson Visiting Writer in Residence in the MA program at Hollins University, Coal Royalty Distinguished Writer in Residence in the MFA program at the University of Alabama, Tuscaloosa, and Whichard chair in the Humanities at East Carolina University. His translation of Sophocles’ Women of Trachis appeared in the Penn Greek Drama Series in 1998.

He lived with his wife, Ellen, in Truro, Massachusetts, and died at 84 after suffering a heart attack in 2023.

== Awards ==
His narrative poem Hotel Malabar, winner of the 1997 Iowa Poetry Prize (University of Iowa Press, 1998). His awards include a Guggenheim Fellowship, two NEA fellowships, the Sotheby Prize of the Arvon Foundation (England), and Poetry’s Levinson Prize, the OB Hardison Jr. Poetry Prize from the Folger Shakespeare Library, and the Charity Randall Citation from the International Poetry Forum.

== Works ==
- "Ars Poetica: The Foxes". The New Yorker. January 2010.
- "Horse of Chernobyl, Horse of Lascaux". The Courtland Review. November 2007.
- "The Mice". The Atlantic. August 2007.
- "ROY OLAFSEN, CAPE COD CRAFTSPERSON, TELLS ALL". Swink. 2007.
- "Oyster Money (Winter 2006-7)". Ploughshares. Archived from the original on November 4, 2007.
- "Carolina Déjá Vu". Laurel Review. 2005.
- "Reading My Poems of Forty Years Ago; Furnishing Heaven; Yellow Shoe Poet". The Courtland Review; November 1999.
- "Rural Mailbox". Ploughshares. Spring 1984. Archived from the original on August 29, 2007.
- "Beachplums". Ploughshares. Spring 1984. Archived from the original on August 29, 2007.
- "Midden". Southern Review.
- "The March Observances". terrain.org.

=== Books ===
- Ocean Effects, Louisiana State University Press, 2007
- The Strength of a Named Thing, Louisiana State University Press
- Sky and Island Light, Louisiana State University Press
- Place keepers. LSU Press. 2003. ISBN 978-0-8071-2892-3.
- Galvin, Brendan (April 2005). Habitat: New and Selected Poems 1965-2005. LSU Press. ISBN 978-0-8071-3047-6.

== Reviews ==
Galvin is a poet who has published much but not too much; that is, many of the poems here are as fresh and powerful as the poems in such strong earlier collections as Atlantic Flyway, Seals in the Inner Harbor, and Winter Oysters. While Galvin continues to work the same material, he manages to make it new.
