= Julia Fields =

American writer and poet

Julia Fields (born January 21, 1938) is an American writer and poet.

Fields was born on January 21, 1938, in Bessemer, Alabama. Her father worked as a preacher, farmer, carpenter, and storekeeper. Fields' early jobs included selling vegetables, waitressing, and factory work, influences that later mingled in her writing with her immersion in African-American churches (their music as well as the lyrical qualities of scripture) and her early interests in botany and poetry. She attended the Presbyterian Knoxville College, graduating in 1961, then studied in at the University of Edinburgh in 1963. She met Langston Hughes in London and he became a mentor to her. In 1971, she earned a master's degree from Bread Loaf School of English at Middlebury College. She taught high school in Alabama as well as poetry and writing at Hampton Institute, East Carolina University, Howard University, and North Carolina State University.

Influenced by poets of the Harlem Renaissance like Hughes and Georgia Douglas Johnson, as well as black activists of 1960s, Fields published a collection Poems (1968), following a grant from the National Endowment for the Humanities; All Day Tomorrow (1966), a three-act play; East of Moonlight (1973); A Summoning, a Shining (1976); Slow Coins (1981); and The Green Lion of Zion Street (1988), a children's collection. In Southern Writers: A New Biographical Dictionary, Sara Andrews Johnston emphasized the thematic breadth of Fields' work, "hallowing the natural world, with farmers as poets, and criticizing a stultifying suburbia, hollow imitations of jazz, or obsessive materialism; they encompass love spent, outrage at lynching and other racial injustices, touching portraits of those in occupations limited by race, and a joyous cry of freedom from a lifestyle racially constricted, in 'High on the Hog.'"
