= C. H. Souter =

Scottish-Australian poet (1864–1944)

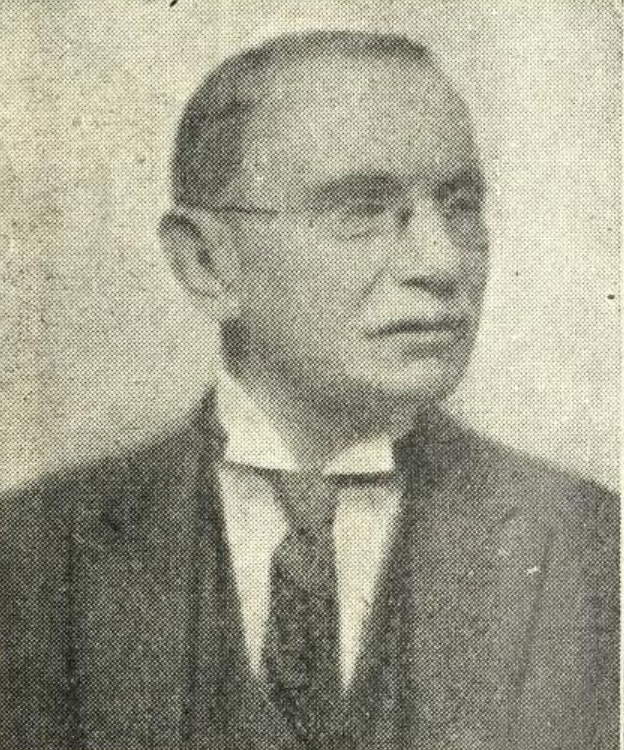
- Born: Charles Henry Souter; 11 October 1864; Aberdeen, Scotland
- Died: 20 August 1944 (aged 79); North Adelaide, South Australia
- Occupations: medical practitioner and poet
- Writing career
- Language: English
- Years active: 1888–1935

C. H. Souter (1864–1944) was a British/Australian medical practitioner and poet who was born in Aberdeen in Scotland. At the age of eight, in 1872, Souter's family moved to Nottingham, England, where he attended Highgate and University College Schools. His father, also a medical practitioner, became his supervisor when, at the age of 14, he was enrolled in the Royal College of Surgeons.

In March 1879 Souter's father John took his family to Sydney from where they settled in Coonabarabran. Souter returned to Aberdeen in 1882 to complete his medical studies. There he married Jane Ann Raeburn and the two returned to Australia where they settled in Hillston. Jane died after the birth of a daughter in 1889.

After a stint as a ship's surgeon, Souter went to Balaklava, South Australia, where he practised medicine from 1891 to 1905. He married Lucy de Neufoille Lucas in 1896 and, after finishing in Balaklava, he worked in a number of South Australian towns before settling in North Adelaide in 1925, where he remained until his death in 1944.

== Working life ==
Souter published his first short story in The Australian Town and Country Journal in 1888 and then didn't publish another until 1896, when his work — mainly poetry with an occasional short story — began to appear in The Bulletin.

A writer in The Oxford Companion to Australian Literature noted: "Souter wrote bush ballads and sea shanties as well as straightforward lyrical verse. His bush ballads, which reflect the daily life of the small farms of SA, are sensitive to the experience and idiom of a wide range of personalities, both male and female."

Besides his own name Souter also used the pseudonyms "Nil" and "Dr Nil" when publishing his work.

== Bibliography ==
=== Poetry collections ===
- Irish Lords and Other Verses (1912)
- To Many Ladies (And Others) (1917)
- The Mallee Fire and Other Verses (1923)
- The Lonely Rose, and Other Verses (1935)
