= Carlo Bordini =

Italian poet (1938–2020)

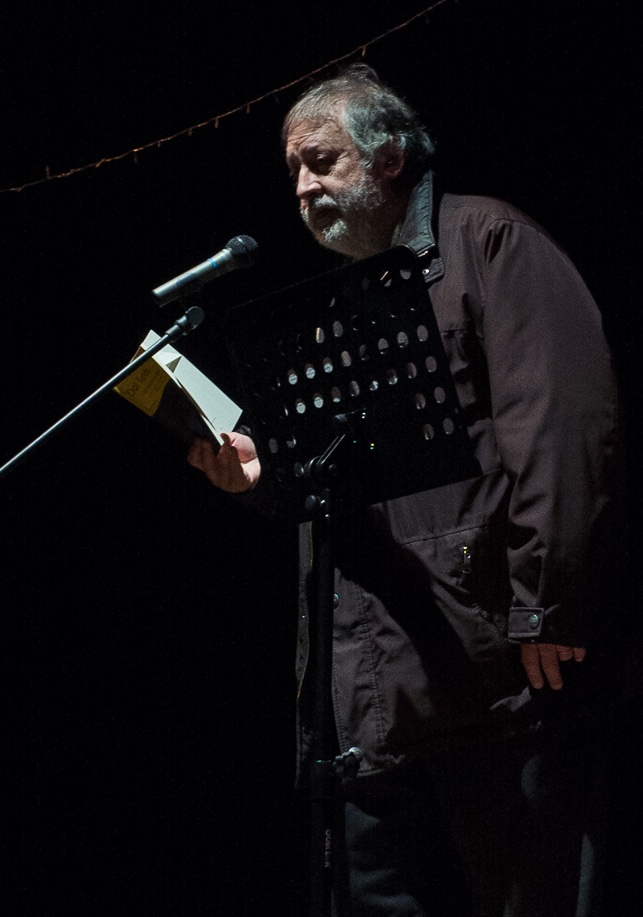
- Born: 2 September 1938; Rome
- Died: 10 November 2020 (aged 82); Rome
- Occupation: Poet

Carlo Bordini (2 September 1938 – 10 November 2020) was an Italian poet. He was born in Rome. His poetry had been translated into Spanish, French, and Swedish.

Bordini died from COVID-19 on 10 November 2020, at the age of 82.

== Bibliography ==
=== Poetry ===
- Strana categoria, Roma, Stampato in proprio, 1975.
- Poesie leggere, Siena, Barbablù, 1981.
- Strategia, Roma, Savelli, 1981.
- Pericolo, Reggio Emilia, Aelia Laelia, 1984.
- Mangiare, Roma, Empirìa, 1995.
- Polvere, Roma, Empirìa, 1999. A fragment in English: Dust.
- Purpureo nettare, Bergamo, Alla pasticceria del pesce, 2006.
- Sasso, Milano, Scheiwiller, 2008.
- Antologia: Pericolo, Poesie 1975-2001, San Cesario di Lecce, Manni, 2004.
- I costruttori di vulcani, Luca Sossella, Bologna, 2010.
- "New York" Italian original text and english version.

=== Prose ===
- Manuale di autodistruzione, Roma, Fazi, 1998 (ristampato nel 2004). ISBN 9788881120697
- Pezzi di ricambio, Roma, Empirìa, 2003. ISBN 9788887450262
- Gustavo, una malattia mentale, Roma, Avagliano, 2006 (novel).
- Dal fondo, la poesia dei marginali, Rome, Savelli, 1978 (ristampato da Avagliano nel 2007). A cura di Carlo Bordini e Antonio Veneziani.
- Renault 4, Scrittori a Roma prima della morte di Moro, Roma, Avagliano, 2007. A cura di Carlo Bordini e Andrea di Consoli.
- Non è un gioco, appunti di viaggio sulla poesia in America Latina, Roma, Luca Sossella editore, 2008.
