= G. H. Gibson =

Australian poet

George Herbert Gibson (28 August 1846 – 18 June 1921) was an Anglo-Australian writer of humorous ballads and verse. He is better known by his pen name, Ironbark.

Gibson was born in Plymouth, England, where his father was a solicitor. Gibson also qualified as a solicitor in 1868 but the next year he decided to emigrate to New Zealand, soon crossing the Tasman to settle in New South Wales.

In Sydney Gibson pursued a career in the Lands Department initially as a temporary clerk in June 1876. He was later appointed to the permanent staff on 1 January 1877, a job that allowed him to tour the Outback and regional areas of the colony and gain a strong impression of the culture and characters of the Bush. His knowledge of the hardships on the land and the trials of the selectors informs much of his humorous verse. This tendency is seen in the following extract from Nursery Rhymes for Infant Pastoralists:

Baa, baa, black sheep
Have you any wool?
Yes, sir, oh, yes, sir! three bales full.
One for the master who grows so lean and lank;
None for the mistress,
But two for the Bank!

Like his more well-known contemporary, A. B. 'Banjo' Paterson, much of Gibson's best work appeared in the strongly nativist Sydney Bulletin. He had no pretension about his work, describing it in the preface to Ironbark Splinters as "the lightest of light reading" and only "the thistledown and cobwebs" of Australian literature.

Gibson died in Lindfield, Sydney, at the age of 74.

== Works ==
- Southerly Busters (1878)
- Old Friends under New Aspects (1883)
- Ironbark Chips and Stockwhip Cracks (1893) – illustrations by Percy Spence and Alf Vincent
- Ironbark Splinters from the Australian Bush (1912)
