= The Lilt of Life =

1918 poetry collection by Zora Cross

- Author: Zora Cross
- Language: English
- Genre: Poetry collection
- Publisher: Angus & Robertson
- Publication date: 1918
- Publication place: Australia
- Media type: Print
- Pages: 155 pp.

The Lilt of Life is a collection of poetry by Australian writer Zora Cross, published by Angus and Robertson in 1897.

It contains 68 poems. A note from the author in the book states: "Several of the poems contained in this volume have appeared in The Bulletin; one in The Lone Hand; the remainder are here published for the first time. Z. C."

== Contents ==
- "The Lilt of Life"
- "Man and Woman"
- "Sonnets of Motherhood I"
- "Sonnets of Motherhood II"
- "Sonnets of Motherhood III"
- "Sonnets of Motherhood IV"
- "Sonnets of Motherhood V"
- "Sonnets of Motherhood VI"
- "Sonnets of Motherhood VII"
- "Sonnets of Motherhood VIII"
- "Sonnets of Motherhood IX"
- "Sonnets of Motherhood X"
- "Sonnets of Motherhood XI"
- "Sonnets of Motherhood XII"
- "Sonnets of Motherhood XIII"
- "Sonnets of Motherhood XIV"
- "Sonnets of Motherhood XV"
- "Sonnets of Motherhood XVI"
- "Sonnets of Motherhood XVII"
- "Sonnets of Motherhood XVIII"
- "Sonnets of Motherhood : XIX"
- "Sonnets of Motherhood XX"
- "Sonnets of Motherhood XXI"
- "Sonnets of Motherhood XXII"
- "Sonnets of Motherhood XXIII"
- "Sonnets of Motherhood XXIV"
- "Sonnets of Motherhood XXV"
- "Sonnets of Motherhood XXVI"
- "Sonnets of Motherhood XXVII"
- "Sonnets of Motherhood XXVIII"
- "Sonnets of Motherhood XXIX"
- "Sonnets of Motherhood XXX"
- "Sonnets of Motherhood XXXI"
- "Sonnets of Motherhood XXXII"
- "Sonnets of Motherhood XXXIII"
- "Sonnets of Motherhood XXXIV"
- "Sonnets of Motherhood XXXV"
- "Sonnets of Motherhood XXXVI"
- "Sonnets of Motherhood XXXVII"
- "Sonnets of Motherhood XXXVIII"
- "Sonnets of Motherhood XXXIX"
- "Sonnets of Motherhood XL"
- "Sonnets of Motherhood XLI"
- "Sonnets of Motherhood XLII"
- "Sonnets of Motherhood XLIII"
- "Sonnets of Motherhood XLIV"
- "Sonnets of Motherhood XLV"
- "Columbine"
- "Heart's Desire"
- "Australia in England"
- "Wishes"
- "Woman"
- "Gipsy-Joy"
- "Fairy Ride"
- "The Magic Fiddler"
- "The Land of Heart's Desire"
- "Sleep"
- "Child Song"
- "Spirits of the Street"
- "An Early Moon"
- "Tinker Time"
- "Little Bo-Peep"
- "Love's Evolution"
- "Fragment"
- "Numerals"
- "Happy Song"
- "Helen in Hyde Park"
- "A Wedding Song"

== Critical reception ==
In a review of the collection in The Bulletin a critic noted that "the work throughout is on a very high level, and marks a distinct advance on that published last year", referring to the poet's earlier collection Songs of Love and Life.

A reviewer in The Sydney Morning Herald called Cross "one of the most individual of our singers", noting that "she has an almost pagan zest in existence and appreciation of beauty in all its forms." They called out "the very fine sonnect sequence on 'Motherhood', in which a wealth of tenderness and feeling is expressed in language that is often of singular beauty."

== Note ==
- You can read a digitised version of the collection from the State Library of NSW.

== See also ==
- 1918 in Australian literature
