= The Bookfellow =

Australian magazine (1899–1925)

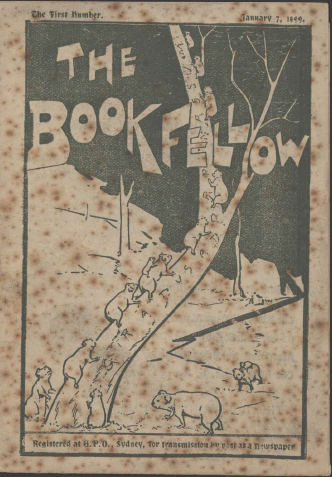
The Bookfellow magazine, Front cover, January 7, 1899.

The Bookfellow was a monthly English-language journal published in Sydney, New South Wales, Australia. The publication's focus was Australian literature and editions were often accompanied by illustrations.

== History ==
The Bookfellow was published in Sydney, by William Macleod from January 1899 to May 1899. Journalist A. G. Stephens, one of Australia's most influential critics, had made several attempts at producing a literary magazine for Australians. In 1894, he was recruited by J. F. Archibald for the weekly Bulletin. He claimed the inside cover of the magazine for reviewing books and relaying literary gossip to interested readers. This section of the Bulletin came to be known as the ‘Red Page.’

Stephens assisted many emerging Australian writers by featuring their work on the ‘Red Page.’ In 1898, he convinced the owners of The Bulletin to sponsor a small magazine to increase the scope of the ‘Red Page.’ In January 1899, the first issue of The Bookfellow was published.

The magazine actively promoted Australian writing and set out to educate Australian readers about developments in literature occurring overseas. The first issue, was subtitled ‘A monthly Magazine for Book Buyers and Book-Readers.’

Those who wrote for the publication included Barcroft Boake, Christopher Brennan, Mary Hannay Foott, A. G. Stephens and A. J. Fischer.

The magazine ceased after 5 issues, in May 1899. Stephens returned to the ‘Red Page,’ but following a souring of his relationship with new Bulletin editor, James Edmonds, Stephens left The Bulletin in November 1906 to open a small bookshop that he called "The Bookfellow." He resurrected The Bookfellow as a weekly magazine in January 1907; however, neither the bookshop, nor the magazine would see the year out.

The Bookfellow was revived again in the 1920s and ceased finally in 1925, but continued to operate as a publisher of books into the 1930s.

== Digitisation ==
The journal has been digitised in Trove by the National Library of Australia
