= James Devaney =

Australian writer

James Martin Devaney (31 May 1890 – 14 August 1976) was an Australian poet, novelist, and journalist.

== Biography ==
Born in Bendigo, Victoria in 1890, Devaney attended St. Joseph's College, Hunters Hill, entering the Marist Brothers juniorate in 1904. He took his vows in 1915. He moved to Queensland in 1921 after leaving the order due to contracting tuberculosis. He pursued writing and journalism. Under the pen-name 'Fabian', he contributed between 1924 and 1943 a nature column to the Brisbane Courier (renamed The Courier-Mail after 1933). He also wrote a regular literary column for the Catholic Leader.

Devaney was active in literary circles in the 1930s and 1940s. He was president of the Queensland Authors' and Artists' Association from 1944 to 1945 (later known as the Fellowship of Australian Writers or FAW). After World War II, he returned to teaching working on pastoral stations in Victoria and Queensland.

== Personal life ==
Devaney married Phyllis de Winton in 1924. He died in Brisbane on 14 August 1976 and was buried at Redcliffe Cemetery. Several boxes of his papers can be accessed from the Fryer Library at The University of Queensland Library.

== Works ==
- Fabian: Poems, Melbourne: Lothian, 1923
- The Currency Lass: a Tale of the Convict Days, Sydney: Cornstalk, 1927
- The Vanished Tribes, Sydney: Cornstalk, 1929
- The Girl Oona, and Other Tales of the Australian Blacks, Sydney: Cornstalk Publishing Co., 1929
- The Witch-Doctor, and Other Tales of the Australian Blacks, Sydney: Angus and Robertson, 1930
- I-rinka the Messenger, and Other Tales of the Australian Blacks, Sydney: Angus and Robertson, 1930
- Earth Kindred, Melbourne: Frank Wilmot, Coles Library, 1931
- Debutantes: a poem, Hawthorn East, Victoria: The Hawthorn Press, (1939?)
- Dark Road, Hawthorn East, Victoria: Hawthorn Press, 1938,
- Where the Wind Goes, Sydney: Angus and Robertson, 1939
- Shaw Neilson, Sydney: Angus and Robertson, 1944
- Washdirt: a novel of old Bendigo, Melbourne: Georgian House, 1946
- Poems, Sydney: Angus and Robertson, 1950
- Poetry In Our Time, Melbourne: Melbourne University Press, 1952
