= David McKee Wright =

Australian/New Zealand poet

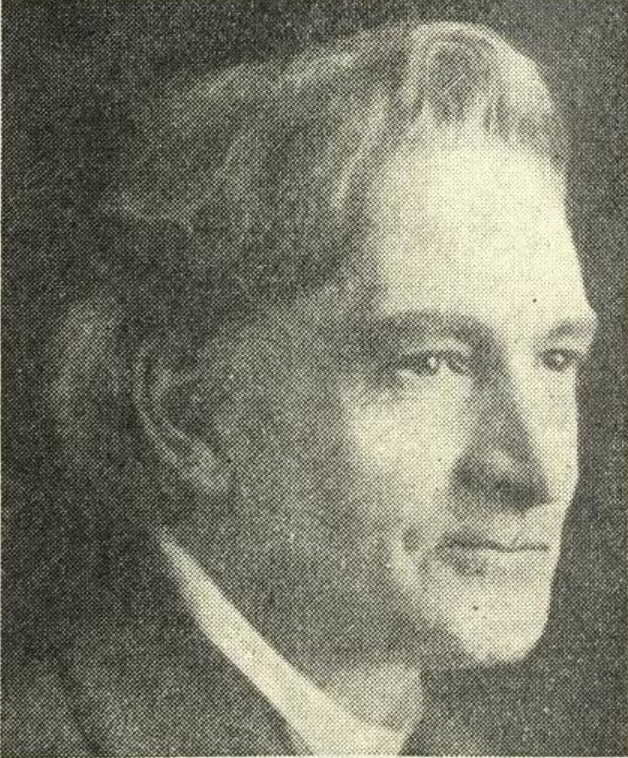
- Born: 6 August 1869; County Down, Ireland
- Died: 5 February 1928 (aged 58); Blue Mountains, Australia
- Occupations: Poet, journalist

David McKee Wright (6 August 1869 – 5 February 1928) was an Irish-born poet and journalist, active in New Zealand and Australia.

== Early life ==
Wright was born at Ballynaskeagh, County Down, Ireland, the second son of Rev. William Wright, D.D. (1837–1899), a Congregational missionary working in Damascus, scholar and author, and his wife Ann (d.1877), née McKee, daughter of the Rev. David McKee, an educationist and author. Wright was educated at the local Glascar School and then from 1876 in England at Mr Pope's School and the Crystal Palace School of Engineering, London.

== New Zealand ==
Wright migrated to New Zealand in 1887 and spent several years as a rabbiter on stations in Central Otago. During this time he wrote in both prose and verse for major provincial newspapers about station life. He studied for the Congregational ministry and Wright studied divinity from 1896 at the University of Otago. Wright had done a lot of private reading, but found that apart from English his education was generally below that of the other students. In 1897 Wright was awarded a Stuart prize for poetry. Wright published four volumes of ballads, Aorangi and other Verses (1896), Station Ballads and other Verses (1897), Wisps of Tussock (1900), and New Zealand Chimes (1900).

Wright married Elizabeth Couper at Dunedin on 3 August 1899; a son David was born in 1900, but the marriage failed. Wright joined the New Zealand Mail as parliamentary reporter in 1907.

== Australia ==
Wright by David Low

Wright moved to Sydney in 1910. From 1912 to 1918 Wright lived with the writer 'Margaret Fane' (Beatrice Florence Osborne, 1887–1962) in Sydney; they had four sons. From 1918 Wright lived with Zora Cross in Greeanawn, Glenbrook, Blue Mountains. He died there on 5 February 1928. The couple had two daughters, Davidina Wright and April McKee Wright (also known as April Hersey), who went on to write at least one wartime thriller.

== Legacy ==
Wright was a friend of Christopher Brennan, Randolph Bedford, Frank Morton and Henry Lawson.

== Bibliography ==
=== Poetry ===
- Aorangi and Other Verses (1896)
- Station Ballads and Other Verses (1897)
- New Zealand Chimes (1900)
- Wisps of Tussock: New Zealand Rhymes (1900)
- An Irish Heart (1918)
- The Station Ballads and Other Verses (1945)

=== Fiction ===
- Luta of Lutetia (1930) - romance, with Zora Cross
- The Little Girl Who Didn't Live Next Door (1930) - children's
