= Shaw Neilson =

Australian poet (1872–1942)

John Shaw Neilson
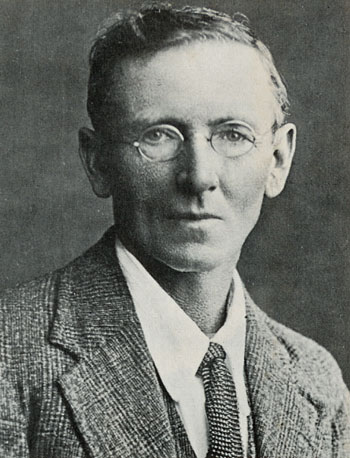
- Born: John Shaw Neilson; 22 February 1872; Penola, South Australia, Australia
- Died: 12 May 1942 (aged 70); Melbourne, Victoria, Australia
- Occupation: Poet
- Writing career
- Period: 1896–1938
- Genre: Lyric poetry
- Notable work: "The Orange Tree"

John Shaw Neilson (22 February 1872 – 12 May 1942) was an Australian poet.

For most of his life, Neilson was a labourer, fruit-picking, clearing scrub, navvying and working in quarries, and after 1928, working as a messenger with the Country Roads Board in Melbourne. Largely untrained and only basically educated, Neilson became known as one of Australia's finest lyric poets, who wrote a great deal about the natural world and its beauty.

== Early life ==
Neilson was born on 22 February 1872, in Penola, South Australia.

== Poetry ==
A number of Neilson's poems were set to music by composers such as Margaret Sutherland, Alfred Hill, Cathie O'Sullivan, Llew and Mara Kiek, Richard Keam and Darryl Emmerson. The latter's play, The Pathfinder, based on the life and writings of Neilson, enjoyed much success in the 1980s, toured twice, was produced for radio by the Australian Broadcasting Commission, and published by Currency Press, Sydney, in 1987.

== Later life and legacy ==
In 1946, a bronze sculpture of the poet was commissioned for the opening of the Footscray Children's Library in Buckley Street. The sculpture, by Wallace Anderson, is still on display at the Footscray Library in Paisley Street. The Maribyrnong Library Service, who now run the Footscray Library, holds an archive, the John Shaw Neilson Collection. There is also a local John Shaw Neilson Society.

In 1964, the Nhill and District Historical Society erected a monument to Neilson. In 1972 the cottage birthplace of Neilson was relocated from Penola to a park in Nhill, as the John Shaw Neilson National Memorial Cottage.

Since 1970, the Fellowship of Australian Writers has presented an annual award, the FAW John Shaw Neilson Poetry Award, for unpublished poems of at least 14 lines.

Since 2005, the Penola Coonawarra Arts Festival have hosted the John Shaw Neilson Art Prize, for visual works inspired by the poet.

Despite Melbourne's strong literary tradition, there are no Melbourne suburbs named after writers. There was a campaign in 2009 to name a new suburb after Neilson.

== Works ==
- Old Granny Sullivan (poems), Sydney, Bookfellow, 1915.
- Heart of Spring (poems), Sydney, Bookfellow, 1919.
- Ballad and Lyrical Poems, Sydney, Bookfellow, 1923.
- New Poems, Sydney, Bookfellow, 1927.
- Collected Poems of John Shaw Neilson, edited and with introduction by R. H. Croll, Melbourne, Lothian, 1934.
- Beauty Imposes : Some Recent Verse, Angus and Robertson, 1938.
- Unpublished Poems, edited by James Devaney, Angus and Robertson, 1947.
- Shaw Neilson: poetry selections, selected and introduced by Judith Wright, Angus and Robertson, 1963.
- The Poems of Shaw Neilson, edited and introduction by A. R. Chisholm, Angus and Robertson, 1965, revised edition, 1973.
- Witnesses of Spring, edited by Judith Wright and Val Vallis, Angus and Robertson, 1970.
- Selected Poems, edited by A. R. Chisholm, Angus and Robertson, 1976.
- Green Days and Cherries: The Early Verse of Shaw Neilson, edited by Hugh Anderson and Leslie James Blake, Red Rooster Press, 1981.
- Some Poems of John Shaw Neilson: Selected and With Wood-Engravings, Canberra, Brindabella Press, 1984.
- John Shaw Neilson: Poetry, Autobiography, and Correspondence, edited by Cliff Hanna, University of Queensland Press, 1991.
- Selected Poems, edited by Robert Gray, Angus and Robertson, 1991.
- The Sun Is Up: Selected Poems, Loch Haven Books, 1991.
- Collected Verse of John Shaw Neilson, edited by Margaret Roberts, University of Western Australia Publishing, 2012.
- Collected Poems of John Shaw Neilson, edited by Robert Dixon, Sydney University Press, 2013

=== Selected list of poems ===
Title	Year	First published	Reprinted/collected in
"Heart of Spring!"	1909	The Register, 20 February 1909,	Heart of Spring, Bookfellow, 1919, p. 1
"Love's Coming"	1911	The Daily Herald, 13 May 1911,	Heart of Spring, Bookfellow, 1919, p. 40
"Song Be Delicate"	1913	The Bookfellow, 15 November 1913	Heart of Spring, Bookfellow, 1919, p. 3
"The Break of Day"	1918	The Oxford Book of Australasian Verse edited by Walter Murdoch	Heart of Spring, Bookfellow, 1919, p. 29
"The Orange Tree"	1921	The Bookfellow, 15 February 1921	Collected Poems of John Shaw Neilson edited by R. H. Croll, Lothian, 1934, pp. 100-101
"The Gentle Water Bird"	1926	The Sydney Morning Herald, 10 April 1926	New Poems, Bookfellow, 1927, pp. 34-35
"Beauty Imposes"	1938		Beauty Imposes : Some Recent Verse, Angus and Robertson, 1938, p. 34
"The Crane is My Neighbour"	1938		Beauty Imposes : Some Recent Verse, Angus and Robertson, 1938, pp. 14-15
"The Poor Can Feed the Birds"	1938		Beauty Imposes : Some Recent Verse, Angus and Robertson, 1938, pp. 28-29

== Biographies ==
- John Shaw Neilson: a memorial, J. Roy Stevens, Bread and Cheese Club, 1942
- Shaw Neilson, James Devaney, Angus and Robertson, 1944
- Shaw Neilson, H.J. Oliver, Oxford University Press, 1968
- John Shaw Neilson, Hugh Anderson and L.J. Blake, Rigby, 1972
- Neilson, John Shaw (1978). The Autobiography of John Shaw Neilson, introduction by Nancy Keesing (PDF). National Library of Australia. ISBN 0-642-99116-2.
- The Pathfinder, Darryl Emmerson, Currency Press, 1987
- Poet of the Colours: The Life of John Shaw Neilson, John H. Phillips, Allen and Unwin, 1988
- The Folly of Spring: A Study of John Shaw Neilson's Poetry, Cliff Hanna, University of Queensland Press, 1990
- John Shaw Neilson: Poetry, Autobiography and Correspondence, edited by Cliff Hanna, University of Queensland Press, 1991
- Jock: A Life Story of John Shaw Neilson, Cliff Hanna, University of Queensland Press, 1999
- John Shaw Neilson: A Life in Letters, Helen Hewson, Melbourne University Press, 2001
