= Zora Cross =

Australian poet, novelist, journalist (1890–1964)

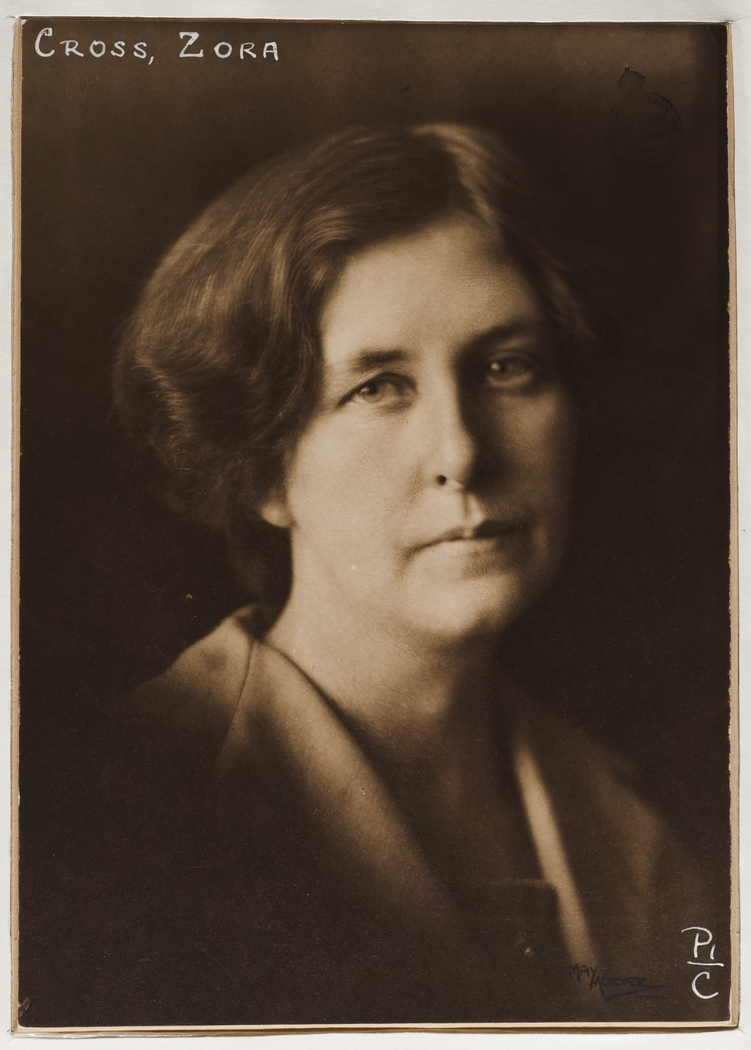
- Born: Zora Bernice May Cross; 18 May 1890; Eagle Farm, Queensland, Australia
- Died: 22 January 1964 (aged 73); Glenbrook, New South Wales, Australia
- Other names: Bernice May, Rosa Carmen
- Education: Ipswich Girls' Grammar School; Sydney Girls' High School; Burwood Superior Public School; Sydney Teachers' College
- Occupations: poet and novelist
- Known for: Songs of Love and Life
- Spouses: Stuart Smith (m. 1911; div. 1922) David Wright (m. 1923; died 1928)
- Children: 3
- Parent(s): Ernest William Cross (accountant) and Mary Louisa Eliza Ann, nee Skyring

Zora Bernice May Cross (18 May 1890 – 22 January 1964) was an Australian poet, best-selling novelist and journalist.

== Life ==
Cross was born on 18 May 1890 at Eagle Farm, Brisbane, to Sydney-born accountant Ernest William Cross and Mary Louisa Eliza Ann Cross. Cross published and was known for her serialised novels, books of poems and children's verse and inherited her love for literature from both her parents. She was educated at Ipswich Girls' Grammar School, Burwood Public School, Sydney Girls' High School and then Sydney Teachers' College from 1909 to 1910. As a child, Cross was a prolific contributor to the Children's Corner in the Australian Town and Country Journal, where she attracted the attention of the editor Ethel Turner, who became a significant friend and mentor throughout Cross's writing career.

Cross combined her teaching career with writing and acting, including tours with Cherry Abraham's Comedy Costume Company in Queensland and with J. C. Williamson's theatre company. On 11 March 1911, she married fellow actor Stuart Smith but later refused to live with him. The marriage was dissolved on 10 September 1922. In September 1914, she gave birth to a son, Normand (later known as Teddy), at Lauriston Private Hospital, Mosman, but no father was listed on the birth certificate. She taught for three years and then worked as a journalist for The Boomerang, and subsequently as a freelance writer.

By this time, Cross had formed a lasting relationship with the writer David McKee Wright, whom she married in 1923. They lived in the Blue Mountains village of Glenbrook where they had two daughters, Davidina and Maeve (known as April).

Cross Street in the Canberra suburb of Cook is named in her honour.

== Work ==
In 1916, Cross submitted her first novel, on an Aboriginal theme but the publisher refused to publish this work. That same year a book of poems, A Song of Mother Love, was published.

In 1917, Cross publishedSongs of Love and Life, some of which had already appeared in The Bulletin, which was highly influential in Australian culture and politics until after the First World War, and was then noted for its nationalist, pro-labour, and pro-republican, writing. This book and her book of similar poems, The Lilt of Life in 1918, both published by Angus & Robertson, were an expression of her love for David McKee Wright. Songs of Love and Life attracted widespread attention because of its erotic content and sold out in three days.

In 1918, Cross wrote the children's verse The City of Riddle-mee-ree (1918), illustrated by Olive Crane, and then the more sombre Elegy on an Australian Schoolboy (1921), in memory of her 19-year-old soldier brother, John Skyring Cross.

Her 1924 book Daughters of the Seven Mile illustrated her awareness of developing social and economic stresses in Australia.

Cross wrote on subjects controversial at the time such as sex, childbirth, Aboriginal communities and the effects of war on women who are left behind.

As "Bernice May", "Rosa Carmen" and "Daisy M.", Cross contributed regularly in the 1930s to the Australian Women's Mirror. As Bernice May she wrote a significant series of interviews with contemporary Australian women writers.

In later years, Cross drew on a lifetime interest in Ancient Rome and Julius Caesar. Her novel The Victor was serialised in the Sydney Morning Herald in 1933 and received favourable reviews.

Throughout her life, Cross supported herself and her children by acting, teaching and as a freelance journalist. The Commonwealth Literary Fund (precursor to the Australia Council for the Arts), prompted by the Fellowship of Australian Writers, awarded her a pension.

== Bibliography ==
=== Novels ===
- Daughters of the Seven Mile, London: Hutchinson (1924)
- The Lute-Girl of Rainyvale, London: Hutchinson (1925)
- Sons of the Seven Mile, Sydney Mail (1927)
- Moonstone Luck, Sydney Morning Herald (1930)
- The Victor, Sydney Morning Herald (1933)
- This Hectic Age, Sydney: London Book Co. (1944) also published as Night Side of Sydney

=== Poetry collections ===
- A Song of Mother Love (1916)
- Songs of Love and Life (1917)
- The Lilt of Life (1918)
- The City of Riddle-Me-Ree (1918)
- Elegy on an Australian Schoolboy, Sydney: Angus & Robertson (1921)

=== Lyrics ===
Dream travel two-part song (1937)

=== Non-fiction ===
An Introduction to the Study of Australian Literature: Teachers' College Press (1922)
