= No Foe Shall Gather Our Harvest =

Poem by Mary Gilmore

- by Mary Gilmore
- First published in: The Australian Women's Weekly
- Country: Australia
- Language: English
- Publication date: 29 June 1940
- Preceded by: Battlefields (poetry collection)
- Followed by: "Notes" (column)

"No Foe Shall Gather Our Harvest" is a poem by Australian poet Mary Gilmore. It was first published in The Australian Women's Weekly on 29 June 1940, and later in the poet's collection Fourteen Men. The final two stanzas from the poem appear as microtext on the Australian ten-dollar note.

== Outline ==
The poem is a "call to arms" to Australians, not in the sense of taking up weapons but more as a call to stand firm in the face of foreign aggression. Each stanza ends with the same two lines (italicised in the original publication): "No foe shall gather our harvest/Or sit on our stockyard rail."

== Analysis ==
The Oxford Companion to Australian Literature notes that at the time of publication, the poem "proved a remarkable morale booster in the tense days of the Japanese threat to Australia in 1942." They also note that it "was at the time considered as a possible battle hymn, even national anthem."

== Further publications ==
- Fourteen Men by Mary Gilmore (1954)
- The Bulletin, 22 July 1980, p79
- Two Centuries of Australian Poetry edited by Kathrine Bell (2007)
- The Book of Australian Popular Rhymed Verse : A Classic Collection of Entertaining and Recitable Poems and Verse : From Henry Lawson to Barry Humphries edited by Jim Haynes (2013)

== See also ==
- 1940 in poetry
- 1940 in literature
- 1940 in Australian literature
- Australian literature
