= The Barrier Miner =

Former daily newspaper in NSW, Australia

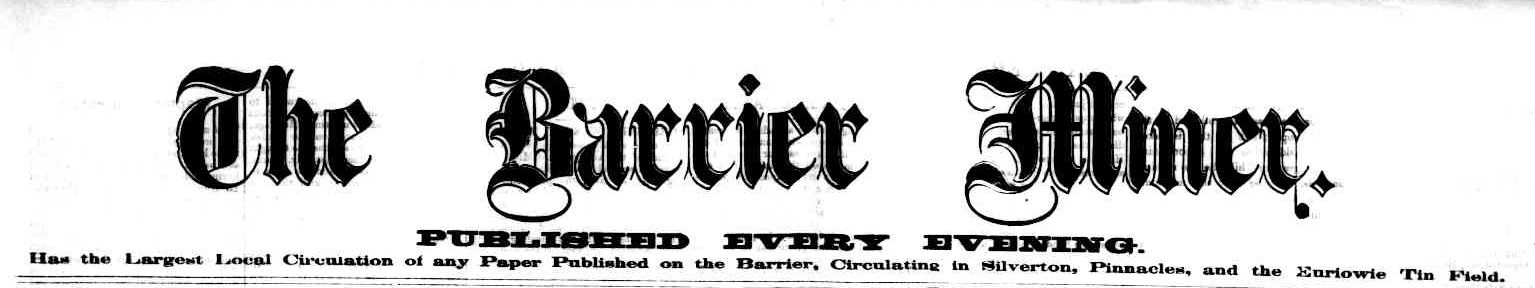

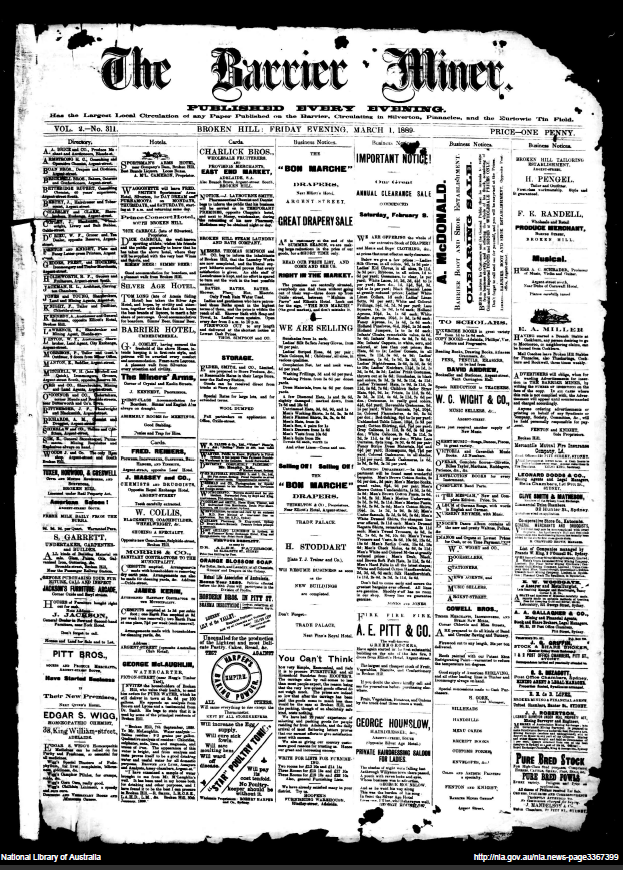
- Type: Daily newspaper
- Format: Tabloid
- Owner(s): Henry Fenton, Augustus Sydney Knight and George Alfred Mills, 1888-[1974]
- Editor: Samuel Prior 1889
- Founded: 1888
- ISSN: 1837-3100

The Barrier Miner was a daily broadsheet newspaper published in Broken Hill in far western New South Wales from 1888 to 1974, and again from 2005 to 2008.

== History ==
First published on 28 February 1888, The Barrier Miner was published continuously until 25 November 1974. Copies are available on microfilm and online via Trove Digitised Newspapers. The paper was revived briefly in 2005; an index to births deaths and marriages has been prepared which also notes additional publication dates between 16 December 2005 and 31 July 2008. The paper closed down for a second time in 2008 with the managing director, Margaret McBride stating that "...due to commercial reasons the paper would no longer service Broken Hill and the region...". The Barrier Miner served the growing mining community of Broken Hill, when the area was found to have lead ore and traces of silver. It was not until late 1884 or early 1885 that rich quantities of silver were found and the Broken Hill Proprietary Company (BHP) was floated to mine the leases. The newspaper was published by Henry Fenton, Augustus Sydney Knight and George Alfred Mills and was distributed to Broken Hill, Tibooburra, White Cliffs, Wilcannia, Menindee, Ivanhoe. It was edited by Samuel Prior from 1888, who was also a partner (with a one-seventh share) with the main proprietors in 1905, Knight and Von Rieben Ltd. who took over in about 1890 when Fenton and Mills sold their interests. Prior may have been one of the youngest editors of a daily newspaper in Australia. He later wrote the Wild Cats column at The Bulletin, where he was later appointed editor, and was its main proprietor when he died in 1933.

E. R. Kellsall took over as editor after Prior left, with Mr R.D.S. Magnusson as sub-editor. The newspaper was originally published and printed from a building in Argent Street, occupying a galvanised iron clad shed. In 1908 a substantial stone building was erected by F.J. Fairweather and Sons on the corner of Blende and Sulphide Streets.

Knight and Von Rieben retired in 1907 to Adelaide and Sydney respectively, when John Smethurst (a building contractor who erected the Broken Hill Town Hall) took over as managing editor, remained in charge up to 1933 when J. F. Williams took over. E. K. Lean, joined the staff in 1893 and became assistant manager in 1918. A Sunday evening special edition was published during the 1914-1918 war featuring letters from overseas soldiers with many eager residents rushing the office for copies as soon as they came off the presses. The newspaper office was twice bombed during World War I, it is believed because of some comments made about unpatriotic behaviour in the town, which was not taken well by the strong unionised workforce. Daily circulation reached 8303 in 1905, with three editions published up to about 1922 (at 1 p.m., 3:00-3:30 p.m. and 6:00-6:30 p.m.) the first and third editions being sold in Argent Street and the second edition being home delivered.

James Davison (1848–1929) (managing editor of the Melbourne Herald) took over the paper in 1919, along with the Port Pirie Recorder. He left in 1922 to start the Adelaide News (the paper that gave Murdoch's News Limited its start). Competition came in 1919 with the addition of the Barrier Daily Truth.

== Digitisation ==
The paper has been digitised as part of the Australian Newspapers Digitisation Program project of the National Library of Australia. The microfilm copies are held in the collection of the State Library of New South Wales.

== See also ==
- List of newspapers in Australia
- List of newspapers in New South Wales
