= The Brucedale Scandal =

Poem by Mary Gilmore

- by Mary Gilmore
- First published in: The Bulletin
- Country: Australia
- Language: English
- Publication date: 18 December 1924

"The Brucedale Scandal" is a poem by Australian poet Mary Gilmore. It was originally published in The Bulletin on 18 December 1924, and later in the poet's collection The Tilted Cart : A Book of Recitations, and other Australian poetry anthologies.

== Outline ==
"Himself and me" go out for a ride on his horse-and-trap to the visiting circus, and before they have even made it home rumours are circulating around the neighbourhood about their scandalous behaviour.

== Critical analysis ==
In his review of The Collected Verse of Mary Gilmore : Volume One 1887-1929 Philip Butterss called the poem a "fine ballad", which the editor of the volume Jennifer Strauss "rightly places in the best of the Australian ballad tradition."

== Further publications ==
- The Tilted Cart : A Book of Recitations by Mary Gilmore, 1925
- The Illustrated Treasury of Australian Verse edited by Beatrice Davis, Nelson, 1984
- The Collected Verse of Mary Gilmore : Volume One 1887-1929 edited by Jennifer Strauss, University of Queensland Press, 2004
- 100 Australian Poems You Need to Know edited by Jamie Grant, Hardie Grant, 2008
- Australian Poetry Since 1788 edited by Geoffrey Lehmann and Robert Gray, University of NSW Press, 2011

== Note ==
- Gilmore lived for a time on Brucedale Road near Wagga Wagga in New South Wales. Gilmore has written that this poem is about her mother and father.

== See also ==
- 1924 in poetry
- 1924 in literature
- 1924 in Australian literature
- Australian literature
