= The Tilted Cart : A Book of Recitations =

1925 Australian poetry collection by Mary Gilmore

- Author: Mary Gilmore
- Language: English
- Genre: Poetry collection
- Publisher: Workers Trade Union Print
- Publication date: 1925
- Publication place: Australia
- Media type: Print
- Pages: 115 pp

The Tilted Cart : A Book of Recitations is a collection of poems by Australian poet Mary Gilmore, published by Worker Trade Union Print in 1925.

The collection contains 43 poems with the majority of them being published here for the first time.

== Contents ==
- "My Scattered Flock"
- "The Hunted Man"
- "The Old House Over the Way"
- "The Willow Tree Inn"
- "The Glory-Box"
- "The Fetter-Lock of Home"
- "The Dream of Ellen"
- "The Saturday Tub"
- "Second-Hand Beds"
- "A Common Story"
- "Doing the Boots for Sundayi"
- "The Currajong of Remembrance"
- "The Square Peg and the Round"
- "Big Simon"
- "Poor Susan"
- "Scotty Robertson"
- "The Settler's Wife"
- "Ann"
- "'Retired'"
- "Paddy Duveen"
- "The Song of the Waler"
- "Himself and His Story"
- "The Old and the Young"
- "The Countess of X ****"
- "Taffety Silk"
- "The Light On Her Hair"
- "Paddy Mannion's Song of the Road"
- "The Roads That Led to Anzac"
- "Boots"
- "The Waratah"
- "The Pram With a Little Wee Tilt"
- "The Sisters"
- "The Brucedale Scandal"
- "Old Anthony Stinson's Shepherd"
- "In Wagga Wagga, Long Ago"
- "In Wesleyan Days, Wagga Wagga"
- "The Road to Gunning"
- "The Tin Pannikin"
- "The Tilted Cart"
- "The Old Station Needle-Woman"
- "Bells and Bullocks"
- "The Teamsters"
- "When Time Measures My Award"

== Critical reception ==
In The Australian Worker poet R. J. Cassidy called this "an intimate book", going on to point out that it "is soulfully suggestive, significant, and descriptive of the Bush. It introduces one to the people of the homes surrounded, by eucalypti or ironbark, with more alluring greenery vouchsafed, by the willow or the gold given by the wattle."

David McKee Wright, reviewing the collection for The Bulletin magazine said of the poet that her "singing has, at its best, a strength and an original force unlike that of any other woman writer here or elsewhere; and while she often defies acknowledged rule and form, there is generally a musical quality even in her most irregular lines." Wright went on to state that this volume contains more than poems worthy of recitation, commenting that there "is a great deal of poetry in the volume; it gets well below the surface of things and often touches real emotions hidden under the disguises of every day."

== See also ==
- 1925 in Australian literature
