= The Passionate Heart (collection) =

1918 Australian poetry collection by Mary Gilmore

- Author: Mary Gilmore
- Language: English
- Genre: Poetry collection
- Publisher: Angus and Robertson
- Publication date: 1918
- Publication place: Australia
- Media type: Print
- Pages: 172 pp

The Passionate Heart is a collection of poems by Australian poet Mary Gilmore, published by Angus and Robertson in 1918.

The collection contains 99 poems with the majority of them being published here for the first time.

== Contents ==
- "These Fellowing Men"
- "Memorial"
- "Gallipoli"
- "The Corn"
- "The Measure"
- "Serbian"
- "The Satin of the Bee"
- "The Australian"
- "The Passionate Heart"
- "The Wish"
- "Life's Treasurings"
- "The Owing"
- "Sister of Singers"
- "Eve-Song"
- "Australian"
- "The Gipsy Babe"
- "Nay, Let Me Not Go Yet"
- "Song of the Loving Woman"
- "Appassionata"
- "Bugles in the Valley"
- "Life-Song"
- "Contractual"
- "Lucy"
- "There is a Bird That Singeth..."
- "The Little Dancer in O'Brien's Lane"
- "Lost Arches of the Sun"
- "He Shall Forgive"
- "From after Years"
- "Three Songs"
- "The Linen for Pillow..."
- "Of Old Men"
- "I Have Been Glad"
- "To You"
- "Nostalgic"
- "Thackaring's Lament"
- "Memory"
- "To-Day"
- "My Town"
- "The Living Dust"
- "She Will Follow and Go"
- "The Woman"
- "Closed is the Door"
- "The Years That the Locust"
- "Heritage"
- "God Loveth Strength"
- "The Sword"
- "To Sleep"
- "The Mourning Vine"
- "The Elder Ones"
- "The Ploughman of the Moon"
- "Life and Thought"
- "Eyes That See"
- "The Crater"
- "Of Women"
- "Her Song"
- "Eternal Claim"
- "Love the Swallow"
- "The Sins of the Fathers"
- "The Disinherited"
- "The Wife's Song"
- "Of Books"
- "The Man's Way"
- "All or Nothing"
- "The Song of Banna"
- "The Fairy Boat"
- "Flameword"
- "Community Road"
- "Old Botany Bay"
- "Two Songs of the Grass"
- "The Little Leaven"
- "Clo'es Props!"
- "Bottle-O!"
- "Evening : Bronte"
- "Forgiveness"
- "Song"
- "The World of Dreams"
- "The Lost Garden"
- "Fuegian"
- "Patagonian"
- "Moon-Dance"
- "When Thou Art Old"
- "Life at Autumn"
- "Jane - Who Is Not Doreen"
- "The Fence"
- "When Myall Creek Was New"
- "The Word of the Humble"
- "The Little Cloud"
- "At Bronte"
- "Springwood"
- "Inheritance"
- "Sails of Thought"
- "The Lesson"
- "By the Lintel"
- "Portland Bay"
- "Under the Seven Stars"
- "Sessional Grass"
- "Fish O! Fish O!"
- "Israfel the Angel"
- "The King"

== Critical reception ==
A reviewer for The Bulletin magazine stated the "Commonwealth has produced no other singer quite like her; and her new volume, 'The Passionate Heart,' will make an appeal to circles of readers far beyond the bounds of the literary coteries."

Reviewing the collection for The Lone Hand magazine Zora Cross called Gilmore "a prophet of that spiritual age which is coming to us, and her vision is wide and full." Cross concluded her review by noting: "Whoever you are, if you are an honest Australian, you will not take a breath of her poetry without feeling a little more pride than hitherto in your country because it has produced Mary Gilmore."

== See also ==
- 1918 in Australian literature
