= The Ancient (poem) =

Poem by Mary Gilmore

- by Mary Gilmore
- First published in: The Bulletin
- Country: Australia
- Language: English
- Publication date: 23 August 1917
- Lines: 28

"The Ancient" is a poem by Australian poet Mary Gilmore. It was originally published in The Bulletin on 23 August 1917, and later in a number of Australian poetry anthologies.

The poem is also known by the title "Old Botany Bay", as it was reprinted in the author's 1918 collection The Passionate Heart.

== Critical analysis ==
In his volume A History of Australian Literature, H. M. Green listed the poem as one of "a number of poems that paved the way for the modern revival of interest in...the convicts who...helped blaze the track for us".

== Further publications ==
- Freedom on the Wallaby : Poems of the Australian People edited by Marjorie Pizer, Pinchgut Press, 1953
- The Penguin Book of Australian Verse edited by John Thompson, Kenneth Slessor and R. G. Howarth, Penguin Books, 1958
- Favourite Australian Poems edited by Ian Mudie, Rigby, 1963
- From the Ballads to Brennan edited by T. Inglis Moore, Angus & Robertson, 1964
- Mary Gilmore : A Tribute edited by Barrie Ovenden, Dymphna Cusack, and T. Inglis Moore, Australasian Book Society, 1965
- Songs for All Seasons : 100 Poems for Young People edited by Rosemary Dobson, Angus and Robertson, 1967
- Silence Into Song : An Anthology of Australian Verse edited by Clifford O'Brien, Rigby, 1968
- Australian Kaleidoscope edited by Barbara Ker Wilson, Collins, 1968
- The Penguin Book of Australian Verse edited by Harry Heseltine, Penguin Books, 1972
- Australia Fair : Poems and Paintings edited by Douglas Stewart, Ure Smith, 1974
- Cross-Country : A Book of Australian Verse edited by John Barnes and Brian MacFarlane, Heinemann, 1984
- The Illustrated Treasury of Australian Verse edited by Beatrice Davis, Nelson, 1984
- My Country : Australian Poetry and Short Stories, Two Hundred Years edited by Leonie Kramer, Lansdowne, 1985
- The Oxford Anthology of Australian Literature edited by Leonie Kramer and Adrian Mitchell, Oxford University Press, 1985
- Anthology of Australian Religious Poetry edited by Les Murray, Collins Dove, 1986
- The Penguin Book of Australian Women Poets edited by Susan Hampton and Kate Llewellyn, Penguin, 1986
- The Arnold Anthology of Post-Colonial Literatures in English edited by John Thieme, Arnold, 1996
- The Turning Wave : Poems and Songs of Irish Australia edited by Colleen Burke and Vincent Woods, Kardoorair Press, 2001
- Hell and After : Four Early English-language Poets of Australia edited by Les Murray, Carcanet, 2005
- Harbour City Poems : Sydney in Verse, 1788-2008 edited by Martin Langford, Puncher and Wattmann, 2009
- Macquarie PEN Anthology of Australian Literature edited by Nicholas Jose, Kerryn Goldsworthy, Anita Heiss, David McCooey, Peter Minter, Nicole Moore, and Elizabeth Webby, Allen and Unwin, 2009
- Antipodes : Poetic Responses edited by Margaret Bradstock, Phoenix Education, 2011

The poem was also translated into Esperanto.

== See also ==
- 1917 in poetry
- 1917 in literature
- 1917 in Australian literature
- Australian literature
