= 1925 in Australian literature =

This article presents a list of the historical events and publications of Australian literature during 1925.

== Books ==
- Martin Boyd (as Martin Mills) - Love Gods
- Dale Collins - The Haven
- Erle Cox - Out of the Silence
- Zora Cross — The Lute-Girl of Rainyvale : A Story of Love, Mystery, and Adventure in North Queensland
- Carlton Dawe
  - Love, the Conqueror
  - The Way of a Maid
- W. M. Fleming — Where Eagles Build
- Nat Gould — Riding to Orders
- Jack McLaren — Spear-Eye
- Henry Handel Richardson — The Way Home
- M. L. Skinner — Black Swans : rara avis in terris nigroque simillima cygno
- E. V. Timms — The Hills of Hate
- Ethel Turner — The Ungardeners
- E. L. Grant Watson — Daimon
- Arthur Wright — The Boy from Bullarah

== Poetry ==
- Mary Gilmore
  - "The Saturday Tub"
  - "The Square Peg and the Round"
  - The Tilted Cart : A Book of Recitations
- Henry Lawson
  - Poetical Works of Henry Lawson
  - Popular Verses
- Dorothea Mackellar — "Looking Forward"
- Furnley Maurice — Bleat Upon Bleat: A Book of Verses
- John Shaw Neilson
  - "The Lad Who Started Out"
  - "The Moon Was Seven Days Down"

== Children's and Young Adult fiction ==
- Mary Grant Bruce — The Houses of the Eagle
- May Gibbs — The Further Adventures of Bib and Bub

== Births ==
A list, ordered by date of birth (and, if the date is either unspecified or repeated, ordered alphabetically by surname) of births in 1925 of Australian literary figures, authors of written works or literature-related individuals follows, including year of death.

- 6 January — Rosemary Wighton, literary editor, author and advisor to the South Australian government on women's affairs (died 1994)
- 3 February — Keith Dunstan, journalist and author (died 2013)
- 8 February — Francis Webb, poet (died 1973)
- 10 February — John Rowland, public servant, diplomat and poet (died 1996)
- 28 March — Richard Beynon, playwright, actor and television producer (died 1999)
- 8 July — Vincent Buckley, poet and critic (died 1988)
- 25 August — Thea Astley, novelist (died 2004)
- 7 September — Laurence Collinson, British and Australian playwright, actor, poet, journalist, and secondary school teacher (died 1986)

== Deaths ==
A list, ordered by date of death (and, if the date is either unspecified or repeated, ordered alphabetically by surname) of deaths in 1925 of Australian literary figures, authors of written works or literature-related individuals follows, including year of birth.

- 22 March — Ernest O'Ferrall, poet (born 1881)
- 27 June — Simpson Newland, author and politician (born 1835 in England)

== See also ==
- 1925 in Australia
- 1925 in literature
- 1925 in poetry
- List of years in Australian literature
- List of years in literature
