= Pattie Fotheringhame =

Australian Editor and Journalist

- Born: Martha Lewis; 10 January 1853; Escrick, Yorkshire, England
- Died: 19 July 1955 (aged 102); Sydney, New South Wales, Australia
- Occupations: Editor and journalist
- Writing career
- Language: English
- Years active: 1898-1926

Pattie Fotheringhame (née Lewis, 10 January 1853 – 19 July 1955), commonly referred to as Mrs J. Fotheringhame, was a journalist in Sydney, Australia, who wrote for The Bulletin as "Mab". She has been described as Sydney's first woman journalist.

== History ==
Fotheringhame was a daughter of James Lewis ( – ) and Mary Ann Blanshard (c. 1819 – 23 August 1894) of Escrick, near York, England.

She began her writing career with children's stories for the Sydney Mail, and was invited to join the staff of that paper, but accepted a counter-offer by her brother-in-law William Henry Traill to join the Sydney Bulletin, of which he was editor and part-owner. Her first assignment, as an inexperienced 17 year old, was as founding editor of the "Women's Letter" society column, under the byline "Mab" in 1881, in competition with Mrs. Gullett's page in The Daily Telegraph.

Working at the Bulletin brought her into contact with many of Australia's leading writers and artists: Henry Lawson, Harold "The Pilgrim" Grey, Victor Daley and George Augustus Sala.

She left journalism after marrying James Fotheringhame, introducing as her replacement the vivacious Ina Wildman who, writing as "Sappho Smith", had an illustrious career before dying of nephritis.

Around 1891 she purchased the children's monthly magazine Young Australia from Louisa Lawson (mother of Henry Lawson), and ran it for 20 years with Josephine Fotheringhame, her sister-in-law, as editor. Farmers' and Settlers' Publishing Co., Ltd, purchased the title in 1910.

Around 1900 she purchased another monthly publication of more universal appeal, Splashes, which she edited, and by 1902 was being praised for its content and production values. She sold the title to Hollander and Govett after 13 years, but stayed on as editor. Mary Grant Bruce contributed Melbourne social news. The paper, which at some stage began fortnightly publication, closed in 1917 due to wartime shortages.

In March 1918 she began working for a new magazine, Ladies' Sphere.

In 1925 the Society of Women Writers was formed and Florence Baverstock was the inaugural President. Her four vice-presidents who created the society were Fotheringhame, Mary Gilmore, Isobel Gullett and Mary Liddell and the aim was to encourage other women writers.

== Other interests ==
Fotheringhame, an amateur photographer, was given equipment for photo-engraving by her brother-in-law Traill, who brought it back from America. She was successful in creating high quality zinc printing blocks from photographic negatives, so has been recognised as Australia's pioneer of the process.

== Family ==
Pattie Lewis married Commander James Fotheringhame, R.N.R. (1856 – 3 April 1935) on 8 September 1886. He was eldest son of Ralph Fotheringhame, of Lynnfield House, Kirkwall, Orkney. Their children included:

- Ralph Gilderoy Hepburn Fotheringhame (11 October 1890 – 25 May 1960) married Marcia Broadhurst on 28 February 1915
- Mab Traill Fotheringhame (15 August 1887 – 1 May 1961) married Reg M. Harrison c. 1912.

They had a home "Cliffside", at Watsons Bay, Sydney and later at "Mohaka", 68 Louisa Road, Long Nose Point, Sydney.

Her sisters included Susanna Ascot Lewis (died 18 June 1920); Jessie Lewis (c. 1843–1867); and Agnes Lewis (c. 1855 – 17 May 1930), these last two being married to William Henry Traill. John Joseph Lewis, possibly (1860 – 22 October 1946) was a brother.

Her sister-in-law, Josephine Fotheringham (c. 1854 – 13 September 1945), who was born in Orkney, wrote articles for Chambers' Journal.
