= Samuel Prior =

Australian journalist (1869–1933)

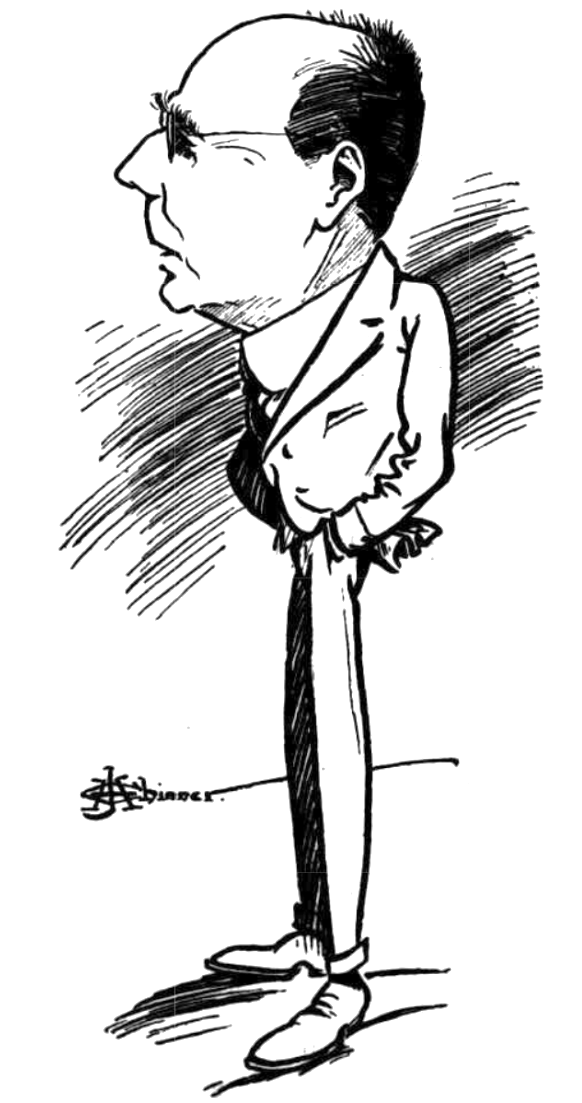
Prior, caricature by John Henry Chinner

Samuel Henry Prior (10 January 1869 – 6 June 1933), was an Australian journalist, manager and editor of The Bulletin.

Born in Brighton, South Australia, Prior was educated at Glenelg Grammar School and the Bendigo School of Mines and Industries. He started his career as a teacher, before becoming a mining reporter at the Bendigo Independent. In 1887, he was assigned to Broken Hill, New South Wales, to report on the silver mine. Prior briefly edited the Broken Hill Times and its successor, the Broken Hill Argus. For fourteen years from around 1889 he edited The Barrier Miner. During this time he championed trade unionism, promoted Australian nationalism and supported the Federation of Australia.

Prior had ambitions as a financial journalist and sent pieces to Sydney's The Bulletin. Jules François Archibald was so impressed that he invited Prior to join the staff. Prior accepted and took over from James Edmond as financial editor in 1903. In 1912 Prior became associate editor; in 1914 when Archibald sold his Bulletin interests to Prior, he became a major shareholder. In 1915 Prior became senior editor. In this role, he increased importance of the "Wild Cat" column, a financial and investment news and insights column focused on mining companies, which eventually (by 1923) grew into Wild Cat Monthly. Prior was promoted to associate editor in 1912. In 1914, Archibald sold his shares in The Bulletin to Prior, making Prior the majority shareholder. In 1915, he became the senior editor, in which position he built The Bulletin's reputation for literature and for financial journalism. In 1927, he was sold the remaining shares in The Bulletin and thus became not only its editor but its sole owner and manager. In 1928, he inaugurated the first Bulletin Novel Competition, offering aspiring writers prize money and the publishing of their work in The Bulletin.

Prior remained editor until 1933, when he died from heart disease, in Mosman, New South Wales. In 1935, his son established the S. H. Prior Memorial Prize for a work of Australian literature. Prior's family retained control of the magazine until it was bought by Consolidated Press Ltd in 1960.

== See also ==
- S. H. Prior Memorial Prize
