= Jeannie Lockett =

Australian writer

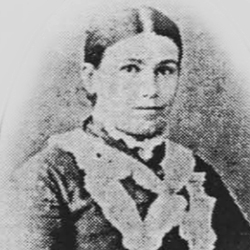
- Lockett c.1880
- Born: Jane Beattie; 27 August 1847; Bathurst, New South Wales, Australia
- Died: 14 November 1890 (aged 43); Darlinghurst, New South Wales, Australia
- Occupations: Social and political writer; school teacher
- Writing career
- Pen name: Jennie Lockett; Jeannie Leckett; Beattie
- Period: 1883–1892
- Subjects: divorce; female labour
- Notable work: "Divorce Considered from a Woman's Point of View"

Jane Lockett (27 August 1847 – 14 November 1890), better known as Jeannie Lockett, was an Australian feminist and schoolteacher. Her articles on women's social and political issues, including divorce, were published in England in the 1880s. She also wrote short stories and non-fiction for the Australian press, sometimes as Jennie Lockett or Jeannie Leckett or Beattie. Her novel, Judith Grant, was published posthumously.

== Life ==
Born Jane Beattie on 27 August 1847 in Bathurst, New South Wales, she was one of 15 children of writer Mary Anne (died 1906) and Hugh Beattie (died 1890). The family later settled at Wagga Wagga where Hugh established the Brooklyn vineyard. She married Thomas Lockett in Wagga on 27 May 1868. He was a blacksmith who had grown up on the goldfields at Lambing Flat (now Young).

Lockett left her husband in Wagga Wagga and moved to Sydney with her three young children, some time after their maid, Anne Blake, was sentenced to one year in Goulburn gaol for attempted suicide. According to historian Caroline Hardy, Blake, who was pregnant at the time, may have been seduced by Thomas. Lockett did not, however, divorce him. Marriage and divorce were common themes in her writing.

After her marriage broke down, Lockett worked as a student teacher from 1877 and then assistant schoolteacher at Hamilton Public School in 1880. In 1884 at Camperdown Public School she received a promotion. In 1888 she had been transferred to Plunkett Street Public School as mistress overseeing the female students. She also tutored students sitting for matriculation examinations for university entrance.

Alongside her teaching, Lockett sent articles on the Australian social and political scene which were published in The Westminster Review, The Nineteenth Century (TNC) and St James's Gazette. In 1885 her article on "Female Labour in Australia" was published in TNC in the hope of attracting women migrate to Australia to work as domestic servants. It was republished in The Bathurst Free Press and Mining Journal, described as a "well-written paper" but a review in the Australian Town and Country Journal felt it would do little to lessen the servant shortage.

Lockett's only novel, Judith Grant, was published posthumously by Hutchinson & Co in London. The literary critic for The Age wrote that the book "shows power which, with a little experience, might have placed her in a high position amongst English authors" and that "the gradual development of Judith's character and her change from Calvinism to a species of Pantheism are well drawn; but the hero is at best a poor creature". Judith Grant was republished by the British Library in 2011 as one of the Historical Print Editions.

In the Australian Woman's Mirror in 1926, "Pacla" wrote that Lockett had influenced Sir Alfred Stephen's writing (he had drafted the NSW Divorce Amendment and Extension Act), following publication of her article on the subject in The Nineteenth Century, a London literary journal. Pacla had heard Stephen say that "she had put the matter so much better than he had been able to do that he had torn up three of his own articles just ready to post to England". The series, "Divorce Considered from a Woman's Point of View", was republished in Wagga Wagga Express, which acknowledged The Westminster Review as the original publisher.

== Death and personal ==
Lockett died aged 43 on 14 November 1890 at St Vincent's Hospital, Darlinghurst and she was buried at Waverley Cemetery. Her niece, the poet, Mary Gilmore, wrote a detailed article about the Beattie family and its connection to Wagga Wagga. Gilmore also believed that it was through Lockett's activism that public school teachers were permitted to publish their writing.

== Selected works ==
=== Non-fiction ===
- "Dietary for Families" (1883 series)
- "Female Labour in Australia" (1885)
- "Divorce Considered from a Woman's Point of View" (1890 series)
- "Viticulture in Australia: Its Present State and Future Prospects"

=== Short stories ===
- "Miss Nagg's Little Affaire de Coeur" (1883 two-part story)
- "Jo's Ideal" (1884 two-part story)
- "Brother Jack and the Other Jack' (1884)
- "A Stony Creek Idyll" (1885 two-part story)
- "The Millwood Mystery" (1886–87 serial)
- "Kitty Cartwright" (1887)
- "Awfully Sudden Death" (1887 serial)
- "The Garston House Tragedy" (1888–89 serial)
- "The Case of Dr. Hilston" (1890 serial)

=== Novel ===
- Judith Grant: A Novel, Hutchinson (1892, 1893); British Library (2011)
- The Millwood Mystery, Corella Press (2019)
