= Nationality (poem) =

Poem by Mary Gilmore

- by Mary Gilmore
- First published in: The Australian Poetry 1942 edited by Robert D. Fitzgerald
- Country: Australia
- Language: English
- Publication date: 1942

"Nationality" is a poem by Australian poet Mary Gilmore. It was first published in Australian Poetry 1942, edited by Robert D. Fitzgerald in 1942, and later in the poet's collection Selected Verse, and other Australian poetry anthologies.

== Outline ==
The poem examines the conflicting emotions raised by war: the love of one's own people, and the desire for an international sense of brotherhood.

== Analysis ==
The Oxford Companion to Australian Literature states that in this poem Mary Gilmore "while conceding the need for internationalism, acknowledges the pre-eminent claims of race and blood".

In her collection of critical essays on Australian literature, Australian Classics: 50 great writers and their celebrated works, Jane Gleeson-White found the poem is "a concentration of intense and conflicting emotion in two stanzas." She concluded that the poem "has the force of truth."

Writing about the poem in 60 Classic Australian Poems editor Geoff Page called it "political poetry at its best." He went on to conclude that even "if the concept of 'nationalism' were to disappear from the human vocabulary, we'd still need Gilmore's poem to remind us of what it had been."

== Further publications ==
- Selected Verse by Mary Gilmore, 1948
- The Oxford Book of Australasian Verse edited by Walter Murdoch, Oxford University Press, 1950
- An Anthology of Australian Verse edited by George Mackaness, Angus & Robertson, 1952
- Fourteen Men by Mary Gilmore, 1964
- A Book of Australian Verse edited by Judith Wright, Oxford University Press, 1956
- New Land, New Language : An Anthology of Australian Verse edited by Judith Wright, Oxford University Press, 1957
- The Penguin Book of Australian Verse edited by John Thompson, Kenneth Slessor and R. G. Howarth, Penguin Books, 1958
- From the Ballads to Brennan edited by T. Inglis Moore, Angus & Robertson, 1964
- Mary Gilmore : A Tribute edited by Barrie Ovenden, Dymphna Cusack, and T. Inglis Moore, 1965
- Australian Verse from 1805 : A Continuum edited by Geoffrey Dutton, 1976
- The White Chrysanthemum : Changing Images of Australian Motherhood edited by Nancy Keesing, 1977
- The Golden Apples of the Sun : Twentieth Century Australian Poetry edited by Chris Wallace-Crabbe, Melbourne University Press, 1980
- The Collins Book of Australian Poetry edited by Rodney Hall, Collins, 1981
- The Illustrated Treasury of Australian Verse edited by Beatrice Davis, Nelson, 1984
- Cross-Country : A Book of Australian Verse edited by John Barnes and Brian MacFarlane, Heinemann, 1984
- Anthology of Australian Religious Poetry edited by Les Murray, Collins Dove, 1986
- Peace and War : A Collection of Poems edited by Michael Harrison, 1989
- The Oxford Book of Australian Women's Verse edited by Susan Lever, 1995
- Family Ties : Australian Poems of the Family edited by Jennifer Strauss, Oxford University Press, 1998
- Australian Verse : An Oxford Anthology edited by John Leonard, Oxford University Press, 1998
- Two Centuries of Australian Poetry edited by Kathrine Bell, Gary Allen, 2007
- 60 Classic Australian Poems edited by Geoff Page, University of NSW Press, 2009
- The Puncher & Wattmann Anthology of Australian Poetry edited by John Leonard, Puncher & Wattmann, 2009
- Australian Poetry Since 1788 edited by Geoffrey Lehmann and Robert Gray, University of NSW Press, 2011

== See also ==
- 1942 in poetry
- 1942 in literature
- 1942 in Australian literature
- Australian literature
