= Florence Baverstock =

Australian journalist (1861 - 1937)

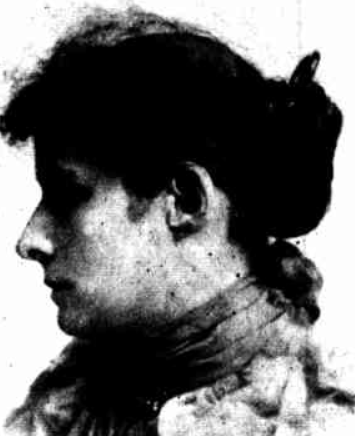
- in 1896
- Born: Louisa Florence Blair; 1860; Melbourne
- Died: 8 September 1937 (aged 75–76); Mosman
- Occupation: journalist
- Employer: Sydney Morning Herald
- Known for: leading journalist in a male dominated profession
- Spouse: Captain Archibald Boteler Baverstock
- Children: three
- Relatives: David Blair (father)

Florence Baverstock born Louisa Florence Blair (1860 – 8 September 1937) was an Australian journalist. She started writing by helping her father write books. She led the women's section of The Bulletin, The Daily Telegraph and the Sydney Morning Herald. She was chosen to be the inaugural President of the Australian Society of Women Writers.

== Life ==
Baverstock was born in 1860 in Melbourne. She had a sister named Lillian. Their parents were both immigrants. Her mother Annie (born Macpherson) was the sister of a politician. Her father David Blair was a journalist, writer and politician in Melbourne. Her father decided to write The History of Australasia and the Cyclopaedia Australasia. While she was in her teens she was helping her father in the construction of these books. They were published in 1878 and 1881. Her father further assisted her career when he became the editor of the newspaper The Age. She submitted articles to that paper.

She was involved with a periodical that was launched called "The Bohemian" in the 1880s. Its contributors were Florence and her sister Lillian and a group of moonlighting writers from The Argus. The editor forbade his writers from working elsewhere and paid them extra for their loyalty. Florence and Lillian became contributors but not employees of the Argus.

In 1895 veteran journalist Mary Hannay Foott interviewed Florence about her time on "The Bohemian" and about her and her sisters visit to Samoa. Florence had met Robert Louis Stevenson and his family who lived there. She championed him and she noted that he was well regarded by the Samoans who were much afraid of becoming a German colony. She and Lillian used the nom de plume of "Victorian Girl" jointly.

In 1896 she was employed by The Bulletin to lead their women's section. She was employed by the periodical, as their lead writer "Sappho Smith" (Ina Wildman) was ill and she died that year. She used the name "Cleo" when writing. A commentator who welcomed her appointment, noted that she was the only woman who had written a leader for The Argus. Her career was interrupted by marriage and three children, but she was employed again on the women's section in 1907. This time it was in Sydney for the Daily Telegraph.

In 1918 she retired from the Sydney Morning Herald in 1918 after leading its woman section from 1914. Her place was taken by Jean Williamson who was to also be a leader in writing for Australian women in newspapers.

In 1925 the Society of Women Writers was formed and Baverstock was the inaugural President. Her four vice-presidents were Pattie Fotheringhame, Mary Gilmore, Isobel Gullett and Mary Liddell and the aim was to encourage other women writers.

Baverstock died in the Sydney suburb of Mosman on 8 September 1937. She was buried in a family plot. The Melbourne Press Club includes her in their Hall of Fame.
