= Katherine L. Craig =

Colorado Superintendent of Public Instruction

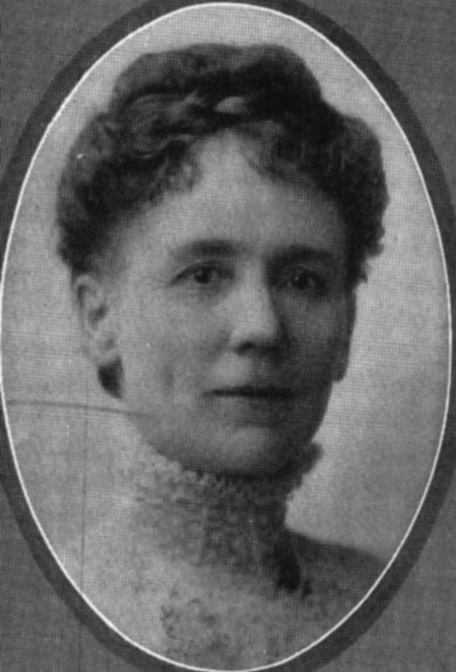

Katherine L. Craig (April 1876 - 1934) was an educator and textbook writer who served several terms as Colorado's Superintendent of Public Instruction. She succeeded Democrat Helen Loring Grenfell, who she defeated in a statewide election for the office. Craig won re-election two years later before losing to Katherine Cook. She ran again in 1914, losing to Mary C. C. Bradford who she eventually defeated in 1920, lost to again in 1922 and 1924, before winning in the election of 1926. She won in 1928 against Inez Johnson Lewis, who she lost to in 1930 and 1932. She wrote the novel, Judge Greyburn and Kathlene Lee.

She was born in Jefferson County, Colorado to Hugh and Hester Craig. She taught literature in Colorado and Utah. She served as Jefferson County Public School Superintendent.

== Katherine Craig Park ==
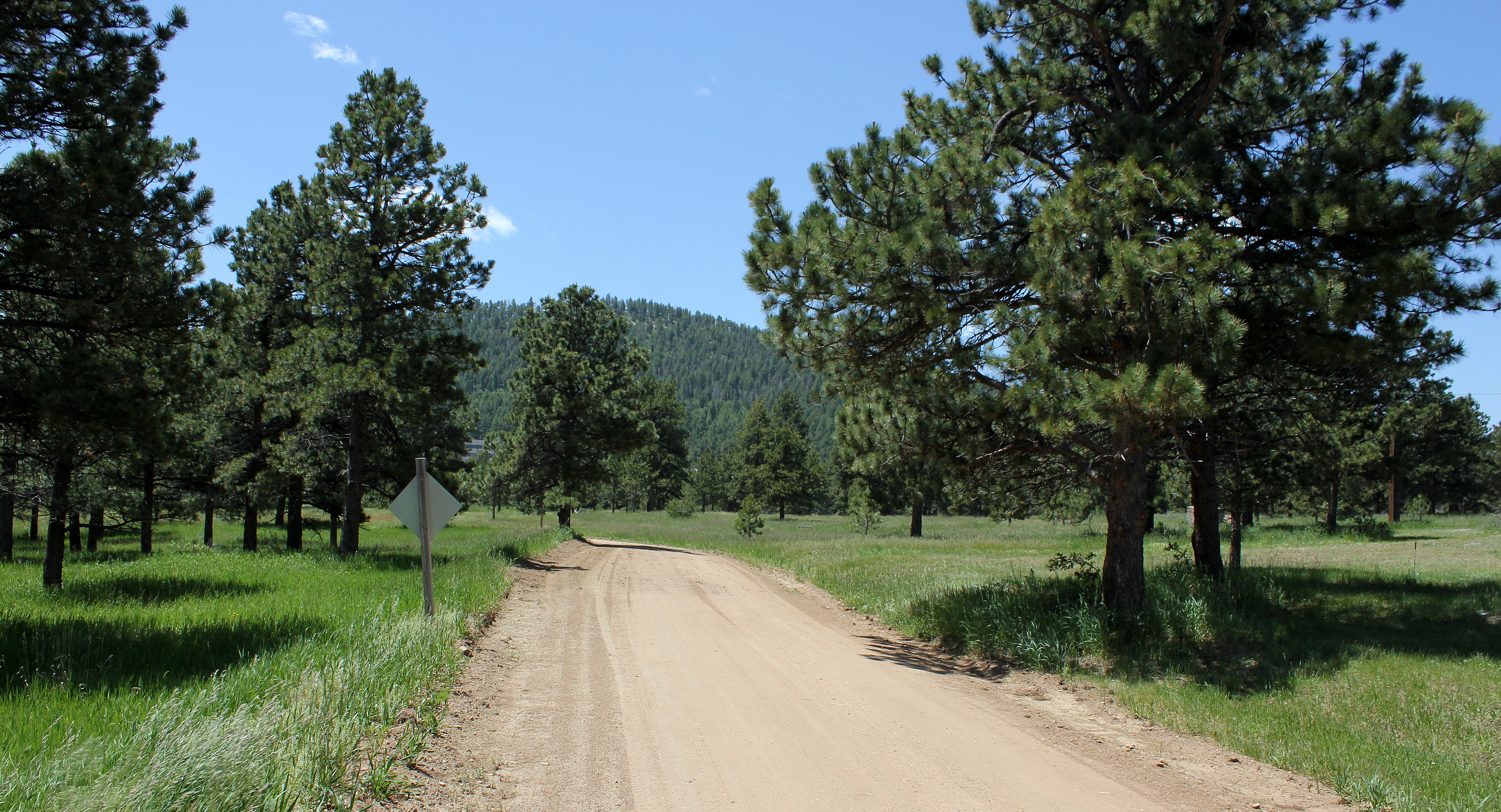
Katherine Craig Park

She never married and donated her land that is now Katherine Craig Park. It is listed on the National Register of Historic Places.

== Writings ==
- Craig's Brief History of Colorado (1923)
- Judge Greyburn and Kathlene Lee, a novel

== See also ==
- National Register of Historic Places listings in Jefferson County, Colorado
