= Ellen Joy Todd =

Australian feminist journalist (1860–1948)

Ellen Joy Todd née Orr (16 May 1860 – 24 February 1948) was an Australian feminist, journalist and editor best known as a contributor to The Dawn and other feminist publications as well as being the founding editor of the Women's Budget, a women's magazine.

== Biography ==
Todd was born at the Woolwich Arsenal in Greenwich and was the daughter of a captain of the Royal Artillery, Andrew Orr and wife wife Lucy Erskine. Her father died when she was only 10 years old, in 1870, and her mother and siblings moved in with her grandfather, an Anglican clergyman, and where educated at home and learned to speak Italian.

On 14 June 1887 Todd married Robert Henry Todd, who went on to become a medical administrator, and after their wedding they sailed together to Sydney where he worked as a doctor. In Sydney Todd founded the Ladies' Club in 1889. Soon after, also in 1889, the pair moved to Maclean in the Northern Rivers region of New South Wales where she became secretary of the local St John Ambulance Association.

Todd and her husband would return to Sydney in 1892 where she began working as a journalist and made contributions to various publications including The Dawn, a feminist magazine, which was then led by Louisa Lawson with whom she became good friends. In the Dawn she wrote under the names EJ Todd or Mrs RH Todd and regularly shared poetry and short stories. Todd would also report back on talks she had either attended or given.

She then joined the staff of the Australian Town and Country Journal where she primarily wrote book, theatre and music reviews as well as social notes.

In 1906 she became the founding editor of a weekly magazine, the Women's Budget, which was published by Samuel Bennett's company, and it claimed to be "written by women for women". The magazine featured the expected content of a women's magazine, including cooking, dressmaking and fashion, but also included more general content. In 1917, while editor, Todd published "Rhymes at Random" as a charity fundraiser for the War Chest during World War I.

Todd remained in this role until 1923 and which point the circulation was estimated at 150,000 people each week and a later editor, from 1930 to 1936, was Constance Robertson. This magazine was a predecessor of The Australian Women's Weekly, which was launched in 1933, and became one of its main competitors.

During her career Todd became good friends with Alexina Maude Wildman.

Todd's husband, Robert, died in 1931 and, from 1933 until 1940, she contributed to the Empire Gazette which was edited by Adela Pankhurst. In 1938 she also published her memoirs "Looking Back" in which she shared anecdotes of her life in Sydney and her interactions with "society people" as well as artists and other people of note; she also spoke about her earlier life, travel to Australia and time in Mclean.

Todd died on 24 February 1948 in Double Bay.
