= Mary Gilmore =

Australian poet (1865–1962)

Dame Mary Gilmore DBE
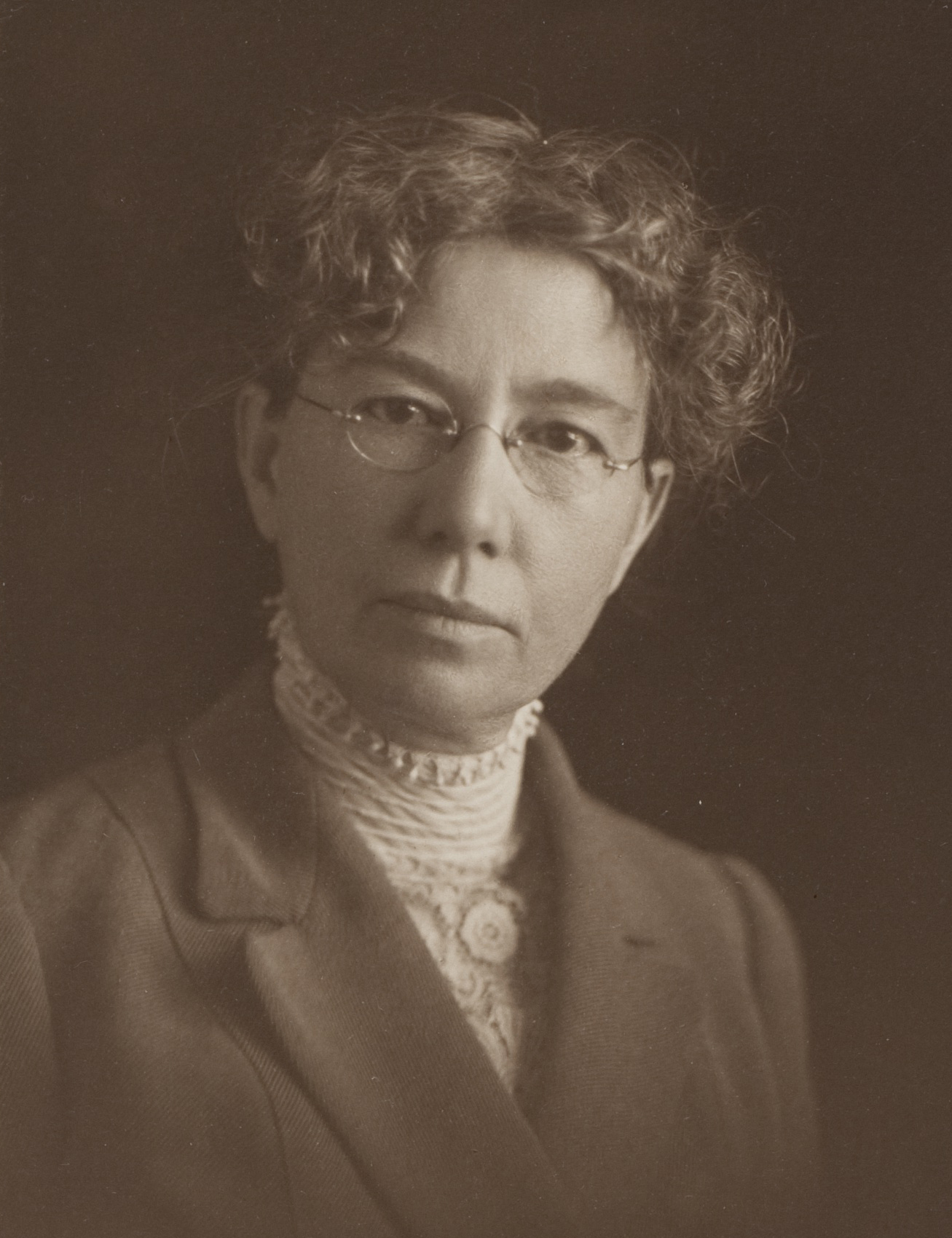
- Gilmore in 1916, by May Moore
- Born: Mary Jean Cameron; 16 August 1865 near Crookwell, New South Wales, Australia
- Died: 3 December 1962 (aged 97); Sydney, New South Wales, Australia
- Occupation: Writer
- Spouse: William Alexander Gilmore
- Children: 1

Dame Mary Jean Gilmore DBE (née Cameron; 16 August 1865 – 3 December 1962) was an Australian writer and journalist known for her prolific contributions to Australian literature and the broader national discourse. She wrote both prose and poetry.

Gilmore was born in rural New South Wales, and spent her childhood in and around the Riverina, living both in small bush settlements and in larger country towns like Wagga Wagga. Gilmore qualified as a schoolteacher at the age of 16, and after a period in the country was posted to Sydney. She involved herself with the burgeoning labour movement and the Bulletin School of radical nationalists, and she also became a devotee of the utopian socialist views of William Lane. In 1893, Gilmore and 200 others followed Lane to Paraguay, where they formed the New Australia Colony. She started a family there, but the colony did not live up to expectations and they returned to Australia in 1902.

Drawing on her connections in Sydney, Gilmore found work with The Australian Worker as the editor of its women's section, a position she held from 1908 to 1931. She also wrote for a variety of other publications, including The Bulletin and The Sydney Morning Herald, becoming known as a campaigner for the welfare of the disadvantaged. Gilmore's first volume of poetry was brought out in 1910; she published prolifically for the rest of her life, mainly poetry but also memoirs and collections of essays. She wrote on a variety of themes, although the public imagination was particularly captured by her evocative views of country life. Her best known work is "No Foe Shall Gather Our Harvest", which served as a morale booster during World War II.

Gilmore's greatest recognition came in later life. She was the doyenne of the Sydney literary world, and became something of a national icon, making frequent appearances in the new media of radio and television. Gilmore maintained her prodigious output into old age, publishing her last book of verse in 1954, aged 89. Two years earlier she had begun writing a new column for the Tribune (the official newspaper of the Communist Party), which she continued for almost a decade. Gilmore died at the age of 97 and was accorded a state funeral, a rare honour for a writer. She has featured on the reverse of the Australian ten-dollar note since 1993.

== Early life ==
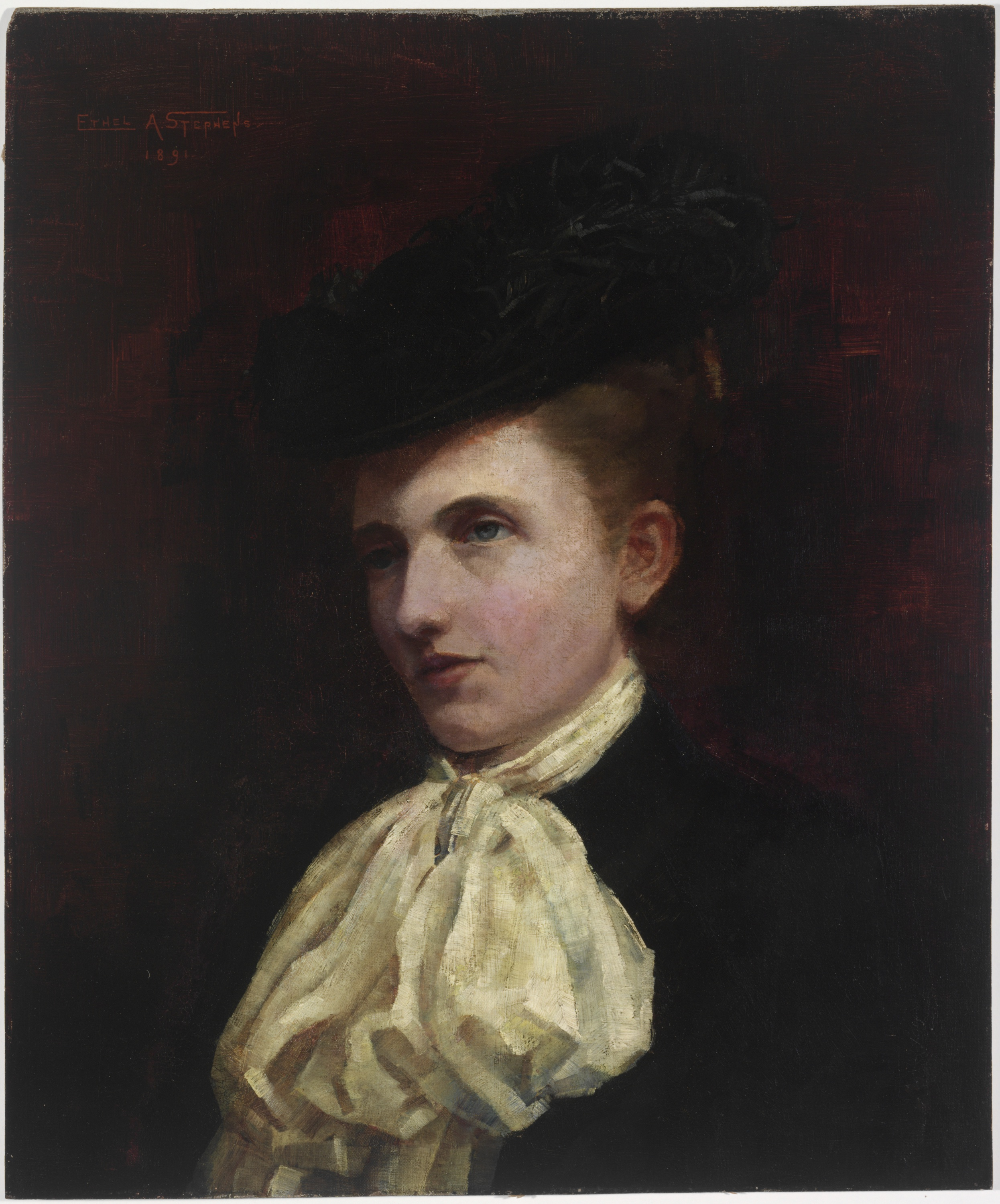
Dame Mary Gilmore, 1891

Mary Jean Cameron was born on 16 August 1865 at the small settlement of Cotta Walla (modern-day Roslyn), just outside Crookwell, New South Wales. When she was one year old her parents, Donald Cameron, a farmer from Scotland, and Mary Ann Beattie, decided to move to Wagga Wagga to join her maternal grandparents, the Beatties, who had moved there from Penrith, New South Wales in 1866.

Her father obtained a job as a station manager at a property at Cowabbie, 100 km north of Wagga. A year later, he left that job to become a carpenter, building homesteads on properties in Wagga, Coolamon, Junee, Temora and West Wyalong for the next 10 years. This itinerant existence allowed Mary only a spasmodic formal education; however, she did receive some on their frequent returns to Wagga, either staying with the Beatties or in rented houses.

Her father purchased land and built his own house at Brucedale on the Junee Road, where they had a permanent home. She was then to attend, albeit briefly, Colin Pentland's private Academy at North Wagga Wagga and, when the school closed, transferred to Wagga Wagga Public School for two and a half years. At 14, in preparation to become a teacher, she worked as an assistant at her uncle's school at Yerong Creek. Another uncle, Charles White (1845–1922), was a journalist and author of books on bushrangers, while an aunt, Jeannie Lockett (née Jane Beattie) was a teacher and writer.

After completing her teaching exams in 1882, she accepted a position as a teacher at Wagga Wagga Public School, where she worked until December 1885. After a short teaching spell at Illabo she took up a teaching position at Silverton near the mining town of Broken Hill. There Gilmore developed her socialist views and began writing poetry.

== Literary career ==
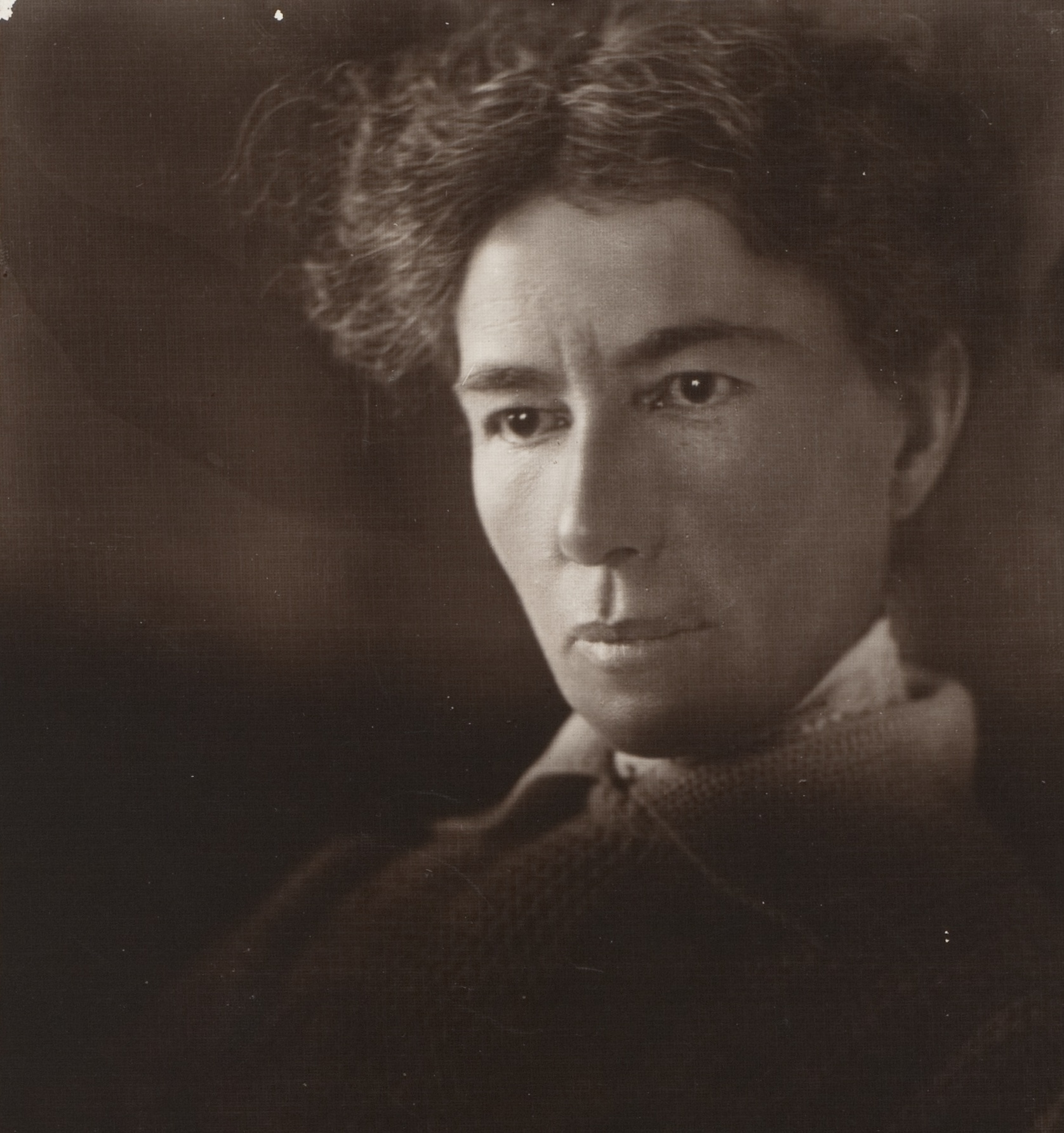
Mary Gilmore in 1912

In 1890, she moved to Sydney, where she became part of the Bulletin School, centered around the radical nationalist journal The Bulletin. Although the greatest influence on her work was Henry Lawson, it was Alfred "A. G." Stephens, literary editor of The Bulletin, who published her verse and established her reputation as a fiery radical poet, champion of the workers and the oppressed.

She had a relationship with Henry Lawson that probably began in 1890. She writes of an unofficial engagement and Lawson's wish to marry her, but it was broken by his frequent absences from Sydney. The story of the relationship is told in the play "All My Love", written by Anne Brooksbank.

She followed William Lane and other socialist idealists to Paraguay in 1896, where they had established a communal settlement called New Australia two years earlier. At Lane's breakaway settlement Cosme she married William Gilmore in 1897. By 1900 the socialist experiment had clearly failed. Will left to work as a shearer in Argentina and Mary and her two-year-old son Billy soon followed, living separately in Buenos Aires for about six months, and then the family moved to Patagonia until they saved enough for a return passage, via England, in 1902 to Australia, where they took up farming near Casterton, Victoria.

Gilmore's first volume of poetry was published in 1910, and for the ensuing half-century she was regarded as one of Australia's most popular and widely read poets. In 1908 she became women's editor of The Worker, the newspaper of then Australia's largest and most powerful trade union, the Australian Workers' Union (AWU). She was the union's first woman member. The Worker gave her a platform for her journalism, in which she campaigned for the preservation of the White Australia Policy, better working conditions for working women, for children's welfare and for a better deal for the Indigenous Australians. In 1925 the Society of Women Writers was formed and Florence Baverstock was the inaugural President. Her four vice-presidents who founded the society were Gilmore, Pattie Fotheringhame, Isobel Gullett and Mary Liddell and the aim was to encourage other women writers.

== Later life ==
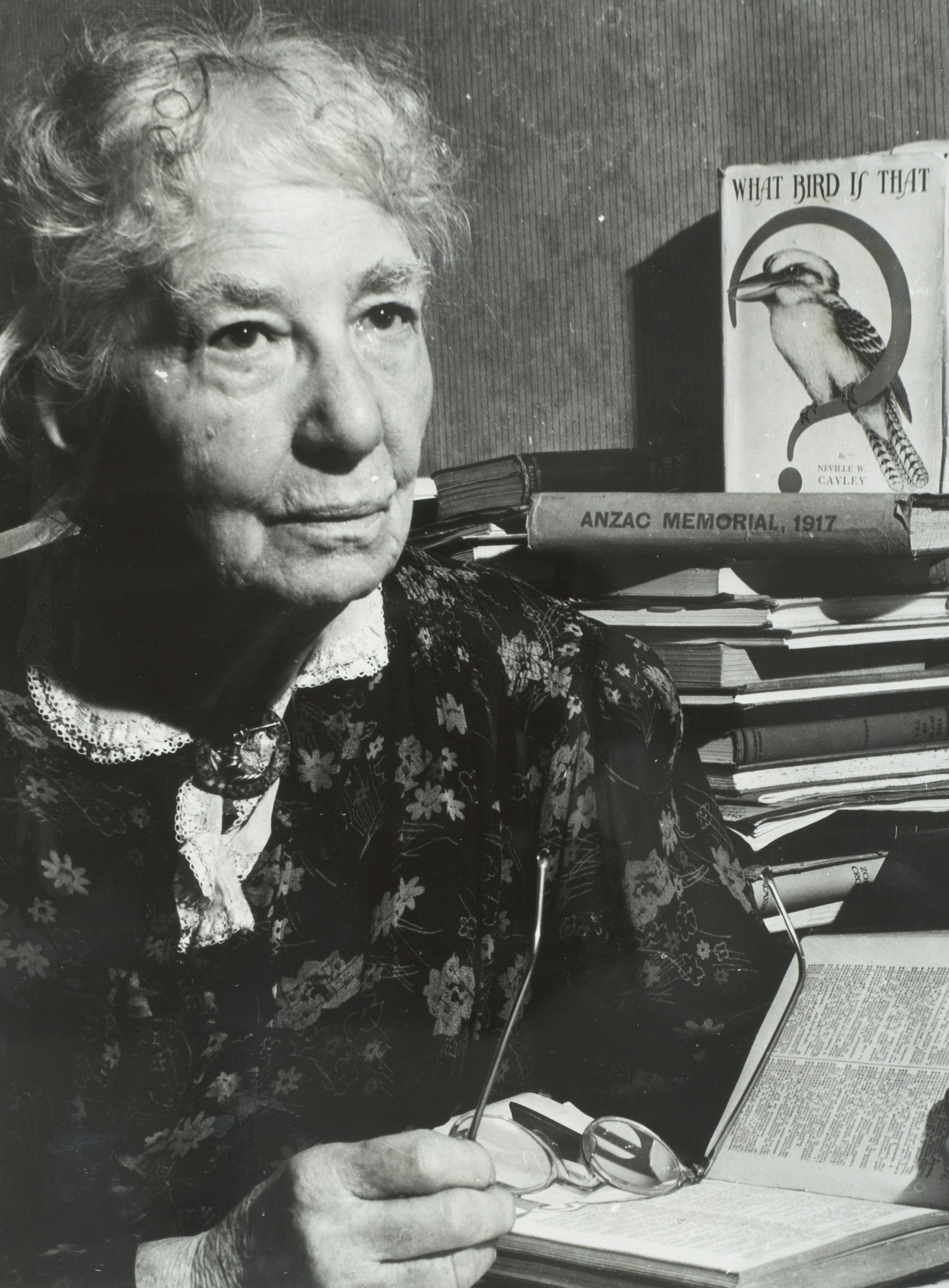
Gilmore in 1948

By 1931, Gilmore's views had become too radical for the AWU, but she soon found other outlets for her writing. She later wrote a regular column for the Communist Party's newspaper Tribune, although she was never a party member herself. In spite of her somewhat controversial politics, Gilmore accepted appointment as a Dame Commander of the Order of the British Empire in 1937, becoming Dame Mary Gilmore. She was the first person to be granted the award for services to literature. During World War II, she wrote stirring patriotic verse such as No Foe Shall Gather Our Harvest.

In her later years, Gilmore, separated from her husband, moved to Sydney, and enjoyed her growing status as a national literary icon. Before 1940, she published six volumes of verse and three editions of prose. After the war, Gilmore published volumes of memoirs and reminiscences of colonial Australia and the literary giants of 1890s Sydney, thus contributing much material to the mythologising of that period. Dame Mary Gilmore died in 1962, aged 97, and was accorded the first state funeral for a writer since the death of Henry Lawson in 1922.

== Recognition and legacy ==
Dobell's 1957 portrait of Dame Mary Gilmore was a finalist in that year's Archibald Prize, and can be seen in the Art Gallery of NSW.

In 1973 she was honoured on a postage stamp issued by Australia Post.

A park in West Pennant Hills, Sydney is named in her honour. The park hosts a large flag pole and Australian flag with the location historically being the location of a signal flag for communication between the early settlements of Parramatta and Windsor.

The Canberra suburb of Gilmore, the state highway Mary Gilmore Way (which runs east north east from Barmedman to Grenfell), a federal electorate, the Division of Gilmore and Gilmore Crescent in the Canberra suburb of Garran are named in her honour. Mary Gilmore Road is a major thoroughfare in the Wagga Wagga suburb of Brucedale.

Gilmore was inducted onto the Victorian Honour Roll of Women in 2001.

Gilmore's image appears on the second (1993–2017) and third series (2017–) Australian ten-dollar note, along with an illustration inspired by "No Foe Shall Gather Our Harvest" and, as part of the copy-protection microprint, the text of the poem itself.

She was the great-great aunt of politician and later prime minister Scott Morrison, who in 2012, on the 50th anniversary of her death, delivered a tribute to her in federal parliament.

In September 2019, Gilmore's poem, "No Foe Shall Gather Our Harvest" was read aloud by United States president Donald Trump during a state dinner for Australia in the presence of prime minister Morrison.

=== Mary Gilmore Award ===
The Mary Gilmore Award was established in 1956 by the Australian Council of Trade Unions (ACTU) as the ACTU Dame Mary Gilmore Award, and after several incarnations with prizes awarded in several different categories, has been awarded as a poetry prize since 1985, as of 2022 by the Association for the Study of Australian Literature.

== Bibliography ==
=== Poetry ===
- Two Songs (1905)
- Marri'd and Other Verses (1910)
- The Tale of Tiddley Winks (1916)
- Six Songs from the South (1916)
- The Passionate Heart (1918)
- The Tilted Cart : A Book of Recitations (1925)
- The Wild Swan : Poems (1930)
- The Rue Tree : Poems (1931)
- Under the Wilgas (1932)
- Battlefields (1939)
- Pro Patria and Other Poems (1944)
- Selected Verse (1948)
- Fourteen Men : Verses (1954)
- Men of Eureka and Other Australian Songs (1954)
- Verse for Children (1955)
- Poems (1957)
- Mary Gilmore edited by Robert D. Fitzgerald (1963)
- Poems to Read to Young Australians (1968)
- The Singing Tree : A Selection of Mary Gilmore's Poetry for Young Readers (1971)
- The Collected Verse of Mary Gilmore edited by Jennifer Strauss (2004–07)

=== Selected individual poems ===
Title	Year	First published	Reprinted/collected in
"The Ancient"	1917	The Bulletin, 23 August 1917, p3	The Passionate Heart, Angus and Robertson, 1918, pp. 124–125
"The Brucedale Scandal"	1924	The Bulletin, 18 December 1924, p38	The Tilted Cart : A Book of Recitations by Mary Gilmore, Workers Trade Union Print, 1925, pp. 72–74
"No Foe Shall Gather Our Harvest"	1940	The Australian Women's Weekly, 29 June 1940, p5	Fourteen Men by Mary Gilmore, Angus and Robertson, 1954, p. 26
"Nationality"	1942	Australian Poetry 1942, edited by Robert D. Fitzgerald	Selected Verse by Mary Gilmore, Angus and Robertson, 1948

=== Prose ===
- The Hound of the Road (1922)
- Old Days : Old Ways : A Book of Recollections (1934)
- More Recollections (1935)
- Letters of Mary Gilmore edited by W. H. Wilde and T. Inglis Moore (1980)

== Archives At ==
- Dame Mary Gilmore papers, [ca. 1858]-1962, State Library of New South Wales, MLMSS 123
- Dame Mary Gilmore papers, 1911-1954, State Library of New South Wales, A 3252- A 3293/8, SAFE/A 3265 (Safe 3/96), SAFE/A 3268 (Safe 3/96)
- Mary Gilmore papers, 1943-1953, State Library of New South Wales, MLMSS 1287
- Mary Gilmore letters, 1945-1952, State Library of New South Wales, MLMSS 758
- Mary Gilmore, poems, 1913, no date, State Library of New South Wales, MLMSS 4937/Box 6/Item 5(c)
- Dame Mary Gilmore pictorial and realia collection, ca. 1860-1962, State Library of New South Wales, forms part of Gilmore papers at A3252-A3293 and MLMSS 123 nV2qRXQn
- Mary Gilmore Award records, 1958-1970, State Library of New South Wales, MLMSS 4778
