= Fourteen Men =

Poetry book by Mary Gilmore

Fourteen Men : Verses
- First edition
- Author: Mary Gilmore
- Language: English
- Genre: poetry
- Publisher: Angus and Robertson
- Publication date: 1954
- Media type: Print
- Pages: 94 pp
- Preceded by: Selected Verse
- Followed by: Men of Eureka and Other Australian Songs

Fourteen Men : Verses (1954) is a collection of poetry by Australian poet Mary Gilmore. It won the ALS Gold Medal in 1954.

The collection consists of 82 poems which were all published for the first time in this volume.

The title poem makes reference to the massacre of Chinese during the Lambing Flat riots of 1860–61.

== Contents ==
- "The Sword"
- "Fourteen Men"
- "Los Encerrados"
- "The Scream"
- "Nationality"
- "These?"
- "On the Wire"
- "The Source"
- "Nature"
- "The Barwon Ford"
- "Old Forthright"
- "The Atomic Bomb"
- "The Lesser Grail"
- "The Gilmore Chief"
- "The Dust-Bowl"
- "The Pear Tree"
- "The Coming"
- "All Souls"
- "I Am the Idle"
- "The Forest Prayed"
- "The Flower-Stall"
- "The Singing Child"
- "Old Jane"
- "The Whistling Man"
- "The Eye of the Wift"
- "No Foe Shall Gather Our Harvest"
- "Song of the Breed"
- "Our Elder Statesman"
- "The Debt"
- "Singapore"
- "Ten Dead Leaves"
- "Inheritance"
- "The Recessive"
- "1940"
- "Casualty Lists"
- "The Little Feet"
- "Out on the Farm"
- "Tears"
- "Grief"
- "They Called Her Sunshine"
- "A Memory"
- "The Mother-Heart"
- "Life"
- "From the Dust"
- "Stoic"
- "The Flesh"
- "The Loom"
- "In the Garden"
- "Radar"
- "On One-Tree Hill"
- "Not Mine the Sea!"
- "Jindra "
- "The Whinnying Mare of Bronte"
- "Job xxviii, 7, 8"
- "Love's Wintered Hearth"
- "Word-Held"
- "In Testament"
- "Angry Penguins"
- "Some Critics"
- "Some Modernists"
- "Verdict"
- "Today"
- "The Thumb"
- "Values"
- "Words"
- "Freedom"
- "The Call"
- "Autumn Leaves"
- "The Last Word"
- "The Road"
- "Fragments"
- "Ichabod"
- "Singing the Knees (the Emu Totem)"
- "Ngcobbera"
- "An Aboriginal Simile"
- "Aboriginal : The Great Snake"
- "An Aboriginal Belief"
- "In the Beginning"
- "In the Blossom Time"
- "To Helen Cameron Roberts"
- "Evil Destroys Itself"
- "Envoii"

== Reviews ==
"J. E.", a reviewer in The Cairns Post was quite enthusiastic about the collection. "Despite her 89 years, Dame Mary shows a remarkable talent for continuing to write poems of such depth and perspective that they could easily have been written by a person 60 years her junior. She writes not of the past (which she could well do remembering her colourful career) but of modern aspects of this disenchanted age — aeroplanes radar and atom bombs." The reviewer then went on to compare Gilmore with Byron, Shelley and Browning.

A. D. Hope was rather more analytical in his review in The Sydney Morning Herald: "Apart from the patriotic and the war poems, Fourteen Men seems to me in some ways Mary Gilmore's best. There are better poems in the volume of selected verse published in 1948, but in this volume there is concentration, a distillation, and clarification of the essence, less of the trivial and occasional, and a plain note of vision which is, perhaps, the effect of the clairvoyance that comes from looking back on things long done with but not abandoned, loved but no longer possessed. It is this sense of clairvoyance which is the strongest impression the book leaves, as her mind moves back in quest and excitement over the events and people of her youth, the sights and creatures of the country in New South Wales and the lives of the aborigines whom she knew as a child."

== Awards and nominations ==
- 1954 — winner ALS Gold Medal

== See also ==
- 1954 in Australian literature
