= Grenfell =

Grenfell may refer to:

== Buildings ==
- Grenfell Campus, Memorial University of Newfoundland, Canada
- Grenfell Centre, Adelaide, Australia, an office block
- Grenfell railway station, New South Wales, Australia
- Grenfell Tower, a derelict tower block in London, United Kingdom
  - Grenfell Tower fire, a fatal fire at the tower block in June 2017

== People ==
- Alice Grenfell (1842–1917), British suffragist and Egyptologist
- Bernard Pyne Grenfell (1869–1926), English Egyptologist
- Bryan Grenfell (b. 1954), British biologist
- Cecil Grenfell (1864–1924), soldier and British Liberal politician
- Charles Grenfell (1790–1867), British businessman and politician
- Charles Grenfell (1823–1861), British politician
- Clarine Coffin Grenfell (1910–2004), American poet
- David Grenfell (1881–1968), Welsh politician
- Diana Grenfell (1935-2021), British plantswoman
- Edward Grenfell, 1st Baron St Just (1870–1941), British politician and banker
- Ettie Grenfell, Baroness Desborough (1967–1952), British society hostess
- Eustace Grenfell (1890–1964), British pilot
- Frances Grenfell, later Campbell-Preston (1918–2022), British author and courtier
- Francis Grenfell, 1st Baron Grenfell (1841–1925), British soldier
- Francis Octavius Grenfell (1880–1915), English soldier and Victoria Cross winner
- George Grenfell (1849–1906), Cornish missionary and explorer
- George St. Leger Grenfell (1808–1868), British soldier of fortune
- Helen Loring Grenfell (1863–1935), American suffragist and state superintendent of schools
- Henry Grenfell (1824–1902), British banker and politician
- Hubert Grenfell (1845–1906), British naval officer
- Joanne Grenfell (b. 1972), British bishop
- John Pascoe Grenfell (1800–1869), British admiral in the Brazilian Navy
- Joyce Grenfell (1910–1979), English actress, comedian and singer–songwriter
- Julian Grenfell (1888–1915), British poet and son of Lord Desborough
- Julian Grenfell, 3rd Baron Grenfell (b. 1935), British politician
- Maria Grenfell (b. 1969), Australian musician and composer
- Pascoe Grenfell (1761–1838), British businessman and politician
- Pascoe Grenfell, 2nd Baron Grenfell (1905–1976), British politician
- Pascoe St Leger Grenfell (1798–1879), British businessman
- Peter Grenfell, 2nd Baron St Just (1922–1984), British politician
- Stephen Grenfell (d. 1989), British broadcaster
- Stephen Grenfell (b. 1966), English footballer
- Wilfred Grenfell (1865–1940), British medical missionary
- William Grenfell, 1st Baron Desborough (1855–1945), British athlete, sportsman and public servant

=== Given name ===
- Grenfell Jones (1934–2007), Welsh cartoonist
- Grenfell Price (1892–1977), Australian geographer
- Arthur Grenfell Wauchope (1874–1947), British army officer and colonial administrator

== Places ==
- Grenfell, New South Wales, Australia, a town
- Grenfell, Saskatchewan, Canada, a town
- Grenfell Street, Adelaide, Australia

== Other uses ==
- Grenfell (brand), a British luxury fashion house known for "Grenfell cloth", a cotton twill fabric
