= Mary Liddell =

(1877–1967) Irish born Australian journalist

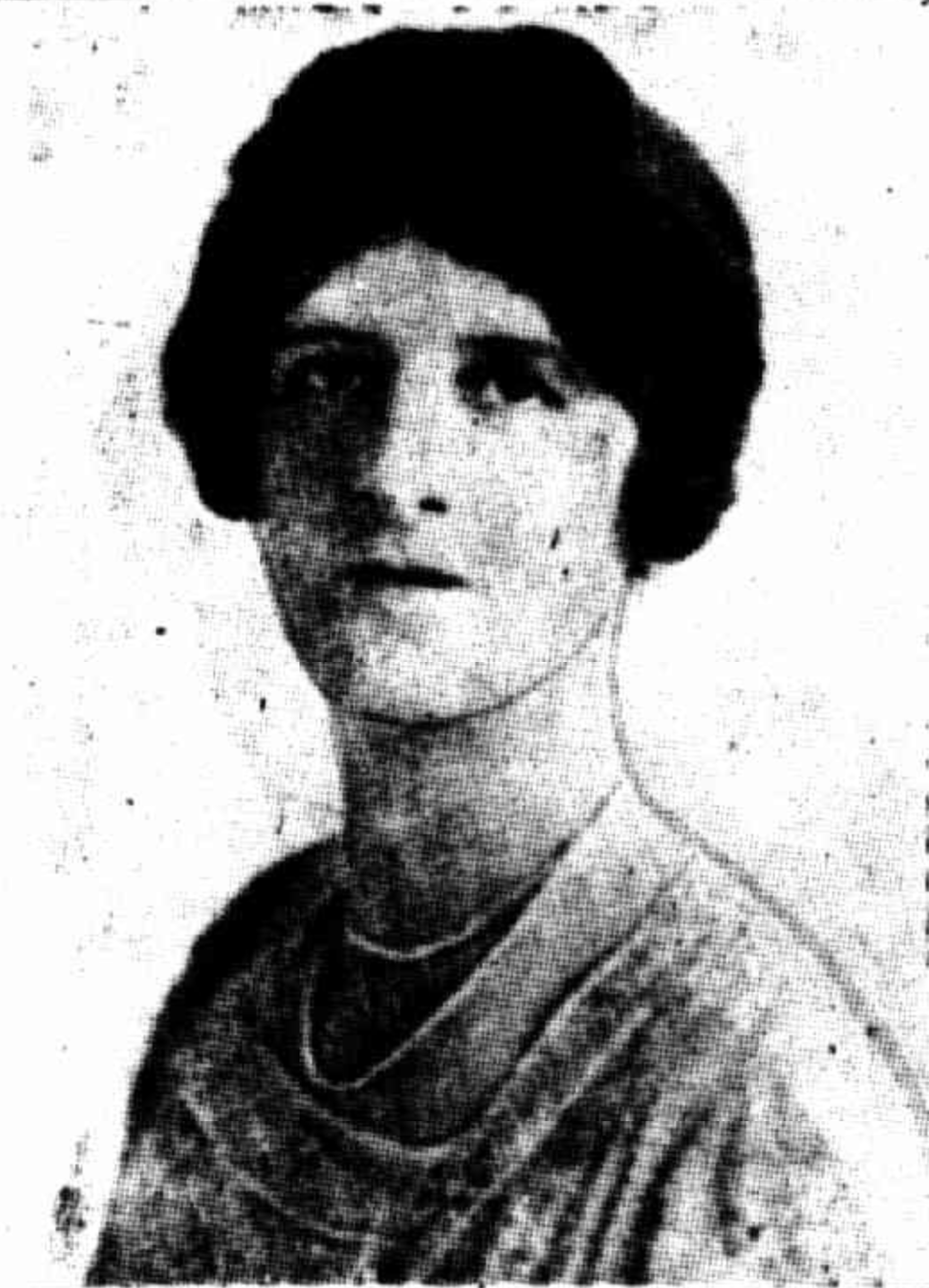
Mary Liddell in 1929

Mary Wherry Liddell (22 October 1877 – 3 October 1967) was an Australian journalist and feminist, born in Ireland.

== History ==
Liddell was born Mary Wherry Bullock, daughter of Mary Bullock, née Wherry, and her husband Thomas Bullock of Lisnaskea, County Fermanagh, Ireland. The novelist Shan Bullock was her elder brother. She married James Crothers Liddell ( – 13 April 1946) on 18 June 1902 and settled at Cookstown, County Tyrone; they had two sons, Edward (1904) and Leslie (1907), then emigrated to Australia, settling in Sydney. Her husband was a member of the Ulster Association of New South Wales 1915–1928 at least.

By 1915 Liddell was involved in patriotic work, raising funds for the Irish Ambulance, and Red Cross

She joined Sydney's Feminist Club, and was elected to the committee in February 1916. In 1920 she was joint secretary with H. Marston, and secretary a year later, and in 1923 when the Club gained its own rooms in the basement of the Culwulla Chambers. And when in 1929 the Feminist Club backed out of its agreement to join with the Women's League of N.S.W. and Women Voters' Association in forming the United Associations, Liddell was one of those, with Club president Mrs Kenneth Street (ie Jessie Street), who "jumped ship" to join the new organisation.

Liddell was presumably working as a journalist by March 1917, when she played Urania in an entertainment presented by women journalists at the Repertory Theatre, Sydney. She was working at the Evening News and Sunday News 1920–1929. She briefly worked for Melbourne Truth in 1932–1933.

In 1923 she was elected to the council of the N.S.W. Institute of Journalists, the first woman so appointed. She remained a member, serving in various roles, until 1956, when the Institute was wound up.

Liddell was, in 1925, an inaugural vice-president of the Society of Women Writers. Florence Baverstock was the inaugural President. The three other vice-presidents were Pattie Fotheringhame, Mary Gilmore and Isobel Gullett and the society's aim was to encourage other women writers. In 1928 Liddell represented the Society at the National Council of Women.

In November 1928 she was appointed to the Appeal Board associated with the Film Censorship Board. None of the three was reappointed by the Scullin government: Professor (later Sir) Robert S. Wallace resigned and Ernest Blackwell died; their replacements were John Le Gay Brereton and John Vincent Gould; Liddell was replaced by Mrs (later Dame) Mary Gilmore.

In 1929 Liddell was the inaugural treasurer of the N.S.W. Women Voters' Association, which later that year amalgamated with the Women's League of N.S.W. to form the United Associations, and resigned her position in the Feminist Society, as mentioned above.

== Family ==
Mary Wherry Bullock married James Crothers Liddell in 1902. Their children included:

- Edward Percival Liddell (8 February 1904 – 7 May 1968) joined the Royal Australian Navy in 1918 as a cadet midshipman and served until his retirement in 1949
- Leslie Johnston Bullock Liddell (born 8 January 1907 in Cookstown, Ireland) was a miner who enlisted in the Australian Military Force in July 1940

They had a home, "Evenvale", Upper Avenue road, Mosman, later "Trafalgar" on Marine Parade, Maroubra.
