= David Blair (encyclopaedist) =

Irish-Australian encyclopaedist and politician

David Blair (4 June 1820 – 19 February 1899) was an Irish Australian politician, journalist and encyclopaedist.

== Background ==
David Blair was born in County Monaghan, Ireland to parents of Scottish descent. He studied at the Hibernian Military School, Dublin. After leaving the school in 1835, he worked for an uncle's business but did not enjoy it.

In 1840 he obtained a job as a human calculator for the Ordnance Survey of Ireland. He was originally based in Limerick and Cork but was moved to Southampton in 1841. He kept this job, where he assisted with England's triangulation survey, for almost nine years.

== Chartism ==
Blair was so unhappy in his work that he considered joining the military. He supported the revolutionary Chartists as a lecturer in Southampton, in reading and in church activities.

== Australia ==
He later studied for the ministry in Ireland. In 1850 John Dunmore Lang incited him to go to the back country of Australia to work as a missionary. Blair got a job as a journalist for the Empire newspaper, where he met Henry Parkes as a colleague, in Sydney. Blair went to Victoria in 1852 and continued working as a journalist. He became the leader writer for The Age, where he advocated for miners' rights, and a contributor to Victorian Review.

Blair had a politically unimpactful tenure in the legislative assembly of Victoria, to which he was elected twice: once in 1856 and the second time in 1868. He was appointed Secretary to the Royal Commission on Education in 1867 and Secretary to the Penal Commission in 1873. In 1876 he wrote an introduction to and edited the Speeches of Henry Parkes. He wrote The History of Australasia--to the Establishment of Self-Government (1879), the Cyclopedia of Australasia (1881) and The First Imaginary Voyage to Australia (1882). He died at Melbourne on 19 February 1899, aged 78.

== Family ==
Blair's wife Annie McPherson was the sister of James Macpherson Grant MLA. Their daughter Florence Baverstock has been noted as a fine writer, having on occasion contributed articles for her father when he was indisposed. In September 1896 she replaced the dangerously ill Ina Wildman ("Sappho Smith") as editor of The Bulletin's Women's pages.

== Sources ==
- J. I. Roe, 'Blair, David (1820 - 1899)', Australian Dictionary of Biography, Volume 3, MUP, 1969, pp 179–180.
- E. Morris Miller & Frederick T. Macartney (1956), Australian Literature, Sydney, Angus & Robertson, p. 64.
