= Battlefields (poetry collection) =

Poetry collection by Mary Gilmore

- First edition
- Author: Mary Gilmore
- Language: English
- Genre: Poetry collections
- Publisher: Angus and Robertson
- Publication date: 1939
- Publication place: Australia
- Media type: Print
- Pages: 181 pp
- Preceded by: Under the Wilgas
- Followed by: Pro Patria and Other Poems

Battlefields (1939) is a collection of poetry by Australian poet Mary Gilmore.

The collection consists of 124 poems, the majority of which are published for the first time in this volume.

== Contents ==
- "The Ringer (El Campeador)"
- "Coronation Anthem (1937)"
- "Ode to the Pioneer Women"
- "The Woman of Six Fields"
- "Old Henry Parkes"
- "For Anzac (1939)"
- "The Old Brigade"
- "Battlefields"
- "The Jews"
- "The Yarran-Tree"
- "To My Brother Hugh"
- "El Barcaldino"
- "The Old Schoolfellows"
- "The Clansman's Call"
- "The Snipe"
- "This Many a Day"
- "The Rider"
- "The Mother"
- "Alison of the Marge"
- "The Road"
- "The House of Hourne"
- "They Pray"
- "Remembering"
- "Memorial (Helen Hughes)"
- "Japan"
- "Spain : Isabella to Columbus"
- "Barcelona"
- "Written for Neville Cayley"
- "The Birds"
- "I Saw the Beauty Go"
- "Identity"
- "Storm"
- "Wake Not the Sleeper"
- "At Eventide"
- "An Old Man Speaks"
- "The Archibald Fountain"
- "The Sea"
- "The Question"
- "Sic Transit"
- "The Baying Hounds"
- "Unskilled"
- "Tall Buildings"
- "Widow's Pensions"
- "Rain"
- "He Has Not Older Grown"
- "The Sempstress"
- "The Dead Baby"
- "Wintered Life"
- "The Bonnet Shop"
- "The Crow"
- "The Waif"
- "Ruth"
- "Recording Man"
- "On the War-Mongers"
- "Los Heridos"
- "They Hanged a Man on Gallows Hill (Goulburn)"
- "Christmas Carol"
- "The Fisherman"
- "Previsioned"
- "Ring Bells So Lightly"
- "Edwardian Coronation Anthem"
- "Aboriginal Themes"
- "Corroboree"
- "The Song of Kooralinga"
- "The Quandong Tree"
- "The Rogery Birds"
- "Truganini"
- "Widowed"
- "The Rescuer"
- "Of Certain Critics"
- "Shall Man Say Beauty Passes"
- "The Mushroom"
- "Thistledown"
- "The Tenancy"
- "The Wanderer"
- "Vignettes : I : The Harvesters"
- "Vignettes : III : On Such a Night"
- "Vignettes : II : Rain in Autumn at Goulburn"
- "Vignettes : IV : The Vineyard"
- "The Wild Plum"
- "The White Heron"
- "The Loving Heart"
- "Honing up the Hill"
- "Spring"
- "Rittle-Rattle-Rittle"
- "The Complaint"
- "Sibylla"
- "Said the Elizabeth Bay Fig-Tree"
- "The Shepherd"
- "Unresting"
- "Loss"
- "The Stoic"
- "Contest I Ask"
- "Horn Mad I' the Moon"
- "Mariquita De Sapucaay"
- "Insurgent"
- "Winte Song"
- "She Praises Him"
- "Once E'er She Slept"
- "All Yesterday"
- "Eyes of the Heart"
- "Say to Him"
- "The Prodigal"
- "Vilanelle of Parting"
- "The Arras"
- "The Promise"
- "From the Spanish"
- "The Rose"
- "This Have I Seen"
- "Randwick Military Hospital"
- "Vae Victus"
- "Poor Nelly"
- "The Constant Heart"
- "Forgiven"
- "Vilanelle to Beauty"
- "1936"
- "The Little Shoes that Died"
- "In Memoriam (Jessie Mackay of New Zealand)"
- "The Pilgrim"
- "The Night is Long"
- "First is of Men"
- "The Ember Flame"
- "Affinity"
- "In Life's Sad School"

== Reviews ==
The Courier-Mail noted the publication of the collection in an editorial, stating: "This delightful book, with its six score poems and one, proves that the well of poetry in her heart has not dried up, and if they have not all been drawn from that fountain within the last lustrum (though many are quite recent) they are all well worth preserving. These pages, as might be expected, have the wistfulness of an aftermath garnered at eventide and tinged with the light of sunset...Her ear has never been dulled to "the still, sad music of humanity" by the glitter and clatter of this swiftly-moving age."

The Cambridge Guide to Women's Writing in English noted that the collection "maintains earlier ambivalences towards warfare, but the balance here is less towards praising the heroism of war's soldiers ("For Anzac (1939)") and more toward attacking those addressed in "To the War-Mongers"...In a wider sense, however, Gilmore engages with other social and political battlefields."

== Notes ==
- Dedication: To Hugh McCrae and Raynor Hoff
