= Helen Loring Grenfell =

American educator, suffragist, and clubwoman (1863–1935)

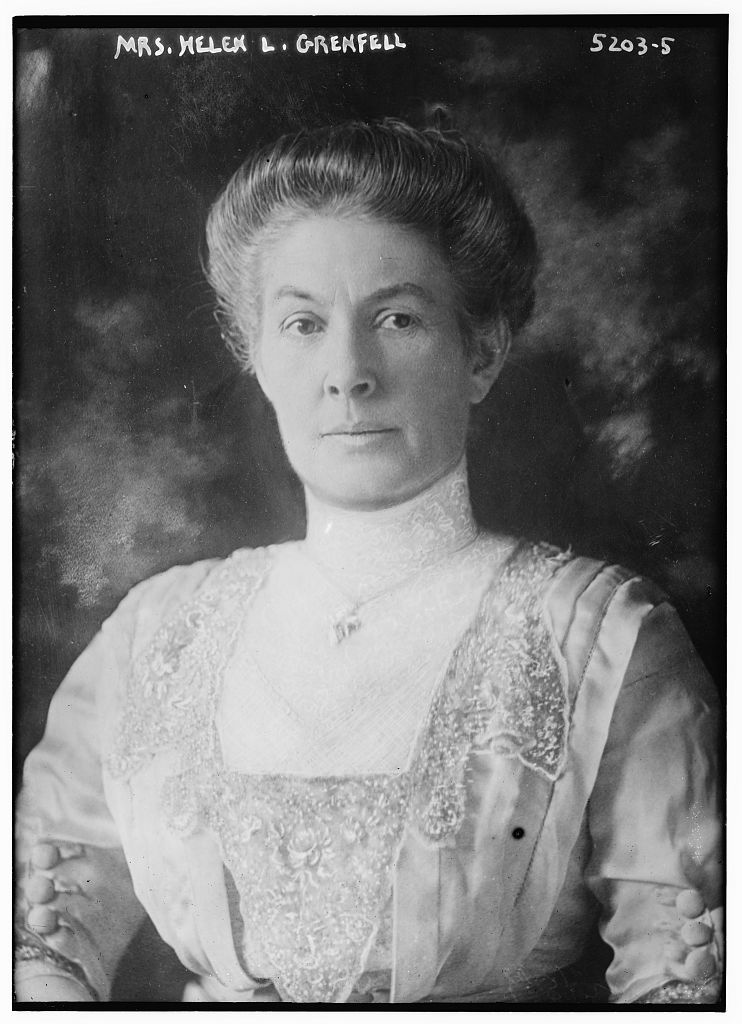
Helen Loring Grenfell, Representative Women of Colorado, 1914

Helen Loring Grenfell (April 29, 1863 — July 25, 1935) was an American educator, suffragist, and clubwoman. She was Colorado's Superintendent of Public Instruction from 1899 to 1905.

== Early life ==
Helen Thatcher Loring was born in Valparaiso, Chile, the daughter of American parents Charles Loring and Mary Frances Loring. Her father was in Chile on business at the time of her birth there. She moved to Colorado as a child with her parents. She trained to teach in New York.

== Career ==
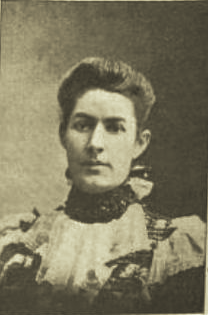
1902

Helen Loring taught school in Colorado from her teen years. She was appointed superintendent of schools for Gilpin County, Colorado in 1895. She was elected Colorado's state Superintendent of Public Instruction in 1898, and re-elected to two more two-year terms, serving through 1905. She was elected vice-president of the National Educational Association (NEA) in 1902. She was defeated in her run for a third re-election in 1904, by Katherine L. Craig. In 1909 she published a report, The Constitution of the Ideal School Board and the Citizen's Duty Toward it.

As an elected official, she toured nationally lecturing in favor of suffrage. "We have come to the time when we must feel that the word chivalry belongs to the past," she told audiences, "I believe you will not misunderstand me when I say that if you will give us justice, it will mean a great deal more than chivalry ever did." She served on Colorado's prison board for two terms. She was a member of the state forestry association and on the board of trustees for Denver's children's hospital. In 1920, she was a delegate to the Democratic National Convention. She was chair of the Women's Auxiliary of the Retail Clerks International Protective Association. She also spoke in favor of better compensation for teachers.

Grenfell made a report to Woodrow Wilson on the Ludlow Massacre, as vice president of the Women's Law and Order League of Colorado. Her report was more critical of the strikers and more aligned with the governor's actions than many other accounts from the event.

== Personal life ==
Helen Loring married Edwin I. Grenfell, a railroad executive, in 1889. She died in 1935, aged 71 years, from injuries sustained in a fall several months earlier. Her husband wrote a biography after her death, A Brief Sketch of the Life and Works of Helen Thatcher Loring Grenfell (1939).
