= James Edmond =

Scottish-Australian journalist and writer

Caricature by David Low

James Edmond (21 April 1859 – 21 March 1933) was a Scottish-Australian journalist and writer of short stories, and notable as an editor of The Bulletin. Edmond was born in Glasgow, the son of James Edmond, carpet-maker, and his wife Janet, née Dickson.

Edmund Close, in the Canberra suburb of Gilmore, is named in his honour.
