= Alexina Maude Wildman =

Australian journalist, columnist and poet

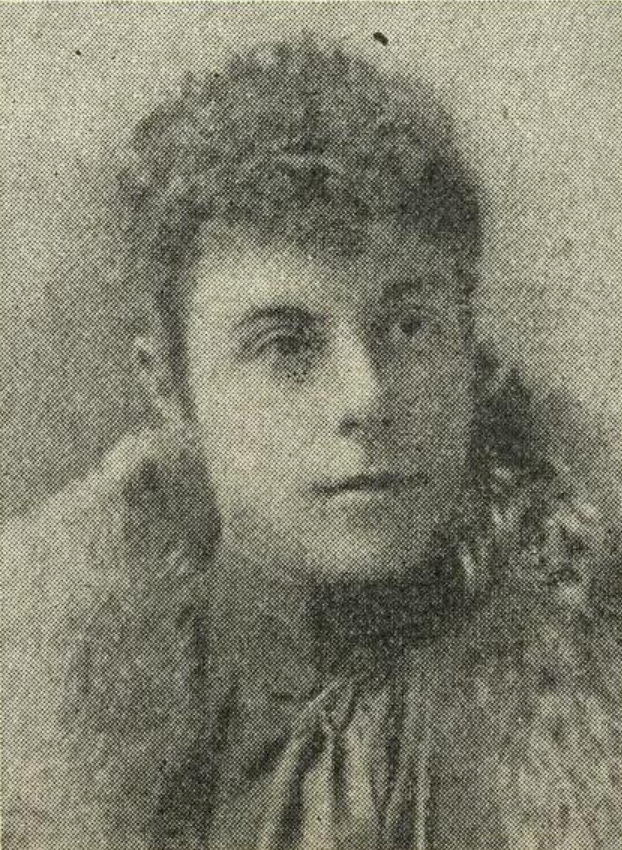
- Born: 28 February 1867; Paddington, New South Wales
- Died: 15 November 1896 (aged 29); Waverley, New South Wales
- Other names: Ina Wildman; Sappho Smith
- Occupation: Writer
- Years active: 1888–1896
- Known for: Writing columns for The Bulletin

Alexina Maude Wildman (28 February 1867 – 15 November 1896), also known as Ina Wildman, was an Australian journalist and columnist, known for writing weekly columns for The Bulletin magazine under her pen name "Sappho Smith". The first of her weekly columns appeared in the magazine on 28 April 1888. The column was written as a letter to "my dear Moorabinda," headed with a cartoon image of an old woman. The column contained a variety of information about current events, often portrayed in a sarcastic, critical way. It was the first gossip column in Sydney. Wildman's last column appeared on 22 August 1896, a few months before her death from nephritis in Waverley, New South Wales.

== Early life ==
Wildman was born in Paddington, New South Wales on 28 February 1867. Her mother was Elizabeth Wildman and her father was Edwin Wildman, a clerk who was commercially involved with the Sydney Morning Herald. The couple had seven girls and three boys before Alexina was born. She preferred to be called Ina.

Wildman began writing poetry as a child. She submitted her work to The Bulletin in 1885 at age 18 but it was declined, causing her to complain in person. J. F. Archibald was the editor and co-owner of the newspaper, and he believed that women could not write poetry. Despite this, Wildman was eventually able to join the staff of The Bulletin and worked there for most of her adult life.

== The Bulletin career ==
For the Australian magazine The Bulletin Wildman published a single column every week. The column generally had its own page, and began with a cartoon image of a widow with glasses and a fan, described as an "ugly, sour, old woman", created by Philip William May. Wildman may have portrayed herself as an old woman to contrast her real age, as a columnist so young at the time was very uncommon.

The column was written by Wildman under the pen name Sappho Smith, in the form of a letter addressed to "my dear Moorabinda". Wildman created the pen name for the sole purpose of preventing the newspaper's readers from guessing the real writer of the column.

The column was first published in the magazine on 28 April 1888 and soon became successful and widely read. The column likely was read more during its time than any other column in The Bulletin. It was the first gossip column in Sydney; The Bulletin had wanted to change its role at the time to be "controversial and entertaining".

The column contained a large variety of different items and information which would interest readers, generally about current events, such as weddings and parties, describing them mockingly, as well as giving her own comments and observations. Wildman described the column as having "a medley of all sorts of things that are running through my head." Some examples of what she wrote about include commenting that Brisbane was a "city of yellow-faced men" and in a column in 1894, calling Annie Besant, a theosophist and socialist, "quite a little East Lynne on wheels". Some of the comments by Wildman, such as the one ridiculing Brisbane, are thought to have represented the opinions of other editors of the magazine and what they wanted published, rather than Wildman's personal beliefs.

Despite having been a supporter of independence and a professional, Wildman's writings were very unfavorable of women and their activism, criticizing the New Woman movement. She wrote negatively towards women who thought that more governesses were needed in the colony and particularly criticized women who did not eat so that they would have a more appealing look, writing the following in one of her columns:

And now that balls are to be once more set a-rolling, I would warn those girls who think to captivate men by the display of an appetite the size of a sickly butterfly's, that the average man doesn't approve of a girl who takes a spoonful of jelly and a sip of liquid and is ready to be taken back to the ball-room again. No, they don't. The men want time to refresh themselves, too. They like a girl who negotiates something tangible with a knife and fork, and gives them time to surround a due and proper amount of cold fowl and champagne. Speaking of ball suppers: At a Wagga hop the other week one of the M.C.'s attacked a calves foot jelly with a knife and fork, after he had copiously peppered and salted it! What do you think of that, now? That Wagga man almost outdoes the Frenchman whom I once saw mix rhubarb with mashed potatoes.

Wildman frequently wrote critically about Janet Achurch, an actress of the time, in her column. In 1889, her second year working for the magazine, Wildman wrote in a ridiculing way, "Miss Achurch, I hear, belongs to the artistically untidy school, cuddles her knees, and disturbs the conventionalities". After meeting the actress in real life in 1890, Wildman stopped criticizing her and instead wrote kindly about her, praising her acting as superb, and calling her costume "a dressmaker’s marvel".

The column continued to appear weekly until 22 August 1896, a few months before Wildman's death. Wildman did not send any kind of notice to the newspaper's readers when she stopped writing the column; the issue on 22 August showed no intention of being the last.

== Reception ==
Wildman received much praise for her writing; Ellen Joy Todd, a journalist, was impressed with her poems and called her "a sympathetic soul". According to the Australian Dictionary of Biography, she was called "a brilliant writer and a good comrade" by the people with whom she worked and was known as "the incomparable Ina Wildman". An editor for The Bulletin called her "slender, attractive rather than pretty, charming of manner and childlike in some respects". After her death, The Australian Star named her as the most popular journalist in Australia at the time. The Mitchell Library of the State Library of New South Wales holds eight poems written by Wildman.

== Death ==
In 1894, following an infection, Wildman developed nephritis, a kidney disease which at the time was classified as Bright's disease. She travelled to Queensland, in hopes of improving her health enough to travel all the way to Europe; however, her health declined quickly, and she died at her home on Cowper Street, Waverley, New South Wales on 15 November 1896, age 29, two years after she was first infected. She was buried at a local cemetery in a section reserved for Anglicans.

Wildman was succeeded as women's editor in the Bulletin by Florence Baverstock, daughter of David Blair.
