= Magarey =

Magarey may refer to:

Surname

- Rupert Magarey, Sir Rupert Magarey FRCS (1914–1990) was an Australian medical practitioner and surgeon
- Susan Magarey, South Australian historian, biographer, author and academic
- Sylvanus James Magarey (1850–1901) South Australian physician and parliamentarian, son of Thomas, father of Frank
- Thomas Magarey (1825-1902), Irish-born South Australian miller, pastoralist, businessman and politician
- William Ashley Magarey (1868–1929), South Australian lawyer, originator of the Magarey Medal
- William James Magarey (1840–1920) South Australian politician

Things

- Magarey Medal
  - List of Magarey Medallists
- Magarey Medal for biography

Places

- Magarey, South Australia, a locality in the Wattle Range Council
- Hundred of Magarey, one of the Lands administrative divisions of South Australia
