= Clara Morison =

Novel by Catherine Helen Spence

Clara Morison: A Tale of South Australia During the Gold Fever
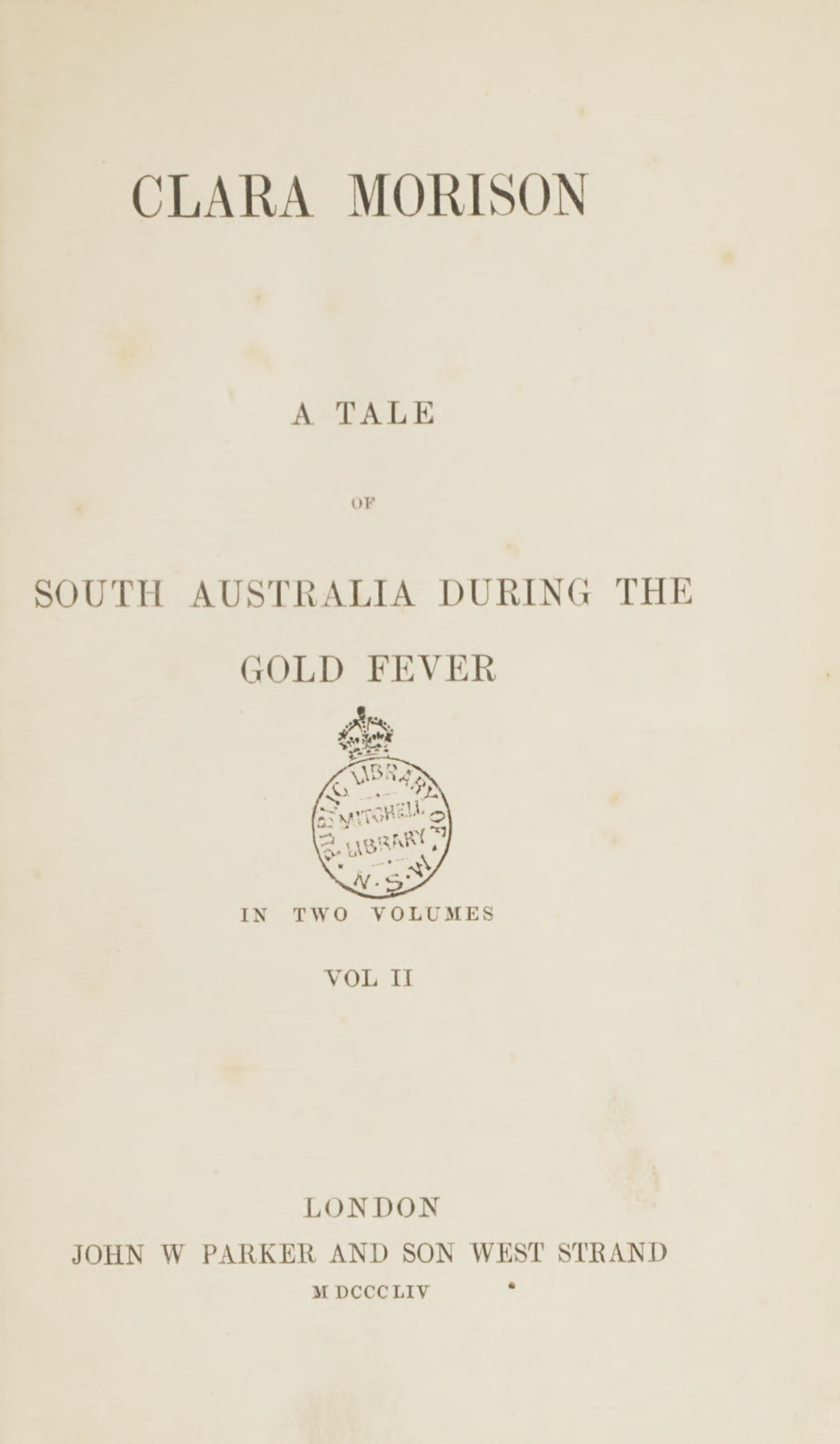
- Author: Catherine Helen Spence
- Publisher: John W. Parker & Sons
- Publication date: 1854

Clara Morison: A Tale of South Australia During the Gold Fever is an 1854 novel by Catherine Helen Spence.

The novel was published in 1854. It recounts the story of a young woman named Clara Morison who arrives in Australia from Scotland in 1850. It is a work of domestic realism that takes place largely in ordinary domestic settings inhabited by women in the early years of the South Australian colony. After the death of her father, Clara is told by her uncle that he cannot support both her and her sister, and that she should emigrate to South Australia where she will have greater opportunities for employment and marriage. Upon her arrival she ends up in a boarding house and is treated poorly. She seeks work as a governess, but is ultimately forced to accept employment as a maid. As she experiences the difficulties of life as a domestic servant, she spends her free time reading and writing journals and sermons. The plot centres on the courtship between Clara and a squatter named Charles Reginald, who is secretly engaged to marry a woman in England and plans to return home once he has earned enough money in South Australia.

Like much of Spence's writing, Clara Morison takes a romantic view of the uniqueness of the colony of South Australia. It also emphasises the role of women in the colony's formation. South Australia was founded by British liberals who wished to establish an Australian colony rooted in liberal civic principles rather than convict transportation and religious authority. The colony's founders established freedom of commerce and worship as central pillars of their new society, and set up schemes to ensure a balance between male and female emigrants. The colony was also founded on the idea that the population should be made up of families—men were banned from emigrating while leaving their wives and children at home, and single new arrivals were encouraged to marry. In the novel Clara and Charles eventually marry and establish a family home in the South Australian bush. The character of Charles has been described as a portrayal of the idealised colonial man who embraces his role as one of the builders of a new Australian society.

The novel also explores many of the challenges of life in early colonial Adelaide, particularly for women. Clara witnesses the tension between British class hierarchies and social structures, and the need to adapt these structures to the requirements of life in the new colony. The novel also depicts many of the risks that women faced when entering a marriage during the early colonial period, including the possibility of being abandoned by a spouse or tricked into entering a bigamous marriage by a secretly married man. The novel takes place in the context of the gold rush in Victoria, which attracts many men from South Australia and exacerbates this anxiety by causing social upheaval and economic and demographic challenges for the new colony.

== General references ==
=== Works cited ===
- Hammond, Lee (1995). "Catherine Helen Spence's Clara Morison: A Tale of South Australia During the Gold Fever". Cabbages and Kings. 23: 3–9. ISSN 0310-1584.
- Uhr, John (2020). "Catherine Spence's Clara Morison". Novel Politics: Studies in Australian Political Fiction. Carlton: Melbourne University Press. pp. 29–44. ISBN 9780522875973.
- Sharp, Sarah (2019). "'Your vocation is marriage': systematic colonisation, the marriage plot and finding home in Catherine Helen Spence's Clara Morison (1854)". Scottish Literary Review. 11 (1): 27–45. hdl:2164/15330. ISSN 2050-6678.
- Smith, Rosalind (2001). "Clara Morison: The politics of feminine heterotopia". Southerly. Vol. 61, no. 3. pp. 40–51. ISSN 0038-3732.
- Magarey, Susan (2010) [1985]. Unbridling the Tongues of Women: A Biography of Catherine Helen Spence. Adelaide: University of Adelaide Press. ISBN 978-0-9806723-1-2.
