= Handfasted =

Novel by Catherine Helen Spence

- Author: Catherine Helen Spence
- Publisher: Penguin Books
- Publication date: 1984
- ISBN: 0140075054

Handfasted is a novel by the Australian writer and social reformer Catherine Helen Spence. The novel is a work of feminist speculative fiction that depicts a lost utopian settlement named Columba founded by Scottish explorers in Central America. In Columba, a system of trial marriages called "handfasting" has contributed to the development of a utopian society where women are more equal to men. The narrative centres on the romance between a Scottish-Australian man named Hugh Keith and a Columban woman named Liliard Abercrombie.

Spence completed Handfasted in 1879 and submitted the manuscript to a literary competition, but it was rejected by the judges due to what they viewed as its radical and subversive themes. After remaining unpublished for over a century, the novel was ultimately released by Penguin Books in 1984. Analysis of the novel has discussed its depictions of marriage, social reform, and the politics of the settler colony.

== Plot summary ==
Handfasted is structured in five books. In the first book, an Australian doctor of Scottish descent named Hugh Keith is introduced. As he prepares to embark on a year of travel before settling into his career, his grandmother tells him the story of a group of Scottish explorers who set out to found a new colony in the Americas in 1745 and disappeared.

In the second book, Hugh finds the settlement founded by the lost colonists in Central America, which they named Columba. He is introduced to the society's practice of "handfasting", in which couples live together for a year and one day before deciding whether to marry. The children born during a handfasting can be given away by their parents to be raised communally as "God's bairns". These children are educated to become future leaders of the society, and are the only Columban children who are taught to read and write. Hugh meets a woman named Liliard Abercrombie, who is independent, intellectually curious, and a powerful orator. She desires more opportunities than are available to her in Columba.

The third book of the novel contains the journal of Marguerite Keith, one of Columba's founders. She explains that the practice of handfasting arose to facilitate marriages between Native American women and Scottish settlers by allowing time for the women to convert to Christianity. She also recounts her early life in the years before Columba's founding, and describes becoming trapped in an engagement that resulted in an unhappy marriage despite having fallen in love with another man.

In the novel's fourth book, Liliard finishes her first period of handfasting and enters into a second handfasting with Hugh. In the novel's final book, Liliard and Hugh travel back to Australia through Europe and America. They encounter the polygamous Mormon communities of Utah and visit the cities of New York and San Francisco. They are judged harshly as a result of their unmarried cohabitation, causing Liliard to feel increasingly constrained by the social expectations placed on women outside of Columba and the lack of a place for her in Victorian society. Despite Liliard's earlier determination to wait until the end of their handfasting before deciding whether to marry Hugh, in London she contracts smallpox and ultimately agrees to marry him. They arrive in Melbourne a year and a day after beginning their handfasting, by which time Liliard has given birth to a child.

== Publication history ==
Catherine Helen Spence wrote the manuscript for Handfasted in 1879 and submitted it to a literary competition run by The Sydney Mail for a prize of 100 pounds. Spence recalled that the competition's judges rejected it on the grounds that the novel was "calculated to loosen the marriage tie—it was too socialistic, and consequently dangerous". The handwritten manuscript was placed in the State Library of South Australia along with Spence's other papers in 1922.

Handfasted was eventually published for the first time by Penguin Books in 1984, with support from the Australian government's Australia Council. It was edited by Helen Thomson, who made some alterations and omissions to the original unedited manuscript in an attempt to render the novel "much as it would have been had it been published in Spence's own lifetime".

== Themes ==
=== Women's rights ===
Handfasted suggests that women's inequality is ultimately the result of constraints on women's sexuality, and that without the strict norms that govern women's sexual behaviour, women would be liberated in other domains. By eradicating the sexual double standards placed on women, handfasting has addressed other inequalities that women faced, including illegitimacy, spousal abandonment, marital unhappiness, and prostitution. The social structures that surround marriage in Columba also provide women with agency in choosing their spouses, contributing to women's economic freedom and allowing them to take on active roles in public life. Spence contrasts this with Liliard's experience outside of Columba, where she is forced to adapt to strict Victorian moral codes and initially feels constrained by societal expectations.

=== Social reform ===
Handfasted is written as a work of speculative fiction about a potential alternative path of social development. Columba is presented as a utopia that is symbolically free of religious doctrines of original sin, allowing its residents to live according to a rationalist and utilitarian way of life. Spence suggests that Columba's social structures were also shaped by the influence of its "Founding Mother". However, the novel suggests that Columba's social development has not been without negative consequences, particularly its society's lack of interest in literature and the arts.

Handfasted also mirrors many of the topics of Spence's own social reform efforts, depicting the acceleration of her own efforts at improving women's and children's rights. Columba's girls are more educated than its boys, and "orphaned" children are given the greatest access to education. This serves as a reversal of the inequalities that Spence witnessed in her own society; Spence spent much of her life working to improve the lives of orphaned and institutionalised children, and was a campaigner for girls' education.

=== Settler colonies ===
Like much of Spence's writing, Handfasted celebrates the Australian colony and concludes that it is in some sense the true utopia. Handfasted suggests that Columba's isolation has allowed for its radical social experimentation, and that its unique practices would not survive contact with the outside world. According to Thomson, the novel suggests that Australia provides a similar laboratory for humanist and rationalist social experimentation. The scholar Terra Walson Joseph agrees, arguing that Columba shows "both the limits and potentials" of the independent settler society; a society that has developed into something nearing a utopia, but that is trapped in stasis by its ability to open up to the outside world without sacrificing its uniqueness. She adds that Hugh and Liliard's journey is used to imply that settler colonies can serve as sites for rationalist social reform due to their separation from Britain, concluding that the novel "illustrates the degree to which utopian feminism itself was embedded in a settler colonial imaginary".

== Reception ==
In her biography of Spence, Susan Magarey describes the novel as a "remarkable work". She writes that it has many similarities with Charlotte Perkins Gilman's later novel Herland, often regarded as the founding work of feminist speculative fiction. Both Magarey and the novel's editor Susan Thomson describe the third book of Handfasted—the diaries of Marguerite Keith—as particularly powerful and moving. Thomson writes that the diaries provide "a timeless portrait of woman's lot", depicting the struggles and personal tragedies that Keith endured before becoming Columba's matriarch.

Reviewing the book in The Age upon its release, Helen Daniel wrote that its publication was an "important literary event". She remarked that while the plot was at times thin, the novel had both historical and literary appeal, and that Spence's vision of feminist utopia was "intriguing" and relevant to modern feminists. Myfanwy Gollan similarly remarked in a review of the book in The Sydney Morning Herald that while its first half served more as a historical record of the ideals of 19th-century social reformers, the narrative of the second half would appeal to modern readers. A review of the book in The Sydney Morning Herald by L. V. Kepert described its love affair as "charming" and wrote that the story featured moments of suspense and quiet humour. In a review of the book for The Observer, Anthony Thwaite wrote that the novel had a tendency to drag on at times, but that it served as a "notable addition to utopian literature" and had similar features to later works by William Morris and Edward Bellamy.
