= Catherine Helen Spence =

Australian writer, preacher, and reformer (1825–1910)

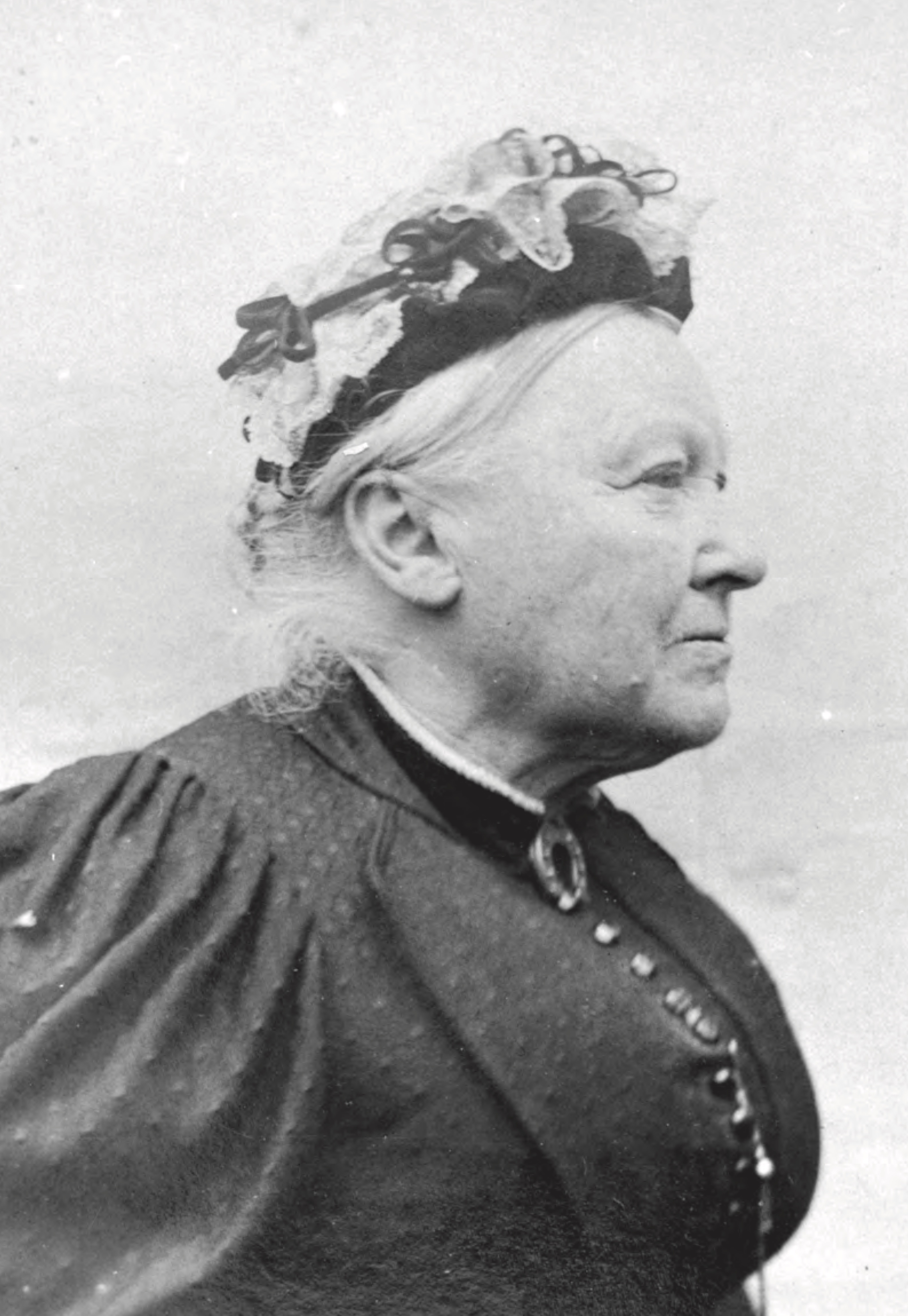
- Spence, c. 1900
- Born: 31 October 1825; Melrose, Scotland
- Died: 3 April 1910 (aged 84); Norwood, South Australia
- Writing career
- Notable works: Clara Morison; Handfasted; Mr Hogarth's Will

Catherine Helen Spence (31 October 1825 – 3 April 1910) was a Scottish-born Australian writer, preacher, and social reformer. Spence began her career as a writer of fiction, and later used her journalism and public speaking to become an influential public figure in the colony of South Australia. By the time of her death, she was widely eulogised as the "Grand Old Woman of Australia". She advocated for a range of causes, including electoral reform, women's suffrage, poverty relief, and girls' education. She was also a regular lay preacher at the Adelaide Unitarian Christian Church.

In 1897 Spence became Australia's first female political candidate when she ran in the Australasian Federal Convention election. She served on South Australia's State Children's Council and Destitute Board, and co-founded a society to oversee South Australia's first foster care system. She was an activist for proportional representation and electoral reform in the years leading up to the federation of Australia. She also campaigned for women's suffrage and for the improvement of women's opportunities for education and employment.

Spence wrote a substantial body of fiction, non-fiction and journalism. While her novels were not widely read during her lifetime, her fiction has since attracted wider attention as part of a wave of renewed interest in previously ignored works written by women. She has been described as one of the pioneers of Australian feminist and realist fiction. Spence also wrote multiple non-fiction works, including political pamphlets, an unfinished autobiography, and Australia's first civics textbook.

== Biography ==
=== Early life ===
Catherine Helen Spence was born on 31 October 1825 in Scotland near Melrose. Her father David Spence was a lawyer, while her mother Helen (née Brodie) was descended from a family of tenant farmers. Her parents were both members of the Church of Scotland and held reformist political views. Catherine and her seven siblings were all well-educated, with Catherine and one of her younger sisters attending a local day school. In 1839 her father lost a substantial sum of money after investing in a speculative wheat venture, spoiling Catherine's plans of pursuing further education in Edinburgh. The venture also destroyed her father's reputation, which was essential to his work as a lawyer, forcing the family to leave Scotland and move to South Australia. Catherine and four of her siblings left Scotland with their mother in July 1839.

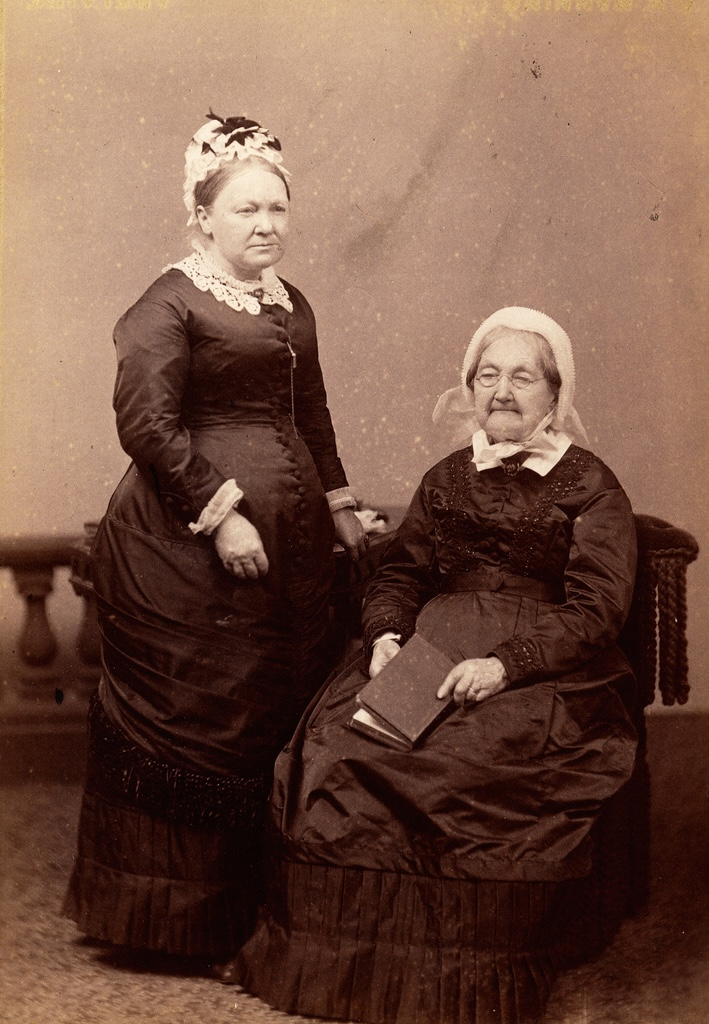
Catherine Helen Spence and her mother Helen Brodie Spence, c. 1880

Spence arrived in the three-year-old colony of South Australia at the age of 14 in November 1839. Upon their arrival in Australia the family spent seven months camping in a tent near Brownhill Creek. There, they kept a small herd of cows and made money from selling their milk. They returned to Adelaide around the middle of 1840 and moved into a house in West Terrace. Spence later stated that these were among the most miserable years of her life, saying that she "suffered from the want of some intellectual activity and from the sense of frustrated ambition and religious despair". The family was forced to sell their cows and found little success trying to farm a 32 ha (80 acres) plot that they purchased.

It was at that time that she witnessed one of the earliest uses of proportional representation, when a quota-based PR system was used in the 1840 Adelaide municipal election, due to the persuasion of Rowland Hill. Her father was the town clerk who oversaw the election.

In 1842, at the age of 17, Spence found employment as a governess for the children of the postmaster Henry Watts, the Surveyor-General Edward Charles Frome, and the governor's Private Secretary Alfred Mundy.

According to her autobiography, Spence received two marriage proposals during these years but chose to remain unmarried. She later explained:

The first [proposal] might have been accepted if it had not been for the Calvinistic creed that made me shrink from the possibility of bringing children into the world with so little chance of eternal salvation, so I said 'No' to a very clever young man, with whom I argued on many points and with whom, if I had married him, I should have argued until one of us died! I was 17, and had just begun to earn money. I told him why I refused him and that it was final. In six weeks he was engaged to another woman.

Three years later, in May 1846, Spence opened her own short-lived school. She also began to contribute some anonymous writings to the South Australian. In 1850, after the closure of her school, Spence began to work as a live-in governess. She resigned from her position within the year and began attempting to make her living as a writer.

=== Career ===
==== Journalism ====
Spence began writing anonymously for newspapers in the 1840s. She contributed a regular column to the Melbourne newspaper The Argus until 1858 to provide readers with a weekly update on events in Adelaide. By 1876 she was writing for newspapers under her own name and was widely regarded as a talented writer and critic. In July 1878 she became a paid member of staff for the literary pages of the South Australian Register, replacing John Howard Clark after his death earlier that year. Her journalism has been described by the historian Susan Magarey as having a "clear, usually economical, persuasive immediacy of style". Her writing was also published outside of South Australia, including in England's Cornhill Magazine and Fortnightly Review.

She wrote on both ladylike "domestic" topics and on the social and political debates of the day, including on the South Australian colony's land management and economic policy. She often used her articles to advocate for the philanthropic and political causes in which she was involved, including poverty relief and electoral reform. She used her journalism to support the "single tax" theories espoused by the American economic theorist Henry George, to support the rational dress movement, and to call for improvements to women's education and employment opportunities. Magarey has described Spence as an early public intellectual and social historian. Her journalism was characterised by her utopian view of the South Australian colony and by her broad engagement with the writings of the other thinkers of her era.

==== Fiction writing ====
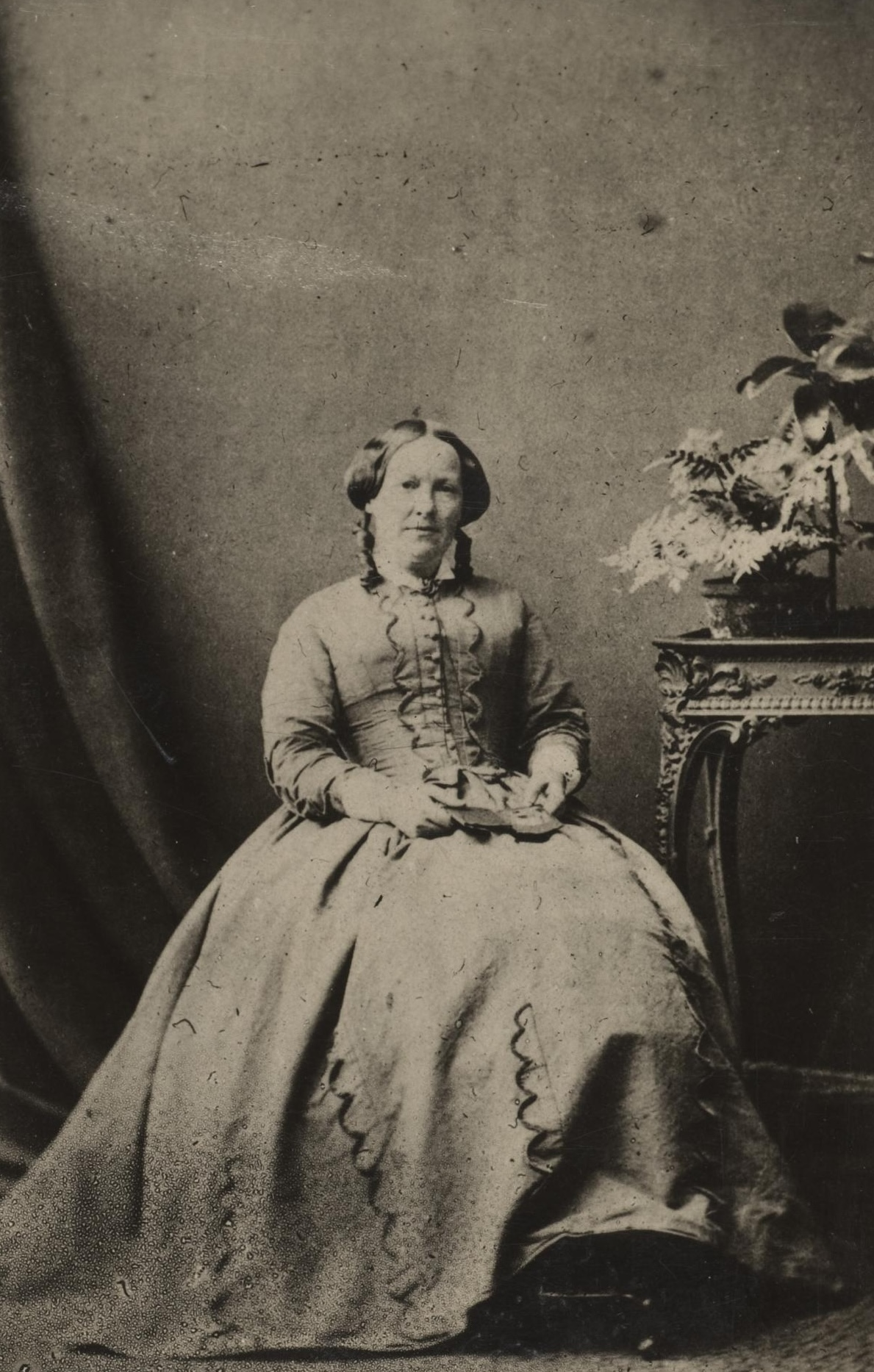
Portrait taken c. 1865

Shortly after leaving her final teaching position, Spence completed her first novel Clara Morison. She sent her manuscript to England and began writing her second novel, Tender and True. Clara Morison was initially rejected by the London publisher Smith, Elder & Company, but a friend of Spence's, William Bakewell, was able to find it an alternate publisher. It was published in two volumes in 1854 and was followed by Tender and True two years later in 1856. She published a third novel, Mr Hogarth's Will, in 1865 based on a serial she had written for the Weekly Mail the previous year. Her next novel, Gathered In, was serialised in the Adelaide Observer in 1881–82 but was not published until 1977. In 1984, more than a century after its completion, her unpublished sixth novel Handfasted was also published. Her final piece of long-form fiction, A Week in the Future, was printed as a serial in Centennial Magazine and then published in 1889. Spence made little money from her novels, which did not sell particularly well and received a warm but not overly enthusiastic critical reception during her lifetime.

==== Unitarian preaching ====
In 1850 Spence, a lifelong member of the Church of Scotland, began to have a crisis of faith and told her minister that she would no longer take communion, though at this time she still attended services. Spence had begun to find the church's Calvinist theology oppressive, writing later in her life that the "gloomy religion" had caused her to "doubt of my own salvation and despair of the salvation of any but a very small proportion of the people in the world". In 1856 she decided to become a Unitarian and joined the congregation of the Adelaide Unitarian Christian Church. Inspired by the Melbourne Unitarian minister Martha Turner, who preached at the church in Adelaide on a handful of occasions in the 1870s, Spence became a regular preacher from 1878 onwards. She delivered sermons primarily at her church in Adelaide, but also preached in Melbourne, Sydney, and in the United States. Much of her preaching, particularly in her later years, espoused her progressive ideals and her belief in social reform. Her early rejection of Calvinism also left her with a lasting scepticism of the doctrine of original sin and a theological commitment to reason and scientific progress.

==== Education and social welfare ====
Spence spent a year in Britain in 1865–66, where she became acquainted with Rosamond Davenport Hill, Frances Power Cobbe, Barbara Leigh Smith, and other feminists and social reformers. She witnessed a growing interest in philanthropy among the women in these circles, and decided to bring their causes home to South Australia. In 1866 she worked with her friend Emily Clark to lobby for a scheme to "board out" children housed in destitute asylums and other institutions with local families. In 1872, spurred by a growing crisis among destitute children who were dying of disease due to their inadequate living conditions, Spence and Clark formed the "Boarding-Out Society" and succeeded in lobbying the South Australian government to pass legislation permitting the practice. The government accepted the society's offer to take responsibility for visiting the children and supervising the scheme. The society met monthly, funded by donations from subscribers, and had 123 volunteer "visitors" at its peak. Its membership, which included the wives of many of the colony's wealthiest figures, gave it substantial influence. Spence served as the society's treasurer and intermittently as its secretary from its founding until 1886.

In 1885 a parliamentary commission recommended that a new government body be established to continue the society's work, and that Clark and Spence should be appointed to its council. Spence became a member of the State Children's Council when it was established in 1887. As part of her work for the council, Spence took on an active role in spreading and advocating for the "boarding out" model. She spoke at the Australian Charity Conference in 1890 and at the International Congress of Charities, Correction and Philanthropy in Chicago in 1893. She also wrote a history of the Boarding-Out Society and the State Children's Council named State Children in Adelaide in 1907. In 1897 she was given a position on the Destitute Board, where she focused her work on measures to prevent poverty, advocating for the creation of a compulsory savings scheme to ensure that workers would have enough saved to support themselves upon their retirement.

Beginning in the 1870s, Spence also became keenly interested in debates surrounding education reform. Her writings on education policy were published in South Australia's newspapers, and in 1877 she was given a position on the East Torrens School Board. In 1880 she wrote Australia's first textbook on civics and economics, The Laws We Live Under. Spence was also an advocate for girls' education and wrote in newspapers to defend the 1879 establishment of the Advanced School for Girls.

==== Suffrage and electoral reform ====
There was a Grand Dame of Australia
Who proved the block system a failure!
She taught creatures in coats
What to do with their votes,
The Effective Grand Dame of Australia!

— A contemporary limerick about Catherine Helen Spence's advocacy for proportional representation

One of Spence's primary political causes, particularly in her later years, was the campaign for proportional representation. Spence feared that without proportional representation, political minorities would be disenfranchised and left at the mercy of a single dominant party. In 1861 Spence wrote a pamphlet urging the adoption of Thomas Hare's system of proportional representation. The pamphlet did not attract significant attention within South Australia, but was praised by Thomas Hare and political philosopher John Stuart Mill. She spent time with Hare, Mill, and other reformers during her 1865 visit to England and deepened her interest in the cause. She featured a call for proportional representation in her 1865 romance novel Mr Hogarth's Will.

In the early 1890s, Spence began to actively campaign for proportional representation with support from the Labor Party and socialist groups. Her rationale for supporting the policy had evolved since the 1860s—rather than fearing dominance by a single party, she now feared that the democratic system would become consumed by the struggle between labour and capital, with no room for moderates or third parties to intercede. Rather than treating each state as an electorate, she supported the division of each states into multiple electorates with 5–6 representatives each. She predicted that that would produce a degree of connection between voters and representatives.

In a 12-month period beginning in February 1892 she reportedly delivered forty public lectures on the topic of proportional representation, which she rebranded as "effective voting". She toured the U.S. and Canada in the early 1890s for the cause. She delivered lectures across the United States in 1893, including at the World's Columbian Exposition in Chicago, to advocate for the cause. Her lectures were well-received in the United States and persuaded many in its nascent suffrage movement to embrace proportional representation. After her return from North America, she founded the Effective Voting League to continue advocating for the cause in South Australia.

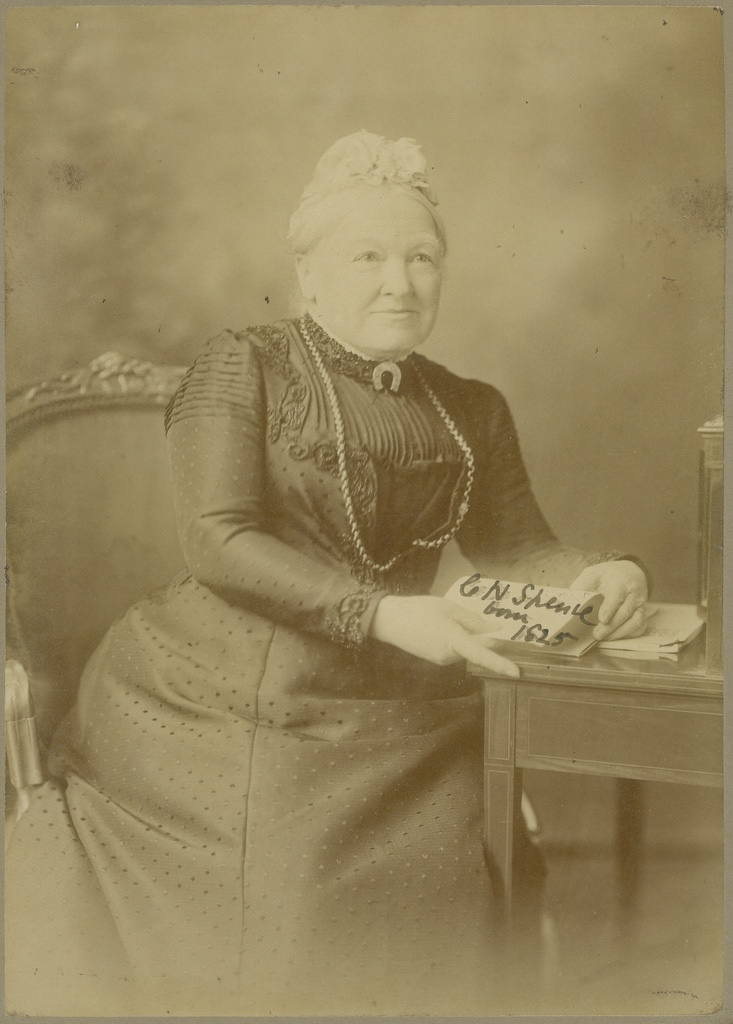
Catherine Helen Spence c. 1901

Spence also became involved in the movement for women's suffrage in the early 1890s. She attended her first meeting of the Women's Suffrage League in 1891—a major coup for the league given her public profile—and by May she had been appointed the organisation's vice-president. In 1894, while Spence was in the United States, a bill permitting women's suffrage was introduced in the South Australian parliament. Spence returned on 12 December amidst a massive mobilisation in support of the bill. The suffrage movement gave her a rapturous reception and listened to her recount her meetings with North American and European suffragists. Five days later, the South Australian parliament passed the bill, and South Australia became the first of the Australian colonies to grant women the vote.

As momentum for the cause of electoral reform and proportional representation stalled, Spence redirected her attention to the growing movement for the federation of Australia. She unsuccessfully campaigned for the use of effective voting in the 1897 Australasian Federal Convention election, then decided that she herself would run as a candidate. Despite fears that her nomination would be rejected on the basis of her gender, her candidacy was accepted and she became Australia's first female political candidate. She was not elected - only ten were elected and she placed 22nd out of 33 candidates. In the latter half of the 1890s, Spence continued her political activities by delivering lectures to the Women's League to provide women with political education, and became the vice-president of the South Australian branch of the International Council of Women. She also founded the Co-operative Clothing Company, a workers' cooperative owned wholly by women.

=== Later life and death ===
In her later years, Spence was widely known as "The Grand Old Woman of Australia". After her tour of the United States in 1894, she was reportedly viewed by many South Australians as an international celebrity. At a celebration of Spence's 80th birthday in 1905, the Chief Justice of South Australia labelled her "the most distinguished woman they had had in Australia". She began writing her autobiography shortly before her death, intending to serialize it in The Register. She died on 3 April 1910. Her autobiography was written up to the year 1887, and her friend and fellow activist Jeanne Young completed the rest from Spence's manuscripts. After its serialization, it was published as a book in 1910.

== Legacy ==
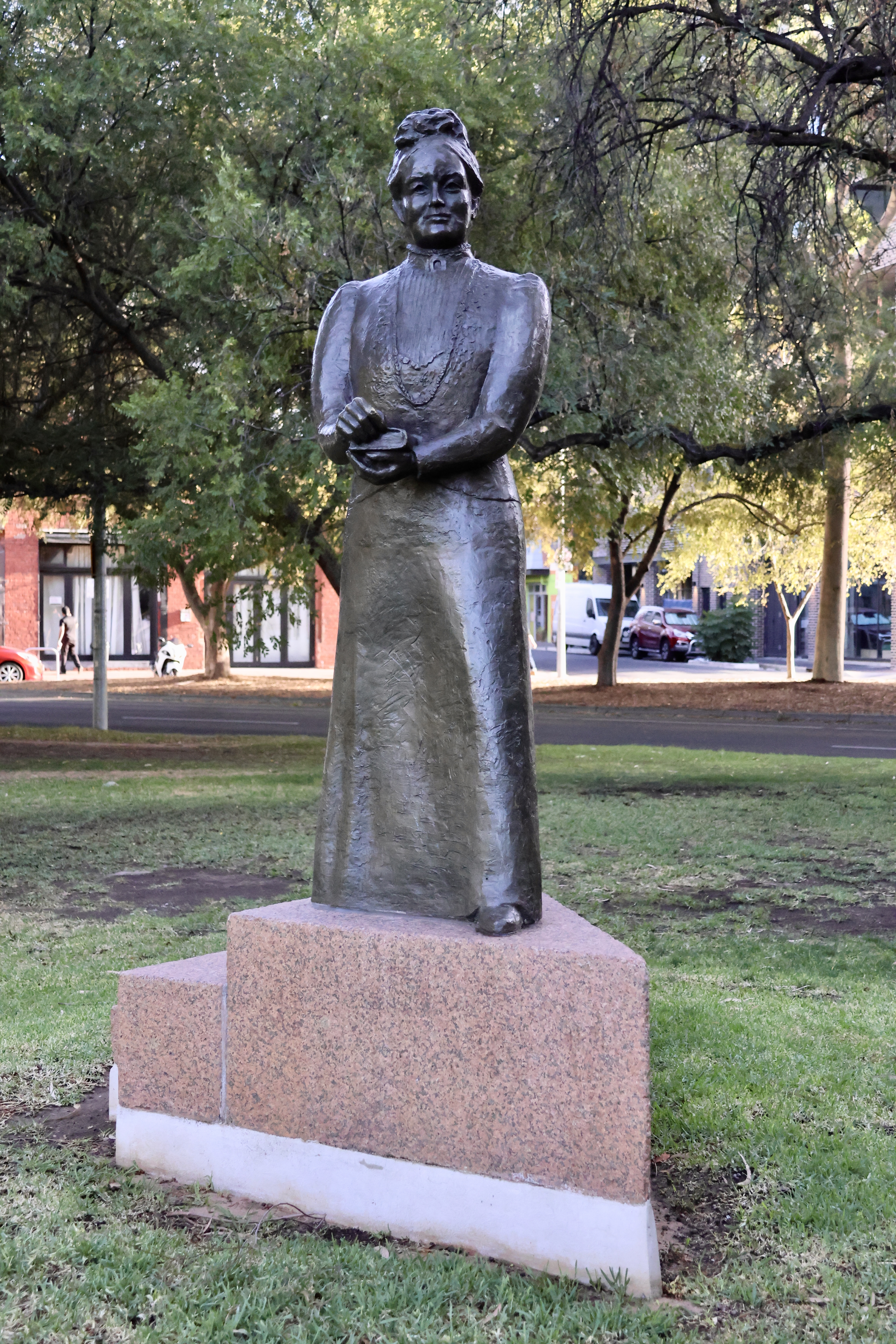
Statue of Catherine Helen Spence in Light Square, Adelaide

Upon her death, Margaret Preston was commissioned to paint a portrait of Spence, which is now displayed in the Art Gallery of South Australia. The Catherine Helen Spence Memorial Scholarship was established for South Australian women in her honour in 1911. In 1986 a statue of Spence was erected in Light Square. A wing of the State Library of South Australia, a street in Adelaide, and the federal electorate of Spence are all named after her. In 2001, Spence's portrait appeared on the Australian five-dollar note to celebrate the centenary of Australian federation.

While Spence's fiction was not particularly widely known during her lifetime, her writing began to attract greater attention from scholars beginning in the 1970s. She began to be regarded a pioneer of Australian feminist and realist fiction. Spence's final unpublished novel Handfasted was published for the first time in 1984. Several of her other novels, including Clara Morison, were also reprinted in the 1970s and 1980s.

Recent decades have seen criticism of aspects of Spence's writing and legacy. Scholars have criticised her novels for their racist portrayals of Indigenous Australians and for their implicit support for the settler colonial project. Some scholars have also argued that her vision of progressive and feminist reform emphasised the interests of white, middle-class women. The historian Kay Daniels argued that Spence's efforts to establish South Australia's first foster care system served to impose surveillance and state power on working-class women. Spence's biographer Susan Magarey, however, argues that Spence's writing and deeds indicate that her welfare efforts were sincerely rooted in class solidarity and a belief in mutual assistance rather than in a desire for middle-class domination of the poor.

== Bibliography ==
Novels

- Clara Morison: A Tale of South Australia During the Gold Fever (John W. Parker & Sons, 1854)
- Tender and True: A Colonial Tale (Elder, Smith & Co, 1856)
- Mr Hogarth's Will (Richard Bentley, 1865) (Note: First serialised in 1864 under the title Uphill Work)
- The Author's Daughter (Richard Bentley, 1868) (Note: First serialised in 1867 under the title Hugh Lindsay's Guest)
- An Agnostic's Progress from the Known to the Unknown (Williams and Norgate, 1884)
- Gathered In (Sydney University Press, 1977) ISBN 978-0-424-00041-1 (Note: First serialised in 1881–1882)
- Handfasted (Penguin Books, 1984) ISBN 978-0-14-007505-2
- A Week in the Future (Hale and Iremonger, 1987) ISBN 978-0-86806-299-0 (Note: First serialised in 1889)

Non-fiction

- A Plea for Pure Democracy (Rigby Limited, 1861)
- Some Social Aspects of South Australian Life (Kyffin Thomas, 1878)
- The Laws We Live Under (South Australian Government Printing Office, 1880)
- Effective Voting (Shawyer & Co, 1898)
- State Children in Australia: A History of Boarding Out and its Developments (Vardon, 1907)
- Catherine Helen Spence: An Autobiography, edited by Jeanne Young (W. K. Thomas & Co, 1910)
- Ever Yours, C. H. Spence, edited by Susan Magarey (Wakefield Press, 2005) ISBN 978-1-86254-656-1
