= Cabinet of Australia =

Chief group heading the Australian government

- The Cabinet Room in Parliament House

- Commonwealth Coat of Arms
- Formation: 1 January 1901; 125 years ago
- Legal status: By convention
- Purpose: Chief decision-making body of the Australian Government
- Location: Cabinet Room, Parliament House
- Prime Minister: Anthony Albanese
- Current Cabinet: Second Albanese cabinet (since 13 May 2025)
- Membership: 23 Cabinet ministers (maximum of 30 by legislation)
- Website: www.directory.gov.au/commonwealth-parliament/cabinet

The Cabinet of Australia, (Note: The use of the definite article is mixed, with references to "Cabinet" and "the Cabinet" both used.) also known as the Federal Cabinet, is the chief decision-making body of the Australian Government. The cabinet is selected by the prime minister and is composed of senior ministers of state who administer the executive departments and ministries of the federal government.

Ministers are appointed by the governor-general on the advice of the prime minister, who is the leader of the Cabinet. Cabinet meetings are strictly private and occur once a week where vital issues are discussed and policy formulated. There are several Cabinet committees focused on governance and specific policy issues, with administrative support provided by the Department of the Prime Minister and Cabinet. The outer ministry consists of junior ministers outside of Cabinet. There are also a number of assistant ministers (designated as parliamentary secretaries under the Ministers of State Act 1952) responsible for a specific policy area and reporting directly to a senior Cabinet minister of their portfolio. The Cabinet, the outer ministry, and the assistant ministers collectively form the full Commonwealth ministry of the government of the day. Officials and advisors are not allowed to attend Cabinet, with only Cabinet ministers and the three official note-takers that produce Cabinet minutes able to be present during deliberations.

The Cabinet is a product of convention and practice. There is no reference to the Cabinet in the Australian Constitution and its establishment and procedures are not the subject of any legislation. The prime minister of the day determines the shape, structure and operation of the Cabinet and its Committees.

Decisions of Cabinet (formally known as Cabinet minutes) do not in and of themselves have legal force, requiring the endorsement from individual ministers, holders of statutory office, Parliament or the governor-general as advised by the non-deliberative Federal Executive Council—the highest formal executive body mentioned in the Constitution. In practice, the Federal Executive Council meets solely to endorse and give legal force to decisions already made by the Cabinet.

== History ==
Until 1956 the Cabinet comprised all ministers. The growth of the ministry in the 1940s and 1950s made this increasingly impractical, and in 1956 Liberal Prime Minister Robert Menzies created a two-tier ministry, with only senior ministers being members of the Cabinet, while the other ministers are in the outer ministry. This practice has been continued by all governments since, with the exception of the Whitlam government.

When the non-Labor parties have been in power, the prime minister has advised the governor-general on all Cabinet and ministerial appointments at his own discretion, although in practice he consults with senior colleagues in making appointments. When the Liberal Party and its predecessors (the Nationalist Party and the United Australia Party) have been in coalition with the National Party (or its predecessor the Country Party), the leader of the junior Coalition party has had the right to nominate his party's members of the Coalition ministry, and to be consulted by the prime minister on the allocation of their portfolios. Under previous Coalition agreements, the Nationals were entitled to a certain number of ministry positions according to a formula based on the number of seats they hold as compared to the Liberals.

When Labor first held office under Chris Watson, Watson assumed the right to choose members of his cabinet. In 1907, however, the party decided that future Labor cabinets would be elected by the members of the Parliamentary Labor Party (the Caucus), with the prime minister retaining the right to allocate portfolios. This practice was followed until 2007. Between 1907 and 2007, Labor prime ministers exercised a predominant influence over who was elected to Labor ministries, although the leaders of the party factions also exercised considerable influence. However, in 2007 Prime Minister Kevin Rudd, assumed the power to choose the ministry alone. Later, the caucus regained this power in 2013. According to reporting by the Sydney Morning Herald, ministerial positions are allocated by the Left and Right factions proportionally according to their representation in the Parliament. Since 2025, affirmative action rules have also required Labor cabinets to have an equal gender split.

Under two-tier ministerial arrangements introduced in 1987, each senior or portfolio minister was a member of the Cabinet. In 1996 this was modified by the Howard government, whereby two portfolio ministers, one being the attorney-general, were not members of Cabinet, and one portfolio had two Cabinet ministers. In subsequent Howard ministries, and the 2007 Rudd Labor ministry, all portfolio ministers were in the Cabinet.

== Composition ==
A subset of government ministers are selected to form Cabinet. Ministers are drawn from both the House of Representatives and Senate. Section 64 of the Constitution in practice ensures that only parliamentarians (or soon to become parliamentarians) become ministers by limiting the term of non-parliamentarian ministers to a maximum term of only three months. (Note: This provision was included to allow the first federal ministry to be formed temporarily before the first national election in 1901.) The prime minister and treasurer are traditionally members of the House of Representatives, but the Constitution does not have such a requirement. As amended in 1987, the Minister of State Act 1952 permits up to 30 ministers. As members of one house cannot speak in the other, ministers in each house serve as representatives of colleagues in the other for answering questions and other procedures.

As of September 2023 every government since Federation has had senators serve as ministers. The Senate typically provides one-quarter to one-third of the ministry. Some former senators and others have proposed that senators should not be eligible to serve as ministers, stating that doing so is inappropriate for members of a chamber that act as the states' house and a house of review and because governments are only responsible to the House of Representatives. John Uhr and Senator Baden Teague state that an advantage of senators serving in ministries is that the Senate can compel them to answer questions about the government.

Since the introduction of the two-tier ministry, meetings of Cabinet are attended by members only, although other ministers may attend if an area of their portfolio is on the agenda. Cabinet meetings are chaired by the prime minister, and a senior public servant is present to write the minutes and record decisions.

Since 1942, every member of the Cabinet has been a member of the Australian Labor Party, the Liberal Party of Australia, or the National Party of Australia.

=== Prime minister ===
The prime minister is responsible for the membership of the Cabinet, determines and regulates all Cabinet arrangements for the government and is the final arbiter of Cabinet procedures. As chair of the cabinet, the prime minister sets the Cabinet's agenda and determines when and where meetings take place. The prime minister leads and guides discussion to achieve a collective response; however where a collective decision is not possible, the prime minister's view is authoritative.

== Principles of operation ==
The Australian Cabinet follows the traditions of the British parliamentary cabinet system. This entails collective decision-making and responsibility, Cabinet solidarity and confidentiality.

=== Collective decision-making and responsibility ===
The role of collective decision-making reflects the parliamentary tradition that the confidence given to governments by the House of Representatives is collective, rather than towards individual ministers. Similarly, the governor-general, in acting on ministerial advice, needs to be confident that they only give effect to government policy. In practice this means that a decision of the Cabinet is binding on all members of the government, regardless of whether they were present when the decision was taken or their personal views. Issues are debated within the confidential setting of Cabinet meetings so that some form of consensus can be summarised by the prime minister, as chair of the Cabinet, to be recorded in the Cabinet minute.

=== Cabinet solidarity ===
Cabinet collective responsibility is most obviously expressed in the principle of Cabinet solidarity. In governments using the Westminster system, members of the Cabinet must publicly support all government decisions made in Cabinet, even if they do not agree with them. Cabinet ministers cannot dissociate themselves from, or repudiate the decisions of, their Cabinet colleagues unless they resign from the Cabinet.

=== Confidentiality ===
The principle of collective responsibility requires that ministers should be able to express their views frankly in Cabinet meetings in the expectation that they can argue freely in private while maintaining a united front in public when decisions have been reached. This in turn requires that opinions expressed in the Cabinet and Cabinet Committees, including in documents and any correspondence, are treated as confidential. As such, Cabinet documents are broadly immune from Freedom of Information Act requests. All Cabinet documents are destroyed once they are no longer needed or at a change of government, with the exception of Cabinet records and Cabinet notebooks which since 1986 are released after 30 years. Cabinet documents are considered the property of the political government of the day, with access by successive governments only granted by request. However, the documents themselves are not legally protected, allowing the Australian Broadcasting Corporation (ABC) in 2018 to publish some Cabinet documents found in filing cabinets whose keys had been lost and subsequently sold at a government surplus auction. The documents revealed the inner workings of recent governments, and were characterised by the ABC as the largest breach of cabinet security in the nation's history.

== Cabinet committees ==
As with other Westminster system cabinets, Cabinet committees play an important role in the effectiveness of the Cabinet system and providing avenues for collective decision-making on particular policy issues. As of 2026, the Cabinet committees are:

The National Security Committee (NSC) focuses on major security issues of strategic importance to Australia. Decisions of the NSC do not require the endorsement of the Cabinet. The NSC is chaired by the Prime Minister with the Deputy Prime Minister as deputy chair and includes the Attorney-General, the Minister for Foreign Affairs, the Minister for Defence, the Treasurer, the Minister for Immigration and Citizenship, and the Cabinet Secretary.

The Expenditure Review Committee (ERC) considers matters regarding expenditure and revenue of the Australian federal budget and the Mid-Year Economic and Fiscal Outlook. Decisions of the ERC must be endorsed by the Cabinet. The ERC is chaired by the Prime Minister with the Treasurer as deputy chair and includes the Deputy Prime Minister, the Minister for Foreign Affairs, the Minister for Health and Ageing, the Minister for Finance, the Deputy Prime Minister, the Minister for Infrastructure, Transport, Regional Development and Local Government, the Minister for Employment and Workplace Relations, and the Assistant Treasurer.

The Parliamentary Business Committee (PBC) considers priorities for the Australian Government's legislative program and requests to the Prime Minister for the presentation of ministerial statements. Decisions of the PBC do not require the endorsement of the Cabinet. The PBC is chaired by the Leader of the House with the Leader of the Government in the Senate as deputy chair and includes Manager of Government Business in the Senate, the Deputy Leader of the House, the Attorney-General, and the Assistant Minister to the Prime Minister (currently Patrick Gorman).

The other committees are the Government Communications Committee, the National Security Committee, the National Security Investment SubCommittee and the Priority and Delivery Committee.

=== Title ===
All members of the Cabinet are styled The Honourable.

== Current Cabinet ==
Party	Faction	Minister	Portrait	Offices
Labor	Left	Anthony Albanese (born 1963) MP for Grayndler (NSW) (1996–)		Prime Minister; Leader of the Labor Party
Labor	Right	Richard Marles (born 1967) MP for Corio (Vic.) (2007–)		Deputy Prime Minister; Deputy Leader of the Labor Party; Minister for Defence
Labor	Left	Penny Wong (born 1968) Senator for South Australia (2002–)		Minister for Foreign Affairs; Leader of the Government in the Senate
Labor	Right	Dr Jim Chalmers (born 1978) MP for Rankin (Qld.) (2013–)		Treasurer
Labor	Left	Katy Gallagher (born 1970) Senator for the Australian Capital Territory (2019–)		Minister for Finance; Minister for the Public Service; Minister for Women; Minister for Government Services; Vice-President of the Executive Council; Manager of Government Business in the Senate
Labor	Right	Don Farrell (born 1954) Senator for South Australia (2016–)		Minister for Trade and Tourism; Special Minister of State; Deputy Leader of the Government in the Senate
Labor	Right	Tony Burke (born 1969) MP for Watson (NSW) (2004–)		Minister for Home Affairs; Minister for Immigration and Citizenship; Minister for Cyber Security; Minister for the Arts; Leader of the House
Labor	Left	Mark Butler (born 1970) MP for Hindmarsh (SA) (2019–)		Minister for Health and Ageing; Minister for Disability and the National Disability Insurance Scheme; Deputy Leader of the House
Labor	Right	Chris Bowen (born 1973) MP for McMahon (NSW) (2010–)		Minister for Climate Change and Energy
Labor	Left	Catherine King (born 1966) MP for Ballarat (Vic.) (2001–)		Minister for Infrastructure, Transport, Regional Development and Local Government
Labor	Right	Amanda Rishworth (born 1978) MP for Kingston (SA) (2007–)		Minister for Employment and Workplace Relations
Labor	Right	Jason Clare (born 1972) MP for Blaxland (NSW) (2007–)		Minister for Education
Labor	Right	Michelle Rowland (born 1971) MP for Greenway (NSW) (2010–)		Attorney-General
Labor	Left	Tanya Plibersek (born 1969) MP for Sydney (NSW) (1998–)		Minister for Social Services
Labor	Left	Julie Collins (born 1971) MP for Franklin (Tas.) (2007–)		Minister for Agriculture, Fisheries and Forestry
Labor	Right	Clare O'Neil (born 1980) MP for Hotham (Vic.) (2013–)		Minister for Housing; Minister for Homelessness; Minister for Cities
Labor	Right	Madeleine King (born 1973) MP for Brand (WA) (2016–)		Minister for Resources; Minister for Northern Australia
Labor	Left	Murray Watt (born 1973) Senator for Queensland (2016–)		Minister for the Environment and Water
Labor	Left	Malarndirri McCarthy (born 1970) Senator for Northern Territory (2016–)		Minister for Indigenous Australians
Labor	Right	Anika Wells (born 1985) MP for Lilley (Qld.) (2019–)		Minister for Communications; Minister for Sport
Labor	Left	Pat Conroy (born 1979) MP for Shortland (NSW) (2016–)		Minister for Defence Industry; Minister for Pacific Island Affairs
Labor	Left	Anne Aly (born 1967) MP for Cowan (WA) (2016–)		Minister for Small Business; Minister for International Development; Minister for Multicultural Affairs
Labor	Left	Tim Ayres (born 1973) Senator for New South Wales (2019–)		Minister for Industry and Innovation; Minister for Science

== Shadow cabinet ==
Led by the leader of the Opposition, the Opposition in parliament appoints from its ranks a shadow cabinet to monitor government ministers and present itself as an alternative government. The portfolios of shadow ministers usually correspond with those of the government. When the Liberal and National parties are in Opposition, the shadow cabinet is appointed by the leader of the Opposition in consultation with the leader of the Nationals. When Labor has been in Opposition, the caucus has elected the shadow ministry and the leader has allocated portfolios. Smaller non-government parties often appoint spokespersons for Cabinet portfolios, but these are not referred to as a shadow cabinet.

== See also ==
- Albanese ministry
- List of female cabinet ministers of Australia
