= 1864 in Australian literature =

This article presents a list of the historical events and publications of Australian literature during 1864.

== Events ==
- The Australasian newspaper publishes its first issue on 1 October. It would continue publishing under this name until 6 April 1946.

== Books ==
- Louisa Atkinson – Myra
- Henry Newton Goodrich – Raven Rockstrow or, The Pedlar's Dream : A Romance of Melbourne
- Catherine Helen Spence – Mr Hogarth's Will (aka Uphill Work)
- Eliza Winstanley – Twenty Straws

== Short stories ==
- J. R. Houlding
  - "Don't Forget Your Poor Old Mother"
  - "Mr. Phiggs and His Christmas Breakfast"

== Poetry ==
- Adam Lindsay Gordon
  - "The Feud"
  - "Verses Inspired by my "Old Black Pipe""
- Henry Kendall
  - "Faith in God"
  - "Ghost Glen"
  - "The Last of His Tribe"
- J. Sheridan Moore – Spring-Life Lyrics
- Charles Thatcher – Thatcher's Colonial Minstrel : New Collection of Songs

== Births ==
A list, ordered by date of birth (and, if the date is either unspecified or repeated, ordered alphabetically by surname) of births in 1864 of Australian literary figures, authors of written works or literature-related individuals follows, including year of death.

- 23 January – Constance Le Plastrier, writer, schoolteacher and botanist (died 1938)
- 17 February – Banjo Paterson, poet and writer (died 1941)
- 23 August – Agnes L. Storrie, poet and writer (died 1936)
- 11 October — C. H. Souter, poet (died 1944)
- 30 November – Sydney Jephcott, poet (died 1951)
- 9 December – Breaker Morant, poet and soldier (died 1902)

Unknown date

- Laura Palmer-Archer, short story writer, wrote as Bushwoman (died 1929)

== Deaths ==
A list, ordered by date of death (and, if the date is either unspecified or repeated, ordered alphabetically by surname) of deaths in 1864 of Australian literary figures, authors of written works or literature-related individuals follows, including year of birth.

- 20 August — John Lang, novelist (born 1816)

== See also ==
- 1864 in Australia
- 1864 in literature
- 1864 in poetry
- List of years in Australian literature
- List of years in literature
