= Mr Hogarth's Will =

1864 novel by Catherine Helen Spence

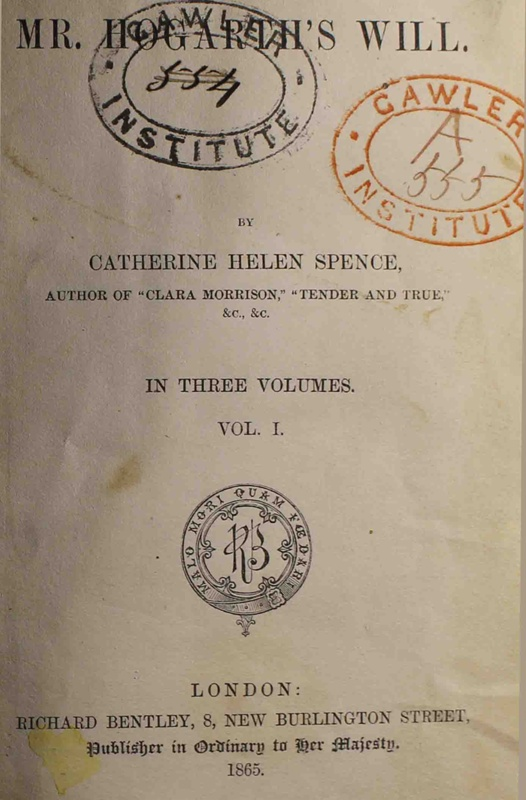
- Title page for Mr Hogarth's Will (1864)
- Author: Catherine Helen Spence
- Language: English
- Genre: Fiction
- Publication date: 1864
- Publication place: Australia
- Media type: Print
- Preceded by: Tender and True : A Colonial Tale
- Followed by: The Author's Daughter

Mr Hogarth's Will (1864) (aka Uphill Work) is a novel by Australian writer Catherine Helen Spence.

The novel was originally published in serial form in The Weekly Mail from February 1864.

== Synopsis ==
At the reading of the will of Mr Hogarth, a Scottish bachelor, it is discovered that he has not left his money to the two nieces he raised, but rather to a son that no-one had previously heard of. The two young women are forced, by the conditions of the will, to make their own way in the world, without any possible help from the son, even though he would like to provide it.

== Critical reception ==
In the chapter titled "Literature and Melodrama" in The Oxford Literary History of Australia, Robert Dixon writes of this novel, as with others of the author's, that "it is as if the mode of domestic realism resists the excesses of melodrama, holding it at a distance, both spatially and stylistically".

Emma on "The Australian Women's Writing Challenge" website notes: "Spence mixes a set of characters who have lived in Scotland all their lives and some who have lived in Scotland and in Australia. It allows her to compare the two ways of life and advertise life in the colonies. Through her characters, she discusses a lot of topics but I think that the most important point she’s making are that people should be judged according to their own value and accomplishments and not according to their birth...Mr Hogarth’s Will isn’t just about giving a forum to Spence’s ideas. It is also a wonderful Austenian novel with lovely characters. Jane and Elsie have something of Elinor and Marianne and of Jane and Elizabeth. Francis Hogarth could have been friends with Mr Knightley. There’s a Miss Philipps who could be Miss Bingley’s offspring. I had a soft spot for Mr Philipps, an affectionate man who gives a real shot at fatherhood and has quite a modern way to interact with his children. He seemed to be a better version of Mr Bennet."

On the ANZLitLovers blog Lisa Hill commented: "Mr Hogarth’s Will is not, despite its romantic entanglements and happy resolution, a soppy romance. The plot is absorbing over the full length of the book because the girls’ problems seem insurmountable and this novel is an early example of feminist realism in an entertaining package. Spence was on a mission to expose the structural problem of female unemployment and the poverty of single women."

== Publication history ==
After its original 1864 publication in The Weekly Mail, the novel was published as follows:

- Richard Bentley, UK, 1865
- Penguin Books, Australia, 1988

== See also ==
- 1864 in Australian literature
- The full text of this novel is available at Project Gutenberg Australia
