= Fiona Paisley =

Scottish-born Australian cultural historian

Fiona Paisley FASSA FAHA
- Born: Fiona Kerr Paisley; 1958 (age 67–68); Aberdeen, Scotland

Academic background
- Education: Monash University (BA, DipEd); University of Melbourne (MEd); La Trobe University (PhD)
- Thesis: Ideas have Wings: White Women Challenge Aboriginal Policy 1920–1937
- Doctoral advisor: Marilyn Lake

Academic work
- Discipline: History
- Sub-discipline: Women's history cultural history transnational history
- Institutions: Griffith University

Fiona Kerr Paisley FASSA FAHA (born 1958) is a Scottish-born Australian cultural historian at Griffith University. Her research and writing focuses on Australian Indigenous, feminist and transnational history.

Paisley was born in Aberdeen, Scotland in 1958. During her childhood she moved with her family between Scotland and Australia. She settled in Melbourne where she completed a BA and DipEd at Monash University and then worked as a high school teacher, before studying for a MEd at the University of Melbourne. She then undertook a PhD at La Trobe University, successfully submitting her thesis, "Ideas Have Wings: White Women Challenge Aboriginal Policy 1920-1937", which was supervised by Marilyn Lake.

== Honours and recognition ==
Paisley won the 2014 Magarey Medal for Biography for The Lone Protestor.

She was elected Fellow of the Academy of the Social Sciences in Australia in 2016, and of the Australian Academy of the Humanities in 2018.

== Selected works ==
- Paisley, Fiona (2000), Loving protection? : Australian feminism and Aboriginal women's rights, 1919-1939, Melbourne University Press, ISBN 978-0-522-84919-6
- Paisley, Fiona (2009), Glamour in the Pacific : cultural internationalism and race politics in the women's Pan-Pacific, University of Hawaii Press, ISBN 978-1-4416-2019-4
- Paisley, Fiona (2012), The lone protestor : A M Fernando in Australia and Europe, Aboriginal Studies Press, ISBN 978-1-922059-05-5
- Paisley, Fiona; Reid, Kirsty, eds. (2014), Critical perspectives on colonialism : writing the empire from below, Routledge, ISBN 978-0-415-53738-4
- Haggis, Jane; Midgley, Clare; Allen, Margaret; Paisley, Fiona (2017). Cosmopolitan Lives on the Cusp of Empire: Interfaith, cross-cultural and transnational networks, 1860-1950. Cham, Switzerland: Palgrave Macmillan. ISBN 978-3-319-52748-2.
- Paisley, Fiona; Scully, Pamela (19 September 2019), Writing transnational history, Bloomsbury Academic, Bloomsbury Publishing Plc (published 2019), ISBN 978-1-4742-6398-6
