= 1897 Australasian Federal Convention election =

The Australasian Federal Conventions elections were held on 4 and 6 March 1897 in New South Wales, Victoria, South Australia and Tasmania for the purpose of choosing ten representatives from each colony to constitute the Australasian Federal Convention, a key milestone in the Federation of Australia. The election of delegates to such a convention was almost entirely without historical precedent, but the method of electing representatives was criticised at the time, and later, as not well serving of democratic principles.

== Background ==
In January 1895 a meeting of the premiers of New South Wales, Victoria, Queensland, South Australia, Western Australia and Tasmania approved a scheme, devised by John Quick and adopted by George Reid, to directly elect the members of a convention which would be tasked to draft for the six colonies a federal constitution. Western Australia later decided its delegates would be MPs chosen by parliament, and the Queensland legislature could not settle on how to choose delegates, but the other four colonies went ahead with elections according to the Quick scheme.

== Electoral system ==
The Enabling Acts, which the four colonies passed to regulate the election of their convention representatives, conferred the right to vote on anyone entitled to vote in their lower houses of parliament: all male British subjects over 21 years of age in New South Wales, Victoria and Tasmania, and all British subjects over 21 in South Australia. The right to nominate as a candidate was similarly defined, except in Victoria where a hefty £50 deposit was also required, with the upshot that there only 32 candidates nominated, compared to 32 in both Tasmania and South Australia, and 49 in New South Wales.

Each colony voted as a single electorate; there was no division of any into geographical constituencies. All four colonies used the same voting method to decide the ten successful candidates, known then as scrutin de liste, block voting, or general ticket voting. Each voter indicated on the ballot the ten candidates they favoured, and the total of such indications (or "votes") for each candidate was then computed. The ten candidates with the ten largest totals filled the vacancies.

=== Objections ===
Contemporary critics of general ticket method of electing the Convention focused on the fact that it gave no recognition of the voter's ranking of the ten candidates which the voter selected; 'We gave as much weight', Spence observed, "for the tenth man for whom we did not care, as for the first for whom we did". T.R. Ashworth, leader of the Victorian section of the Australian Free Trade and Liberal Association, reinforced this critique by noting that the fact that a voter could not validly select fewer than ten candidates could produce a perverse result: "supporters of the defeated candidates voted for some on the successful list who defeated their own favourites".

Curiously, there was less contemporary objection to the commonplace violation by general ticket voting of the democratic sentiment that the successful candidates in any multi-candidate election should approximately reflect the range of opinion amongst voters. Experience has shown general ticket voting can grossly over-reward the largest single segment of opinion in the electorate, and a simple example of 100 voters deciding 10 vacancies brings this out: if 51 voters select candidates A through J, and the remaining 49 voters select candidates K through T, then the "position type" of the 51 voters wins all ten vacancies. The operation of this phenomenon was evident enough in Victoria in 1897. Thus the candidates sponsored by both the Age and the Trades Hall won only 41 per cent of the votes, but 70 percent of the vacancies. Correspondingly, the candidates sponsored by the Argus, but not by the Age, won 24.7 percent of the vote, but none of the vacancies. Similar results occurred in South Australia and New South Wales.

== Campaign ==
The campaigns were brief, there being less than two weeks, in South Australia for example, between the close of nominations and the elections. Candidates ran as individuals, and only loosely co-operated with one another. But newspapers, pressure groups, and the nascent Labor party (or Trades Hall) promoted 'lists', 'bunches' or 'tickets' of the ten candidates they favoured. These tended to reflect political divisions of the day. In Victoria the most prominent sponsors of such tickets were the protectionist Age, the free-trade Argus, and the Trades Hall. In South Australia the most prominent were the Liberal Union (protectionist), the Australian National League (free trade inclined) and Labor. In New South Wales Labor also ran a ticket, but the most influential tickets were United Protestant (organised by Church of England and Methodist clergy), and Orange (organised by the Loyal Orange Lodge). These tickets were precipitated by the candidacy of Cardinal Francis Moran, the Catholic Bishop of Sydney, who insisted he was standing only in an individual capacity, but who, declaimed the Rev. George McInnes, was "no true citizen of this country, no true subject of Her Majesty".

Tickets appear to have been distinctly influential, except in Tasmania where 'tickets', according to the press, 'as a rule were held cheap' .

== Results ==
=== Direct elections ===
The table records the votes of the forty successful candidates in the colonies where delegates were directly elected:

Votes received by successful candidates
New South Wales	votes	Victoria	votes	South Australia	votes	Tasmania	votes
Edmund Barton	98,540	George Turner	84,048	Charles Kingston	24,682	Philip Fysh	5,439
George Reid	84,678	John Quick	72,352	Frederick Holder	24,320	Edward Braddon	5,219
Joseph Carruthers	82,758	Alfred Deakin	62,654	John Cockburn	23,095	Henry Dobson	4,491
William McMillan	79 866	Alexander Peacock	61,941	Richard Baker	22,003	John Henry	4,264
William Lyne	75,402	Isaac Isaacs	56,981	John Gordon	21,958	Elliott Lewis	3,598
James Brunker	72,036	William Trenwith	55,693	Josiah Symon	21,281	Nicholas Brown	3,578
Richard O'Connor	69,217	Graham Berry	52,664	John Downer	20,426	Charles Grant	3,534
Joseph P. Abbott	60,691	Simon Fraser	49,886	Patrick Glynn	20,390	Adye Douglas	3,522
James T. Walker	54,248	William Zeal	48,119	James Howe	19,741	William Moore	3,399
Bernhard Wise	53,325	H. B. Higgins	44,105	Vaiben Louis Solomon	18,463	Matthew Clarke	3,300
Remaining candidates	667,959	Remaining candidates	402,643	Remaining candidates	197,498	Remaining candidates	36,071

=== Indirect elections ===
In Western Australia, a parliamentary vote was held on 13 March 1897 to elect delegates to the Convention, with Premier John Forrest stating it would be impractical and costly to hold a direct vote due to the colony's large size and remoteness of population centres. A total of 32 nominations were received, with one being disqualified for an irregular nomination and George Throssell withdrawing his nomination. There was no requirement for nominees to be members of parliament, but 21 of the 32 candidates were sitting MPs and another five were either former MPs or candidates at the 1897 general election.

Each member of the Legislative Assembly and Legislative Council was to select ten delegates. Of the 54 members of parliament, 47 voted in the election with one MP lodging an informal vote.

Candidate	Votes	Percentage
John Forrest	45	97.8%
James Lee Steere	43	93.5%
George Leake	40	87.0%
Frederick Piesse	38	82.6%
Winthrop Hackett	37	80.4%
William Loton	33	71.7%
Walter James	30	65.2%
Albert Hassell	27	58.7%
Robert Sholl	23	50.0%
John Howard Taylor	17	37.0%

Loton, Piesse, Sholl and Taylor resigned from the delegation after the Adelaide session of the Convention. A second parliamentary vote was held on 26 August 1897, with Harry Venn, Henry Briggs, Frederick Crowder and Andrew Henning elected as replacement delegates.

== Aftermath ==
H.B. Higgins, of the Age ticket, who won the tenth spot in Victoria, wrote to the eleventh-placed Henry Wrixon, of the Argus ticket, expressing his commiserations at Wrixon's failure. All successful candidates were duly sworn in at the first session of the Convention, which commenced proceedings on 22 March 1897.
