= Rupert Magarey =

Australian medical practitioner and surgeon

Sir Rupert Magarey FRCS (21 February 1914 – 1990) was an Australian medical practitioner and surgeon. He was a past president of the Australian Medical Association.

== Early life ==
The father of Susan Magarey, Sir Rupert Magarey was born James Rupert Magarey in Adelaide, South Australia, eldest son of Elsie (née Cowell) and Dr. Rupert Magarey, and attended Norwood Primary School and later St Peter's College, Adelaide. He graduated MB. BS. from the University of Adelaide in 1938.

== Army service ==
Magarey served in the Australian Imperial Forces during World War II, serving in the 7th Division in 1940. At the end of 1940 he sailed for the Middle East and Syria, where he served in the 2/11 Australian Army General Hospital. In recognition of his distinguished services he was mentioned in dispatches. After Japan entered the war Major Magarey's unit was recalled to Australia and later transferred to New Guinea and the Kokoda Trail as part of the 2/6 Australian Field Ambulance, serving as Senior Medical Officer at Alola on the Kokoda Trail.

== Professional career ==
Returning to Adelaide, South Australia after World War II Dr Magarey resumed his general practice in medicine. He was a General Surgeon and member of the Honorary Staff of the Royal Adelaide Hospital. Dr Magarey went to England to obtain his FRCS (Fellow of the Royal College of Surgeons) in 1949. He returned to Adelaide and passed the FRACS in 1950 and Master of Surgery in 1951 from University of Adelaide.
