= John Uhr =

Professor of political science in Australia

John Uhr is a Professor of Political Science in the School of Politics and International Relations at the Australian National University.

== Education ==
Uhr has an undergraduate degree (1972) from the University of Queensland, and graduate degrees (1974, 1979) from the University of Toronto, Canada.

== Career ==
Having graduated with his doctorate in 1979, Uhr joined the Commonwealth Parliamentary Library as the 1980-81 Parliamentary Fellow.

In 1990, Uhr joined the Australian National University as a lecturer in the Graduate School of Public Policy. In 2007, he was appointed Director of the Policy and Governance Program at the Crawford School of Public Policy, Australian National University.

As of 2016, Uhr lectures in latter-year politics courses on political theory, 'Ideas in Australian Politics' and conceptions of 'Justice'. Uhr also supervises PhD students in the areas of Australian politics, parliamentary studies and government ethics.

As the inaugural director for the Centre for the Study of Australian Politics at the ANU, Uhr is a point of contact for a broad network of academics studying Australian politics.

== Media ==
Uhr's public profile as a senior member of Australia's top Political Science department, the School of Politics at the Australian National University, leads to his comments frequently being reported in popular media.

== Published works ==
- John Uhr with David Headon, Eureka: Australia's Greatest Story (Sydney: The Federation Press, 2015)
- John Uhr, Terms of Trust: Arguments over ethics in Australian governments (Sydney: University of New South Wales Press, 2005)
- John Uhr, The Australian Republic: The Case for Yes (Sydney: The Federation Press, 1999)
- John Uhr, Deliberative Democracy in Australia: The Changing Place of Parliament (Cambridge: Cambridge University Press, 1998)
- John Uhr (ed.), Ethical Practice in Government: Improving Organisational Management (Canberra: Federalism Research Centre, 1996)
- John Uhr, Program Evaluation: Decision Making in Australian Government (Canberra: Federalism Research Centre, 1991)
