= Susan Magarey =

Australian historian

- Born: Susan Margaret Magarey; 23 April 1943 (age 83); Brisbane, Queensland
- Education: University of Adelaide (B.A., Dip.Ed.); Australian National University (M.A., and PhD)
- Occupations: Historian and author
- Spouse: Christopher Eade (1966–1978)
- Parent(s): James Rupert Magarey; Catherine Mary Gilbert

Susan Margaret Magarey (born 23 April 1943) AM, FASSA, is an Australian historian and author, most notable for her historic works and biographies of Australian women.

== Family ==
The daughter of James Rupert Magarey (1914–1990), later Sir Rupert Magarey, and Catherine Mary Magarey (1918–1989), née Gilbert, Susan Margaret Magarey was born in Brisbane on 23 April 1943.

The first of four children, she has one brother, James (1946–), and two sisters, Catherine (1948–1972), and Mary Elizabeth (1952–).

She married John Christopher Eade in 1966; they divorced in 1977.

== Education ==
External videos
- Susan Magarey's contribution to "Work or marriage? Dilemmas for women 1960s", in the series The Making of Modern Australia (ABC Education)

Educated at Wilderness School in Adelaide – she was head prefect in 1960 – she attended both the University of Adelaide and the Australian National University (ANU). There, studying history, English literature, and education, Magarey attained the following:

- B.A.(Hons) – Adelaide (1964)
- Dip.Ed. – Adelaide (1965)
- M.A. – ANU (1972)
- PhD – ANU (1976)

== Career ==
1985–now	Founding editor of the international journal Australian Feminist Studies (Routledge)
1985–2002	Director of the Research Centre for Women's Studies at the University of Adelaide
2002–now	Professor Emerita in History at the University of Adelaide

== Honours and awards ==
- 2006 – Member of the Order of Australia
- 2005 – Fellow of the Academy of the Social Sciences in Australia
- 1986 – Walter McRae Russell Award for Unbridling the Tongues of Women, first published 1985

== Magarey Medal for biography ==
The Magarey Medal for biography is a biennial prize with a substantial award. The prize is awarded to the female author who has published the work judged to be the best biographical writing on an Australian subject in the preceding two years. The prize is donated by Susan Magarey.

Prize winners have been:

- 2004 – Heather Goodall and Isabel Flick, Isabel Flick: the Many Lives of an Extraordinary Aboriginal Woman, Allen and Unwin
- 2006 – Prue Torney-Parlicki, Behind the News: a Biography of Peter Russo, UWA Press
- 2008 – Sylvia Martin, Ida Leeson: a Life, Allen and Unwin
- 2010 – Jill Roe, Stella Miles Franklin: a Biography, Fourth Estate
- 2012 – Sheila Fitzpatrick, My Father's Daughter: Memories of an Australian Childhood, Melbourne University Press
- 2014 – Fiona Paisley, The Lone Protestor: AM Fernando in Australia and Europe, Aboriginal Studies Press
- 2016 – Libby Connors, Warrior: A Legendary Leader's Dramatic Life and Violent Death on the Colonial Frontier, Allen and Unwin
- 2018 – Alexis Wright, Tracker, Giramondo
- 2020 – Helen Ennis, Olive Cotton: A Life in Photography, 4th Estate
- 2022 – Bernadette Brennan, Leaping into Waterfalls: The enigmatic Gillian Mears, Allen and Unwin
- 2024 – Ann-Marie Priest, My Tongue Is My Own: A life of Gwen Harwood, La Trobe University Press
- 2026 – Susan Wyndham, Elizabeth Harrower: The Woman in the Watch Tower, NewSouth

== Bibliography ==
=== Dissertations ===
- Eade, Susan Margaret (1971). A Study of Catherine Helen Spence, 1825–1910 (M.A. thesis). Australian National University.
- Eade, Susan Margaret (November 1975). The Reclaimers: A Study of the Reformatory Movement in England and Wales, 1846–1893 (PDF) (PhD thesis). Australian National University. OCLC 222119517.

=== Books ===
- Magarey, Susan (1985). Unbridling the tongues of women : a biography of Catherine Helen Spence. Sydney: Hale & Iremonger.
  - — (2010) [1985]. Unbridling the tongues of women : a biography of Catherine Helen Spence. Adelaide: University of Adelaide Press.
  - — (2010) [1985]. Unbridling the tongues of women : a biography of Catherine Helen Spence (PDF). [Digital version]. Adelaide: University of Adelaide Press.
- Susan Magarey and Lyndall Ryan (1990) Bibliography of Australian women's history
- Susan Magarey, Passions of the first wave feminists (UNSW Press), Kensington, 2001.
- Susan Magarey (ed.) with Barbara Wall, Mary Lyons and Maryan Beams, Ever Yours, C.H. Spence: Catherine Helen Spence's An Autobiography (1825–1910), Diary (1894) and Some Correspondence (1894–1910), (Wakefield Press), Adelaide, 2005.
- Susan Magarey, ed. (2006). Ever Yours, C. H. Spence. Wakefield Press. ISBN 1-86254-656-8.
- Susan Magarey and Kerrie Round (2007, 2009) Roma the First: a Biography of Dame Roma Mitchell Wakefield Press, Adelaide
- Susan Magarey (2009) Looking Backward: Looking Forward. A History of the Queen Adelaide Club 1909–2009 Queen Adelaide Club, 2009
- Dangerous Ideas: Women's Liberation, Women's Studies, Around the World (2015) University of Adelaide Press.

=== Articles and book chapters ===
- Susan Eade, 'Social History in Britain in 1976: A Survey', Labour History, No.31, (November 1976), pp. 38–52. doi=10.2307/27508236
- Susan Eade, 'Now We Are Six: A Plea for Women's Liberation', Refractory Girl, Nos.13–14, (March 1977), pp. 3–11.
- Susan Magarey, 'Feminist Visions across the Pacific: Catherine Helen Spence's Handfasted', Antipodes: A North American Journal of Australian Literature, vol.3, no.1, Spring 1989.
- Susan Magarey, 'Sex vs Citizenship: Votes for Women in South Australia', Journal of the Historical Society of South Australia, no.21, 1993.
- Susan Magarey, 'Catherine Helen Spence', Constitutional Centenary: The Newsletter of the Constitutional Centenary Foundation Inc., vol.2, no.2, May 1993.
- Susan Magarey, 'Why Didn't They Want to be Members of Parliament? Suffragists in South Australia', in Caroline Daley and Melanie Nolan (eds), Suffrage and Beyond: International Feminist Perspectives, (Auckland University Press/Pluto Press Australia), Auckland/Annandale, 1994.
- Susan Magarey, 'Catherine Helen Spence – Novelist' in Philip Butterss (ed.), Southwords: Essays on South Australian Writing (Wakefield Press), Kent Town, 1995.
- Susan Magarey, 'Catherine Helen Spence and the Federal Convention', The New Federalist: The Journal of Australian Federation History, no.1, June 1998.
- Susan Magarey, 'Spence, Catherine Helen (1825–1910)' in Helen Irving (ed.), The Centenary Companion to Australian Federation (Cambridge University Press) Oakleigh, 1999.
- Susan Magarey, 'Secrets and Revelations: A Newly Discovered Diary', Bibliofile, vol.11, no.2, August 2004.
- Susan Magarey, 'Catherine Helen Spence (1825–1910' in J.E. King (ed.), A Biographical Dictionary of Australian and New Zealand Economists (Edward Elgar), Cheltenham/Northampton, 2007.
- 'What is Happening to Women's History in Australia at the Beginning of the Third Millennium?', Women's History Review, Vol.16, No.1, February 2007;
- 'Dreams and Desires: four 1970s Feminist Visions of Utopia', Australian Feminist Studies, Vol.22, No. 53, July 2007;
- 'Dame Roma Mitchell's Unmentionables: Sex, Politics and Religion', the Fourth History Council of South Australia Lecture, 2007, in History Australia, 2008;
- When it changed: the beginnings of Women's Liberation in Australia in David Roberts and Martin Crotty (eds), Turning Points in Australian History (UNSW Press) Sydney, 2008;
- Three Questions for Biographers: Public or Private? Individual or Society? Truth or Beauty?, Journal of Historical Biography (Canada), no.4, Autumn 2008;
- The Sexual Revolution as Big Flop, in Academy of the Social Sciences in Australia (ed.), Dialogue, vol.27, no.3, 2008;
- 'The invention of juvenile delinquency in early nineteenth century England', first pub. Labour History, 1978, republished in John Muncie and Barry Goldson (eds), Youth Crime and Juvenile Justice, 3 vols (Sage Publications), London 2008.
- The private life of Catherine Helen Spence 1825–1910 in Graeme Davison, Pat Jalland and Wilfrid Prest (eds), Body and Mind in Modern British and Australian History: Essays in Honour of FB Smith (Melbourne University Publishing), Melbourne, 2009.
- '"To Demand Equality Is To Lack Ambition": Sex Discrimination legislation: contexts and contradictions', Conference held at the Australian National University to mark the Silver anniversary of the Sex Discrimination Act 1984, October 2009, now published in Margaret Thornton (ed.), Sex Discrimination in Uncertain Times (ANU E Press) Canberra, 2010.
- Susan Magarey, 'Catherine Helen Spence's Journalism: Some Social Aspects of South Australian Life, By A Colonist of 1839 – C.H. Spence' in Margaret Anderson, Kate Walsh and Bernard Whimpress (eds), Adelaide Snapshots 1850–1875 (Wakefield Press), Kent Town, 2010, forthcoming.

=== Book reviews ===
- Eade, Susan (9 December 1972). "Horne from whoa to go". The Canberra Times. Vol. 47, no. 13302. Australian Capital Territory, Australia. p. 10 – via National Library of Australia.
- Magarey, Susan, "The Bolter", [Review of Ann Moyal's A Woman of Influence: Science, Men and History. UWA Publishing]. Australian Book Review, volume 364, (September 2014), p. 40.
