= Gordon Tidy =

British journalist and minister

- Born: 7 January 1862; London, England
- Died: 30 April 1953 (aged 91); Pontesbury, Shropshire
- Occupations: Soldier, jackaroo, educator, journalist, religious minister

Gordon Tidy (7 January 1862 – 30 April 1953) (Note: In 1912 Tidy stated as a reason for returning from attempting the Catholic priesthood that he was 54, making his date of birth c. 1858 (Forbes Times, 1 May 1912). Registration documents and a 1939 census indicate he was born in 1862.) was a journalist in Australia before returning to England as a minister of religion, among other occupations. His friendships included with poets Will H. Ogilvie (1869–1963), A. B. 'Banjo' Paterson (1864–1941), Arthur Bayldon (1865–1958), Henry Lawson (1867–1922), and war historian Charles E. W. Bean (1879–1968).

== Personal life ==
Born in London, Tidy was the son of Major-General Thomas Holmes Tidy (c. 1808–1874), later assistant-Adjutant General of the Horse Guards, and Catharine Maister. Thomas Tidy was the son of Colonel Francis Skelly Tidy (1775–1835). Frank Tidy was the son of Reverend Thomas Holmes Tidy (1766–), chaplain to His Majesty's 26th regiment of foot, and later rector of Redmarshall, County Durham, England, and Henrietta Augusta Skelly (1766–).

In 1871, aged 9, with a brother, Tidy was living with his parents at Thorpe Hall, Wycliffe with Thorpe, Yorkshire. He was later educated at Wellington College, Berkshire, England.

== Military service ==
After an education at the Royal Military College, Sandhurst, Tidy rose to the rank of lieutenant of the 8th King's Regiment. Serving at Meerut, India in the 1880s, he once observed Robert Baden-Powell, the adjutant of the 13th Hussars, to be an excellent mimic and a leadership example.

Tidy left the military as it was indicated he 'found the financial pace too hot, and abandoned the profession of Blood, after a while'. Close friend Scottish-Australian poet and bush balladeer Will H. Ogilvie on the other hand indicated it was because Tidy 'could not ride!'

== Australia ==
From military life, Tidy went to sea, arriving in Australia and took up jackarooing. It was at Maaoupe station, near Penola, South Australia, and later at Nelungaloo station, near Parkes, New South Wales, that he served as tutor to the children of the station managers and owners. Tidy met his life-long friend Ogilvie at Maaoupe, and together with Ogilvie, they formed a friendship with Harry 'Breaker' Morant (1864–1902) at Nelungaloo. He would later write Morant's obituary following the Second Anglo-Boer War court-marshal.

Trout fishing was one interest of Tidy, and likely contributed to his penning of two later books.

=== Journalism ===
Tidy moved from station life to editor of Parkes' Western Champion newspaper. He was a contributor to The Bulletin, and also wrote under the pen name 'Mousquetaire'. More than once, Ogilvie and Morant would be up late with Tidy helping produce the Monday edition of the Champion.

== Religious minister ==
Finishing with Condobolin's newspaper, the Argus, following in the calling of his grandfather, in January 1898 Tidy became a catechist with the Church of England in the Nymagee district.

Tidy administered with noted scholastic sermons both in Australia and England, whilst also temporarily converting to the Catholic Church.

- 1898 (June) – Church of England, Forbes, New South Wales, as curate;
- 1903 – Kelso, as curate. Tidy was ordained on 20 September 1903;
- 1904 (September) – Ordained to full orders by Bishop Camidge of Bathurst. He took up a position at Narromine;
- 1906 – At Molong Tidy was considered to be 'a plain spoken preacher without any trimmings, who gets on the spot all the time';
- 1906 – All Saints' Anglican Cathedral, Bathurst while Dean Marriott was on a leave of absence in England;
- 1909–1911 – Saint James' Anglican Cathedral, King Street, Sydney, as assistant to Reverend Carr Smith;
- 1911 (February) – Received into the Catholic Church, at Saint Stanislaus' College, Bathurst, before going to the Saint Columbus College, Springwood. After travelling to Rome, identifying it was going to take five years to qualify as a priest, and being 54-years-of-age, Tidy reviewed his situation;
- 1912 (May) – Reinstatement into the Anglican church;
- 1912 (August) – Dymock, Diocese of Gloucester, England as assistant priest;
- 1917 – Ditteridge, Wiltshire, as rector;
- 1923 – Middleton, Chirbury, Shropshire; and
- 1923–1936 – Stanton St Quintin, near Chippenham, Wiltshire, as rector. In 1927, he was also in charge of the Hullavington parish.

By 1939, Tidy had retired to Atcham, Shropshire.

== Death ==
Tidy died on 30 April 1953, Pontesbury, Shropshire, aged 91, as the last surviving son of his parents. He is buried in nearby Saint Lucia churchyard, Upton Magna.

== Works ==
=== Poems ===
Some of Tidy's known poems include:

- 'Tennyson's life' (1898). More than once Tidy made reference to the poet Alfred, Lord Tennyson.
- 'Fair girls and grey horses' (1898), a response to close friend Ogilvie's just-released 'Fair girls and gray horses' inaugural anthology.
- 'A bush (contingent) ballad' (1900).
- 'Mafeking' (1900).
- 'Four friends' (1902), referring to fellow Australian poets Gordon, Ogilvie, Lawson, and Paterson. The poem was published under Tidy's pen name 'Mousquetaire' in The Bulletin, 14 June 1902.
- 'Across the black soil plains' (1902). The poem was based on George Washington Lambert's painting 'Across the black soil plains' of a horse team dragging a laden wool-waggon. His words have been compared to but not as powerful as Ogilvie's 'How the Fire Queen crossed the swamp'. The poem was published under Tidy's pen name 'Mousquetaire' in The Bulletin, 30 October 1902.
- 'Horace in Australia' (1911).
- 'From an old inhabitant' (1915), relating to the Forbes District.
- 'A rhyme of good advice' (1923), a response to Ogilvie's new anthology Galloping shoes.

=== Books ===
- Surtees on fishing (1931), 63 pages, limited edition of 500 copies, published by Constable & Co. Limited, London. Relates to sports writer Robert Smith Surtees (1805–1864).
- A little about Leech (1931), a monograph on sporting artist and caricaturist John Leech (1817–1864).

=== Contributions ===
- Prefatory note to the first illustrated version of Cardinal Newman's The Dream of Gerontius (1916).

== See also ==
- List of Australian poets
