= William Henry Ogilvie =

Scottish-Australian poet (1869–1963)

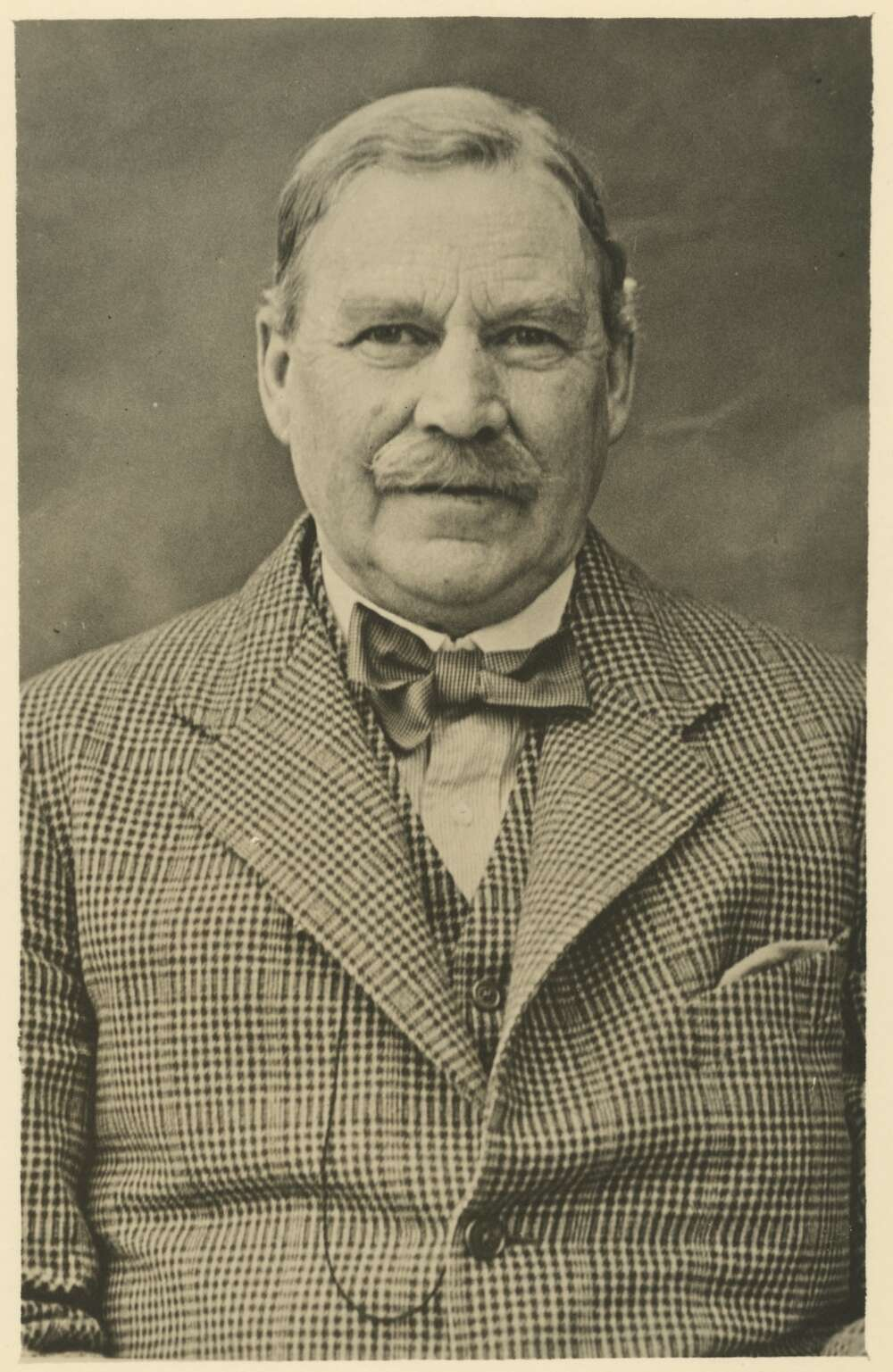
- Ogilvie, circa 1937
- Born: 21 August 1869; Kelso, Scotland
- Died: 30 January 1963 (aged 93); Ashkirk, Scotland
- Occupations: Poet, balladist
- Spouse: Katharine Margaret 'Madge' Scott Anderson (1879–1965)
- Children: Margaret Deloraine 'Wendy' Ogilvie (1909–2003); George Thomas Anderson Ogilvie (1912–1995)

Signature
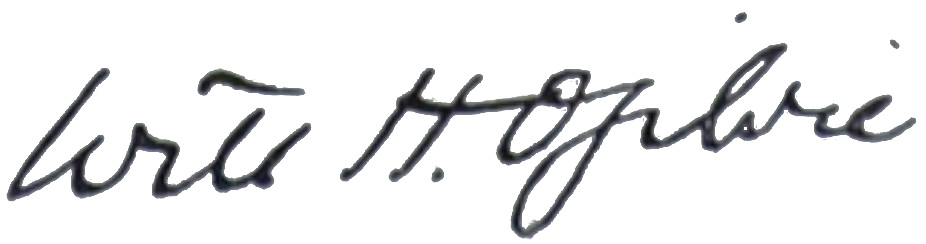

William Henry Ogilvie (21 August 1869 – 30 January 1963) was a Scottish-Australian narrative poet and horseman, jackaroo, and drover, and described as a quiet-spoken handsome Scot of medium height, with a fair moustache and red complexion. He was also known as Will Ogilvie, by the pen names including 'Glenrowan' and the lesser 'Swingle-Bar', and by his initials, WHO.

Ogilvie was part of the trio of Australian bush poets, with Banjo Paterson (1864–1941) and Henry Lawson (1867–1922). His Fair girls and gray horses (1896) was considered second only to Banjo Paterson's Man from Snowy River (1895). A reader ballot in 1914 saw him placing seventh of Australia's twelve most favourite poets. (Note: The 1914 Melbourne's Herald ballot ranked the top twelve of one hundred and ten favourite Australian poets as: 1st Adam Lindsay Gordon, Henry Kendall, Bernard O'Dowd, Victor Daley, Henry Lawson, Banjo Paterson, Will H. Ogilvie, James Brunton Stephens, Roderic Quinn, Mary Gilmore, George Essex Evans, E. J. Brady. (Barrier Miner newspaper, 29 July 1914, p. 6 (http://nla.gov.au/nla.news-article45290156)))

Wearing the title of 'Universally acclaimed in Australia as a bush balladist of the "Outback"', Will H. Ogilvie wrote over 1,100 poems, including A Scotch night, The Australian, Summer country, Kings of the earth, and Whaup o' the rede.

== Personal life ==
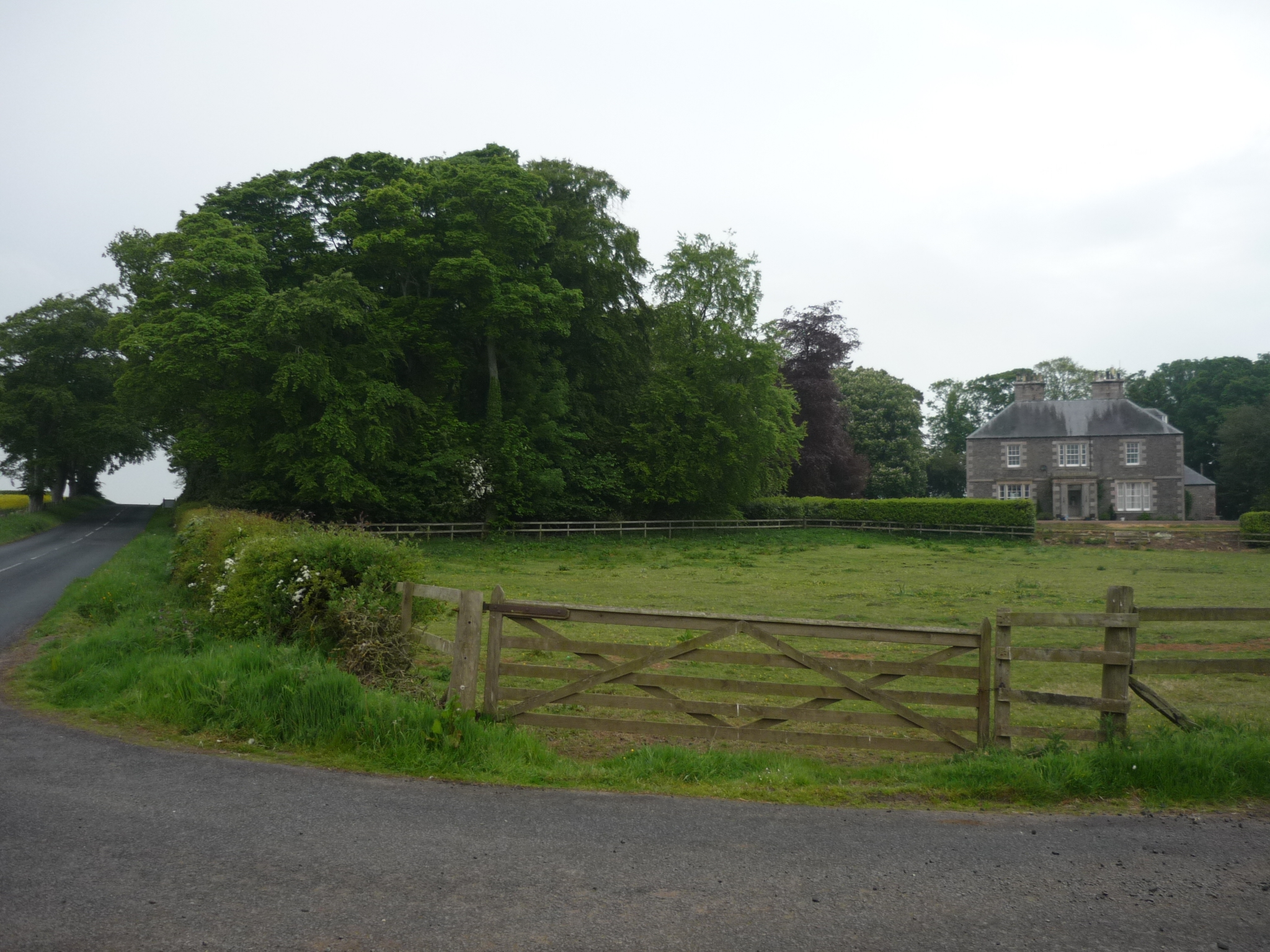
Holefield Farm, Lempitlaw, Kelso, beside the B6396

Ogilvie was born at Holefield, near Kelso, Borders, Scotland on 21 August 1869 to George Ogilvie and Agnes Christie, the second child of eight. George farmed the lands of the Earl of Dalkeith on the Buccleuch Estates. Agnes, an orphan of the Indian Mutiny at Cawnpore, was a gifted pianist. Of the eight children – Zoe (b. 1867), George (b. 1872), Winifred (b. 1873), Tom (b. 1875), Eric (b. 1876), Kate (b. 1879), and Gladys (b. 1884) – William was the only one to marry.

Ogilvie was educated at Kelso High School for two terms as a weekly boarder, had some tutoring in Yorkshire, before entering Fettes College, Edinburgh where he excelled as a runner and in rugby.

Having just turned twenty years of age, he travelled from Scotland to Australia on the SS Arcadia for four weeks, via the Suez Canal, arriving in Sydney on 1 November 1889. During his time in Australia he worked on sheep stations in north-western New South Wales, south-eastern South Australia, and central New South Wales, where he was a proficient horseman, and gained the reputation as one of Australia's top bush poets.

After eleven years on the continent, on 9 February 1901 aged thirty-one, in Sydney the poet and bushman boarded the SS Persic travelling by way of Cape Town to Liverpool, England. Ogilvie returned to Scotland to Edinburgh to become a freelance journalist. From 1905 to 1908, he held the position of professor of agricultural journalism at the Iowa State College, United States of America. American ranch life however held no attraction to that of Australian properties.

In 1908 he returned again to Scotland and married Katharine Margaret 'Madge' Scott Anderson (1879 – 25 June 1965), the daughter of Tom Scott Anderson and a descendant of Dr Alexander Anderson who participated in the last and fatal expedition of explorer Mungo Park. Will and Madge had two children, Margaret Deloraine 'Wendy' Ogilvie (1909–2003), and George Thomas Anderson Ogilvie (1912–1995), when living at 'Brundenlaws' in the village of Bowden.

Australia remained important to the poet, prizing a stockwhip made by Alexander Patton with a silver tacks spelling out 'W.H.O.' on the handle, and making a damper for visiting guests. (Note: The stockwhip is now in the possession of the Cobb & Co. Museum, Toowoomba, Australia.) Australia also remembered Ogilvie through continued correspondence over his later years, including school children wishing him a happy 70th birthday.

During World War I, Ogilvie remained in Great Britain, and was in charge of and prepared Canadian horses for military service at the Army Remounts Branch in Wiltshire, England. Fellow Australian poet A. B. 'Banjo' Paterson was placed with the Australian Remount Service in 1915, rising to become its officer in charge in Cairo, Egypt.

In 1918 he first leased then bought the Presbyterian church manse 'Kirklea' at Ashkirk, Selkirkshire, Scotland. At the start of World War II Ogilvie, aged 71, undertook ARP warden duties in Selkirk. He continued to live in Kirklea until his death at 93 years of age in 1963, followed by his wife Madge in 1965. His ashes were scattered on the hill road to Roberton, Scotland, along with Australian wattle leaves.

Ogilvie's son George wrote the biography entitled Balladist of Borders & Bush in 1994.

== Influences ==
The poet actively acknowledged the influences of Australian poet Adam Lindsay Gordon (1833–1870):

Our Lindsay Gordon! From the north-most cape
South to the Otway he is loved and known.
The boughs that shadow and the dusts that drape
His horse and horseman— are they not our own?
And every bronzed, burnt bushman in the east,
And every digger In the western mines,
From him has learned one lilting page at least,
And loved it for the heart between the lines.

He was given to be of the Whyte-Melville school, named after Scottish novelist and poet George John Whyte-Melville (1821–1878), which was evident in two poems of the same name in his works Galloping shoes (1922) and Scattered scarlet (1923).

Ogilvie wrote lyrical and romantic poetry noted for its balladic style, with expressive descriptions of Australian Outback life and characters. Will, as he was known, also wrote a great deal of work on English and Scottish themes and his work has been included in collections of English and Scottish poetry. All of his work was originally published in, and he is most closely associated with, Australia. Before being printed in books, many works in the newspapers were under the pen name of 'Glenrowan', and also 'Swingle-Bar'. It was suggested 'Glenrowan' was named for the town of Glenrowan, Victoria where he passed through on his way to Gunningbland station, near Parkes, New South Wales in 1894 as a roustabout. Ogilvie however had been using that pen name by April 1893. 'Swinglebar' is the name associated with a wooden bar between draught horses and a wagon that keeps the chains separate. He also wrote in Australia under the names of 'Free Lance' and 'Fourth Mate', and in Scotland with 'Freebooter'.

Events in Eastern Australia also brought 'the Lucky Country' an impact on the quality of life in the last decade of the 1800s:

- the 1891 Australian shearers' strike (with issues still persisting into 1894, even on Belalie, a property where Ogilvie worked),
- the Australian banking crisis of 1893 (where bank notes from collapsed banks became worthless), and
- the Federation Drought (from 1896 to 1902). Due to the droughts, properties such as Belalie underwent destocking in 1899.

Ogilvie captured the essence of droughts in his words, contained within The outlaw (To round the cattle on drafting-camps on drought-bound western runs), The pack horse (But drought had stolen my strength away), The team bullock (Grim Drought had bound the Western land), and particularly Back o' Bourke (That's where the fires of hell burn through).

At the time of 1898 each of Australia's balladeers wrote of a different phase of their own lives: 'Lawson the swagman, Dyson the miner, Daley the poet, Paterson the humorist... And now Ogilvie... the horseman'. In the same year, it was also suggested that Daley was 'Ogilvie's only living rival', but does not explain the absence of references to Lawson and Paterson.

His good friend Harry 'Breaker' Morant was said to write like Ogilvie, beginning 'to write prose and verse – mostly horse-verse and lovey-dovey rhymes'. Similarly some outside influences can be seen in some of Ogilvie's work: that of John Greenleaf Whittier in Memory town, Rudyard Kipling in Black sheep, and perhaps a little of Henry Lawson. Robert Burns, Robert Browning, James Hogg, and John Keats have all been ascribed. Within the poet's own A song of the poets, he also hints at Robert Bridges, Abercrombie, Davies, W. B. Yeats, Noyes, Watson, Henry Newbolt and John Masefield.

His love of the Australian Outback, dogs, and horses is well-reflected in his work (My Life in the Open, Kelpies, The Australian). The equestrian dedication was even subject of jibes:

For suffering days, weeks, and months, we've heard Adam Lindsay Gordon. 'Banjo' Paterson, Will Ogilvie, Harry Morant and others spoken, mouthed, recited, garroted and assassinated in the pursuit of verses dedicated to Horse!'

A collection of Will Ogilvie's poetry was published in Saddle for a throne (1952), 'Dedicated to comrades of camp-fire and muster'; the book contains a foreword by R. M. Williams, who met him in the late 1940s and who was instrumental in publishing the works. Cited as a 'triumvirate of renown – the horsemen poets', he held the pedestal with Adam Lindsay Gordon and R. B. Cunninghame Graham.

Ogilvie also wrote tributes about soldiers, including 'The Australian: The bravest thing God ever made!' (A British officer's opinion) which was set to music by 1918. During World War I, Ogilvie contributed verses for the London Punch magazine. In World War II, his poem The Australian was reprinted, the only article ever republished by the magazine (by 1970).

Women or 'fair girls' were also a recurring theme in Ogilvie's poems, including His Gippsland girl. Although his attitudes were said to be that of a courtly gentleman, and mindful of his love of horses, 'One might say that he showed no sign of deeper feeling for girls than for horses.'

Ogilvie was included as one of the worthy 'sun-browned muses' who wrote in rhythmic metre rather than 'free style' evident by the 1920s:

I claim that my old friends the Bush poets are the sort that the Empire needs – workers, sportsmen, fighters, good comrades—and as to the pale, long-haired writer of free verse, let us take him out and drown him!

He exercised his prerogative to both use the same title for different poems, and adjust existing poems.

- Adam Lindsay Gordon (poem)
  - 'Ah! sad, proud Gordon! Crossing swords with Care, And touching hands so many times with Death' (Hearts of gold, 1903).
  - 'Our Lindsay Gordon! From the north-most cape, South to the Otway he is loved and known.' (1919 newspaper)
  - 'Two things stand like stone,' he said— 'Courage and Kindness. Gallant Dead!' (Galloping shoes, 1922)
- Australia (poem)
  - 'I have gathered verse-gold from her glory, Spell-bound in her emerald chains; I have stolen her heart for a story' (1899 newspaper)
  - 'She has hidden each footprint of mine' (The collected sporting verse of Will H. Ogilvie, 1932)
  - 'Arrayed against the Triple Powers' (From sunset to dawn, 1946)

He occasionally assigned another title to an existing poem, such as The ploughman (in Hearts of gold (1903)) and The ploughman poet (1925, in an Australian newspaper).

By 1950 the poet was still warmly described as 'one of Australia's greatest and most loved poets', and 'one of the last of the great poets of the 1900 era'.

Ogilvie's work also went on to influence others, including 'a lifetime addiction' of his accounts by Australian architect Mary Turner Shaw (1906–1990), including his insights into stock movements in the Outback. Australian artist Hugh Sawrey (1919–1999) was also inspired by Paterson and Ogilvie, especially the affinity to horses and experiencing the droving life.

== Australian period ==
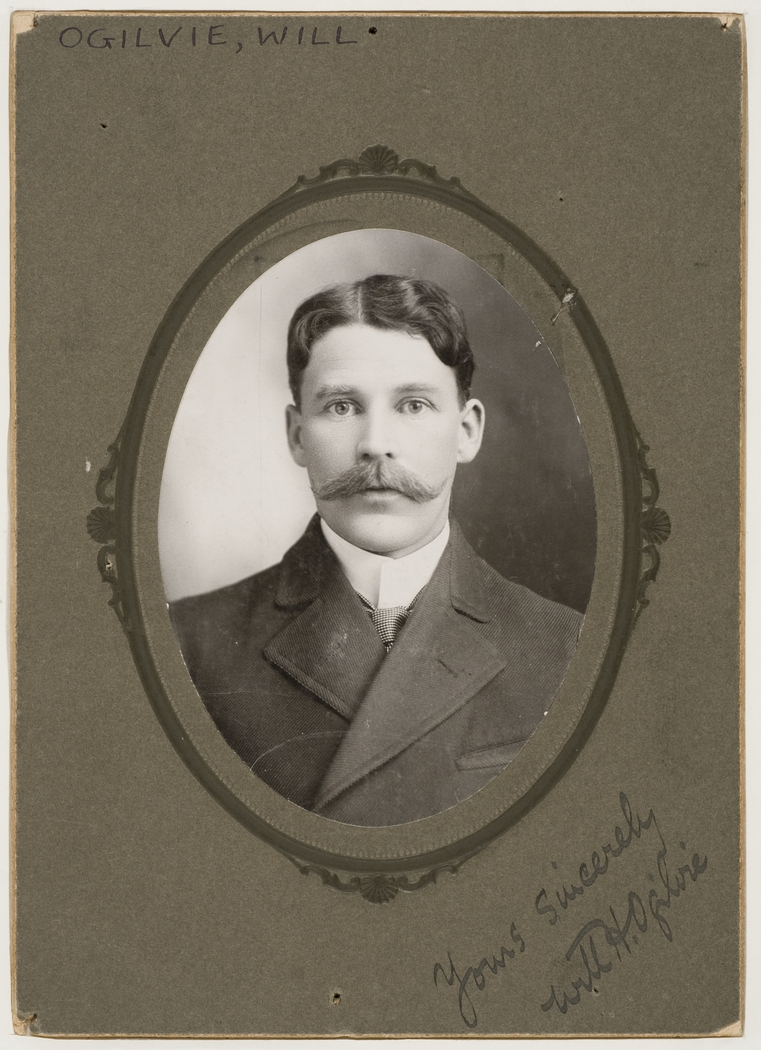
Will H. Ogilvie, believed circa 1890, aged about 20. Bearing subject's signature

After schooling, Ogilvie was sent to Australia in 1889 as a 'testing ground' by his father, returning to Scotland after a decade. He had a deep love of horses and riding and he became interested in the Outback. Setting out from Sydney in November 1890, before long he became an expert station hand, drover and horse breaker. Over his eleven years Ogilvie worked on several pastoral stations including:

- 'Belalie', north of the town of Enngonia on the Warrego River, north-west New South Wales, south of Barringun (from 1891, for 2.5 years);
- 'Maaoupe', north-west of Penola in south-east South Australia, as an overseer (1893);
- 'Gunningbland', near Parkes, New South Wales (1894);
- 'Nelungaloo', near Parkes, New South Wales;
- 'Genangie', at Peak Hill, Parkes/Forbes district of New South Wales; and
- 'Brindinyabba', near his first station of Belalie, between Enngonia, New South Wales, and Hungerford, Queensland (1900).

It was a letter of introduction to Robert Scott's family that directed him to Belalie, to help friends of the family. It was here he received the inspiration to pen Fair girls and gray horses, (Note: The original 1898 book spells 'gray' with an 'a' (including to the 1914 edition), while 'grey' was used by other persons and sources.) based on Robert Scott's daughter Lynette, (Note: The children of James SCOTT and Nancy SHIEL emigrated from Scotland's Border area to Australia. It cannot be established if there was a daughter called Lynette from either William (1845–1924) or Robert (1829–1859). A family property in Victoria was called 'Lempitlaw', which were the Scottish Borders property of writer Sir Walter SCOTT, Lord of Buccleuch. A link between the author and the Australian immigrants has not yet been drawn.) and a grey horse 'Loyal Heart' he bought from the local pound. The acclaimed poem was first penned on the stock route between Forbes and Bogan Gate in the NSW Parkes area before being refined on the walls of his bedroom at Maaoupe station. Separately later on it was identified the horse had been stolen from Australian outback pioneer Patsy Durack (1834–1898).

Nostalgically Ogilvie wrote Back to the border of his time at Belalie station:

But sling me a saddle on some good horse
Bred on Belalie or Lila Springs,
With the Warrego mud in his mane, of course,
And the grass-feed green on his snaffle rings.
Over Bourke bridge at the break of day
Let me north where the red tracks run,
And blindfold yet I could find my way
Through Enngonia to Barringun.

The thoughts were repeated in Comrades and After the horses, referring to Belalie's R-S-bar cattle brand.

After Belalie, Ogilvie travelled overland to Maaoupe station in South Australia prior to November 1893 and probably earlier as an overseer, which was owned by the family of Dr James Dickson and managed by Mr John McCouchie, one of them a cousin of William Scott. Many poems were submitted under the pen name 'Glenrowan' to the South Australian The Border Watch newspaper, including A draft from Tringadee, The dapple greys, Dark lamps, The filling of the swamps, How the chestnut horse came home, Kings of the earth, and Unsung heroes. After a period, it is reported that Ogilvie rode overland back to the Bourke area, and then onto the Forbes area of the Colony of New South Wales as 'drover, horse-breaker, rouseabout, and gentleman at large'.

In 1894, Ogilvie was employed as a roustabout at Gunningbland station, near Parkes, New South Wales. Later on he travelled to Nelungaloo station (owned by the Reg Lackey family), and Genangie station at Peak Hill, also near Parkes, New South Wales. It was at Nelungaloo he met and became the friend of Harry 'Breaker' Morant, even writing Ode to 'The Breaker' in bandages following a horse-riding accident. This period also saw Morant and Ogilvie become good friends all-round with Western Champion newspaper editor Gordon Tidy. With Morant's death by firing squad during the Second Boer War in South Africa in 1902, Ogilvie penned Harry Morant:

Harry Morant was a friend I had

In the years long passed away,

A chivalrous, wild and reckless lad,

A knight born out of his day,

He loved a girl, and he loved a horse,

And he never let down a friend,

And reckless he was, but he rode his course

With courage up to the end,

"Breaker Morant" was the name he earned,

For no bucking horse could throw

This Englishman who had lived and learned

As much as the bushmen know.

"The Breaker" is sleeping in some far place

Where the Boer War heroes lie,

And we'll meet no more in a steeplechase–

Harry Morant and I.

Ogilvie's other poems about 'The Breaker' included When The Breaker is booked for the south, H. Morant 'Breaker' leaves with S.A. Contingent, 'Glenrowan' to 'The Breaker' , and To the memory of Harry Morant (circa 1902). Tidy wrote Morant's obituary. Ogilvie and Tidy maintained a strong friendship during their lives.

The poem For the honor of Old England and the glory of the game (1897) of an actual polo competition in the Parkes, New South Wales area, involving Morant and Ogilvie was not the same as Banjo Paterson's The Geebung Polo Club which was written four years earlier although surmised by some later writers.

It appears one of Ogilvie's last Australian stations was Brindinyabba, New South Wales, near his first station of Belalie, between Enngonia and Hungerford, Queensland. His understanding of conservation was demonstrated circa 1900 when he berated another labourer for clearing mulga trees by saying 'Still killing Australia?'. Ogilvie pointed out the value of the plant, this at a time of the Federation Drought.

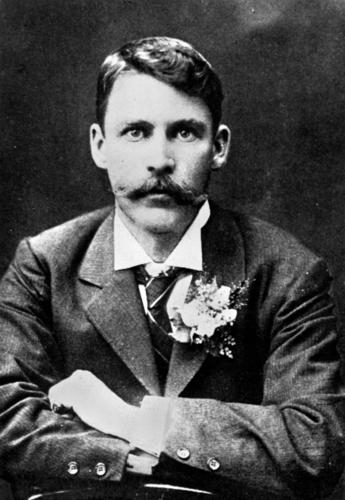
Will H. Ogilvie, circa 1901, aged about 30

One poem about New South Wales bushranger Ben Hall (1837–1865), The death of Ben Hall, has been suggested to be written not by Ogilvie. The history of Hall was certainly known to Ogilvie, the poem was published under Ogilvie's name, as well as him penning another poem, Ben Hall's stirrup irons.

Collected from Australian newspapers of the preceding five years, a selection of poems within the book entitled Fair girls and gray horses was published by The Bulletin in November 1898 and was well received as 'the most charming book of Australian verse that has yet appeared'. The book was reprinted four times by 1901 due to demand. Subsequent editions contained varying numbers of poems, and in different orders (for example the 1905 edition at fourteen thousand impressions had 95 poems and a photograph of a young Will sitting with his arms crossed, while the 1930 edition of nineteen thousand impressions had 84 poems and a photograph of Will standing beside his dog).

Scottish-Australian book sellers, Angus & Robertson commenced operation in 1886 in Sydney. This Scottish background influenced the books offered for sale, together with the Robertson's experiences of hardship and humanity led to supporting writers, and manuscripts of bush life. Bush ballads particularly were understood by the Australian public. Kipling also encouraged the company to foster Australian poetry through ballads too, the words becoming part of the cultural identity. With this foundation, Ogilvie became an Angus & Robertson author.

Ogilvie was castigated for embellishing the mythology of the Australian outback and life:

In his later days, Will. Ogilvie has been responsible for some very exquisite verse. His early efforts were too effusive in their praise of our bush and its beauty, and this fact does not please many. That we can let pass, because he was fascinated by the country and bush life as he found it in the New South Wales and Queensland life he lived; so much so that he has not always exercised due restraint in his poetic outbursts. To those who claim to know this verse of Henry Lawson comes as the voice of truth, sure and firm after the Scotchman's fine prettiness: I think Ogilvie's mistake was that he emphasised the charm of the bush in place of the lure. The bush is a fierce, hungry mistress, who is too passionate in her moods for the word "charm" to be anything but a misplaced one. Nevertheless, W. H. Ogilvie is enchanting at his best moments. His ringing verse at times reminds us of the ringing echos of the galloping hoofs of the horses this man knew and loved so well.

It was accepted he wrote about the Australian bush with romanticism.

The camp fire gleams resistance

To every twinkling star;

The horse bells in the dlstance

Are jangling faint and far:

Through gum boughs lorn and lonely

The passing breezes sigh;

In all the world are only

My star-crowned love and I.

The poem A Scotch night (also known as The wee Scotch night and A braw Scotch nicht) is well-associated with Ogilvie, first published under his own name in The Bulletin in Australia. There was an attempt by one person to 'pirate it in Scotland, but Mr. Ogilvie promptly exposed the dishonest trick'. Despite all this, the poem was the one for which he sought not to be remembered. Thinking it more suited to the traditional music halls, Will H. Ogilvie desired something more serious.

Some of his work included songs which were set to music, such as Bells along Macquarie in the 1901 Commonwealth Annual, and The barefoot maid with music by Donald Crichton. May 1900 saw a ten guinea competition prize awarded to Sydney composer George Ernest Vincent (–1932) for the best musical setting for Hearts of gold.

It was unknown if the phrase 'back of Bourke' was in common use at the time or popularised by Ogilvie in his poem At the back o' Bourke.

By late January 1901, on his imminent return to Scotland after eleven years, he had progressed from being labelled as coming to the colonies for experience, to one of the colonists ('though only a ten-year colonist'), to being identified as an Australian ('Poet Will Ogilvie goes to Scotland after a sojourn of several years in the Australian bush. Australian poets appear to have excellent luck nowadays.'). His farewell bohemian banquet at the Hotel Australia, Sydney, was hosted by also-notable poets Louise Mack and Victor Daley, and included the participation of colleagues Banjo Paterson and Roderic Quinn.

== Scottish period ==
After returning from Australia in 1901 aboard the SS Persic, and again in 1908 after two years away in the United States of America, Ogilvie settled into the role of 'Border poet' based in the south near the Scottish–English border. Whaup o' the rede was composed in 1908, and was a long poem said to be in the way of Sir Walter Scott (1771–1832). With his unshakeable love for the area, already declared in Bowmont Water, far away written while he was in Australia, in 1909 came The land we love:

When all sounds else are silent.

when all songs else depart,

The brown burns of the Border

Shall sing within my heart.

Now with children, Ogilvie penned some graceful lullabies and children's songs. The daily routine after breakfast and reading prayers was to sit down with a pencil and notepad, and started with a couplet from a recent thought. Poems were not typed but done by hand, as was also his late-1890s practice, 'A memory of him clings locally as a good-natured, easy going bushman, who sauntered leisurely into the newspaper office, presented a crumpled and often soiled manuscript, and, after inviting the staff to have a drink, would turn his gray once more to Gunningbland'. His interest in horses continued with Galloping shoes, Over the grass and Handful of leather.

Several of his poems were set to be sung, including Ettrick that is performed regularly at the Selkirk common riding. Ogilvie was one of the Selkirk Pageant committee members in 1935, where he wrote the prologue and epilogue.

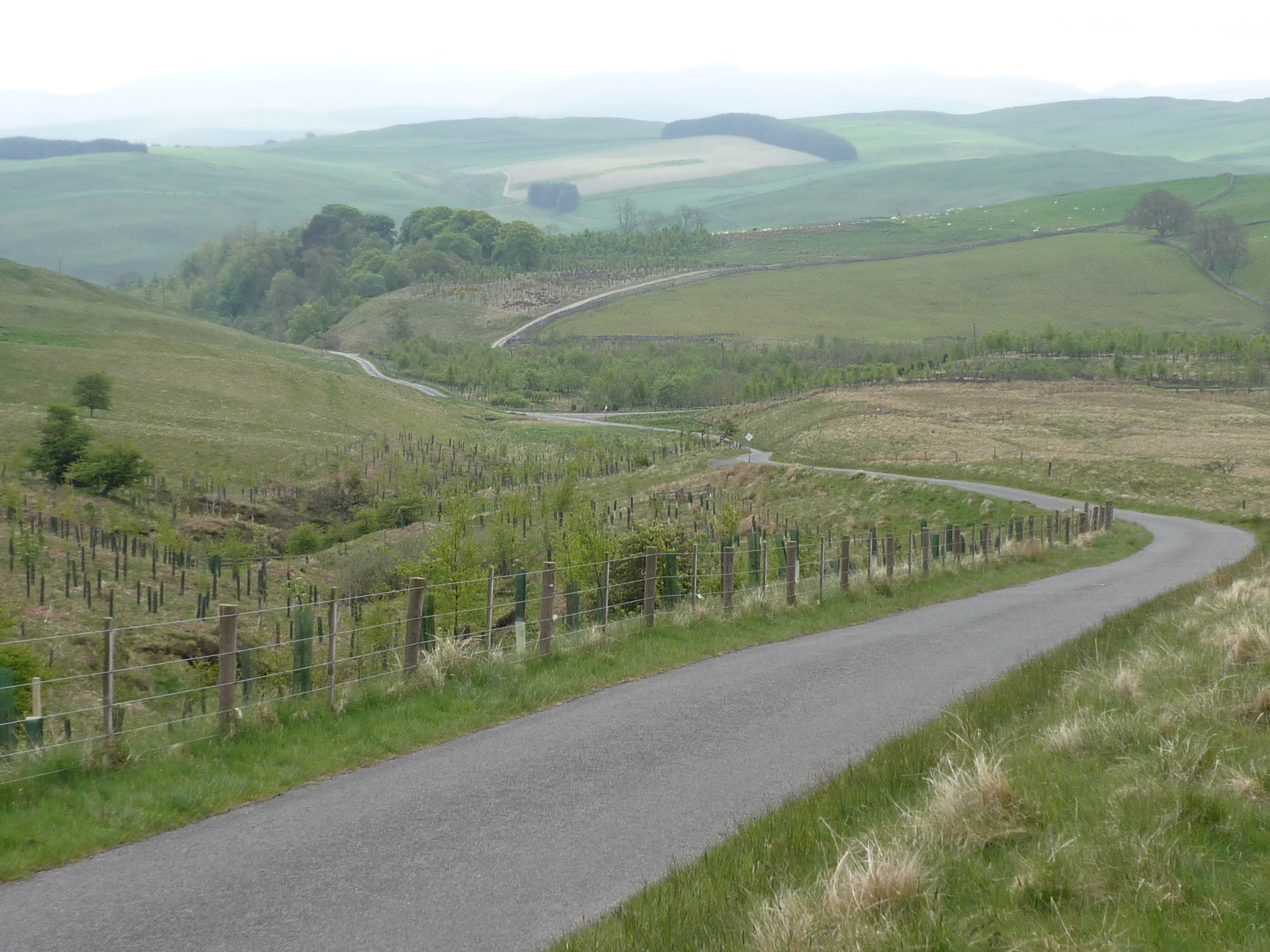
Rolling hills along the Blawearie-to-Roberton road via Harden Glen.

Rural life was captured in many of his Border poems. Opinion articles were sent to Australia including about sheep and sheep dog. Ogilvie showed he more than just a poet but an astute observer and technical knowledge in these areas, reflected in the poem To a champion dead about 'Old Kep', a world-famous champion Scotch collie. He corresponded with renown Australian kelpie authority Tony Parsons on the breed. Later photographs of Will usually featured one of his dogs.

By 1961, some sixteen volumes of verse, two large collected editions, and numerous magazine and other contributions had been published. Since his death, more of his poems are being re-discovered in old newspaper archives, and in past correspondence with acquaintances.

Ogilvie's most commonly recited poems are A Scotch night, Bowmont Water, Ho for the blades of Harden, The barefoot maid, The comfort of the Hills, The land we love, The Raiders, and The road to Roberton.

== Similar names ==
During Will H. Ogilvie's life, there was also an unrelated but similarly named poet, Edinburgh architect and illustrator William Ogilvie (1891–1939). The latter poet published The witch and other verses (1923; 8 pages) and My mither's aunt and other verses (1926; 8 pages), by Porpoise Press, Edinburgh. (Note: Edinburgh architect William Ogilvie's ten known poems are: Bob, Guid enough for me, Mrs Claicher's song, My mither's aunt, Straught, straught's a reed, The interruption, The lodger, The parrot, The witch, There's nane o' my ain to care. They are written in 1930s Scottish Edinburgh vernacular and distinct from the language used by Will H. Ogilvie.)

Will H. Ogilvie should also not be confused with an Australian soldier, Trooper William Hedley Blair Ogilvie, who was also erroneously listed as William Henry Ogilvie, as probably a clerical error due to a name association. Trooper Ogilvie (13 April 1880 – 12 December 1901), of Parkside, South Australia, one of the six children of Walter Ogilvie and Annie Passfield (1846–), joined the Fourth Imperial Bushmen Contingent, and died from fever during the Second Boer War.

== Legacy ==
'Poets Trek', part of the Festival of a Thousand Stories, is held annually in September for over twenty years, in Bourke, New South Wales as a two-day literary tour. Led by a group of local poets and enthusiasts, the trek goes through some of the mulga plains and paddocks trod by Lawson, Morant, Ogilvie, and Paterson.

Several poems were set to music during Ogilvie's lifetime, including by famed English composer Graham Peel with 1920 'The challenge'. Slim Dusty's 1980 The man who steadies the lead song compilation acknowledged two of Will's works – the self-titled album and The pearl of them all. Ogilvie's verse was also put to music by bush poet Gary Fogarty, of Millmerran, Queensland, with thirteen poems on The Tartan Saddlecloth in 2005. Scotland's Hawick-based 'folk-and-roll' band Scocha set several of Will's poems to music, and continued by the restructured and renamed group as 'Harden Blades'.

In 1959, Hazel de Berg, who interviewed many people within Australia including author May Gibbs and journalist Kenneth Cook, audio-recorded Ogilvie reciting sixteen of his poems. Poems included 'The bushmen', 'From the Gulf', 'The men who blazed the track', 'Opals', 'A leaf from Macquarie', and 'Kelpies'. The preserved recording is held by the National Library of Australia.

A portrait of Will is in the collection (#1646) of the Toowoomba Regional Art Gallery, Toowoomba, Queensland. The oil-on-canvas portrait measuring 46 cm high and 35.5 cm wide by Mary Lindsay-Oliver was donated to Bolton by Madge Ogilvie following the death of her husband in July 1963. The associated Bolton Reading Room in the Lionel Lindsay Gallery and Library also holds several of Ogilvie's publications. Transport operator and philanthropist Bill Bolton MBE (1905–1973), an admirer of Australian pioneer values, and who had corresponded with Ogilvie over time, established the gallery and library in 1959.

The nearby Cobb & Co Museum, featuring all of Bolton's horse-drawn wagons and stage coaches, also have Ogilvie's treasured stockwhip and other items.

A memorial committee was set up Scotland in 1991 to raise funds to promote the name of Ogilvie and his works. The Will H. Ogilvie Memorial Trust had a large programme of events planned for 2019 with the 150th birthday of the poet.

On Saturday 20 July 2019 the 'Will H. Ogilvie Way' was opened at the start of the B6352 road south of Kelso, Scottish Borders. The road leads to Holefield Farm, Ogilvie's birthplace.

More material on Ogilvie's life and contributions are also contained within the:

- Geoffrey Cains Collection of Australian manuscripts (MS 15500), State Library of Victoria, Melbourne. After fifty years of significant private collecting, it was acquired in 2014 by the library; and
- John Meredith Papers, National Library of Australia, Canberra. Meredith (1920–2001) wrote the book Breaker's mate: Will Ogilvie in Australia (1996) exploring, critiquing and providing an interpretation of Ogilvie's work. This also includes the unpublished manuscript 'Scottish jackaroo'.

=== Cairns ===
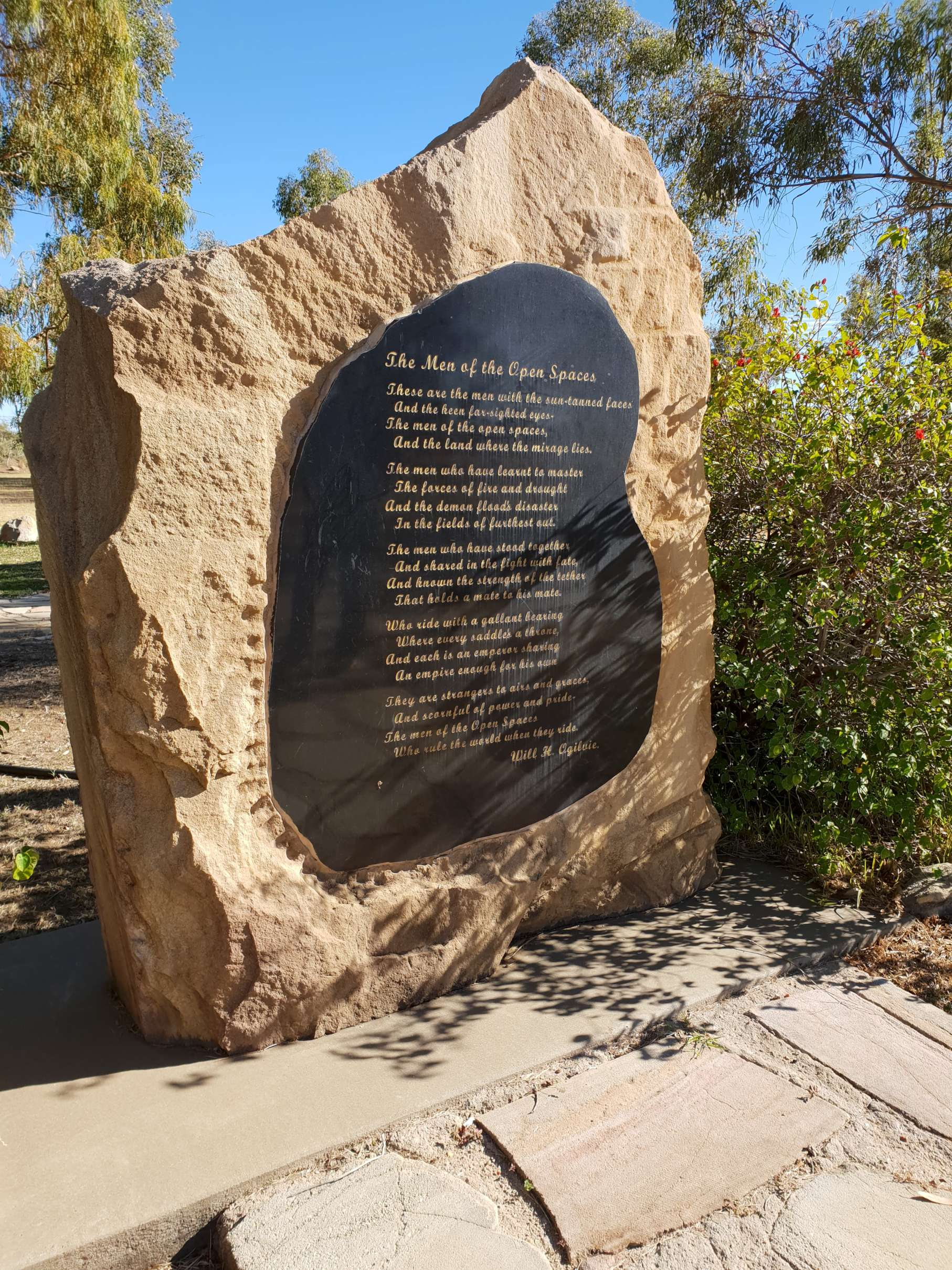
Poem by Ogilvie upon a stone at the entrance of the Stockman's Hall of Fame, Longreach, Queensland, Australia.

A cairn to the poet was erected in 1993 between the villages of Ashkirk and Roberton in Scotland (GPS 55.45914°N 2.87868°W), and there are also memorials to him in Australia. Upon the cairn of reclaimed stone was a bronze sculpture of an open book by Hawick sculptor Bill Landles. Unveiled in August 1993, the bronze was prised from the surface and stolen in August 2016 and still unrecovered by July 2017, feared stolen for scrap metal. The original mould was not retained but a three-dimensional image scan was obtained from the identical cairn in Australia allowing the replacement of a smaller bronze, unveiled on 17 August 2019, albeit in the new setting of Harden (GPS 55.43697°N 2.87705°W). Other cairns are:

- Bourke, New South Wales, given to be an exact Landles bronze replica of the Roberton cairn. Located at Poets' Corner, Central Park, Mitchell Street (the Mitchell Highway) (GPS 30.0892991°S 145.9397753°E);
- Kelso, Scottish Borders, where the Will H. Ogilvie Stone is opposite Holefield Farm at Lempitlaw, on Friday 19 July 2019;
- Longreach, Queensland, at the Australian Stockman's Hall of Fame; and
- Penola, South Australia, a National Trust roadside cairn adjacent to the old shearers quarters at the former Maaoupe station, unveiled on 8 June 1995. This was on the leftside of Maaoupe Road near the Glenroy-Maaoupe Road intersection, 13.8 km from Penola. At a later date the cairn was moved to the other side of the road beside the CFA shed for visitor safety (GPS 37.263452°S 140.726644°E).

A bust of Ogilvie by sculptor Judith Rolevink was unveiled on Sunday 2 December 2018, forming part of Poet's Corner in Penola, South Australia, together with Shaw Neilson. Ogilvie is beside his inspirator, Adam Lindsay Gordon. Penola also has a footpath plaque to Ogilvie.

== Bibliography ==
=== Poetry collections ===
- Fair Girls and Gray Horses: With Other Verses (1898), 170 pages and three illustrations by G. W. Lambert, published by The Bulletin Newspaper, with later reprints by Angus & Robertson. The number of poems changed between some editions from 74, 85, and 99. Dedication was to Hugh Gordon (1857–1910), who oversaw Adavale Station, Parkes, New South Wales
- Hearts of gold, and other verses (1903), 176 pages, published by The Bulletin Newspaper was 3000 copies (and larger printed twenty-five copies on white rather than toned paper). The first edition contained chapter pages with a poem, and was illustrated with images from painters such as Howard Ashton, G. W. Lambert, Frank P. Mahony, Fred Leist, and Norman St Clair Carter (1875–1963). The 1913 Angus & Robertson version of 84 poems was 203 pages, saw a photograph of Ogilvie added, and illustrative images removed. An 'expanded' version was published in 1930 by Angus & Robertson, but removed chapter pages and fourteen poems and added only nine poems, to total 79 poems
- Rainbows and witches (1907), 40 poems, 88 pages, published by Elkin Matthews, London. Fourth reprint in 1911
- Whaup o' the rede (1909), a ballad in seven parts, 118 pages, published by Thomas Fraser, of Dalbeattie, Scotland. The ballad was reprinted in 2019 as part of the 150th birthday celebration
- The land we love (1910), 76 poems, 157 pages, published by Thomas Fraser, of Dalbeattie, Scotland. A second edition was released in 1913
- The overlander, and other verses (1913), 45 poems, 127 pages, published by Fraser, Asher and Company Limited, of Glasgow, Scotland
- Fair girls (1914), 43 poems, 136 pages, published by Angus & Robertson. Together with Fair girls, these publications were merely volumes 1 and 2 of the primary works, Fair girls and gray horses
- Gray horses (1914), published by Angus & Robertson. This subset of the principal works contained 53 poems. Page numbering followed on from Fair girls (1914)
- The Australian and Other Verses (1916), 81 poems, frontispiece and title page with illustrations by Hal Gye, published by Angus & Robertson in two sizes. A 1982 reprint was done by Angus and Robertson. In consideration of World War I, HarperCollins Australia republished the works in March 2018, as the 1916 trench edition
- Galloping shoes: Hunting and polo poems (1922), 46 poems, with illustrations by Lionel Edwards, published by Constable and Co. Limited, London UK
- Scattered scarlet (1923), 40 poems, 83 pages, with illustrations by Lionel Edwards, published by Constable and Co. Limited, London UK
- Over the grass (1925), 43 poems, 82 pages, with five illustrations in colour by Lionel Edwards, published by Constable and Co. Limited, London UK
- A handful of leather (1928), 40 poems, 96 pages, with illustrations by Lionel Edwards, published by Constable and Co. Limited, London UK
- A clean wind blowing : Songs of the out-of-doors (1930), 68 poems, 107 pages, illustrated by John Morton Sale, published by Constable and Co. Limited, London UK
- The collected sporting verse of Will H. Ogilvie (1932), 181 poems, 396 pages, with thirty-two illustrations in colour by Lionel Edwards, published by Constable and Co. Limited, London UK. The work reproduces some poems of previous anthologies such as Galloping shoes (1922), Scattered scarlet (1923), Over the grass (1925), and A handful of leather (1928), as well as 'sixteen poems never before collected'
- Saddles again (1937), 53 poems, with plates by American-born equestrian artist and illustrator Olive Whitmore, and published by Duckworth, London
- From sunset to dawn (1946), 78 poems, 100 pages, published by Angus & Robertson
- Saddle for a throne (1952), 206 poems, 332 pages, published by R. M. Williams, Adelaide. Second and enlarged edition printed in 1982
- The Border poems of Will H. Ogilvie (1959), 77 pages, John Murray Hood, Hawick, Scotland. Reprinted by the Memorial Trust in 1992, with two additional poems

Posthumous collections

- Balladist of Borders & Bush (1994), 42 poems, part of the biography by Ogilvie's son
- The Hill Road to Roberton (2009), 60 poems, 96 pages, produced by the Memorial Trust
- Bits of fun (2013), 59 poems, 104 pages, produced by the Memorial Trust, following the discovery of a work book that had lain dormant for over fifty years
- Belalie and beyond (2021), 275 poems, 393 pages, produced by the Memorial Trust

=== Short story collections ===
- My life in the open (1908), 30 short stories (within chapters 'In the Australian bush', 'In America', 'Here and there', and 'On the Scottish border'), 303 pages, published by T. Fisher Unwin, London
- The honour of the station (1914), paperback of 22 short stories, 122 pages, published by Holding and Hardingham, London, as part of their 'sixpenny novels'
- Horse laughter (1938), edited in conjunction with George Denholm Armour, 87 pages, illustrated by Armour, published by Duckworth, London. A collection of true stories of humour regarding horses

==== Selected list of poems ====
Title	Year	First published	Reprinted/collected in
"From the Gulf"	1895	The Bulletin, 14 December 1895	Fair Girls and Gray Horses: With Other Verses, Bulletin, 1898, pp. 28-29
"The Death of Ben Hall"	1924	Smith's Weekly, 27 September 1924	Not collected

=== Popular poem themes ===
Australiana

- Abandoned selections
- The bush, my lover
- Queensland opal, of the state's unique boulder opal

Dogs

- A champion runs
- Kelpies
- Old Kep (Australian kelpie)
- Tweed (Australian kelpie barb)

Horses

- How the Fire Queen crossed the swamp
- "How We Won the Ribbon" (1898)
- Kings of the earth
- The nearside leader
- "Off the Grass" (1897)
- An 'Orsetralian alphabet
- Out of the chains
- Saddles again, with reference to the horses 'Gato' and 'Mancha' of friend and admirer, Aimé Félix Tschiffely, who rode from Buenos Aires to Washington, D.C.

Scottish sentiment

- Bowmont Water, far away, written while in Australia of his affection for Scotland
- The land we love
- The Scotch fir
- A Scotch night
- Whaup o' the Rede (1908), a ballad of the Border raiders

Shearing

- "Northward to the Sheds" (1895)

War and soldiers

- The real Mackays! (1898), about the military force under Australian then-colonel Kenneth Mackay (1859–1935)
- Your chance, Mackays! (1899)
- The Australian (1916), based on a British military officer's comment on the ANZAC soldier
- "Canadians" (1917)
- "Queenslanders" (1917)

Women

- Fair girls and gray horses
- My Gippsland girl

== See also ==
- Bush ballad
- List of Australian poets
