= From the Gulf =

1895 poem by Will H. Ogilvie

- by Will H. Ogilvie
- Written: 1895
- First published in: The Bulletin
- Illustrator: Frank P. Mahony
- Country: Australia
- Language: English
- Publication date: 14 December 1895
- Lines: 48

Full text
- From the Gulf at Wikisource

"From the Gulf" (1895) is a poem by Scottish poet Will H. Ogilvie.

It was originally published in The Bulletin on 14 December 1895 and subsequently reprinted in the author's first poetry collection and in a number of Australian poetry anthologies.

== Synopsis ==
The poem describes a cattle drive from the Gulf Country down towards the Victorian border, "The stockyards at Wodonga are a long way down from here". The country the drovers pass through is dry and parched, "The creeks won’t run till God knows when, and half the holes are dry,/The tanks are few and far between and water’s dear to buy".

== Critical reception ==
A writer in The West Australian mentioned Ogilvie's place in the roll-call of Australian poets in the previous ninety years of major Australian poetry: "Will Ogilvie, another of the horsey poets, turned his five years droving, horse-breaking in Queensland to effective literary account, and he will live long in the memory of Overlanders for those spirited lines on starving cattle from the 'Gulf' reaching a Queensland border station: 'Oh let them wade in Wonga grass, and taste the Wonga dew,/And let them spread, those thousand head–for we've been droving too.'"

In an overview of Ogilvie's bush ballads for The Bulletin Douglas Stewart said of this poem, among others, that the poet "broadened and dramatised his effects until he achieved much of the epic rush and richness of 'The Man from Snowy River,' making immortal Australian legends out of galloping horses, stampeding mobs of cattle, and the courage and resolution of men".

== Publication history ==
After the poem's initial publication in The Bulletin it was reprinted as follows:

- The Capricornian, 21 December 1895
- The Morning Bulletin, 24 December 1895
- Fair Girls and Gray Horses: With Other Verses, Bulletin, 1898
- The Oxford Book of Australasian Verse edited by Walter Murdoch, Oxford University Press, 1924
- Selections from Australian Poets edited by Bertram Stevens and George Mackaness, Cornstalk Publishing, 1925
- New Song in an Old Land edited by Rex Ingamells, Longmans Green, 1943
- Poets of Australia : An Anthology of Australian Verse edited by George Mackaness, Angus & Robertson, 1946
- Spoils of Time : Some Poems of the English-Speaking Peoples edited by Rex Ingamells, Georgian House, 1948
- An Anthology of Australian Verse edited by George Mackaness, Angus & Robertson, 1952
- Australian Poets Speak edited by Colin Thiele and Ian Mudie, Rigby, 1961
- Favourite Australian Poems edited by Ian Mudie, Rigby, 1963
- From the Ballads to Brennan edited by T. Inglis Moore, Angus & Robertson, 1964
- Songs for All Seasons : 100 Poems for Young People edited by Rosemary Dobson, Angus and Robertson, 1967
- This Land : An Anthology of Australian Poetry for Young People edited by M. M. Flynn and J. Groom, Pergamon Press, 1968
- My Country : Australian Poetry and Short Stories, Two Hundred Years edited by Leonie Kramer, Lansdowne, 1985
- Old Ballads from the Bush edited by Bill Scott, Angus and Robertson, 1987
- Breaker's Mate: Will Ogilvie in Australia edited by John Meredith, Kangaroo Press, 1996
- ReCollecting Albury Writing : Poetry and Prose from Albury and District 1859 to 2000 edited Jane Downing and Dirk H.R. Spennemann, Letao, 2000
- Two Centuries of Australian Poetry edited by Kathrine Bell, Gary Allen, 2007

== See also ==
- 1895 in Australian literature
- 1895 in poetry
