= Francis Skelly Tidy =

British Army officer (1775–1835)

Francis Skelly Tidy CB
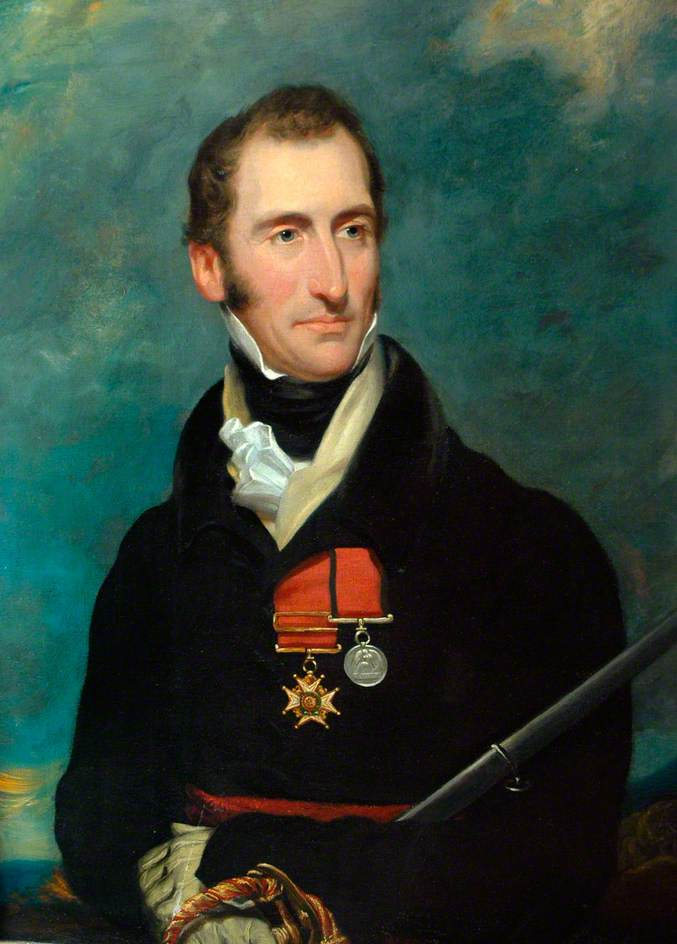
- Colonel Francis Skelly Tidy, veteran of West Indies, Peninsular War, Waterloo, and Burma
- Born: 1775; England
- Died: 9 October 1835 (aged 59–60); Kingston, Ontario, Canada
- Relatives: Thomas Holmes Tidy, Lady Betty Gordon, Major Francis Skelly, Charles Mordaunt
- Military career
- Allegiance: United Kingdom
- Branch: British Army
- Service years: 1791–1835
- Rank: Colonel
- Units: 43rd Foot; 1st West India Regt.; Royal Scots, 8th W.I. Regt.; 14th Foot; 44th Foot; 24th Foot
- Commands: 24th Regiment of Foot (final command)
- Conflicts: West Indies Campaigns; Peninsular War (Spain, 1808); Walcheren Expedition (1809); Waterloo campaign (1815); First Anglo-Burmese War (1825)
- Awards: Companion of the Order of the Bath (C.B.)
- Other work: Subject of *Recollections of an Old Soldier* (1849), memoir by daughter Harriet Ward

Colonel Francis Skelly Tidy (1775–1835) was a British Army officer who served in the Napoleonic Wars and the Burmese Wars. He was the also the subject of Recollections of an Old Soldier, a 1849 memoir by his daughter Harriet Ward.

== Family ==
Francis was the youngest son of the Reverend Thomas Holmes Tidy, chaplain to HM 26th Foot, and afterwards rector of Red Marshall. He was the grandson of Lady Betty Gordon, daughter of Alexander, Duke of Gordon, nephew to Major Francis Skelly, 71st Highlanders who fought at the Siege of Seringapatam. Descendant of Charles Mordaunt, Earl of Peterborough.

His children included Harriet Ward and Thomas Tidy.

== Military career ==
=== West Indies Campaign ===
Tidy joined the 43rd Regiment in Ireland as a volunteer at the age of 16, and was soon assigned the rank of an ensign. While serving with his regiment in the West Indies he wrote:

a 125 mortality of from ten to thirteen men a day reduced the 43rd to 96 rank and file, and Guadaloupe being disputed inch by inch, the 43rd, at the time of its capture at Berville, did not contain more than two officers and twenty men fit for duty.

During the West Indies Campaign, Tidy was captured following the fall of Berville and confined for fifteen months aboard a prison hulk. Where he endured harsh conditions under the authority of Victor Hughs. Tidy was He was subsequently transferred to France and later permitted to return to England on parole.

=== India ===
Tidy was appointed as an adjutant of the 43rd Regiment and promoted to captain in 1st West India Regiment in 1798. In 1799, Tidy was transferred into the Royal Scots and was appointed aide-de-camp to General Sir George Beckwith during his service in the West Indies. He was promoted to major in the 8th West India Regiment and subsequently transferred to the 14th Regiment of Foot in 1807.

=== Napoleonic Wars ===
He served in Spain during the Peninsular campaign of 1808 and later participated in the Walcheren Expedition in 1809. He commanded 3rd Battalion of the 14th (Buckinghamshire) RF at the Battle of Waterloo. His horse shot at Waterloo. He was award the Companion of The Bath (CB) for his service during Waterloo.

=== Later career ===
In 1825, Tidy served in the First Anglo-Burmese War as lieutenant-colonel of the 1st Battalion, 44th Regiment of Foot. He was promoted to a colonel later appointed to command the 24th Regiment of Foot and posted to Kingston Garrison in Upper Canada.

== Death and legacy ==
=== Death ===
He died in command on 9 October 1835 and was buried in Kingston's Lower Burial Ground. His tomb was erected by the officers and men of the regiment as a tribute to his 43 years of military service.

=== Recollections of an Old Soldier ===
Colonel Francis Skelly Tidy is the central figure in Recollections of an Old Soldier, a memoir published in 1849 by his daughter, Harriet Ward. Written under the pseudonym "Colonel Fred Franklin", the book presents a dramatized account of Tidy's military career, drawing on family recollections, regimental memory and oral testimony. It chronicles his service across multiple campaigns including the West Indies, Spain, Waterloo and Burma. The memoir serves both as a tribute and a narrative reconstruction of Tidy's forty-three years of service, offering rare insight in personal and emotional dimensions of a British Officer's life during the Napoleonic era.
