= Fair Girls and Gray Horses: With Other Verses =

Poetry collection by Will H. Ogilvie

Fair Girls and Grey Horses : With Other Verses
- Title page for Fair Girls and Gray Horses: With Other Verses (1905, second edition)
- Author: Will H. Ogilvie
- Language: English
- Publisher: The Bulletin
- Publication date: 1898
- Publication place: Australia
- Media type: Print (Hardback)
- Pages: 167 pp
- Preceded by: -
- Followed by: Hearts of Gold, and Other Verses

Fair Girls and Grey Horses : With Other Verses (1898) is the first collection of poems by Scottish-Australian poet Will H. Ogilvie. It was published in hardback by The Bulletin in Sydney in 1898.

The anthology includes 90 poems by the author.

== Contents ==
- "Fair Girls and Gray Horses'
- "Gold Tresses"
- "A Broken Web"
- "The Township Lights"
- "To a Misogynist"
- "When Horses are Saddled for Love"
- "Star and Star"
- "To-Day"
- "His Gippsland Girl"
- "Whisper Low"
- "A Tell-Tale Tryst"
- "In Mulga Town : A Song"
- "The Old Boat"
- "Love's Moloch"
- "Where the Brumbies Come to Water"
- "Good-Bye"
- "Gray Horses (The Bridle-Track)"
- "From the Gulf"
- "The Riding of the Rebel"
- "Four-in-Hand"
- "The Stockyard Liar"
- "The Border Gate"
- "Outlaws Both"
- "The Coach of Death"
- "Darrell"
- "Off the Grass"
- "His Epitaph"
- "The Dingo of Brigalow Gap"
- "How the Chestnut Horse Came Home"
- "A Draft From Tringadee"
- "Taken Over"
- "The Station Brand"
- "Out of the Chains"
- "The Man That Steadies the Lead"
- "How the Fire Queen Crossed the Swamp (How the 'Fire-King' Crossed the Swamp)"
- "The Near-Side Leader"
- "The Silent Squadron"
- "Riderless"
- "Kings of the Earth"
- "Unbroken"
- "How We Won the Ribbon"
- "Habet!"
- "The World Beyond"
- "Northward to the Sheds"
- "Life's Overland"
- "At the Back O' Bourke"
- "Song of Songs"
- "At the Bend o' the Creek"
- "West of the World"
- "A Scotch Night"
- "'Absent Friends!'"
- "The March of the Flood"
- "A Wind From the West"
- "Abandoned Selections"
- "The Men Who Blazed the Track (The Men Who Blazed the Track : A Toast)"
- "Vita Brevis"
- "The Truest Friend"
- "Auld Lang Syne"
- "Beyond Coolgardie"
- "Deserted"
- "The Filling of the Swamps"
- "Black Sheep"
- "The Coming Home"
- "The Wallaby Track"
- "Beyond the Barrier"
- "Rainbows and Witches"
- "Handicapped"
- "Memory Town"
- "To a Bunch of Heather"
- "The Front Rank"
- "New Moon"
- "The Bush, My Lover"
- "A Spin of the Coin"
- "A Dreamer of Dreams"
- "The Graves Out West"
- "Fairy-Tales"
- "Ben Hall's Stirrup-Irons"
- "Ballade of Windy Nights"
- "The Bushman's Friend"
- "Christmas Night"
- "Bowmont Water"
- "The Rose Out of Reach"
- "Sorry to Go"
- "The Land of Dumb Despair"
- "The Overlander's Farewell to His Mates (L'Envoi : To the Overlanders)"

== Critical reception ==
A writer in The Sydney Morning Herald noted, of the original publication: "A beautiful volume, as far as typography goes, is Mr Will H. Ogilvie's 'Fair Girls and Gray Horses,' a collection of Australian poetry with the imprint of the 'Bulletin' Company. The real westward—that means anywhere from Menindie to the Gulf of Carpentaria and west of the Darling and its tributaries—has never been so celebrated. Mr Ogilvie may, indeed, be called the laureate of Bourke and 'back of beyond.'"

The reviewer in The Daily Telegraph was impressed with the collection: "There is real stuff here — not pink and white prettiness. The good red blood flows in every line, making passing faults of style more than pardonable, and throwing a glow over occasional lapses into mere rhyme. Not that such blemishes are flagrant or frequent. Feeling to a large extent makes its own forms and marks its own boundaries; and genuine poetic instinct rarely strikes a thoroughly jarring note. This instinct Mr. Ogilvie possesses in a very high degree. He combines the spirited ring of Paterson with the more delicate intuition of Lawson and Daley."

The Oxford Companion to Australian Literature states: "The poems, a mixture of ballads and lyrics, celebrated all 'Fair Girls' and 'all Gray horses', for Ogilvie believed that 'Golden and Gray are the loves to hold'...it is in lyrics such as 'A Telltale Tryst' and 'The Bush, My Lover', where the loveliness of fair girls blends with the shimmering Australian moonlight, that Ogilvie's singular conrtribution to the verse of the period lies."

== Publication history ==
After the original publication of the book in 1898, it was reprinted as follows:

- The Bulletin, 1899 [Note: this edition has an additional 25 poems included.]
- The Bulletin, 1901 [Note: reprint of the 1899 edition.]
- Angus and Robertson, 1906
- Simpkin Marshall, London, 1907
- Angus and Robertson, 1913
- Angus and Robertson, 1930, 1933, 1936, 1958
- Pollard, 1974

== See also ==
- 1898 in poetry
- 1898 in Australian literature

== Notes ==
- Dedication: To my Friend, Hugh Gordon.
- The collection consists of three parts: 'Fair Girls', 'Gray Horses' and 'Other Verses'.
- Percival Serle's Bibliography of Australasian Poetry and Verse (1925) notes that there are three illustrations by George W. Lambert.
