= Thomas Tidy (British Army officer) =

British Army general

Major-General Thomas Tidy
- Born: c.1808
- Died: 1 July 1874
- Military career
- Allegiance: United Kingdom
- Branch: British Army
- Rank: Major-General
- Commands: Eastern District

Major-General Thomas Holmes Tidy (c.1808 – 1 July 1874) was a British Army officer who became General Officer Commanding Eastern District.

== Early life ==
Thomas Tidy was the son of Colonel Francis Skelly Tidy (1775–1835). Frank Tidy was the son of Reverend Thomas Holmes Tidy (1766–), chaplain to His Majesty's 26th regiment of foot, and Henrietta Augusta Skelly (1766–). Thomas Tidy's son was British soldier, Australian jackaroo and tutor, journalist, and minister of religion Gordon Tidy (c. 1862–1953).

== Military career ==
Tidy was commissioned as an ensign in the 14th Regiment of Foot on 14 April 1825. He became Deputy Adjutant-General in Jamaica in the late 1850s, Assistant Adjutant General at Horse Guards in the early 1860s and General Officer Commanding Eastern District in April 1866.
