= Scocha =

Folk band from Hawick, Scotland

Scocha were a self-proclaimed "folk and roll" band from Hawick, Scotland.

== Background ==
Formed around 1991, Scocha became established as a performing duo after the release of the album Bordering On in 2001. The band was founded by Iain Scott and David 'Chappy' Chapman (hence 'Sco' + 'Cha'), sharing guitars and vocals, who were later joined by Phil Clayton (bass guitar), then Alan Brydon (multiple instruments) and Dougie Anderson (drums).

In 2012 Alan Brydon left, Dougie Anderson moved to guitar and Ross Walsh took over on drums. In 2014 Neil Jackson replaced Phil Clayton on bass.

Since forming they have steadily grown in popularity and are now a well-known band in the Scottish Borders and beyond. They have released a number of albums as well as a live DVD that captures the atmosphere of one of their gigs, and two CD singles, The Borders and Turnbull Songs.

Border poet Will H. Ogilvie (1869–1963) has provided words and inspiration for songs such as 'Raiders', 'Ho for the Blades of Harden' and 'The land we love'.

In June 2019, a restructured band consisting of David Chapman, Dougie Anderson, Ross Walsh and Neil Jackson was established with the name of Harden Blades, following Scocha's disbandment in January 2019. The new name is a reference to Ogilvie's inspiration.

=== Performances ===
Scocha performed before 15,000 people at the Glengarry Highland Games, the biggest highland games in North America in July 2008, and they returned to headline again in July 2010. The band has played at Tartan Week in New York City many times, and other North American festivals, as well as appearing at festivals throughout Europe.

== Discography ==
- Bordering on
- The land we love
- Gie'd sum wellie
- Scocha live
- Scattyboo
- Moonlight again (released October 2016)
- Live on the Border (released November 2017)

== See also ==
- Will H. Ogilvie (1869–1963), Scottish-Australian poet and balladeer
