= Western Champion (Parkes) =

Former newspaper in New South Wales, Australia

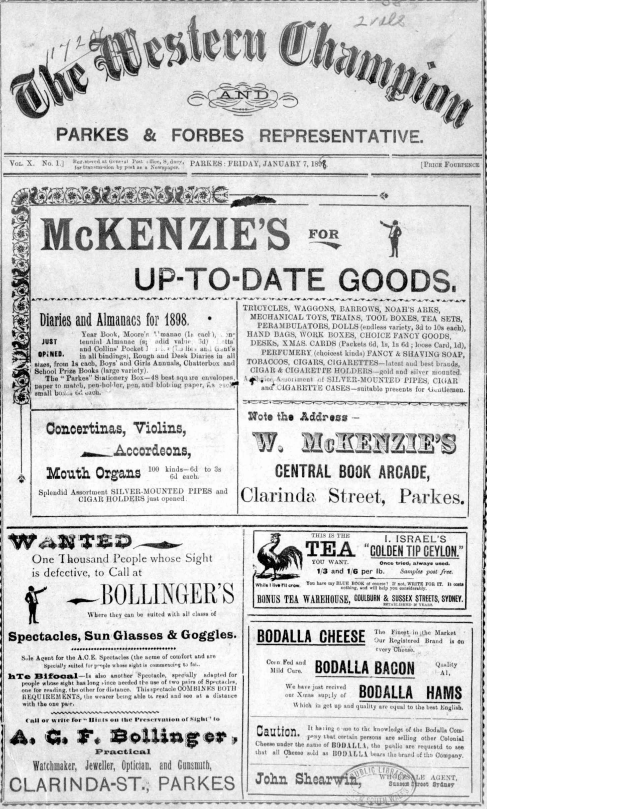
Western Champion, 7 January 1898.

The Western Champion was a weekly English language newspaper published in Parkes, New South Wales, Australia.

== History ==
The town of Parkes had been served with many newspapers. The Western Champion began in 1893 and was published by M. J. Little. The editor in the late 1890s was Gordon Tidy.

After 33 years as the proprietor, William Giles also acquired the Parkes Post by September 1932. Working from their separate offices, the Champion would publish on a Friday, and the Post on the Tuesday. It ceased in 1934 and merged with the Champion Post to form the Parkes Post. The paper consisted mainly of advertising and news columns once a month.

Today the newspaper operates as the Parkes Champion-Post.

== Digitisation ==
The various versions of the paper have been digitised as part of the Australian Newspapers Digitisation Program project hosted by the National Library of Australia.

== See also ==
- List of newspapers in New South Wales
- List of newspapers in Australia

== Bibliography ==
- Country conscience : a history of the New South Wales provincial press, 1841-1995 / by Rod Kirkpatrick, Canberra City, A.C.T. : Infinite Harvest Publishing, 2000
- Looking good : the changing appearance of Australian newspapers / by Victor Isaacs, for the Australian Newspapers History Group, Middle Park, Qld. : Australian Newspaper History Group, 2007.
- Press timeline : Select chronology of significant Australian press events to 2011 / Compiled by Rod Kirkpatrick for the Australian Newspaper History Group
- Australian Newspaper History : A Bibliography / Compiled by Victor Isaacs, Rod Kirkpatrick and John Russell, Middle Park, Qld. : Australian Newspaper History Group, 2004.
- Newspapers in Australian libraries : a union list. 4th ed.
