= Harriet Ward =

British writer

Harriet Ward née Tidy (1808 – 1873), was a British writer whose work is sometimes thought of as South African literature. She lived in the Cape Colony for a few years and her best-known books are set there: the non-fiction Five Years in Kaffirland and the fictional Jasper Lyle, the first English novel set entirely in South Africa. She also wrote articles for a military audience, unusually for a woman of that era. Her writing has stimulated discussion about whether or not she agreed fully with British colonial attitudes.

== Personal life ==
She was born at Thorp, Norfolk in 1808 to Colonel and Mrs Francis Skelly Tidy, née Miss Pinder, daughter of the Chief Justice of Barbados. After school in France and London she married John Ward in 1831. He was a military officer from Waterford, Ireland and his wife accompanied him on various postings. They had one daughter, Isabel. The family lived together on St Helena in the late 1830s. In 1842 they travelled from Cork to the eastern frontier of the Cape and spent five years in the British colony there, at Fort Peddie and Grahamstown, in the so-called "Ceded Territory". Ward returned to Britain in 1848. This is when she started to publish full-length books, building on previous articles and short stories. The Wards may have lived in Dover before moving to Boulogne-sur-Mer in about 1851, but biographical details are scant. She died in 1873.

== Writing ==
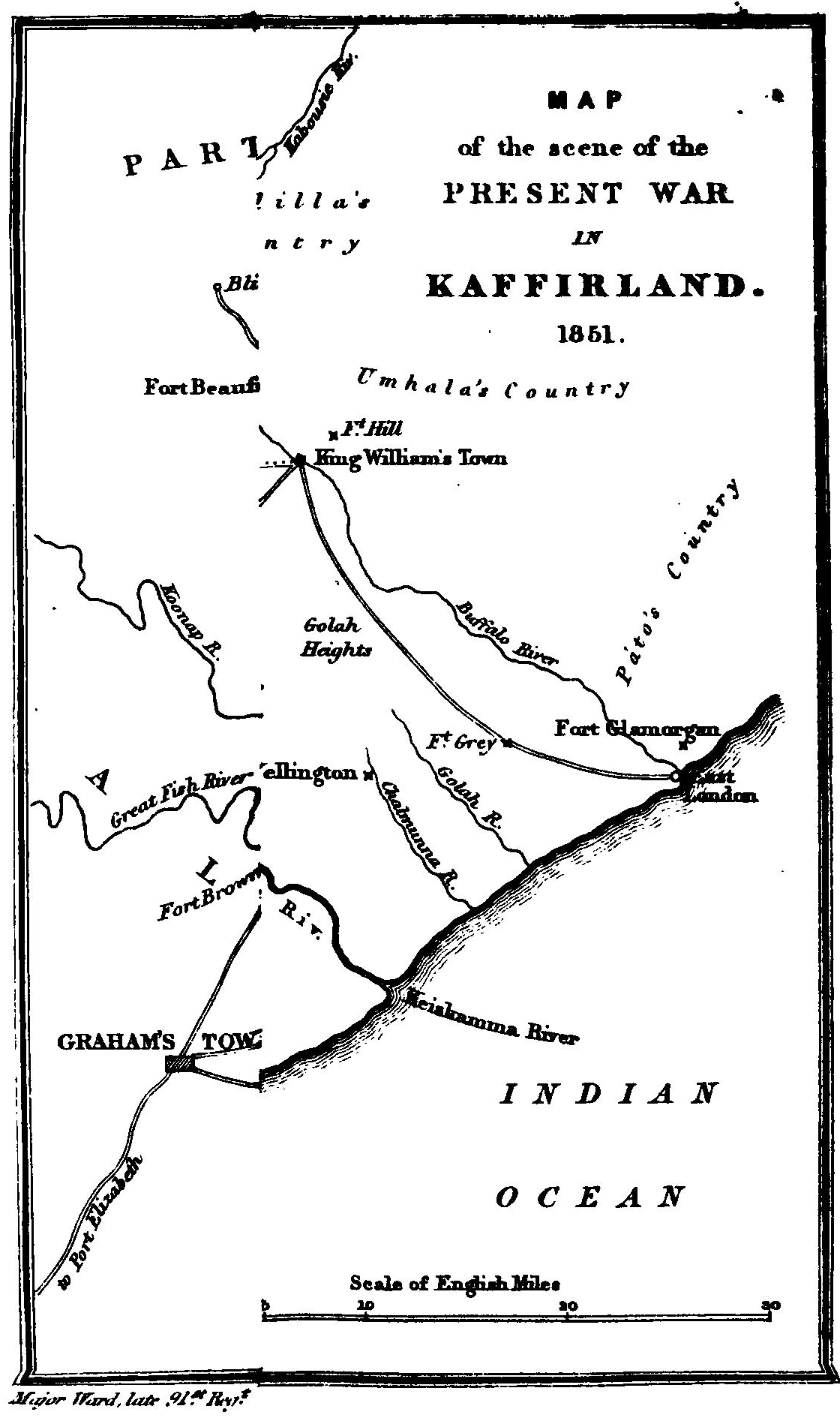
Map of Kaffirland in 1851 by Captain Ward, used in the 3rd edition of Harriet Ward's book.

Her first published writing was in The United Service Journal and Naval and Military Magazine in the early 1840s. She began with articles about her father and later contributed reports about war and life in "Kaffirland", a British name for an area of the Cape Colony stretching from Kaffraria to Albany. (The name was based on the word Kaffir which the British used to describe the indigenous people of that region.) Ward developed an authoritative voice and was one of the first women whose work was treated as credible war reporting. Some of the writing she did in 1846 and 1847 formed the basis for the book which came out soon after her arrival in England in 1848: Five years in Kaffirland: with sketches of the late war in that country to the conclusion of peace: written on the spot.

This book was well-received in a period of public interest in the "Kaffir War" or War of the Axe. and ran to three editions. In the same year Ward's first novel, Helen Charteris, was also published but a reviewer complained that the main romance was "encumbered" by sub-plots. Three years later her novel Jasper Lyle: a tale of Kafirland (sic) was more successful and was described in the Morning Post as "truthful and popular" with a "fidelity and vivacity" in its descriptions of "Kaffir life and scenery", "giving it at the present moment an especial interest". This too ran to three editions, plus two more in the 1870s after Ward's death and just before the Zulu War, when UK interest in South Africa was high.

Critics' interpretations of Ward's overall opinions vary. Some see her as "stridently propagandist" for British imperialism, particularly in her non-fiction writing about colonial South Africa, while others find more complex attitudes, for instance when the eponymous heroine of Helen Charteris is friendly with a Creole girl. Some believe Ward either felt unable to express unconventional views openly or held inconsistent attitudes without being particularly conscious of it. It has also been suggested she was offering a "veiled critique" or even deliberately expressing "anti-colonial dissidence". One critic thinks she wrote at first with "full complicity in the prejudices of the frontier" but later revealed a "startling mismatch" with this in her novels.

== Select bibliography ==
=== Books available online ===
- Five years in Kaffirland: with sketches of the late war in that country, to the conclusion of peace. Written on the spot. (1848)
- Recollections of an old soldier. A biographical sketch of the late Colonel Tidy, C.B., 24th Regiment, with anecdotes of his contemporaries. (1849)
- Jasper Lyle, a tale of Kafirland. (1851)

=== Other novels ===
- Helen Charteris (1848)
- Hester Fleming: the good seed and its certain fruit (1854)
- Lizzy Dorian, the Soldier's Wife (1854)
- Hardy and Hunter (1858)
