= 1951 in Australian literature =

This article presents a list of the historical events and publications of Australian literature during 1951.

== Events ==
- 18 June – Frank Hardy is acquitted of criminal libel in the state of Victoria over his self-published 1950 roman à clef on corruption in Melbourne political life, Power Without Glory

== Books ==
- Dymphna Cusack – Say No to Death
- Dymphna Cusack and Florence James – Come In Spinner
- Eric Lambert – The Twenty Thousand Thieves
- Kenneth Mackenzie – Dead Men Rising
- Ruth Park – The Witch's Thorn
- Nevil Shute – Round the Bend
- Dal Stivens – Jimmy Brockett
- F. J. Thwaites – The Dark Abyss
- E. V. Timms – The Valleys Beyond
- Arthur Upfield – The New Shoe

== Short stories ==
- Henrietta Drake-Brockman & Walter Murdoch – Australian Short Stories (edited)
- Frank Hardy – The Man from Clinkapella and Other Prize-Winning Stories
- T. A. G. Hungerford – "The Only One Who Forgot"
- David Rowbotham – "A Schoolie and a Ghost"
- Judah Waten – "Read Politics, Son"
- Judith Wright – "The Ant-Lion"

== Poetry ==
- John Blight – "The Oyster-Eaters"
- David Campbell – "Windy Gap"
- Rosemary Dobson – "Detail from an Annunciation by Crivelli"
- W. E. Harney – "West of Alice"
- A. D. Hope – "The Brides"
- Rex Ingamells – The Great South Land : An Epic Poem
- Nancy Keesing – Imminent Summer
- Christopher Koch – "Half-Heard"
- Eve Langley – "Australia"
- Kenneth Mackenzie – "Caesura"
- Ray Mathew
  - With Cypress Pine
  - "Young Man's Fancy"
- Hal Porter – "Sheep"
- Elizabeth Riddell – "Forebears : The Map"
- Roland Robinson
  - "I Had No Human Speech"
  - "Rock-Lily"
  - "The Tank"
- Douglas Stewart
  - "Mahony's Mountain"
  - "The Sunflowers"
- Judith Wright – "Eroded Hills"

== Biography ==
- Paul Brickhill
  - The Dam Busters
  - The Great Escape

== Drama ==
=== Radio ===
- Henry P. Schoenheimer – Wilbur Wasn't Quite Perfect

=== Theatre ===
- Sumner Locke Elliott – Buy Me Blue Ribbons

== Awards and honours ==
=== Literary ===
Award	Author	Title	Publisher
ALS Gold Medal	Rex Ingamells	The Great South Land : An Epic Poem	Georgian House

=== Children's and Young Adult ===
Award	Category	Author	Title	Publisher
Children's Book of the Year Award	Older Readers	Ruth C. Williams, illustrated by Rhys Williams	Verity of Sydney Town	Angus and Robertson

=== Poetry ===
Award	Author	Title	Publisher
Grace Leven Prize for Poetry	Rex Ingamells	The Great South Land : An Epic Poem	Georgian House

== Births ==
A list, ordered by date of birth (and, if the date is either unspecified or repeated, ordered alphabetically by surname) of births in 1951 of Australian literary figures, authors of written works or literature-related individuals follows, including year of death.

- 18 January – Sally Morgan, author and dramatist
- 22 January – Steve J. Spears, playwright (died 2007)
- 2 May – Valerie Parv, romance novelist (died 2021)
- 24 July – Robert Hood, novelist
- 29 August – Janeen Webb, writer, critic and editor, mainly in the field of science fiction and fantasy
- 12 October – Peter Goldsworthy, novelist
- 16 November – Hazel Rowley, biographer (died 2011)
- 25 November – Van Ikin, academic and editor

Unknown date

- Peter Boyle, poet
- Peter Craven, literary critic
- Susan Duncan, author and journalist (died 2024)
- Stephen Edgar, poet and editor
- Robert Harris, poet (died 1993)
- Mark Henshaw, novelist
- Jill Jones, poet
- Pi O, poet (in Greece)

== Deaths ==
A list, ordered by date of death (and, if the date is either unspecified or repeated, ordered alphabetically by surname) of deaths in 1951 of Australian literary figures, authors of written works or literature-related individuals follows, including year of birth.

- 18 April – Daisy Bates, journalist (born 1859)
- 25 June – Arthur Gask, novelist (born 1869)
- 3 July – Sydney Jephcott, poet (born 1864)
- 4 November — Bartlett Adamson, journalist, poet, writer and political activist (born 1884)
- 16 December – Percival Serle, biographer and bibliographer (born 1871)

== See also ==
- 1951 in Australia
- 1951 in literature
- 1951 in poetry
- List of years in Australian literature
- List of years in literature
