= 1947 in Australian literature =

This article presents a list of the historical events and publications of Australian literature during 1947.

== Events ==
- The Grace Leven Prize for Poetry, worth £50, is awarded for the first time to Pacific Sea by Nan McDonald.

== Books ==
- Jon Cleary – You Can't See 'Round Corners
- Erle Cox – The Missing Angel
- M. Barnard Eldershaw – Tomorrow and Tomorrow
- Miles Franklin – The Thorny Rose
- Arthur Gask – The Dark Mill Stream
- Catherine Gaskin – With Every Year
- Ion L. Idriess – Isles of Despair
- Norman Lindsay – Halfway to Anywhere
- Vance Palmer – Cyclone
- Nevil Shute – The Chequer Board

== Short stories ==
- Myra Morris – The Township
- Judah Waten – "To a Country Town"

== Children's and Young Adult fiction ==
- Ruth C. Williams – Timothy Tatters

== Poetry ==
- David Campbell – "Small-Town Gladys"
- Victor Daley – Creeve Roe : Poetry
- Rosemary Dobson – "Country Press"
- R. D. Fitzgerald – "Fifth Day"
- A. D. Hope – "Conquistador"
- Nancy Keesing – "Detective Story"
- Nan McDonald – Pacific Sea
- John Shaw Neilson – Unpublished Poems of John Shaw Neilson
- Will H. Ogilvie – "Harry Morant"
- Elizabeth Riddell – "The Train in the Night"
- Roland Robinson – "Drifting Dug-Out"
- Douglas Stewart — Glencoe
- Judith Wright
  - "Flame-Tree in a Quarry"
  - "The Bull"
  - "The Cycads"
  - "The Killer"

== Drama ==
=== Radio ===
- John Appleton – Hester's Diary
- Sumner Locke Elliott – Wicked is the Vine

=== Theatre ===
- Vance Palmer – Hail Tomorrow
- Douglas Stewart – Shipwreck
- Patrick White – The Ham Funeral

== Awards and honours ==
Note: these awards were presented in the year in question.

=== Literary ===
Award	Author	Title	Publisher
ALS Gold Medal	Not awarded		

=== Children's and Young Adult ===
Award	Category	Author	Title	Publisher
Children's Book of the Year Award	Older Readers	No award		

=== Poetry ===
Award	Author	Title	Publisher
Grace Leven Prize for Poetry	Nan McDonald	Pacific Sea	Angus and Robertson

== Births ==
A list, ordered by date of birth (and, if the date is either unspecified or repeated, ordered alphabetically by surname) of births in 1947 of Australian literary figures, authors of written works or literature-related individuals follows, including year of death.

- 10 January – Arnold Zable, novelist (in Wellington, New Zealand)
- 15 January – Richard Harland, novelist
- 22 January – Geoffrey Bewley, journalist and short story writer (died 2006)
- 7 February – Elizabeth Honey, children's author, illustrator and poet
- 21 March – Terry Dowling, novelist and short story writer
- 13 April – Amanda Lohrey, novelist
- 4 May
  - Marele Day, novelist
  - Peter Kocan, author and poet
- 13 July – David Marr, journalist and biographer
- 23 September – Gary Crew, novelist
- 29 September – Cassandra Pybus, historian and biographer
- 9 October – Michael Dugan, poet (died 2006)
- 30 October – Gary Catalano, poet and art critic (died 2002)
- 12 November – Martin Johnston, novelist and poet (died 1990)

Unknown date

- Eric Beach, poet and playwright (in New Zealand)(died 2024)
- Jacqueline Kent, writer and biographer
- Rhyll McMaster, novelist
- Bruce Pascoe, novelist
- Graham Rowlands, poet

== Deaths ==
A list, ordered by date of death (and, if the date is either unspecified or repeated, ordered alphabetically by surname) of deaths in 1947 of Australian literary figures, authors of written works or literature-related individuals follows, including year of birth.

- 25 January — Pinchas Goldhar, writer and translator (born 1901)
- 12 February – Douglas Sladen, poet and biographer (born 1856)
- 19 July – Lennie Lower, journalist and novelist (born 1903)
- 18 October – R. H. Croll, poet and writer (born 1869)
- 1 November – Tilly Aston, blind writer and teacher (born 1873)

== See also ==
- 1947 in Australia
- 1947 in literature
- 1947 in poetry
- List of years in Australian literature
- List of years in literature
