= 1944 in Australian literature =

This article presents a list of the historical events and publications of Australian literature during 1944.

== Events ==
- The Ern Malley literary hoax is conceived when Angry Penguins editor Max Harris publishes the poems of the fictitious poet Ern Malley in the Autumn 1944 edition of his magazine. The poems had been concocted in 1943 by Australian writers James McAuley and Harold Stewart.

== Books ==
- Bernard Cronin – The Shadows Mystery
- Zora Cross – This Hectic Age
- Zane Grey – Wilderness Trek: A Novel of Australia
- Nevil Shute – Pastoral
- Christina Stead – For Love Alone

== Short stories ==
- Alan Marshall – "Trees Can Speak"
- Katharine Susannah Prichard – Potch and Colour

== Children's and Young Adult fiction ==
- Peg Maltby
  - Peg's Fairy Book
  - Introducing Pip and Pepita

== Poetry ==
- Rosemary Dobson – In a Convex Mirror: Poems
- Geoffrey Dutton – Night Flight and Sunrise
- E. M. England – Queensland Days : Poems
- R. D. Fitzgerald – "The Face of the Waters"
- Mary E. Fullerton – "Emus"
- William Hart-Smith – "Baiamai's Never-Failing Stream"
- Nora Kelly – 1940–1942
- Will Lawson – Bill the Whaler and Other Verse
- James McAuley – "The Blue Horses"
- Ern Malley – The Darkening Ecliptic
- Ian Mudie – Poets at War: An Anthology of Verse by Australian Servicemen (edited)
- Elizabeth Riddell – "The Children March"
- Kenneth Slessor
  - "Beach Burial"
  - One Hundred Poems: 1919–1939
- Judith Wright
  - "Bora Ring"
  - "Brother and Sisters"
  - "Bullocky"
  - "Country Town"
  - "For New England"
  - "Remittance Man"

== Biography ==
- James Devaney – Shaw Neilson
- Miles Franklin and Kate Baker – Joseph Furphy: The Legend of a Man and His Book
- Alan Marshall – These are My People

== Awards and honours ==
=== Literary ===
Award	Author	Title	Publisher
ALS Gold Medal	Not awarded		

== Births ==
A list, ordered by date of birth (and, if the date is either unspecified or repeated, ordered alphabetically by surname) of births in 1944 of Australian literary figures, authors of written works or literature-related individuals follows, including year of death.

- 3 January – Blanche d'Alpuget, novelist and biographer
- 20 January – Caroline Caddy, poet
- 17 February – Robert Dessaix, novelist and journalist
- 25 March – Tim Thorne, poet (died 2021)
- 22 April – Damien Broderick, novelist and journalist (died 2025)
- 15 May – David Foster, novelist
- 22 May – John Flanagan, novelist (died 2026)
- 23 July – Alex Buzo, playwright (died 2006)
- 27 July – Andrew Burke, poet (died 2023)
- 25 December – Ross Fitzgerald, novelist and historian
- 29 December – Gerard Windsor, novelist

Unknown date

- Bruce Elder, journalist
- Morag Fraser, journalist and critic

== Deaths ==
A list, ordered by date of death (and, if the date is either unspecified or repeated, ordered alphabetically by surname) of deaths in 1944 of Australian literary figures, authors of written works or literature-related individuals follows, including year of birth.

- 11 April — James Picot, poet and critic (born 1906)
- 13 April – Ambrose Pratt, novelist (born 1874)
- 5 June – Capel Boake, novelist (born 1889)
- 20 August — C. H. Souter, poet (born 1864)
- 27 December – Agnes Littlejohn, poet and short story writer (born 1865)

== See also ==
- 1944 in Australia
- 1944 in literature
- 1944 in poetry
- List of years in Australian literature
- List of years in literature
