= 1953 in Australian literature =

This article presents a list of the historical events and publications of Australian literature during 1953.

== Books ==
- Charmian Clift and George Johnston – The Big Chariot
- Alec Coppel – The Last Parable
- Dymphna Cusack – Southern Steel
- Eleanor Dark – No Barrier
- T. A. G. Hungerford – Riverslake
- Ion Idriess – The Red Chief
- Jack Lindsay – Betrayed Spring : A Novel of the British Way
- Ruth Park – A Power of Roses
- Nevil Shute – In the Wet
- Kylie Tennant – The Joyful Condemned
- F. J. Thwaites – Roof Over Heaven
- E. V. Timms – The Scarlet Frontier
- Arthur Upfield – Murder Must Wait

== Short stories ==
- A. Bertram Chandler – "Jetsam"
- Stephen Murray-Smith – The Tracks We Travel : Australian Short Stories (edited)
- Colin Roderick – Australian Round-Up : Stories from 1790 to 1950 (edited)
- Dal Stivens – The Gambling Ghost and Other Tales
- Judith Wright – "The Weeping Fig"

== Children's and Young Adult fiction ==
- K. Langloh Parker – Australian Legendary Tales, edited by Henrietta Drake-Brockman, illustrated by Elizabeth Durack
- Joan Phipson – Good Luck to the Rider, illustrated by Margaret Horder

== Poetry ==
- John Blight
  - "Cormorants"
  - "Crab"
  - "Mangrove"
  - "Stonefish and Starfish"
- Dulcie Deamer – The Blue Centaur
- Rosemary Dobson – "The Birth"
- A. D. Hope – "Imperial Adam"
- James McAuley – "Late Winter"
- David Martin – "Bush Christmas"
- T. Inglis Moore – Australia Writes : An Anthology (edited)
- Marjorie Pizer – Freedom on the Wallaby : Poems of the Australian People (edited)
- Elizabeth Riddell – "Country Tune"
- Roland Robinson – Tumult of the Swans
- Douglas Stewart – "Christmas Bells"
- Francis Webb – Birthday
- Judith Wright
  - "The Harp and the King"
  - "Request to a Year"
  - The Gateway

== Biography ==
- Catherine Beatrice Edmonds – Caddie, A Sydney Barmaid
- Margaret Herron – Down the Years

== Non-Fiction ==
- James H. Martin & W. D. Martin – Aircraft of Today and Tomorrow

== Awards and honours ==
=== Literary ===
Award	Author	Title	Publisher
ALS Gold Medal	Not awarded		

=== Children's and Young Adult ===
Award	Category	Author	Title	Publisher
Children's Book of the Year Award	Older Readers	James H. Martin & W. D. Martin	Aircraft of Today and Tomorrow	Angus and Robertson
Children's Book of the Year Award	Older Readers	Joan Phipson, illustrated by Margaret Horder	Good Luck to the Rider	Angus and Robertson

=== Poetry ===
Award	Author	Title	Publisher
Grace Leven Prize for Poetry	Roland Robinson	Tumult of the Swans	Edwards and Shaw

== Births ==
A list, ordered by date of birth (and, if the date is either unspecified or repeated, ordered alphabetically by surname) of births in 1953 of Australian literary figures, authors of written works or literature-related individuals follows, including year of death.

- 9 January – Morris Gleitzman, writer for children
- 12 January – David Brooks, novelist and poet
- 5 February – Rod Jones, novelist
- 13 March – Stephen Sewell, playwright
- 18 April – Leigh Hobbs, artist and writer for children
- 14 May – Kerryn Goldsworthy, academic, editor and critic
- 30 August – Ross Clark, poet
- 29 November – Jackie French, writer for children

Unknown date

- Marion Lennox, novelist
- Ian McBryde, poet
- Shane Maloney, novelist
- Chris Mansell, poet and publisher

== Deaths ==
A list, ordered by date of death (and, if the date is either unspecified or repeated, ordered alphabetically by surname) of deaths in 1953 of Australian literary figures, authors of written works or literature-related individuals follows, including year of birth.

- 9 April – Albert Dorrington, novelist (born 1874)
- 11 May – Leonora Polkinghorne, novelist and poet (born 1873)
- 22 May — Louis Lavater, composer and author (born 1867)
- 30 June – Beatrice Grimshaw, novelist and travel writer (born 1870)
- 12 August – J. H. M. Abbott, novelist and poet (born 1874)
- 1 September – Bernard O'Dowd, poet (born 1866)
- 14 December – Dora Wilcox, poet and playwright (born 1873)

Unknown Date

- Guy Innes, journalist (born 1879)

== See also ==
- 1953 in Australia
- 1953 in literature
- 1953 in poetry
- List of years in Australian literature
- List of years in literature
