= 1946 in Australian literature =

This article presents a list of the historical events and publications of Australian literature during 1946.

== Books ==
- James Aldridge – Of Many Men
- Herz Bergner – Between Sky and Sea
- Dora Birtles – The Overlanders : A Novel
- Capel Boake – The Twig is Bent
- Martin Boyd – Lucinda Brayford
- Errol Flynn – Showdown
- Miles Franklin – My Career Goes Bung
- Catherine Gaskin – This Other Eden
- Michael Innes
  - From London Far
  - What Happened at Hazelwood
- Katharine Susannah Prichard – The Roaring Nineties
- Christina Stead – Letty Fox: Her Luck
- Kylie Tennant – Lost Haven
- F. J. Thwaites – They Lived That Spring
- Arthur Upfield – The Devil's Steps

== Short stories ==
- Jon Cleary – These Small Glories
- Alan Marshall
  - "The Grey Kangaroo"
  - Tell Us About the Turkey, Jo : Short Stories
- Vance Palmer – "The Foal"
- Douglas Stewart – "The Three Jolly Foxes"
- Dal Stivens – The Courtship of Uncle Henry : A Collection of Tales and Stories

== Children's and Young Adult fiction ==
- Leslie Rees – The Story of Karrawingi the Emu

== Poetry ==
- Rosemary Dobson
  - "In My End is My Beginning"
  - "The Ship of Ice"
- Mary E. Fullerton – The Wonder and the Apple
- Dorothy Hewett – "Clancy and Dooley and Don Mcleod"
- James Macauley – Under Aldebaran
- George Mackaness – Poets of Australia: An Anthology of Australian Verse(compiled)
- J. S. Manifold
  - Selected Verse
  - "The Bunyip and the Whistling Kettle"
- John Shaw Neilson – "To the Red Lory"
- Will H. Ogilvie – From Sunset to Dawn
- Elizabeth Riddell – "The Letter"
- Douglas Stewart – The Dosser in Springtime
- Judith Wright
  - The Moving Image
  - "Woman to Child"
  - "Woman to Man"

== Drama ==
=== Radio ===
- Allison Ind – Australian Bride

=== Theatre ===
- Dymphna Cusack – Eternal Now : A Play in Three Acts
- Sumner Locke Elliott – The Invisible Circus : A Play in Three Acts
- Louis Esson – The Southern Cross and Other Plays
- Nevil Shute – Vinland the Good

== Biography ==
- Alec H. Chisholm – The Making of the Sentimental Bloke : A Sketch of the Remarkable Career of C.J. Dennis

== Awards and honours ==
Note: these awards were presented in the year in question.

=== Literary ===
Award	Author	Title	Publisher
ALS Gold Medal	Not awarded		

=== Children's and Young Adult ===
Award	Category	Author	Title	Publisher
Children's Book of the Year Award	Older Readers	Leslie Rees, illustrated by Walter Cunningham	The Story of Karrawingi the Emu	John Sands

== Births ==
A list, ordered by date of birth (and, if the date is either unspecified or repeated, ordered alphabetically by surname) of births in 1946 of Australian literary figures, authors of written works or literature-related individuals follows, including year of death.

- 4 February – Jean Bedford, novelist (born in Cambridge, England)(died 2025)
- 26 February – Gabrielle Lord, novelist
- 28 February – Leanne Frahm, sf short story writer (died 2025)
- 5 March – Mem Fox, writer for children
- 10 March – Peter Temple, novelist (born in South Africa)(died 2018)
- 14 May – Raimond Gaita, author
- 29 June – Sally Morrison, novelist and biographer
- 1 August – Michael Sharkey, poet
- 25 August – Shelton Lea, poet (died 2005)
- 5 September – Lily Brett, poet and novelist
- 17 October – Drusilla Modjeska, biographer and novelist

Unknown date

- Peter Robb, novelist
- Rod Usher, poet and novelist

== Deaths ==
A list, ordered by date of death (and, if the date is either unspecified or repeated, ordered alphabetically by surname) of deaths in 1946 of Australian literary figures, authors of written works or literature-related individuals follows, including year of birth.

- 23 February – Mary Eliza Fullerton, novelist (born 1868)
- 20 March – Henry Handel Richardson, novelist (born 1870)
- 18 November — Walter J. Turner, poet and playwright (born 1889)

Unknown date

- Harry Tighe, playwright and novelist (born 1877)

== See also ==
- 1946 in Australia
- 1946 in literature
- 1946 in poetry
- List of years in Australian literature
- List of years in literature
