= Baiamai's Never-Failing Stream =

1944 poem by William Hart-Smith

- by William Hart-Smith
- First published in: Meanjin Papers
- Country: Australia
- Language: English
- Publication date: Autumn 1944
- Lines: 8

"Baiamai's Never-Failing Stream" is a poem by Australian/New Zealand poet William Hart-Smith.

It was first published in Meanjin Papers on Autumn 1944, and later in the poet's collections and other Australian poetry anthologies.

== Analysis ==
In his commentary on the poem in 60 Classic Australian Poems Geoff Page called this poem "one of the high points of the Jindyworobak movement and one of the few examples where a non-Aboriginal writer has successfully caught at least a part of the Aboriginal cosmos." He went on to say that the poem "exists on two levels: as a convincing (and useful) insight from one worldview to another; and as a fine example of craftmanship in a form which many readers at the time considered to involve no craft at all."

== Further publications ==
After the poem's initial publication in Meanjin Papers it was reprinted as follows:

- Harvest by William Hart-Smith, Jindyworobak Publications, 1945
- A Book of Australian Verse edited by Judith Wright, Oxford University Press, 1956
- The Jindyworobaks edited by Brian Elliott, University of Queensland Press, 1979
- Anthology of Australian Religious Poetry edited by Les Murray, Collins Dove, 1986
- 60 Classic Australian Poems edited by Geoff Page, University of NSW Press, 2009
- The Puncher & Wattmann Anthology of Australian Poetry edited by John Leonard, Puncher & Wattmann, 2009

== See also ==
- 1944 in poetry
- 1944 in literature
- 1944 in Australian literature
- Australian literature
