= Legend (poem) =

1950 poem by Australian poet Judith Wright

- by Judith Wright
- Written: 1950
- First published in: The Bulletin
- Country: Australia
- Language: English
- Publication date: 13 December 1950
- Lines: 45

"Legend" (1950) is a poem by Australian poet Judith Wright.

It was originally published in The Bulletin on 13 December 1950, and was subsequently reprinted in the author's single-author collections and a number of Australian poetry anthologies.

== Synopsis ==
The poem tells the tale of an adventurous young boy who sets out one day with a rifle on his shoulder. At first he aims to conquer nature but as his journey progresses his arrogance fades and he becomes to appreciate the world around him. He finally returns home with a rainbow on his shoulder rather than a rifle.

== Critical reception ==
In her introduction to Wright's Collected Poems (1994), Judith Rodriguez noted that this poem is "a repurposing of old folk-tale tropes – gun, sword, evil-omened blackbird – hints at Wright’s burgeoning interest in myth and legend."

== Publication history ==
After the poem's initial publication in The Bulletin it was reprinted as follows:

- Australian Poetry 1951-1952 edited by Kenneth Mackenzie, Angus and Robertson, 1952
- Jindyworobak Anthology edited by William Hart-Smith and Gloria Rawlinson, 1952
- The Gateway by Judith Wright, Angus and Robertson, 1953
- New Song in an Old Land edited by Rex Ingamells, Longmans Green, 1954
- The Boomerang Book of Australian Poetry edited by Enid Moodie Heddle, Longmans Green, 1956
- A Book of Australian Verse edited by Judith Wright, Oxford University Press, 1956
- Five Senses : Selected Poems by Judith Wright, Angus and Robertson, 1963
- Judith Wright : Selected Poems by Judith Wright, Angus and Robertson, 1963
- Judith Wright : Collected Poems, 1942-1970 by Judith Wright, Angus and Robertson, 1971
- New Oxford Book of Australian Verse edited by Les Murray, Oxford University Press, 1986
- Anthology of Australian Religious Poetry edited by Les Murray, Collins Dove, 1986
- Peace and War : A Collection of Poems edited by Michael Harrison, 1989
- A Human Pattern : Selected Poems by Judith Wright, Angus and Robertson, 1990
- Collected Poems 1942-1985 by Judith Wright, Angus and Robertson, 1994

== See also ==
- 1950 in Australian literature
- 1950 in poetry
