= Emus =

Emus may refer to:

- Emus, large flightless birds
- Emus (beetle), a genus of staphylinid beetle
- "Emus (poem)", 1944 poem by Mary Eliza Fullerton
