= 1873 in Australian literature =

This article presents a list of the historical events and publications of Australian literature during 1873.

== Books ==
- James Bonwick
  - Mike Howe, the Bushranger of Van Diemen's Land
  - The Tasmanian Lily
- Edward Maitland – By and By: An Historical Romance of the Future
- Vincent Pyke – The Story of Wild Will Enderby
- Anthony Trollope
  - Harry Heathcote of Gangoil : A Tale of Australian Bush Life
  - Lady Anna

== Short stories ==
- Marcus Clarke – Holiday Peak and Other Tales

== Poetry ==
- Marcus Clarke – "The Song of Tigilau"
- John Dunmore Lang – Poems : Sacred and Secular : Written Chiefly at Sea, within the Last Half-Century
- John Boyle O'Reilly – Songs from the Southern Seas and Other Poems
- J. Brunton Stephens
  - "My Chinee Cook"
  - "My Other Chinee Cook"

== Births ==
A list, ordered by date of birth (and, if the date is either unspecified or repeated, ordered alphabetically by surname) of births in 1873 of Australian literary figures, authors of written works or literature-related individuals follows, including year of death.

- 15 August – Erle Cox, novelist and journalist (died 1950)
- 27 October – Henry Tate, poet (died 1926)
- 24 November – Dora Wilcox, poet and playwright (died 1953)
- 11 December – Tilly Aston, blind writer and teacher (died 1947)
- 18 December – Edith Joan Lyttleton, author (died 1945)

Unknown date

- Nancy Francis, poet, journalist and short story writer (died 1954)
- Gertrude Hart, novelist (died 1965)
- Leonora Polkinghorne, novelist and poet (died 1953)

== Deaths ==
A list, ordered by date of death (and, if the date is either unspecified or repeated, ordered alphabetically by surname) of deaths in 1873 of Australian literary figures, authors of written works or literature-related individuals follows, including year of birth.

- 19 November — Mary Theresa Vidal, Australia's first female novelist (born 1815)

== See also ==
- 1873 in Australia
- 1873 in literature
- 1873 in poetry
- List of years in Australian literature
- List of years in literature
