= South of My Days =

1945 poem by Australian poet Judith Wright

- by Judith Wright
- Written: 1945
- First published in: The Bulletin
- Country: Australia
- Language: English
- Publication date: 8 August 1945

"South of My Days" (1945) is a poem by Australian poet Judith Wright.

It was originally published in The Bulletin on 8 August 1945, and was subsequently reprinted in the author's single-author collections and a number of Australian poetry anthologies.

The poem depicts a landscape of desolation and isolation, both physical and emotional.

== Critical reception ==
The Oxford Companion to Australian Literature notes that this poem established Wright "as the poet of the New England countryside." The entry points out it reflects the countryside where Wright was born and that it also contains "fragments of stories from that countryside's pioneer past — drovers and bushrangers, desperate droughts and starving cattle, and the legendary coaches of Cobb & Co."

The Oxford Literary History of Australia stated that with this poem "Wright exceeds even the cultural confidence of other scions of squatting families, fusing an Australian landscape with her own past and with her own body."

== Publication history ==
After the poem's initial publication in The Bulletin it was reprinted as follows:

- Australian Poetry 1945 edited by Kenneth Slessor, 1946
- Poets of Australia : An Anthology of Australian Verse edited by George Mackaness, Angus & Robertson, 1946
- The Moving Image by Judith Wright, Meanjin Press, 1946
- New Song in an Old Land edited by Rex Ingamells, Longmans Green, 1948
- An Anthology of Australian Verse edited by George Mackaness, Angus & Robertson, 1952
- The Boomerang Book of Australian Poetry edited by Enid Moodie Heddle, Longmans Green, 1956
- New Land, New Language : An Anthology of Australian Verse edited by Judith Wright, Oxford University Press, 1957
- The Penguin Book of Australian Verse edited by John Thompson, Kenneth Slessor and R. G. Howarth, Penguin Books, 1958
- Five Senses : Selected Poems by Judith Wright, Angus and Robertson, 1963
- Judith Wright : Selected Poems by Judith Wright, Angus and Robertson, 1963
- Six Voices : Contemporary Australian Poets edited by Chris Wallace-Crabb, Angus and Robertson, 1963
- Modern Australian Verse edited by Douglas Stewart, Angus and Robertson, 1964
- Judith Wright : Collected Poems, 1942-1970 by Judith Wright, Angus and Robertson, 1971
- The Penguin Book of Australian Verse edited by Harry Heseltine, Penguin Books, 1972
- Australian Verse from 1805 : A Continuum edited by Geoffrey Dutton, 1976
- The Golden Apples of the Sun : Twentieth Century Australian Poetry edited by Chris Wallace-Crabbe, Melbourne University Press, 1980
- My Country : Australian Poetry and Short Stories, Two Hundred Years edited by Leonie Kramer, Lansdowne, 1985
- Two Centuries of Australian Poetry edited by Mark O’Connor, Oxford University Press, 1988
- A Human Pattern : Selected Poems by Judith Wright, Angus and Robertson, 1990
- A Treasury of Bush Verse edited by G. A. Wilkes, Angus and Robertson, 1991
- Two Centuries of Australian Poetry edited by Kathrine Bell, Gary Allen, 2007
- Grace and Other Poems by Judith Wright, Picaro Press, 2009
- Macquarie PEN Anthology of Australian Literature edited by Nicholas Jose, Kerryn Goldsworthy, Anita Heiss, David McCooey, Peter Minter, Nicole Moore, and Elizabeth Webby, Allen and Unwin, 2009
- Australian Poetry Since 1788 edited by Geoffrey Lehmann and Robert Gray, University of NSW Press, 2011

== See also ==
- 1945 in Australian literature
- 1945 in poetry

== Notes ==
The full text of the poem is also available at the "All Poetry" website.
