= Pacific Sea =

Collected poems by Nan McDonald

- Author: Nan McDonald
- Language: English
- Genre: Poetry collection
- Publisher: Angus & Robertson
- Publication date: 1947
- Publication place: Australia
- Media type: Print
- Pages: 71pp
- Preceded by: –
- Followed by: The Lonely Fire

Pacific Sea (1947) is a collection of poems by Australian author Nan McDonald. It won the inaugural Grace Leven Prize for Poetry in 1947.

The collection consists of 32 poems by the author with the bulk of these having been previously published in magazines such as The Bulletin, Southerly, and Meanjin.

== Contents ==
- "The Ship"
- "The White Eagle"
- "South Coast Idyll"
- "The Stormbird"
- "Good Friday"
- "The Moon is Dark"
- "Louise"
- "The Waking"
- "Morning Prayer"
- "The Orchard"
- "Skylark Hill"
- "Swamp Country"
- "Transmigration"
- "Candles"
- "The Mountain Road : Crete, 1941"
- "The Night was Made for Loving"
- "King Joshua is Dead"
- "Full Moon"
- "Alison Hunt"
- "False Spring, 1942"
- "Cool Change"
- "Dream and Memory"
- "The Lightship"
- "June Saturday"
- "The Dead Currawong"
- "The White Moment"
- "The Widow"
- "Sunday Evening"
- "Died of Illness, P.O.W. Camp"
- "The Tollgate Islands"
- "The Haunted House"
- "Pacific Sea"

== Critical reception ==
While acknowledging that McDonald was not the best poet in Australia at that time – choosing Judith Wright for that title – a reviewer in The Sydney Morning Herald in 1948 stated: "Nan McDonald's verse is essentially Australian. There are landscapes and seascapes which could be written only by one saturated in the spirit of the continent. The strength and sunshine of her long poem, "Pacific Sea" - which treats both ocean and outback - could scarcely have come from another country. Such poems as "Candles," "The White Moment," "The Light Ship," and "The Waking" are the equal of the best of the verse the overseas writers export and far better than the bulk of it."

Another reviewer in The Advertiser (Adelaide) was also impressed with the work: "Miss McDonald is a poet who requires a broadly spread canvas. She possesses a sensitive imagination and a fine sense of natural things, and her descriptions are large and generous."

== See also ==
- 1947 in Australian literature
- 1947 in poetry
