= The Gateway (poetry collection) =

Poetry collection by Judith Wright

- Author: Judith Wright
- Language: English
- Publisher: Angus and Robertson
- Publication date: 1953
- Publication place: Australia
- Media type: Print (hardback)
- Pages: 63p
- Preceded by: Woman to Man
- Followed by: The Two Fires

The Gateway (1953) is the third collection of poetry by Australian poet Judith Wright.

The collection consists of 57 poems, some with their original publication in this book, and some of which were had been previously published in magazines such as The Age, Southerly, The Bulletin, and various Australian poetry collections.

== Contents ==
- "Dark Gift"
- "The Grave"
- "The Fire"
- "The Stone"
- "The Cedars"
- "Train Journey"
- "Fairytale"
- "Myth"
- "The Play"
- "The Journey"
- "Eroded Hills"
- "Old House"
- "Remembered Drought"
- "Flood Year"
- "Old Man"
- "Botanical Gardens"
- "Song for a Drowning Sailor"
- "Girl and Death"
- "Two Songs of Mad Tom : I"
- "Two Songs of Mad Tom : II"
- "Birds"
- "Lion"
- "The Lory"
- "The Orange-Tree"
- "Sandy Swamp"
- "Phaius Orchid"
- "Rain at Night"
- "Eden"
- "Song for Winter"
- "Sonnet for Christmas"
- "The Pool and the Star"
- "All Things Conspire"
- "Our Love is So Natural"
- "Song for Easter"
- "The Flame-Tree"
- "Song"
- "Two Hundred Miles"
- "Legend"
- "Nursery Rhyme for a Seventh Son"
- "The Cicadas"
- "Ishtar"
- "The Promised One"
- "A Song to Sing You"
- "Waiting Ward"
- "The Watcher"
- "Full Moon Rhyme"
- "To a Child"
- "Two Songs for the World's End : I"
- "Two Songs for the World's End : II"
- "Drought"
- "Unknown Water"
- "Walker in Darkness"
- "The Ancestors"
- "The Forest Path"
- "The Lost Man"
- "The Traveller and the Angel"
- "The Gateway"

== Critical reception ==
In a short review of three poetry collections a reviewer in The Advertiser stated: "Judith Wright is vitally concerned with the continuity of living experience, and, with few exceptions, her themes are interrelated in her anxiety to seek the true answer to the mystery of existence."

The Age newspaper commented that this collection signals Wright's "advance to a new kind of symbolism, at the moment perhaps too much reliant on Blake, in which she seeks to embody her view of cosmic beauty and terror."

== See also ==
- 1953 in literature
- 1953 in Australian literature
