= The Witch's Thorn =

1951 novel by Ruth Park

- First edition
- Author: Ruth Park
- Language: English
- Genre: Fiction
- Publisher: Angus and Robertson
- Publication date: 1951
- Publication place: Australia
- Media type: Print
- Pages: 220 pp
- Preceded by: Poor Man's Orange
- Followed by: A Power of Roses

The Witch's Thorn (1951) is a novel by Australian author Ruth Park.

== Plot outline ==
The novel is set in the fictional New Zealand North Island town of Te Kana. After the disappearance of her consumptive mother and the death of her beloved grandamother, Bethell Jury is adopted by her Aunt Amy whose husband is the local grocer and whose son is an unpleasant lout.

== Critical reception ==
The initial press reaction to this novel was not good: The Advertiser (Adelaide) found "There is wonderful material in this for a colorful novel of New Zealand life, but Ruth Park resolutely sticks to the horror and the sordidness whose sensational exploitation marred her Sydney novels"; The Examiner (Launceston) was blunt in stating that " it is inspired by cruelty, disease, despair, blasphemy and death"; and The Sydney Morning Herald noted that The New York Times called it "unplotted and nervously episodic".

Possibly in a sort of response to these views, Kirkus Reviews noted: "There's an unblinking realization of the rough and tumble of bare subsistence, of the good in the bad and the worst in the best of us that gives this a raw insistence which may repel or attract."

== See also ==
- 1951 in Australian literature

== Notes ==
Dedication: For Charles Hutchinson: unforgotten.
