= Bullocky (Wright poem) =

1944 poem by Australian poet Judith Wright

- by Judith Wright
- First published in: The Bulletin
- Country: Australia
- Language: English
- Publication date: 27 September 1944

"Bullocky" (1944) is a poem by Australian poet Judith Wright.

It was originally published in The Bulletin on 27 September 1944, and was subsequently reprinted in the author's single-author collections and a number of Australian poetry anthologies.

The Oxford Companion to Australian Literature states the poem "links the bullock driver in his pioneer role of unlocking the land with Moses, leading his people into the promised land...The poem indicates that the continuing fruitfulness and progress of the coiuntry depend upon the past as much as the present; that Australia of the future will be shaped by its traditions and history."

== Critical reception ==
In reviewing Modern Australian Poetry, edited by H. M. Green, in The Advocate (Melbourne) reviewer "L.M." called the poem "a splendid example of [Wright's] mastery over words and vigorous, unusual imagery."

Critic "E.M.", writing in The Age (Melbourne) about Wright's poetry, stated that the poem "could only have been written by someone who had seen the flickering firelight on a ribbon gum or a candlebark—by one who knew many nights in the bush...And the poem is ourselves, our country, our life. It is all the memories of autumn camping, and yet it is the past, our fathers' memories too, a mature evocation of the time when the life of the bush moved to a ballad rhythm."

== Publication history ==
After the poem's initial publication in The Bulletin magazine in 1944 it was reprinted as follows:

- Australian Poetry 1944 selected by R. G. Howarth, Angus and Robertson, 1945
- Poets of Australia : An Anthology of Australian Verse edited by George Mackaness, Angus and Robertson, 1946
- The Moving Image by Judith Wright, Meanjin Press, 1946
- Modern Australian Poetry edited by H. M. Green, Melbourne University Press, 1952
- An Anthology of Australian Verse edited by George Mackaness, Angus & Robertson, 1952
- A Book of Australian Verse edited by Judith Wright, Oxford University Press, 1956
- New Land, New Language : An Anthology of Australian Verse edited by Judith Wright, Oxford University Press, 1957
- The Penguin Book of Australian Verse edited by John Thompson, Kenneth Slessor and R. G. Howarth, Penguin Books, 1958
- Five Senses : Selected Poems by Judith Wright, Angus and Robertson, 1963
- Judith Wright : Selected Poems by Judith Wright, Angus and Robertson, 1963
- Six Voices : Contemporary Australian Poets edited by Chris Wallace-Crabbe, Angus and Robertson, 1963
- Modern Australian Verse edited by Douglas Stewart, Angus and Robertson, 1964
- Silence Into Song : An Anthology of Australian Verse edited by Clifford O'Brien, Rigby, 1968
- A Book of Australian Verse edited by Judith Wright, Oxford University Press, 1968
- Judith Wright : Collected Poems, 1942-1970 by Judith Wright, Angus and Robertson, 1971
- The Penguin Book of Australian Verse edited by Harry Heseltine, Penguin Books, 1972
- The Collins Book of Australian Poetry edited by Rodney Hall, Collins, 1981
- Cross-Country : A Book of Australian Verse edited by John Barnes and Brian MacFarlane, Heinemann, 1984
- The Illustrated Treasury of Australian Verse edited by Beatrice Davis, Nelson, 1984
- A Human Pattern : Selected Poems by Judith Wright, Angus and Robertson, 1990
- Two Centuries of Australian Poetry edited by Kathrine Bell, Gary Allen, 2007
- 100 Australian Poems You Need to Know edited by Jamie Grant, Hardie Grant, 2008
- Grace and Other Poems by Judith Wright, Picaro Press, 2009

== See also ==
- 1944 in Australian literature
- 1944 in poetry
