= The Surfer (poem) =

1945 poem by Australian poet Judith Wright

- by Judith Wright
- Written: 1945
- First published in: The Bulletin
- Country: Australia
- Language: English
- Publication date: 21 March 1945

"The Surfer" (1945) is a poem by Australian poet Judith Wright.

It was originally published in The Bulletin on 21 March 1945, and was subsequently reprinted in the author's single-author collections and a number of Australian poetry anthologies.

The poet observes a surfer at sea and compares him, in the water, with the gulls in the air. But as night falls he needs to be mindful of the sea's power and danger.

== Critical reception ==
Reviewing the poet's collection A Human Pattern : Selected Poems for The Canberra Times Alan Gould noted that "Like some of Arthur Boyd's paintings, the forces on her canvas are elemental from which individual creatures like the stallion (in 'Blue Arab'), the surfer, the snake, leap into metaphysical focus."

In his essay "Adapted for land : a lungfish writes the sea", in the Plumwood Mountain Journal, Brook Emery notes that Wright adopts the "position of observer' in this poem, and while it "comes closest to catching the experience of being in the sea" its use of emotions "feel like imposed abstractions rather than experiences which grow from the poem". Emery notes a liking for the poem even though it bears the signs of "poem-making".

== Publication history ==
After the poem's initial publication in The Bulletin it was reprinted as follows:

- The Moving Image by Judith Wright, Meanjin Press, 1946
- The Boomerang Book of Australian Poetry edited by Enid Moodie Heddle, Longmans Green, 1956
- Five Senses : Selected Poems by Judith Wright, Angus and Robertson, 1963
- Songs for All Seasons : 100 Poems for Young People edited by Rosemary Dobson, Angus and Robertson, 1967
- Judith Wright : Collected Poems, 1942-1970 by Judith Wright, Angus and Robertson, 1971
- The Land's Meaning edited by L. M. Hannan and B. A. Breen, Macmillan, 1973
- This World : An Anthology of Poetry for Young People edited by M. M. Flynn and J. Groom, Pergamon Press, 1976
- Poetry Speaks edited by Leone Peguero, Heinemann Education Australia, 1982
- A Human Pattern : Selected Poems by Judith Wright, Angus and Robertson, 1990
- Collected Poems 1942-1985 by Judith Wright, Angus and Robertson, 1990
- Macquarie PEN Anthology of Australian Literature edited by Nicholas Jose, Kerryn Goldsworthy, Anita Heiss, David McCooey, Peter Minter, Nicole Moore, and Elizabeth Webby, Allen and Unwin, 2009

== See also ==
- 1945 in Australian literature
- 1945 in poetry
