= Roland Robinson Literary Award =

Former literary award

The Roland Robinson Literary Award was created in memory of the Australian poet, Roland Robinson, who died in 1992. It was awarded from 1993 to 2008.

The prize was run by the City of Lake Macquarie and was awarded to both poetry and short stories in alternating years. It had a first prize of A$500.

== Winners ==
- 1993: Marion Steed Appearances
- 1994: Marion Steed The Codependent’s Revenge
- 1995: Jean Kent, A Meaningful Life
- 1996: Richard Kelly Tipping
- 1997: Pam Jeffery, James Dean and Old Dreams
- 1998: David Kirkby, Junga Jimi
- 1999: David Kirkby, Waves
- 2000: Judy Johnson, Bell and Norman Talbot, Asks the Storyteller
- 2001: Josh Davis, Chaos Theory
- 2002: Jan Iwaszkiewicz, Letter from Lone Pine
- 2003: Julie Simpson, Bella is Knitting Iced Vo Vos
- 2004: Christopher Brown Escarpment
- 2005: Wendy Alexander, Fifth Branch Down
- 2006: Andrew Slattery, The Westerly
- 2007: Ryan O'Neil, A Speeding Bullet
- 2008: Kylie Rose, Bluebottles
