= Remittance Man (poem) =

Poem by Judith Wright

- by Judith Wright
- Country: Australia
- Language: English
- Publisher: The Bulletin, 15 March 1944
- Publication date: 1944

"Remittance Man" is a poem by Australian poet Judith Wright.

It was first published in The Bulletin on 15 March 1944 and later in several of the author's poetry collections and a number of other Australian poetry anthologies.

== Outline ==
The "remittance man" of the title has been disgraced in Britain and sent by his family to make a new life in Australia. There he would receive a regular payment from the family back home. This will be enough to feed him though he will have to keep seeking casual employment to ensure he lives in some sort of comfort.

== Critical reception ==
While reviewing the poet's collection A Human Pattern : Selected Poems critic Beverley Brahic commented that "As Heaney reveals rural Northern Ireland to us, so Wright trains her refreshingly flinty eye on the settlers of rural Australia. 'Remittance Man' is not Heaneyesque in its irony or in its way of telling rather than evoking with sensuous detail and rich music, but it too delineates the contours of life in a place most people who aren't natives of that place don't think much about. These poems with their laconic jibes have an anvil ring of truth".

In his commentary on the poem in 60 Classic Australian Poems Geoff Page noted "At one level it is simply a character sketch of someone she knew about. At another, it is a microcosm of how British 'settlers' came to terms emotionally with Australian landscapes."

== Further publications ==
After its initial publication in The Bulletin in 1944, the poem was reprinted as follows:

- The Moving Image by Judith Wright, Meanjin Press, 1946
- Five Senses : Selected Poems by Judith Wright, Angus and Robertson, 1963
- Judith Wright : Selected Poems by Judith Wright, Angus and Robertson, 1963
- Silence Into Song : An Anthology of Australian Verse edited by Clifford O'Brien, Rigby, 1968
- Australian Kaleidoscope edited by Barbara Ker Wilson, Collins, 1968
- Judith Wright : Collected Poems 1942-1970 by Judith Wright, Angus and Robertson, 1971
- A Human Pattern : Selected Poems by Judith Wright, Angus and Robertson, 1990
- A Treasury of Bush Verse edited by G. A. Wilkes, Angus and Robertson, 1991
- Collected Poems 1942-1985 by Judith Wright, Angus and Robertson, 1994
- 80 Great Poems from Chaucer to Now edited by Geoff Page, University of NSW Press, 2006
- 60 Classic Australian Poems edited by Geoff Page, University of NSW Press, 2009

== See also ==
- 1944 in poetry
- 1944 in literature
- 1944 in Australian literature
- Australian literature
