= Tumult of the Swans =

1953 poetry collection by Roland Robinson

- Author: Roland Robinson
- Language: English
- Genre: poetry
- Publisher: Edwards and Shaw, Sydney
- Publication date: 1953
- Publication place: Australia
- Media type: Print
- Pages: 50pp
- Preceded by: Language of the Sands : Poems
- Followed by: Deep Well

Tumult of the Swans (1953) is the third poetry collection by Australian poet Roland Robinson. It won the Grace Leven Prize for Poetry in 1953.

The collection consists of 3 poems, with only one of these - "Deep Well" - being a reprint, the other two are published in this collection for the first time.

== Contents ==
- "The Coal"
- "Deep Well"
- "Tumult of the Swans"

== See also ==
- 1953 in Australian literature
- 1953 in poetry

== Notes ==
Dedication: "To Lisa/ I have desired to go/ Where springs not fail."

== Critical reception ==
A reviewer in The Sydney Morning Herald wrote: "Once again we are presented with the familiar figure of the wandering poet, encountered earlier in Roland Robinson's first volume of poetry, Language of the Sand. But this author portrays his wandering poet with a refreshing difference. He is no stock puppet created by romantic imagination. Disguised as an Australian swagman, his restless desire to feel 'the poet's coal of pain burn and brand his brow' combines quite naturally with a genuine swagman's zest for wandering itself." (Note: the reviewer here states that this is the "second" volume of Robinson's verse, when it is actually the third.)

The Age reviewer also found some merit in the work: "Mr. Robinson is neither a new poet nor a particularly important one. He has, however, done good work in Australian poetry by inspiring, that small group of zealots known as the Lyre-Bird Writers, and by consistently turning out poems which are neat, compact, and intelligible. His work is not in any sense brilliant, but one of its graces lies in the fact that it does not pretend to be."

== Awards ==
- 1953 - winner Grace Leven Prize for Poetry
