= The Moving Image (poetry collection) =

1946 poetry collection by Judith Wright

- Author: Judith Wright
- Language: English
- Genre: Poetry collection
- Publisher: Meanjin Press
- Publication date: 1946
- Publication place: Australia
- Media type: Print
- Pages: 33 pp.

The Moving Image is a collection of poems by Australian poet Judith Wright, published by Meanjin Press in 1946.

The collection contains 24 poems from a variety of sources, such as Poetry, The Bulletin, and Meanjin, with some being published here for the first time.

== Contents ==
- "The Moving Image"
- "The Madmen Singing"
- "Northern River"
- "The Company of Lovers"
- "Blue Arab"
- "Bora Ring"
- "Trapped Dingo"
- "Waiting"
- "To A.H., New Year 1943"
- "Remittance Man"
- "Soldier's Farm"
- "The Trains"
- "The Idler"
- "Country Town"
- "The Hawthorn Hedge"
- "Nigger's Leap : New England"
- "Sonnet"
- "Bullocky"
- "Brother and Sisters"
- "Half-Caste Girl"
- "South of My Days"
- "The Surfer"
- "For New England"
- "Dust"

== Critical reception ==
Reviewing the collection for The Bulletin Douglas Stewart noted the "comparative smallness of output" and "a certain lack of joy, spontaneity and simplicity; and, in consequence, an impression of seriousness and, sometimes, strain." But he did conclude that a number of the poems were "expressing the writer’s own richly feminine genius in the imagery of blossoming trees—these promise anything; everything; the world."

A writer in The Age found the collection to be "a sign of a stirring in present-day poetry", noting the poet's voice to be "clear, distinguished, genuine and graceful." They concluded that "she achieves the intensity of feeling, the sureness of phrase, the sensitive pictorial image and the genuine, vision illuminating the picture with meaning, which make poetry."

== See also ==
- 1946 in Australian literature
