= The Wonder and the Apple =

1946 poetry collection by Mary E. Fullerton

- Author: Mary E. Fullerton
- Language: English
- Genre: Poetry collection
- Publisher: Angus & Robertson
- Publication date: 1946
- Publication place: Australia
- Media type: Print
- Pages: 49 pp.

The Wonder and the Apple is a collection of poetry by Australian writer Mary E. Fullerton, published by Angus and Robertson in 1946.

The collection was originally published as by the author's pseudonym "E.". This was eventually disclosed as being a penname of Mary E. Fullerton by her friend Miles Franklin.

It contains 76 poems from a variety of sources, with the bulk of the poems being published here for the first time.

== Contents ==
- "Emus"
- "The Artist"
- "Living"
- "Dread"
- "Two Laws"
- "Sorrow"
- "Turnip"
- "Earth"
- "Female Eternal"
- "Illusion"
- "Thrush After Snow"
- "Severance"
- "Isolation"
- "Roofs"
- "Holiday"
- "Faith Speaks"
- "The Scarecrow"
- "Martyr"
- "Wheat"
- "Stars"
- "The Farmer"
- "The Sea Swallows Gold"
- "Ninety"
- "Indomitable"
- "Argument"
- "Delight"
- "Soul in Gehenna"
- "Cradle"
- "Impregnable"
- "Body and Soul"
- "A Man's Sliding Mood"
- "Past"
- "Killed in Action"
- "Windows"
- "Ocean"
- "Apple, The Rose of Fruits"
- "Aims"
- "Sahara"
- "Might"
- "Reincarnation"
- "Squirrel"
- "Two Worlds"
- "The Show"
- "The Heart's Not Yet a Neighbour"
- "The Bridges"
- "Freedom"
- "Inspiration"
- "Withdrawal"
- "The Dreamer Speaks"
- "Gamut"
- "Question"
- "Man"
- "Space"
- "Interlude"
- "Durable"
- "Treasury"
- "Threads"
- "Impartiality"
- "Withdrawn"
- "It is a Direful Thing"
- "I Saw"
- "Impermanent"
- "Balance"
- "Stupidity"
- "Wisdom"
- "The Sceptic Poet"
- "Reaction"
- "Acceptance"
- "Extremes"
- "Retrospect"
- "Closed Eyes"
- "Limited Monarch"
- "To the Hospital"
- "Face"
- "Conscience"
- "Suspense"

== Critical reception ==
After stating that the collection is "not major poetry, which is concerned with terror and delight", a reviewer in The Bulletin went on to note that it "has a quality rare in contemporary poetry; it is good company–the work of a mind mature, humorous, tolerant, and alert".

== See also ==
- 1946 in Australian literature
