= Woman to Child =

1946 poem by Australian poet Judith Wright

- by Judith Wright
- Written: 1946
- First published in: Meanjin Papers vol. 5 no. 1 [Autumn] 1946
- Country: Australia
- Language: English
- Publication date: Autumn 1946

"Woman to Child" (1946) is a poem by Australian poet Judith Wright.

It was originally published in Meanjin Papers in Autumn 1946, and was subsequently reprinted in the author's single-author collections and a number of Australian poetry anthologies.

== Synopsis ==
The poem continues Wright's examination of a woman's role as mother. Here she talks directly to the child who she has helped create but who, in time, will "escape and not escape."

== Critical reception ==
In her 1995 critical discussion of the work of Judith Wright for Oxford University Press Jennifer Strauss noted: "The imagery of the poem virtually projects the mother as Creator of the universe – but in a way that mirrors the paradox of the child as 'the maker and the made' in "Woman to Man", because it is the child who makes this Maker of its mother."

In her commentary on the poem in Australian Classics : Fifty Great Writers and Their Celebrated Works Jane Gleeson-White called this poem "powerful and taboo-breaking". She continued: "The poem forcefully captures in Wright's lucid, ecstatic images and sure rhythms the mystery of this [pregnancy] and this unique love."

== Publication history ==
After the poem's initial publication in Meanjin Papers in 1946 it was reprinted as follows:

- Voices : A Quarterly of Poetry no. 133, Spring 1948
- Woman to Man by Judith Wright, Angus and Robertson, 1949
- Five Senses: Selected Poems by Judith Wright, Angus and Robertson, 1963
- Judith Wright : Selected Poems by Judith Wright, Angus and Robertson, 1963
- Six Voices: Contemporary Australian Poets edited by Chris Wallace-Crabbe, Angus and Robertson, 1963
- On Native Grounds : Australian Writing from Meanjin Quarterly edited by C. B. Christesen, Angus and Robertson, 1967
- Poetry from Australia : Judith Wright, William Hart-Smith, Randolph Stow edited by Howard Sergeant, Pergamon Press, 1969
- Judith Wright : Collected Poems, 1942-1970 by Judith Wright, Angus and Robertson, 1971
- Judith Wright : Collected Poems 1942-1970 by Judith Wright, Angus and Robertson, 1971
- The Penguin Book of Women Poets edited by Carol Cosman, Joan Keefe, and Kathleen Weaver, Penguin Books, 1978
- Cross-Country : A Book of Australian Verse edited by John Barnes and Brian MacFarlane, Heinemann, 1984
- Two Centuries of Australian Poetry edited by Mark O’Connor, Oxford University Press, 1988
- Five Senses: Selected Poems by Judith Wright, Angus and Robertson, 1989
- A Human Pattern : Selected Poems by Judith Wright, Angus and Robertson, 1990
- Collected Poems 1942-1985 by Judith Wright, Angus and Robertson, 1994
- Australian Verse : An Oxford Anthology edited by John Leonard, Oxford University Press, 1998
- Poems for All Occasions edited by Ron Pretty, Five Islands Press, 2002
- Grace and Other Poems by Judith Wright, Picaro Press, 2009
- Motherlode : Australian Women's Poetry 1986 - 2008 edited by Jennifer Harrison and Kate Waterhouse, Puncher and Wattmann, 2009
- The Puncher & Wattmann Anthology of Australian Poetry edited by John Leonard, Puncher & Wattmann, 2009
- Hook and Eye : A Selection of Poems edited by Judith Beveridge, George Braziller, 2014
- Love is Strong as Death edited by Paul Kelly, Hamish Hamilton, 2019

== See also ==
- "Woman to Man" by Judith Wright, 1946
- 1946 in Australian literature
- 1946 in poetry
