= Jindyworobak Movement =

Australian literary movement

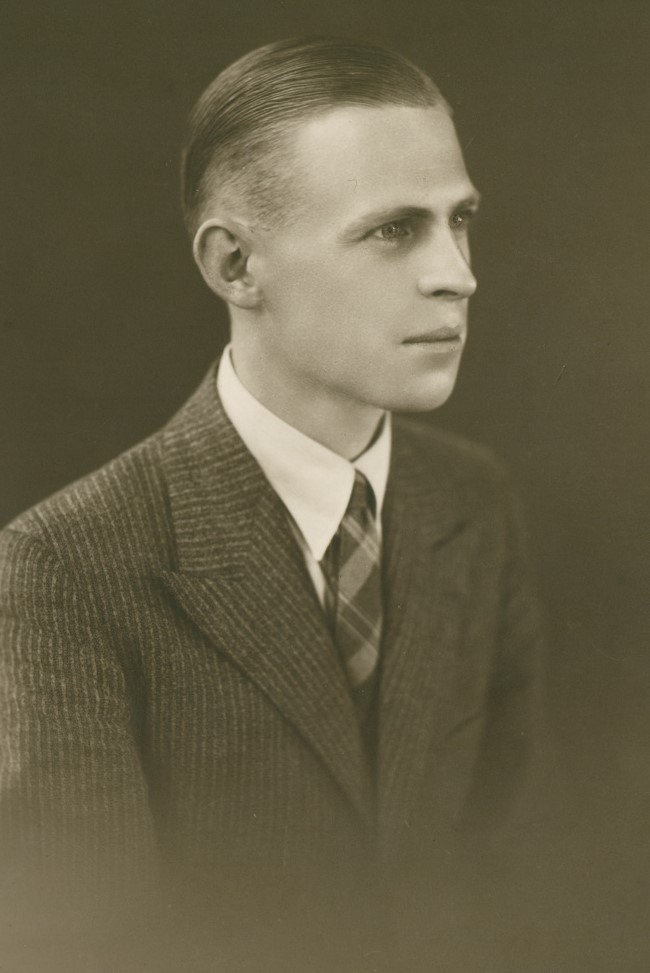
Rex Ingamells is generally considered the founder of the Jindyworobak Movement.

The Jindyworobak Movement was an Australian literary movement of the 1930s and 1940s whose members, mostly poets, sought to contribute to a uniquely Australian culture through the integration of Indigenous Australian subjects, language and mythology. The movement's stated aim was to "free Australian art from whatever alien influences trammel it" and create works based on an engagement with the Australian landscape and an "understanding of Australia's history and traditions, primeval, colonial and modern".

The movement began in Adelaide, South Australia, in 1937, when Rex Ingamells and other poets founded the Jindyworobak Club. Ingamells outlined the movement's aims in an address entitled On Environmental Values (1937). "Jindyworobak" comes from the Woiwurrung language, formerly spoken around modern-day Melbourne, meaning "to join" or "to annex". It was used by James Devaney in his 1929 book The Vanished Tribes, in which he claims to have sourced it from a 19th-century vocabulary. Ingamells is said to have chosen the word due to its outlandish and symbolic qualities. The name was sometimes shortened to "Jindy", and "Jindys" came to refer to members of the group, which included Nancy Cato, Ian Mudie and Roland Robinson.

The Jindyworobaks found inspiration in the Australian bush ballad tradition, Kangaroo (1928) by D. H. Lawrence and P. R. Stephensen's The Foundations of Culture in Australia (1936), and shared a vision similar to that of some of their contemporaries in the arts, such as author Xavier Herbert, artist Margaret Preston and composer John Antill. However, the movement also attracted criticism for being culturally insular and overtly nationalist, and has more recently been described as racist in appropriating Indigenous culture. The Jindyworobak Anthology was published annually from 1938 to 1953, and the Jindyworobak Review (1948) collected the first ten years of this publication. An extensive history of the movement, The Jindyworobaks, was published in 1979.

== Origins and aims ==
Starting off as a literary club in Adelaide, South Australia in 1938, the Jindyworobak movement was supported by many Australian artists, poets, and writers. Many were fascinated by Indigenous Australian culture and the Outback, and desired to improve the white Australian's understanding and appreciation of them. Other features came into play, among them white Australia's increasing alienation from its European origins; the Depression of the 1930s which recalled the economic troubles of the end of the 19th century; an increasingly urban or suburban Australian population alienated from the wild Australia of the Outback etc.; the First World War and the coming of World War II and also the coming of early mass market media in the form of the radio, recordings, newspapers and magazines. Sense of place was particularly important to the Jindyworobak movement.

Ingamells produced Colonial Culture as a prose manifesto of the movement, "in response to L. F. Giblin's urging that poets in Australia should portray Australian nature and people as they are in Australia, not with the 'European' gaze." and shortly after the first Jindyworobak Anthology came out.

In 1941, the poet and critic A. D. Hope ridiculed the Jindyworobaks as "the Boy Scout school of poetry", a comment for which he apologised in Native Companions in 1975 saying "some amends are due, I think, to these Jindyworobaks". Others such as R. H. Morrison derided "Jindyworobackwardness". Hal Porter wrote of meeting Rex Ingamells who he said "buys me a porter gaff and tries to persuade me to be a Jindyworobak - that is, a poet who thinks that words from the minute vocabulary of the earth's most primitive race must be used to express Australia".

Although "Jindies" concentrated on Australian culture, not all were of Australian origin—for example, William Hart-Smith, who is sometimes connected to the movement, was born in England, and spent most of his life in New Zealand after a decade (1936–1946) in Australia.

Anthologies of Jindyworobak material were produced until 1953.

== Influence and aftermath ==
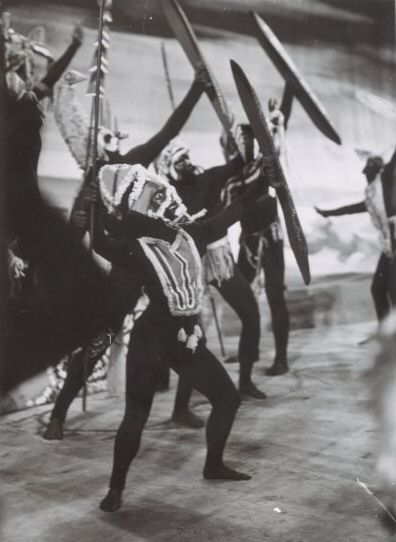
John Antill's 1936–46 ballet score Corroboree typifies the goals of the Jindyworobak Movement.

Arguably, the movement failed to make a lasting impression, and its erosion signalled the arrival of modernist painting in Australia, as well as jazz. No Indigenous Australians were members of the movement, but it did indirectly spur commercial interest in Indigenous Australian art.

Judith Wright wrote in Because I was Invited in 1975 that the movement had succeeded in bringing poetry into the public arena:

"One thing the movement did achieve was to make verse a subject of debate and argument. Opposition movements sprang up, and brought into the quarrel most practising poets of any stature. The Jindyworobak's tenets were discussed, and their more extravagant aspects such as recourse to 'Aboriginality' was ridiculed, even in the daily newspapers (which at that time were scarcely arenas for literary debate)."

Also, many of Australian literature's elder statespeople, some still living today, got their breaks through the Jindyworobak movement.

Brian Matthews wrote during the 1980s that:

"When Ingamells looked over the poetry scene from the standpoint of, say, 1937 – which he delivered his address On Environmental Values to the English Association in Adelaide – he saw very little poetry which satisfied the requirement of Australian inspiration, Australian content and imagery, and when Max Harris surveyed the same scene at the start of the new decade, he saw the burgeoning Jindyworobaks and not much else – nothing that seemed to have much connection with or awareness of the cultural world beyond the antipodes. And by and large, they were both right." (excerpt from Literature and Conflict)

Ackland argues in The Cambridge Companion to Australian Literature that the movement "reactualised debate on Indigenous culture, and promoted local talent in its annual anthologies".

Leading Australian poet Les Murray has sympathised with the Jindyworobaks' aims, and half-jokingly described himself as "the last of the Jindyworobaks". The attitude to Australia presented in Eleanor Dark's 1941 novel The Timeless Land has been described as very similar to that of the Jindyworobaks. The movement's lingering influence has also been identified in the poetry of Peter Porter, as well as Patrick White's Voss (1957) and Randolph Stow's To the Islands (1958). In Australian cinema, director Charles Chauvel's vision of Australia, presented in films such as Jedda (1955), has been compared to that of the Jindyworobaks.

Musicologist Roger Covell, writing about composer Clive Douglas in 1967, said "if there ever was a musical Jindyworobak, it has been Clive Douglas". John Antill has been described as another "Jindyworobak composer", particularly for his ballet Corroboree. In the 1980s, mainstream rock bands such as Midnight Oil, Goanna and Gondwanaland created Aboriginal-inspired music, echoing the efforts of the Jindyworobaks.

== Jindoworobaks and Aboriginality ==
A wireegun, a clever-feller, sings
That tree. He hums a song, a Mapooram,
A song to close things up, or bring things out
A song to bring a girl, a woman from that tree

— from "Mapooram", a poem by Roland Robinson, based on a traditional story related to him by a Wongaibon man

The Australian literary historian Brian Clunes Ross has written on one of the common criticisms of the Jindyworobaks, one that has persisted through the decades, through people of radically different political stripes, namely that of the Jindyworobaks' relationship with Indigenous Australians:

"Another poet, Ian Mudie in The Australian Dream (1943), revealed the delusory quality of the nationalist perception of Australia through its refusal to take into account the destruction of the natural environment and of Aboriginal culture… the Jindyworobaks… [were] often misrepresented by critics who claimed that the movement aimed to base Australian culture on Aboriginal culture. The Jindyworobaks were interested in Aborigines, and if white Australians are now able to recognise the grim impact of their civilisation on the Aboriginal inhabitants of the country, the Jindyworobaks are partly responsible…the Jindyworobaks… wanted to achieve a harmonious relationship between culture and the environment, and realised that Aboriginal culture embodied it. This was an example from which they could learn, not by imitation, but by coming to understand and accept the conditions which the environment imposes on them." (Australian Literature and Australian Culture)

Ivor Indyk has suggested that the Jindyworobaks were looking for a kind of pastoral poetry, harking back to an Arcadian idyll which was removed from the early pioneer period, back to the pre-colonisation era. He claims that "they overlooked the fact that Australian novelists have been there before them", but that unlike the Greek original this Australian "Arcadia" is not full of dryads, fauns and happy shepherds but is "haunted and usually overwhelmed by the spectres of death and dispossession", i.e. the atrocities, betrayal and misunderstandings of white contact with the natives. He also says of Judith Wright that she is "oppressed by feelings of 'arrogant guilt'. Guilt, as a burden of white history, is felt again in the division between the settlers and the land itself, despoiled by greed and incomprehension", in spite of her trying to inaugurate a "white dreaming", while the landscapes of Ingamells are:

"aflame with energy, but they are also uninhabited, save for the ghostly remnants of Aboriginal tribes, and more frequently, the cockatoos and parakeets whose bright colours and raucous cries express both the power and the alien character of the land. There is little that is really social or cultural about this use of an Aboriginal perspective, and no real sense of history."

It is thus arguable in certain cases whether the poetry is aiming at an indigenous consciousness in whites or possession of the land, which the Indigenous Australians are seen as being in close contact with.

The greatest indigenous influence on the Jindyworobaks was literature which had been taken down by white folklorists and anthropologists. Written, as opposed to transcribed, indigenous literature did not appear in print until the 1920s when David Unaipon, a Christian from Point McLeay mission, South Australia, published a large body of work. Unaipon was publishing into the 1950s, by which time the Jindyworobaks were in decline. Unaipon was the sole published Indigenous Australian writer during their heyday, and indeed it was not until the 1960s that a second was published - Oodgeroo Noonuccal (Kath Walker). Unaipon, despite coming from South Australia, is not mentioned in the works of the Jindyworobaks, so it is hard to say how much of an influence his book Legendary Tales of the Australian Aborigines had on the movement.

== Members ==
- Nancy Cato
- Norma Davis
- James Devaney
- Minnie Agnes Filson
- William Hart-Smith
- Rex Ingamells
- Ian Mudie
- Roland Robinson
- Victor Kennedy
- Colin Thiele
- Ian Tilbrook

== Major influences ==
- Lyndhurst Giblin
- Mary Gilmore
- Xavier Herbert, through his novels, such as Capricornia
- Margaret Preston, visual artist who strived for a national style based on Aboriginal art, and contributed illustrations and essays to some Jindyworobak publications
- D. H. Lawrence, mainly through his novel Kangaroo
- P. R. Stephensen through The Foundations of Culture in Australia
- Ted Strehlow
