= The Story of Karrawingi the Emu =

Book by Leslie Rees

- First edition
- Author: Leslie Rees
- Language: English
- Genre: Children's fiction
- Publisher: John Sands
- Publication date: 1946
- Publication place: Australia
- Media type: Print
- Pages: 43pp
- Preceded by: Gecko : The Lizard Who Lost His Tail
- Followed by: Digit Dick and the Tasmanian Devil

The Story of Karrawingi the Emu (1946) is an illustrated children's book by Australian author Leslie Rees and illustrator Walter Cunningham. It won the inaugural Children's Book of the Year Award in 1946.

== Synopsis ==
The book tells the story of the life of the noble Australian emu packed with action, adventure and the sense of racing speed that is part of an emu's heritage.

== Critical reception ==
A note in The Western Mail stated: "The prose and the illustrations unfold the life story of an emu, giving a spice of adventure, a little natural history and a great deal of realism in story-telling and ability in illustration".

== Awards ==
In 1946 The Story of Karrawingi the Emu won the Children's Book of the Year, which was the inaugural book prize awarded by the Children's Book Council of Australia.

- Winner, Children's Book of the Year Award: Older Readers (sponsored by the Australian Book Society)

== See also ==
- 1946 in Australian literature
