= Country Town (poem) =

1944 poem by Australian poet Judith Wright

- by Judith Wright
- Written: 1944
- First published in: The Bulletin
- Country: Australia
- Language: English
- Publication date: 20 December 1944
- Lines: 22

"Country Town" (1944) is a poem by Australian poet Judith Wright.

It was originally published in The Bulletin on 20 December 1944, and was subsequently reprinted in the author's single-author collections and a number of Australian poetry anthologies.

== Synopsis ==
This is a nostalgic poem that recognises that the past is no longer with us, though it also acknowledges that "the chains are stronger" now. In spite of that the past should be remembered.

== Critical reception ==
In a review of The Moving Image a reviewer in The Age newspaper found that in this poem, and a few others, Wright "achieves the intensity of feeling, the sureness of phrase, the sensitive pictorial image and the genuine vision illuminating the picture with meaning, which make poetry."

While reviewing the poet's collection Collected Poems 1942-1985 reviewer Maurice Dunleavy noted in The Bulletin that this was one of the poet's poems that are "elegiac in tone, nostalgic laments for a lost past, for what was elemental and wild in the Australian landscape." He went on to add that such works "helped create a myth of a golden age transcending history."

== Publication history ==
After the poem's initial publication in The Bulletin it was reprinted as follows:

- The Moving Image by Judith Wright, Meanjin Press, 1946
- The Boomerang Book of Australian Poetry edited by Enid Moodie Heddle, Longmans Green, 1956
- The Penguin Book of Australian Ballads edited by Russel Ward, Penguin Books, 1964
- Judith Wright : Collected Poems, 1942-1970 by Judith Wright, Angus and Robertson, 1971
- Collected Poems 1942-1985 by Judith Wright, Angus and Robertson, 1994
- Antipodes : Poetic Responses edited by Margaret Bradstock, Phoenix Education, 2011

== See also ==
- 1944 in Australian literature
- 1944 in poetry
