= For New England =

1944 poem by Australian poet Judith Wright

- by Judith Wright
- Country: Australia
- Language: English
- Publisher: Meanjin
- Publication date: Winter 1944
- Lines: 42

"For New England" (1944) is a poem by Australian poet Judith Wright.

It was originally published in Meanjin in Winter 1944, and was subsequently reprinted in the author's single-author collections and a number of Australian poetry anthologies.

The narrator looks back with longing at the land of New England in northern New South Wales.

== Critical reception ==
Reviewing the poet's first collection, The Moving Image, for The Age newspaper, reviewer "E. M." called it one "of the most important poems" in the book. They continued: "It is the first of her poems in which is made a fusion of opposites–something which becomes characteristic of much of her later poetry. It is about the poet's double heritage–and ours. 'Therefore I find in me the double tree, the inheritance from the Old World and that from Australia."

In their essay on the poetry of Judith Wright in Bridgings : Readings in Australian Women's Poetry Rose Lucas and Lyn McCredden note that this poem exemplifies how "Wright feels herself and her art to be the bifurcated product of at least two landscapes, two inheritances, both geographical and conceptual. That divided experience of the poem's speaker is reflected in the dualities of her physical environment; not only is she surrounded by indigenous and introduced species of trees, 'the homesick and the swarthy native', not only is she herself buffetted by the pulls of north and south, foreign and familiar, and the tensions of exploration and exile, but significantly, she also finds within herself, 'the double tree'."

== Publication history ==
After the poem's initial publication in Meanjin it was reprinted as follows:

- The Moving Image by Judith Wright, Meanjin Press, 1946
- Five Senses : Selected Poems by Judith Wright, Angus and Robertson, 1963
- Six Voices : Contemporary Australian Poets edited by Chris Wallace-Crabb, Angus and Robertson, 1963
- Judith Wright : Collected Poems, 1942-1970 by Judith Wright, Angus and Robertson, 1971
- Cross-Country : A Book of Australian Verse edited by John Barnes and Brian MacFarlane, Heinemann, 1984
- The Temperament of Generations : Fifty Years of Writing in Meanjin edited by Jenny Lee, Philip Mead and Gerald Murnane, Melbourne University Press, 1990
- A Human Pattern : Selected Poems by Judith Wright, Angus and Robertson, 1990
- The Macmillan Anthology of Australian Literature edited by Ken L. Goodwin and Alan Lawson, Macmillan, 1990
- Collected Poems 1942-1985 by Judith Wright, Angus and Robertson, 1994
- Bridgings : Readings in Australian Women's Poetry edited by Rose Lucas and Lyn McCredden, Oxford University Press, 1996
- Sense, Shape, Symbol : An Investigation of Australian Poetry edited by Brian Keyte, Phoenix Education, 2013

== See also ==
- 1944 in Australian literature
- 1944 in poetry
