= Eroded Hills =

1951 poem by Australian poet Judith Wright

- by Judith Wright
- Written: 1951
- First published in: The Bulletin
- Country: Australia
- Language: English
- Publication date: 19 September 1951
- Lines: 12

"Eroded Hills" (1951) is a poem by Australian poet Judith Wright, also known under the title "Inheritor".

It was originally published in The Bulletin on 19 September 1951, and was subsequently reprinted in the author's single-author collections and a number of Australian poetry anthologies.

== Synopsis ==
The poet stands and contemplates the bare hills of her country, "these hills that my father's father stripped", and she sees them "naked and whipped humbled/abandoned, out of mind". She longs for a time when they bore trees and fruit, and feels a level of guilt about her association with their desecration.

== Critical reception ==
In his wide-ranging essay concerning myths in Australian poetry in Southerly magazine, Martin Harrison noted that if he were "searching for a key genitive figure in 20th Century Australian poetry, then it would be the figure traced in this and similar poems." He went on to comment "this is a poem which has a conductive and productive relationship with the issues of its time: the poem is what makes them significant. It makes them significant through the figure of an internalisation — a dream."

== Publication history ==
After the poem's initial publication in The Bulletin it was reprinted as follows:

- The Gateway by Judith Wright, Angus and Robertson, 1953
- Five Senses: Selected Poems by Judith Wright, Angus and Robertson, 1963
- Australian Idiom : An Anthology of Contemporary Prose and Poetry edited by Harry Heseltine, Cheshire, 1963
- Judith Wright : Collected Poems, 1942-1970 by Judith Wright, Angus and Robertson, 1971
- A Human Pattern : Selected Poems by Judith Wright, Angus and Robertson, 1990
- Collected Poems 1942-1985 by Judith Wright, Angus and Robertson, 1994
- The Age, 21 February 1988
- Grace and Other Poems by Judith Wright, Picaro Press, 2009
- Macquarie PEN Anthology of Australian Literature edited by Nicholas Jose, Kerryn Goldsworthy, Anita Heiss, David McCooey, Peter Minter, Nicole Moore, and Elizabeth Webby, Allen and Unwin, 2009

== See also ==
- 1951 in Australian literature
- 1951 in poetry
