= Flame-Tree in a Quarry =

1947 poem by Australian poet Judith Wright

- by Judith Wright
- Written: 1947
- First published in: The Bulletin
- Country: Australia
- Language: English
- Publication date: 3 December 1947
- Lines: 16

"Flame-Tree in a Quarry" (1947) is a poem by Australian poet Judith Wright.

It was originally published in The Bulletin on 3 December 1947, and was subsequently reprinted in the author's single-author collections and a number of Australian poetry anthologies.

== Synopsis ==
The poet sees a Queensland flame-tree (Brachychiton acerifolius) growing out of a quarry ("the torn earth's mouth") and sees it as "the world's desire", becoming "filled with fire" in the process.

== Critical reception ==
In her 1995 critical discussion of the work of Judith Wright for Oxford University Press Jennifer Strauss called the poem an "exultant celebration of rebirth [that] confidently symbolises a correspondence between poetic and natural creativity. " Strauss also described it as "perhaps Wright's most striking celebration of the tree as providing, through its embodiment of the natural power of the life-force, a formula for poetry."

Writing about the experiences of Australian authors in the natural world in "Hugging the Shore: The Green Mountains of South-East Queensland", a chapter of The Littoral Zone : Australian Contexts and Their Writers, Ruth Blair comments that Judith Wright doesn't just write about what she sees she "does the further work of the poet which is to record the interactions between the individual and the world outside the self and to draw meaning from experience." When Wright writes about the flame-tree she finds it "the very stuff of life, protesting the human desecration of the landscape."

== Publication history ==
After the poem's initial publication in The Bulletin it was reprinted as follows:

- Woman to Man by Judith Wright, Angus and Robertson, 1949
- Five Senses: Selected Poems by Judith Wright, Angus and Robertson, 1963
- Judith Wright : Collected Poems, 1942-1970 by Judith Wright, Angus and Robertson, 1971
- A Human Pattern : Selected Poems by Judith Wright, Angus and Robertson, 1990
- Australian Poetry in the Twentieth Century edited by Robert Gray and Geoffrey Lehmann, Heinemann, 1991
- Collected Poems 1942-1985 by Judith Wright, Angus and Robertson, 1994
- Australian Poetry Since 1788 edited by Geoffrey Lehmann and Robert Gray, University of NSW Press, 2011
- Sense, Shape, Symbol : An Investigation of Australian Poetry edited Brian Keyte, Phoenix Education, 2013

== See also ==
- 1947 in Australian literature
- 1947 in poetry
