= The Killer (poem) =

1947 poem by Australian poet Judith Wright

- by Judith Wright
- Written: 1947
- First published in: Southerly, December 1947
- Country: Australia
- Language: English
- Lines: 28

"The Killer" (1947) is a poem by Australian poet Judith Wright.

It was originally published in the literary journal Southerly in December 1947, and was subsequently reprinted in the author's single-author collections and a number of Australian poetry anthologies.

== Synopsis ==
The poet wanders down by a creek to take her rest and to get a drink of water. She is surprised by a black snake and lashes out to defend herself.

== Critical reception ==
Andrew Taylor, in his book Reading Australian Poetry, commented that "the poem is an articulation of guilt – not so much simply guilt at having killed something presumed innocent, but guilt at having failed to recognise the 'nmble enemy' as being within herself, and this having killed."

In a review of the poet's collection A Human Pattern : Selected Poems in Poetry Beverley Bie Brahic noted that parts of this poem might owe something to Emily Dickinson, though she went on to add: "if the corseted stanzas, with their inversions and apostrophes ('O move in me ...'), have a whiff of the hand-me-down, Wright's subjects are brand new. As Heaney reveals rural Northern Ireland to us, so Wright trains her refreshingly flinty eye on the settlers of rural Australia."

== Publication history ==
After the poem's initial publication in Southerly it was reprinted as follows:

- Woman to Man by Judith Wright, Angus and Robertson, 1949
- An Anthology of Australian Verse edited by George Mackaness, Angus & Robertson, 1952
- Australian Poets Speak edited by Colin Thiele and Ian Mudie, Rigby, 1961
- Five Senses: Selected Poems by Judith Wright, Angus and Robertson, 1963
- Judith Wright : Selected Poems by Judith Wright, Angus and Robertson, 1963
- The Land's Meaning edited by L. M. Hannan and B. A. Breen, Macmillan, 1973
- Judith Wright : Collected Poems, 1942-1970 by Judith Wright, Angus and Robertson, 1971
- A Human Pattern : Selected Poems by Judith Wright, Angus and Robertson, 1990
- The Penguin Book of Modern Australian Poetry edited by John Tranter and Philip Mead, Penguin, 1991
- Collected Poems 1942-1985 by Judith Wright, Angus and Robertson, 1994
- Poetry Unlocked: An Anthology Arranged in Themes edited by Elaine Hamilton and Robin Farr, FarrBooks, 2006

== See also ==
- 1947 in Australian literature
- 1947 in poetry
