= Train Journey =

1948 poem by Australian poet Judith Wright

- by Judith Wright
- Written: 1948
- First published in: Meanjin
- Country: Australia
- Language: English
- Publication date: Winter 1948

"Train Journey" (1948) is a poem by Australian poet Judith Wright.

It was originally published in Meanjin in Winter 1948, and was subsequently reprinted in the author's single-author collections and a number of Australian poetry anthologies.

Gazing out of a train window during a night journey the poet sees the stark Australian landscape illuminated under a bright moon. She sees both the inherent beauty of the scenery and the harsh realities of the trees that must forge an existence in the unforgiving ground.

== Critical reception ==
Reviewing the 1950 version of the anthology The Oxford Book of Australasian Verse for The Age Michael Thwaites commented that Wright's poem "goes beyond description to interpretation and evocation." Calling Wright Australia's "best lyric poet now writing", the reviewer noted that she "shows the distinctive poetic faculty of using words so as to convey far more than their literal surface meaning."

== Publication history ==
After the poem's initial publication in Meanjin it was reprinted as follows:

- The Oxford Book of Australasian Verse edited by Walter Murdoch, Oxford University Press, 1950
- The Gateway by Judith Wright, Angus and Robertson, 1953
- The Penguin Book of Australian Verse edited by John Thompson, Kenneth Slessor and R. G. Howarth, Penguin Books, 1958
- Five Senses : Selected Poems by Judith Wright, Angus and Robertson, 1963
- Vision : A Magazine of the Arts, Science and Australiana vol. 1 no. 3 December 1963
- Poetry from Australia: Judith Wright, William Hart-Smith, Randolph Stow edited by Howard Sergeant, Pergamon Press, 1969
- Judith Wright : Collected Poems, 1942-1970 by Judith Wright, Angus and Robertson, 1971
- The Golden Apples of the Sun : Twentieth Century Australian Poetry edited by Chris Wallace-Crabbe, Melbourne University Press, 1980
- The World's Contracted Thus edited by J. A. McKenzie and J. K. McKenzie, Heinemann Education, 1983
- My Country : Australian Poetry and Short Stories, Two Hundred Years edited by Leonie Kramer, Lansdowne, 1985
- Cross-Country : A Book of Australian Verse edited by John Barnes and Brian MacFarlane, Heinemann, 1988
- A Human Pattern : Selected Poems by Judith Wright, Angus and Robertson, 1990
- Australian Poetry in the Twentieth Century edited by Robert Gray and Geoffrey Lehmann, Heinemann, 1991
- The Faber Book of Modern Australian Verse edited by Vincent Buckley, Faber, 1991
- Collected Poems 1942-1985 by Judith Wright, Angus and Robertson, 1990
- Bridgings : Readings in Australian Women's Poetry edited by Rose Lucas and Lyn McCredden, Oxford University Press, 1996
- The Puncher & Wattmann Anthology of Australian Poetry edited by John Leonard, Puncher & Wattmann, 2009
- Australian Poetry Since 1788 edited by Geoffrey Lehmann and Robert Gray, University of NSW Press, 2011

== Note ==
You can read the full text of the poem at the All Poetry website.

== See also ==
- 1948 in Australian literature
- 1948 in poetry
