= Verity of Sydney Town =

Book by Ruth C. Williams

- First edition
- Author: Ruth C. Williams
- Language: English
- Genre: Children's fiction
- Publisher: Angus and Robertson
- Publication date: 1950
- Publication place: Australia
- Media type: Print
- Pages: 145pp
- Preceded by: Timothy Tatters
- Followed by: The Aboriginal Story

Verity of Sydney Town (1950) is a children's book by Australian author Ruth C. Williams; it was illustrated by her husband Rhys Williams. It was won the Children's Book of the Year Award: Older Readers in 1951.

== Story outline ==
This is a historical novel for children set in Sydney in the colony of New South Wales during the time of Governor Lachlan Macquarie. Verity Asherton is a 12-year daughter of a sea captain who is missing, and believed dead, by everyone other than Verity.

== Critical reception ==
A reviewer in The Catholic Weekly noted that the book "is beautifully written and so full of charm and interest that it should be a 'must' for all young readers, boys as well as girls."

The Children's Book Week judges reported: "'Verity of Sydney Town' is easily and sincerely written. The narrative flows smoothly, and the turn of phrase keeps the picture within the frame of the period presented — the days of Governor Macquarie. The period atmosphere has been vividly recreated, and is evidently based upon sound historical research. The background, however, is never allowed to become obtrusive, so that the balance of the narrative is not upset. The treatment of character is sympathetic — even the minor characters are alive. The illustrations are attractive, authentic, and help in the successful recreation of the period atmosphere in the book. They have been carefully placed to meet the text at the point which they illustrate. In this aspect the book is an interesting example of sympathetic teamwork between author and artist. The book has been designed and produced with imagination and good taste."

== Awards ==
- 1951 - winner Children's Book of the Year Award: Older Readers

== See also ==
- 1950 in Australian literature
