= Emus (poem) =

1944 poem by Australian poet Mary E. Fullerton

- by Mary E. Fullerton
- First published in: The Bulletin
- Country: Australia
- Language: English
- Publication date: 9 August 1944
- Lines: 28

"Emus" (1944) is a poem by Australian poet Mary E. Fullerton.

It was originally published in The Bulletin on 9 August 1944 as by "E.", and was subsequently reprinted in a number of Australian poetry anthologies.

== Critical reception ==
Reviewing the anthology From the Ballads to Brennan in The New York Times M. I. Rosenthal noted the "visionary realism" of the poem.

== Publication history ==
After the poem's initial publication in The Bulletin in 1944 it was reprinted as follows:

- The Wonder and the Apple by "E.", Angus and Robertson, 1946
- Australian Poetry 1946 edited by T. Inglis Moore, Angus and Robertson, 1947
- From the Ballads to Brennan edited by T. Inglis Moore, Angus & Robertson, 1964
- Australian Verse from 1805 : A Continuum edited by Geoffrey Dutton, Rigby, 1976
- Anthology of Australian Religious Poetry edited by Les Murray, Collins Dove, 1986
- Classic Australian Verse edited by Maggie Pinkney, Five Mile Press, 2001
- The Turning Wave : Poems and Songs of Irish Australia edited by Colleen Burke and Vincent Woods, Kardoorair Press, 2001
- Our Country : Classic Australian Poetry : From Colonial Ballads to Paterson & Lawson edited by Michael Cook, Little Hills Press, 2004
- An Anthology of Australian Poetry to 1920 edited by John Kinsella, University of Western Australia Library, 2007
- 100 Australian Poems You Need to Know edited by Jamie Grant, Hardie Grant, 2008
- The Puncher & Wattmann Anthology of Australian Poetry edited by John Leonard, Puncher & Wattmann, 2009
- Australian Poetry Since 1788 edited by Geoffrey Lehmann and Robert Gray, University of NSW Press, 2011

== See also ==
- 1944 in Australian literature
- 1944 in poetry
