= The Great South Land: An Epic Poem =

Book by Rex Ingamells

The Great South Land : An Epic Poem
- Author: Rex Ingamells
- Language: English
- Publisher: Georgian House, Melbourne
- Publication date: 1951
- Publication place: Australia
- Media type: Print (hardcover)
- Pages: 352
- Preceded by: Come Walkabout

The Great South Land : An Epic Poem (1951) is a poem by Australian author Rex Ingamells. It consists of a sequence of twelve books, with an "Overture" and an epilogue, "The Timeless Covenant". It won the ALS Gold Medal, and the Grace Leven Prize for Poetry, both in 1951.

== Outline ==
The poem is an examination of the history of the Australian continent: from the beginning of the creation of the world, through the arrival of the Aborigines, down to the European exploration and colonisation.

== Notes ==
- Dedication: "This poem is dedicated in gratitude and admiration to Walter Murdoch, distinguished Australian man of letters, a true friend to the author, and a barracker for this generation."

== Contents ==
- "Overture"
- "Book One : Before Man"
- "Book Two : The Aborigines"
- "Book Three : Antiquity"
- "Book Four : Kaleidoscope"
- "Book Five : The Portuguese"
- "Book Six : The Spaniards"
- "Book Seven : The Dutch"
- "Book Eight : The French and the English"
- "Book Nine : The French and the English"
- "Book Ten : Captain Cook"
- "Book Eleven : Invasion"
- "Book Twelve : Discovery"
- "The Timeless Covenant"

== Reviews ==
James Devaney, in his review for The Advocate noted: "To say that a poem stirs the mind and heart is to give it high praise. To be able to say that it gives a new and truer significance to a subject means that it has the greatness of creative writing. This is my judgment of The Great South Land, which is Rex Ingamells' major work and a notable achievement in Australian poetry. The greatness of it is first of all in the vision, and its special interest to us is that it is an epic—an epic for Australia."

The Age reviewer found that the book's subject was history, and also that "Mr. Ingamells' picture of Australian history is incomplete, but nobly conceived." They continued: "THE GREAT SOUTH LAND" is, in its way a splendid poem. This is not to say that in any single aspect it is perfect, or that it is splendid poetry. Its splendor is in its pride in Australia, a valid pride for, which Mr. Ingamells adduces strong reasons strongly expressed."

== Awards and nominations ==
- 1951 winner Grace Leven Prize for Poetry
- 1951 winner ALS Gold Medal
