= Woman to Man =

Poetry collection by Judith Wright

- First edition
- Author: Judith Wright
- Language: English
- Publisher: Angus and Robertson
- Publication date: 1949
- Publication place: Australia
- Media type: Print (hardback)
- Pages: 57p
- Preceded by: The Moving Image
- Followed by: Woman to Child

Woman to Man (1949) is the second collection of poetry by Australian poet Judith Wright. It won the Grace Leven Prize for Poetry in 1949.

The collection consists of 44 poems, some with their original publication in this book, and some of which were had been previously published in magazines such as Meanjin, Southerly and The Bulletin and various Australian poetry collections.

== Contents ==
- "Woman to Man"
- "Woman's Song"
- "Woman to Child"
- "Conch-Shell"
- "The Maker"
- "Pain"
- "Child and Wattle-Tree"
- "The Sisters"
- "Spring After War"
- "The Child"
- "Camphor Laurel"
- "The Garden"
- "The World and the Child"
- "Night After Bushfire"
- "The Bull"
- "Dream"
- "The Cycads"
- "The Twins"
- "Winter Kestrel"
- "The Flood"
- "Eli, Eli"
- "The Builders"
- "The Mirror at the Fun Fair"
- "The Bushfire"
- "The Unborn"
- "Night"
- "The City Asleep"
- "The Killer"
- "Metho Drinker"
- "Stars"
- "The Old Prison"
- "The Bones Speak"
- "Letter to a Friend"
- "Midnight"
- "Song in a Wine-Bar"
- "Flame-Tree in a Quarry"
- "Brown Bird"
- "Wonga Vine"
- "Night and the Child"
- "The Dust in the Township"
- "The Blind Man"
- "Country Dance"
- "The Singer to the Child"
- "Lost Boy"
- "Blind Man's Song"

== Critical reception ==
A reviewer in The Age, in a survey of the poet's work to that time, was impressed by the collection finding that it "contains the beautiful, evocative poems which, I think, place the idea of the creation of a child back on the plane of understanding that brought the Madonna image into being, and also such hauntingly lovely things as Dream; and in this book; too is the strong consciousness of being 'the maker' — the lyric songs of, the creator."

== Awards ==
- 1949 - winner Grace Leven Prize for Poetry

== See also ==
- 1949 in literature
- 1949 in Australian literature
