= Guy Innes =

Australian journalist

Guy Innes (1879–1953) was an Australian journalist who was the editor of The Herald newspaper in Melbourne between 1918 and 1921.

Innes was born in Ballarat and became a journalist for The Argus in 1900. In 1910 he moved to The Herald, becoming the editor in 1918, a position he maintained for three years until he was replaced by Keith Murdoch. In 1922, he took up a position as manager of The Herald's cable service in London.

During this time he became a well-known Australian identity on Fleet Street, serving on committees for the Institute of Journalists. He contributed poems to The Bulletin and other journals for many years under the pseudonyms Kettledrum and Ponemah as well as his own name.

Innes died in London in 1953, survived by his wife Dorothy (née Gray) and son Geoffrey, a film producer.
