= Rod Usher =

Australian author living in Spain (born 1946)

Roderick Macleod Usher (born 1946) is an Australian author living in Spain.

== Background ==
Usher's father was American, and his mother was Australian. He grew up in Melbourne, where he studied law before taking up journalism. He now lives in Extremadura, Spain.

He is a former chief sub-editor of The Sunday Times in London and a former literary editor of The Age in Melbourne. Until 2001 he was senior writer for Time magazine in Europe. Most of his working life has involved journalism, including ten years on Fleet Street, though he has also published several works of non-fiction, two collections of poetry and three novels.

== Works ==
=== Novels ===
- A Man of Marbles (1989)
- Florid States (1999)
- Poor Man's Wealth (2011)

=== Poetry ===
- Above Water (1985)
- Smiling Treason (1992)

=== Non-Fiction ===
- Sleep: Things That Happen in the Night (1986) (also published under the title Sleep: All You Ever Wanted to Know About Sleep But Were Too Tired to Ask)
- Images of Our Time: 35 Years of Australian Press Photography (1989)
- Their Best Shots: 21 Years of the Nikon Awards (1990)

=== Articles ===
His articles in Time magazine include "A Tall story for our time" (1996) and "Live and Let Die" (1998).

"A Tall Story for our Time", published in 1996, discusses the hypothesis that a nation's average stature can be a measure of well being, more accurate than per capita income or GDP statistics. Height reflects diet, wealth, quality of living situations, stresses and other health factors. The data used to back up his height measurements in the different countries comes from various sources including records from Tall Persons Club of Great Britain and Ireland, the Marine Society, the National Guard and even the Royal military Academy at Sand Hurst.
