= Andrew Burke (poet) =

Australian poet (1944–2023)

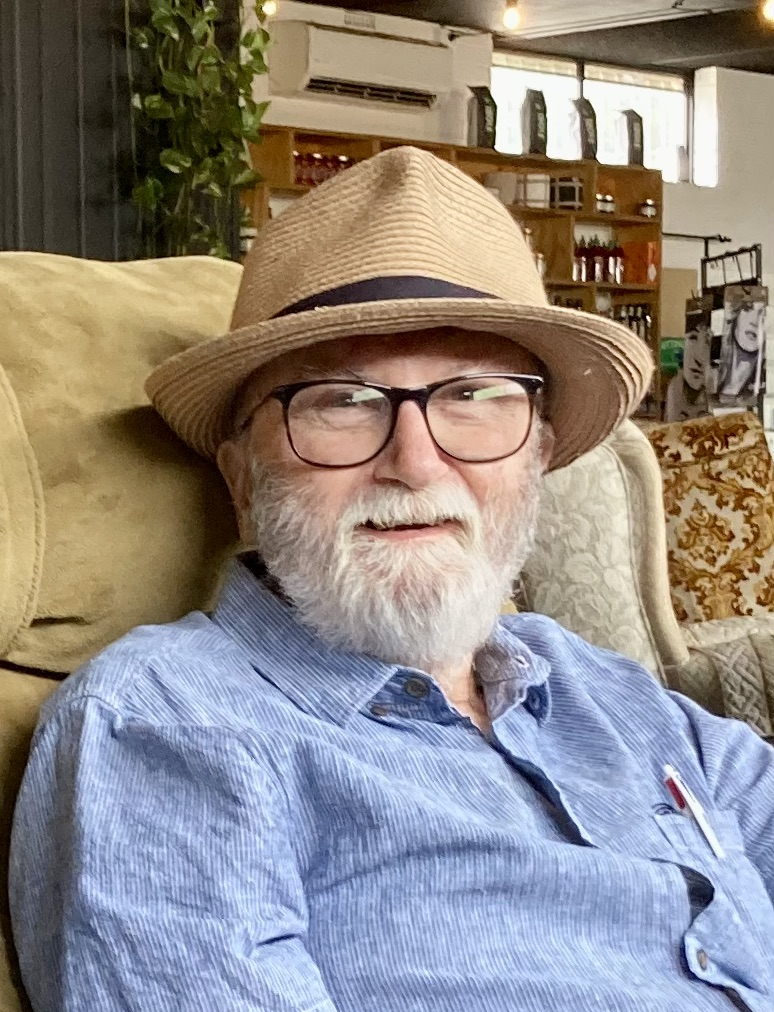
- Burke in 2023
- Born: 27 July 1944; Melbourne, Victoria
- Died: 23 May 2023 (aged 78); Perth, Western Australia
- Occupation: Writer
- Writing career
- Genre: Poetry
- Website: hispirits.blogspot.com

Andrew Burke (born 27 July 1944 in Melbourne, Victoria, died 23 May 2023 in Perth) was a contemporary Australian poet.

Early in his working life, Burke pursued a career in advertising as a copywriter and creative director.

In the 1970s he had received prizes: the Thomas Wardle poetry prize of 1973, and in 1977 the Tom Collins poetry prize.

He switched to academia as a literature and creative writing lecturer in middle age. He received a MA in writing from Edith Cowan University in 2002, and a PhD in writing in 2006.

He has lectured in Australia and China, and read his poetry to audiences of all ages in the United Kingdom, Singapore, China, and throughout Australia.

His poetry has been included in Western Australian and Australian anthologies.

Collections of his poems exist online, and his blog included poetry. Burke died in May 2023.

== Works ==
- 1975 Let's face the music & dance
- 1983 On the tip of my tongue
- 1992 Mother waits for father late
  - (reprinted in 2010) by Picaro Press, Warners Bay, N.S.W. ISBN 978-1-920957-97-1
- 1996 Pushing at silence Applecross, W.A.: Folio (Salt), ISBN 0-646-29751-1
- 2001 Whispering Gallery Cottesloe, W.A.: Sunline Press, ISBN 0-9579515-0-7
- 2003 Knock on wood : and other poems Warners Bay, N.S.W. : Picara Press, Wagtail (series), 1444-8424; 18
- 2009 Beyond City Limits International Centre for Landscape and Language, Edith Cowan University, Mt Lawley, W.A. ISBN 978-0-646-52005-6
- 2011 Blue Rose Etext Press ISBN 978-1-921968-09-9 also found at Smashwords
- 2011 Qwerty : take my word for it Kalgoorlie, W.A. :Mulla Mulla Press ISBN 978-0-9870771-2-7
- 2012 Shikibu Shuffle with Phil Hall
- 2012 Undercover of Lightness North Hobart, Tas.: Walleah Press ISBN 978-1-877010-16-3
- 2014 One Hour Seeds Another North Hobart, Tas.: Walleah Press
- 2017 The Line is Busy
