= Nan McDonald =

Australian poet and editor

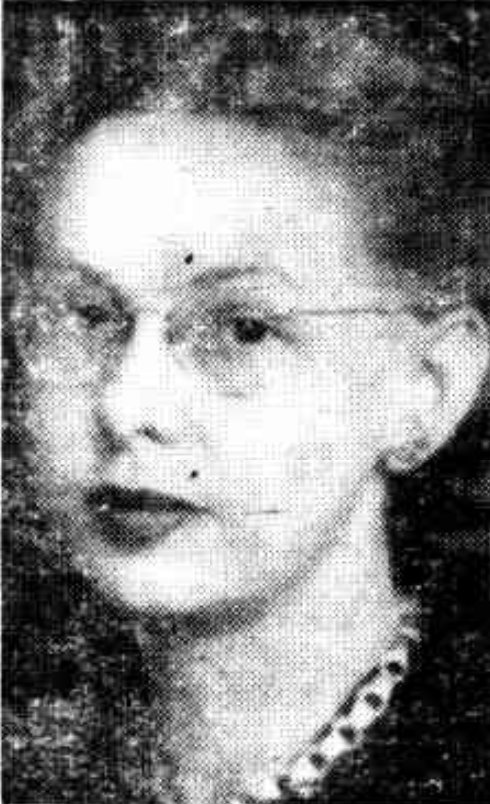
- Born: Nancy May McDonald; 25 December 1921; Eastwood, New South Wales
- Died: 7 January 1974 (aged 52); Mount Ousley, New South Wales, Australia
- Education: BA, University of Sydney
- Writing career
- Language: English
- Years active: 1944-1969
- Notable work: Pacific Sea
- Notable awards: Grace Leven Prize for Poetry

Nancy May McDonald (25 December 1921 – 7 January 1974) was an Australian poet and editor.

== Biography ==
Nancy May McDonald was born in Eastwood, New South Wales, 25 December 1921. She attended Hornsby Girls' High School (1934–38), and studied at the University of Sydney (B.A., 1943). She worked as an editor for Angus and Robertson, where she specialized in Australian literature, with colleagues such as Alec Bolton, Beatrice Davis and Douglas Stewart. In 1953 she edited the annual Anthology of Australian Poetry. She first published in 1947; a review of the collection, Pacific Sea, called her work "essentially Australian" and praised her "exquisite precision". Her poems have also been called "sombre and deathward-drawn". McDonald died aged 52 of cancer on 7 January 1974.

An obituary in the Australian Author noted R. D. Fitzgerald's description of McDonald as "the tranquil Australian poet". Several sources record that McDonald's work has yet to be assessed from a critical perspective.

== Awards and honours ==
McDonald contributed to the school magazine at Hornsby Girls' High School, twice winning the school's Ethel Curlewis (née Turner) prize for verse.

Her first published collection of poetry, Pacific Sea (1947), won the inaugural Grace Leven Prize for Poetry.

== Works ==
- Pacific Sea (1947)
- The Lonely Fire, Sydney, Angus and Robertson, 1954
- The Lighthouse and Other Poems, Sydney, Angus and Robertson, 1959
- Selected Poems: Nan McDonald, Sydney, Angus and Robertson, 1969
- Burn to Billabong: Macdonald Clansfolk in Australia 1788-1988, Sydney, Portofino Design Group, 1988
- For Prisoners: An Unpublished Poem, Canberra, Brindabella Press, 1995
