= William Hart-Smith =

New Zealand poet

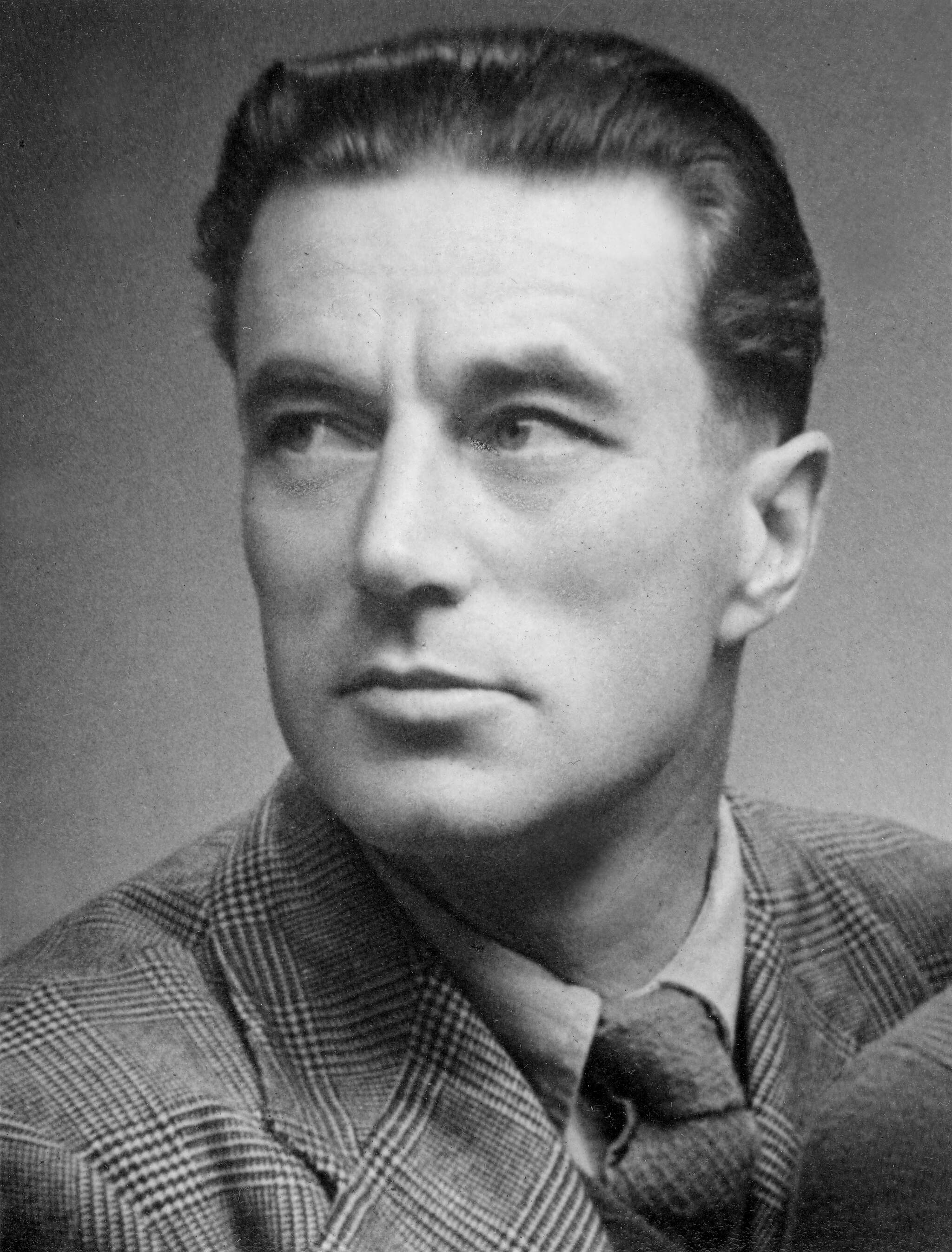
- William Hart-Smith in 1951
- Born: 23 November 1911
- Died: 15 April 1990 (aged 78)
- Citizenship: New Zealand
- Occupation: poet

William Hart-Smith (23 November 1911 – 15 April 1990) was a New Zealand/Australian poet

== Early life ==
Hart-Smith was born in Tunbridge Wells, Kent, England. His family moved to New Zealand in 1924. He had about "seven years of formal schooling" in England, Scotland and New Zealand before getting work at 15. His first job was as a radio mechanic. In 1936 he emigrated to Australia, working in commercial radio, and then the Australian Broadcasting Commission. He then did army service, returned to ABC, and resigned spending a year in the Northern Territory, becoming a freelance writer.

== Career ==
Hart-Smith was connected with the Jindyworobak Movement and had some of his work, such as Columbus Goes West (1943), published by them. However he spent only a decade in Australia, returning to New Zealand in 1946. From 1948 to 1954 he taught in adult education.

He spent several years in Perth from the late 1960s, associating with younger poets including Andrew Lansdown, Hal Colebatch and Lee Knowles. He was a prolific writer of poetry into old age, though many of his later poems have never been collected. He was also a distinguished conchologist, specialising in classifying cowrie shells. He said he had come to Perth from Sydney to find unpolluted water for shelling.

== Later life ==
He was awarded the ALS Gold Medal in 1960, and won the Patrick White Award in 1987. He died in 1990.

== Recordings ==
Hart-Smith recorded poetry readings in 1977. The recording can be found at the National Library of Australia.

== Bibliography ==
- Poems (1942, self-published)
- Columbus Goes West (1943, Jindyworobak)
- Harvest (1945, Georgian House)
- The Unceasing Ground (1946, Angus and Robertson)
- Christopher Columbus : A Sequence of Poems (1948, The Caxton Press)
- On the Level (1950, self-published)
- Poems in Doggerel (1955, Handcraft Press)
- Poems of Discovery (1959, Angus and Robertson)
- The Talking Clothes : Poems (1966, Angus and Robertson)
- Mini-Poems (1974, Lesmurdie)
- Let me Learn the Steps : Poems from a Psychiatric Ward (1977, self-published) with Mary Morris
- Selected Poems 1936-1984 (1985, Angus and Robertson)
- Hand to Hand : A Garnering (1991, Butterfly Books)
- Birds, Beasts, Flowers : Australian Children's Poetry (1996, Penguin)

=== Selected list of poems ===
Title	Year	First published	Reprinted/collected in
"Baiamai's Never-Failing Stream"	1944	Meanjin Papers, Autumn 1944,	Harvest, Jindyworobak Publications, 1945, p13
