= Ruth C. Williams =

Australian writer

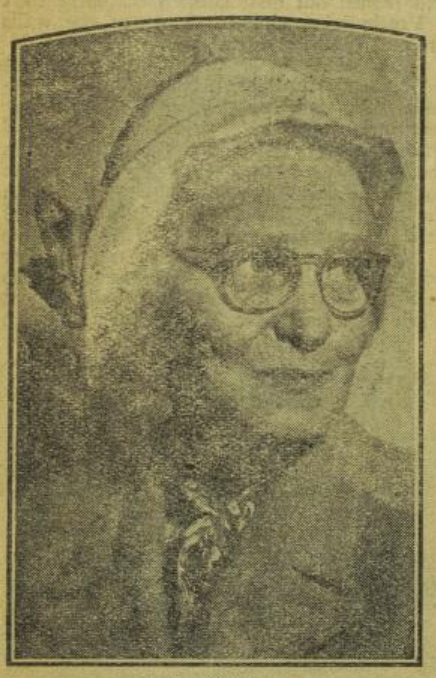
- Ruth C. Williams, 1950
- Born: 1897; London, England
- Died: 1982 (aged 84–85)
- Occupations: writer and illustrator
- Writing career
- Language: English
- Years active: 1945-1955
- Notable work: Verity of Sydney Town
- Notable awards: Children's Book of the Year Award: Older Readers 1951

Ruth C. Williams (1897-1982) was an Australian writer for children who was born in London England. In 1950, she received the Children's Book of the Year Award: Older Readers for Verity of Sydney Town.

She was married to Australian landscape artist Rhys Williams, who illustrated each of her books.

NSW Births Deaths and Marriages records show Ruth Williams was born and married Rhys Williams as Constance Ruth Fox and died as Constance Ruth Williams. She appears to have written and been known as Ruth Williams.

== Bibliography ==
=== Children's fiction ===
- Pirate's Gold (1945) illustrated by Rhys Williams
- Our Friend Rodney (1945) illustrated by Rhys Williams
- Timothy Tatters (1947) illustrated by Rhys Williams
- Verity of Sydney Town (1950) illustrated by Rhys Williams

=== Children's verse ===
- The Adventures of Georgie Grub (1946) illustrated by Rhys Williams
- More Adventures of Georgie Grub (1946) illustrated by Rhys Williams

=== Non-fiction ===
- The Aboriginal Story (1955) illustrated by Rhys Williams

== Awards and nominations ==
- 1950 - winner Children's Book of the Year Award: Older Readers for Verity of Sydney Town
