= Dora Wilcox =

New Zealand-born Australian poet and playwright

Dora Wilcox (born Mary Theodora Wilcox, 24 November 1873 – 14 December 1953), was a New Zealand and Australian poet and playwright.

== Biography ==
Dora Wilcox
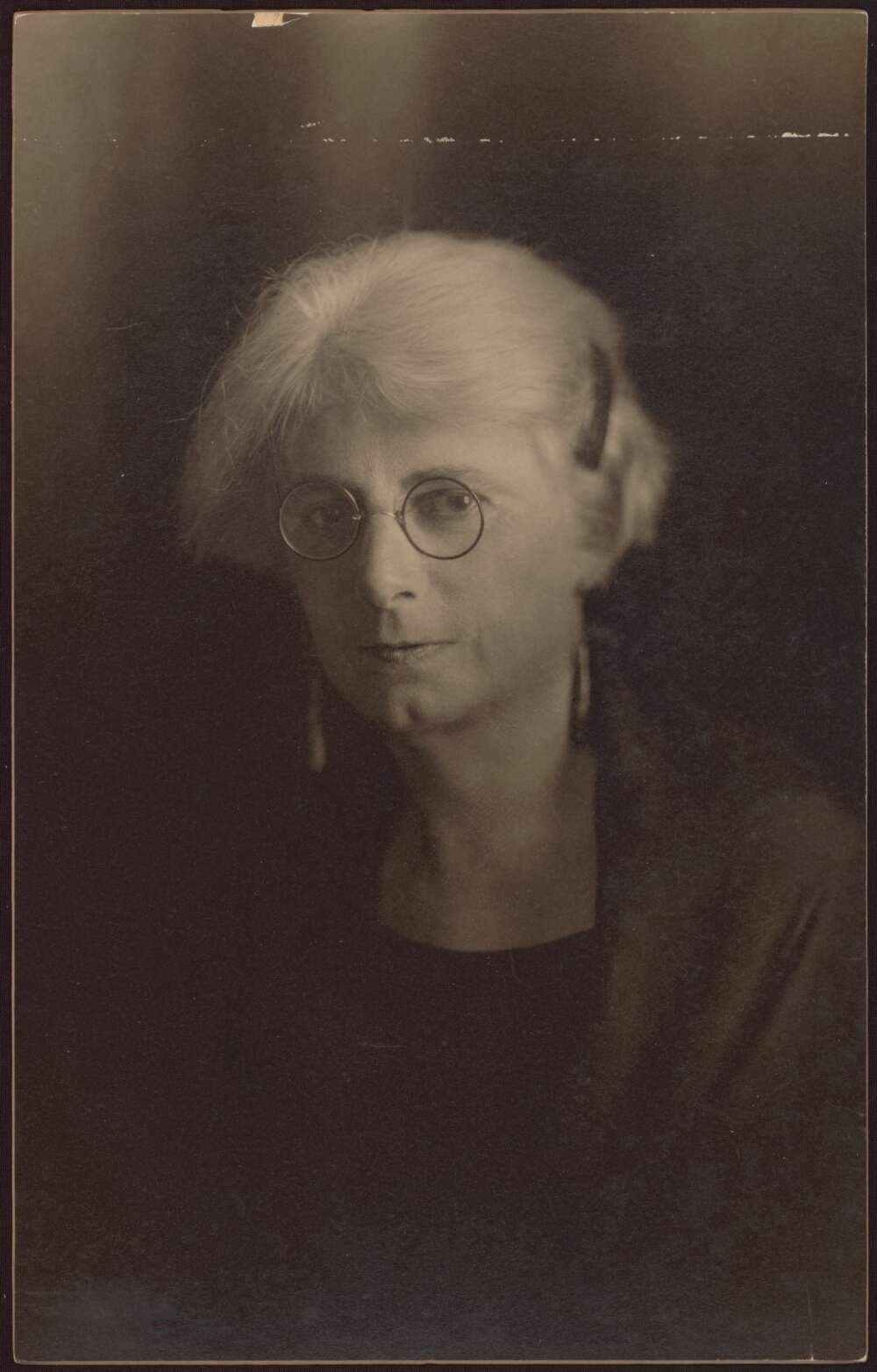
- Portrait of Dora Wilcox by May Moore, 1926
- Born: Mary Theodora Wilcox; 24 November 1873 Christchurch, New Zealand
- Died: 14 December 1953 (aged 80) Neutral Bay, Sydney, Australia
- Occupation: Poet, Playwright
- Period: 1905-1930
- Notable works: Australia in Luce
- Notable awards: Australian Play Society, first prize for "The Raid"

Wilcox was born in Christchurch, New Zealand to William Henry Wilcox and his wife Mary Elizabeth, née Washbourne. She was educated privately and at Canterbury College, before spending three years teaching in Armidale, New South Wales. She had been publishing work in periodicals, including the Sydney Bulletin, since the age of twelve, and made the move to Australia according to an "old friend" and obituary writer "to seek her literary fortune".

She spent the next two decades in Europe, initially touring with her mother. While overseas she published two books of verse with George Allen (all the while publishing many poems and articles in the periodical press) and married Professor Paul Hamelius of the University of Liège. After Professor Hamelius's death in 1922 she returned to Australia. She had by that time met and married the Melbourne writer and art critic William Moore (1868–1937), with whom she later set up home in Sydney. Following his death, she became his literary executrix.

She continued to publish verse, many articles of historical and literary interest and several plays which were produced and won prizes. Her poem "Australia in Luce" was selected to commemorate the opening of Parliament at Canberra in 1927, and "Anzac Day" was set to music by Alfred Hill and often included in official commemorations. Her 1932 play, The Raid, was awarded first place in a competition for one-act plays organised by the Australian Play Society. She was well known in Australian literary and art circles and often an invited speaker at events in Sydney.

Wilcox died on 14 December 1953 in a private hospital in Neutral Bay.

== Works ==
=== Poetry ===
- Verses from Maoriland, George Allen, London, 1905
- Rata and Mistletoe, George Allen, London, 1911

=== Plays ===
- Arawa, unpublished, pre-1923
- Aroha, unpublished, c.1925
- Life at the Waratah in the Early 'Fifties, unpublished, c.1929
- Commander Capstan: Comedy in one-act, Dora Wilcox, Sydney, 1931
- The Raid, unpublished, 1932
- The Four Poster: A Fantasy in One Act, in Best Australian One-Act Plays, William Moore & T. Inglis Moore, Angus and Robertson, Sydney, 1937 — first performed in 1930
