= Rex Ingamells =

Australian poet

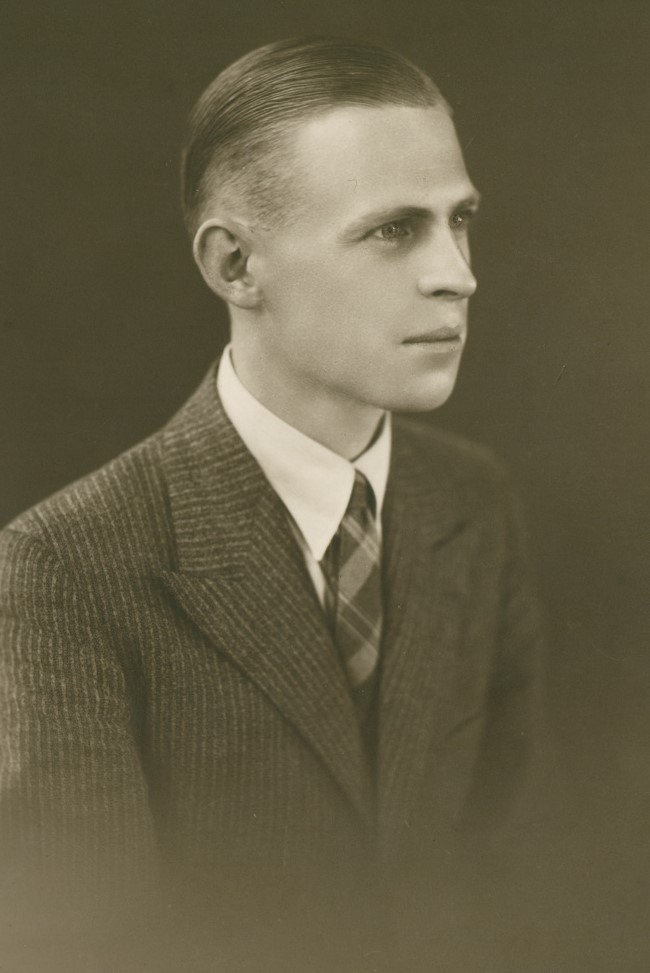
- Born: Reginald Charles (Rex) Ingamells; 19 January 1913; Orroroo, South Australia, Australia
- Died: 30 December 1955 (aged 42); Dimboola, Victoria, Australia
- Occupation: Poet
- Writing career
- Period: 1935–1955
- Literary movement: Jindyworobak Movement

Reginald Charles (Rex) Ingamells (19 January 1913 – 30 December 1955) was an Australian poet, generally credited with being the leading light of the Jindyworobak Movement.

Rex Ingamells was born in Orroroo, South Australia to a Methodist minister, and attended Port Lincoln High School, where he became interested in poetry. He later attended Prince Alfred College and the University of Adelaide. After a trip at the turn of the thirties, Ingamells became fascinated with Indigenous Australian culture, and became inspired to found the Jindyworobaks a few years later.

In 1935, his first book Gum Tops was published. He died near Dimboola, Victoria in a car-crash in 1955.

== Early life ==
Ingamells was born on 19 January 1913 in Orroroo, South Australia. He was the oldest of four children born to Mabel Gwendolen (née Fraser) and Eric Marfleet Ingamells. His father was a Methodist minister and the family moved frequently around country South Australia during his childhood. Ingamells attended schools in Meadows, Burra and Port Lincoln, before being sent to Adelaide to board at Prince Alfred College from 1927 to 1930. He attended the University of Adelaide and graduated Bachelor of Arts in 1934, majoring in history.

== Bibliography ==
=== Novel ===
- Of Us Living Now (1952)
- Aranda boy (1952)

=== Poetry ===
- Gumtops (1935)
- Forgotten People (1936)
- Sun-Freedom (1938)
- Memory of Hills (1940)
- Content are the Quiet Ranges (1943)
- Unknown Land (1943)
- Selected Poems (1944)
- Come Walkabout (1948)
- The Great South Land : An Epic Poem (1951)
- Shifting Camp
- The Golden Bird

=== Criticism ===
- Conditional Culture (1938)

== Awards and honours ==
- 1951 winner Grace Leven Prize for Poetry for The Great South Land : An Epic Poem
- 1951 winner ALS Gold Medal for The Great South Land : An Epic Poem
