= Mary Eliza Fullerton =

Australian writer

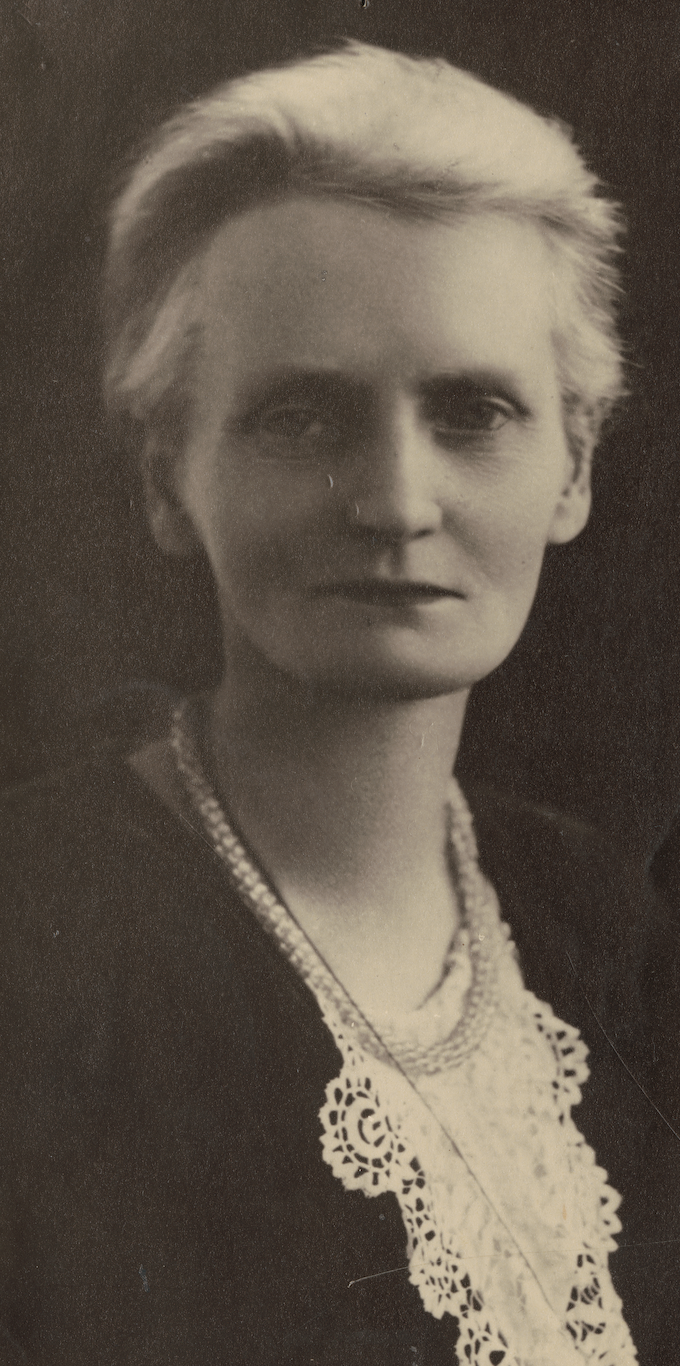
- Born: 14 May 1868; Glenmaggie, Victoria, Australia
- Died: 23 February 1946 (aged 77); Maresfield, England
- Other names: "Alpenstock" "Austeal" "E"
- Occupation: Author

Mary Eliza Fullerton (14 May 1868 – 23 February 1946) was an Australian writer.

== Biography ==
Fullerton was born on 14 May 1868 in Glenmaggie, Victoria. She attended her local state school and was educated by her mother. After leaving school she stayed on her parents' property, until she moved to Melbourne in her early twenties.

She was active in the women's suffrage movement from the 1890s and early 1900s. During World War I she wrote articles on feminist issues and arguing against conscription for Victorian publications. She was a member the Victorian Socialist Party and the Women's Political Association.

She visited England in 1912 and moved there in 1922 with her companion Mabel Singleton.

Fullerton died in Maresfield, England on 23 February 1946.

== Archive ==
Letters from Fullerton to family members and correspondence between Fullerton and Miles Franklin are included in the Papers of Alan Wilson and the Wilson Family, that are held in the State Library of Victoria manuscript collection.

== Literary career ==
She sometimes wrote under the pen name Alpenstock, producing poetry, short fiction, and essays for periodicals. She wrote three novels between 1921 and 1925 under her own name, but fearing prejudice against her as a woman without a university education, publication of her two last works in verse, Moles do so little with their privacy and The wonder and the apple, were published under the pseudonym E. Their publication was arranged by her friend Miles Franklin. Her identity as their author was revealed after her death.

== Bibliography ==
- Fullerton, Mary E. (Mary Eliza) (1908), Moods and melodies : sonnets and lyrics, Thomas C. Lothian
- Fullerton, Mary E. (Mary Eliza); University of Sydney. Library. Scholarly Electronic Text and Image Service (1921), The breaking furrow, University of Sydney Library, Scholarly Electronic Text and Image Service
- Fullerton, Mary E. (1923), Two women : Clare, Margaret, Philpot
- Fullerton, Mary E. (Mary Eliza) (1925), The people of the timber belt, A.M. Philpot
- Fullerton, Mary Eliza (1928), Australia and other essays, Dent and Sons
- Fullerton, Mary E. (Mary Eliza) (1930), A juno of the bush, Heath Cranton
- Fullerton, Mary Eliza; Sydney Electronic Text and Image Service (SETIS) (1931), Bark house days, Heath Cranton
- Fullerton, Mary E. (Mary Eliza); Moore, T. Inglis; Franklin, Miles (1942), Moles do so little with their privacy : poems, Angus & Robertson
- The Wonder and the Apple by "E.", 1946

=== Selected list of poems ===
Title	Year	First published	Reprinted/collected in
"Emus"	1944	The Bulletin, 9 August 1944	The Wonder and the Apple : More Poems, Angus & Robertson, 1946, p. 1

== See also ==
- List of Australian women writers
- List of women writers
