= Roland Robinson (poet) =

Australian poet

Roland Robinson OAM
- Born: Roland Edward Robinson; 12 June 1912; Balbriggan, County Dublin, Ireland
- Died: 8 February 1992 (aged 79); Newcastle, New South Wales, Australia
- Occupation: Poet

Roland Edward Robinson OAM (12 June 1912 – 8 February 1992) was an Australian poet, writer and collector of Australian Aboriginal myths.

== Life and career ==
Robinson was born in Balbriggan, County Dublin, Ireland in 1912. At the age of 9, in 1922 he was brought to Australia. After only a brief education he worked in various jobs, mainly in the bush as a roustabout, boundary-rider, railway fettler, fencer, dam-builder, gardener and as a lifelong love - a ballet dancer.

Robinson's first published poetry appeared in Beyond the Grass-Tree Spears published in 1944. He served in the Australian Army. His love of the Australian landscape and everyday scenes were inspiration for his poetry. He was one of the most dedicated poets to the Jindyworobak Movement.

As well as a writer and poet, Robinson was dance critic for The Sydney Morning Herald in the 1950s and 1960s. In the 1940s he took classes with Helene Kirsova and appeared in a number of productions by the Kirsova Ballet."Robinson, Roland (1912 - 1992)". Australia Dancing. Archived from the original on 29 August 2007.

Robinson was a distinguished poet and writer who spent his later years in Lake Macquarie. After his death in 1992, Lake Macquarie City Council established The Roland Robinson Literary Award, an annual award to honour Robinson's contribution to literature and culture, and to foster creative literary talent in the city.

In 1997, Lake Macquarie City Council named the new library at Belmont in his honour."About Roland Robinson". City of Lake Macquarie. Robinson worked very closely with Aboriginal people from all over Australia writing down their myths. Perhaps his most important work was conducted with various Aboriginal people from the New South Wales. In particular his collaboration with Percy Mumbulla of the Yuin people.

== Awards ==
- 1984 – recipient of the Medal of the Order of Australia, for "services to literature, particularly in the preservation of Australian Aboriginal mythology"
- 1988 – Patrick White Award
- 1991 – Honorary Degree, Doctor of Letters, University of Newcastle
- 1991 – Freeman of the City of Lake Macquarie

== Bibliography ==
=== Poetry ===
See also List of Poems by Roland Robinson

- Beyond the Grass-tree Spears: Verse (1944)
- Language of the Sand : Poems (1949)
- Tumult of the Swans (1953)
- Deep Well (1962)
- Altjeringa and Other Aboriginal Poems (1970)
- The Hooded Lamp (1976)
- Selected poems (1944-1982) (1983)

=== Writing ===
- Black-feller, white-feller (1958)
- The Man Who Sold his Dreaming (1965)
- Wandjina, Children of the Dreamtime : Aboriginal Myths & Legends (1968) illustrations by Roderick Shaw
- Aboriginal myths & legends : age-old stories of the Australian tribes (1969)illustrated by Roderick Shaw
- The Australian Aboriginal (1977) photographs by Douglass Baglin

=== Autobiography ===
- The Drift of Things: an Autobiography, 1914-52 (1973)
- The Shift of Sands: an Autobiography, 1952-62 (1976)
- A Letter to Joan: an Autobiography, 1962-73 (1978)

=== Documentary ===
- The Back of Beyond (1954) directed by John Heyer"The Back of Beyond". Australian Screen. Archived from the original on 10 February 2008.
- "Roland Robinson: The land as voice" (Artwrite Pictures: 1987)"A nation is built and Roland Robinson: The land as voice". State Library or NSW.

==== Selected list of poems ====
Title	Year	First published	Reprinted/collected in
"Mapooram"	1960	The Bulletin, 17 February 1960	Altjeringa and Other Aboriginal Poems, Reed, 1970, pp. 22–23
