= Judith Wright =

Australian poet and activist (1915–2000)

Judith Arundell Wright
- Born: Judith Arundell Wright; 31 May 1915; Armidale, New South Wales, Australia
- Died: 25 June 2000 (aged 85); Canberra, Australian Capital Territory, Australia
- Occupations: Poet; author; environmentalist; activist
- Spouse: Jack McKinney
- Children: 1
- Awards: Queen's Gold Medal for Poetry (1991), Australian National Living Treasure Award (1998)

Judith Arundell Wright (31 May 1915 – 25 June 2000) was an Australian poet, environmentalist and campaigner for Aboriginal land rights. She was a recipient of the Christopher Brennan Award and nominated for the Nobel Prize in Literature in 1964, 1965 and 1967.

== Biography ==
Judith Wright was born in Armidale, New South Wales. The eldest child of Phillip Wright and his first wife, Ethel, she spent most of her formative years in Brisbane and Sydney. Wright was of Cornish ancestry. Following the early death of her mother, she lived with her aunt and then boarded at New England Girls' School after her father's remarriage in 1929. After graduating, Wright studied philosophy, English, psychology and history at the University of Sydney. At the beginning of World War II, she returned to her father's station (ranch) to help during the shortage of labour caused by the war.

Wright's first book of poetry, The Moving Image, was published in 1946 while she was working at the University of Queensland as a research officer. Then, she had also worked with Clem Christesen on the literary magazine Meanjin, the first edition of which was published in late 1947. In 1950 she moved to Mount Tamborine, Queensland, with the novelist and abstract philosopher Jack McKinney. Their daughter Meredith was born in the same year. They married in 1962, but Jack was to live only until 1966.

In 1966, she published The Nature of Love, her first collection of short stories, through Sun Press, Melbourne. Set mainly in Queensland, they include 'The Ant-lion', 'The Vineyard Woman', 'Eighty Acres', 'The Dugong', 'The Weeping Fig' and 'The Nature of Love', all first published in The Bulletin. Wright was nominated for the 1967 Nobel Prize for Literature.

With David Fleay, Kathleen McArthur and Brian Clouston, Wright was a founding member and, from 1964 to 1976, president, of the Wildlife Preservation Society of Queensland. In 1991, she was the second Australian to receive the Queen's Gold Medal for Poetry.

She was involved in the Poets Union.

For the last three decades of her life, Wright lived near the New South Wales town of Braidwood. She moved to the Braidwood area to be closer to H. C. "Nugget" Coombs, her lover of 25 years, who was based in Canberra.

Wright started to lose her hearing in her mid-20s and became completely deaf by 1992.

== Poet and critic ==
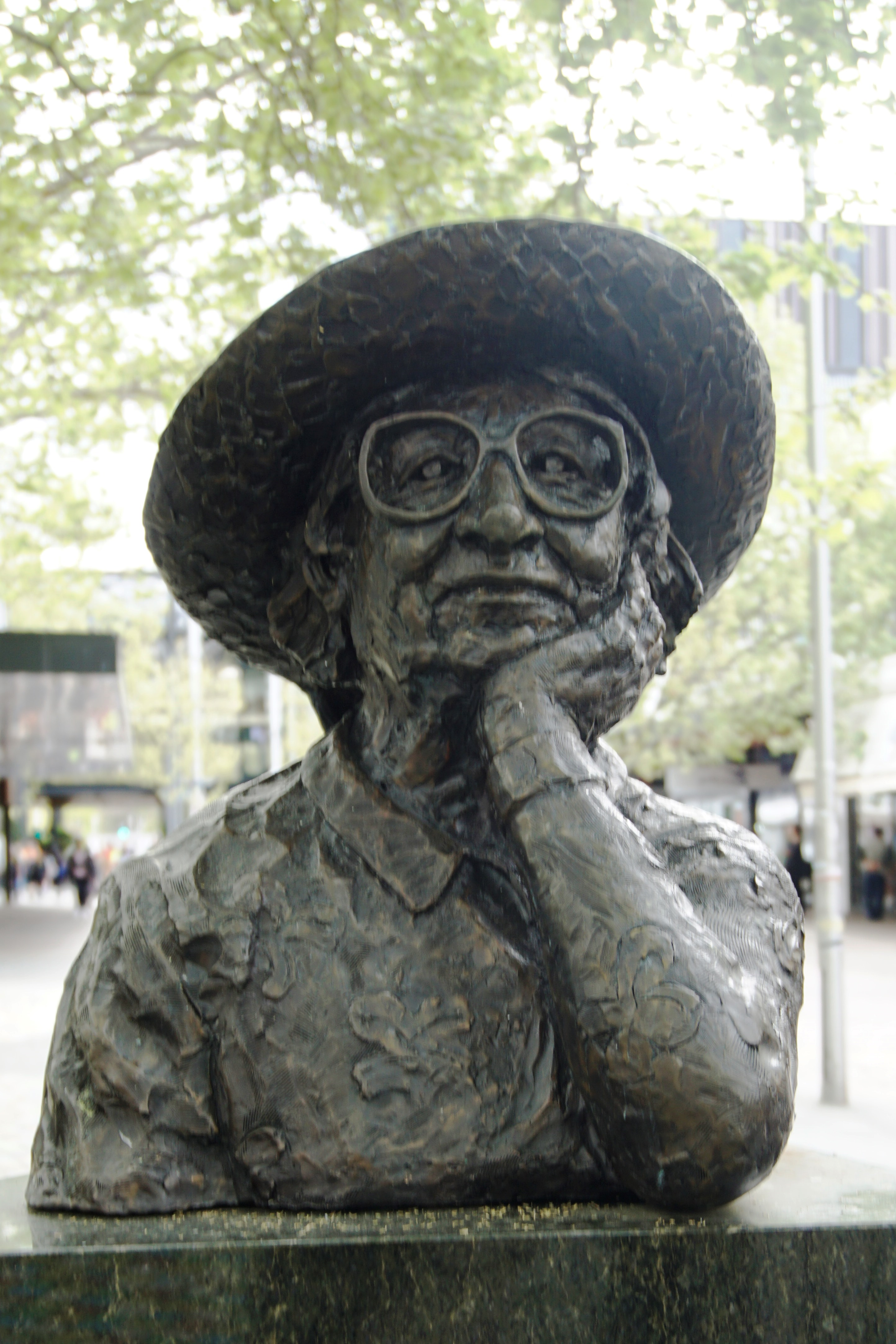
Bust of Wright in Garema Place, Canberra

Wright was the author of collections of poetry, including The Moving Image, Woman to Man, The Gateway, The Two Fires, Birds, The Other Half, Magpies, Shadow and Hunting Snake. Her work is noted for a keen focus on the Australian environment, which began to gain prominence in Australian art in the years following World War II. She deals with the relationship between settlers, Indigenous Australians and the bush, among other themes. Wright's aesthetic centres on the relationship between mankind and the environment, which she views as the catalyst for poetic creation. Her images characteristically draw from the Australian flora and fauna, yet contain a mythic substrata that probes at the poetic process, limitations of language, and the correspondence between inner existence and objective reality.

Wright's poems have been translated into a number of languages, including Italian, Japanese and Russian. Along with Brendan Kennelly, she is the most featured poet in The Green Book of Poetry, a large ecopoetry anthology by Ivo Mosley (Frontier Publishing 1993), which was published by Harper San Francisco in 1996 as Earth Poems: Poems from Around the World to Honor the Earth.

=== Birds ===
In 2003, the National Library of Australia published an expanded edition of Wright's collection titled Birds. Most of these poems were written in the 1950s when she was living on Tamborine Mountain in southeast Queensland. Meredith McKinney, Wright's daughter, writes that they were written at "a precious and dearly-won time of warmth and bounty to counterbalance at last what felt, in contrast, the chilly dearth and difficulty of her earlier years". McKinney goes on to say that "many of these poems have a newly relaxed, almost conversational tone and rhythm, an often humorous ease and an intimacy of voice that surely reflects the new intimacies and joys of her life". Despite the joy reflected in the poems, however, they also acknowledge "the experiences of cruelty, pain and death that are inseparable from the lives of birds as of humans ... and [turn] a sorrowing a clear-sighted gaze on the terrible damage we have done and continue to do to our world, even as we love it".

== Environmentalism and social activism ==
Wright campaigned in support of the conservation of the Great Barrier Reef and Fraser Island. With some of her friends, she helped found one of the earliest nature conservation movements.

She was also an advocate for Aboriginal land rights. Tom Shapcott, reviewing With Love and Fury, her posthumous collection of selected letters published in 2007, comments that her letter on this topic to the Australian prime minister John Howard was "almost brutal in its scorn". Shortly before her death, she attended a march in Canberra for reconciliation between non-indigenous Australians and the Aboriginal people.

== Awards ==
- 1975 – Christopher Brennan Award
- 1991 – Queen's Gold Medal for Poetry
- 1994 – Human Rights and Equal Opportunity Commission Poetry Award for Collected Poems

In 2009 as part of the Q150 celebrations, Judith Wright was announced as one of the Q150 Icons of Queensland for her role as an "Influential Artists".

== Death and legacy ==
Wright died in Canberra on 25 June 2000, aged 85.

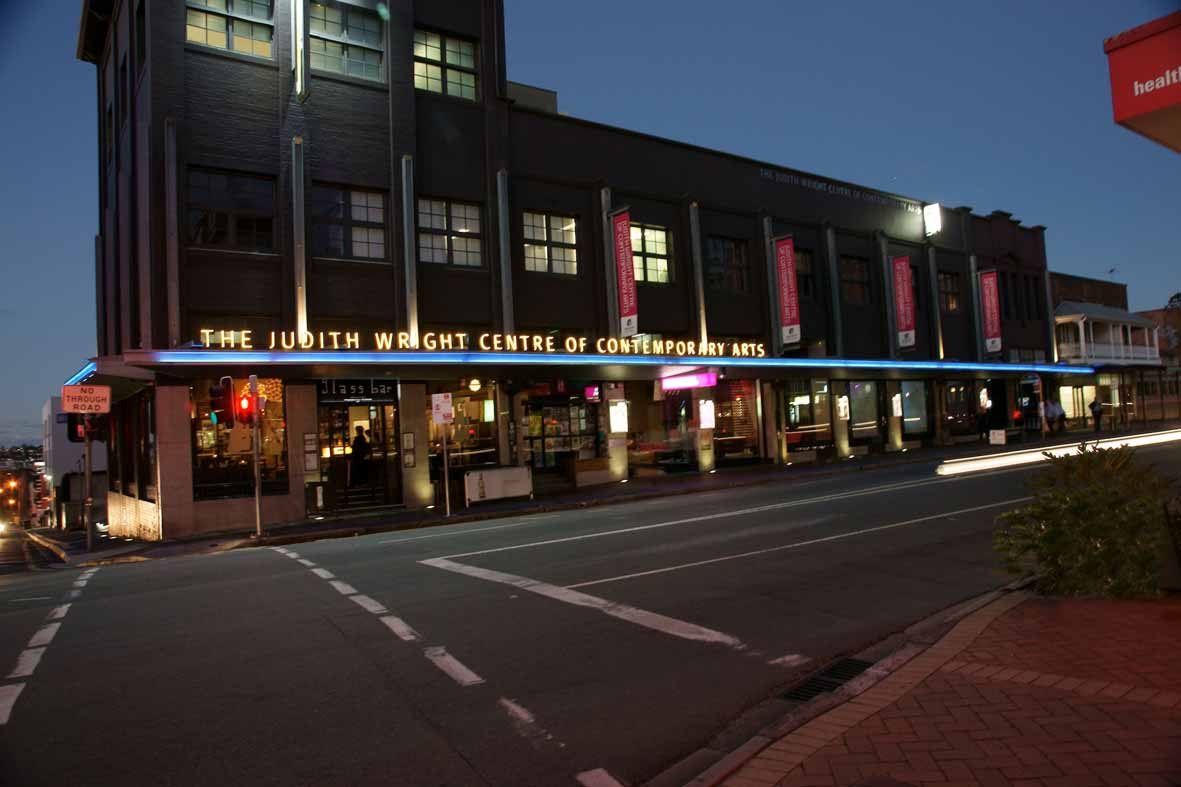
The Judith Wright Arts Centre in Fortitude Valley, Australia

In June 2006 the Australian Electoral Commission (AEC) announced that the new federal electorate in Queensland, which was to be created at the 2007 federal election, would be named Wright in honour of her accomplishments as a "poet and in the areas of arts, conservation and indigenous affairs in Queensland and Australia". However, in September 2006 the AEC announced it would name the seat after John Flynn, the founder of the Royal Flying Doctor Service, due to numerous objections from people fearing the name Wright may be linked to disgraced former Queensland ALP MP Keith Wright. Under the 2009 redistribution of Queensland, a new seat in southeast Queensland was created and named in Wright's honour; it was first contested in 2010.

The Judith Wright Arts Centre in Fortitude Valley, Brisbane, is named after her.

On 2 January 2008, it was announced that a future suburb in the district of Molonglo Valley, Canberra would be named "Wright". There is a street in the Canberra suburb of Franklin named after her, as well. Another of the Molonglo Valley suburbs was named after Wright's lover, "Nugget" Coombs.

The Judith Wright Award was awarded as part of the ACT Poetry Award by the ACT Government between 2005 and 2011, for a published book of poems by an Australian poet.

The Judith Wright Poetry Prize for New and Emerging Poets (worth A$20,000), was established in 2007 by Overland magazine.

The Judith Wright Calanthe Award has been awarded as part of the Queensland Premier's Literary Awards since 2004.

== Bibliography ==
=== Poetry ===
==== Collections ====
- The Moving Image (1946)
- Woman to Man (1949)
- — (1953). The moving image (2nd ed.). Melbourne: Meanjin Press.
- The Gateway (1953)
- The Two Fires (1955)
- Australian Bird Poems (1961)
- Birds: Poems, Angus and Robertson, 1962; Birds: Poems. National Library Australia. 2003. ISBN 978-0-642-10774-9.
- Five Senses: Selected Poems (1963)
- Selected Poems (1963)
- The Other Half : Poems (1966)
- The Nature of Love(1966)
- Collected Poems 1942-1970 (1971)
- Alive: Poems 1971–72 (1973)
- Poets On Record 9 (University of Queensland Press, 1973) Selected works, issued with a 7" record of Wright reading her own poems.
- Fourth Quarter and Other Poems (1976)
- The Double Tree: Selected Poems 1942–76 (1978)
- Phantom Dwelling (1985)
- Five Senses: Selected Poems (1989)
- A Human Pattern: Selected Poems (1990) ISBN 1-875892-17-6
- The Flame Tree (1993)
- Collected poems, 1942–1985, Angus & Robertson (1994) ISBN 978-0-207-18135-1
- Grace and Other Poems (2009)
- Tamborine Mountain Poems of Judith Wright (2010)
- Poemas escogidos, Pre-textos, 2020, ISBN 978-84-18178-33-7 (Spanish translation by José Luis Fernández Castillo)

==== Selected list of poems ====
Title	Year	First published	Reprinted/collected in
"Remittance Man"	1944	The Bulletin, 15 March 1944, p4	The Moving Image by Judith Wright, Meanjin Press, 1946, p. 17
"For New England"	1944	Meanjin, Winter 1944, p91	The Moving Image by Judith Wright, Meanjin Press, 1946, pp. 31-32
"Bullocky"	1944	The Bulletin, 27 September 1944, p2	The Moving Image by Judith Wright, Meanjin Press, 1946, p. 25
"Country Town"	1944	The Bulletin, 20 December 1944, p22	The Moving Image by Judith Wright, Meanjin Press, 1946, p. 17
"The Surfer"	1945	The Bulletin, 21 March 1945, p4	The Moving Image by Judith Wright, Meanjin Press, 1946 pp. 30
"South of My Days"	1945	The Bulletin, 8 August 1945, p2	The Moving Image by Judith Wright, Meanjin Press, 1946 pp. 28-29
"Woman to Child"	1946	Meanjin Papers, Autumn 1946	Woman to Man by Judith Wright, Angus and Robertson, 1949 p. 3
"Woman to Man"	1946	Meanjin Papers, Spring 1946	Woman to Man by Judith Wright, Angus and Robertson, 1949 p. 1
"Flame-Tree in a Quarry"	1947	The Bulletin, 3 December 1947, p2	Woman to Man by Judith Wright, Angus and Robertson, 1949 p. 47
"The Killer"	1947	Southerly, December 1947	Woman to Man by Judith Wright, Angus and Robertson, 1949 p. 34
"Train Journey"	1948	Meanjin, Winter 1948	The Gateway by Judith Wright, Angus and Robertson, 1953 p. 6
"Legend"	1950	The Bulletin, 13 December 1950	The Gateway by Judith Wright, Angus and Robertson, 1953 pp. 39-40
"Eroded Hills" (aka "Inheritor")	1951	The Bulletin, 19 September 1951,	The Gateway by Judith Wright, Angus and Robertson, 1953 p. 12
"At Cooloolah"	1954	The Bulletin, 7 July 1954, p20	The Two Fires by Judith Wright, Angus and Robertson, 1955 p. 30
"The Two Fires"	1954	Ern Malley's Journal, November 1954, pp14-15	The Two Fires by Judith Wright, Angus and Robertson, 1955 pp. 1-2
"For My Daughter"	1956	Wright, Judith (Summer 1956–1957). "For my daughter". Quadrant. 1 (1): 34.	Five Senses : Selected Poems by Judith Wright, Angus and Robertson, 1963 p. 6
"Eve to Her Daughters"	1966		The Other Half : Poems by Judith Wright, Angus and Robertson, 1966 p. 25-26
"Naked Girl and Mirror"	1966		The Other Half : Poems by Judith Wright, Angus and Robertson, 1966 p. 34

=== Literary criticism ===
- William Baylebridge and the modern problem (Canberra University College, 1955)
- Charles Harpur (1963)
- Preoccupations in Australian Poetry (1965)
- The Poet's Pen (1965) (an anthology of poetry selected by Wright with A.K. Thomson)
- Henry Lawson (Great Australians Series) (1967)
- Because I Was Invited (1975)
- Going on Talking (1991) ISBN 0-947333-43-6

=== Other works ===
- Kings of the Dingoes (1958) Oxford University Press, Melbourne
- The Generations of Men, illustrated by Alison Forbes (1959) ISBN 1-875892-16-8
- Range the Mountains High (1962)
- The Nature of Love (1966) Sun Books, Melbourne
- "The Battle of the Biosphere" (Outlook magazine article 1970)
- Witnesses of spring: unpublished poems of Shaw Neilson, edited by Wright, with poems selected by Wright and Val Vallis, from material selected by Ruth Harrison (1970)
- The Coral Battleground (1977)
- The Cry for the Dead (1981)
- We Call for a Treaty (1985)
- Born of the Conquerors: Selected Essays. Aboriginal Studies Press. 1991. ISBN 978-0-85575-217-0.
- Half a Lifetime (Text, 2001) ISBN 1-876485-78-7
- Judith Wright: Selected Writings (2022) ed. Georgina Arnott, La Trobe University Press & Black Inc ISBN 9781760642624

=== Letters ===
- The Equal Heart and Mind: Letters between Judith Wright and Jack McKinney edited by Patricia Clarke and Meredith McKinney (UQP, 2004) ISBN 0-7022-3441-9
- With Love and Fury: Selected letters of Judith Wright edited by Patricia Clarke and Meredith McKinney (National Library of Australia, 2006) ISBN 978-0-642-27625-4
- Portrait of a friendship: the letters of Barbara Blackman and Judith Wright, 1950–2000 edited by Bryony Cosgrove (Miegunyah Press, 2007) ISBN 978-0-522-85355-1, ISBN 0-522-85355-2

== See also ==
- List of Australian poets
- With Love and Fury 2016 album by Brodsky Quartet and Katie Noonan, setting words of Wright to music
