= 1945 in Australian literature =

This article presents a list of the historical events and publications of Australian literature during 1945.

== Events ==
- June – Ern Malley hoax: Australia's most celebrated literary hoax takes place when Angry Penguins is published with poems by the fictional Ern Malley. Poets James McAuley and Harold Stewart created the poems from lines of other published work and then sent them as the purported work of a recently deceased poet. The hoax is played on Max Harris, at this time a 22-year-old avant garde poet and critic who had started the modernist magazine Angry Penguins. Harris and his circle of literary friends agreed that a hitherto completely unknown modernist poet of great merit had come to light in suburban Australia. The Autumn 1944 edition of the magazine with the poems comes out in mid-1945 due to wartime printing delays with cover illustration by Sidney Nolan. An Australian newspaper uncovers the hoax within weeks. McAuley and Stewart loved early Modernist poets but despise later modernism and especially the well-funded Angry Penguins and are jealous of Harris's precocious success.

== Books ==
- Eleanor Dark – The Little Company
- Michael Innes – Appleby's End
- Will Lawson – The Lady of the Heather
- Jack Lindsay – Hullo Stranger
- Norman Lindsay – The Cousin from Fiji
- Nevil Shute – Most Secret
- F. J. Thwaites – Out of the Dawn
- Arthur Upfield – Death of a Swagman
- Morris West – Moon in My Pocket

== Short stories ==
- A. Bertram Chandler – "Giant Killer"
- Alan Marshall – "Wild Red Horses"
- Dal Stivens – "The Man Who Bowled Victor Trumper"

== Children's and Young Adult fiction ==
- Ruth C. Williams
  - Our Friend Rodney
  - Pirate's Gold

== Poetry ==
- Emily Bulcock – From Quenchless Springs
- Hugh McCrae – Voice of the Forest: Poems
- J. S. Manifold – "The Tomb of Lt. John Learmonth, AIF"
- Ian Mudie – Poems: 1934-1944
- Colin Thiele – Splinters and Shards: Poems
- David McKee Wright – The Station Ballads and Other Verses
- Judith Wright
  - "South of My Days"
  - "The Surfer"

== Drama ==
=== Radio ===
- Dymphna Cusack – Lure of the Inland Sea
- Morris West – The Mask of Marius Melville

=== Theatre ===
- Dymphna Cusack and Miles Franklin – Call Up Your Ghosts

== Awards and honours ==
=== Literary ===
Award	Author	Title	Publisher
ALS Gold Medal	Not awarded		

== Births ==
A list, ordered by date of birth (and, if the date is either unspecified or repeated, ordered alphabetically by surname) of births in 1945 of Australian literary figures, authors of written works or literature-related individuals follows, including year of death.

- 2 January – Diane Fahey, poet
- 7 February – Jill Jolliffe, journalist and non-fiction writer (died 2022)
- 15 February – Jack Dann, novelist and editor (in USA)
- 23 February – Robert Gray, poet (died 2025)
- 19 March – Mark O'Connor, poet
- 6 April – Peter Skrzynecki, poet (in Germany)
- 2 June – Michael Leunig, cartoonist and poet (died 2024)
- 7 October – Hal Colebatch, poet and novelist (died 2019)
- 5 December – Joanne Burns, poet

Unknown date

- Hazel Edwards, writer for children
- Robert J. Merritt, playwright (died 2011)

== Deaths ==
A list, ordered by date of death (and, if the date is either unspecified or repeated, ordered alphabetically by surname) of deaths in 1945 of Australian literary figures, authors of written works or literature-related individuals follows, including year of birth.

- 10 March – G. B. Lancaster, novelist (born 1873)
- 21 March — William Gosse Hay, author and essayist (born 1875)
- 2 July – J. L. Ranken, poet and novelist (born 1878)
- 10 July – Jack Moses, poet (born 1861)
- 5 November – Norma Davis, poet (born 1905)

== See also ==
- 1945 in Australia
- 1945 in literature
- 1945 in poetry
- List of years in Australian literature
- List of years in literature
