= 1943 in Australian literature =

This article presents a list of the historical events and publications of Australian literature during 1943.

== Books ==
- Max Harris – The Vegetative Eye
- Michael Innes – The Weight of the Evidence
- G. B. Lancaster – Grand Parade
- Philip Lindsay – The Devil and King John
- Kylie Tennant
  - Ride on Stranger
  - Time Enough Later

== Children's ==
- May Gibbs – Mr. & Mrs. Bear and Friends
- P. L. Travers – Mary Poppins Opens the Door

== Short stories ==
- Marjorie Barnard – The Persimmon Tree and Other Stories
- James Hackston – "Father Clears Out"
- Myra Morris – "Going Home"
- Dal Stivens – "The Perch"

== Poetry ==
- David Campbell
  - "Men in Green"
  - "Soldier's Song"
  - "The Stockman"
- Norma Davis — "Awakening"
- Rosemary Dobson – "Child with a Cockatoo"
- A. D. Hope – "Observation Car"
- Rex Ingamells – New Song in an Old Land (edited)
- Will Lawson – Bush Verses
- Kenneth Slessor – "A Bushranger"
- Douglas Stewart – "The Dosser in Springtime"
- Judith Wright – "The Trains"

== Drama ==
=== Theatre ===
- Dymphna Cusack – Comets Soon Pass
- Sumner Locke Elliott – Your Obedient Servant

== Awards and honours ==
=== Literary ===
Award	Author	Title	Publisher
ALS Gold Medal	Not awarded		

== Births ==
A list, ordered by date of birth (and, if the date is either unspecified or repeated, ordered alphabetically by surname) of births in 1943 of Australian literary figures, authors of written works or literature-related individuals follows, including year of death.

- 9 January – Robert Drewe, novelist
- 15 February – Ian Heads, historian and journalist (died 2024)
- 14 April – Lyndall Ryan, historian (died 2024)
- 29 April – John Tranter, poet, publisher and editor (died 2023)
- 30 April – Paul Jennings, writer for children (born in England)
- 7 May – Peter Carey, novelist
- 17 May – Robert Adamson, poet (died 2022)
- 19 June – Barry Hill, poet and journalist
- 16 August –
  - Dennis Altman, author and academic
  - Roberta Sykes, author and poet (died 2010)
- 24 August – Judith Clarke, writer for children and young adults (died 2020)
- 22 September – Dale Spender, author (died 2023)

== Deaths ==
A list, ordered by date of death (and, if the date is either unspecified or repeated, ordered alphabetically by surname) of deaths in 1943 of Australian literary figures, authors of written works or literature-related individuals follows, including year of birth.

- 3 October – Ida Lee, historian and poet (born 1865)
- 27 November – Louis Esson, poet and playwright (born 1878)

== See also ==
- 1943 in Australia
- 1943 in literature
- 1943 in poetry
- List of years in Australian literature
- List of years in literature
