= Caddie, A Sydney Barmaid =

1953 book

First edition (publ. Constable)

Caddie, A Sydney Barmaid is the fictionally embellished autobiography of Catherine Beatrice (Caddie) Edmonds, who worked as a barmaid in Sydney during the Great Depression. Published anonymously in 1953 under Edmonds' nickname, which was coined by a lover who likened her to "the sleek body and class of his Cadillac motorcar", Caddie attracted wide critical acclaim upon its original publication in London, and became a bestseller when it was adapted into a feature film in 1976, one year after International Women's Year.

== Author and origins ==
The book's anonymous author, Catherine Beatrice Edmonds (1900–1960), was employed for some years from 1945 as a charwoman by authors Dymphna Cusack and Florence James at their cottage in the Blue Mountains. At the time, Cusack and James were working on their epic collaborative novel, Come In Spinner. Edmonds initially took the job in the hope that the authors would write her story. Entertained by Edmonds' turn of phrase and her stories of working as a barmaid during the Depression, Cusack and James encouraged and coached her through seven drafts of an autobiography until 1952.

Edmonds had been born in Penrith on 11 November 1900 to an Irish born father and a Scottish born mother. Edmonds married Frederick George Holloway (represented as 'Jon Marsh' in the book) on 25 January 1919 at St Stephen's Church, Newtown. The couple had two children in the early years of the marriage: a son named Ronald, and a daughter named Catherine. The couple were divorced in Sydney on 20 December 1929.

She married again on 24 February 1934 to Arthur John Baden Surenne at the Methodist Church at Marrickville. This marriage lasted until 1948 when the couple divorced. She later changed her surname by deed poll to Elliott-Mackay.

Edmonds chose to write under a pseudonym because she was publicity-shy. John Ritchie's entry in the Australian Dictionary of Biography describes her as plump, round-faced, with "narrow, grey-blue eyes, 'wavy, light brown hair streaked with grey', and deeply-graven lines at the corners of her mouth". Caddie Edmonds died of a heart attack on 16 April 1960 at her home in Regentville in Sydney. She was buried in Penrith General Cemetery and was survived by a son and a daughter.

== Plot summary ==
The book tells the story of Caddie, starting with her birth in Penrith, New South Wales, in 1900 to a family living in poverty. They move to railway camps at Glenbrook in the Blue Mountains where her drunken father works as a railway fettler. His abuse becomes worse when her mother dies in childbirth and her brother is killed at the Gallipoli landing. To escape her family, she moves to Sydney to work as a shop assistant with her friend, Esther, while still a young woman. She meets and marries a middle-class man, Jon Marsh, and has two children by him. She feels constrained by the control taken by her mother-in-law, living next door, who treats her as undeserving of her son, as Caddie is not "pure merino" (i.e., with only free-settler, not convict, forebears). Caddie leaves when she discovers Jon's sexual relationship with Esther. Jon and his mother endeavour to retain custody of the children, although Caddie believes this is really only to spite her.

Caddie moves to the first available cheap accommodation, only to find that the premises are mainly inhabited by prostitutes. Caddie finds better-paid work as a barmaid, a morally suspect position—her first employer tells her to shorten her dress, for example, because "she was an artwork, and he liked his artwork on display." She places her children in the care of a church-run home, having tried leaving them with carers who mistreated and neglected them. She visits weekly, often with her barmaid friend, Leslie. When the Depression hits, tips are less common and both women's incomes fall dramatically. Through Leslie, Caddie meets a Greek immigrant and business owner, Peter, with whom she establishes a loving relationship, with Peter buying gifts for weekend visits with Caddie's children. Caddie and Peter are distressed when Peter's estranged wife and ailing father call him back to Greece to run the family business. The couple corresponds, with Peter reporting that his attempts to divorce his wife have been unsuccessful.

With the effects of the Depression deepening, Caddie takes additional work by running tabs for the pub's SP bookmaker. She regains custody of her children and rents a house, furnishing it with fruit cases for chairs. She befriends Bill "the Rabbittoh" (rabbit seller), Sonny his brother and their parents, and Bill helps her sign up for the dole (sustenance food provisions meant for those without income). Caddie saves some money when she starts running the SP books herself, the bookmaker having moved on to legal bookmaking at the racecourse. Caddie decides to leave the city, having been offered work on a farm. She moves house to share with Bill the rabbittoh for a week, to save rent before moving to mountains for other work, but remains there when the work offer is withdrawn. She emotionally supports, and is supported by, Bill's family, including caring for his elderly father before his death. Around this time, Peter's wife dies, and Peter asks Caddie to migrate. Caddie feels unable to do this, but Peter is tied to Greece to keep the business alive.

The story ends in tragedy when Peter returns, following the death of his wife, and the couple is finally able to make plans to marry. When he buys a new car, he takes the whole family driving and dies in a tragic car crash when swerving to avoid collision with a truck, only four days before their planned wedding.

Caddie makes a chance reacquaintance with Esther, who has been deserted by John, and has contracted tuberculosis. Against her wishes, Caddie's son enlists at the outbreak of World War II. Bill and Sonny go "on the wallaby track", searching remote areas for subsistence work.

== Characters ==
Caddie - central character and first person author, whose true name is not revealed in the book
Terry - Caddie's son
Anne - Caddie's daughter
Esther - Caddie's friend
Leslie - friend, barmaid
Jon Marsh - Caddie's husband, estranged for much of the story
Ted - SP Bookie for whom Caddie keeps tabs
Peter - Caddie's Greek immigrant lover
Bill "the Rabbitoh" - friend and supporter in latter phase of story
Sonny - brother of Bill

== Major themes ==
The book documents one woman's version of her experiences of the Great Depression, highlighting her battle to maintain her respectability while ensuring she can support her children.

At the time, Australian bars were segregated on gender lines, so the barmaid was the only female present in the main bar. As a result, barmaids had a bad name because a woman working in such conditions was regarded as morally suspect, perhaps luring men into spending their money in bars, perhaps soliciting commercial sex. Indeed, Caddie makes reference to the numerous sexual advances made towards her, both in her role as barmaid and in situations where it would benefit her, such as from the teacher at her children's school. She shows how she remained morally respectable in this regard, and shows how her other illegal activities - SP bookmaking, signing up for multiple welfare payments - were for the benefit of her family and friends.

The story makes reference to the six o'clock swill, written at a time shortly after the war when it was presumed that the reader would be familiar with the phenomenon. In an effort to minimise alcohol consumption, the Australian government legislated that bars were to close at 6pm. The result was an extreme rush between 5pm and 6pm.

Cusack notes how Caddie was reluctant to give any signs of complaint, but to take everything in her stride in order to meet the needs of her children. Cusack had Caddie rewrite the book several times in order to give more detail of the difficulties she faced and her feelings about them. The stoic strength of an Australian single woman "battler" is an underlying theme to the story.

== Publishing details ==
The book was published in May 1953 by Constable & Co. Ltd in London to glowing reviews. By September it had been reprinted three times, although, at this stage, it was not a best seller. It was eventually published in Australia in 1966. The film adaptation in 1976 led to a resurgence in the book's popularity and bestseller status, with seven reprints that year, sixteen years after Caddie's death.

== Film adaptation ==
Adapted for film in 1976, the film Caddie was a commercial and critical success, making nearly A$3m on a budget of A$400,000, and winning a San Sebastian Film Festival award. It was produced by Anthony Buckley and supported by, among other organisations, the International Women's Year Secretariat and Australian Film Commission’s Women's Film Fund. It launched the careers of Jacki Weaver as Josie and Helen Morse in the title role of Caddie for which she won the AFI Best Actress award. It also starred Takis Emmanuel as Peter, Jack Thompson as Ted, Melissa Jaffer as Leslie, Ron Blanchard as Bill and Drew Forsythe as Sonny.

The screenplay skips Caddie's impoverished early life, implying she was from a middle-class background.
