= Joan Long =

Australian producer, writer and director

Joan Long AM
- Born: Joan Dorothy Boundy; 20 July 1925; Rushworth, Victoria, Australia
- Died: 2 January 1999 (aged 73); Sydney, New South Wales, Australia
- Occupations: Writer, Producer, Director
- Spouse: Martin Long
- Children: 4

Joan Long AM (born Joan Dorothy Boundy; 20 July 1925 – 2 January 1999) was an Australian producer, writer and director best known for Caddie (1976). She was awarded as a Member of the Order of Australia in 1980 for her services to the film industry.

== Early life ==
Joan Dorothy Boundy was born on 20 July 1925 in Rushworth, Victoria, the daughter of Katherine and Frances Boundy. She was brought up in a Methodist family and shared her childhood with four other siblings. Long went to Geelong High School and graduated from the University of Melbourne with a bachelor's degree in History. In 1948, Long made the decision of moving to Sydney, in order to pursue a career in film.

She started working at the Department of Interior (DOI)’s new film division, the Australian National Film Board. She was working as a secretary. Her main role was to assist producer Stanley Hawse.

She eventually started her direction debut in 1952 with a series of short documentaries and, in the process, became the second woman, after Catherine Duncan, to take on this role in the Commonwealth Film Unit, previously known as the Australian National Film Board.

After her marriage with Martin Long, she went on a 10-year break, in order to care for her two stepsons and her own son and daughter. She eventually came back to the Commonwealth Film Unit, and with her family in mind, she opted to work as a freelance scriptwriter rather than a full-time employee. However it was a decision that was frowned upon by certain people in her entourage: ¨What they said to my face was only a fraction of what they said to my back – you still get people who criticize the fact [that] you work […] No one questions a man's right to work or that his career should go on. Whereas women have had to justify their right to work.¨

== Career ==
=== 1968-71: The Pictures That Moved, Paddington Lace and The Passionate Industry ===
Both The Pictures That Moved: Australian Cinema 1896-1920 (1968) and The Passionate Industry: 1920-1930 (1971) were documentaries portraying the evolution of the Australian film industry the movies were a compilation of different excerpts of newsreels, features and photographs of the addressed periods. She also interviewed several actors who played or participated in these pictures. The two films were chosen to be among the Official Selections (Out of Competition category), at the 30th Cannes Film Festival, in 1977.

She also wrote Paddington Lace (1970), a film that depicts one of Sydney's oldest suburbs, Paddington, a place that eventually became "Sydney's artist colony".

=== 1975-77: Caddie and The Picture Show Man ===
She eventually left the Film Unit and the documentary field in order to pursue the fiction route.

Joan Long wrote the screenplay for Caddie (1976), which was based on the autobiography of Catherine ''Caddie'' Edmond, Caddie, A Sydney Barmaid. The story loosely recounted the life of Caddie Marsh as she desperately tried to hold her life together by getting a job as a barmaid in order to support her two kids, during the Great Depression in Sydney. The film is both a critique of the male-dominated society and its scrutiny on women, and a highlight on the implications of being a working-class single-mother during this period in time.

The film was done as part of Australia's participation in the International Women's Year. Caddie (1976) received a total of $390,000 in funding ($50,000 from the government) for its production. The film won 3 feature awards at the 18th Australian Film Institute Awards. Long's script was nominated for Best Original Screenplay, but lost to Fred Schepisi's The Devil's Playground.

Long founded the company Limelight Productions in 1975 and under its name, she continued to tackle subject matters related to the film industry. She started working on a script revolving around the adventure of a picture showman who travelled across the countryside to bring motion pictures to those who could not access them. The screenplay eventually became The Picture Show Man (1977) which she also worked on as producer. Additionally, the film was also her reaction to Caddie, "[she] wanted something light-hearted" that would get her mind away from the heaviness of her previous work.

=== 1978-1988: Transition from writer to producer ===
After The Picture Show Man, Long continued on her path as a producer and worked on various other films, with an emphasis on social justice and gender issues.

She worked as a producer with Margaret Kelly on Puberty Blues (1981), an adaptation of Kathy Lette and Gabrielle Carey's book of the same name. The film is a coming of age story that follows two teenage girls in their important life stage. The feature also tackles different themes such as sex, drugs, school, etc.

She was involved in Silver City (1984) which was directed and originally written by Sophia Turkiewicz. After having seen the young filmmaker's previous work Letter from Poland (1978), Long tried to bring one of Turkiewicz's other scripts, written in 1974, to the screen. After several modifications done on the original screenplay, Long decided to bring Australian playwright Tom Keneally on board to help forge a story. Eventually, on their eleventh draft, they got green-lit with a story that depicted the Polish post-war refugees' journey to Australia, after World War II, focusing on a time that greatly shaped the nation's current multiculturalism. The film addressed different themes such as identity, assimilation, culture, and ultimately, revolved around the refugees’ relation and interaction with their new home. The film screened throughout Australia, Europe and the United States.

== Other roles ==
Long became the first female president of the Australian Writers Guild (AWG), in 1972. During that same year's inquiry into the Australian film industry, Long who represented the AWG, was one of the two women present among the 99 witnesses, and was, at one point, mistaken for a secretary by one of the male witnesses.

She had also made it a mission of hers to preserve the industry's history. In 1984, she was appointed head for the National Film and Sound Archive's first Advisory Committee.

== Recognition ==
Long received three AWGIE Award, for the films The Pictures That Moved: Australian Cinema 1896-1920 (1968) and The Passionate Industry: 1920-1930 (1971), and Paddington Lace (1970).

In recognition of her contributions, she received the AWG's Dorothy Crawford Award in 1991, and was given the Venus Award by the Women in Film and Television, in 1997.

== Personal life ==
She married Martin Long, and they had a son and a daughter, and their family included his two sons.

== Death and legacy ==
Long died in Sydney on 2 January 1999.

Jennie Boddington wrote a eulogy for her long-time friend and colleague in which she described Joan as a "fire ball", with a "spirit of obligation, of service, of giving herself to the community" Even during her final years, she was supposedly working on a screenplay for a documentary about Australia's famous pioneers of the silent-era, the McDonagh sisters (Paulette, Phyllis and Isabella).

== Select credits ==
- The Pictures That Moved (1968) (documentary) - writer
- Paddington Lace (1970) (documentary) - writer
- The Passionate Industry (1971) (documentary) - director, writer
- Caddie (1976) - writer
- The Picture Show Man (1977) - writer, producer
- Puberty Blues (1981) - producer
- Silver City (1984) - producer
- Emerald City (1988) - producer
