= Mary Reibey =

Australian businesswoman

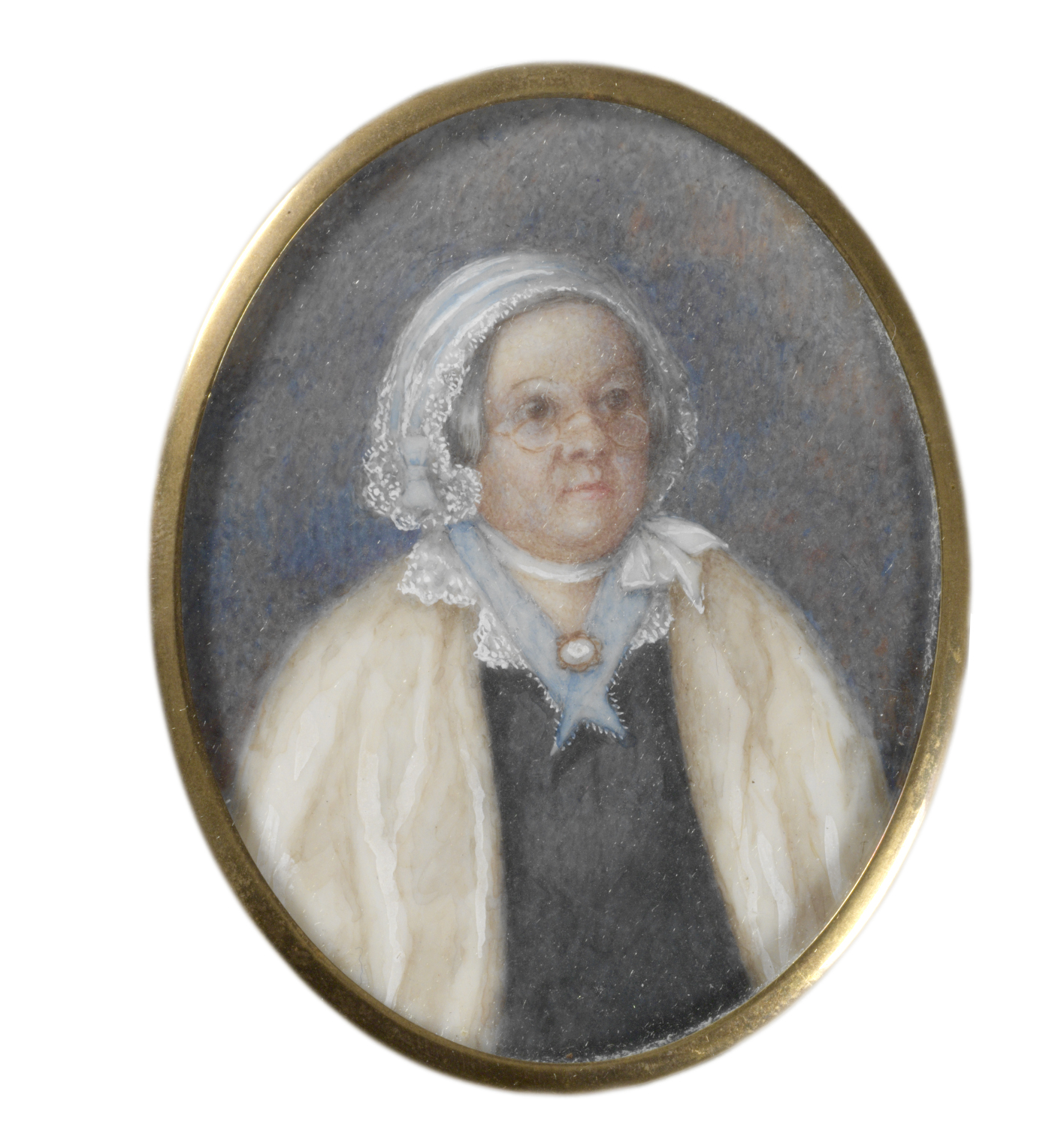
- Portrait of Reibey, miniature watercolour on ivory, dated around 1835
- Born: Molly Haydock; 12 May 1777; Bury, Lancashire, England, United Kingdom
- Died: 30 May 1855 (aged 78); Newtown, New South Wales, Australia
- Resting place: Sandhills Cemetery, then La Perouse Cemetery
- Occupation: Businesswoman
- Years active: 1792−1836
- Spouse: Thomas Reibey (m. 1794; died 1811)

Mary Reibey (née Haydock; 12 May 1777 – 30 May 1855) was an English-born merchant, shipowner and trader who was transported to Australia as a convict. After gaining her freedom, she was viewed by her contemporaries as a community role model and became legendary as a successful businesswoman in the colony.

== Early life ==
Reibey, baptised Molly Haydock, was born on 12 May 1777 in Bury, Lancashire, England. Following the death of her parents, she was reared by her grandmother and sent into service. She ran away and was arrested for stealing a horse in August 1791. At the time, she was disguised as a boy and was going under the name of James Burrow. Sentenced to seven years' transportation, she arrived in Sydney, Australia, on the Royal Admiral in October 1792.

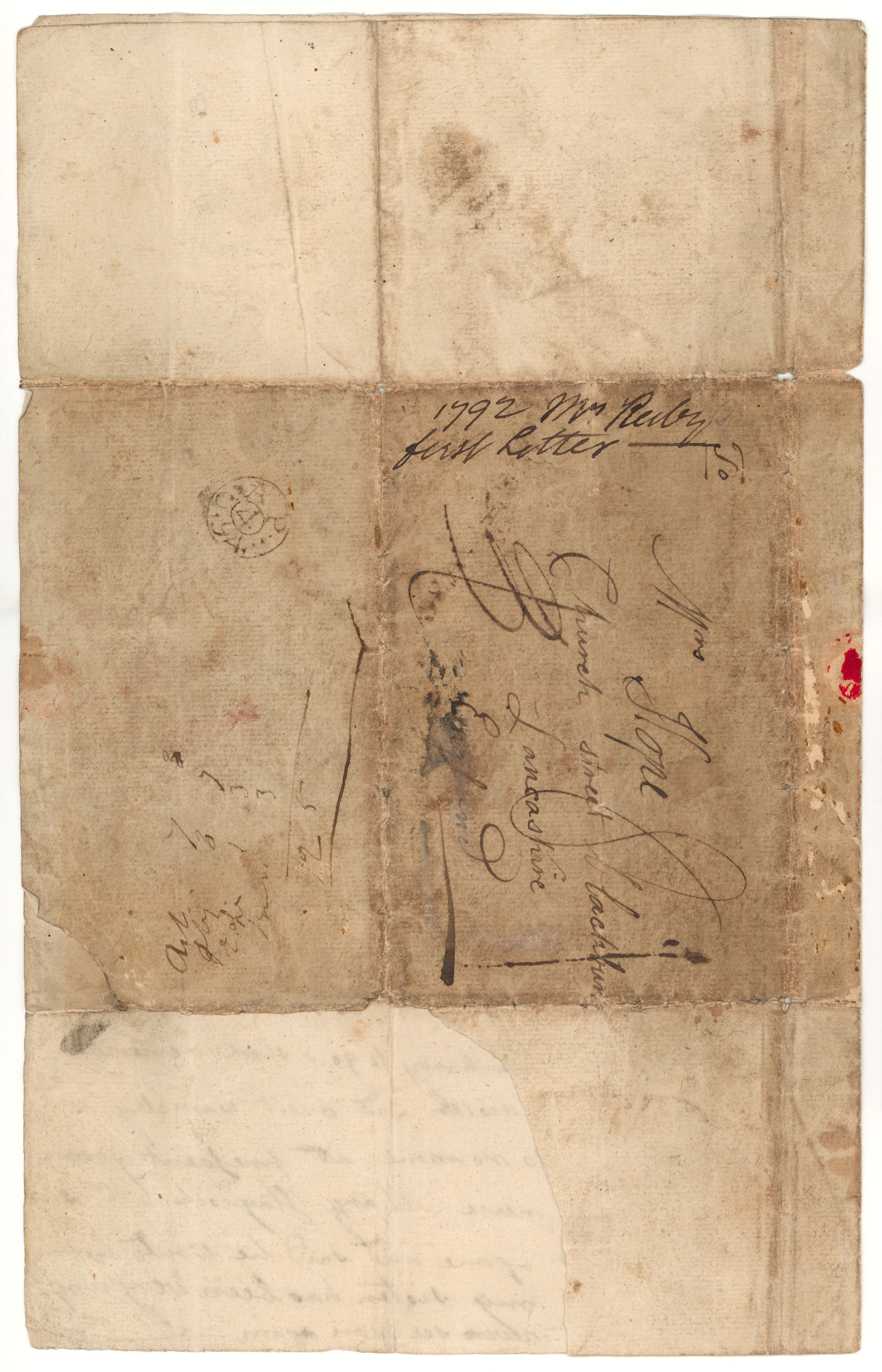
Letter written by Reibey to her aunt Penelope Hope. Written from on board the ship the day after arriving in Botany Bay, Sydney, on 8 October 1792.

== Life and career in Australia ==
On 7 September 1794, 17-year-old Mary married Thomas Reibey, after he had proposed to her several times; she finally agreed to marry the junior officer on the store ship Britannia. Reibey also used the surnames Raiby, Reiby and Reibey interchangeably; the family adopted the spelling Reibey in later years. Thomas Reibey was granted land on the Hawkesbury River, where he and Mary lived and farmed following their marriage. They built a farmhouse called Reibycroft, which is now listed on the Register of the National Estate.

Thomas Reibey commenced a cargo business along the Hawkesbury River to Sydney and later moved to Sydney. Thomas Reibey's business undertakings prospered, enabling him in 1804 to build a substantial stone residence on a further grant of land near Macquarie Place. He acquired several farms on the Hawkesbury River and traded in coal, cedar, furs and skins. He entered into a partnership with Edward Wills, and trading activities were extended to the Bass Strait, the Pacific Islands and, from 1809, to China and India.

When Thomas Reibey died on 5 April 1811, Mary assumed sole responsibility for the care of seven children and the control of numerous business enterprises. She was no stranger to this task, having managed her husband's affairs during his frequent absences from Sydney. Now a woman of considerable wealth through her husband's businesses, Reibey continued to expand her business interests. In 1812, she opened a new warehouse in George Street and, in 1817, extended her shipping operations with the purchase of further vessels. In the same year, the Bank of New South Wales was founded in her house in Macquarie Place.

By 1828, when she gradually retired from active involvement in commerce, she had acquired extensive property holdings in the city. Like many others, however, she was on occasion somewhat economical with the truth. In March 1820, she returned to England with her daughters to visit her native village and came back to Sydney the next year. So in the 1828 census, when asked to describe her condition, she declared that she "came free in 1821".

In the emancipist Society of New South Wales, she gained respect for her charitable works and her interest in the church and education. She was one of the founding Governors of the Free Grammar School in 1825.

Reibey built a cottage in the suburb of Hunters Hill, New South Wales, circa 1836, where she lived for some time. The cottage, situated on the shores of the Lane Cove River, was later acquired by the Joubert brothers, who enlarged it. It is now known as Fig Tree House and is listed on the (now defunct) Register of the National Estate.

On her retirement, she built a house at Newtown, Sydney, where she lived until her death on 30 May 1855 from pneumonia. She was 78 years old. She was buried at the Sandhills Cemetery, and, when that was resumed, moved to the cemetery at La Perouse. A memorial for Reibey is in the Pioneer Memorial Park in Botany Cemetery.

Reibey is featured on the obverse of Australian twenty-dollar notes printed since 1994 and on its replacement design since 2019. Additionally, Reibey was posthumously inducted onto the Victorian Honour Roll of Women in 2001.

Obverse of the Australian $20 note

One of Mary and Thomas Reibey's grandchildren, Thomas Reibey (1821–1912), was the premier of Tasmania from 1876 to 1877.

== In popular culture ==
At least three novels have been written based on her life:

- The novel Sara Dane (1954) by Catherine Gaskin, which has sold over 2 million copies, is only loosely factually accurate. It was made into a television mini-series in 1982, which added romantic entanglements and a second marriage for the title character, which did not occur for Mary Reibey .
- More accurate is the novel Mary Reibey by Kathleen Pullen.
- Nance Donkin's historical children's novel House by the Water (Angus and Robertson; Sydney, 1970; Penguin; Ringwood, 1973) tells part of Mary Reibey's story, but is no longer in print.

Donkin also wrote An Emancipist, illustrated by Jane Robinson (Melbourne: Oxford University Press, 1968), a biography of Mary Reibey, written for children.

Meg Keneally's novel The Wreck (2020 Zaffre, ISBN 978-1838771393) features a character, Mrs Molly Thistle, based loosely on Mary Reibey.

Grantlee Kieza's biography, The Remarkable Mrs Reibey was published in 2023.

She also inspired the TV musical Pardon Miss Westcott (1959) and her life was dramatised in the radio plays Fulfilment (1948) by Rex Rienits and Mary Reibey by Dymphna Cusack.

== See also ==
- List of convicts transported to Australia
- Sydney Cove West Archaeological Precinct
