= 1878 in Australian literature =

This article presents a list of the historical events and publications of Australian literature during 1878.

== Poetry ==
- G. Herbert Gibson — "The Free-Selector's Daughter"
- Henry Kendall
  - "The Names Upon a Stone : Inscribed to G. L. F."
  - "Narrara Creek"
- Peter Dodds McCormick — "Advance Australia Fair"
- John Boyle O'Reilly — "The Dukite Snake"
- James Brunton Stephens — "Marsupial Bill"
- Garnet Walch — "A Little Tin Plate"

== Short stories ==
- Jessie Catherine Couvreur — "The Rubria Ghost"

== Births ==
A list, ordered by date of birth (and, if the date is either unspecified or repeated, ordered alphabetically by surname) of births in 1878 of Australian literary figures, authors of written works or literature-related individuals follows, including year of death.

- 24 May — Mary Grant Bruce, writer for children (died 1958)
- 10 August — Louis Esson, poet and dramatist (died 1943)
- 13 October — Patrick Joseph Hartigan, priest and poet (died 1952)

Unknown date:

- J. L. Ranken, poet and novelist (died 1945)

== Deaths ==
A list, ordered by date of death (and, if the date is either unspecified or repeated, ordered alphabetically by surname) of deaths in 1878 of Australian literary figures, authors of written works or literature-related individuals follows, including year of birth.

- 8 August — John Dunmore Lang, poet and politician (born 1799)

== See also ==
- 1878 in Australia
- 1878 in literature
- 1878 in poetry
- List of years in Australian literature
- List of years in literature
