= Caddie (film) =

- DVD cover
- Directed by: Donald Crombie
- Written by: Joan Long
- Based on: Caddie, A Sydney Barmaid by Catherine Edmonds
- Produced by: Anthony Buckley
- Starring: Helen Morse; Takis Emmanuel; Jack Thompson; Jacki Weaver
- Cinematography: Peter James
- Edited by: Tim Wellburn
- Music by: Patrick Flynn
- Production company: Anthony Buckley Productions
- Distributed by: Roadshow Films
- Release date: 1 April 1976
- Running time: 106 minutes
- Country: Australia
- Language: English
- Budget: A$400,000
- Box office: A$2,847,000 (Australia)

Caddie is a 1976 Australian biopic drama film directed by Donald Crombie and produced by Anthony Buckley. Released on 1 April 1976, it is representative of the Australian film renaissance which occurred during that decade. Set mainly in Sydney during the 1920s and 1930s, including the Great Depression, it portrays the life of a young middle class woman struggling to raise two children after her marriage breaks up. Based on Caddie, the Story of a Barmaid, a partly fictitious autobiography of Catherine Beatrice "Caddie" Edmonds, it made Helen Morse a local star and earned Jacki Weaver and Melissa Jaffer each an Australian Film Institute Award.

== Plot ==
In 1925 Sydney, Caddie leaves her adulterous and brutish husband and takes her two children, Ann and Terry, with her. Forced to work as a barmaid in a pub she struggles to survive. A brief affair with Ted (Jack Thompson) ends badly when his involvement with another woman comes to light, but she falls in love with a Greek immigrant, Peter (Takis Emmanuel). Peter has to return to Greece to face family obligations–he is already married to another woman. Caddie runs out of money and goes to work as a barmaid. Peter sends letters from Greece and Caddie has to evade police as she works for an SP bookie. Peter asks her to come to Athens but she decides to stay.

== Cast ==
- Helen Morse as Caddie Marsh
- Takis Emmanuel as Peter
- Jack Thompson as Ted
- Jacki Weaver as Josie
- Melissa Jaffer as Leslie
- Ron Blanchard as Bill
- Drew Forsythe as Sonny
- Kirily Nolan as Esther
- Lynette Curran as Maudie
- June Salter as Mrs Marks
- John Ewart as Paddy Reilly
- John Gaden as Solicitor
- Jane Harders as Vikki
- Phillip Hinton as Jon Marsh
- Mary Mackay as Mater
- Lucky Grills as Pawnbroker
- Robyn Nevin as Black Eye
- Vivienne Garrett
- Joy Hruby as Mrs. Sweeney
- Lorna Lesley as Maudie's friend
- Jan Adele as Daisy
- Sean Hinton as Terry Marsh, aged 10
- Marianne Howard as Anne Marsh, aged 7
- Reg Gorman as Male Drinker
- Liddy Clark as Receptionist
- Les Foxcroft as Mr Norris

== Production ==
The original autobiography was published in 1953. The real-life barmaid, Catherine Edmonds, got to know Dymphna Cusack while she was writing Come in Spinner and Cusack helped the book get published.

The budget was raised from the Australian Film Development Corporation, the Australian Women's Weekly, the Nine Network, the Secretariat for International Woman's Year, and Roadshow. Shooting began in late 1975. The film was made at the height of fame of Jack Thompson.

Parts of the movie were filmed in and around Balmain with a number of scenes at the Kent Hotel (which later became Caddies Restaurant) and the Sir William Wallace Hotel. Other scenes were filmed in Cameron Street, Edgecliff. Studio shots were taken at the Cinesound Studios in Rozelle. The writer and producer had both made films about early Australian cinema and were able to draw on this knowledge to help recreate Depression-era Sydney.

The motion picture soundtrack by Patrick Flynn was produced for release on CD by Philip Powers from the original analog tapes by 1M1 Records.

== Awards ==
Helen Morse's performance was awarded with the Australian Film Institute's Best Actress award in 1976.

Other AFI wins went for Best Actor in a Supporting Role (Drew Forsythe) and Best Actress in a Supporting Role (Melissa Jaffer and Jacki Weaver).

Australian Cinematographers Society awarded Peter James the Cinematographer of the Year award in 1977.

San Sebastián International Film Festival gave the Best Actress award to Helen Morse and the Special Prize of the Jury to Donald Crombie.
