= Spartacus (radio play) =

1942 Australian radio play by Dymphna Cusack

Spartacus is a 1942 Australian radio play by Dymphna Cusack about the rebel slave Spartacus. It was the last of the ABC's Bonus Competition Plays.

Cusack wrote it in 1940. She used the historical background to comment on present day issues.

The play was directed by John Cairns.

== Premise ==
"Tells of the great slave revolt against the tyranny of Rome in 73 B.C. It was a movement that began with the escape of a few slave-gladiators from arenas where they were forced to hack each other with swords for the benefit of a blood-lusting Roman crowd. Eventually more than 70,000 armed slaves were challenging the might of Rome. Such is history. But all through her play, Miss Cusack is keenly, almost poignantly, aware of parallels with our own momentous time. "
