= The Sun Is Not Enough =

1967 novel by Dymphna Cusack

The Sun is Not Enough
- Author: Dymphna Cusack
- Language: English
- Publisher: Heinemann, London
- Publication date: 1967
- Media type: Print (hardback & paperback)
- Pages: 315 pp
- Preceded by: Black Lightning
- Followed by: The Half-Burnt Tree

The Sun is Not Enough (1967) is a novel by Australian writer Dymphna Cusack.

== Plot summary ==
Martin Belford is a wealthy solicitor who lives with his sister Alice. Their world is disturbed when Carl von Rendt, an escaped Yugoslav war criminal, moves in next door. Carl is kidnapped by the Belford's gardener and charwoman with the intention of returning him to Europe to face justice. Martin and Alice discover the plot and have to decide if the kidnapping is justified or if Carl should be set free.

== Reviews ==
Helen Brown in The Canberra Times found much to enjoy in the book but also had reservations: "Miss Cusack's latest novel seems to me one of her best; readable as always and enjoyable because of the human warmth of its author...The Sun Is Not Enough is wholesome fare, a home grown thriller. It would make a good escapist film. But the flavour of truth is almost lost in the chunks of fat and gristle."

In a short review in The Western Herald the reviewer noted the book is "a warning of neo-Nazism spreading like a cancer within its unsuspecting host society, and events move fast and tension mounts to a dramatic climax as Dymphna Cusack's powerful story unfolds."

== See also ==
- 1967 in Australian literature
