= The Half-Burnt Tree =

1969 novel by Dymphna Cusack

- Author: Dymphna Cusack
- Language: English
- Publisher: Heinemann, London
- Publication date: 1969
- Media type: Print (hardback & paperback)
- Pages: 267 pp
- Preceded by: The Sun is Not Enough
- Followed by: A Bough in Hell

The Half-Burnt Tree (1969) is a novel by Australian writer Dymphna Cusack.

== Plot summary ==
The novel follows the story of three people living in the fictional NSW north-coast town of Doolinba: a man returned from Vietnam, scarred and damaged; the woman in charge of the local post office, embittered by marriage; and an indigenous boy, orphaned and afraid.

== Reviews ==
Hope Hewitt in The Canberra Times found the novel a little lacking in parts: "The Australian background is observed with affectionate care, factual and accurate as it should be, for it is important in the process of rehabilitation. The climax, is well prepared and handled with compassion. Yet the book achieves less than its intentions deserve...No doubt the generalisations within which the story works are intentional: the characters are nameless, "the man", "the woman", "the boy". We are intended to read the story as a general criticism of our society. But this undercuts the deep personal involvement with individuals which is Miss Cusack's strength."

== See also ==
- 1969 in Australian literature
