= Black Lightning (novel) =

1964 novel by Dymphna Cusack

- Author: Dymphna Cusack
- Language: English
- Publisher: Heinemann, Melbourne
- Publication date: 1964
- Media type: Print (hardback & paperback)
- Pages: 249 pp
- Preceded by: Picnic Races
- Followed by: The Sun is Not Enough

Black Lightning (1964) is a novel by Australian writer Dymphna Cusack.

== Plot summary ==
Tempe Caxton is an ageing television presenter who is recovering from a suicide attempt following the end of her career and the breakdown of a love affair. In hospital she learns that her dead son has left a part-Aboriginal child in a north coast town. The novel follows Caxton's journey of discovery into her own family's past and the living conditions of Australia's original inhabitants.

== Reviews ==
Writing in The Canberra Times Jean Battersby found that "Miss Cusack enters the fight with courage, sympathy and indignation, but without very much subtlety or skill...Art, properly exploited, is probably the most powerful ally of the social critic, for it allows objective argument to be translated into direct emotional experience. But its disciples must be observed ... its special ways of making points, its dependence on balance and proportion. If they are not, it easily degenerates into pleading and propaganda, which tend to defeat their own ends, discrediting their cause by the methods which they use. I think that Black Lightning would have been both a better novel and a more effective message if this point had been remembered."

== See also ==
- 1964 in Australian literature
