= The Golden Girls (play) =

1950s Australian stage play

The Golden Girls is a 1950s stage play by Dymphna Cusack set in Sydney of the 1890s.

It was first turned into a radio play in 1954. The Age called it "well written".

The radio version was produced again later in 1954 and in 1955 and 1958.

The stage version premiered in England in 1955 at the Kidderminster Playhouse in Birmingham. The Birmingham Post called it "pure melodrama."

== Premise ==
"Angelica, Rosalind, Lavinia, and Charlotte Prendergast are known as the Golden Girls because of their hair color —golden blond for Angelica, titian-copper for Rosalind, and ash-blond for the twins, Lavinia and Charlotte. Another reason for the nickname is the wealth of their father, Major Prendergast. The goal of the Major’s life is that his daughters should marry the sons of English gentry who have migrated to Australia. However, the Major’s pride rebounds against himself over the lives of the four Golden Girls. "
