= Mary Reibey (radio play) =

1947 Australian radio drama

- Genre: Drama play
- Running time: 60 mins (8:00 pm – 9:00 pm)
- Country of origin: Australia
- Language: English
- Starring: Catherine Duncan
- Written by: Dymphna Cusack
- Original release: March 16, 1947

Mary Reibey was a 1947 Australian radio drama by Dymphna Cusack about the convict Mary Reibey. It aired as an episode of Lux Radio Theatre.

The play is not to be confused with the Rex Rienits radio play about Mary Reibey, Fulfilment.

== Premise ==
"In 1792, 15-year-old Mary Haydock was convicted and deported from England to Australia for having stolen a ride on a pony. Pardoned by Governor Arthur Phillip, she married a young officer, Thomas Reiby. Her remarkable business sense and forcetul personality brought her success in many buoiness ventures."

== Cast of 1948 production ==
- Catherine Duncan as Mary Reibey
- John Tate as Thomas Reibey
- Nancye Stewart as Carrie, the servant
- Reginald Collins as Simeon Lord

== Production ==
The play was bought by Lux after having been interred in a 1946 radio playwriting competition. (Others included "A Golden Legacy" about William Farrer and "Castle Hill".) It was presented to commemorate the eighth anniversary of Lux and producer Harry Dearth arranged for a special introduction from Hollywood by Ron Randell.

Cusack had written a chapter on Reibey for the 1938 book The Peaceful Army.

== Reception ==
The Herald said star Catherine Duncan gave "one of the best performances of her radio career, with a deft interpretation of the clever ex-convict."
