= Sydney Cove West Archaeological Precinct =

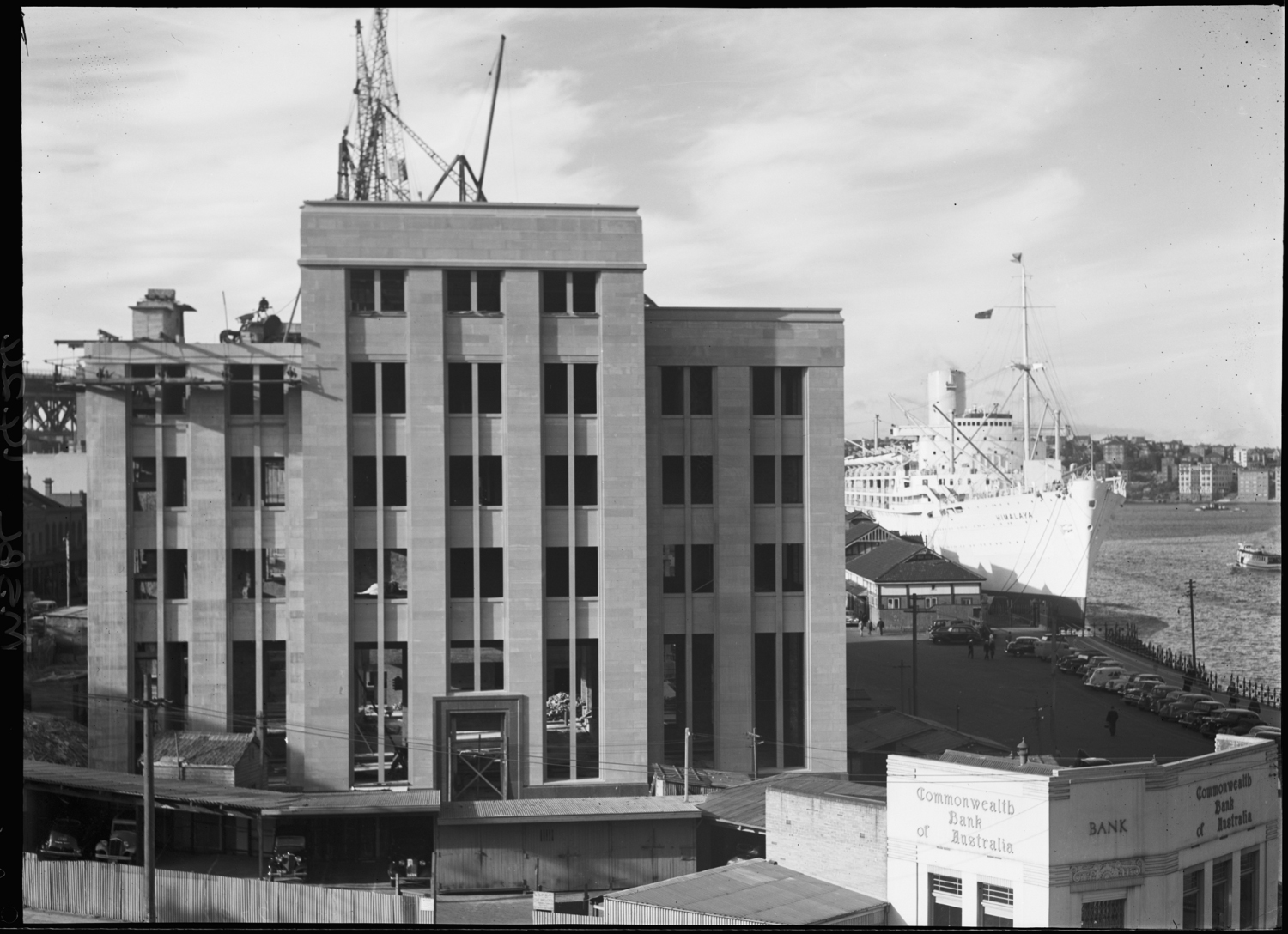
- A 1949 image of part of the precinct, with the MSB building (now MCA) under construction and former wharf facilities in place; since removed and redeveloped.

- Location within Sydney Location within Australia
- 33.8602°S 151.2091°E
- Location: 112–156 George Street, The Rocks, City of Sydney, New South Wales, Australia

History
- Built: 1797–1939

Site notes
- Owner: Property NSW

New South Wales Heritage Register
- Official name: Sydney Cove West Archaeological Precinct; Museum of Contemporary Art; Maritime Services Board; Colonial Government naval dockyard; Commissariat Stores; Colonial Hospital; Kings and Queens Wharf; First Fleet Park
- Type: State heritage (archaeological-terrestrial)
- Designated: 5 August 2011
- Reference no.: 1860
- Type: historic site

Sydney Cove West Archaeological Precinct is a heritage-listed precinct that contains The Rocks police station, the Museum of Contemporary Art Australia, car park, parks, shops and roads located at 112–156 George Street, in the inner city Sydney suburb of The Rocks in the City of Sydney local government area of New South Wales, Australia. The precinct previously contained a commissariat store, Maritime Services Board offices, dockyard and Department of Labour & Industry offices. Buildings in the precinct were developed in various stages since 1797 to date, with heritage-listed buildings dating from 1797 to 1939. The precinct is also known as the Museum of Contemporary Art, Maritime Services Board, Colonial Government naval dockyard, Commissariat Stores, Colonial Hospital, Kings and Queens Wharf and First Fleet Park. The property is owned by Property NSW, an agency of the Government of New South Wales. It was added to the New South Wales State Heritage Register on 5 August 2011.

== History ==
Sydney Cove is located in the country of the Cadigal people of the Eora nation. The absence of an archaeological record for the Cadigal (even allowing for large-scale city development) has led Karskens to believe that Sydney Cove was likely to be border country for the Eora nation and therefore possibly was not inhabited prior to European settlement.

=== From 1788 to 1799 ===
In 1788 the establishment of the penal settlement at Sydney Cove occurred in the precinct. Early maps and views of the site indicate that alluvial mud flats extended from the mouth of the Tank Stream (at the head of the Sydney Cove) along the western shoreline of the cove approximately far as the present day Museum of Contemporary Art Australia (MCA), formerly the 1952 Maritime Services Board building. It is likely that the First Fleet disembarked on the western side of Sydney Cove, along a foreshore of small sandy beaches and rocky outcrops that extended north from the present day MCA building. For its first forty years the primary function of the colony of New South Wales was a penal settlement. Initially the settlement was provisioned entirely by the Commissariat. The topography of Sydney Cove determined the command structure of the settlement following the arrival of the First Fleet on 26 January 1788. The civil authorities settled to the east of the Tank Stream and the military authorities to the west. The pattern of settlement also determined the control of access to ships, stores and the waterfront.

In 1792, Governor Arthur Phillip defined the boundaries of settlement: east of the Tank Stream were the residences of the Governor and civil authorities; west of the Tank Stream were the military barracks, parade ground and hospital. The convicts came to occupy the sandstone ridges (The Rocks) above Sydney Cove's western foreshores. Earliest plans of Sydney show no permanent occupation of the western side of Sydney Cove, other than the colony's first hospital (built 1788 along George Street) and the Hospital Wharf (constructed on the west side of Sydney Cove, close to the hospital). This was the first public wharf in the colony. The 1802 Hospital Wharf was timber framed with rubble infill and probably replaced an earlier wharf that was built by 1791. Governor Phillip's instructions prohibited the construction by private individuals of vessels capable of making contact with established ports within the region, or of trading within the area subject to the East India Company's monopoly. Earliest shipbuilding in the Colony was therefore initially a government activity. Phillip ordered that boats being built by private individuals were to be limited to fourteen feet (c. 4 metres (13 ft)) in length, to prevent escape attempts by convicts.

The Government Wharf was the first wharf built at Sydney Cove, in 1788–90 on the eastern side, close to the present day Customs House. The Government Wharf survived until around the 1840s when Sydney Cove was infilled to create Circular Quay). In 1791 convicts of the Third Fleet were disembarked at the Hospital Wharf. Small boats only unloaded at the Hospital Wharf. Cargoes were unloaded from ships in stream into smaller vessels. By 1793 privately owned passage boats ran between Sydney Cove and Parramatta. Before 1797, shipbuilding was carried out only on the eastern side of Sydney Cove, around the Government Wharf.

In 1797 Governor Hunter established the Government Dockyard on western side of Sydney Cove, north of the Hospital Wharf. Construction of the dockyard workshops, storehouse, boat sheds, sawyers' sheds, saw pits, watch house and a room for the clerk, all enclosed by a paling fence commenced the same year. 1797 returns show a dockyard workforce of 16 convicts. These were shipwrights, caulkers, boat builders, labourers and watchmen who repaired and refitted colonial and Royal Navy vessels and built small boats for the colony's settlements. The dockyard workforce increased to 27 convicts in 1799 and peaked briefly at 35 in 1800 before falling back to 27. In 1803 the convict workforce increased again to 42, rising to 49 in 1804 when the dockyard was especially busy. Isaac Nichols (an emancipated convict, later assistant to the Naval Officer, publican, trader and postmaster) built his first house, close to the Hospital Wharf.

=== From 1800 to 1809 ===
In 1800 Governor King ordered all liquor to be unloaded at Hospital Wharf and no goods to be landed before 6am or after 3pm. In 1800 the stone house for Master Builder completed in the north of the dockyard. Dockyard completed. By 1805, dockyard workforce of around 40. It included apprentices, but few trained shipwrights. From 1805, land granted and leased along the banks of the Tank Stream to its mouth on Sydney Cove. Grants near Hospital Wharf included Isaac Nichols (1791), Mary Reibey (1809), Thomas Jameson & Daniel McKay. Emancipists Isaac Nichols and Mary Reibey were among the first to build residences and commercial premises on the Tank Stream/western Sydney Cove land grants.

Land grants on the down slope allotments included the alluvial mudflats with a condition that the land be developed (making these the first sanctioned program of land reclamation in the colony). Due to reclamation and silting up of the Tank Stream, the extent of navigable water had receded by 250 metres (820 ft). In 1806 a report to Governor Bligh noted the dockyard was in need of repairs and additional buildings. Repairs and improvements were carried out by 1807. Isaac Nichols built a second, larger residence, facing George Street, between George Street and Hospital Wharf, that was used as Australia's first post office. Nichols also built a large, T-shaped three-storey warehouse building close to his new residence.

=== From 1810 to 1820 ===
The first Market place, where storeholders and traders sold goods, was located on the western side of Sydney Cove between High (George) Street North and the Hospital Wharf (in present-day First Fleet Park). It was marked on Surveyor Meehan's 1807 map as a triangular public space at the junction of George Street and Hospital Wharf. In 1811 Governor Macquarie relocated the Market place to further south along George Street at the site of the present day Queen Victoria Building, where it was served by a new wharf in Cockle Bay. Mary Reibey built a residence identical to Isaac Nichols' residence and adjacent to his house. This was occupied by Michael Hayes, Irish patriot transported in 1800 for taking part in 1798 rebellion. By 1812 Hayes was a successful small trader. In 1809 the design and construction of the Commissariat Stores by Lieutenant-Colonel Joseph Foveaux (the military administrator of the colony of NSW 1808–10, following the deposition of Governor Bligh).

In 1810 the completion of the first (4-storey, waterfront) Commissariat Stores building by Governor Macquarie, by convict labour, with associated sandstone quay, steps and seawall. The Commissariat Stores was one of the largest buildings constructed in the colony to date. Survey of the dockyard noted the need for more building repair, some buildings beyond repair, the completion of repairs to buildings and the addition of the new Blacksmiths Shop. In 1812, construction of a provision store, granary and office for the Commissariat Stores on [Lower] George Street to the west of the 1809 Commissariat Store building. Later the 1812 building became known as the Ordnance Stores. Both the 1809 and the 1812 Commissariat Stores buildings were constructed by convict labour.

The colony's farmers sold their produce to the Commissariat Stores. From 1812, produce of the Parramatta and Hawkesbury farms was transported by boat down the Parramatta and Hawkesbury Rivers, unloaded at the wharf and stored in the Commissariat. Surpluses were stored to regulate food supply and as a hedge against famine in drought years. The Commissariat Stories provided secure and vermin-proof storage of government provisions such as food (grain and vegetables grown in the colony), clothing, shoes, blankets, imported tools and equipment. These were distributed to the military and convicts "on stores" from 1788 to the end of the convict era in the 1840s. The Commissary Stores Receipts and Bills of Exchange were used as the colony's only currency until Governor Macquarie introduced regular circulating coinage in 1816.

In 1812–1813, Governor Macquarie ordered the removal and replacement of the old Hospital Wharf with a new upgraded wharf renamed the Kings Wharf. Stone steps were built to access the wharf from George Street. In 1837, on the accession of Queen Victoria, the wharf was renamed the Queens Wharf. In 1816 completion of the stone Coxswains Barracks (later known as Cadman's Cottage) to the north of the dockyard. This probably involved the demolition of an earlier building used by the boat crews and coxswains. While Cadman's Cottage was part of the Macquarie-era dockyard establishment, it is outside the curtilage of the Sydney Cove West Archaeological Precinct.

Following the end of over two decades of war with France, Britain greatly increased the number of convicts transported to the colony of NSW. The colony's convict population more than doubled during the second half of Governor Macquarie's administration. Governor Macquarie considerably enlarged and improved the dockyard. Macquarie's improvements included the construction of:

- four repairing docks (three of which were probably capable of dry-dock usage);
- new wharfs and quays;
- a sail room;
- workshops;
- boathouses;
- offices for the Master Builder and Master Attendant;
- a 4-metre (12 ft) high stone wall around dockyard.

=== From 1821 to 1855 ===
In 1821 Commissioner Bigge supported Macquarie's improvements to the dockyard and recommended they be completed as soon as possible. Francis Greenway noted that the Macquarie-era building works at the dockyards were carried out partly by convict and partly by contract labour. In the 1822 Macquarie's report to the Secretary of State for War and the Colonies, Earl Bathurst (on his return to England) details his works at the dockyard:

The Old Dockyard enlarged and greatly improved the new Building and repairing Docks, Wharfs, Quays, Sail Rooms, and all the requisite workshops, including Boat Houses, and also Offices for the Master Builder and Master Attendant of the Colonial Marine, the whole of the Premises being enclosed with a Stone Wall, 12 feet high. A Stone Built Barrack contiguous to the Dock Yard for the Coxswain and Crews of the Government Boats enclosed with a high Stone Wall.

This last item was the Coxswains Barracks - later known as Cadman's Cottage - part of the Macquarie-era dockyard establishment. The Government Coxswain supervised shipping from Sydney Cove; rostered boat crews who procured and shipped stores, timber, grass and shells for lime, and provided crews for the Governor's and naval officer's boats). The barracks probably served as office and quarters for some of the boat crews before it later came to be used as family accommodation for the coxswains.

During 1822-1823 the storehouse, later known as the Colonial Storekeepers Building, was built at the north end of dockyard, south of the Coxswains Barracks. In 1823 works by S. L. Harris at the George Street (1812) Commissariat Stores building. In 1824, Nichols' 1808 house became the Australian Hotel, later the Liverpool Hotel. Between 1825 and 1828 the dockyard workforce increased from around 70 to around 100 convict men and boys. In 1827 Peter Cunningham described the work undertaken at the dockyards:

At the colonial dock-yard all the Government vessels load, unload, and are repaired; government boats are kept; and the depot of coals for government use is situated. The naval portion of the work is performed by gangs of competent convicts from the barrack; the jail-gang being usually tasked with the lading and unlading of vessels.

Between 1830 and 1831 extensions to George Street Commissariat Store building. Necessitated removal of some buildings on south side and south-east corner of the dockyard. New boundary wall built on north side of the enlarged store. In 1831 dockyard activity being wound back and the establishment reduced to a minimum, around 14. Ship building and repairs put out to tender. Dockyard looks after small government boats only. Between 1831 and 1836 the demolition of buildings around the dockyard perimeter wall and construction of two office/residences. In 1833 the dockyard probably closed down.

Subsequently, a committee appointed to examine establishment of new wharfage at the head of Sydney Cove. A decision made to infill and reclaim the entire Sydney Cove foreshores. In November 1833, a brig, Ann Jamieson, ignited and exploded while unloading a cargo of gunpowder and bar iron at the Kings Wharf, burnt to water level and sank. Kings/Queens Wharf remained obstructed for eight years, until 1841. Establishment of the colonial Ordnance Department occurred in 1836; which moved into the George Street (1812) Commissariat Stores building. In 1838 work began (starting on the east side of Sydney Cove) on the construction of Circular Quay, initially under the direction of Captain George Barney, colonial engineer and later under the Colonial Architect.

From 1838 to 1847, completion of the first stage of the construction of Circular Quay. By 1844 Circular Quay had been completed on the east side of Sydney Cove as far as the mouth of the Tank Stream. The Tank Stream was then covered over and converted to a drain and sewer. The first stage involved convict labour in the reclamation of c.4 hectares (10 acres) of mudflats and the construction of a large, stone seawall. The second stage of Circular Quay construction (the reclamation and infilling of the western side of Sydney Cove), from 1847 to 1855, used free men as the workforce. By 1854 work had reached the dockyard. Queen's Wharf was removed (the stone stairs at the wharf were retained). The four docks were infilled and landlocked. On its completion in 1855, Circular Quay was one of the largest foreshore reclamation works of the 19th century. It raised the Sydney Cove foreshore by c.610 millimetres (2 ft) to overcome the extremes of tides. About the same time Nichols' large warehouse was either demolished or remodelled for redevelopment of the site and the construction of the Oriental Hotel, next to Queens Wharf.

In 1847 new walls constructed to north of the Commissariat store (within the old dockyard) and on part of the George Street frontage and the boundary wall rebuilt and there was further reduction in area of former dockyard. The Colonial Storekeepers Building (built 1823) was demolished. The following year the British Navy uses the Commissariat Stores for its stores. Following the end of the convict period, the Commissariat Stores is known as the Mercantile Free Stores and the Naval Stores. In 1849 there was a reduction in the importance of Ordnance Department. All establishments and lands for defence purposes are handed over to the Colony.

=== From 1856 to 1899 ===
By 1859 Circular Quay was extended to Cadman's Cottage. On the completion of Circular Quay, a stone seawall extended north of the dockyard to Campbell's Cove where a timber wharf was built around that end of Sydney Cove. The foreshore in front of Cadman's Cottage remained tidal until c. 1870. The land in front of Cadman's cottage was filled and raised 1870–75. Following the reclamation and infill of Circular Quay, development increased along the foreshore. From the 1850s n increasing numbers of ships visit Circular Quay. Silting in Circular Quay from the 1850s increased mud levels. Ships were often moored up to 23 metres from shore. Heavy ramps and gangplanks connected the ships to shore, but these caused the vessels to list. In 1856 the Commissariat and Ordnance stores transferred to the Colonial Government under the Constitution Act. Condition of transfer is that space be available to British Government in the Commissariat Stores for naval or military stores. the north wing of the building is used by the Colonial Storekeeper. In 1859 there were extensive repairs to Commissariat Stores and removal of wall between stores and former dockyard area. The repairs to Ordnance Stores were completed in 1861.

From the late 1850s to c. 1863-1864 Argyle Street was extended eastwards to the new Circular Quay foreshore and over the infilled northernmost and largest of the Macquarie-era docks. The Colonial Storekeepers Building, now separated from the dockyard by the Argyle Street extension, was demolished. The post of Government Coxswain had been abolished in 1846. Cadman's Cottage was now also separated from the landlocked dockyard and was handed over to the Water Police. New stores were built at south-east corner of (Lower) George Street and Argyle Street and the boundary wall rebuilt. During the 1860s and 1870s additional stores were built at the north end of site and some other buildings constructed around Commissariat Stores and in yards.

Between the 1860s and 1890s the Ordnance Store continued in use for ordnance, military and Commissariat offices and stores. The Commissariat Store continued in use for Royal Navy stores. Nichols' 1808 house used as shopfront for a bricklayer, then a boarding house, then by Chinese merchants Yee Sang Loong. By the 1850s it was converted to the Australian Hotel. Reibey's house was later a ships chandlers, then a merchants, premises. From the late 1870s ferry services established from the Circular Quay, the first ferry jetty being built opposite the Customs House. During the 1870s and 1880s shipping companies leased permanent berths at Circular Quay. There was an increase in shipping trade and need for rail access saw shipping begin to move away from Circular Quay to Darling Harbour. Other commercial shipping was relocated from the head of Circular Quay to west and east sides. Served by warehouses on quay. Passenger shipping lines (e.g. Peninsular and Oriental Steam Navigation Company (P&O)) remained at Circular Quay.

From 1882, additional space was required for naval stores. The north wing of the Commissariat Stores surrendered for use by Navy. During 1889 and 1892, demolition (for extensive road widening) of Isaac Nichols' and Mary Reibey's houses along with other buildings on the east side of George Street in the vicinity of Queens Wharf (present day First Fleet Park). The site of the present-day First Fleet Park was cleared of buildings. Metropolitan Fire Brigade No 3 Fire Station was built on part of the First Fleet Park site. In 1890 the triangular land portion at the junction of George Street and Queens Wharf resumed for wharfage and other public purposes. In the 1890s, Circular Quay was dominated by passenger vessels and mail steamers. Around 5 million passengers a year arrived at Circular Quay. It was identified that an upgrade was needed to major wharf facilities. Commercial vessels were removed to Darling Harbour. In c. 1896 naval stores were transferred to Garden Island. The Commissariat Stores vacated.

=== From 1900 to 1960s ===
In 1900 the NSW Government resumed land in The Rocks and Millers Point as a result of the bubonic plague in the area. The Government gained control over a major residential, commercial and maritime precinct. In 1901, management of the former Commissariat Stores was transferred to NSW Government under the Sydney Harbour Trust (which later became the Maritime Services Board). The Sydney Harbour Trust was established to administer the land vested in it by government resumption. Queens Wharf was remodelled, widened and renamed Barton Street. Wharf activities relocated to Darling Harbour. Tram lines laid at Barton Street. Between 1901 and the 1930s the Commissariat Stores were leased out to business tenants. Ordnance Stores used to house government offices, including the NSW Taxation Department, Department of Agriculture, and laboratories. In 1904 the Sydney Harbour Trust Headquarters were built at corner of Pitt and Barton Streets, on the site of the Oriental Hotel.

In 1908 a Royal Commission for the Improvement of the City of Sydney and its Suburbs was appointed. In 1913 the Town Planning Association of NSW established. John Sulman, an architect, championed the need for planned transport routes, public and open spaces and protection of harbour foreshores. Contemporary urban design schemes were curtailed by the outbreak of World War I. In 1914 an addition to the north end of Ordnance Store (1812 Commissariat building), probably for the Department of Agriculture's Chemical Laboratory. The Department of Labour and Industry also occupied the Ordnance Store. In 1923 a foundation stone was laid for new offices of the Department of Labour & Industry at the corner of George and Argyle Streets (132 George Street, now the Police Station).

In 1936 the site for a new head office for the Maritime Services Board was chosen on the west side of Circular Quay in close proximity to the Department of Labour and Industry. The City Council introduced town planning legislation and a City Planning and Improvement Committee, with a precinct sub-committees. The same year the Maritime Services Board (MSB) took over the functions of Sydney Harbour Trust. The following year the Circular Quay Planning Committee (Butters Committee) suggests using the Commissariat and Ordnance Stores site for new MSB head offices. These to be sited in a parkland setting. The MSB building was part of the NSW Government's vision for the redevelopment of Circular Quay which included the construction of a new elevated city railway. The existing MSB offices were to be demolished for the railway. The Circular Quay Advisory Committee approved this recommendation and gave the tenants of the affected buildings three months notice. In 1939 the Commissariat and Ordnance Stores were demolished. This was one of earliest examples of public debate generated by the demolition of a historic building. Hyde Park Barracks was also under threat of demolition. It was instrumental in the formation of the heritage movement in Australia and the establishment of the National Trust of Australia in 1949.

Between 1946 and 1952 construction of the MSB head offices on the site of the demolished Commissariat and Ordnance Stores was completed. In the 1950s and 1960s there was extensive foreshore redevelopment with further (and final) shoreline reclamation to the current alignment. The Metropolitan Fire Station and Sydney Harbour Trust building demolished between 1953 and 1956. Their sites and Barton Street were subsumed into a landscaped open park space (Maritime Reserve) south of the MSB building. In 1959 the new Overseas Passenger Terminal opened (north of the former dockyards area and outside the curtilage). In the early 1960s construction of the esplanade at Circular Quay West was completed.

=== From the 1960s to the present ===
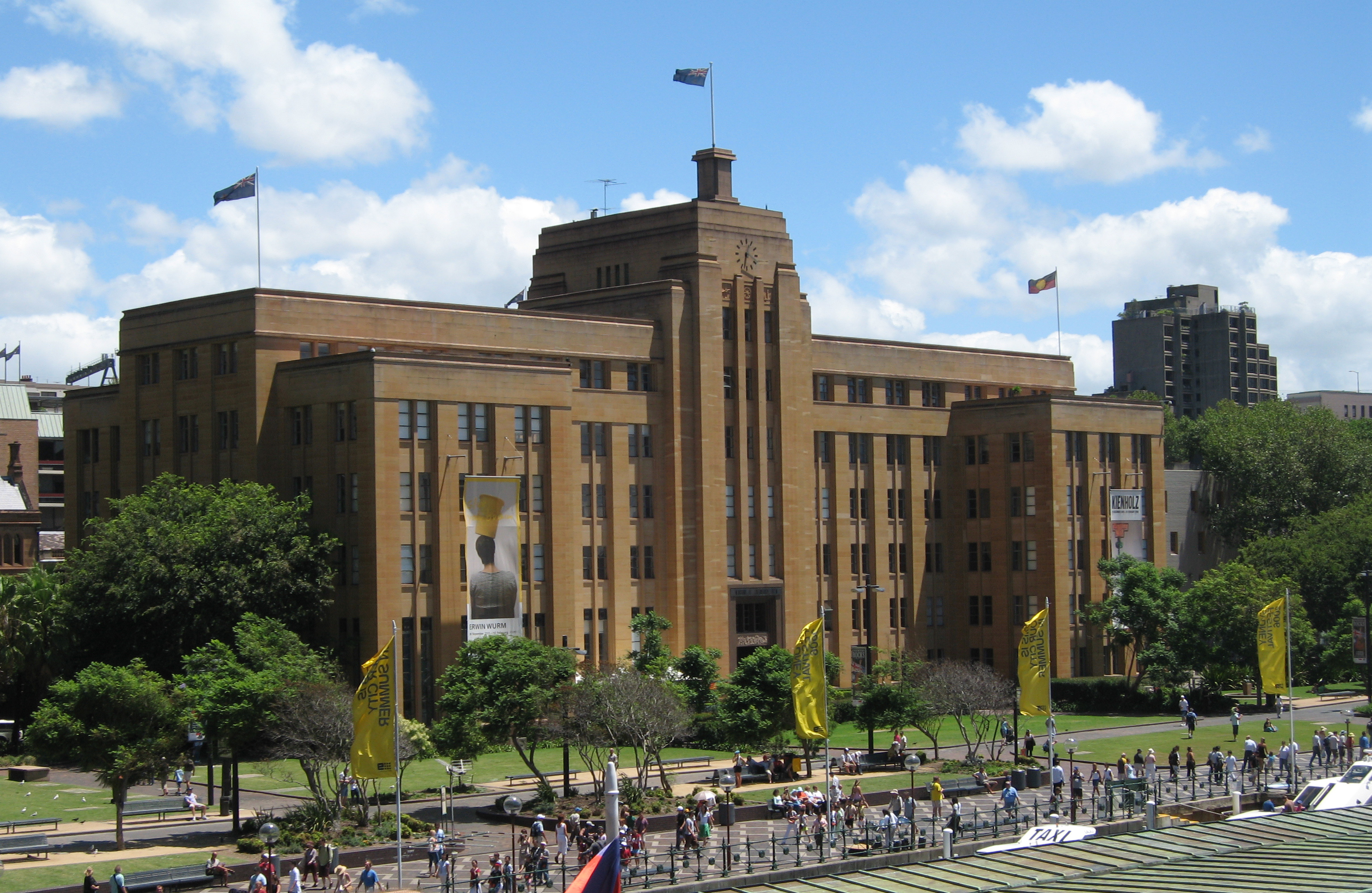
A contemporary image of the precinct with the MCA building centre, First Fleet Park at left and partially obscured, and promenade.

The NSW Government completed a comprehensive landscaping plan for a maritime reserve in 1985. The plan involved the closure and paving of Circular Quay West roadway between Alfred and Argyle Streets to form a foreshore promenade. The park space was extended and greened with plantings. In 1986 a redesign and renaming of the park space as First Fleet Park occurred in advance of the bicentennial celebrations of 1988. In 1990 adaptive reuse of the former MSB building as the Museum of Contemporary Art (MCA). Conversion by Peddle Thorp and Walker included the extension to provide shop fronts to George Street and in November 1991 the MCA opens. In 1997 an international design competition held for the proposed MCA extension on the car park site adjacent to the MCA (former MSB building). The winning entry had several basement levels and did not proceed after site testing identified the archaeological remains of the Macquarie-era docks. In 2000 a new design proposal for a building to straddle the northern and middle docks and expose and leave visible some of the archaeological resource did not proceed, partly due to public opposition to the proposed changes. In 2010 works began on MCA extension in the car park area.

== Description ==
The former Maritime Services Board Building (now the Museum of Contemporary Art) was built on the site of the demolished Commissariat Stores buildings, and on part of the old (infilled) government naval dockyard. The site of the former government dockyard continues to the north of the MCA building under the present car park that is the site of the current extension building to the MCA and also the Police Station at 132 George Street.

The former dockyard site extends across the eastern extremity of Argyle Street and includes Bligh and Barney Park and land owned by the Sydney Harbour Foreshore Authority immediately in front of Cadman's Cottage's SHR curtilage.. The site includes First Fleet Park to the south of the former MSB (current MCA) building. First Fleet Park is the site of archaeology associated with the hospital, Queens and Kings Wharfs (c. 1791 - 1813); the Market Place (c. 1807–11); Isaac Nichols' houses and warehouse and the colony's first post office (c. 1798–1808); Mary Reibey's house (1811), and the mouth of the Tank Stream (infilled 1840s).

The Sydney Cove West Archaeological Precinct comprises two main elements:

- Government dockyards (1797–1859) and associated buildings and structures
- Early 18th residential and commercial precinct.

These two site elements include the identified, predictive and potential significant archaeology of:

1. Government dockyards (1797–1859)
2. Commissariat Stores buildings (1810 and 1812–1939)
3. Hospital/Kings/Queens Wharf (c. 1791–1908)
4. Isaac Nichols and Mary Reibey's houses, warehouse and post office (c. 1798–1890s).

=== Government dockyards, 1797–1859 ===
Bounded by George Street on the west and the pre-1859 Sydney Cove shoreline (now under the Circular Quay West promenade) on the east. The southern boundary was the Hospital/Kings/Queens Wharf (located in present-day First Fleet Park, immediately south of the 1952 former Maritime Services Board (MSB) building, now the MCA). The Macquarie-era dockyards extended north to include Cadman's Cottage (the former Coxswain's Barracks). Cadman's Cottage is not included in the curtilage for the Sydney Cove West Archaeological Precinct.

During 1797-98 dockyards comprised workshops, storehouse, boat sheds, sawyers sheds, saw pits, watch house and a room for the clerk, were all enclosed by a paling fence. In 1800 a stone house for master builder added which completed the Hunter-era dockyards. An 1804 view of the dockyard shows a long open-fronted building (probably a boat shed) along the George Street frontage. During 1809-10 a new blacksmith's shop was built. By 1816 the Coxswain's Barracks (Cadman's Cottage) at the northern end of the dockyard had been completed. (An earlier building used by the boat crews and coxswains was probably demolished at this time). The construction of Circular Quay landlocked the dockyards by 1859 with the reclamation of the foreshore following the infilling of the docks in 1847. The foreshore in front of Cadmans Cottage was still tidal until the 1870s when a new timber wharf was built. Between 1870 and 1875 the land in front of Cadmans Cottage was filled and raised.

Between 1818 and 1822 Governor Macquarie's improvements considerably enlarged the dockyard. Four repairing docks were constructed (three of which were probably capable of dry-dock usage). Also built were new wharfs and quays, a sail room, workshops, boathouses and offices for the Master Builder and Master Attendant. A high stone wall was constructed around the dockyard. The four Macquarie-era docks extended from the north-eastern corner of the 1952 former MSB/MCA building northwards to Bligh and Barney Park. The southernmost dock has been partially identified and is partly located under the north-eastern corner of the MSB/MCA building and partly in the MCA car park. The middle and northern docks have been identified and are located under the present MCA car park which is the site of the approved MCA extensions currently in progress (2010). The northern dock is known to have stepped sides. The largest and northernmost dock is believed to be located partly under the eastern end of Argyle Street and partly in the adjacent Bligh and Barney Park.

During 1822 and 1823 the storehouse (later the Colonial Storekeepers Building) was built at northern end of dockyard, immediately south of Cadman's Cottage (within Bligh and Barney Park). In c. 1831-36 the buildings around the dockyard perimeter walls were demolished and two office/residences were constructed. A new boundary wall was built north of the enlarged George Street Commissariat store. Further reduction in area of the former dockyard occurred during 1847. Four Macquarie-era docks were infilled in the construction of Circular Quay during 1854–55; and land was reclaimed and the seawall built. New walls to north of George Street Commissariat Store (within the old dockyard) and on part of the George Street frontage were completed. During 1859 to 1863 Argyle Street was extended to the Circular Quay foreshore across the largest (infilled) northernmost Macquarie-era dock. Colonial Storekeepers Building was now separated from the dockyard by the street extension and demolished. New stores were built at the south-east corner of [Lower] George Street and Argyle Street. Later they were demolished for the 1923-5 building at 132 George Street. Removal of the wall between the stores and the former dockyard occurred during this period. During the 1860s and 1870s additional stores were built at the north end of the site and some other buildings constructed around the Commissariat Stores and in the dockyard. The construction of semi-Circular Quay landlocked the dockyards by 1859, but the original foreshore remained in front of Cadman's Cottage. Between 1870 and 1875 the land in front of Cadman's Cottage was infilled and raised. In 1914 the Department of Labour & Industry moved onto the dockyard site; and in 1923 a foundation stone was laid for new offices for the Department of Labour & Industry at the corner of George and Argyle Streets. The building later became the George Street Police Station.

=== Commissariat Stores buildings, 1810 and 1812 to 1939 ===
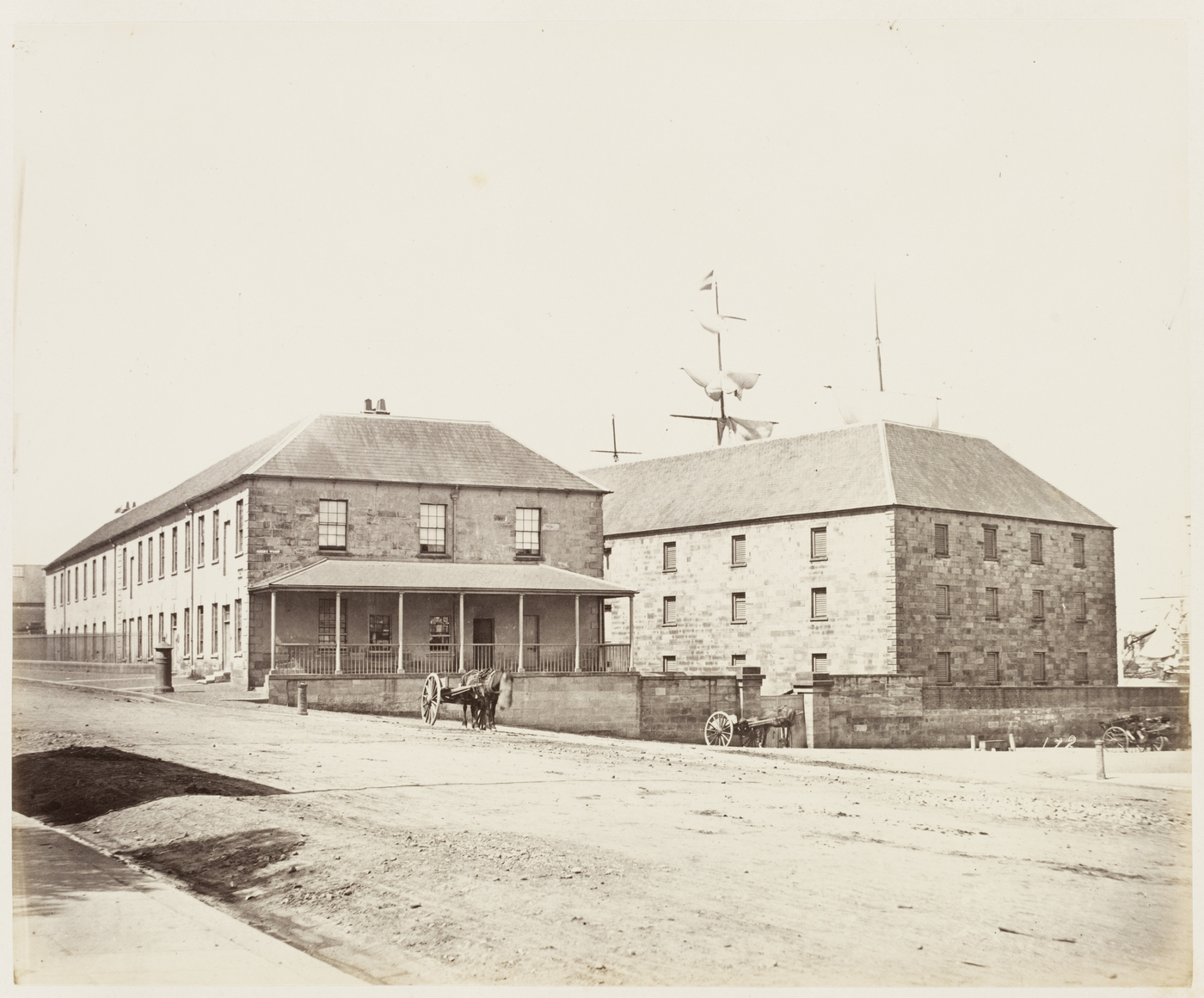
The Commissariat Stores, in 1872

The 1810 waterfront building was a four-storey stone building, built from cut blocks of sandstone immediately adjacent to the original shoreline by convict labour. It was designed by Joseph Foveaux and built in 1809 following the previous year's Rum Rebellion. The shallow, U-shaped building had two short wings projecting to the east (the waterfront) from the main building. The wings enclosed a stone paved quay where ships anchored. The two wings had large openings on their eastern facades (that faced the waterfront) each with a cats eye fixed beneath the roof line for loading goods into the warehouse. The hipped roof, was initially shingle or clay-tiled but later re-clad with corrugated iron. The warehouse was timber floored.

The 1812 George Street building was constructed as the provision store, granary and office for the Commissariat under Governor Lachlan Macquarie's authority, also using convict labour. Between 1830 and 1831 the building was extended and a new boundary wall was built on the north side of the enlarged store. In 1836 the Ordnance Department was established in the colony and assigned the George Street Commissariat Store building which becomes known as the Ordnance Stores. Convict masons who constructed the Commissariat Stores carved their initials into each of the sandstone blocks used in the buildings. Both Commissariat Stores buildings were demolished in 1939 to make way for the new Maritime Services Board building (constructed 1946–52), now part of the Museum of Contemporary Art Australia.

An intense public effort to preserve the two buildings failed, but later helped inspire the formation of the National Trust of Australia. Some of the remaining blocks from the two buildings were reused in other buildings throughout The Rocks.

=== Hospital/Kings/Queens Wharf, c. 1791–1908 ===
The colony's first public wharf (a timber frame with rubble infill structure) was constructed by 1802, probably replacing an earlier wharf dating from at least 1792. It was located on the west side of Sydney Cove, close to the first hospital that was built in George Street in 1788. Storeholders and traders sold goods in the George Street marketplace, close to Hospital Wharf (within present day First Fleet Park). The market place was marked and named on Surveyor Meehan's 1807 map as a triangular public space at the junction of George Street and Hospital Wharf. The market place was relocated by Governor Macquarie in 1810–11 to further south down George Street (the site of the present day Queen Victoria Building) where it was now served by a new wharf in Cockle Bay. During 1812 and 1813 Governor Macquarie ordered the removal of the old Hospital Wharf and its replacement with a new upgraded wharf called the Kings Wharf. Stone steps were built to access the wharf from George Street. In 1833 the brig Ann Jamieson ignited and exploded while unloading a cargo of gunpowder and bar iron at the Kings Wharf, burnt to the water level and sank. The wharf remained obstructed until 1841. In 1837 the Kings Wharf was renamed the Queens Wharf on the accession of Queen Victoria; and in 1854 the Queens Wharf replaced by new public wharfage with the reclamation of land for Circular Quay. Between 1890 and 1908 the NSW Government resumesthe triangular land portion at the junction of George Street and Queens Wharf and, later, the land surrounding the site of the wharf. The former wharf area was remodelled and renamed Barton Street. Tram lines were laid along Barton Street and construction of the Sydney Harbour Trust headquarters at Pitt and Barton Street (on the site of the Oriental Hotel) was completed.

=== Isaac Nichols' and Mary Reibey's houses, warehouse and post office, c. 1798–1890s ===
Between 1798 and 1800 Isaac Nichols constructed his first house, likely the first in the Colony, a whitewashed, gabled roofed cottage with skillion addition built near to Hospital Wharf. In 1808 Nichols constructed a second, large, two-storey house, built facing George Street North. The house was located between the Hospital Wharf and Mary Reibey's (identical) house, built 1811. In 1809 the Commissariat Store building was located close to Nichols house, immediately north of the Hospital Wharf. By the 1850s Nichols' house was converted to the Australian Hotel. Mary Reibey's house was later a ships chandlers then a merchants premises. Between 1843 and 1855 Nichol's large warehouse was either demolished or remodelled and the site redeveloped for the Oriental Hotel. In 1889 both Nichols' and Reibey's houses (with other commercial and residential buildings) were demolished for road widening.

=== Condition ===
In 1991, archaeological monitoring was carried out as part of work for the refurbishment of the Museum of Contemporary Art (MCA) and further investigations were carried out in 1997. These have provided substantial evidence for the survival of rare intact remains and deposits in the area. This was confirmed in 2009 when Godden Mackay Logan carried out a Ground Penetrating Radar survey on the First Fleet Park and MCA Forecourt area which showed large areas of below ground archaeological remains.

==== Summary of archaeological testing, 1997–2008 ====
===== Archaeological assessment of the MCA car park located beneath the northern wall of the present MCA building and the eastern terminus of Argyle Street =====
Substantial remains of the Macquarie-period dockyard (1810–22) survive within and to the north of the MCA car park site. It is possible that further remains may survive under, to the east and to the south of the 1952 former Maritime Services Board (MSB) building (the present MCA). Archaeological testing has located remains of three of the four docks built by Governor Macquarie 1818–22 in the Government dockyard. These are the northern, middle and southern docks. A fourth dockyard (the largest of the four) is predicted to the north of the site, located partly under Argyle Street and extending north into Bligh and Barney Park. Testing indicates that substantial portions of the two centre docks (the northern and middle docks) are extant. The line of the western ends of both these two docks and the alignment of most of the walls of the middle dock have been located. Both docks lie beneath the car park that is the site of the MCA extensions. Remains of a portion of the southern dock wall have been identified. This dock lies partly under the north-east corner of the former MSB/MCA building. It is considered that there is limited potential for the survival of the archaeology of other dockyard-period structures as shown on the historic plans. Testing has revealed various work surfaces around the docks which represent levels where the loading, unloading and repair of the ships took place. These work surfaces are likely to retain evidence of machinery bases for davits.

Northern Dock

This dock is known to have had stepped sides. 1997 testing of the southern wall located a row of rough sandstone blocks with stone rubble core and no wall facing. This indicates that the stepped ashlar coursing of this part of the northern dock has been removed. Testing of the western end of the northern dock revealed mortar beds which suggests that the upper ashlar courses have been removed. Testing in 1997 did not locate the northern dock wall. Testing was carried out in 1998 along the northern site boundary to determine the alignment of the northern wall of the northern dock. This revealed that intact stone coursing of the western end wall and north-west corner of the dock remained at lower levels. Above these courses the stonework had been removed leaving the mortar beds on which the stone had rested. Testing along the northern wall indicated that the lower steps were cut into bedrock. 1998 testing also revealed a vertical stone wall that was built on the northern dock wall. This was interpreted as a retaining wall built in the 1850s when Argyle Street was extended eastwards over the infilled dockyard to the newly created Circular Quay waterfront.

Middle Dock

Testing in 1997 located the top of the dressed southern face of the northern wall and the vertical wall face of large ashlar masonry to 2.5 metres (8 ft 2 in) depth. Testing did not extend to the base of the wall so the dock floor was not revealed. An iron rail was also located, running parallel to the wall (east–west) and likely also to be connected with the dock's function. An iron mooring ring projecting from the northern wall was located. Exposed shell mortar on the upper surface indicated that at least one upper course had been removed. The wall was followed westwards to where it met rising bedrock, indicating that the western end of the middle dock was cut into bedrock with no stonework. The stonework of the southern wall was also located in the 1997 testing. Testing in 2000 revealed stonework of an east–west wall that was built on the northern wall of the middle dock in 1847 (when the dock was infilled and new walls were constructed in the old dockyard). In 2008 test holes determined the alignments of the walls of the middle dock, except for the south-west corner which was obscured by a modern service. Test holes revealed a mortar surface connected with the missing upper coursing of the western end of the middle dock and evidence of a coursing step. North of the middle dock, the level stepped up to what has been interpreted as a sandstone retaining wall running north–south between the middle and northern docks. A compacted cinder surface close to the wall is probably part of a dockyard period work surface. Testing south of the middle dock revealed a truncated wall running east–west with a flat, compacted sandy surface on its northern side which was probably another dockyard working surface.

Southern Dock

In 2000 testing close to the north-east corner of the former MSB/MCA building revealed shell-mortar covered sandstone slabs that are likely to be part of the southern wall of the southern dock. Their lack of shape indicates they were part of the wall core rather than stone facing or coursing which may have been removed.

Dockyard area outside the three docks

Testing in 2000 in the western part of the MCA car park, close to 132 George Street, located a remnant surface at the rear of the middle dock and sandstone footings that probably belonged to a dockyard building shown on a c. 1858 plan (thus a post dockyard feature). The footings butt up to the stonework of the 1847 wall running east–west that was built on the northern wall of the middle dock when the docks were infilled.

===== Archaeology of the Commissariat Stores =====
Archaeological monitoring has recorded structural remains of the Commissariat Stores that was demolished to ground level in 1939. Portions of sandstone flagging of the waterfront quay between the two wings of the 1809 Commissariat Stores building were recorded under the former MSB/MCA building and extending to the grassed area to the east of this building.

===== Archaeology of the Argyle Street terminus and Bligh and Barney Park =====
Limited testing under this section of Argyle Street has revealed some dressed sandstone slabs that probably belong to the dry dock (the largest of the four docks). The testing was too limited to make an assessment of the integrity of this dock. Other remains, including wall footings and large sandstone slab drains, were located in limited testing under Argyle Street and under the adjoining Bligh and Barney Park.

===== Archaeology of 1840s and 1850s seawall of Circular Quay =====
SHFA confirm the identified archaeology of the seawall constructed in the 1840s and 1850s for Circular Quay on the western side of Sydney Cove. Massive stone blocks were encountered at one location during development works to the MCA in 2010.

===== Cadman's Cottage =====
Archaeological investigations have identified evidence of the 1788 shoreline on the eastern side of the cottage (within the SHR curtilage for the Sydney Cove West Archaeological Precinct).

===== Potential archaeology =====
The potential has been identified for remains of the earliest dockyard buildings (dating from Governor Hunter's dockyard established in 1797) and other structures beneath the archaeology of the two Commissariat Stores buildings (1809–12). It is considered unlikely that remains have survived of the earlier dockyards that predate Governor Macquarie's enlargements as the four Macquarie-era docks were built into bedrock. There may be some limited potential for archaeology to the west of the docks but this will be remnant structural evidence such as parts of footings. Most of the known dockyard buildings were to the north of the AMP study area (i.e. north of the MCA carpark) or were underneath 132 George Street (within the study area). 132 George Street is cut down below current ground levels so the archaeological potential is low. Few structures are shown on historical plans dated earlier than 1847.

===== Archaeological testing 1991, 1993 & 2000 and Ground Penetrating Radar Survey, June 2009 =====
====== Archaeology of First Fleet Park ======
First Fleet Park has been assessed as having high archaeological potential based on archaeological monitoring and testing activities by Casey & Lowe in the 1990s that provided a predictive model for the presence of subsurface remains. This informed the analysis of the remote sensing survey by ground penetrating radar (GPR) undertaken in June 2009 for the First Fleet Park CMS. This information strongly invalidates the site assessment in The Rocks and Millers Point Archaeological Management Plan (1991) which stated that the Museum of Contemporary Art (MCA) area was likely to be completely disturbed. The construction of the former Maritime Services Board building (the present MCA) in 1946-52 was accompanied by the raising of the ground level of the landscaped and park areas by 40 to 59 centimetres (16 to 23 in). This would suggest the retention of archaeological deposits, particularly in the present MCA forecourt area. The major upgrade and landscaping program to First Fleet Park for the 1988 bicentenary involved the further raising of its ground level by around one metre.

1991 and 1993 archaeological monitoring programs for stormwater services and street works interpreted the following sub-surface features in First Fleet Park as:

1. A dry-coursed sandstone seawall which may date to the 1840s reclamation and infill program that created Circular Quay.
2. Timber piles belonging to the mid-nineteenth-century Queen's Wharf.
3. Wall foundations of buildings south-west of the Hospital/Kings/Queens Wharf along George Street that likely included the foundations of Isaac Nichols' 1808 house that was used as the colony's first post office.
4. Some wall remnants of the demolition layer of early nineteenth-century buildings (demolished 1880s) located at the junction of Queens Wharf and George Street.
5. In the area of the present MCA forecourt, large rough-cut sandstone blocks laid without mortar at around 1.75 metres (5 ft 9 in) below ground, below which was bedrock at 2.7 metres (8 ft 10 in). These were interpreted as a section of the quay floor associated with the 1809 Commissariat Stores building. Remains of brick structures and associated deposits were also identified that were demolished prior to the construction of the 1809 Commissariat Stores.

The First Fleet Park CMS (2009) assesses the potential archaeological resource of First Fleet Park as:

1. Evidence of the original landform;
2. Aboriginal cultural material;
3. Earliest post-contact occupation deposits including pre-Commissariat Stores structures; evidence of Isaac Nichols' houses and warehouse (1798–1800, 1808) and Mary Reibey's house (1811); original foreshore warehouses; other uses of the foreshores prior to wharf structures;
4. Wharves and maritime activity from 1797;
5. Reclamation and infilling for Circular Quay from the 1840s and associated seawalls; and
6. Later nineteenth-century and early twentieth-century occupation relating to demolished buildings and landscape items prior to demolition of the area from 1939.

The Ground Penetrating Radar (GPR) survey, undertaken in 2009 to ascertain the likely archaeological resource and service constraints in First Fleet Park, surveyed a total area of 7,700 square metres (83,000 sq ft). The GPR survey results were limited by the thick layer of clay infill used in the 1980s park redevelopment. This limited the penetration of the radar signal to around 150 centimetres (59 in) depth only. Detection of archaeological remains at First Fleet Park was therefore unlikely as most were located below this depth. The GPR survey did succeed in identifying significant subsurface features. But many of the strongest signals (such as large anomalies at shallow depths of 50–100 centimetres (20–39 in)) were service-related rather than subsurface features. Anomalies at depths of 150–250 centimetres (59–98 in) have been interpreted as possibly archaeological in nature. These include:

1. In the south-west corner of First Fleet Park, a strong linear feature running on a diagonal to the current George Street alignment disappears between 200 and 250 centimetres (79 and 98 in). This may be building foundations from the original George Street frontage of early nineteenth-century residential, commercial and retail premises. It aligns with Casey & Lowe's interpretation, from its 1993 archaeological monitoring program, of nineteenth-century building foundations, potentially those of Isaac Nichols' houses and warehouse (1798–1800 and 1808).
2. A linear feature running west to east that may be associated with the Kings/Queens Wharf (dating from 1816).
3. A linear feature running north–south that may be a seawall associated with the 1840s land reclamation and infill for Circular Quay. This was revealed in archaeological monitoring as having been previously disturbed by the laying of telephone cables and other services.
4. A strongly rectangular anomaly at 200 centimetres (79 in) depth may indicate the foundations or basements of buildings that abutted the north of Isaac Nichols' house, near the Hospital/Kings/Queens Wharf.
5. The foundations of the Commissariat Stores 1809 building are clearly visible in the Forecourt of the present MCA (former MSB) building.
6. An extremely strong, consistent signal at depth (strongest at 200 to 250 centimetres (79 to 98 in)) running north/northwest across the car park, north of the present MCA (former MSB) building. This corresponds with the remains of the dockyard.
7. Other strong signals are likely to relate to the docks, wharfage construction (stone quay) or later building foundations.

Archaeological testing has revealed that substantial remains of the Macquarie-period dockyard (1810–22) survive within, and to the north of, the MCA car park site. It is possible that further remains may survive under, to the east, and to the south of the present MCA (former MSB) building. Remains of three of the four stone docks built by Governor Macquarie 1818–22 in the Government dockyard have been located. These are the northern, middle and southern docks. A fourth dockyard (the largest of the four) is predicted to the north of the site, located partly under Argyle Street and extending north into Bligh and Barney Park. Testing indicates that substantial portions of the two centre docks (the northern and middle docks) are extant. The line of the western ends of both these two docks and the alignment of most of the walls of the middle dock have been located. The exposed sections of the middle dock are highly intact. The integrity of the middle dock is higher than the northern dock. Both docks lie beneath the car park that is the site of the MCA extensions. Remains of a portion of the southern dock wall have been identified. This dock lies partly under the north-east corner of the 1952 MCA (former MSB) building. Testing has revealed various work surfaces around the docks which represent levels where the loading, unloading and repair of the ships took place. These work surfaces are likely to retain evidence of machinery bases for davits. It is considered that there is limited potential for the survival of the archaeology of other dockyard-period structures as shown on the historic plans. A section of the 1840s–1850s seawall of Circular Quay has been identified in 2010 development works at the MCA where massive stone blocks were encountered in one location. Overall the site is partly disturbed. Archaeological investigation indicates that there is disturbance to the depth of bedrock on the western boundary between the current MCA (former MSB) building and George Street. However, potential archaeological remains that have been detected in ground penetrating survey (2009) in the landscaped areas between the MCA building and Circular Quay and in First Fleet Park are expected to be better preserved since the ground level here was raised in the mid- and later 20th century.

=== Modifications and dates ===
- 1789–92: Hospital Wharf built on the west side of Sydney Cove.
- 1797: Governor Hunter establishes the Government naval dockyards on the west side of Sydney Cove.
- 1798–1800: Isaac Nichol's builds the first house on the west side of Sydney Cove, next to the Hospital Wharf.
- 1805: First land grants along the Tank Stream banks to its mouth on Sydney Cove.
- 1808 Isaac Nichols' builds his larger residence that becomes Australia's first Post Office and a large warehouse next to Hospital Wharf and the Commissariat Stores.
- 1809 and 1812: Commissariat Buildings constructed.
- 1810–1811: Market Place (near George Street and Hospital Wharf) relocated to site of present-day Queen Victoria building.
- 1811: Mary Reibey builds her house next to Isaac Nichols' house.
- 1812–1813: Hospital Wharf replaced with King's Wharf.
- 1818–1822: Governor Macquarie builds four new docks and generally enlarges and extends the dockyards.
- 1830–1831: Extensions to the George Street (1812) Commissariat Store building with removal of adjacent buildings and a new boundary wall on the north side of the extended store building.
- 1831–1836: Dockyards wind down and perimeter buildings are demolished. Dockyards close c.1833.
- 1847: Dockyards are infilled and landlocked; new boundary walls and walls north of the Commissariat Stores built; new stores built on corner of Lower George and Argyle Streets.
- 1850s–c.1864: Argyle Street extended to Circular Quay over the infilled largest dock. Colonial Storekeepers Building is then separated from the dockyard by the street extension and is demolished.
- 1860s–1870s: Additional stores built at north end of site and other buildings constructed around the Commissariat Stores and in the yards.
- 1923: New office for Department of Labour and Industry built at corner of George and Argyle Streets (later the George Street Police Station).
- 1938: Designs begun for the new Maritime Services Board (MSB) Building.
- 1939: Commissariat Buildings demolished for new MSB building.
- 1946–1952: Construction of MSB Building.
- 1952: 15 December. MSB occupies building and begins operations.
- 1980s: MSB move to new offices.
- 1988: Landscaping to forecourt of MSB building; reinstatement of railing to Circular Quay.
- 1990: Adaptive reuse of the former MSB building as the Museum of Contemporary Art (MCA). Conversion by Peddle Thorp and Walker, including extension to provide shop fronts to George Street.
- 1991: Opening of the MCA.
- 1988: Upgrade of landscaped area of the former MSB to become First Fleet Park.
- 2010: Work begins on MCA extension over the existing car park.

== Heritage listing ==
As of 28 July 2010, the Sydney Cove West Archaeological Precinct is a site of archaeological significance as evidence of some of the earliest colonial and maritime infrastructure of the convict settlement of Australia.

The site has outstanding and unique historical significance for the identified, predictive and potential archaeology of: the first Government naval dockyards established in Australia (1797) that were improved and enlarged by Governor Macquarie (1818–22); the Commissariat Stores buildings constructed by Governor Macquarie (1810 and 1812); the seawall constructed for Circular Quay (1840s–1850s); the first public wharf built in the colony (c. 1798); the colony's first market place (c. 1807–11), the first post office (c. 1811), the Colonial Storekeepers Building (1823) and one of the colony's earliest commercial and residential precincts that included the residences and premises of important early emancipists Mary Reibey and Isaac Nichols (dating from c. 1798). The site may also contain remains associated with pre-1788 Aboriginal occupation of the area.

The site has state significance as a convict landing place. The general area for the landing of the First Fleet is likely to have been the western foreshores of Sydney Cove, somewhere north of the former Maritime Services Board building. The Third Fleet are known to have landed at the Hospital Wharf in 1791. Sydney Cove West Archaeological Precinct has state significance for its associations with Governor John Hunter, who established the colonial dockyard in 1797; with the military administrator Lieutenant Colonel Joseph Foveaux who commissioned and started the Commissariat Stores building in 1809; with Governor Macquarie who completed the 1810 and commissioned the 1812 Commissariat Stores buildings and improved and enlarged the dockyard in 1818–22 with additional premises and four new docks; with significant early emancipists Isaac Nichols and Mary Reibey who built their residences, warehouse and the colony's first post office on the site of First Fleet Park between 1798 and 1811; with the convicts of the Third Fleet who disembarked at Hospital Wharf in 1791, and with Lieutenant-Colonel George Barney, colonial engineer, for the construction of this section of Circular Quay between 1844 and 1859.

Sydney Cove is the iconic marker of European settlement of Australia, and a site of historical significance for earliest contact of the Aboriginal people with European colonisers and of consequent Aboriginal dispossession. The site has social significance for the people of Australia as both a site of dispossession and of settlement, being one of the earliest sites of European settlement of the colony of NSW, and a site of over 200 years of continuous European occupation.

The site has social significance for the public debate of 1939 following the demolition of the Commissariat Stores buildings that fostered the beginnings of a public awareness of the heritage of NSW and the formation of the National Trust of Australia, after World War II, in 1949. The site has high research potential through the large extant archaeological remains on the site. Sites containing earliest 19th-century (and potentially late 18th-century) archaeological remains are very rare in Australia. The Sydney Cove West Archaeological Precinct is a very rare archaeological resource due to the extent of late twentieth-century disturbance of most early sites of this nature. It is potentially capable of answering questions about the earliest years of European settlement in Australia and represents a finite, rare and endangered resource.

Sydney Cove West Archaeological Precinct was listed on the New South Wales State Heritage Register on 5 August 2011 having satisfied the following criteria.

The place is important in demonstrating the course, or pattern, of cultural or natural history in New South Wales.

The item has historical significance as the site of: the first Government dockyards established in Australia in 1797; the colony's main Commissariat Stores buildings of 1810 and 1812; the first public wharf built in the colony, (dating from c. 1798) the colony's first market place (c. 1807–1811); first post office (dating from c. 1808); one of the colony's earliest commercial and residential precincts (dating from c. 1798) that included the residences and premises of important early emancipists Mary Reibey and Isaac Nichols, and the first (Semi) Circular Quay construction of the 1840s and 1850s. The documentary, map, pictorial and archaeological evidence demonstrates the exceptional significance of the site's unique historical association with the first decades of European penal settlement, of significant government, private commercial and maritime activity of the convict period, and of the sites continued use as the main dockyard of the colony throughout most of the convict period until at least the 1830s and possibly into the 1850s.

The layout and fabric of the Macquarie docks has been preserved to a considerable extent by the transformation of the site in the 1840s and 1850s which saw the four docks infilled and landlocked by reclamation to create the western arm of Circular Quay. Recent archaeological investigations have demonstrated remnant intact fabric of the Government naval dockyards that were improved and extended by Governor Macquarie in 1818–22 from the original dockyards established by Governor Hunter in 1797, and of the 1810 Commissariat Stores building. The site has exceptional state significance for the identified archaeology of two of the four docks built by Governor Macquarie and of the Commissariat Stores building of 1810. This was the largest built work in the colony at the time. It remained a significant example of the earliest colonial infrastructure and in continuous use for 130 years by naval and government departments and commercial tenants until its demolition in 1939 for the Maritime Services Board headquarters (now the Museum of Contemporary Art).

The site is also evidence of the construction of (Semi) Circular Quay in the 1840s and 1850s which was a major colonial engineering work of the mid-nineteenth century. Recent ground penetrating radar survey of First Fleet Park indicates potential archaeology of the early commercial and residential precinct that included buildings associated with Isaac Nicholls and Mary Reibey. The site has state significance as a convict landing place. The general area for the landing of the First Fleet is likely to have been the western foreshores of Sydney Cove, somewhere north of the former Maritime Services Board building. The Third Fleet are known to have landed at the Hospital Wharf in 1791. It is also significant in the context of Sydney Cove as the location of earliest contact of the Aboriginal people with European colonisers and as a site of earliest Aboriginal dispossession by European settlement.

The place has a strong or special association with a person, or group of persons, of importance of cultural or natural history of New South Wales's history.

The site is associated with Governor John Hunter, who established the colonial dockyard in 1797; with the military administrator Lieutenant Colonel Joseph Foveaux who commissioned and started the Commissariat Stores building in 1809; with Governor Macquarie who completed the 1810 and commissioned the 1812 Commissariat Stores buildings and who improved and enlarged the dockyard in 1818–22 with additional premises and four new docks; with significant, early emancipists Isaac Nichols and Mary Reibey who built their residences, warehouse and the colony's first post office on the site of First Fleet Park between c.1798 and 1811; with the convicts of the Third Fleet who disembarked at Hospital Wharf in 1791, and with Lieutenant-Colonel George Barney, colonial engineer, for the construction of this section of Circular Quay between c.1844 and 1859.

The place is important in demonstrating aesthetic characteristics and/or a high degree of creative or technical achievement in New South Wales.

The item is not significant under this criterion.

The place has a strong or special association with a particular community or cultural group in New South Wales for social, cultural or spiritual reasons.

Sydney Cove is the iconic marker of European settlement of Australia, and a site of earliest Aboriginal dispossession. The site has social significance for the people of Australia as both a site of dispossession and of settlement. It is one of the earliest sites of European settlement of the colony of NSW that demonstrates over 200 years of continuous European occupation. It is also one of the earliest sites of Aboriginal dispossession. The demolition of the Commissariat Stores buildings in 1939 (being among the earliest landmark colonial buildings that had survived in use for 130 years) marked one of the earliest public debates on the merit of demolishing historic buildings in the name of "progress". This demolition fostered the beginnings of a public awareness of the heritage of NSW and the formation of the National Trust of Australia, after World War II, in 1949.

The place has potential to yield information that will contribute to an understanding of the cultural or natural history of New South Wales.

The site may contain remains associated with pre-1788 Aboriginal occupation of the area, although it is likely that any remains may have been destroyed by later construction activities. The site contains the identified and predictive archaeology of the first colonial Government dockyard in Australia (dating from 1797 and enlarged by Governor Macquarie 1818–22); the 1810 and 1812 Commissariat Stores buildings, and the 1840s and 1850s seawall constructed for Circular Quay. The site contains the potential archaeology of some of the earliest residential and commercial buildings of the colony (including the first post office) that were associated with prominent emancipists Isaac Nichols and Mary Reibey, as well as the colony's first public wharf (dating from 1798) and the colony's first market place (c. 1807–11). The docks, in association with other aspects of the Dockyard, are likely to contain archaeological structures, features and deposits that will inform us about early maritime practices associated with shipbuilding, maintenance and repair. These remains may also inform us about the day-to-day activities in the Dockyard and the convicts who worked there. The site has high research potential through the large extant archaeological remains on the site. The archaeological resource has the potential to provide details on many questions that cannot be addressed in any other way. Sites containing 18th-century archaeological remains are very rare in Australia and these have the potential to address questions about the earliest years of European settlement in Australia.

The place possesses uncommon, rare or endangered aspects of the cultural or natural history of New South Wales.

The docks are the earliest stone docks built in Australia. This was the first government and naval dockyard in Australia. 18th-century archaeological remains are very rare in Australia and this site contains the substantial remains of a dockyard begun in 1797 and enlarged and extended 1818–22. It contains the archaeological remains of the 1840s and 1850s seawall of Circular Quay - a major colonial engineering work of the time - as well as the 1810 and 1812 Commissariat Stores (the 1810 building being the largest building in the colony at the time, which remained in use until 1939). It contains the potential archaeology of the first public wharf, the first post office and the first market place. It is a very rare resource which is potentially capable of answering questions about the earliest years of European settlement in Australia. Due to the extent of late twentieth-century disturbance of most early sites of this nature, any area with potential for in situ preservation of relics from nineteenth-century Sydney, and particularly the early part of the century or prior to 1800, represent a finite, rare and endangered resource.

The place is important in demonstrating the principal characteristics of a class of cultural or natural places/environments in New South Wales.

The item is unique in the history of European settlement of Australia and is not therefore significant for its representative values.

== See also ==
- Australian non-residential architectural styles
- Australian residential architectural styles
- Cadman's Cottage
- History of Sydney
- Museum of Contemporary Art Australia
