= Exit (play) =

Exit is an Australian play by Dymphna Cusack. She described it as a "tongue in cheek comedy".

Originally written for the stage it was adapted for radio by Joy Hollyer in 1957.

== Premise ==
"Mark Garrett, at thirty, has written one successful book and is at work on another when he comes under the influence of Theodore Cavendish, a man of sixty, founder of a new philosophy Fifth Dimensionalism. This philosophy preaches the utter worthlessness of life. Theodore proclaims that the first man who seeks his own liberation will be the first hero and martyr of Fifth Dimensionalism. Mark finds himself cast for this role But he is disconcerted when he finds that arrangements for his passing are being taken calmly by his friends and relatives."

== Cast of 1957 Radio Production ==
- Ray Barret as Mark Garrett
- Dinah Shearing as Miranda
- Allan Trevor as Theodore Cavendish
- Lyndall Barbour as Professor Garrett
- Fiandel as Frederick Lewis
- Gordon Glenwright as Gasman
- Lola Brooks as LJsa Meade
- Richard Meikle
