= Say No to Death =

Book by Dymphna Cusack

- Author: Dymphna Cusack
- Language: English
- Genre: Fiction
- Publisher: Heinemann
- Publication date: 1951
- Publication place: Australia
- Media type: Print
- Pages: 324pp
- Preceded by: Come in Spinner
- Followed by: Southern Steel

Say No to Death (1951) is a novel by Australian writer Dymphna Cusack. It was originally published in Australia by Heinemann, and later in the US by William Morrow under the title The Sun in My Hands.

== Story outline ==
Set in Sydney following the war, the novel follows the medical journey of Jan, a young woman suffering from tuberculosis, and her struggles to gain any help from a Government health service struggling for funds.

== Critical reception ==
A reviewer in The Age was impressed by the novel: "'A novel built entirely around a social injustice is a rarity, but with competence and courage Dymphna Cusack, in Say No to Death, has presented the subject of the tuberculosis patient and, in a story of heroism, pathos and great sympathy, put the case for the sick civilian at the mercy of a Government — a Government and a people — who respond to the needs of the scourge of war so much more readily than to the scourge of illness...This is a book well worth reading, as much for the story as for the message it carries."

A reviewer in The Mercury had a similar view: "In painting her characters all typically Australian - Miss Cusack has reached unusual literary heights. She shows a deep knowledge of the vagaries of human nature. The unexpected, courageous ending gives the final touch to a novel which must rank high in Australian literature."

== Publication history ==
- Heinemann, Australia, 1951
- William Morrow, US, 1952, under the title The Sun in My Hands
- Seven Seas Publishers, Germany, 1959
- Angus & Robertson, Australia, 1967; and reprinted in 1974
- Cedric Chivers, UK, 1973

The novel was also translated into Russian (1961), Norwegian (1963), Lithuanian (1963), Romanian (1965), Hungarian (1968), Czech (1969), German (1970), and Georgian (1975).

== See also ==
- 1951 in Australian literature
