= A Bough in Hell =

1971 novel by Australian writer Dymphna Cusack

- Author: Dymphna Cusack
- Language: English
- Genre: Fiction
- Publisher: Heinemann
- Publication date: 1971
- Publication place: Australia
- Media type: Print
- Pages: 285 pp.
- ISBN: 0434159034
- Preceded by: The Half-Burnt Tree
- Followed by: -

A Bough in Hell (1971) is a novel by Australian writer Dymphna Cusack. It was originally published by Heinemann in Australia in 1971.

It was Dymphna Cusack's last novel.

== Synopsis ==
Roslyn Blackie is a 43-year-old woman living in Rushcutters Bay, Sydney. With her daughter grown-up and no longer needing her, and with her husband away for extended period due to his naval officer duties, Roslyn drinks to relieve the boredom and loneliness. Following an extensive drinking episode she is sent to Beauchamp Hall mental institution in country New South Wales under the Inebriates Act. During her time in the institution she finds herself useful as seamstress and slowly overcomes her addiction.

== Publication history ==
After its original publication in 1971 in the UK by publisher Heinemann the novel was later reprinted in Australia in 2012 by Allen and Unwin.

== See also ==
- 1971 in Australian literature
