= The Sun in Exile =

Book by Dymphna Cusack

- Author: Dymphna Cusack
- Language: English
- Genre: Fiction
- Publisher: Constable, London
- Publication date: 1955
- Publication place: Australia
- Media type: Print
- Pages: 265pp
- Preceded by: Southern Steel
- Followed by: Heatwave in Berlin

The Sun in Exile (1955) is a novel by Australian writer Dymphna Cusack.

== Story outline ==
The narrator of the story, Alexandra Pendlebury, is a middle-aged spinster who writes travel books. On a sea voyage from Australia to England she shares a cabin with Vicky, a young Australian artist. All is well on the voyage until the ship docks in Jamaica and picks up a number of passengers. The West Indians bring out the inherent racism in a number of the white Australian travellers though Vicky becomes rather attached to Lance Olumide. In England Alexandra and Vicky maintain their friendship and they are joined by Lance when he and Vicky become engaged.

== Critical reception ==
Helen Frizell in The Australian Women's Weekly was in no doubt about her feelings for the book: "'Dymphna Cusack, in beautifully written prose, shows how bigotry and unkindness will eventually damp down the fires of their love and ambitions, so that in the end even the hearths of their hearts will be cold. Dymphna Cusack's thoughtfulness, narrative power, and sincerity make The Sun in Exile her best book to date.

Victor Valentine, a reviewer in The Argus, was impressed with the writing: "Although the characters indulge in intermittent tambourine banging it does not matter because the tale is told in the first person by a wonderful, unforgettable spinster writer of 60, named Miss Alexandra Pendlebury. Miss Pendlebury, rich, much travelled, gently snobbish, both about people and culture, selfish, lonely, and superfluous, is a superb touching portrait."

== See also ==
- 1955 in Australian literature
