= Kent Hotel =

Former pub in Sydney, Australia

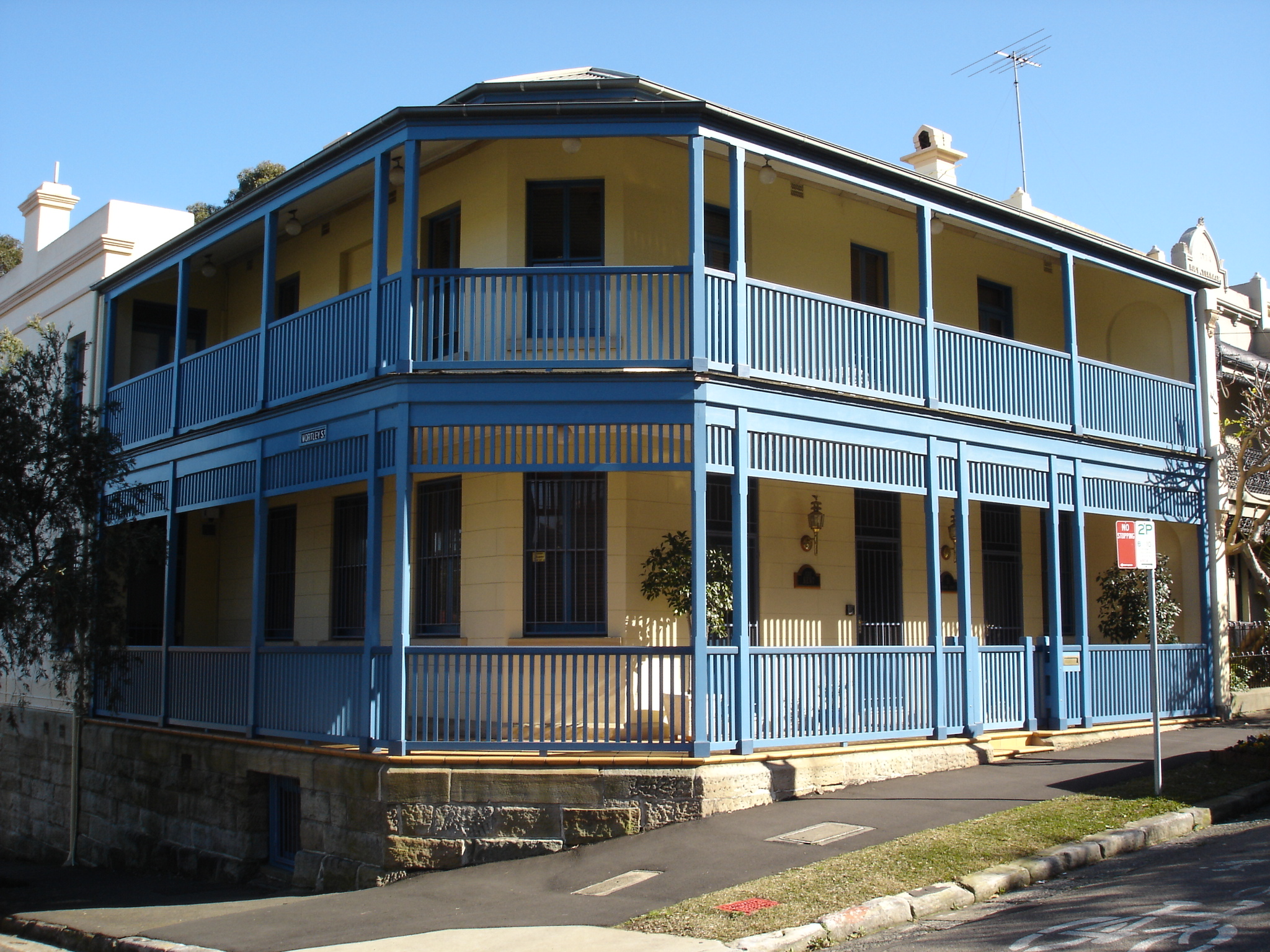
- Kent Hotel today
- Interactive map of the Kent Hotel area

General information
- Status: Closed; private residence
- Location: 51 Palmer Street, Balmain, New South Wales, Australia
- Coordinates: 33°51′35″S 151°10′50″E
- Opened: 1865
- Closed: 1976

The Kent Hotel is a former pub in the inner-western Sydney suburb of Balmain, in the state of New South Wales, Australia.

Workers from the nearby Booth's Saw Mill and later Lever and Kitchen, were regular patrons at the hotel.

The building is now a private residence but retains a sign with the words The Kent on the front veranda as a reminder of its historic past.

== Popular culture ==
The pub was used as the main location for the Australian film Caddie, starring Helen Morse and Jack Thompson. After closing in 1976, the site was reopened for a time as Caddies Restaurant, named after its association with the film.

The hotel is mentioned in the 2014 Man Booker Prize winning novel The Narrow Road to the Deep North.
