= Southern Steel (novel) =

1953 novel by Dymphna Cusack

- Author: Dymphna Cusack
- Language: English
- Genre: Fiction
- Publisher: Constable, London
- Publication date: 1953
- Publication place: Australia
- Media type: Print
- Pages: 409pp
- Preceded by: Say No to Death
- Followed by: The Sun in Exile

Southern Steel (1953) is a novel by Australian writer Dymphna Cusack. It was originally published in the UK by Constable.

== Synopsis ==
Set in Newcastle, New South Wales, during World War II, the story concerns three brothers who all work at varying levels of a local steel maker.

== Critical reception ==
A reviewer in The Sydney Morning Herald noted that the book was originally drafted in 1946 and "because of that fact it conveys rather well at times the wartime moods of urgency, anxiety, and forced enjoyment. It is a period piece. Heard in the present day, it speaks as it were with a raised voice."

In The Bulletin a reviewer gave the book only faint praise: "The love- stories, at any rate, are well-handled — Miss Cusack is at her best in explaining in action the apparent contradictions of behavior of women in love; with men she is, like most women-writers, more eager than able to be right."

== See also ==
- 1953 in Australian literature
