= Shallow Cups =

1933 Australian play

Shallow Cups is a 1933 Australian play by Dymphna Cusack.

The play was published in a 1934 collection of Australian plays Eight Plays for Australians. It was staged a number of times through the 1930s and 1940s by amateur theatres in Sydney, Melbourna and England. It won a Drama League prize in Sydney, and was on the Playwrights’ Advisory Board’s list of recommended Australian plays.

Leslie Rees called it "part-dramatic, part-satirical, with touches of the occult... the play was for a while quite popular with amateur groups."

== Premise ==
A dead girl's friends and relations are given the option to resurrect her but fail.
