= Heatwave in Berlin =

Novel by Australian author Dymphna Cusack

- Author: Dymphna Cusack
- Language: English
- Publisher: Heinemann, Melbourne
- Publication date: 1961
- Media type: Print (hardback & paperback)
- Pages: 268 pp
- Preceded by: The Sun in Exile
- Followed by: Picnic Races

Heatwave in Berlin (1961) is a novel by Australian writer Dymphna Cusack.

== Plot summary ==
Australian Joy von Muhler is returning with her husband Stephen to Berlin, in the early 1960s, to visit his family. The pair have been married for 10 years after Stephen migrated to Australia following World War II. They return to a Berlin still struggling with damage caused in the war, and to a wealthy family still hiding secrets about their war-time involvement.

== Reviews ==
A reviewer in The Canberra Times was not impressed with the novel: "Dymphna Cusack's new documentary novel, Heatwave in Berlin, has the pace, the excitement and something of the basic hollowness of a thriller...What it makes as a novel, however, is something which cannot be taken very seriously. The characters have the larger-than-life quality of figures in a melodrama, and they speak with something of the same staginess."

== Publishing history ==
After its initial publication by Heinemann in Australia in 1961 it was then republished as follows:

- Readers Book Club, Australia 1962
- Pan, UK, 1963
- Cedric Chivers, UK 1972

The novel was also translated into Norwegian, French, Danish, Dutch, and German in 1961; Hungarian and Russian in 1962; Bulgarian in 1963; Romanian and Estonian in 1964; Albanian in 1965; Latvian in 1966; and Uzbek in 1971.

== See also ==
- 1961 in Australian literature
