= Come in Spinner =

1951 novel by Dymphna Cusack and Florence James

Come In Spinner
- First edition (publ. Heinemann)
- Author: Dymphna Cusack and Florence James
- Language: English
- Genre: Fiction
- Publisher: Heinemann
- Publication date: 1951
- Publication place: Australia
- Media type: Print
- Pages: 416
- Preceded by: Pioneers on Parade
- Followed by: Say No to Death

Come In Spinner is an Australian novel by Dymphna Cusack and Florence James, originally published in 1951 and set in Sydney at the end of the Second World War.

== Name ==
The title refers to a phrase used in the Australian gambling game of two-up. "Come in spinner" or "Righto, come in spinner" is the call given by the game manager when all bets are placed and the coins are ready to be tossed.

== Plot ==
The book tells the story of three women, Claire, Guinea and Deb, who are co-workers in the beauty salon of an exclusive Sydney hotel. The story weaves together these characters with their familial and romantic relationships, as they struggle to manage the realities of working for the privileged upper classes, to whom no rules apply, while their own families cope with wartime deaths and losses, rationing, government manpower recruitment and stiflingly conservative attitudes surrounding the role and perception of the "acceptable" behaviour of women.

== Publication ==
Cusack and James entered their manuscript in the Daily Telegraph's £1000 novel competition, whose closing date was October 1946. It was judged the winner and the prizemoney handed over, but no announcement was made, and The Telegraph reneged on its commitment to publish the novel, which covered such topics as abortion, adultery, prostitution and rape, as well as promiscuity and the black market. Heinemann published an expurgated version in 1951. The book was reworked from the original MS by Florence James, and was republished in an unexpurgated edition in 1987 for Richard Walsh of Angus and Robertson, partly due to the interest caused by the development of a television adaptation of the book. Cusack was not able to take part in this restoration or witness the renewed popularity of the novel as she died in 1981.

== Radio adaptation ==
In 1954 the novel was adapted as a serial for radio. It was popular but controversial, and was axed by 3UZ Melbourne after two episodes due to listener complaints.

== Film and television ==
In the 1950s, film director Jack Lee expressed interest in making a movie out of the novel.

A miniseries was made in 1989.
