= Picnic Races (novel) =

1962 novel by Dymphna Cusack

- Author: Dymphna Cusack
- Language: English
- Publisher: Heinemann, Melbourne
- Publication date: 1962
- Media type: Print (hardback & paperback)
- Pages: 315 pp
- Preceded by: Heatwave in Berlin
- Followed by: Black Lightning

Picnic Races (1962) is a novel by Australian writer Dymphna Cusack.

== Plot summary ==
Set in the fictional Australian country town of Gubba, the novel details the town's preparations for its upcoming centenary celebrations, the social and financial factions in the town and the discovery of something long thought lost.

== Reviews ==
A reviewer in The Canberra Times praised its setting, but was less impressed with its overall worth as a novel: "Picnic Races, Dymphna Cusack's latest novel, is as Australian as a yellow box tree. Her fictional town of Gubba, whose centenary is arranged and celebrated amid a welter of community rivalries, could be any Australian country town from Braidwood to Benalla, or Northam to Normanton....Picnic Races is more than merely evocative of the Australian countryside. The plot is well conceived, the characters realistically drawn, incidents abound including a boisterous near riotous race night ball, with to cap it all, a surprise ending. Perhaps nowhere does the authoress probe deeply into the lives and motives of her characters. Yet her tale of the lovely and expensively educated Eden slowly finding homespun love while Gubba resolves its factional digerences will pass many an hour pleasantly."

== See also ==
- 1962 in Australian literature
