= Comets Soon Pass =

1943 Australian play by Dymphna Cusack

- Original language: English
- Written by: Dymphna Cusack
- Setting: The house of Dr John Smith

Premiere
- Date: 8 October 1943
- Place: Repertory Theatre, Perth

Comets Soon Pass is a 1943 Australian play by Dymphna Cusack. It won the 1943 WA Drama Festival Award. (She had won it the year before with Morning Sacrifice.) The play was produced in Perth and in army camps. Leslie Rees called the play a "political-disquisitory".

According to Cusack's biography the play "was her personal catharsis and artistic reprisal for the defection of her former lover, the novelist Xavier Herbert, and payback to the 'asparagus king' Gordon Edgell, who had tried to damn her publicly for her activism on behalf of unemployed youth."

The play was published in a 1950 collection of Cusack's plays.

== Premise ==
A group gather in the house of a doctor during a flood. They include a squatter's wife, an artist and his wife (who is the ex-wife of the doctor), a trade union organiser and a young person.

== Reception ==
Reviewing the debut production the West Australian wrote "There was some good dialogue and tense moments, marred somewhat by the lack of familiarity with lines.

Reviewing the published play the Adelaide News wrote it had "a Galsworthian theme, has characters - hard-hearted capitalist, union organiser, wronged girl, philandering artist, and a woman again meeting her first husband - talking with unnatural glibness in an obviously contrived situation." The Advertiser called it an "energetic attempt" but "the characters stilted, the settings unoriginal."
