= Manpower Directorate (Australia) =

Division of the Government of Australia

The Manpower Directorate was a division of the Government of Australia established in January, 1942 to be responsible for active service and support industry recruitment during World War II to combat labour shortages in strategic areas. The agency had extensive power and reach in furtherance of this effort:

In effect, Manpower imposed industrial conscription. It issued identity cards to all Australian adults, had the sole power to decide who worked where, and raided hotels and race tracks rounding up those evading war work.
