= Call Up Your Ghosts =

1945 Australian stage play

- Written by: Dymphna Cusack
- Original language: English

Premiere
- Date premiered: 6 October 1945
- Place premiered: New Theatre, Melbourne

Call Up Your Ghosts is a 1945 Australian stage play by Dymphna Cusack and Miles Franklin. It was a satire of the Australian publishing industry and its neglect of Australian writers, whose ghosts return to create trouble in a bookshop where their work is being used to prop up table legs.

The play debuted at the New Theatre in Melbourne.

It was joint winner of the New Theatre's One-act Play Competition of 1945 sharing first prize with Sailor's Girl by Ric Throssell. The play was published in Penguin Anthology of Australian Women’s Writing, ed. Dale Spender, Ringwood, 1988.
