= Florence James =

Australian writer

- Born: Florence Gertrude James; 2 September 1902; Gisborne, New Zealand
- Died: 25 August 1993 (aged 90); Sydney, New South Wales
- Occupation: Novelist
- Writing career
- Language: English
- Years active: 1946-1990
- Notable work: Come in Spinner

Florence Gertrude James (2 September 1902 – 25 August 1993) was an Australian writer and literary agent, born in New Zealand.

== Life ==
James was born in Gisborne, New Zealand, daughter of a refrigeration engineer with a successful consulting practice.

She moved with her family to Sydney in 1920, studying at Sydney University 1923–26. It was there that her friendship with Dymphna Cusack began, later to become a notable collaboration. They were both involved in debating and theatre; they shared a feminist, unionist and pacifist outlook. Both were much later to become opponents of nuclear weapons.

Around 1930 she moved to London, working as a journalist, briefly sharing a room with Christina Stead. While there she married lawyer William J. "Pym" Heyting in 1932 and had two daughters, Julie and Frances, by him. They returned to Sydney in 1938. He joined the RAAF as an Intelligence officer, and became a Wing Commander.

She worked as Public Appeals Officer for the Royal Prince Alfred Hospital from 1940 to the end of 1944, when she resigned. From 1945 to 1947 she, her daughters, Dymphna Cusack and her niece shared a rented cottage 'Pinegrove' at Hazelbrook in the Blue Mountains. It was there that they collaborated on a children's book Four Winds and a Family and Come In Spinner, which was to become the most successful book about life in wartime Sydney. It won the Daily Telegraph's £1000 novel competition in 1948; the prizemoney was handed over but not announced. Publishers demanded substantial edits to the book, which was not published until 1951.

She returned with her daughters to London in 1947 to join her husband who was stationed there. They divorced in May 1949. She remained there until 1963, working as a literary agent, initially for Constable and Company, where authors she signed included Mary Durack, Sylvia Townsend Warner and Colin Johnson (aka Mudrooroo Narogin). She became active in the Campaign for Nuclear Disarmament, participating in the Aldermaston March and activities of Bertrand Russell's Committee of One Hundred.

She returned to Australia in 1963 and joined the Religious Society of Friends (Quakers) in 1968. In 1984 she restored the unexpurgated manuscript of Come In Spinner for Richard Walsh of Angus and Robertson. She died in 1993 at the Wesley Heights retirement village at Manly, where her friend and collaborator Dymphna Cusack died twelve years earlier.

== Works ==
- Four Winds and a Family by Dymphna Cusack and Florence James (1946) pub. Shakespeare Head Press
- Come in Spinner by Dymphna Cusack and Florence James (1951) pub. Heinemann
