= Norma Davis =

Australian poet

Norma L. Davis
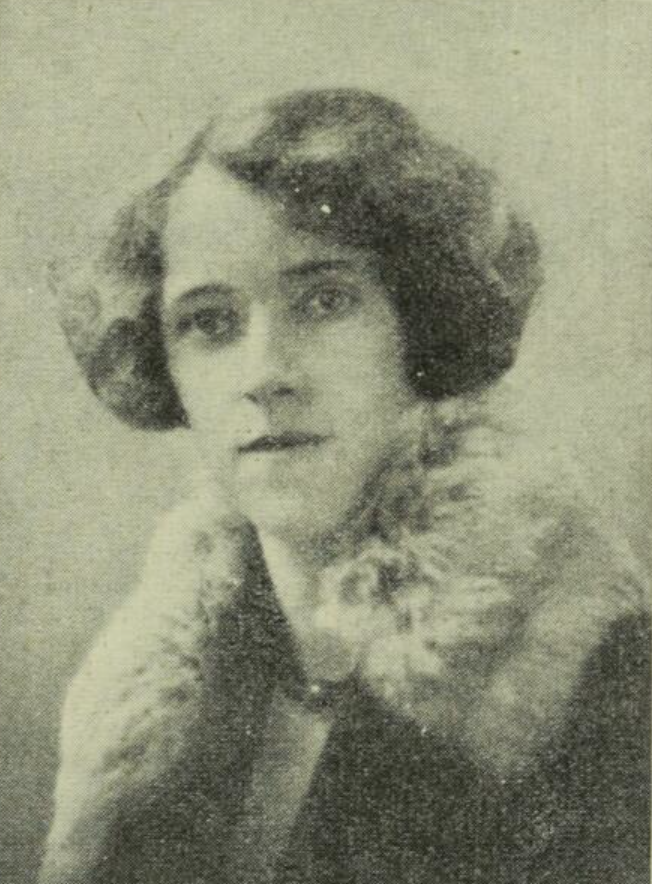
- Davis in 1931
- Born: Norma Lochlenah Davis; 10 April 1905; Glenora, Tasmania, Australia
- Died: 5 November 1945 (aged 40); Perth, Tasmania, Australia
- Occupation: Poet
- Writing career
- Pen name: Glenarvon; Malda Norris
- Language: English

Norma Lochlenah Davis (10 April 1905 – 5 November 1945) was an Australian poet.

Born in Glenora, Tasmania, David moved with her parents and younger sister to Perth, Tasmania, where she lived in a house that is now the Jolly Farmer Inn. Davis remained there until her death.

Davis died of cancer at her home, Glenarvon, Perth on 5 November 1945. Her remains were privately cremated.

== Working life ==
Davis began publishing poetry in the Australian Woman's Mirror under an array of pseudonyms. She contributed poetry to Australian literary magazines such as Meanjin, The Bulletin, Poetry and Jindyworobak. It was only in the early 1940s, shortly before her death, that Davis concentrated fully on writing.

== Bibliography ==
=== Poetry collections ===
- Earth Cry (1943)
- I, the Thief (1944)
