= J. L. Ranken =

Australian author (1878–1945)

- Born: 1878
- Died: 2 July 1945
- Awards: Member of the Order of the British Empire

Jean Logan Ranken MBE (1878–1945) was an Australian poet and novelist.

J. L. Ranken was born in 1878, the daughter of John Logan Campbell Ranken, a Scottish migrant to Australia, and Alice Catherine Ranken. Her uncle was surveyor George Ranken.

She published a number of poems, including the poetry collection Dream Horses and Other Verses (1912). Her poem "The First Night in Sydney Harbour" was anthologized in The Oxford Book of Australian Women's Verse (1995). She published a science fiction novel, Tzane (1926), about the invention of a dangerous chemical formula. She was an editor of and contributor to Murder Pie (1936), a collaboratively written mystery novel.

She was active in arts and historical organizations in Sydney, including Australian Authors Week, the British Drama League, the Pageant Committee, and the Pioneers' Club.

Ranken was appointed a Member of the Order of the British Empire in the 1939 New Year Honours for her charity work.

Ranken died on 2 July 1945.

== Bibliography ==
- Dream Horses and Other Verses. Melbourne : Australasian Authors' Agency, 1912
- Tzane : A Novel. London : Nelson, 1926
- Murder Pie. J. L. Ranken (editor), Jane Clunies Ross (editor), Sydney : Angus and Robertson, 1936
