= Dymphna Cusack =

Australian author and playwright (1902–1981)

Dymphna Cusack AM
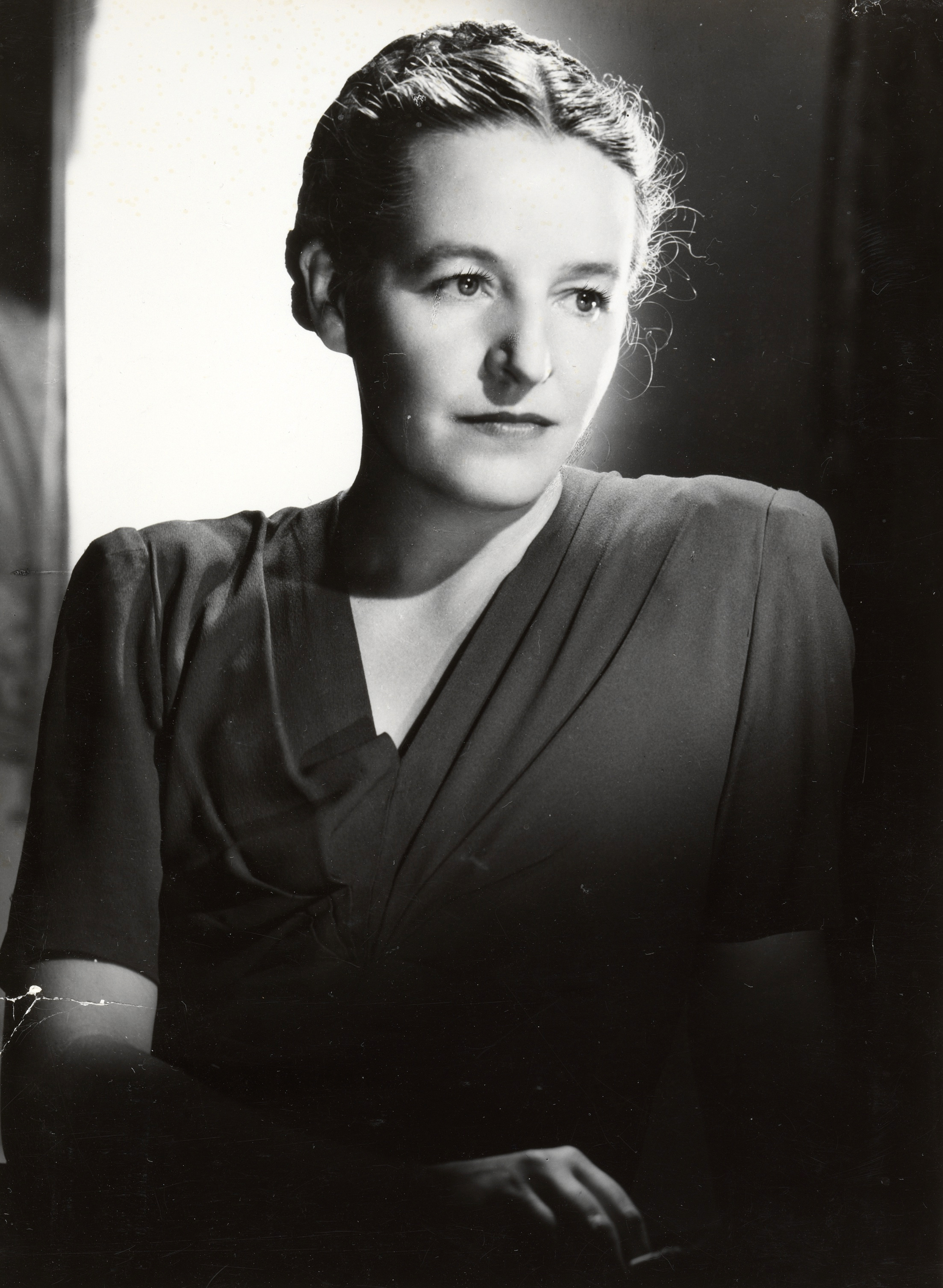
- Dymphna Cusack, 1947
- Born: 21 September 1902
- Died: 19 October 1981 (aged 79)
- Education: University of Sydney
- Occupations: Author, playwright

Ellen Dymphna Cusack AM (21 September 1902 – 19 October 1981) was an Australian writer and playwright. She also wrote as Atalanta.

== Personal life ==
Born in Wyalong, New South Wales, Cusack was educated at Saint Ursula's College, Armidale, New South Wales and graduated from the University of Sydney with an honours degree in arts and a diploma in Education. She worked as a teacher until she retired in 1944 for health reasons. Her illness was confirmed in 1978 as multiple sclerosis. She died at Manly, New South Wales on 19 October 1981.

== Career ==
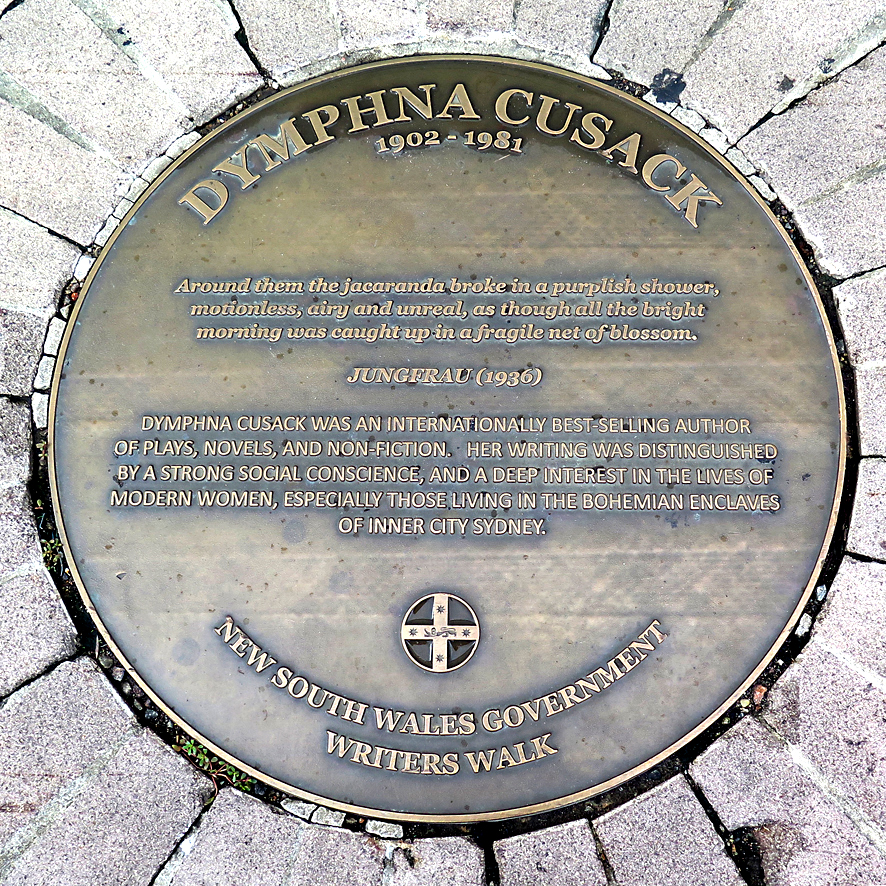
Dymphna Cusack memorial plaque in Sydney Writers Walk at Circular Quay

Cusack early career was as a school teacher in NSW, including Sydney Girls High School where she wrote and produced plays for the students.

Cusack wrote twelve novels (two of which were collaborations), eleven plays, three travel books, two children's books and one non-fiction book. Her collaborative novels were Pioneers on Parade (1939) with Miles Franklin, and Come In Spinner (1951) with Florence James. Cusack's experience of collaborative writing with each of these co-authors, and the challenge of getting published, she described in correspondence as well as with Florence James with whom when she shared a house 'Pinegrove'.

The play Red Sky at Morning was filmed in 1944, starring Peter Finch. The biography Caddie, the Story of a Barmaid, to which Cusack wrote an introduction and helped the author write, was produced as the film Caddie in 1976. The novel Come In Spinner was produced as a television series by the Australian Broadcasting Corporation in 1989, and broadcast in March 1990.

== Family ==
Her younger brother, John, was also an author, writing the war novel They Hosed Them Out under the pseudonym John Beede, which was first published in 1965; an expanded edition under the author's real name, John Bede Cusack, was published in 2012 by Wakefield Press, edited and annotated by Robert Brokenmouth.

== Activism ==
Cusack advocated social reform and described the need for reform in her writings. She contributed to the world peace movement during the Cold War era as an antinuclear activist. She and her husband Norman Freehill were members of the Communist Party and they left their entire estates to the Party in their wills.

== Contribution and recognition ==
Cusack was a foundation member of the Australian Society of Authors in 1963. She had refused an Order of the British Empire, but was made a Member of the Order of Australia in 1981 for her contribution to Australian literature.

In 2011, Cusack was one of 11 authors, including Elizabeth Jolley, Manning Clark, and Dorothy Hewett, to be permanently recognised by the addition of brass plaques at the Writers' Walk, Sydney.

== Plays ==
- Safety First, 1927
- Shallow Cups, 1933
- Anniversary, 1935. The play won first prize for an Anzac Fellowship competition for a play on a war theme. Cusack researched it in part on papers of her uncle who died at Gallipoli. The play premiered at the Sydney Conservatorium. It was performed again the following year. In the play, an old digger meets the ghosts of his comrades.
- Red Sky at Morning, performed 1935; published 1942
- Morning Sacrifice, 1943
- Comets Soon Pass, 1943
- Call Up Your Ghosts, with Miles Franklin, 1945
- Stand Still Time, 1946
- Pacific Paradise, 1955

== Novels ==
- Jungfrau (1936)
- Pioneers on Parade (1939) with Miles Franklin
- Come In Spinner (1951) with Florence James
- Say No to Death (1951)
- Southern Steel (1953)
- Caddie, the Story of a Barmaid (1953) [Introduction only]
- The Sun in Exile (1955)
- Heatwave in Berlin (1961)
- Picnic Races (1962)
- Black Lightning (1964)
- The Sun is Not Enough (1967)
- The Half-Burnt Tree (1969)
- A Bough in Hell (1971)

== Radio plays ==
- His Honor Comes to Tea
- Lure of the Inland Sea (1945)
- Mary Reibey (1947)
- Shoulder the Sky
- Exit
- The Golden Girls
- Spartacus

== Nonfiction ==
- Chinese Women Speak. Angus & Robertson. Sydney. 1958.
- Holidays Among the Russians. Heinemann. London. 1964.
- Illyria Reborn. Heinemann. London. 1966.
- Mary Gilmore A Tribute. Australasian Book Society. London. 1965.
- A Window in the Dark. National Library of Australia. Canberra. 1991.

== Children's literature ==
- Kanga-Bee and Kanga-Bo. Botany House. Sydney. 1945.
- Four Winds and a Family with Florence James. Shakespeare Head Press. London. 1947.
