= 1967 in poetry =

Nationality words link to articles with information on the nation's poetry or literature (for instance, Irish or France).

== Events ==
- Poetry International started by Ted Hughes and Patrick Garland
- May 16 – the premiere at Taganka Theater in Moscow of a staged poetical performance Послушайте! ("Listen!"), based on the works of Russian poet Vladimir Mayakovsky. The show is in repertoire until April 1984, is revived in May 1987 and again in repertoire until June 1989.
- Soviet authorities, acting through the Union of Soviet Writers, deny popular Russian poet Andrei Voznesensky permission to visit New York for a poetry reading at Lincoln Center, apparently because of remarks the poet made on a previous U.S. visit that were deemed pro-American, although the official reason is that Voznesensky's health is too poor for him to travel. In response, Voznesensky excoriates the literary union in a letter he sends to Pravda, which the newspaper refuses to publish. Nevertheless, copies of the letter, accusing the literary-union authorities of "lies, lies, lies, bad manners and lies", are distributed widely in literary circles. On July 2, Voznesensky strongly criticizes the literary union in a poem he reads at the Taganka Theater in Moscow. The union demands a retraction, but he refuses. According to Voznesensky's 2010 obituary in The New York Times, "The issue was ultimately smoothed over".
- New Writers Press is founded by poets Michael Smith and Trevor Joyce with Smith's wife Irene in Dublin to publish poetry.

== Works published in English ==
Listed by nation where the work was first published and again by the poet's native land, if different; substantially revised works listed separately:

- Pentti Saarikoski, Helsinki, a selection of poetry in translation from Finnish
- Wole Soyinka, Idanre, and Other Poems

=== Australia ===
- Geoffrey Dutton, Poems Soft and Loud
- Rodney Hall, Eyewitness : Poems
- Dorothy Hewett, The Hidden Journey
- Les Murray, "An Absolutely Ordinary Rainbow"
- David Rowbotham, Bungalow and Hurricane : new poems
- Thomas Shapcott, A Taste of Salt Water : Poems
- Douglas Stewart, Collected Poems 1936–1967
- Chris Wallace-Crabbe, The Rebel General

=== Canada ===
- Margaret Atwood, The Circle Game, won a Governor General's award and "sold out immediately"
- John Robert Colombo, Abracadabra
- Louis Dudek, Atlantis. Montreal: Delta Canada, 1967.
- D. G. Jones, Phrases from Orpheus
- Irving Layton, Periods of the Moon: Poems. Toronto: McClelland and Stewart.
- Dennis Lee, Kingdom of Absence. Toronto: Anansi.
- Dorothy Livesay, The Unquiet Bed.
- Eli Mandel, An Idiot Joy, Governor General's Award 1967.
- Michael Ondaatje, The Dainty Monsters, Toronto: Coach House Press
- P. K. Page, Cry Ararat!: Poems New and Selected
- Al Purdy, North of Summer, a diary in verse recounting his stay on Baffin Island
- F. R. Scott, Trouvailles: Poems from Prose. Montreal: Delta Canada.
- A. J. M. Smith:
  - Editor, A Book of Modern Canadian Verse, anthology
  - Poems: New and Collected
- Raymond Souster, As Is. Toronto: Oxford University Press.
- Raymond Souster, editor, New Wave Canada anthology of younger poets
- Miriam Waddington, The Glass Trumpet
- George Woodcock, Selected Poems of George Woodcock, Toronto: Clarke, Irwin, Canada

=== India ===
- A. K. Ramanujan, The Striders, Delhi: Oxford University Press
- Arvind Krishna Mehrotra, Woodcuts on Paper
- Kamala Das, The Descendants, Calcutta: Writers Workshop, India.
- Lawrence Bantleman:
  - Kanchenjunga, Calcutta: Writers Workshop, India.
  - New Poems, Calcutta: Writers Workshop, India
- Sukanta Chaudhuri, Poems, Calcutta: Writers Workshop, India
- Margaret Chatterjee, The Spring and the Spectacle, Calcutta: Writers Workshop, India
- A. Madhavan, Poems, Calcutta: Writers Workshop, India
- R. Rabindranath Menon, Dasavatara and Other Poems, Calcutta: Writers Workshop, India
- S. R. Mokashi-Punekar, The Pretender, Calcutta: Writers Workshop, India
- Mohinder Monga, Through the Night Raptly, Calcutta: Writers Workshop, India
- Tarpiti Mookerji, The Golden Road to Samarkand, Calcutta: Writers Workshop, India
- Suniti Namjoshi:
  - Poems, Calcutta: Writers Workshop, India
  - The Jackass and the Lady, Calcutta: Writers Workshop, India
- Stanley P. Rajiva, The Permanent Element, Calcutta: Writers Workshop, India
- S. Santhi, Lamplight in the Sun, Calcutta: Writers Workshop, India
- O. P. Bhagat, Another Planet, New Delhi: Lakshmi Books
- Sankara Krishna Chettur, Golden Stars and Other Poems, Madras: Higginbotham
- Harindranath Chattopadhyaya, Virgins and Vineyards, Bombay: Pearl Pub.
- Raul De Loyola Furtado, also known as Joseph Furtado (died 1947), Selected Poems, third edition, revised; Bombay: published by Philip Furdado (first edition 1942; second edition, revised 1947), posthumously published
- Monika Varma, translator, A Bunch of Tagore Poems, Calcutta: Writers Workshop
- Kushwant Singh, editor, The Asian PEN Anthology, Taplinger

=== New Zealand ===
- Fleur Adcock, Tigers, London: Oxford University Press (New Zealand poet who moved to England in 1963)
- James K. Baxter:
  - The Lion Skin: Poems
  - Aspects of Poetry in New Zealand, critical study
  - The Man on the Horse, critical study
- Alistair Campbell, Blue Rain: Poems, Wellington: Wai-te-ata Press

=== United Kingdom ===
- Fleur Adcock, Tigers; New Zealander living in and published in the United Kingdom
- Kingsley Amis, A Look Round the Estate
- Patricia Beer, Just Like the Resurrection
- Martin Bell, Collected Poems, 1937–1966
- D. M. Black, With Decorum
- Alan Brownjohn, The Lions' Mouths
- T. S. Eliot, Poems Written in Early Youth, a second edition of the 1950 book of poems edited and privately printed by John Hayward (posthumous)
- Janet Frame, The Pocket Mirror
- Bryn Griffiths, The Stones Remember, London: J. M. Dent
- Geoffrey Grigson, A Skull in Salop, and Other Poems
- Thom Gunn, Touch
- Libby Houston, A Stained Glass Raree Show, London: Allison and Busby
- Ted Hughes, Wodwo, a collection of poems, a radio play and five stories
- Elizabeth Jennings, Collected Poems, 1967, London: Macmillan
- P. J. Kavanagh, On the Way to the Depot
- Thomas Kinsella, Nightwalker, and Other Poems
- George MacBeth, The Colour of Blood
- Hugh MacDiarmid, pen name of Christopher Murray Grieve; a Scot:
  - A Lap of Honour, with some poems "previously almost unobtainable"
  - Collected Poems, a revised edition
- Roger McGough, Frinck: A Day in the Life Of; and Summer with Monica
- Leslie Norris, Finding Gold
- Brian Patten, Little Johnny's Confession
- Tom Pickard, High on the Walls, used "Geordie" (Newcastle) slang
- James Reeves, Selected Poems, London: Allison and Busby
- Anthony Thwaite, The Stones of Emptiness
- Rosemary Tonks, Iliad of Broken Sentences, London: The Bodley Head
- Vernon Watkins, Selected Poems, 1930-60

==== Anthologies ====
- Edward Lucie-Smith (ed.), The Liverpool Scene anthology featuring work by the Mersey Beat poets Adrian Henri, Roger McGough and Brian Patten (publisher: Donald Carroll)
- The Mersey Sound, 10th volume in the Penguin Modern Poets series, including work by Liverpudlians Adrian Henri, Roger McGough, Brian Patten
- Stephen Bann, Concrete Poetry, poems originally written in English, German, Spanish and Portuguese
- Howard Sergeant, Commonwealth Poems of Today, covering 24 Commonwealth countries, published for The English Association by John Murray in the United Kingdom
- Duncan Glen (ed.), Poems Addressed to Hugh MacDiarmid
- Donald Allen and Robert Creeley (eds), The New Writing in the USA published by Penguin, including work by John Ashbery, William Burroughs, Allen Ginsberg, Jack Kerouac, Frank O'Hara, Charles Olson, prose as well as poetry

=== United States ===
- W. H. Auden, Collected Shorter Poems, 1927-1957, first published in the United Kingdom in 1966; English native published in the United States
- Ted Berrigan, Ron Padgett and Joe Brainard, Bean Spasms, in which no authors were listed for individual poems, although some were written by one poet, some in collaboration.
- Ted Berrigan, Many Happy Returns
- John Berryman, Berryman's Sonnets (New York: Farrar, Straus & Giroux)
- Paul Blackburn:
  - The Reardon Poems
  - The Cities
- Richard Brautigan, All Watched Over by Machines of Loving Grace, including the poem of the same name
- Gwendolyn Brooks, The bitch
- Robert Creeley, Words
- Ed Dorn, The North Atlantic Turbine, Fulcrum Press
- Robert Lowell, Near the Ocean, New York: Farrar, Straus and Giroux
- Carl Rakosi, Amulet (Rakosi's first published volume since 1941)
- W. S. Merwin, The Lice, New York: Atheneum
- Marianne Moore, Complete Poems
- J. R. R. Tolkien, The Road Goes Ever On, English writer, but this book first published in the United States; published in the United Kingdom in 1968
- Reed Whittemore, Poems, New and Selected
- James Wright, Shall We Gather at the River

=== Other in English ===
- Eavan Boland, New Territory, Ireland
- Edward Brathwaite, Rights of Passage, first part of his The Arrivants trilogy, which also includes Masks (1968) and Islands (1969), Caribbean
- Dom Moraes, Beldam & Others, a pamphlet of verse, India
- Lenrie Peters (Gambia), Satellites, London: Heinemann, African Writers Series No. 37

== Works published in other languages ==
Listed by language and often by nation where the work was first published and again by the poet's native land, if different; substantially revised works listed separately:

=== Denmark ===
- Jørgen Gustava Brandt, Ateliers
- Klaus Høeck, Mit-enf-snee, 1967. Nuancer
- Jens Ørnsbo, a new collection of poems
- Klaus Rifbjerg, Fædrelandssang
- Henrik Nordbrandt, Miniaturer
- Jørgen Gustava Brandt, Ateliers ("Studios"), Denmark

=== France ===
- Anne-Marie Albiach, Flammigere
- P. Chaullet, Soudaine écorce
- Lucienne Desnoues, Les Ors
- Jean Daive, Décimale blanche, Mercure de France
- R. Dubillard, Le dirai que je suis tombé
- Jean Follain, D'Après tout
- M. Fombeure, À Chat petit
- Jean Grosjean, Élegies, which won the Prix des Critiques
- Eugene Guilleveic, Euclidiennes
- Edmond Jabès, Yael
- Philippe Jaccottet, Airs
- J. Lebrau, Du Cyprès tourne l'ombre
- Francis Ponge:
  - Le Nouveau Recueil
  - Le Savon
- Raymond Queneau, Courir les rues
- Charles le Quintrec, Stances du verbe amour
- Jacques Roubaud, Σ, forms of "sonnets" arranged in a way reflecting the moves of the board game Go, and with the suggestion that the order might be rearranged; the title comes from the mathematical symbol for "belonging"
- Lilaine Wouters, Le Gel

==== Critical studies ====
- P. de Boisdeffre, La Poésie française de Baudelaire á nos jours
- René Étiemble, Poètes ou faiseurs, a critical study
- M. Guiney, La Poésie de Pierre Reverdy
- G. Sadoul, Aragon
- A. Alter, J. C. Renard

=== German language ===
- Paul Celan, Breathturn (Atemwende)

==== Germany ====
- Günter Grass, Ausgefragt (West Germany)
- Elfriede Jelinek, Lisas Schatten (Austrian writer published in West Germany)
- Karl Mickel, Vita nova mea (East Germany)

=== Hebrew ===
==== Israel ====
- B. Pomerantz, Shirim ("Poems"), introduction by N. Peniel (posthumous)
- N. Shtern, Bain ha-Arpilim ("Amid the Mists"), preface by A. Broides
- T. Carmi, ha-Unikorn Mistakel ba-Mareh ("The Unicorn Looks into the Mirror")
- Ori Bernstein, be-Ona ha-Kezarah ("In the Brief Season")
- Yaoz Kast, a book of collected poems
- Ozer Rabin, Shuv ve-shuv ("Again and Again")
- A. Aldon, a book of poems
- S. Pilus, a book of poems
- S. Tanny, Ad Shehigia ha-Yom (title translated by the author as "The Moment Came")
- D. Chomsky, Ezov ba-Even ("The Moss on the Stone")

==== United States ====
- Israel Efros, collected poems, four volumes
- Eliezer D. Friedland, Shirim be-Sulam Minor ("Poems in a Minor Key")
- Avraham Marthan, Shavot ha-Sirot Im Erev ("The Birds Return at Evening")
- Yizhak Finkel, Maginah Morikah ("Verdant Melody")

=== India ===
Listed in alphabetical order by first name:

- Hem Barua, Man Mayuri; Assamese-language
- Ramakant Rath, Anek Kothari ("Many Rooms"); Oriya-language
- Rituraj, Ek Marandharma aur Anya; Hindi-language
- Sitakant Mahapatra, Astapadi ("Eight Steps"); Oriya-language
- Sugathakumari, Pathirappookkal ("Midnight Flowers"); Malayalam-language
- Umashankar Joshi, Abhijna; Gujarati-language

=== Italy ===
- Lino Curci, Gli operai della terra
- Antonio Veneziano, Ottave (posthumous)
- Carlo Vallini, Un giorno (posthumous)
- Enrico Falqui, editor, Tutte le poesie della "Voce", anthology

=== Portuguese language ===
==== Brazil ====
- José Paulo Paes, Anatomías
- Affonso Avila, Resíduos Seiscentista em Minas, a study of the barique poetry of Minas Gerais

=== Spanish language ===
==== Chile ====
- Rosamel del Valle, a book of poetry, posthumously published
- Humberto Díaz Casanueva, El sol ciego
- Gabriela Mistral, Poema de Chile ("Poem of Chile"), posthumously published

==== Spain ====
- Gastón Basquero, Memorial de un testigo (Cuban resident of Spain)
- Gabriel Celaya, Lo que faltaba: Precedido de la linterna sorda y Música de baile
- Manuel Tuñón de Lara, Antonio Machado, poeta del pueblo a critical study

=== Yiddish ===
- David Sfard, Barefoot Steps (Poland)

==== Israel ====
- Jacob Friedmann, Loving Kindness
- Rikuda Potash, a book of poems (posthumous)

==== United States ====
- Rachel Korn, a book of poems
- Avrom Zak, a book of poems
- M. M. Shafir, a book of poems
- Leon Feinberg, a book of poems
- Sholem Shtern, a book of poems
- M. Frid-Vaninger, a book of poems
- Mates Olitski, a book of poems

==== Soviet Union ====
- Leib Kvitko, a book of selected poems
- Simon Halkin, My Treasury

=== Other ===
- Luo Fu, Poems from Beyond, Chinese (Taiwan)
- Einar Skjæraasen, "Sang i september" the first poem to appear since 1956 from one of Norway's most popular poets
- Pentti Saarikoski, Laulu laululta pois ("Going Away, Song by Song"), a book-length poem (Finland)
- Alexander Mezhirov, Подкова ("Podkova"), Russia, Soviet Union
- Wisława Szymborska, Poland:
  - Sto pociech ("No End of Fun")
  - Poezje wybrane ("Selected Poetry")

== Awards and honors ==
=== Australia ===
- Grace Leven Prize for Poetry: Douglas Stewart, Collected Poems 1936–1967

=== Canada ===
- See 1967 Governor General's Awards for a complete list of winners and finalists for those awards.

=== United Kingdom ===
- Cholmondeley Award: Seamus Heaney, Brian Jones, Norman Nicholson
- Eric Gregory Award: Angus Calder, Marcus Cumberlege, David Harsent, David Selzer, Brian Patten
- Frost Medal: Marianne Moore
- Queen's Gold Medal for Poetry: Charles Causley

=== United States ===
- Bollingen Prize: Robert Penn Warren
- National Book Award for Poetry: James Merrill, Nights and Days
- Pulitzer Prize for Poetry: Anne Sexton: Live or Die
- Fellowship of the Academy of American Poets: Mark Van Doren

=== France ===
- Max Jacob Award: Édith Boissonnas, for L'Embellie
- Critics' Prize: J. Grosjean, Élégies
- Apollinaire Award: P. Gascar, Le Quatrième État de la matière

== Births ==
- January – Karen Volkman, American poet
- January 6 – Sia Figiel, Samoan novelist, poet and painter (d. 2026)
- May 5 – Saskia Hamilton, American poet
- June 9 – Malú Urriola, Chilean poet
- June 16 – Kasra Anghaee, Swiss poet
- August 22 – Valérie Rouzeau, French poet and translator
- September 21 – Suman Pokhrel, Nepali poet, lyricist, playwright, translator and artist
- October 21 – Pam Rehm, American poet
- Lisa Jarnot, American poet
- V. Penelope Pelizzon, American poet
- Joelle Taylor, English performance poet
- Diane Thiel, American poet and academic
- Matthew Zapruder, American poet and editor

== Deaths ==
Birth years link to the corresponding "[year] in poetry" article:

- January 29 – Ion Buzdugan, 79 (born 1887), Romanian poet, folklorist and politician
- February 13 – Forugh Farrokhzad (born 1934), Iranian poet and film director, in automobile accident
- March 16 – Thomas MacGreevy, 72 (born 1893), Irish poet, director of the National Gallery of Ireland and member of the first Irish Arts Council
- March 30 – Jean Toomer, 72 (born 1894), American poet, novelist and important figure of the Harlem Renaissance
- May 10 – Margaret Larkin, 67 (born 1899), American writer, poet, singer-songwriter, researcher, journalist and union activist
- May 12 – John Masefield, 88 (born 1878), English Poet Laureate and author
- May 22 – Langston Hughes, 65 (born 1902), African American poet, of heart failure
- June 7 – Dorothy Parker, 73 (born 1893), American writer and poet known for her caustic wit, of heart failure
- June 23 – Sakae Tsuboi 壺井栄 (born 1899), novelist and poet
- July 1 – Chen Xiaocui, 64 (born 1902), Chinese poet, fiction writer, translator and painter, suicide
- July 13 – Yoshino Hideo 吉野秀雄 (born 1902), Japanese, Shōwa period tanka poet
- July 19 – Odell Shepard, 82 (born 1884), American historian and poet
- July 22 – Carl Sandburg, 89 (born 1878), American historian and poet, of heart failure
- July 25 – Pierre Albert-Birot, 91 (born 1876), French poet and writer
- September (exact date not known) – Christopher Okigbo, 37 (born 1930), Nigerian poet, killed in action in Nigerian Civil War
- September 1 – Siegfried Sassoon, 80 (born 1886), English poet and memoirist
- September 5 – David C. DeJong, 62, Dutch-American poet and fiction writer
- September 8 – Katka Zupančič, 77 (born 1889), Slovene-American children's poet
- September 23 – Augusto Casimiro, 78 (born 1889), Portuguese poet, founder of the Seara Nova literary review and political commentator
- October 8 – Vernon Watkins, 61 (born 1906), Welsh poet and painter, of heart failure
- November 17 – Bo Bergman, 98 (born 1869), Swedish poet
- November 30 – Patrick Kavanagh, 63 (born 1904), Irish poet and novelist, of pneumonia
- Date not known – Randall Swingler (born 1909), English poet, librettist, publisher and flautist

== See also ==
- Poetry
- List of poetry awards
- List of years in poetry
