= 1967 in Australian literature =

This article presents a list of the historical events and publications of Australian literature during 1967.

== Major publications ==
=== Books ===
- Patricia Carlon – See Nothing, Say Nothing
- Jon Cleary – The Long Pursuit
- Kenneth Cook – Tuna
- Dymphna Cusack – The Sun is Not Enough
- Catherine Gaskin – Edge of Glass
- Thomas Keneally – Bring Larks and Heroes
- Eric Lambert – Hiroshima Reef
- Joan Lindsay – Picnic at Hanging Rock
- Tony Morphett – Dynasty
- Barry Oakley – A Wild Ass of a Man
- Katharine Susannah Prichard – Subtle Flame
- Kylie Tennant – Tell Morning This
- F. J. Thwaites – Shall Come a Time
- George Turner – The Lame Dog Man

=== Short stories ===
- Beatrice Davis – Short Stories of Australia, The Moderns (edited)
- Frank Hardy – Billy Borker Yarns Again
- Elizabeth Harrower — "The Cost of Things"
- Shirley Hazzard – People in Glass Houses
- Douglas Stewart – Short Stories of Australia - The Lawson Tradition (edited)
- Kylie Tennant – Ma Jones and the Little White Cannibals

=== Children's and Young Adult fiction ===
- Hesba Brinsmead – A Sapphire for September
- Nan Chauncy – Mathinna's People
- Mavis Thorpe Clark – Blue Above the Trees
- Eleanor Spence – The Switherby Pilgrims
- Ivan Southall
  - The Fox Hole
  - To the Wild Sky
- Randolph Stow – Midnite : The Story of a Wild Colonial Boy

=== Science fiction and fantasy ===
- A. Bertram Chandler – Nebula Alert
- Jack Wodhams – "There is a Crooked Man"

=== Poetry ===
- Bruce Dawe – "Life-Cycle"
- Geoffrey Dutton – Poems Soft and Loud
- Rodney Hall – Eyewitness : Poems
- Gwen Harwood – "In Brisbane"
- Dorothy Hewett – The Hidden Journey
- Les Murray – "An Absolutely Ordinary Rainbow"
- David Rowbotham – Bungalow and Hurricane : new poems
- Thomas Shapcott – A Taste of Salt Water : Poems
- Douglas Stewart – Collected Poems 1936–1967
- Chris Wallace-Crabbe – The Rebel General

=== Drama ===
- Dorothy Hewett – This Old Man Comes Rolling Home

=== Biography ===
- Donald Horne – The Education of Young Donald
- Lionel Lindsay – Comedy of Life : An Autobiography
- Robert Menzies – Afternoon Light : Some Memories of Men and Events
- Bill Scott – Focus on Judith Wright

== Awards and honours ==
=== Literary ===
Award	Author	Title	Publisher
ALS Gold Medal	No award		
Colin Roderick Award	Douglas Stewart	Collected Poems 1936–1967	Angus and Robertson
Miles Franklin Award	Thomas Keneally	Bring Larks and Heroes	Cassell

=== Children and Young Adult ===
Award	Category	Author	Title	Publisher
Children's Book of the Year Award	Older Readers	Mavis Thorpe Clark	The Min-Min	Lansdowne Press
Children's Book of the Year Award	Picture Book	No award		

=== Poetry ===
Award	Author	Title	Publisher
Grace Leven Prize for Poetry	Douglas Stewart	Collected Poems 1936–1967	Angus and Robertson

== Births ==
A list, ordered by date of birth (and, if the date is either unspecified or repeated, ordered alphabetically by surname) of births in 1967 of Australian literary figures, authors of written works or literature-related individuals follows, including year of death.

- 15 May – James Bradley, novelist
- 23 May – Sean Williams, novelist

Unknown date

- Melissa Lucashenko, novelist

== Deaths ==
A list, ordered by date of death (and, if the date is either unspecified or repeated, ordered alphabetically by surname) of deaths in 1967 of Australian literary figures, authors of written works or literature-related individuals follows, including year of birth.

- 21 January – Cecil Mann, journalist, poet and novelist (born 1896)
- 7 February – David Unaipon, writer (born 1872)
- 29 March – D'Arcy Niland, novelist (born 1917)
- 10 September – Vera Dwyer, novelist (born 1889)
- 25 November – Hal Gye, artist and writer (born 1887)
- 31 December – Arthur Mailey, cricketer and journalist (born 1886)

Unknown date

- Llywelyn Lucas, poet (born 1898)

== See also ==
- 1967 in Australia
- 1967 in literature
- 1967 in poetry
- List of years in Australian literature
- List of years in literature
