= Tom Brennan (barge) =

Barge

Coordinates: 28°37′49″S 138°42′30″E

MV Tom Brennan
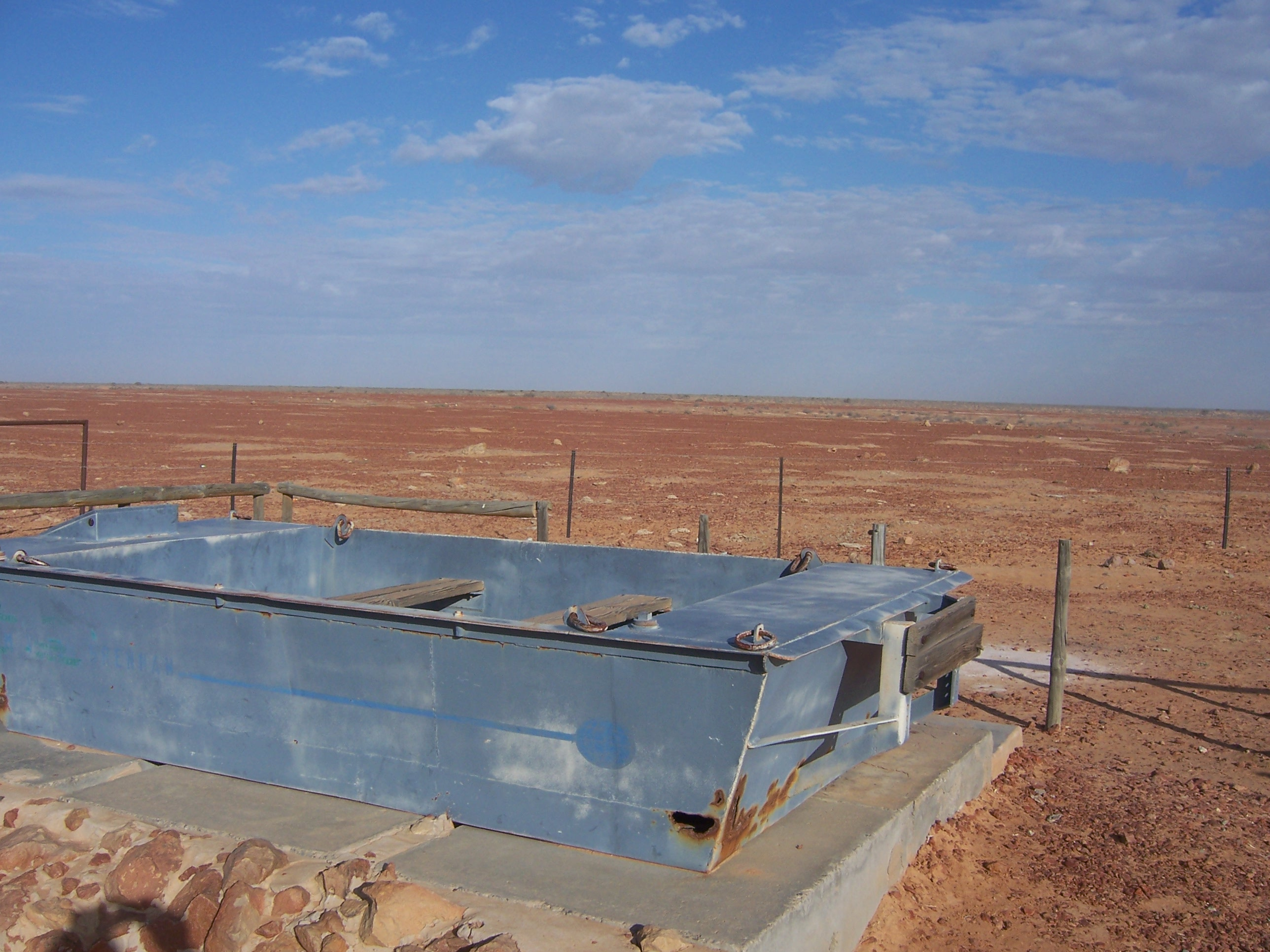
- MV Tom Brennan memorial

History
- Name: Tom Brennan
- Owner: Dalgety & Co. Ltd; Local residents, Cooper Creek; Government of South Australia
- Operator: Tom Kruse
- Ordered: 1949
- Builder: South Australian Harbors Board
- Launched: 1949
- Completed: 1949
- Maiden voyage: 1949
- In service: 1949
- Out of service: 1960 or 1963
- Fate: Withdrawn from service due to replacement by larger vessel
- Status: Established as a memorial at Etadunna in 1986

General characteristics
- Type: barge
- Length: 4.9 metres (16 ft)
- Beam: 1.8 metres (5 ft 11 in)
- Draught: 0.76 metres (2 ft 6 in)
- Propulsion: outboard motor
- Sail plan: not rigged

Tom Brennan (also known as MV Tom Brennan) was a barge built in the Australian state of South Australia in 1949 for use as a ferry at the crossing of the Birdsville Track over Cooper Creek when the creek was in flood in what is now the state’s Far North region. It was withdrawn from service in either 1960 or 1963 and since 1986, it has served as a monument. One of its operators was the mail contractor, Tom Kruse.

== Construction ==
Tom Brennan was built in early 1949 by the South Australian Harbors Board in response to a proposal by the stock agency Dalgety & Co. Ltd for a ferry to move people and goods across Cooper Creek at the Kopperamana Crossing on the Birdsville Track when creek was in flood.

It is described as being a "steel punt with airtight tanks, powered by a 4 horse power outboard motor". The vessel was named after Mr T. R. Brennan, the Livestock Manager with Dalgety & Co. Ltd, who is credited with having the idea to provide a ferry service.

== Career ==
It was finished in May 1949 and was delivered by Dalgety & Co. Ltd by rail to Marree where it was collected by Tom Kruse who was the mail contractor for the area between Marree and Birdsville. The barge was reported as being in constant use for the first three years of service; in particular, the Cooper Crossing was impassable for six months in 1949.

The barge was featured in The Back of Beyond, the 1954 documentary produced by John Heyer, being used by Tom Kruse and a passenger to move goods across a flooded creek.

In either 1960 or 1963, it was replaced with a larger vessel capable of transporting both stock and vehicles operated by either one of the following South Australian government departments - the Engineering and Water Supply Department or the Highways Department.

== Current status ==
As of 2016, Tom Brennan is located on the west side of the Birdsville Track to the south of the Cooper Creek in the gazetted locality of Etadunna within what is reported as being a camping ground.

It was restored in 1986 by the South Australian Highways Department as part of celebrations of South Australia’s 150th anniversary and was dedicated as a monument later in 1986 along with the installation of a plaque which is inscribed with the following:

M. V. Tom Brennan

This barge was presented to the settlers north of Cooper Creek by Dalgety and Company Ltd, in 1949 to ferry people, supplies and mail across flood waters and to assist drovers with the crossing of cattle on route to the Adelaide Market. Restored by the Highways Department of South Australia to commemorate the State's 150 Jubilee

Hon. G. R. Keneally, MP, Minister of Transport South Australia

Mr. N. D. O'Brien, General Manager Dalgety Bennetts Farmers

Tom Brennan has been listed as a shipwreck under the South Australian Historic Shipwrecks Act 1981.

== See also ==
- List of shipwrecks of Australia
