= Native Earth (film) =

1946 documentary by John Heyer

Native Earth is a 1946 Australian documentary film directed by John Heyer about Papua New Guinea.

== Details ==
It was narrated by Peter Finch and written by Catherine Duncan.

It was the first film from the Australian National Film Board and was released theatrically.
