= The Golden Lover =

1943 Australian verse drama

- Genre: verse drama
- Running time: 75 mins (8:00 pm – 9:15 pm)
- Country of origin: Australia
- Language: English
- Home station: 2FC
- Syndicates: ABC
- Written by: Douglas Stewart
- Directed by: Fred Clewlow
- Original release: January 24, 1943

The Golden Lover is a 1943 Australian verse drama by Douglas Stewart. It was based on an ancient Māori legend. Stewart was from New Zealand.

== Background ==
It won the ABC's Verse Drama competition. A number of plays from this competition were produced by the ABC: The Real Betrayal, by Isobel Andrews; We're Going Through, by T. Inglis Moore; It Has Happened Before, by Dorothy Blewett; Mined Gold, by Douglas Worrall Purnell; Succubus, by Catherine Duncan; The Unmapped Lands, by Elisabeth Lambert; Brief Apocalypse, by Kenneth Mackenzie; Fear, by Ruth Bedford; With Wings as Eagles, by Edmund Barclay and Joy Hollyer; Richard Bracken-Farmer, by Wolfe Fairbridge.

The play was published in a collection of Stewart's works in 1945. Reviewing this, Leslie Rees called the play:

A comedy of Māori life, faithful in its simple setting, while psychologically it is as sophisticated as a town piece by Congreve. It is the story of an ill-married girl and her dream lover, a man of the patu paiarehe, “tall as a tree,” and of her choice between drab reality and glamorous escape. Its moods vary from boisterous belly-laughter to passionate or lyric love-making. The printed text is much longer than that broadcast—perhaps too long, although the eye is less irritated by repetition than the ear. Like the other work, this one has classic quality, the verse rising from the colloquial to the enchanted, full of lovely things. Romantic in mental colouring, Stewart finds themes in historical subjects, but to their dramatic illustration he brings nostalgic overtones and understanding, lent from his own rich sense of the beauty and ardour of life, not borrowed from a literary heritage. Hence he is an original.

The play was produced by the ABC in 1943, 1948 and 1957.
