= Kevin Brennan (actor) =

Australian actor (1920–1998)

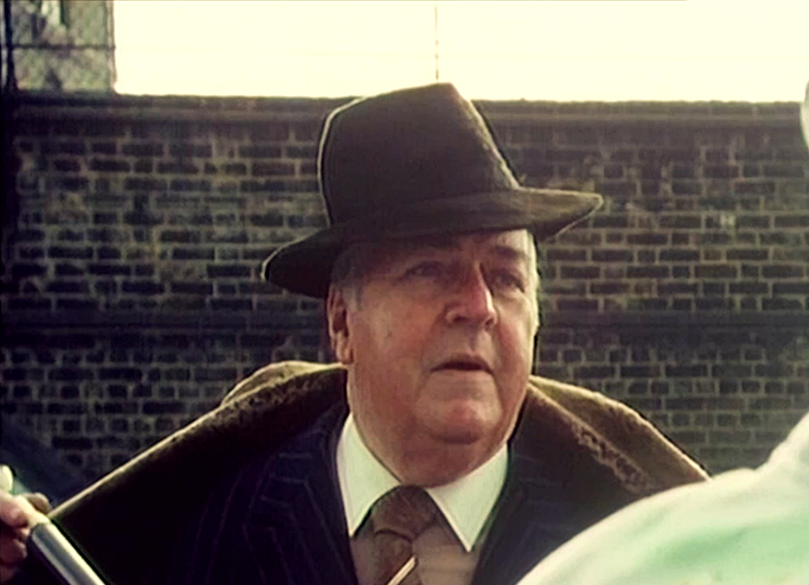
- Brennan in The Optimist, 1985
- Born: Kevin Martin Brennan; 12 September 1920; Randwick, Sydney, New South Wales
- Died: 17 December 1998 (aged 78); Banstead, Surrey
- Occupation: Actor
- Years active: 1949–1985

Kevin Martin Brennan (12 September 1920 – 17 December 1998) was an Australian-born British-based film and television actor. He appeared in the children's ITV series A Bunch of Fives in the 1970s and as Doris Luke's love interest Tom Logan in the British soap opera Crossroads in 1982.

Early in his career while still in Australia he narrated the acclaimed 1954 documentary The Back of Beyond directed by John Heyer.

== Filmography ==
| Year | Title | Role | Notes |
|---|---|---|---|
| 1949 | Eureka Stockade | Black | |
| 1959 | On the Beach | Dr. King (radiation diagnosis) | |
| 1962 | Live Now – Pay Later | Jackson | |
| 1963 | The Small World of Sammy Lee | Poker Player | |
| 1963 | The Punch and Judy Man | Landlord | |
| 1963 | The World Ten Times Over | Brian | |
| 1970 | Loot | Vicar | |
| 1970 | Cool It Carol! | | |
| 1971 | Get Carter | Harry | |
| 1972 | Mutiny on the Buses | Mr. Jenkins | |
| 1979 | Unidentified Flying Oddball | Winston | |
| 1979 | The Great Riviera Bank Robbery | Customer | |
| 1982 | Star Fleet | General Kyle | Voice |
| 1985 | The Optimist | Claude | |
