= The Lame Dog Man =

1967 novel by George Turner

- Author: George Turner
- Language: English
- Series: Treelake
- Genre: Literary fiction
- Publisher: Cassell
- Publication date: 1967
- Publication place: Australia
- Media type: Print
- Pages: 278 pp
- Preceded by: A Waste of Shame
- Followed by: Beloved Son

The Lame Dog Man (1967) is a novel by Australian author George Turner. It is the last in the author's "Treelake" series, following The Cupboard Under the Stairs and A Waste of Shame.

== Plot outline ==
The title character is Jimmy Carlyon, a young man employed as a Commonwealth employment officer. Carlyon moves among a group of psychologically disturbed people, attempting to rectify problems in others' lives while being totally unable to do anything about this own.

== Critical reception ==
Reviewing the novel in The Age Neil Jillet noted that with this novel "George Turner ends his Treelake (Wangaratta ?) trilogy, one of the more quietly impressive achievements of Australian postwar literature." He did, however, have some reservations: "if the flesh of this novel is rather weak, its bones are in first-class order. Mr. Turner knows how Australians think and act, even though he has forgotten how they speak."

In The Bulletin Nancy Keesing found the conclusion of the series "merits serious critical consideration." She went on: "Of the three books in the series which I have read, The Lame Dog Man is quite the best. Turner's always cryptic style is here fully developed. It has become an instrument on which he can play his un-merry tunes with absolute assurance...Turner always offers a large cast of people whose behaviour is sometimes capricious, but always, through his interpretation, believable."

== See also ==
- 1967 in Australian literature

== Notes ==
Dedication: "The last of the Treelake stories is for Skeet and Edna, who were there for the first one."

Epigraph: 'Far other aims his heart had learned to prize, / More skilled to raise the wretched than to rise. / His house was known to all the vagrant train; / He chid their wanderings but relieved their pain.'

'This same philosophy is a good horse in the stable, but an arrant jade on a journey.'

Oliver Goldsmith, The Deserted Village and The Good-Natured Man
