= The Path of the Eagle =

- Genre: verse drama
- Running time: 60 mins (10:00 pm – 11:00 pm)
- Country of origin: Australia
- Language: English
- Syndicates: ABC
- Written by: Catherine Duncan
- Original release: 22 April 1943

The Path of the Eagle is a 1943 Australian radio play by Catherine Duncan. It was originally written under the title Succubus. The play was a telling of the Oedipus story.

It was broadcast by the ABC as part of a series of ten verse dramas on radio. The others included The Golden Lover, The Real Betrayal, We're Going Through, It Has Happened Before, Mined Gold, The Unmapped Lands, Brief Apocalypse, Fear and Richard Bracken-Farmer.

The play was first produced in 1943. It was produced again later that year, and then in 1951.

The play was published in a collection of radio plays in 1946 called Australian Radio Plays.

Reviewing this, the Herald said the play "proves that in drama... it is not necessary for Australians to rely in terminably on the inspiration of a 'sunburnt culture.' She reverts to the ancient Greeks. The plot of her ambitious work — in verse — is based on a modern interpretation of the Oedipus theme, giving rise to some splendid passages full of rich imagery and passion, building up to a tragic climax."

According to Leslie Rees, "The author’s chief talent in this play is for finding a rhythm, exploiting a sure ear for yearning cadences. They are cadences that can catch coloured words out of past or present and out of exotic places, using them to make a richly associative emotional pattern. Sometimes this facility runs away with the writer, so that the sense of character, though it is there, emerges less vividly than the verbal texture... The play’s theme is the unreality of the ivory-tower attitude of mind, but the play itself cannot altogether escape the charge of being unreal."

== Premise ==
According to The Bulletin, "It shows a family, James and Sandra, man and wife; and Leo and Connie, their children. They shut themselves in a kind of ivory tower, away from the war, and are brought into contact with it by the visit of Brian, an air-man, and Lysle, his sister. Leo, a scholar, falls in love with Lysle, finds he can’t ignore the war. Sandra reveals herself as pathologically possessive, Connie’s husband is killed."

== Sources ==
- Australian Radio Plays Leslie Rees (editor), Sydney : Angus and Robertson, 1946 anthology radio play
