= Tom Kruse (mailman) =

Australian mail carrier (1914–2011)

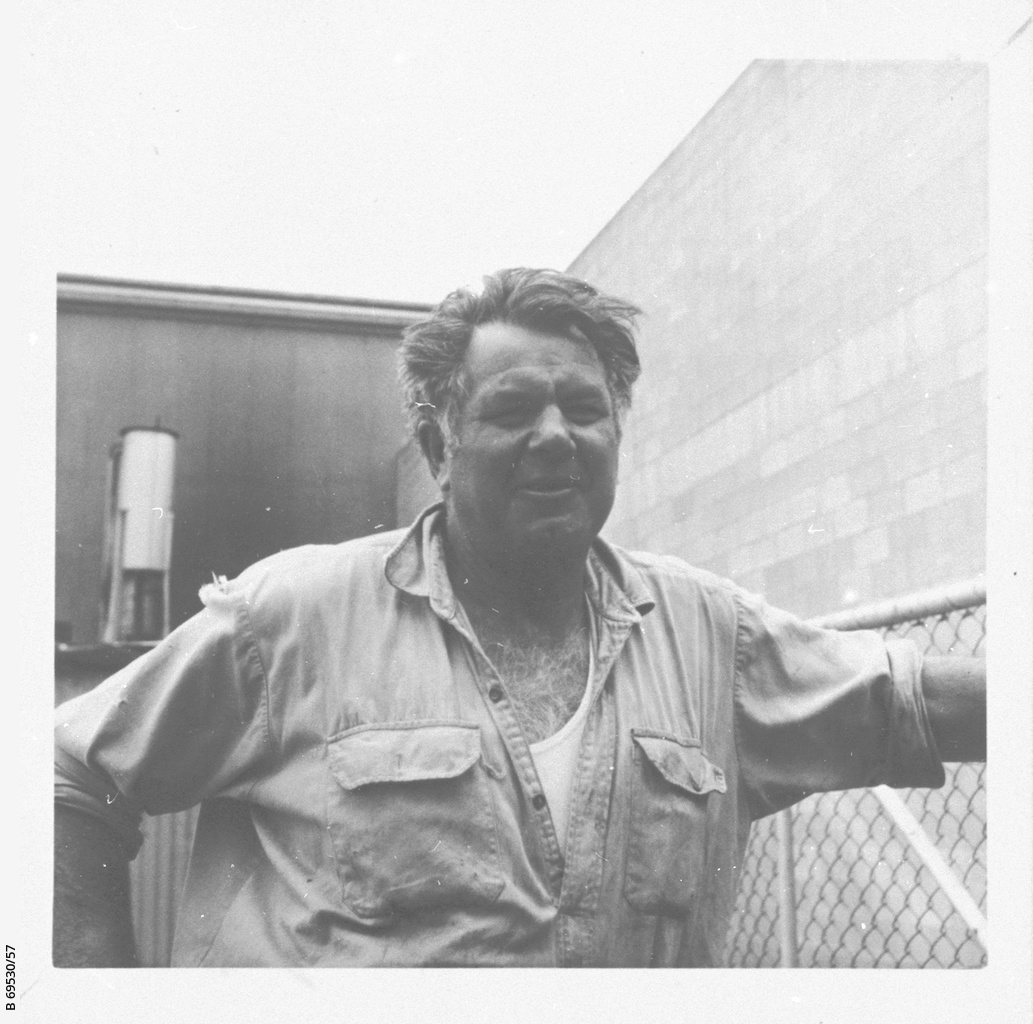
Tom Kruse standing at a gate

Esmond Gerald "Tom" Kruse MBE (28 August 1914 – 30 June 2011) was a mail carrier on the Birdsville Track in the border area between South Australia and Queensland. He became known nationally as the result of John Heyer's 1954 film The Back of Beyond. He was appointed Member of the Order of the British Empire (MBE) in the 1955 New Year Honours, "for services to the community in the outback".

== Early life ==
Kruse was born at Waterloo in South Australia to Harry (Heinrich) and Ida Kruse. He was the tenth of their twelve children. He left school when he was 14 years old, and worked as a casual labourer on local farms. However, due to the Depression, he "went 'bush'" around 1934 to work in John Penna's haulage business which ran out of Yunta in the mid-north of South Australia.

Kruse married Audrey Valma Fuller (known as Val) on 24 January 1942 in Adelaide, South Australia. They had four children: Pauline, Helen, Phillip and Jeffery.

== The Birdsville Track and The Back of Beyond ==
In 1936 Henry Edgar (Harry) Ding (1907–1976) bought the mail contract from John Penna, and Kruse began his first run on 1 January of that year. Kruse bought the mail contract in 1947. He sold the contract in 1963.

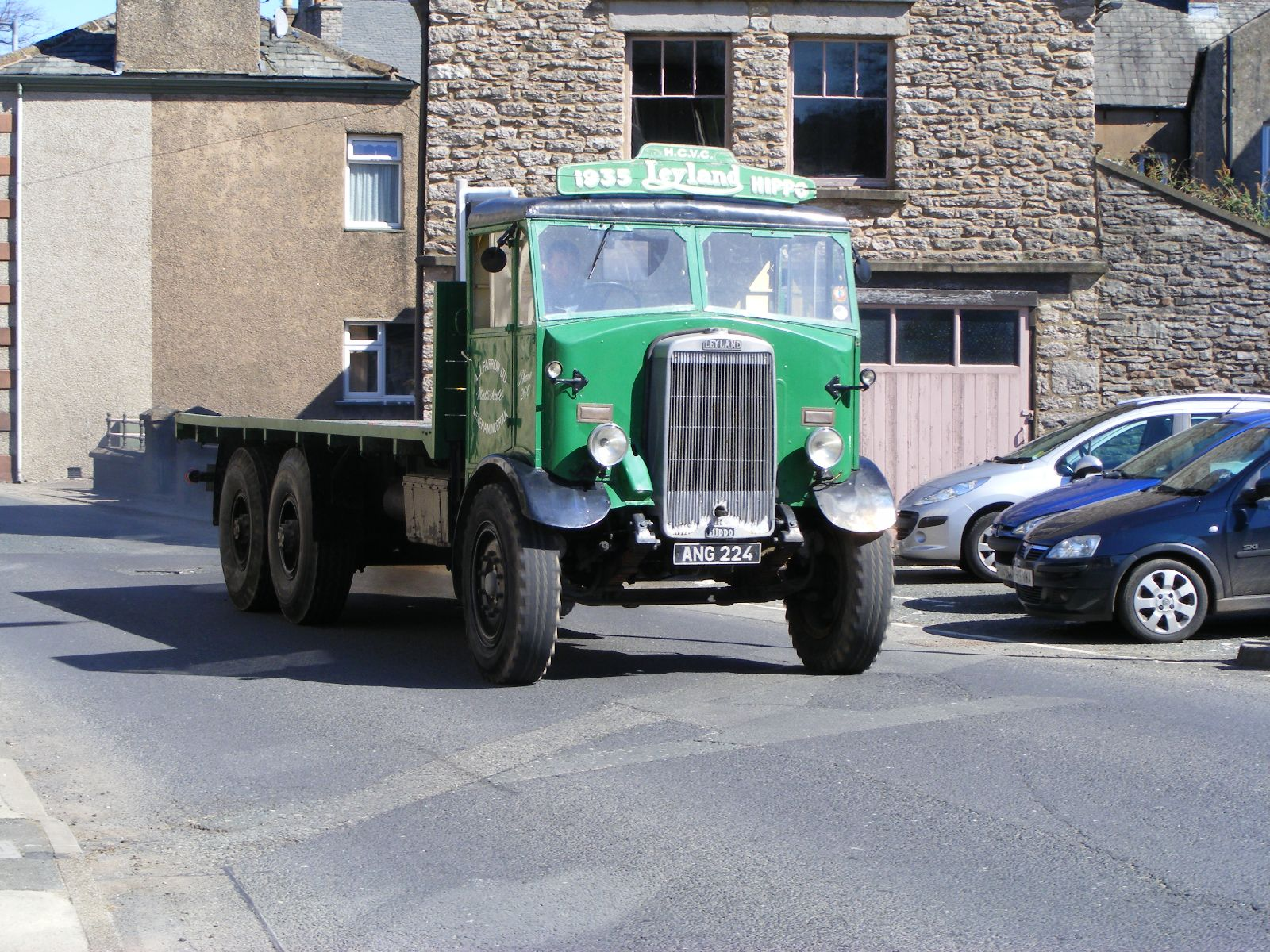
A Leyland "Badger" truck

Kruse worked the Birdsville Track mail run from 1936 to 1957, driving his Leyland Badger truck. He delivered mail and other supplies including general stores, fuel and medicine to remote stations from Marree in north-west South Australia to Birdsville in far western Queensland, some 325 miles (523 kilometres) away. Each trip would take two weeks and Kruse regularly had to manage break-downs, flooding creeks and rivers, and getting bogged in desert dunes.

Kruse came to public attention with the release of John Heyer's documentary The Back of Beyond in 1954. While the film follows a "typical" journey made by Kruse, showing the various people he met along the Track and the sorts of obstacles he faced, this particular journey was closely scripted and includes a number of re-enactments and a 'lost children' story. John Heyer had undertaken a research trip with Kruse in March 1952. Shooting on the film began in late 1952 with a crew of twelve, which included Mrs Heyer.

== The Leyland Badger ==
Kruse abandoned the truck on Pandie Pandie Station near Birdsville in 1957. It was located in the desert in 1986 during the Jubilee Mail Run re-enactment, and retrieved in 1993. A group of enthusiasts led by Neil Weidenbach, with the help of Kruse, fully restored the Badger between 1996 and 1999. The truck was gifted by Kruse and Valma to the people of Australia and is now on display in the National Motor Museum, at Birdwood in the Adelaide Hills. It is one of the featured vehicles in the National Motor Museum's installation Sunburnt Country, Icons of Australian Motoring.

== The 4x4 ==
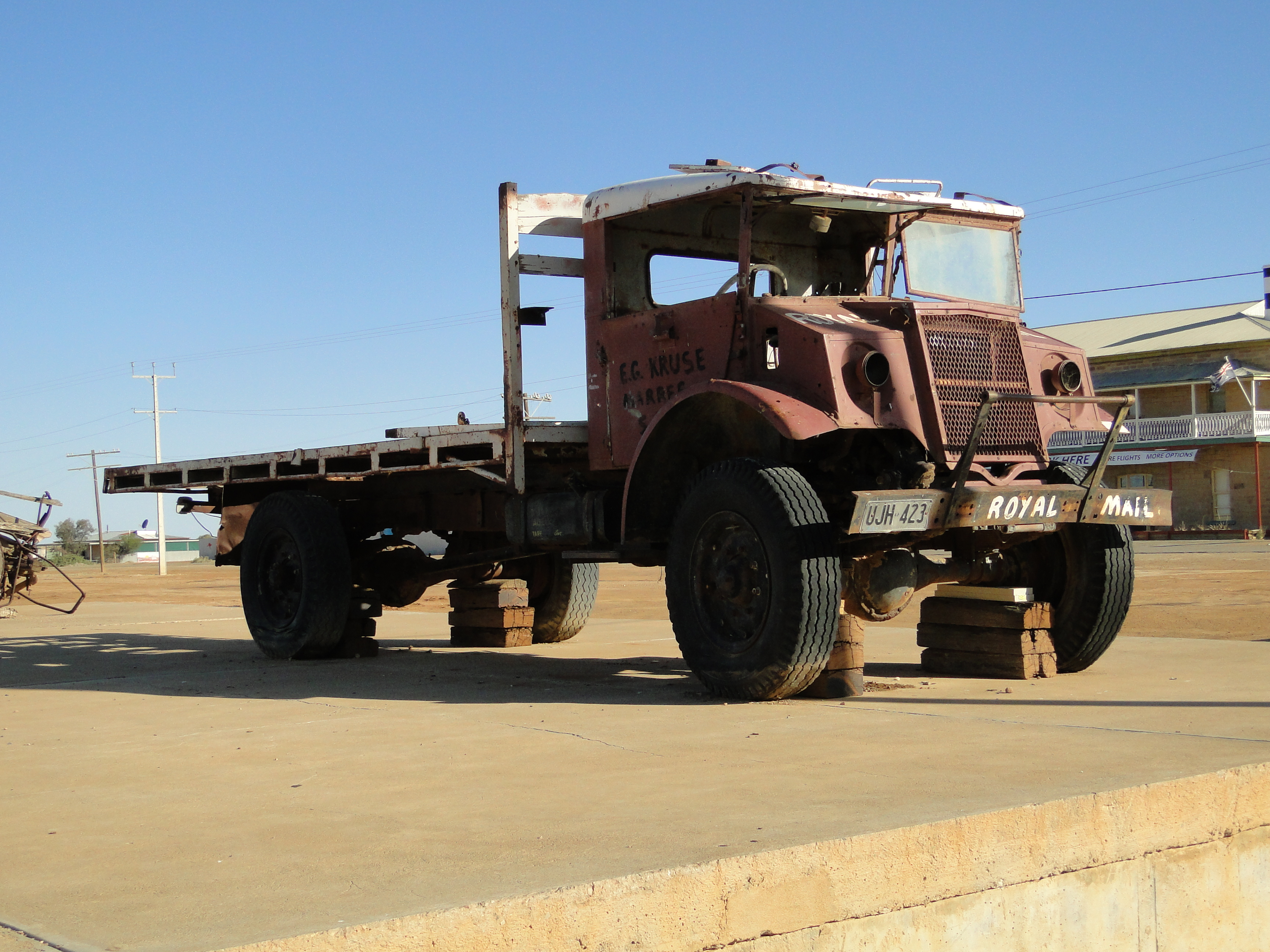
Ex-Army 4x4 used by Kruse

Kruse had a second vehicle, which also figured in The Back of Beyond, a four-wheel drive ex-Army truck similar to the 2.5 ton GS International No.I Mk III used in the Kruse-inspired film Alice to Nowhere. This vehicle has been for many years displayed out in front of the Marree Hotel.

== Later life ==
Kruse retired in 1984, and moved to Cumberland Park in Adelaide. In May 1986, South Australia's 150th Jubilee, he re-enacted his run, with 80 vehicles joining in the northbound convoy. There was a second re-enactment in 1999, and in October of that year the Leyland was trucked to a few kilometres out of Birdsville so Kruse could drive it into the township for celebrations. The next morning it was loaded with mail for "The Mail Truck's Last Run" to Marree, a fundraiser for the Royal Flying Doctor Service. This run resulted in another documentary, Last Mail from Birdsville – the Story of Tom Kruse. As well as a book about Tom's life written by Kristin Weidenbach entitled Mailman of the Birdville Track.

In 2000 Tom was inducted into the National Transport Hall of Fame in Alice Springs, and in 2003 he was officially recognised as an Outback Legend by Australian Geographic magazine. Also in 2003, Tom and his truck, the Badger, were nominated South Australian icons by the National Trust of Australia.

In 2008, bronze busts of Kruse were placed in the National Transport Hall of Fame in Alice Springs, National Motor Museum at Birdwood, at Waterloo (his birthplace), and at Birdsville and Marree.

Publicans Phil and Marilyn (Maz) Turner of the iconic Marree Hotel commissioned Ian Doyle, executive producer of 'The Tom Kruse Collection' to curate and with Mark Metzger to build the Tom Kruse Museum in the renamed Tom Kruse Room in the Marree Hotel. The collection includes hundreds of photographs, documents and memorabilia from Kruse's Marree to Birdsville mail run, including a floor board and the original grille from the 1936 'Back of Beyond' Leyland Badger and a signed and framed mailbag used in the production of The Last Mail from Birdsville - the Story of Tom Kruse in 1999.

The Tom Kruse Marree bust is now located in the Tom Kruse Room. A letter written by Australian artist Sidney Nolan to Kruse in Marree in 1954 has been added to the display. The Nolans were family friends of the Heyer family. Sidney saw an early release of The Back of Beyond in London and wrote to Kruse letting him know that he enjoyed the production. The letter also said that Sidney Nolan had included a couple of photographs and that he was intending to do some drawings and he would send them at a later date. The Kruse family are not able to locate the photos or the promised drawings. Sidney Nolan met Kruse in Marree in the late 1940s. He accompanied John Heyer on one of his docudrama research trips up the Birdsville Track. He also reconnected with Kruse in Marree when he, his wife Cynthia Nolan and daughter Jinx visited Marree as part of a lengthy Australian family odyssey which took them from Sydney to The Kimberly in the early 1950s.

Kruse died in Adelaide, aged 96, on 30 June 2011.

== See also ==
- Tom Brennan (barge)
