= The Other Side of Sundown =

1945 radio play by Catherine Duncan

The Other Side of Sundown is a 1945 Australian radio play by Catherine Duncan. The play was written to fund the Fourth Victory Loan.

It starred William Christensen, a real RAAF pilot, as RAAF pilot, and Neva Carr Glynn. Duncan and Lionel Shave directed.

== Premise ==
An Australian pilot marries a Canadian girl and brings her home.

== Reception ==
ABC Weekly said "Much of the play (and all of the closing scene) was pure propaganda; but it was good propaganda."
