= Margaret Coen =

Australian artist (1909–1993)

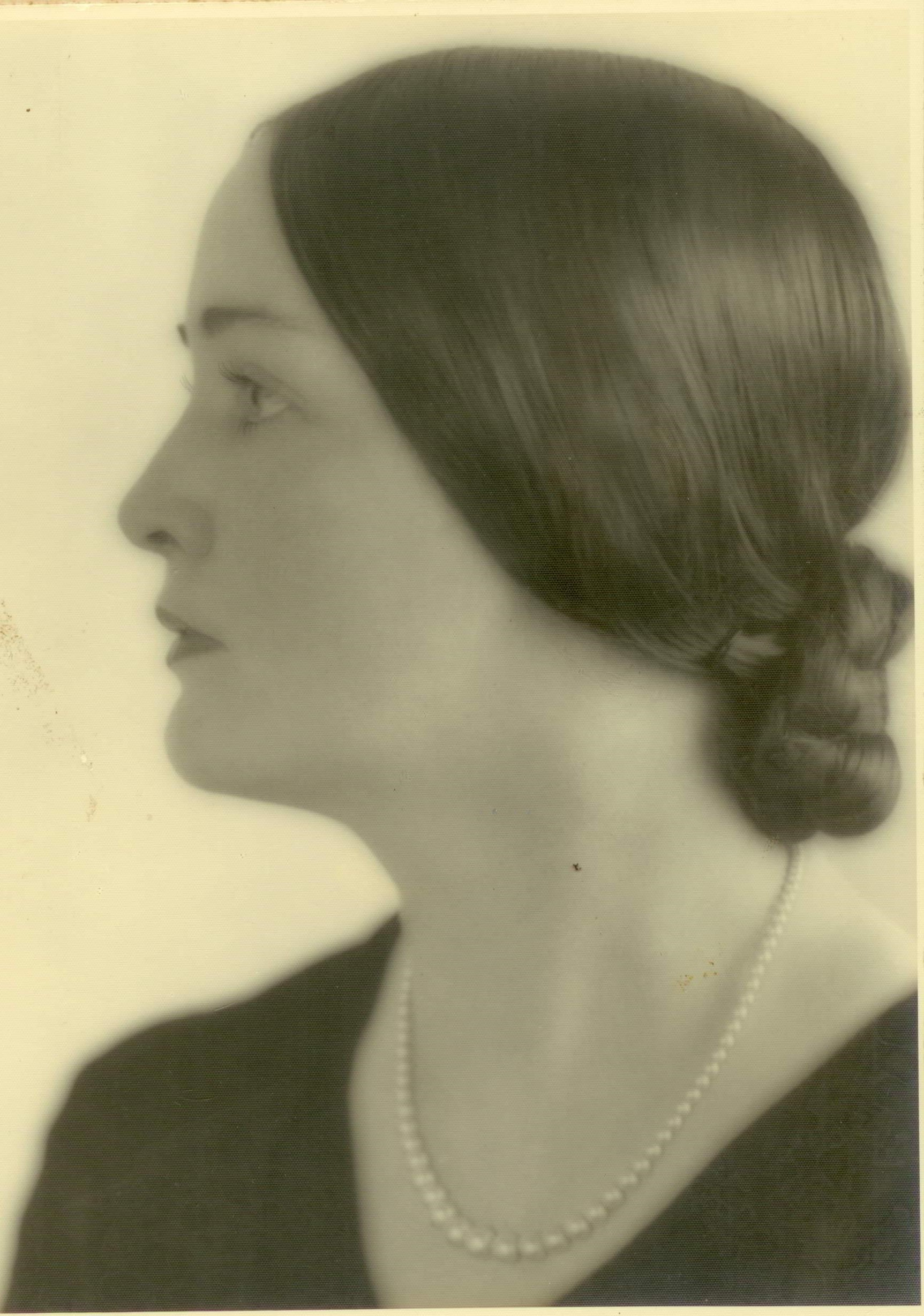
- Margaret Coen
- Born: Margaret Agnes Coen; 4 April 1909; Yass, New South Wales, Australia
- Died: 27 August 1993 (aged 84); St Ives, New South Wales
- Education: Kincoppal Convent, Australia
- Known for: Painting, drawing
- Notable work: Flower piece from Merle’s Garden (1936); Oriental harmony (1938); The glade (1943); Spring in the Bush (1957); Dry Summer (1967)
- Spouse: Douglas Stewart (m. 1945; died 1985)
- Children: 1

Margaret Coen (4 April 1909 – 27 August 1993) was an Australian artist, known for her watercolours, paintings of flowers, landscapes and still life works. Her paintings and personal papers are held in national collections.

== Early life ==
Margaret Agnes Coen was born in Yass, NSW on 4 April 1909. She attended Kincoppal Convent in Elizabeth Bay where she studied drawing with Antonio Dattilo-Rubbo.

== Career ==
After leaving school she attended Dattilo-Rubbo's city day class for women. After about a year she began studying at the Royal Art Society's night classes.

In 1930 she met artist Norman Lindsay who became her mentor and introduced her to water colours.

Coen worked as a commercial artist while continuing to attend art classes in the evenings. Her involvement with Circular Quay's artistic community led to her meeting the artist Edmund Arthur Harvey and he painted her portrait in 1932. Coen began working with watercolor and in 1934 she exhibited her work with the Australian Watercolor Institute.

In 1938 she had her first one-person exhibition at the Rubery Bennett Art Gallery. She continued painting and exhibiting until a year or so before her death.

== Works ==
Paintings by Coen are held in public collections at the National Gallery of Australia and the Art Gallery of New South Wales, S.H. Ervin Gallery Collection and a hand painted silk map is in the State Library of New South Wales collection. The largest archive of her work, including paintings originally purchased by Howard Hinton for the Armidale Teachers College, is in the New England Regional Art Museum in Armidale.

== Legacy ==
Coen's papers are in the manuscript collection at the State Library of NSW. Seventeen watercolour paintbrushes used by Coen from 1970 to 1993 are in the National Museum of Australia Collection. A smaller collection of her archive is held by the Library and Archive of the Art Gallery of New South Wales.

== Honours and awards ==
Coen was made an Honorary Life Member of the Australian Watercolor Institute. She won the Pring Prize in 1968 for Dry Summer.

== Personal life ==
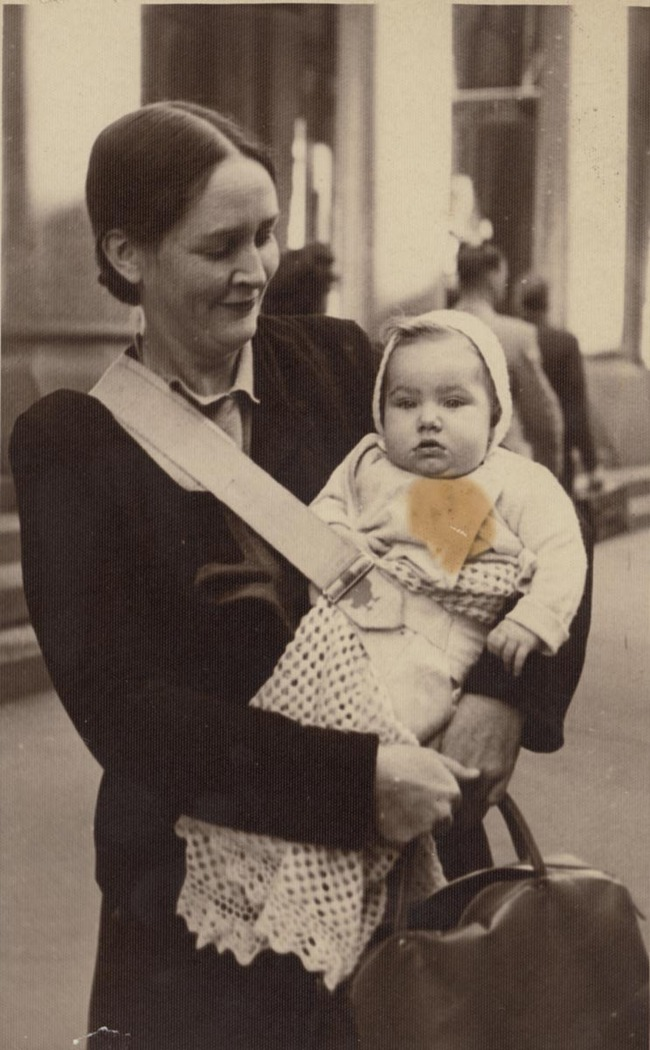
Margaret Coen holding her daughter Meg Stewart

Coen married Australian poet Douglas Stewart on 5 December 1945 at the Church of Our Lady of the Sacred Heart in Randwick. They had a daughter, Meg, who was born in 1948. Meg published a biography of her mother. Douglas Stewart mentioned Coen by name in the poem "Table Talk", part of a series of poems published in Southerly Magazine under the title "Fragments of Autobiography". Stewart also mentioned Coen's painting of magnolias in his poem "The Pictures".

Coen suffered from Parkinson's disease, and died on 27 August 1993 at St Ives.
