= The Enchanted Sailor =

1949 Australian radio verse play

The Enchanted Sailor is a 1949 Australian radio verse play by Douglas Stewart about Captain Frank Worsley and the Shackleton Expedition.

It was written as a set of ballads with prose commentary.

== Worsley Enchanted ==
Stewart also wrote a series of poems on the topic under the title Worsley Enchanted. These were published in the Bulletin in 1948 and in a 1952 collection of his poetry.

According to one reviewer, the poem, "Though vivid, it does not equal, as poetry the best in this kind in Mr. Stewart's verse dramas." Another called it "an attempt on the part of a poet to come to grips with the Antartic."

According to Clemment Semmler, with the poem Worsley Enchanted:

Stewart's ostensible aim... is to convey the strangeness of the Antarctic world as it appeared to Worsley, a plain and unsophisticated seaman. This he does, both by word pictures... his sequence of poems is, by implication, a comment on the strangeness of all human experience, the mystery of our existence. But his obsession with Antarctic exploration, in the middle period of his writing, also carried the implication that he saw in the explorer (as he did later in the scientist) the figure who deserved to be commemorated in his poetry as one who quested truth and the enlargement of the human mind.

== Premise ==
It "tells how Endurance was trapped and destroyed in pack ice on the 1914 expedition to Antarctica; of how Worsley, a blunt sea captain, was suddenly thrust into a world so strange that it seemed almost like a dream; and how, after Endurance was smashed, the crew of 32 made their way to Elephant Island, where they lived for six months."
