= The Sea and Summer =

1987 novel by Australian writer George Turner

- Author: George Turner
- Language: English
- Genre: Science fiction
- Publisher: Faber & Faber
- Publication date: 1987
- Publication place: Australia
- Media type: Print
- Pages: 318 pp.
- ISBN: 0571148468

The Sea and Summer (1987) is a novel by Australian writer George Turner. It was originally published by Faber & Faber in the UK in 1987.

The novel is also known as Drowning Towers, the title under which it was published in the US in 1987.

== Synopsis ==
Sometime in the future the Australian city of Melbourne is severely affected by climate change with the sea slowly engulfing the city. Unemployment sits at 90% and few people are rich anymore; these are known as the Sweet. The poor and unemployed, the Swill, are packed into giant high-rise tower blocks in the Western suburbs. This novel follows the lives of the Conway family, who once were Sweet but are now Swill after the father loses his job.

== Critical reception ==
Writing for his sf magazine Dreams and False Alarms critic Bruce Gillespie stated: " The Sea and Summer is not a tract. It's a fast-paced entertaining thriller of a novel. Perhaps that's the real reason why it's been ignored. Entertaining Australian novels have been rare recently. The Sea and Summer is the sort of novel you finish in a night, although it's 318 pages long, and then go looking for more of Turner's books...The Sea and Summer is a novel for people who like thinking about the future and that's why Australians won't like it. Every element in Turner's future can be seen coming into existence: the Greenhouse Effect, unexplained droughts, enormous currency problems. Even the tower blocks can be seen as symbols of the present-day ghettoization of the western suburbs of Melbourne and Sydney."

On its publication as part of the Gollancz SF Masterworks series, Graham Storrs, for the New York Journal of Books noted: "It is written in a 'literary' style—the kind that attracts awards—but it is nevertheless an intelligent and nuanced look at a possible future, where climate change has happened, where the predictions of the collapse of capitalism in 'The Limits to Growth' have come to pass, and where our hapless grandchildren struggle vainly to keep what is left of our society from degenerating into chaos. It should be chastening to us all that The Sea and Summer was first published in 1987, and we are still on the same trajectory...The Sea and Summer is almost the definition of what good science fiction is about."

== Publication history ==
After its original publication in 1987 in the UK by publisher Faber & Faber the novel was later reprinted as follows:

- Avon Books, USA, 1987, and 1996
- Arbor House, USA, 1988
- Grafton Books, UK, 1989
- Gollancz, UK, 2013

The novel was also translated into Italian in 1990.

== Awards ==
The novel won the following awards:

- Arthur C. Clarke Award, 1988
- Commonwealth Writers Prize — South-East Asia and South Pacific Region — Best Book from the Region Award, 1988

== See also ==
- 1987 in Australian literature
