= Christmas Under the Sun =

Australian documentary film

- Directed by: Catherine Duncan
- Cinematography: Frank Bagnall
- Release date: December 1947
- Running time: 18 mins
- Country: Australia
- Language: English

Christmas Under the Sun is a 1947 Australian documentary film from the Australian National Film Board. It tells the story of Christmas in Adelaide.

The movie was made to attract migrants to Australia and was filmed over six weeks in early 1947. It was not released out of fear it was an unflattering portrait of the country. However, after protests the film was released.

The film was sent to London.
