= The Back of Beyond =

1954 film by John Heyer

- Film Australia DVD cover
- Directed by: John Heyer
- Written by: John Heyer; Janet Heyer; Douglas Stewart
- Produced by: John Heyer
- Starring: Tom Kruse; William Butler; Jack the Dogger; Old Joe the Rainmaker; the Oldfields of Etadunna; Bejah Baloch; Malcolm Arkaringa; the people of the Birdsville Track
- Narrated by: Kevin Brennan
- Cinematography: Ross Wood
- Edited by: John Heyer
- Music by: Sydney John Kay
- Distributed by: Shell Film Unit
- Release date: 1954
- Running time: 66 minutes
- Country: Australia
- Language: English
- Budget: £12,000 (estimated)

The Back of Beyond (1954) is a feature-length award-winning Australian documentary film produced and directed by John Heyer for the Shell Film Unit. In terms of breadth of distribution, awards garnered, and critical response, it is Heyer's most successful film. It is also, arguably, Australia's most successful documentary: in 2006 it was included in a book titled 100 Greatest Films of Australian Cinema, with Bill Caske writing that it is "perhaps our [Australia's] national cinema's most well known best kept secret".

The aim of the film, as requested by the Shell Company, was to associate Shell with the essence of Australia, with Australianism. Heyer took as his central motif the fortnightly journey made by mailman Tom Kruse, along the remote Birdsville Track from Marree, in South Australia, to Birdsville, in southwest Queensland. In 1957, Heyer wrote that this film, when viewed with Francis Birtles' earlier In the Track of Burke and Wills (1916), "clearly suggest[s] that the true image of Australia is, and always has been, the image of Man against Nature".

The film brought Tom Kruse to public notice, and resulted in his being appointed a Member of the Order of the British Empire (MBE) on 1 January 1955.

== Synopsis ==
The film purports to follow a "typical" journey made by Tom Kruse, from Marree to Birdsville, some 325 miles away, showing the various people he met along the Track and the sorts of obstacles he faced. In fact, sometimes described as a docudrama, the film was closely scripted: it comprises a number of re-enactments and a 'lost children' story, rather than chronicling an 'actual' trip.

Nonetheless, many of the people featured in the film were real-life bush characters. They include the bushman-cum-mailman Tom Kruse; Bejah Dervish, the Baloch camel driver who "fought the desert by compass and by Koran"; William Henry Butler, Kruse's record-playing companion; Jack the Dogger who kills wild dingoes; and old Joe the Aboriginal rainmaker. Australian Screen curator, Lauren Williams, suggests that the film "can be read like a collection of travelling vignettes along the Birdsville Track, embracing the experiences of these people and the isolated 'never-never' land they occupy".

The chapters of the film, as listed by Cunningham and in the Film Australia DVD, are:

	Name	Incidents
1	Titles, Introduction	quote "where the explorers Sturt and Eyre came searching for an inland sea 12 million years too late". We are introduced to Kruse and his 1936 Leyland "Badger" 6x4 truck.
2	Marree	At the railhead, mail and other deliveries are loaded for the 325 miles (520 km) journey.
3	Travelling, the Night Bog	Boiling water shown being pumped from artesian bores. Driving through the night, the truck sinks into an unexpected boggy section.
4	Etadunna (Note: Voiced as "Etadinna", and so spelled on film text, "Ettadunna" on some maps)	HF radio, the sheep station's primary means of communication, being used as Kruse arrives. Malcolm, an Aboriginal stockman, joins as passenger and a third protagonist.
5	Cooper Crossing	A rare flooding of Cooper Creek; Kruse uses a barge with small outboard motor to ferry the cargo to a second (4x4) truck (Note: Possibly an ex-army vehicle, similar to this 3-ton truck as depicted on the DVD cover. In the DVD "extras", several such vehicles are shown to have been involved in the filming.) which is used for the rest of the journey. Kruse relays by HF radio a consultation between a Mrs MacDonald and the Flying Doctor (callsign VJC), when a direct connection was not possible.
6	Kopperamanna Mission	Ruins are shown of what had been a Lutheran mission for 500 Aboriginal people, a successful and congenial undertaking according to Malcolm, who grew up there, and fondly remembers lay missionary H. H. Vogelsang (1832–1913), whose grave is nearby. We are introduced to "Jack the Dogger" who makes a living by hunting and trapping dingoes.
7	Travelling Vignettes	"Flour and treacle, tea and tobacco" delivered to Mulka store "the loneliest store on earth" halfway to Birdsville. Mungeranie, built by Alan Crombie, Kruse's predecessor, who once delivered mail by horse and cart. Clifton Hill, the last of the five stations on the track, where there were once fifty.
8	Lost Children	Jessie, mother of Sally and Roberta, died while her husband was away. The two girls left to get help, with supplies in a billycart, lost their way and no trace was ever found.
9	Windstorm, Birdsville	A dust storm blows up on the last morning, but they must drive on. At Birdsville the sergeant of police writes up his day's log. An Aboriginal man sings a traditional invocation to rain. A nurse at the Birdsville hospital broadcasts on the HF radio the news that Kruse has arrived. The townspeople congregate at the post office while Kruse and his off-sider head to the pub.

== Production ==
The Birdsville Track

The film took 3 years to make: one year of thinking and planning, one year of production, and one year to edit and finish it. The film was scripted in advance, though changes were made during filming and production. Of the three years, only six weeks were spent shooting on location.

Heyer prepared the shooting script after undertaking a research trip with Tom Kruse, and location shooting began in late 1952. The film was edited by Heyer in Sydney at Mervyn Murphy's Supreme Sound studio.

Conditions for the location shoot were harsh – with both the terrain and the weather creating difficulties for the crew. Sand, in particular, created havoc with the equipment. Audio-tapes of the soundtrack recorded on location could not be used due to sand damage, and the whole film had to be revoiced in post-production. Lauren Williams writes that "While it was common to post-sync dialogue and sound effects in documentaries at this time, Kruse and other participants in the film expected to hear their own voices up on screen and some of them were reportedly shocked to hear another person's accent coming out of their own mouths".

== Themes ==
Lauren Williams, writes that "the film reconfirms settler anxieties about the outback as a place of isolation, brutal indifference, danger and timelessness" but at the same time presents "the characters in the landscape as survivors, people who endure, battlers with hearts of gold".

== Style ==
John Heyer and Ross Wood, his cinematographer, had both worked for the Commonwealth Film Unit prior to joining Shell. Lauren Williams argues that "Wood's accomplished visual style and Heyer's grasp of film language combine in [the film] to create some of the most iconic images of the Australian outback filmed in this period".

It is generally accepted that The Back of Beyond belongs broadly to the British Documentary movement, and is also seen as being part of a landscape documentary tradition that can be found in the works of Pare Lorentz, Robert Flaherty and Harry Watt. It is best regarded, however, for the lyrical and poetic quality it brings to these traditions. The poetic quality is enhanced by his using the poet, Douglas Stewart, on the script later in the production phase. In 1955, Stewart published a book of poems titled The Birdsville Track drawing from his work on the film's script.

While the film is highly praised and granted 'classic' status, some critics question specific aspects, most commonly the 'Lost Children' sequence. Some argue that it breaks the narrative flow, while others insist that it works well.

== Release and distribution ==
The film, released only in 16mm format, premiered in Adelaide, South Australia, on 5 May 1954, at a charity event to aid the Crippled Children's Association. Its public premiere was at the inaugural Sydney Film Festival in June 1954 and it was shown widely in Australia, including throughout the outback. Its Canberra premiere was held at the Albert Hall on 8 July. Amongst the audience of 300 were many diplomats, including those from the United States of America, Japan, China and Ceylon.

In the first year of its release in Australia, due largely to Shell's extensive distribution and exhibition network, it was seen by over 750,000 people. It was also televised extensively overseas, and represented Australia at several film festivals.

== Reception ==
The film was well received by critics and the public alike. Professor Stout, in an ABC radio broadcast on 1 May 1954, said "I believe this film will become a classic. It is poetic, imaginative and yet tough at the same time. There is humour in it, unforced and natural ... John Heyer's The Back of Beyond is a landmark in Australian documentary. It will cause a sensation in Britain".

Other reviews of the time include:

- "The final effect is a wholly convincing search for truth and much skill in presenting it ... A vividly fascinating film which sheds a forbidding light on Australian realities and darkens one's suspicions of the universe ... Documentary film has rarely been less self-conscious or more enthralling." (from The Listener, 3 June 1954)
- "A small audience sitting in a private cinema off the Strand today saw what must rank as one of the most remarkable documentaries ever made." (from The Manchester Guardian, 19 February 1954)
- "... a landscape where man is always solitary, always on the defensive against Nature; once more, the Shell film-makers revive faith in documentary." (from Dilys Powell in Sunday Times, 21 February 1954)
- "... is bound to rank as an Australian masterpiece ... the message of the film is by no means one of unrelieved horror and pessimism. There is much hopefulness in the unaffected courage and the humour it finds among the people who live along the Birdsville Track." (from The Sydney Morning Herald, 25 March 1954)
- "... is significant on account of the perfect blending of sound, words and images ... The images of the other films shown at the Festival are as static as picture postcards and certainly don't possess the suggestive powers of John Heyer's film." (from Uomini E Film, Venice, Volume 4–5 August 1954)
- "... has become acknowledged throughout the world as an outstanding documentary film." (from Charles Chauvel in Walkabout, 1959)

In addition to its being regularly discussed in academic circles and frequent retrospective screenings, evidence of its ongoing longevity as a significant film include:

- the publication in 1968, by the British Film Institute, of Eric Else's study guide
- the release of a 50th anniversary DVD collection in 2004
- the 50th anniversary screening in remote Marree in 2004 that drew a large audience
- its listing in 2006 in Hocking's 100 Greatest Films of Australian Cinema

== Awards ==
- 1954 Venice Biennale: Grand Prix Assoluto
- 1954 Edinburgh International Film Festival: Diploma
- 1955 Cape Town Film Festival: Diploma
- 1956 Montevideo Film Festival: 1st Prize
- 1956 Johannesburg Film Festival: Diploma
- 1956 Trento Film Festival: Diploma

== Related films ==
- The Outback Mailman (1986)
- Back of Beyond (1995 adaptation of Evan Green novel)
- The Postman (1996)
- Back to the Back of Beyond (1997, Robert Francis)
- Last Mail from Birdsville: The Story of Tom Kruse (1999)

== See also ==
- Tom Brennan (barge)
