= Nebula Alert =

1967 novel by A. Bertram Chandler

- First edition
- Author: A. Bertram Chandler
- Cover artist: Kelly Freas
- Language: English
- Series: Empress Irene series
- Genre: science fiction
- Publisher: Ace Books, New York
- Publication date: 1967
- Publication place: Australia
- Media type: Print
- Pages: 121 pp
- Preceded by: The Alternate Martians
- Followed by: Spartan Planet

Nebula Alert is a 1967 science fiction novel by Australian author A. Bertram Chandler. The novel forms a part of the author's "Empress Irene" series of stories and was originally released as an Ace Double (G-632), backed by The Rival Rigelians by Mack Reynolds.

== Plot outline ==
The novel features the author's minor series character the ex-Empress Irene, who has by this time abdicated her throne, and Benjamin Trafford. The husband-and-wife team crew the Imperial Yacht Wanderer and are ferrying a number of ex-slave Iralians back to their home planet. But the Wanderer runs into pirates, and they are forced to escape through the Horsehead Nebula. Space inside the nebula is strange, and they emerge into an alternate timeline where they encounter the author's major series character, John Grimes.

== Critical reception ==
Rich Horton, on SFF.net site, found the novel rather thin: "It's all pretty silly stuff -- Chandler really never seemed to care about little things like logic. That said, it's tolerable fun in its breezy way. Nothing I'd go out of my way to find, but not a story I regret reading, either."

== See also ==
- 1967 in Australian literature

== Notes ==
The novel is the third in the author's "Empress Irene" series, preceded by Empress of Outer Space (1965) and Space Mercenaries (1965).

Dedication: "To all those excellent storytellers who, as well as affording us hours of enjoyment, have provided the inspiration for the Dream Sequence."
