= Leopard-Skin =

1959 poem by Australian poet Douglas Stewart

- by Douglas Stewart
- Written: 1959
- First published in: Australian Letters
- Country: Australia
- Language: English
- Publication date: December 1959
- Lines: 14

"Leopard-Skin" (1959) is a poem by Australian poet Douglas Stewart.

It was originally published in Australian Letters in December 1944, and was subsequently reprinted in the author's single-author collections and a number of Australian poetry anthologies.

== Synopsis ==
The poet examines the self-invented adolescent who owns a number of pairs of leapoard-skin underpants which he spies drying on a backyard clothes line.

== Critical reception ==
In his commentary on the poem in 60 Classic Australian Poems Geoff Page stated that that at the basic level this poem "presents no problems. It's like a good cartoon". He goes on to note that the poem's simplicity hides the way it plays with the basic form of the sonnet, adding extra syllables as if it "does not want to fit into the cage designed for it."

== Publication history ==
After the poem's initial publication in Australian Letters it was reprinted as follows:

- Collected Poems 1936–1967 by Douglas Stewart, Angus and Robertson, 1967
- Selected Poems by Douglas Stewart, Angus and Robertson, 1973
- The New Oxford Book of Australian Verse edited by Les Murray, Oxford University Press, 1986
- The Indigo Book of Modern Australian Sonnets edited by Geoff Page, Indigo, 2003
- The Canberra Times, 18 June 2005
- 80 Great Poems from Chaucer to Now edited by Geoff Page, University of NSW Press, 2006
- 60 Classic Australian Poems edited by Geoff Page, University of NSW Press, 2009

== See also ==
- 1959 in Australian literature
- 1959 in poetry
