= The Forerunner (film) =

- Directed by: John Heyer
- Written by: John Heyer
- Produced by: Tom Nurse
- Cinematography: Ron Horner Harry Malcolm; George Heath Ross Wood
- Release date: 1957
- Running time: 34 min
- Country: Australia
- Language: English

The Forerunner is a 1957 Australian documentary directed by John Heyer. It looks at floods, droughts and the impact of the Snowy Mountains Hydro-electric Scheme. The film has three sections. After an introduction by Professor C. H. Munro from the Water Research Foundation it has a section on floods. Second comes drought and then the film shows the Snowy Mountain scheme. The film has no narration and only has dialogue from two addressees to camera. Filming began in 1955, covering many different locations.

The film won the 1958 Australian Film Institute award in the Open category and was awarded a Silver Award, the highest level awarded that year In 1959 it was picked by the British Film Academy as one of the six best documentaries of the previous year.
