= We Shall Not Lament the Dead =

1945 radio play by Catherine Duncan

We Shall Not Lament the Dead is a 1945 Australian radio play by Catherine Duncan.

The play was offered to the Federation of Commercial Broadcasting Stations for the Anzac Loan War Appeal but they rejected it for being too grim. There was division over whether the play should be performed.

The play was performed live in Melbourne in May 1945, with a cast including Duncan and Keith Eden. This was well received and the play was performed on radio station 3XY later that month.
