= To the Wild Sky =

1967 children's novel by Ivan Southall

- First edition
- Author: Ivan Southall
- Language: English
- Genre: Children's fiction
- Publisher: Angus and Robertson
- Publication date: 1967
- Publication place: Australia
- Media type: Print
- Pages: 184 pp
- Preceded by: The Foxhole
- Followed by: Sly Old Wardrobe

To the Wild Sky (1967) is a novel for children by Australian author Ivan Southall, illustrated by Jennifer Tuckwell. It won the Children's Book of the Year Award: Older Readers in 1968.

The novel is a prequel to A City Out of Sight by Ivan Southall, published in 1984.

== Plot outline ==
Six children, travelling to visit an outback station by plane, are thrown into crisis when their pilot suddenly dies mid-flight. One of the children successfully lands the plane and the children then find themselves having to survive.

== Critical reception ==
In her review of the novel in The Canberra Times Daphne Fisher stated: "This is a book that should prove to be generally popular. Mr Southall writes in accordance with Maugham's dictum that a story should have a beginning, a middle and an end; but more than this, he is to be commended for remembering that children, as well as adults, have sufficient intelligence to both comprehend and appreciate an idea which does not depend merely on the happenings in a fictional narrative."

== Notes ==
The novel was republished in 2014 by Text Publishing as part of their "Text Classics" series of Australian novels.

== See also ==
- 1967 in Australian literature
