= The Sword Sung =

1938 Australian radio play

The Sword Sung is a 1938 Australian play by Catherine Duncan. The play, a verse drama, helped launch Duncan's career.

George Patten, Aboriginal leader, appeared in a Melbourne production of the play.

== Reviews ==
The Sydney Morning herald said Duncan "obviously feels a savage resentment against the stupidities and the horrors of war; and she is not afraid to ex- press that sentiment in verse that flames. It was in neglect of the poetic element that Saturday's presentation fell short of what It easily might have been."

The Sun News said "ts characters are puppets rather than people and the -thick brush with which the villains are drawn and the heavy underlining of the moral are sometimes uncomfortably reminisceht of the old-fashioned temperance' text."

The Age called it "remarkable".

The Argus called it "a work of great promise".

== Awards and honours ==
It won first prize in the New Theatre League's new play competition.
