= Nancy Keesing =

Australian writer (1923–1993)

Nancy Florence Keesing
- Born: 7 September 1923; Sydney, New South Wales, Australia
- Died: 19 January 1993 (aged 69); Sydney, New South Wales, Australia
- Occupation: Poet

Nancy Keesing AM (7 September 1923 – 19 January 1993) was an Australian poet, writer, editor and promoter of Australian literature.

== Early life ==
Nancy Keesing was born on 7 September 1923, in Sydney, Australia, and attended school at Sydney Church of England Girls' Grammar School and the Frensham School (Mittagong). During WW2 she worked as a naval account clerk on Garden Island in Sydney Harbour. After the war she enrolled in social sciences at the University of Sydney, and then worked as a social worker at the Royal Alexandra Hospital for Children, Camperdown (1947–1951).

== Literary career ==
From about 1952, Keesing worked full-time as a writer and researcher with The Bulletin magazine. She mainly worked with Douglas Stewart, particularly to research and collect historical Australian songs and bush ballads.

Keesing was active in a number of literary associations, most notably the Australian Society of Authors. She edited the ASA journal The Australian Author from 1971 to 1974. She was chair of the Literature Board, Australia Council, 1974–1977. She was also active in the English Association and the Australian Jewish Historical Society. She became a council member of the Kuring-gai College of Advanced Education.

Keesing's literary career covered several fields, including poetry, literary criticism, editing, children's novels and biography. One of her most well known works is Shalom, a collection of Australian Jewish stories. She wrote or edited 26 volumes.

Keesing wrote two memoirs: Garden Island People, about her work on Garden Island, and Riding the Elephant, mainly about her literary career.

== Personal life ==
She married Mark Hertzberg, a chemical engineer with CSR, and they had two children. They lived next to Kylie Tennant and her family for 20 years in Hunters Hill.

== Awards and legacy ==
Keesing was made a Member of the Order of Australia (AM) in the 1979 Australian Day Honours for service to literature.

The annual Nancy Keesing Fellowship was founded by her husband in her honour. It is for research on aspects of Australian life and culture using the resources and archives of the State Library of New South Wales.

== Bibliography ==
Poetry

Year	Title	Imprint	ISBN/OCLC
1951	Imminent Summer	Lyre Bird Writers	OCLC 427556527
1955	Three Men and Sydney	Angus & Robertson	OCLC 1063169392
1968	Showground Sketchbook and Other Poems	Angus & Robertson	OCLC 902707261
1977	Hails and Farewells	Edwards & Shaw	ISBN 0855510048
1993	The Woman I Am: Poems (co-authored with Meg Stewart)	State Library of NSW Press	ISBN 0730589242

Fiction

Year	Title	Imprint	ISBN/OCLC
1963	By Gravel and Gum: A Story of a Pioneer Family	Macmillan	OCLC 220424979
1974	The Golden Dream	Collins	ISBN 0001850059
1988	Shalom, Australian Jewish Stories	Penguin Books	ISBN 9780140112269

Non-fiction

Year	Title	Imprint	ISBN/OCLC
1965	Elsie Carew: Australian Primitive Poet	Wentworth Press	OCLC 500187268
1967	Gold Fever: The Australian Goldfields 1851 to the 1890s	Angus & Robertson	OCLC 458667
1969	Douglas Stewart	Oxford University Press	OCLC 1014545877
1975	Garden Island People	Wentworth Books	ISBN 0855870923
1977	The White Chrysanthemum: Changing Images of Australian Motherhood	Angus & Robertson	ISBN 0207135177
1979	John Lang & "The forger's wife": A True Tale of Early Australia	Ferguson	ISBN 0909134197
1980	The Kelly Gang	Summit Books	ISBN 0727105159
1981	History of the Australian Gold Rushes By Those Who Were There (editor)	Angus & Robertson	ISBN 0207133549
1985	Lily on the Dustbin: Slang of Australian Women and Families	Penguin Books	ISBN 0140066349
1977	Just Look Out the Window	Penguin Books	ISBN 0140074953
1988	Riding the Elephant	Allen & Unwin	ISBN 0041500873
