= Kasra Anghaee =

Iranian poet

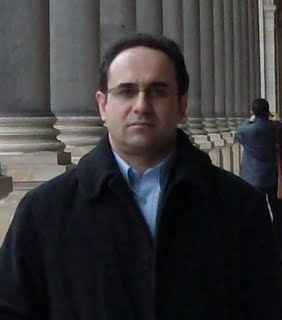
Kasra Anghaee in 2011

Kasra (Ali) Anghaee (Persian: کسری عنقایی; born June 16, 1967) is an Iranian-Swiss poet. His collection of poetry has been translated into French, English, German, Russian, Czech, Persian, Arabic, and Kurdish.

He published his first collection of poems when he was 22 years old.

Anghaee lived in many countries, thus gaining a good knowledge of the international cultures and traditions he reflected his experience in his poems and stories.

He is interested in painting and some other kinds of arts which had a great role in his artistic life.

At present, apart from writing, he translates the works of some great European and American poets into Persian.

== Publications ==
- 1- On the stairs of an old tower (Poems), 1989
- 2- Legend of gypsies (Scenario), 1989
- 3- The gate of Ivy and mist (Poems), 1991
- 4- Humidity of antique potsherds (Poems), 1993
- 5- On the track of dragonflies (Poems), 1994
- 6- My cloudy father (Story for children), 1995
- 7- Commemorating the Finale of the Century (Poems), 2000
- 8- 20 Years Selection of Iranian Love Poems (1979–1999), 2000
- 9- Statue of the mist (A selection of poems, stories, plays and scenarios), 1997
- 10- Frozen stars (Poems), 2010
- 11- The secret of the soil (Poems), 2010
- 12- Shadows of the future (Poems), 2010
- 13- To sanctify the ebony (Poems), 2010
- 14- The leaf under the snow (Poems), 2010
- 15- The soil and the silk (Poems), 2010
- 16- Autumn in the mirror (Poems), 2010
- 17- Haven of the fire (Poems), 2010
- 18- Returning from infinity (Poems), 2010
- 19- The roots of the future (Poems), 2010
- 20- The Hidden History of the Tears (Poems and Short stories), 2011
- 21- Confessions (Long poems), 2014
- 22- Scared butterflies in the mirror (Selected short stories and poems, bilingual text: English & Czech), 2015
- 23- Memories of the rain (Selected short stories and poems bilingual text: Russian & French), 2015
- 24- Before I say "Goodbye" (Selected poems), 2020

== Sources ==
Sources translated From Persian websites:

- سایت قابیل، بخش شعر
- رادیو فردا، مصاحبه با کسرا عنقایی
- گفتگوی صدای آمریکا با کسرا عنقایی، شاعر معاصر
- فراموش نكنيم كه روي شانه‌هاي شاعران پيشكسوت ايستاده‌ايم
- Radio Farda's interview with Kasra Anghaee on internet relation with poetry. (in Persian: عنقایی: اينترنت باعث شد توهم نابغه بودن از شاعران گرفته شود)
- مجموعه کتابهای كسرا عنقایی
- ستاره ی نقره - کسرا عنقایی
- تصويری از تقدير کسرا (Image)
- سودابه آفاقی: آنگاه زن ، زمین را لمس كرد. جستجوی شخصیت زن در مجموعه شعر «سرود پایان قرن»
