= Collected Poems 1936–1967 =

1967 poetry collection by Douglas Stewart

Collected Poems 1936-1967
- Author: Douglas Stewart
- Language: English
- Genre: Poetry collection
- Publisher: Angus and Robertson
- Publication date: 1967
- Publication place: Australia
- Media type: Print
- Pages: 339 pp.
- Awards: 1967 Grace Leven Prize for Poetry, winner; 1967 Colin Roderick Award, winner

Collected Poems 1936–1967 is a collection of poems by Australian writer Douglas Stewart, published by Angus and Robertson in 1967.

The collection contains 235 poems, most of which were published in a number of the poet's earlier poetry collections. The author notes in his "Acknowledgements" section of the book that some of the poems here had not previously been published in book form.

== Contents ==
THE FLOWERING PLACE (1962–1967)

- "The Flowering Place"
- "One Yard of Earth"
- "B Flat"
- "Audubon and the Pirate"
- "The Peahen : A Meditation on Natural Selection"
- "Two Englishmen"
- "Reflections at a Parking Meter"
- "Four-Letter Words"
- "Farewell to Jindabyne"
- "Flying Crooked"
- "Wasp"
- "Moreton Bays"
- "Blowaway Grass"
- "Boys Asleep on the Beach"
- "Early"
- "The Mice of Chinkapook"
- "Ants"
- "D'Albertis"
- "Mungo Park"

From RUTHERFORD (1962)

- "Professor Piccard"
- "The Silkworms"
- "Nesting Time"
- "Sarcochilus Fitzgerald"
- "Firetail Finches"
- "Smoke Haze"
- "Lyrebird"
- "Firewheel Tree"
- "Windy Night"
- "The Pictures"
- "The Dryad"
- "Kookaburras"
- "Goldfish"
- "Waterlily"
- "With a Wringer for Rosemary Dobson"
- "The Lamps"
- "At Circular Quay"
- "Leopard-Skin"
- "Fence"
- "Horse"
- "Terrigal"
- "A Country Song"
- "Three White Herons"
- "The Dry Creek"
- "The Man From Adaminaby"
- "Yarrangobilly"
- "Cunningham's Skink"
- "The Gang-Gang (Bird and Man)"
- "A Flock of Gang-Gangs (Gang-Gangs)"
- "Familiars (A Sonnet for David Campbell)"
- "The Blacktracker's Song"
- "Rata"
- "Easter Island"
- "At the Entrance"
- "Tanemahuta"
- "The Garden of Ships : A Poem"
- "Rutherford"

From THE BIRDSVILLE TRACK (1955)

- "Wombat"
- "Crow's Nest"
- "The Finches"
- "Christmas Bells"
- "Foxes"
- "Frogs"
- "Flowering Bloodwoods"
- "Crab and Cicada"
- "Brindabella"
- "Bird's-Eye"
- "The Brown Snake"
- "The Last of Snow"
- "Spider-Gums"
- "White Cockatoo"
- "Murrumbidgee"
- "The Night of the Moths"
- "Everlasting"
- "Cicada Song"
- "Blackberry Pie"
- "The Snow Gum"
- "The Fierce Country"
- "Marree"
- "The Nameless"
- "The Whipmaker"
- "Afghan"
- "The Track Begins"
- "Grasshopper"
- "World's End"
- "The Brumby"
- "The Humorists"
- "Ruins"
- "The Mules"
- "Place Names"
- "Sombrero"
- "Outlaw"
- "Lizard"
- "Blazes Well"
- "Mirage"
- "Night Camp"
- "Mungerannie Gap"
- "The Seaweeds"
- "Lutheran Mission"
- "The Dogger"
- "The Diamantina"
- "The Branding Fire"
- "The Rainmaker"
- "Birdsville"

From SUN ORCHIDS (1952)

- "Nodding Greenhood"
- "The Gully"
- "Native Inhabitant"
- "A Robin"
- "The Goldfish Pool"
- "To Lie on the Grass"
- "The Earth of the Ant"
- "Mare and Foal"
- "In the Rain"
- "Frog Chorus"
- "Oh No, Mister Thrush"
- "The Moths"
- "Country of Winter"
- "Worsley Enchanted"
- "Helmet Orchid"
- "The Devil's Coachhorse"
- "The Green Centipede"
- "The Bees"
- "Sun Orchids"
- "The Magpie (Sunshower)"
- "Flying Ants"
- "The Mopokes"
- "The Wild Violets"
- "The Fireflies"
- "Sheep Country"
- "The Aboriginal Axe"
- "The Sunflowers"
- "The Fungus"
- "Bearded Orchid"
- "Kindred"
- "Flower of Winter"
- "Tongue Orchid"
- "Mahony's Mountain"
- "Terra Australis"

From WORSLEY ENCHANTED (From Sun Orchids, 1952)

- "Worsley Enchanted"

GLENCOE (1947)

- "Glencoe : I"
- "Glencoe : II"
- "Glencoe : III"
- "Glencoe : IV"
- "Glencoe : V"
- "Glencoe : VI"
- "Glencoe : VII"
- "Glencoe : VIII"
- "Glencoe : IX"
- "Glencoe : X"
- "Glencoe : XI"
- "Glencoe : XII"
- "Glencoe : XIII"
- "Glencoe : XIV"
- "Glencoe : XV"
- "Glencoe : XVI"

From THE DOSSIER IN SPRINGTIME (1946)

- "The Cricket"
- "The Bunyip"
- "Lady Feeding the Cats"
- "The Lizards"
- "The Breaking Wave"
- "Old Iron"
- "Bill Posters"
- "Nobody"
- "The Ball and Chain"
- "The Net"
- "Black Opal"
- "The Magpie"
- "The Waingongora (The River)"
- "Child and Lion"
- "Heaven is a Busy Place"
- "Rock Carving"
- "The Dosser in Springtime"
- "The Stolen Mountain"
- "Analogies : The Dragonflies"
- "Analogies : The Unexpected"
- "The Scholars"
- "The Bishop"
- "The Sisters"

From SONNETS TO THE UNKNOWN SOLDIER (1941) and ELEGY FOR AN AIRMAN (1940)

- "The Presences"
- "The Flames"
- "A Distant Music"
- "The Grasses Bend with Frost"
- "The Mirror"
- "Heritage"
- "Dosser"
- "The Fisherman"
- "Elegy for an Airman"

From THE WHITE CRY (1939)

- "On the Crest of the Ridge"
- "To Be Cut in Stone"
- "Turn Eagle, Lark"
- "A Summer Dusk"
- "Haystack"
- "Gorse"
- "A Walk in the Wind"
- "The White Cry"
- "Look Now for Country Atlas"
- "Village"
- "Hour of Cleanness"
- "Hooves Through the Village"
- "Perceived in Chill and Windy Dusk"
- "The Young Girls"
- "Green Pond"
- "Stream and Shadows"
- "As the Moon's Hand"
- "The Mountain Spring"
- "A Song to Cross the Sea"
- "The Scarlet Dancers"
- "The White Dancers"
- "That Green, That Stone Endeavour"
- "With a Sheaf of Cream Roses"

From GREEN LIONS (1936)

- "Morning at Wellington"
- "Morning"
- "Dusk and Cicalas"
- "Rain in the City"
- "Crowd"
- "Shinbone and Moss"
- "The Girl in the 'Bus"
- "Green Lions"
- "Died in Harness"
- "Watching the Milking"
- "Winter Morning"
- "Poplar in the Mimi Valley"
- "Mending the Bridge"
- "The Growing Strangeness"
- "Hostile Mountain"
- "Black Acres"
- "The Winter-Crazed"
- "Heart of the World"
- "Two Studies"
- "The Imperishable Image"
- "Prelude and Gold in Taranaki"
- "Fragments of Autobiography : A Moment of History"
- "Moon Not Allowed"
- "Wry Time"
- "Tui"
- "Tablet for the Lonely Water"
- "Day and Night with Snow"

== Critical reception ==
Writing in The Bulletin fellow poet Vivian Smith called Stewart "a very fine poet indeed, one of the best this country has produced", and noted that "there is a special satisfaction in seeing how fully Stewart has developed over the years."

In the Sydney Morning Herald recommendations for the best books of 1967, a number or writers chose this collection. Bruce Beaver called the poems as "richly varied and inimitable as only he could make them"; Thelma Forshaw called Stewart a "poet who gives more pure pleasure than most"; H. G. Kippax noted that Stewart is "challenged only by Shaw Neilson as our finest lyric poet"; Leonie Kramer praised the "zest and directness" of the poetry; John Douglas Pringle called the poems "lyrical, humorous, precise and magical"; and Clement Semmler described the book as a "splendid collection...full of treasures."

== Awards ==
- 1967 Grace Leven Prize for Poetry, winner
- 1967 Colin Roderick Award, winner

== See also ==
- 1967 in Australian literature
