= The Cupboard Under the Stairs =

1962 Australian novel by George Turner

- First edition
- Author: George Turner
- Language: English
- Publisher: Cassell, Australia
- Publication date: 1962
- Publication place: Australia
- Media type: Print (Hardback)
- Pages: 214pp
- Preceded by: A Stranger and Afraid
- Followed by: A Waste of Shame

The Cupboard Under the Stairs is a Miles Franklin Award-winning novel by Australian author George Turner. This novel shared the award with The Well Dressed Explorer by Thea Astley.

It is the second novel in the author's "Treelake" series.

== Synopsis ==
The novel tells the story of Harry White, who attempts to rebuild his life after spending six years in a mental institution.

== Critical reception ==
A writer in The Canberra Times noted: "In this, his third novel, George Turner tells an absorbing and often frightening story, technically mature an psychologically satisfying. and his concern for the human condition is both perceptive and compasionate."

Lisa Hill on the ANZLitLovers Litblog concluded: "The evangelical tone goes into overdrive with the characterisation of Jimmy, whose stoic championing of Harry leads even to the break-up of his relationship because he won’t tolerate prejudice against mental illness. He makes a huge social and financial investment in Harry, which would be questionable in any circumstances with a near-stranger. But Turner was trying to make the point that a man ought to be able to make a fresh start without having all his attempts sabotaged by ignorance and fear. Back in the 1960s, that was an idea that had a long way to go before gaining any kind of acceptance."

== Notes ==
The novel carries the following dedication: "To Betty and Lindsay Bloomfield for one reason and another".

The author added the following note: "Kilkalla is not modelled on any existing branch of the Department of Mental Hygiene. To eliminate such confusion I have employed only generalized statements as to the detailed nature of the work carried on there, emphasizing only that it is experimental."
