= Fear (radio play) =

Fear is a 1930 Australian stage play by Ruth Bedford.

It was presented in 1940.

According to the Daily News, "It dealt with a husband and wife In a cottage on a lonely moor as a storm raged outside. The husband, possessed by fear, bears a cry coming over the moor. His wife, with whom he is much in love, seeks to comfort him. 'But through every crevice fear finds a way... ' Although this play is at times marked by quite a beautiful flow of language, it fails completely to satisfy."

According to Wireless Weekly "The poetry was the only interest. As drama, it just wasn’t."

== Radio version ==
Bedford adapted it into a radio play. This was broadcast by the ABC as part of a series of ten verse dramas on radio. The others included The Golden Lover, The Real Betrayal, We're Going Through, It Has Happened Before, Mined Gold, Succubus, The Unmapped Lands, Brief Apocalypse, and Richard Bracken-Farmer.

The play was performed by members of Sydney University Dramatic Society.
