= George Turner (writer) =

Australian writer (1916–1997)

George Reginald Turner
- Born: 8 October 1916; Melbourne, Australia
- Died: 8 June 1997 (aged 80)
- Occupations: Writer and critic
- Writing career
- Language: English
- Genre: Science fiction

George Reginald Turner (8 October 1916 – 8 June 1997) was an Australian writer and critic, best known for the science fiction novels written in the later part of his career. His first science fiction story and novel appeared in 1978, when he was in his early sixties. By this point, however, he had already achieved success as a mainstream novelist, including a Miles Franklin Award, and as a literary critic.

== Biography ==
Turner was born in Kalgoorlie, Western Australia, and educated in Melbourne. He served in the Australian Imperial Forces during the Second World War. Subsequently, he worked in a variety of fields, including as an employment officer, as a technician in the textile industry, and was a reviewer of science fiction for the Melbourne Newspaper The Age. Prior to writing science fiction, he had a well-established reputation as a mainstream literary fiction writer, his most productive period being from 1959 to 1967, during which he published five novels. Two of these were award-winning, The Cupboard Under the Stairs (1962), being awarded the Miles Franklin Award, Australia's highest literary honour, and The Lame Dog Man (1967) being awarded a Commonwealth Literary Fund fellowship.

During the 1970s, he gained considerable reputation for his reviews and criticism of science fiction, among his first critical publications in the field being in Australian Science Fiction Review, edited by John Bangsund, who at that time worked for Turner's publisher, Cassell Australia, and in SF fan magazine SF Commentary, edited by Bruce Gillespie. In 1977 he edited The View from the Edge, an anthology of tales produced by participants in a Melbourne writers' workshop, which he ran with science fiction authors Vonda McIntyre and Christopher Priest. Over a decade after his previous publication of a full-length work of fiction, he published Beloved Son (1978), his first science fiction novel. An extract from the novel had previously been published as "The Lindley Mentascripts" in Science Fiction: A Review of Speculative Literature 1 in June 1977. Before his death, he published six more science fiction novels.

== Science fiction ==
Turner's science fiction narratives contain detailed extrapolation and their invariably earnest approach to moral and social issues. In such novels as The sea and Summer/Drowning Towers and Genetic Soldier he displayed a gloomy vision of global warming's future ramifications. The former novel won an Arthur C. Clarke Award. Much of his work has a strongly "Australian" feel, and it sometimes incorporates references to the Aboriginal peoples of his country.

Turner's first science fiction novel, Beloved Son (1978), was followed by two related works, Vaneglory (1981) and Yesterday's Men (1983), comprising the Ethical Culture series. While they did not form a coherent trilogy, they were set in the same future, plagued by the problems of both a nuclear holocaust and the ravages of ill-advised experimentation with genetic food crops and epidemics caused by mutated viruses. Vaneglory introduced perhaps his most memorable creation, the Children of Time, a secret society of mutant human beings who are virtually immortal and have certain advanced mental skills. Unlike similar fictional creations however they do not control human destiny- although they intermittently dabble in human politics, their cynical and self-absorbed personalities make it difficult for them to care much about humanity or to cooperate in planning its future.

His next published novel The Sea and Summer (1987; published in the United States as Drowning Towers in 1988), was his most successful, being shortlisted for the Nebula Award and winning the Arthur C. Clarke Award in 1988. It was based on a short story "The Fittest" published in 1985 in Urban Fantasies edited by Russell Blackford and David King. A work of science fiction realism, it concerned a future historian, writing a historical novel about a near future Melbourne, beset by the problems of climate change, unemployment caused by excessive automation, the collapse of the monetary system and the division of society into elite communities segregated from impoverished masses. Turner concluded the novel with a personal reflection on the urgency of giving serious consideration to social and environmental issues highlighted by the narrative .

His next two novels were both political thrillers set in the near future. Brainchild (1991) and The Destiny Makers (1993). Brainchild focused on a journalist commissioned to investigate a genetic experiment that had led to varieties of humans beings with superior intelligence. Part of the novel was formed from the short story "On the Nursery Floor" (1985).

Genetic Soldier (1994) shared the timeline of The Destiny Makers. Subsequent to the events of that novel, the crew of a starship sent to explore for habitable planets, return to find themselves at odds with the inhabitants of the Earth, who have evolved in a more ecologically harmonious direction in their absence, and ostracise them for their incompatibility with a society determined by rigid genetic specialisation. The novel drew some inspiration from Turner's short story "Shut The Door When You Go Out" which dealt with a similar scenario .

George Turner was named as a Guest of Honor for Aussiecon Three, the 1999 World Science Fiction Convention held in Melbourne, but died before the event. In 2013 his The Sea and Summer became the first Australian novel to be included in Gollancz's SF Masterworks list.

== Bibliography ==
=== Novels and collections ===
- Young Man of Talent (US edition entitled: Scobie). London: Cassell. 1959.
- A Stranger and Afraid. London: Cassell. 1961.
- The Cupboard Under the Stairs. London: Cassell. 1962.
- A Waste of Shame. Melbourne: Cassell Australia. 1965.
- The Lame Dog Man. Melbourne: Cassell Australia. 1967.
- Beloved Son. London: Faber. 1978. ISBN 0-571-11152-1.
- Transit of Cassidy. West Melbourne: Thomas Nelson (Australia). 1978. ISBN 0-17-005276-1.
- Vaneglory. London: Faber. 1981. ISBN 0-571-11664-7.
- Yesterday's Men. London: Faber. 1983. ISBN 0-571-11857-7.
- The Sea and Summer (published in the USA as Drowning Towers in 1988). London: Faber. 1987. ISBN 0-571-14846-8.
- Brain Child. New York: Morrow. 1991. ISBN 0-688-10595-5.
- The Destiny Makers. New York: Morrow. 1992. ISBN 0-688-12187-X.
- Genetic Soldier. New York: William Morrow. 1994. ISBN 0-688-13418-1.
- Down There in Darkness. New York: TOR. 1999. ISBN 0-312-86829-4.

=== Anthology ===
- Turner, George, ed. (1977). The View from the Edge. Melbourne: Norstrilia. ISBN 0-909106-02-9.

=== Autobiography ===
- In the Heart or in the Head: An Essay in Time Travel. Norstrilia Press. 1984. ISBN 0-909106-14-2.

=== Short fiction ===
- A Pursuit of Miracles: Eight Stories. North Adelaide: Aphelion Publications. 1990. ISBN 1-875346-00-7.
- Dann, Jack; Webb, Janeen, eds. (1998). "And Now Doth Time Waste Me". Dreaming Down-Under. ISBN 0-7322-5917-7.

== Awards ==
- Miles Franklin Award for The Cupboard Under the Stairs, 1962 (joint winner)
- Australian Science Fiction Achievement Award for Beloved Son, 1979
- Arthur C Clarke Award for The Sea and Summer, 1988
- Commonwealth Writers' Prize South-East Asia and South Pacific Region, Best Book Award, for The Sea and Summer, 1988
- Australian Science Fiction Achievement Award for The Destiny Makers, 1994

== Sources ==
- Blackford, Russell; Van Ikin and Sean McMullen (1999). Strange Constellations: A History of Australian Science Fiction. Westport, Connecticut; London: Greenwood Press. ISBN 0-313-25112-6.
- Collins, Paul; Steven Paulsen & Sean McMullen (1998). The MUP Encyclopaedia of Australian Science Fiction and Fantasy. Melbourne: Melbourne University Press. ISBN 0-522-84771-4.
- Milner, Andrew (2014). 'The Sea and Eternal Summer: An Australian Apocalypse'. In Canavan, Gerry and Kim Stanley Robinson (eds) Green Planets: Ecology and Science Fiction. Middletown, Connecticut: Wesleyan University Press, pp. 115–126.
