= Sholem Shtern =

Canadian Yiddish poet and novelist

- Born: c. 1907
- Died: August 1990
- Resting place: Baron de Hirsch Cemetery, Montreal
- Writing career
- Language: Yiddish

Sholem Shtern (Yiddish: שלום שטערן; c. 1907 – August 1990) was a Canadian Yiddish poet, novelist, and critic, best known for his novels in verse depicting the life of Jewish immigrants in Canada.

Shtern was born in 1906 or 1907 in Tishevitz, Poland, and immigrated to Canada in 1927. He was a member of a prominent Yiddish literary family in Montreal, and became associated with the radical movement. His collections of poetry include Noentkeyt (Toronto, 1929) and Inderfri (Montreal, 1945), and his novels include such works as In Kanade (Montreal, 1960–63), a two-volume novel in Yiddish verse.
