= Bryn Griffiths (writer) =

Welsh poet (1933–2025)

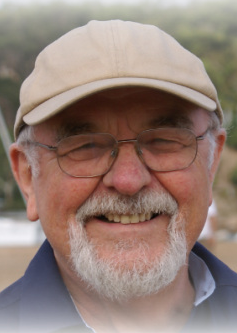
- Born: 7 February 1933; Swansea, Wales
- Died: 25 February 2025 (aged 92); Perth, Western Australia, Australia
- Occupations: Poet, writer

Brynlyn David Griffiths (1933 – 25 February 2025) was a Welsh poet and writer who worked in the United Kingdom and Australia. His poems were often concerned with the ocean and the history of Wales.

== Background ==
Brynlyn David Griffiths was born in 1933 in Swansea, South Wales. but he lived much of his early life in the coastal countryside of West Wales before returning to St Thomas, near the Swansea waterfront.

He went to sea at 17, "shipping out" as a merchant seaman for ten years from the Port of Swansea. Afterwards he studied at Coleg Harlech in North Wales, before making a career in London as journalist, broadcaster and television scriptwriter.

After resettling in Australia, Griffiths died in Perth, Western Australia, on 25 February 2025, at the age of 92.

== Writing career ==
Griffiths spent some years in London during the 1960s, working as a journalist, broadcaster, and television scriptwriter. Along with many other Welsh writers and poets, including Dedwydd Jones, John Tripp, Robert Morgan, Sally Roberts, he co-founded the Welsh Writers' Guild there.

Throughout the 1970s Griffiths gave poetry readings and lectures in the United Kingdom, North America, and Australia. He founded the first "Arts and Working Life" project for workers in Western Australia, funded jointly by the Australia Council for the Arts and the Australian Council of Trade Unions.

In 1985 he was appointed writer-in-residence to the Australian Merchant Navy. He returned to working as a mariner before returning to South Wales, remaining a life member of the Maritime Union of Australia. He spent a year as writer in residence at Swansea College of Further Education in the 1990s.

His poems are often concerned with the ocean and the history and landscapes of Wales, particularly the lower Swansea Valley, devastated by the Industrial Revolution, as exemplified in his first collection of verse, The Mask of Pity.

== Donations ==
Bryn donated a store of his letters and other papers to Swansea University for researchers studying modern Wales, especially its English-language literature. The papers include correspondence with eminent figures in the cultural and political life of post-war Wales. The collection shines a light on Wales in the 1960s and 1970s, an important period in literature and politics, with the renaissance of Anglo-Welsh literature and the emergence of Welsh nationalism as a political force.

== Awards ==
Griffiths received the Australia Council's Community Cultural Development Board's 2004 Ros Bower Memorial Award for his career commitment to the principle of giving all Australians the right to access the arts.

== Publications ==
A partial listing of Griffiths' publications:

=== Poetry collections ===
- The Mask of Pity (Christopher Davies, Wales, 1966)
- The Stones Remember (JM Dent & Sons, London, 1967)
- Scars (JM Dent & Sons, London 1969)
- At the Airport (The Sceptre Press (Outposts), Farnham, 1970)
- The Survivors (JM Dent & Sons London, 1971)
- Starboard Green (Imble Publications, London, 1972)
- Beasthoods (The Turret Press, London, 1973)
- The Dark Convoys (Aquila Press, Solihull, 1974)
- Love Poems (Artlook Press, Perth, Australia, 1980)
- Sea Poems (Veritas Press, Perth, Australia, 1988)
- The Ocean’s Edge (The Dragon Press, Swansea, Wales, 1992)
- The Landsker (Alun Books, Port Talbot, Wales, 1994)

=== Poetry in anthologies ===
- Anglo-Welsh Verse (The London Welshman (anthology editor), 1964)
- Commonwealth Poets (Heinemann, London/Cardiff, 1965)
- Welsh Voices (Dent, London, 1967 (Editor))
- The Lilting House (Dent/Davies, London&Wales, 1969)
- Anglo-Welsh Poetry (Transatlantic Review (ed. BS Johnson), London/New York, Spring-Summer issue, 1972)
- Australian Voices (Penguin Australia, 1975)
- Blodeugerdd (Harlech Anthology, Coleg Harlech, 1976)
- Seven Poets (Artlook/Shell, Perth, Australia, 1977)
- Ghosts (Thomas Nelson (Australia), 1978)
- The Moving Skull (Hodder&Stoughton (Australia), Sydney, 1981)
- Out of This World (Heinemann, London, 1885)
- Poetry in Motion (Poetry in Motion Books (with Glen Phillips, Shane McCauley and Alan Alexander), Perth, 1986)
- Axed between the Ears (Heinemann, London, 1987)
- Margins (Fremantle Press, Fremantle, Australia, 1988)
- Celebrations (University on Western Australia Press, Perth, 1988)
- Wordhord (Fremantle Press, Fremantle, 1989)
- A Swansea Anthology (Seren)
- 20th century Anglo-Welsh Poetry (Seren)
- Poetry 1900–2000 (Library of Wales)

=== Plays ===
- The Sailor, a play for radio commissioned by BBC Third Programme in 1965
- The Undertaker, a play for radio commissioned by BBC (London) in 1967
- The Dream of Arthur, a play for radio commissioned by BBC Wales in 1970
- Cambrian Carnival, a series of short plays and sketches written for the Cambrian Theatre Company whilst resident dramatist during 1972.
- King Arthur's Egg, a play for children written whilst resident writer/dramatist with the C.A.T.S. association of Western Australia in 1975.

=== Radio Broadcasts ===
- Broadcast readings of poetry on radio for the BBC Third Programme and BBC Wales on numerous occasions during the 1960s, including a reading from first poetry collection, The Mask of Pity, with actors Kenneth Griffith and Norman Wynn reciting selected works and the author providing linking narrative.
- Three one-hour radio broadcasts of poetry, with additional narration, for the Australian Broadcasting Commission (ABC) from Melbourne in 1968.
- Radio broadcasts of poetry on ABC Radio from Perth, Western Australia, during the 1970s.

=== Television broadcasts ===
- Elegy for Aberfan, a poem commissioned by TWW and read by the author on TWW and ITN networks on the first anniversary of the Aberfan disaster in October 1967.
- Elegy for Aberfan, broadcast on national television in Australia by the author during his lecture/recital tour of the country in 1968.
- Elegy for Aberfan, broadcast by BBCTV Wales in the programme In Memory of Aberfan on the 10th anniversary of the disaster.

=== Recordings ===
- First recording of The Stones Remember (Argo/Decca PLP 1189) with poet Bryan Walters in 1973.

=== Journalism for publications and broadcasters ===
- The London Welshman
- The Western Mail
- Welsh Outlook
- Wales Tourist Guide
- London Evening Standard
- Central Office of Information (C.O.I.)
- Transatlantic Review
- Town Magazine
- Tribune
- The Sunday Times (UK)
- BBC Cymru (Wales)
- BBC London
- Redifusion TV
- Thames TV
- ABC (Australia)
- WA Education Film Unit
- Melbourne Herald
