= Beatrice Deloitte Davis =

Australian editor

Beatrice Davis

Beatrice Deloitte Davis AM, MBE (28 January 1909 – 24 May 1992) was Australia's first full-time book editor, appointed by Angus & Robertson in 1937. She nurtured a generation of writers and "helped shape Australian literature for half a century".

== Life ==
She was born in Bendigo, Victoria and educated at North Sydney Girls High School, the Conservatorium of Music and the University of Sydney, receiving a Bachelor of Arts majoring in English and French in 1929. A position as secretary and editorial assistant to the editor of the weekly Australian Medical Journal became her training ground and entrance to editing. While working at the journal she also became a respected freelance editor and in 1937 Angus & Robertson appointed her as their first full-time book editor, dealing with both fiction and non-fiction. She remained with Angus & Robertson until 1974. Her position has been described as not purely editorial but that of de facto literary publisher. During her long period as editor Angus & Robertson expanded their publishing of serious Australian literature.

In addition to editing and encouraging individual writers, including writers for children, she also initiated, with writer Douglas Stewart, Angus & Robertson's annual anthologies Australian poetry and Coast to Coast (short stories) and suggested their purchase of the literary magazine Southerly. She was one of the judges for the Miles Franklin Award from its inauguration in 1957 to shortly before her death in 1992.

In 1974 she left Angus & Robertson and went to work for Thomas Nelson, with an arrangement to work from home. She also worked for them as a consultant editor after retiring from full-time work.

She married Dr Frederick Bridges in 1937, superintendent of Royal Prince Alfred Hospital, Sydney, and was widowed in 1945 when her husband died of tuberculosis.

== Awards ==
- Member of the Order of the British Empire (MBE; 1967)
- National Book Council Bookman's Award 1976
- Member of the Order of Australia (AM; 1981)
- Honorary doctor of letters, Sydney University, 1992
