= Douglas Stewart (poet) =

Australian poet (1913–1985)

Douglas Stewart AO OBE
- Born: 6 May 1913; Eltham, New Zealand
- Died: 14 February 1985 (aged 71); Sydney, New South Wales, Australia
- Resting place: Frenchs Forest Cemetery
- Occupations: Poet and literary editor
- Known for: Poetry, Verse Plays, Literary criticism
- Spouse: Margaret Coen (m. 1945)
- Children: 1

Douglas Stewart AO OBE (6 May 1913 – 14 February 1985) was a major twentieth century Australian poet, as well as short story writer, essayist and literary editor. He published 13 collections of poetry, 5 verse plays, including the well-known Fire on the Snow, many short stories and critical essays, and biographies of Norman Lindsay and Kenneth Slessor. He also edited several poetry anthologies.

His greatest contribution to Australian literature came from his 20 years as literary editor of The Bulletin, his 10 years as a publishing editor with Angus & Robertson, and his lifetime support of Australian writers.

== Life ==
Douglas Stewart was born in Eltham, Taranaki Province, New Zealand, to an Australian-born lawyer father. He attended primary school in his home town, and a high school thirty miles away, before studying at the University of Wellington. He began studying law there, but soon changed courses to major in writing and journalism.

Stewart lived in Australia in 1933 for a short time, working as a free-lance journalist. He then returned to New Zealand where he continued to work as a journalist, becoming editor of the Stratford Evening Post. In 1937, he traveled to England, where he was employed as a pantry man on the "Doric Star." Once in England, however, he was unable to find work as a journalist, and so he worked for a short time as a barman at the "Churchill Arms" in Knightsbridge. He also met writers Edmund Blunden and John Cowper Powys He returned to Australia in 1938 and took up a position with The Bulletin.

He attempted to enlist in the A.I.F. near the beginning of the war, but was rejected on medical grounds and so volunteered to serve as an air raid warden instead.

He married the painter Margaret Coen in 1945, and they had a daughter, Meg. They lived in a flat in the city of Sydney until 1953 when they moved to St. Ives in the northern suburbs. It was still rural countryside then, close to the natural beauty of Ku-ring-gai Chase. That year he won a UNESCO traveling scholarship to Europe and so the family of three spent eight months on the continent in 1954.

Stewart and Coen maintained close friendships with several contemporary artists and literati including Norman Lindsay, Kenneth Slessor, Nancy Keesing, David Campbell, Rosemary Dobson, her publisher husband Alec Bolton, and publisher Beatrice Davis.

In addition to his literary pursuits, Stewart was a keen fisherman and often went trout fishing with his friend, the poet David Campbell.

He died in 1985, and was buried at Frenchs Forest Cemetery.

== Literary career ==
Stewart wrote his first poetry at fourteen years of age, while he still lived in New Zealand. He began initially because of the need to produce a poem for his school magazine, but his love for reading and writing poetry developed rapidly. He read widely, including Shakespeare, Wordsworth, Milton and Coleridge, enjoying their ability to compact powerful description into language, and to convey emotion through sound, rhythm and word selection. As he read he worked on his own writing. His father was a subscriber to The Bulletin from Australia and the young Stewart regularly sent poems to that magazine, the vast majority of which were rejected. However, he had the thrill of seeing some of his poems published in a companion magazine, The Australian Women's Mirror, as well as newspapers and magazines in New Zealand. This encouraged him to continue.

After his university studies, Stewart worked as a journalist in New Zealand in the early 1930s. In 1936, he published his first volume of poems, Green Lions, before moving permanently to Australia in 1938 to become Assistant Literary Editor of The Bulletin. Two years later he was appointed Literary Editor of its "Red Page", and he retained this position for the next twenty years. He left in 1961, after a change in ownership, and joined the Australian publisher, Angus & Robertson, where he worked until 1972. He was also a member of the advisory board of the Commonwealth Literary Fund from 1955–70.

The years working for The Bulletin were highly productive, both in terms of personal output and for his contribution to Australia's literary life. Goodwin writes that he "had a profound influence on the publishing of Australian poetry in the 1940s and early 1950s". Goodwin goes on to write that "More eclectic than he is often given credit for, he did have a distaste for rhetoric and declamation and a preference for the Audenesque air of jaunty reasonableness" and that "he was sceptical about large religious affirmation". The Bulletin, along with Meanjin and Southerly were significant magazines for promoting the poetic achievement of writers and for establishing a cultural milieu in which younger poets could refine their skills. During his editorship The Bulletin published such poets as Judith Wright, Francis Webb, David Campbell, Rosemary Dobson, Chris Wallace-Crabbe, Randolph Stow and Vivian Smith. While working with The Bulletin, Stewart published six volumes of his own poems, co-edited two books of Australian poetry, and produced a number of verse-plays and a volume of short stories. He also contributed to the script for the award-winning Australian documentary, The Back of Beyond (1954).

Stewart, like Campbell, Wright and many poets of his time, drew much of his inspiration from nature, and is best known for his "meditative nature poems". His last book was a diary about the garden at his home in St. Ives.

=== The Fire on the Snow and other verse plays ===
As well as writing poetry, Stewart also made a significant contribution in the area of radio and verse drama. The Fire on the Snow, his verse play dramatising Scott's tragic Antarctic journey, was written at night, sometimes all night, while he worked for The Bulletin magazine. It was performed on ABC radio in 1941 to great success, and started a new interest in writing verse plays. It was broadcast on the BBC in England, and was translated into Icelandic and German.

In the same year he completed his next verse play, Ned Kelly, which won an open ABC competition in 1941, and in 1942 he won again with The Golden Lover, which was a romantic comedy, a change from the previous two heroic tragedies. Ned Kelly, written for theatre, was first performed on radio in 1942. However, in 1943 it was performed in the theatre by the Sydney University Dramatic Society, and later that year was also performed in Melbourne.

=== Correspondence with David Campbell ===
David Campbell's first poem, Harry Pearce, was published in The Bulletin in 1942, but he and Stewart did not meet until the last year of the war. The two poets maintained a correspondence over a long period, from 1946–1979. The main subject of their correspondence was poetry, though they also covered "fellow authors, fishing, nature and the land". They discussed fellow Australian writers such as Judith Wright, R. D. Fitzgerald and Francis Webb; past writers such as Shakespeare, Wordsworth and W. B. Yeats; and also contemporary British and American writers such as Dylan Thomas, whom they both praised and criticised, and T. S. Eliot, whose later plays they did not like. In other words, their correspondence conveys their "exploration and understanding of poetry", particularly on the part of Stewart, who was "one of Australia's finest critics".

== Themes and style ==
Much of his writing took nature and the natural world as its subject matter. Sometimes, such as in his work of the 1950s, he focused "intensely on the natural world, choosing small creatures and details close to the earth to exemplify larger themes." Examples are "Frogs" from his 1952 Sun Orchids, and "The Fungus". Other works, though, "are more simply impressionistic imagery, and less thematically burdened". An example is "Brindabella" from his Collected Poems 1936–1967. Although nature was his main subject, he, like David Campbell and Vance Palmer, "did not write polemics about conservation. This became the concern of their immediate successors – Judith Wright, Mark O'Connor and John Blight".

== Awards ==
He received a number of awards in recognition of his achievements, including:

- 1960: Officer of the Order of the British Empire (OBE)
- 1967: Sydney Myer Award for the best volume of poetry of the year
- 1967: Grace Leven Prize for Poetry for Collected Poems 1936–1967
- 1967: Colin Roderick Award for Collected Poems 1936–1967
- 1968: Britannica-Australia Award in the humanities
- 1979: Officer of the Order of Australia (AO)

== Bibliography ==
=== Poetry ===
Collections

- The green lions. 1936.
- The White Cry (1939)
- Elegy for an Airman (1940)
- Sonnets to the Unknown Soldier (1941)
- The Dosser in Springtime (1946)
- Glencoe (1947)
- Sun Orchids and Other Poems (1952)
- The Birdsville Track and Other Poems (1955)
- Rutherford and Other Poems (1962)
- The Dryad and Other Poems (1962)
- Australian Poets: Douglas Stewart (1963, with new editions in 1966 and 1973)
- Collected Poems 1936–1967 (1967)
- Selected Poems (1973)

Edited

- Selected Poems of Kenneth Mackenzie (1961)
- The Book of Bellerive (1961)
- A. D. Hope (1963)
- Hugh McCrae : Selected Poems (1966)

Anthologies (edited)

- Australia Poetry 1941 (1941)
- Australian Bush Ballads (1955, with Nancy Keesing)
- Old Bush Songs and Rhymes of Colonial Times (1957, with Nancy Keesing)
- Modern Australian Verse (1964)
- The Pacific Book of Bush Ballads (1967, with Nancy Keesing)

Selected list of poems

Title	Year	First published	Reprinted/collected
Leopard-Skin	1959	Stewart, Douglas (December 1959). "Leopard-Skin". Australian Letters. 2 (3): 32.	Collected Poems 1936–1967
Four-letter words	1965	Stewart, Douglas (March 1965). "Four-letter words". Meanjin Quarterly. 24 (1): 62–65.	Collected Poems 1936–1967

=== Short stories ===
- Coast to Coast : Australian Stories 1945 (1946, edited)
- Short Stories of Australia : The Lawson Tradition (1967, edited)
- Best Australian Short Stories (1971, edited with Beatrice Davis)

=== Verse plays ===
- The Fire on the Snow (first produced 1941, published 1944)
- Ned Kelly (first performed 1942) - filmed as Ned Kelly
- The Golden Lover (first performed 1943, and published with The Fire on the Snow 1944)
- Shipwreck (1947)
- The Earthquake Shakes the Land
- Fisher's Ghost

=== Radio plays ===
- The Enchanted Sailor

=== Other works ===
- A Girl with Red Hair (1944, short story collection)
- The Flesh and the Spirit (1948, criticism)
- The Seven Rivers (1966, essay collection)
- The Broad Stream (1975, criticism)
- Norman Lindsay: A Personal Memoir (1975)
- A Man of Sydney (on Kenneth Slessor) (1977)
- Writers of "The Bulletin" (1977)
- Springtime in Taranaki: An Autobiography of Youth (1983)
- Douglas Stewart's Garden of Friends (1987, published posthumously)

== External sources ==
- Goodwin, Ken (1986) A history of Australian literature ("Macmilllan history of literature" series), Basingstoke, Macmillan.
- Falkiner, Suzanne (1992) Wilderness (Series: Writers' Landscape), East Roseville, Simon and Schuster.
- Persse, Jonathan (November 2006). "Letters lifted into poetry". National Library of Australia News. XVII (2): 11–14. Archived from the original on 28 March 2012.
- Stewart, Douglas, Papers of Douglas Stewart and the Stewart family, 1911–1989: Biographical Note. Accessed 2007-08-15.
- Stewart, Meg (1985) Autobiography of my mother, Ringwood, Penguin.
- Wilde, W., Hooton, J. & Andrews, B (1994) The Oxford Companion of Australian Literature 2nd ed. South Melbourne, Oxford University Press.
