= Catherine Duncan =

Australian film director, actress and writer (1915–2006)

- Born: 17 March 1915; Launceston, Tasmania, Australia
- Died: 14 August 2006 (aged 91); Paris, France
- Other names: Katie Duncan
- Occupations: Actor, Director, Playwright,
- Partner(s): Roy Braddon Mitchell (1933- ? (divorced), Kim Keane (1937-1945) (divorced) (2 children), Roger Copillet (1954-1971) (his death)

Catherine Duncan (17 March 1915 – 14 August 2006) was an Australian documentary filmmaker, actor, playwright, film researcher, script writer, film critic, archivist, and collagist. She is most well known for her work in radio broadcasts and short documentary films.

== Early life ==
Catherine Duncan was born in 1915 in Launceston, Tasmania, to parents Gordon and Claire Duncan. Claire grew up immersed in the arts through her mother, who was an actress and producer herself. Duncan began acting by participating in Allan Wilkie's Shakespearian Company when it visited Launceston. When Duncan turned 16, she enrolled at the University of Melbourne to pursue an arts degree. While enrolled, she joined the Union Theatre Repertory Company and became their lead actress.

== Personal life ==
Duncan was married three times. Her first husband was Roy Mitchell, who later became a program director for Radio Australia. The two were only married for four years before getting a divorce. Next, Duncan met Kim Keane, a journalist with whom she had two children, Micheal and Margarita. In 1947, they divorced and Duncan decided to leave her children with her parents and move to Europe. On her way there, she met Roger Copillet, the first officer on the ship. They married in 1954 and she spent some years living with him in Paris.

== Career ==
Duncan began her career on stage by joining Melbourne's Worker's Theatre Group after university. Her first success as a playwright was when she won the Sydney Theatre League's Playwriting competition in 1937 for The Sword Sung.

Duncan also had a successful radio career where she performed and wrote shorts on air. For her success in radio, she was recognized with an inaugural Macquarie Award in 1946.

Title	Duncan's Role	Theatre/Media	Date
How to Escape from Prison	Scriptwriter	ABC Radio Melbourne, Melbourne, VIC	1936-09-13
Money With Menaces	Scriptwriter	ABC Radio Brisbane, South Brisbane, QLD	1940-03-13
No Time For Comedy	Actor	Theatre Royal, Sydney, NSW	1941-02-08
Private Lives	Actor	Theatre Royal, Sydney, NSW	1941-03-15
Ladies in Retirement	Actor	Theatre Royal, Sydney, NSW	1941-03-29
Soak the Rich	Playwright	Adelaide, SA	1941-04-03
Mr Smart Guy	Actor	Minerva Theatre, Kings Cross, NSW	1941-05-10
Moon Upside Down	Scriptwriter	ABC Radio Melbourne, Melbourne, VIC	1942-09-30
We The Living	Playwright	Melbourne, VIC	1945-01-01
Children in Uniform	Actor	2GB, Sydney	1946-04-07
Sons of the Morning	Playwright	New Theatre, Sydney, NSW	1945-06-23
Sons of Morning	Playwright	Rockhampton Little Theatre Inc, Rockhampton, QLD	1947-05-01
Roundabout	Adjudicator	National Theatre, Launceston, TAS	1957-04-03
The Rose and Crown	Adjudicator	National Theatre, Launceston, TAS	1957-04-03
The Verdict	Adjudicator	National Theatre, Launceston, TAS	1957-04-03
Among Those Present	Adjudicator	National Theatre, Launceston, TAS	1957-04-04
The Hands of Hardouin	Adjudicator	National Theatre, Launceston, TAS	1957-04-04
Sganarelle	Adjudicator	National Theatre, Launceston, TAS	1957-04-05
Her Husband's Consent	Adjudicator	National Theatre, Launceston, TAS	1957-04-06
Dragons in the Caves	Adjudicator	National Theatre, Launceston, TAS	1957-04-06
And Now- The Journey	Adjudicator	National Theatre, Launceston, TAS	1957-04-06
Pictures on the Wall	Adjudicator	National Theatre, Launceston, TAS	1957-10-06
The Hermit Crab	Scriptwriter	ABC Radio, Melbourne, VIC	1957-10-06

== Filmography ==
By the end of 1945, Duncan grew tired of radio and began to make documentary films with the Australian National Film Board and made documentaries to promote Australia to prospective immigrants. A few of her works were:

Film	Year
This is the Life in Geelong	1949
The Meeting Place	1948
Christmas Under the Sun	1947
Men Wanted	1947
This is the Life	1947

Catherine Duncan also worked together with radical film maker Joris Ivens and Marion Michelle on a documentary called Indonesia Calling. Duncan worked as a scriptwriter for the film, while Ivens was the Director and Michelle was the cinematographer.

== Select radio credits ==
- The Path of the Eagle
- The Moon Upside Down (1942)
- We Shall Not Lament the Dead (1945)
- The Other Side of Sundown (1945)

== Recognition ==
The Catherine Duncan Cup, awarded to the winner of an annual competition for Tasmanian amateur theatre groups, was named in her honour.
