= John Heyer =

Australian documentary filmmaker (1916–2001)

- Born: John Whitefoord Heyer; September 14, 1916; Devonport, Tasmania, Australia
- Died: June 19, 2001 (aged 84); London, England
- Occupations: Documentary film producer, director
- Spouses: Janet Heyer (née Dorothy Agnes Greenhalgh) (m. 1942) Irmtraud Schorbach (m. 1999)

John Whitefoord Heyer OAM OBE (14 September 1916 – 19 June 2001) was an Australian documentary filmmaker, who is often described as the father of Australian documentary film.

Heyer spent the majority of his career producing and/or directing sponsored documentaries, and was active from the 1930s until his death. His most successful film was The Back of Beyond (1954), but many of his films garnered awards at festivals around the world.

He was committed to the whole process of filmmaking from the initial research phase to distribution and exhibition. While he was grounded in the British documentary tradition, particularly during his years at the Australian National Film Board working under Ralph Foster and Stanley Hawes, he developed his own style noted for its lyrical quality.

Heyer was an active participant in the documentary film movement in Australia in the 1940s and 1950s: he was among the first producers employed by the Australian National Film Board, was head of the Shell Film Unit in Australia, and was President of the Sydney Film Society and on the committee which organised the first Sydney Film Festival.

He moved to England in 1956 where he continued to make films for Shell, and then through his own company. While he died in England, he maintained contact with Australia throughout his life, producing films in both countries.

== Life ==
Heyer was born in Devonport, Tasmania, the son of a doctor. He was educated at Scotch College, Melbourne. In 1942, he married Dorothy Agnes Greenhalgh (1916–1969) who was known, and credited, as Janet Heyer. Mrs Heyer was a regular, and essential, member of his film crew. Around this time they lived at Beecroft, New South Wales. They had two daughters, Elizabeth and Catherine (more commonly called Anna) and a son called Frederick.

The Heyers moved to England in 1956, and he lived there for the rest of his life, although he regularly returned to Australia and, at times, spent significant times there researching and producing films.

Janet Heyer died in 1969, and John Heyer died in 2001 in London, England.

== Early career ==
Heyer was apprenticed to the scientific instrument makers, Alger & Son but, having learnt sound recording and film projection at night school, he obtained a job with Efftee Studios in 1934 working with sound engineers, editors and cameramen. When Efftee closed in 1935, he joined Cinesound Productions.

In these early years he worked on such feature films as Heritage, Thoroughbred, White Death in which Zane Grey appeared, and Forty Thousand Horsemen. He also made commercials, training films and documentaries, his first documentary being New Pastures (1940) for the Milk Board. During these apprenticeship years, he worked with some of Australia's most experienced directors and cinematographers, including Charles Chauvel, Arthur Higgins and Frank Hurley.

In 1944, he joined Ealing Studios where he worked with Harry Watt on The Overlanders. It was on this film that he started to develop his vision of making the Australian landscape an active ingredient in Australian films. He strongly supported government involvement in film production and, when the Australian National Film Board was established in 1945, he was appointed its first senior producer. During this time he produced Native Earth, Journey of a Nation, The Cane Cutters, Men and Mobs, and This Valley is Ours.

As a young man learning his trade in the 1930s, Heyer was keen to expand his knowledge of international films. He worked with another young filmmaker of the period, Damien Parer and they became good friends, actively reading contemporary avant-garde cinema journals, which analysed the work and theories of European and Russian filmmakers, and watching such Soviet films as The Battleship Potemkin.

A keen supporter of films and the film industry all his life, he was actively involved in promoting and developing the Australian film society movement in the 1940s and 1950s. He was president of the Australian Council of Film Societies and the Sydney Film Society, and was involved in the establishment of the Sydney and Melbourne Film Festivals.

However, his involvement in the film society movement during the height of the Cold War also brought him to the notice of ASIO, the Australian Security Intelligence Organisation, which suspected him of being a communist.

== Shell Film Unit ==
Heyer left the government film unit to head the Shell Film Unit (Australia) in 1948. He was asked to produce a documentary that would capture the essence of Australia and in so doing associated Shell with Australia. The result was The Back of Beyond (1954) which quickly became a significant film in European and Australian film circles winning awards at several international festivals, including the Grand Prix Assoluto at the 1954 Venice Biennale. The British documentary filmmaker, Edgar Anstey, described the film as being "among the half-dozen best documentaries made anywhere since the war".

In 1956, he was appointed Executive Producer, Films and Television, for Shell International in London. During the 1950s and 60s he produced or directed over 60 films for Shell, including The Forerunner which won awards at Cannes, Venice, London and Turin Film Festivals.

In an article in 1957, he praised Shell for being "the first entry of a major private sponsor into the production and distribution of films in Australia on a solid basis".

For Heyer, production was only the beginning of the process. He saw distribution as being a critical issue for documentaries and was committed to developing good distribution networks. In an interview in 1976, he agreed that Shell's commitment to distribution, with its libraries and its vans fitted with projectors, was one of the issues that prompted his move from the Film Board.

== John Heyer Film Company ==
In 1967 he retired from Shell and set up the John Heyer Film Company through which he produced a series of documentaries including The Reef for the Australian Conservation Foundation.

In 1977, John Heyer had done extensive research to establish the predicted area the Pandora wreck was in and launched a discovery expedition with the help of Steve Domm. Ben Cropp, a television film maker, gained knowledge of Heyer's expedition and decided to launch his own search with the intention of following Heyer by boat; in this way Ben Cropp found the Pandora wreck on the Great Barrier Reef just before John Heyer did.

== Later career ==
Heyer lived in England for the rest of his life, but maintained a base in Australia, and regularly travelled between the two countries. In his later years, he continued to be in demand at conferences, such as the Australian International Documentary Conference and the Australian History and Film Conference, and other speaking engagements for his expertise and knowledge about documentary film-making in particular.

While, after his initial start in the industry, his career was primarily focused on documentary film, he had a long-standing wish to film Xavier Herbert's Capricornia, one which he was not able to realise before his death in 2001.

== Style ==
Academics and critics have written extensively on his influences, citing particularly his work with Harry Watt on The Overlanders (1944–1945), his training in the Grierson tradition under Stanley Hawes at the Australian National Film Board (1945 1948), and his interest in the British, Russian and American documentaries of the 1930s and 1940s.

All of these combine to create what Moran describes as "a distinctive Heyer signature. On the one hand a populism and a commitment to postwar reconstruction ... yet there is also a marked pictorialism. The images are frequently cut together into dynamic montage sequences, the rhythm of the soundtrack controlling and orchestrating the rhythm of the cutting".

His most significant films include The Cane-cutters and The Valley is Ours, made for the Australian National Film Board and both screened at the 1949 Cannes Film Festival, and the award-winning The Back of Beyond. These films are good examples of the way Heyer engaged "the aesthetic strategies of [the] international documentary movement filtered through a particular Australian creative imagination".

In 1982, Heyer said "A documentary film increases understanding of the subject and brings out its meaning or significance. At best it enlightens and stimulates; at worst it deceives. It must necessarily be highly creative, but to limit it to the creative treatment of actuality is inadequate. Whether or not it involves reality is unimportant: the essential thing is that it achieve its objective".

In other words, Heyer believed that documentary had to tell the truth about its subject but that it could use any of the tools at its disposal: re-enactment, drama, history, science. This was something he had demonstrated, to both critical and popular acclaim, in The Back of Beyond in 1954, and it remained his driving philosophy.

== Awards and recognition ==
Heyer's films garnered over 20 awards at various international film festivals. The following list represents a small sample of these awards and of other recognition he received:

- 1954: Grand Prix Assoluto at the Venice Biennale for The Back of Beyond
- 1958: AFI Award: Silver Medallion (Open) for The Forerunner
- 1958: Kodak Festival Award at the Melbourne Film Festival for The Forerunner
- 1958: Trophy presented by the University of Padua International Scientific Film Festival for The Forerunner
- 1970: OBE For service to the film industry.
- 1983: Retrospectives of his films at the Melbourne and Sydney Film Festivals
- 1997: OAM (Medal of the Order of Australia) For service to the media as a pioneer of documentary film in Australia and as a film producer and film director.
- 1999: Stanley Hawes Award for services to Australian documentary.

== Selected filmography ==
The dates cited below may vary in different sources; the terminology used for role attribution in documentary film is not always clearly articulated so that such terms as 'producer' and 'director' listed here may not necessarily be those used on the work itself. Works not listed include many of the short advertisements/commercials he produced during his career, both for Shell and through his own company.

=== The early years ===
- Heritage (General hand, 1935)
- Thoroughbred (General hand, 1936)
- White Death (Sound recordist, 1936)
- Holiday (Producer, 1939)
- 2000 Below (Director and Scriptwriter, 1939)
- Forty Thousand Horsemen (Cinematographer, 1940)
- It Wasn't Luck (Director and Scriptwriter, 1940)
- New Pastures (Director and Scriptwriter, 1940)
- Indonesia Calling (Camera for the scene which became the opening sequence, 1945)
- Jungle Conquest (Producer, Director and Scriptwriter, 1946)

=== The Australian National Film Board years ===
- Native Earth (Producer, Director and Scriptwriter, 1946)
- The Overlanders (Second Unit Director and Scriptwriter, 1946)
- Born in the Sun (Producer and Director, 1947)
- Journey of a Nation (Producer and Director, 1947)
- Lamb: The Story of the Fat Lamb Industry in Australia (Producer, 1947)
- Men and Mobs (Producer and Director, 1947)
- Born in the Sun (Producer and Director, 1948)
- The Cane Cutters (Producer, 1948)
- Knowledge Unlimited (Producer and Director, 1948)
- Turn the Soil (Producer and Director, 1948)
- The Valley is Ours (Director and Scriptwriter, 1948) Watch the video
- Kill As We Go (1948)

=== The Shell years ===
- Shellubrication (Producer and Director, 1951)
- Rankin's Springs is West (Producer, 1951)
- Saving Petrol: Correct Driving (Producer, 1952)
- The Back of Beyond (Producer, Director, Scriptwriter, Dialogue/Narration, 1954)
- Getting out of Trouble (Producer, 1954)
- On Stream (Producer, 1954)
- Playing with Water (Director, 1955)
- Let's Go (Producer and Director, 1956)
- Thrill Drivers (Producer, 1956)
- Saving Petrol: Correct Lubrication (Producer, 1956)
- Saving Petrol: Correct Maintenance (Producer, 1956)
- The Forerunner (Director, 1957)
- Ball and Chain (Director, 1957)
- City of Geelong (Producer, 1957)
- Paving the Way (Producer, 1957)
- Shell Paying Bay (Producer, 1958) OR The Paying Bay
- Arid Lands (Producer and Director, 1960)
- This is it (Producer, c.1960)
- Tumut Pond (Producer and Director, 1962)

=== The Later years ===
- Race Day (Producer, 1966)
- Infinite Pacific (Producer, 1969)
- Visible Manifestations (Director, 1975)
- The South Seas (Director, 1976)
- The Reef (Producer, Director and Scriptwriter, 1977)
- Hatta the Oasis (Producer and Scriptwriter, 1980)
- Mina Jebel Ali (Director, 1980)
- Dubai: State of Change (Director, 1980)
- Explorer Safari (Director, 1985)
- The Reef Builders (Producer, 1985)
