= Leioproctus gibber =

Scientific classification
- Kingdom: Animalia
- Phylum: Arthropoda
- Clade: Pancrustacea
- Class: Insecta
- Order: Hymenoptera
- Family: Colletidae
- Genus: Leioproctus
- Species: L. gibber

Binomial name
- Leioproctus gibber Batley, 2013

Species of bee

Leioproctus gibber, or Leioproctus (Protomorpha) gibber, is a species of bee in the family Colletidae and subfamily Colletinae. It is endemic to Australia. It was described by entomologist Michael Batley in 2013.

== Etymology ==
The specific epithet gibber (Latin: "hump") refers to the distinctive protuberance on the vertex of the female.

== Description ==
Male body length is about 5.7 mm, head width 1.9 mm; female body length 7.2 mm, head width 2.3 mm. Integumental colouration is mainly black and brown; the hair is white to pale orange.

== Distribution and habitat ==
The species occurs in inland eastern Australia. The type locality is Ethabuka Reserve in Central West Queensland.

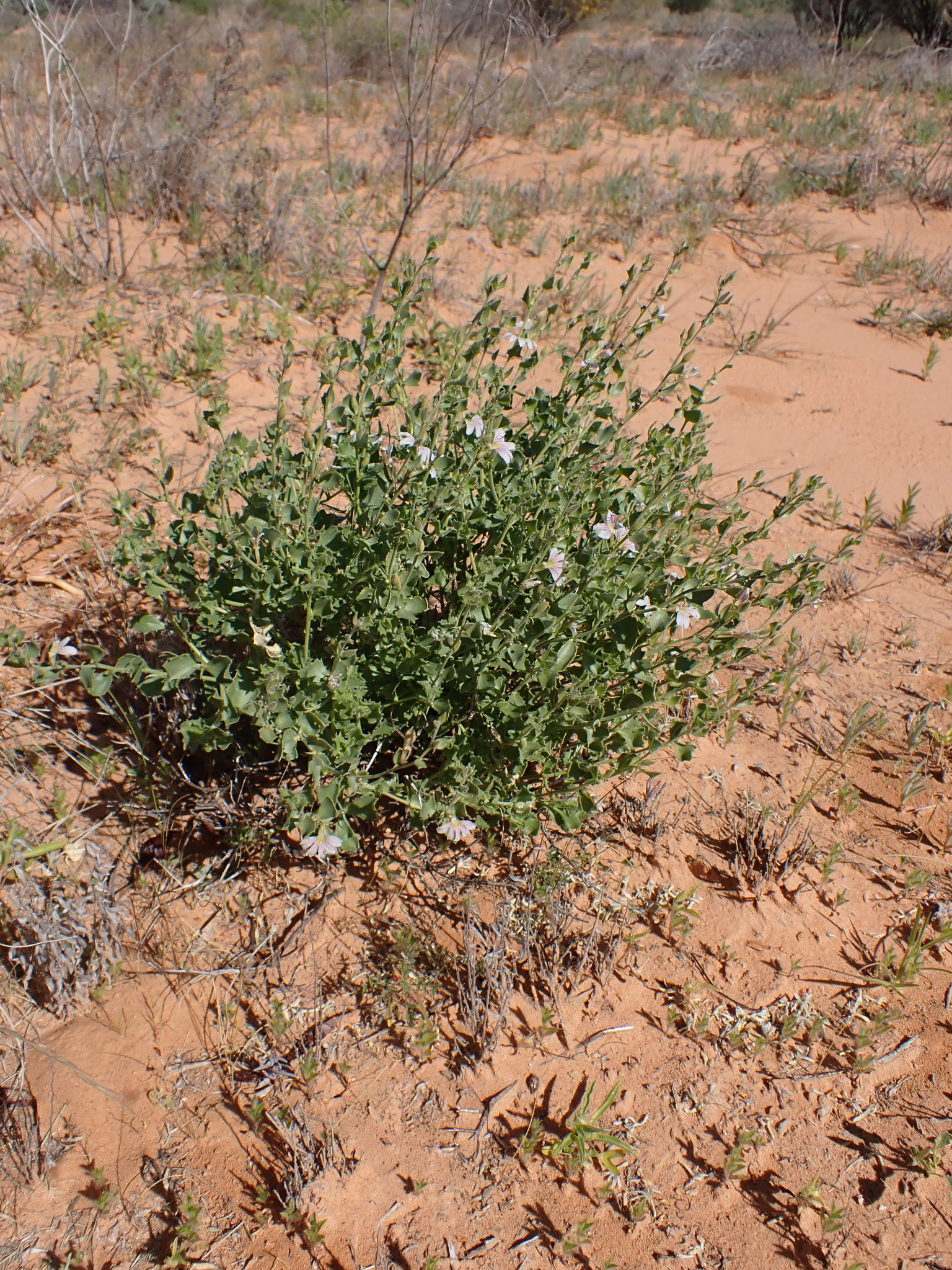
Scaevola parvibarbata, a forage plant of the bees

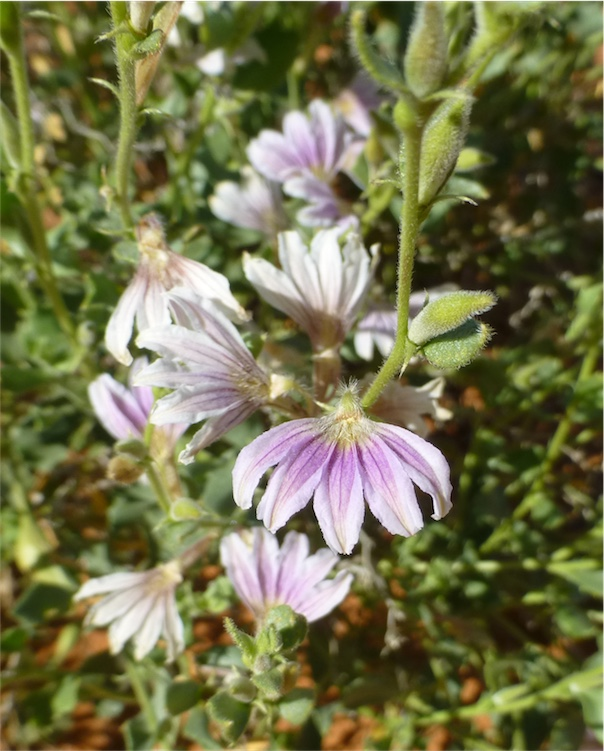
Scaevola parvibarbata flowers

== Behaviour ==
The adults are flying mellivores. Flowering plants visited by the bees include Scaevola parvibarbata and Scaevola depauperata.
