= Leioproctus latifrons =

Scientific classification
- Kingdom: Animalia
- Phylum: Arthropoda
- Clade: Pancrustacea
- Class: Insecta
- Order: Hymenoptera
- Family: Colletidae
- Genus: Leioproctus
- Species: L. latifrons

Binomial name
- Leioproctus latifrons Batley, 2013

Species of bee

Leioproctus latifrons, or Leioproctus (Protomorpha) latifrons, is a species of bee in the family Colletidae and subfamily Colletinae. It is endemic to Australia. It was described by entomologist Michael Batley in 2013.

== Etymology ==
The specific epithet latifrons (Latin: "broad brow") is an anatomical reference.

== Description ==
Male body length is about 5.7 mm, head width 1.9 mm; female body length 6.8 mm, head width 2.2 mm. Integumental colouration is mainly black with orange and brown markings; the hair is white to pale brown.

== Distribution and habitat ==
The species occurs across much of arid inland Australia. The type locality is Kunnamuka Swamp, near Ethabuka Reserve, in Central West Queensland on the edge of the Simpson Desert.

== Behaviour ==
The adults are flying mellivores. Flowering plants visited by the bees include Scaevola parvibarbata and Scaevola depauperata.

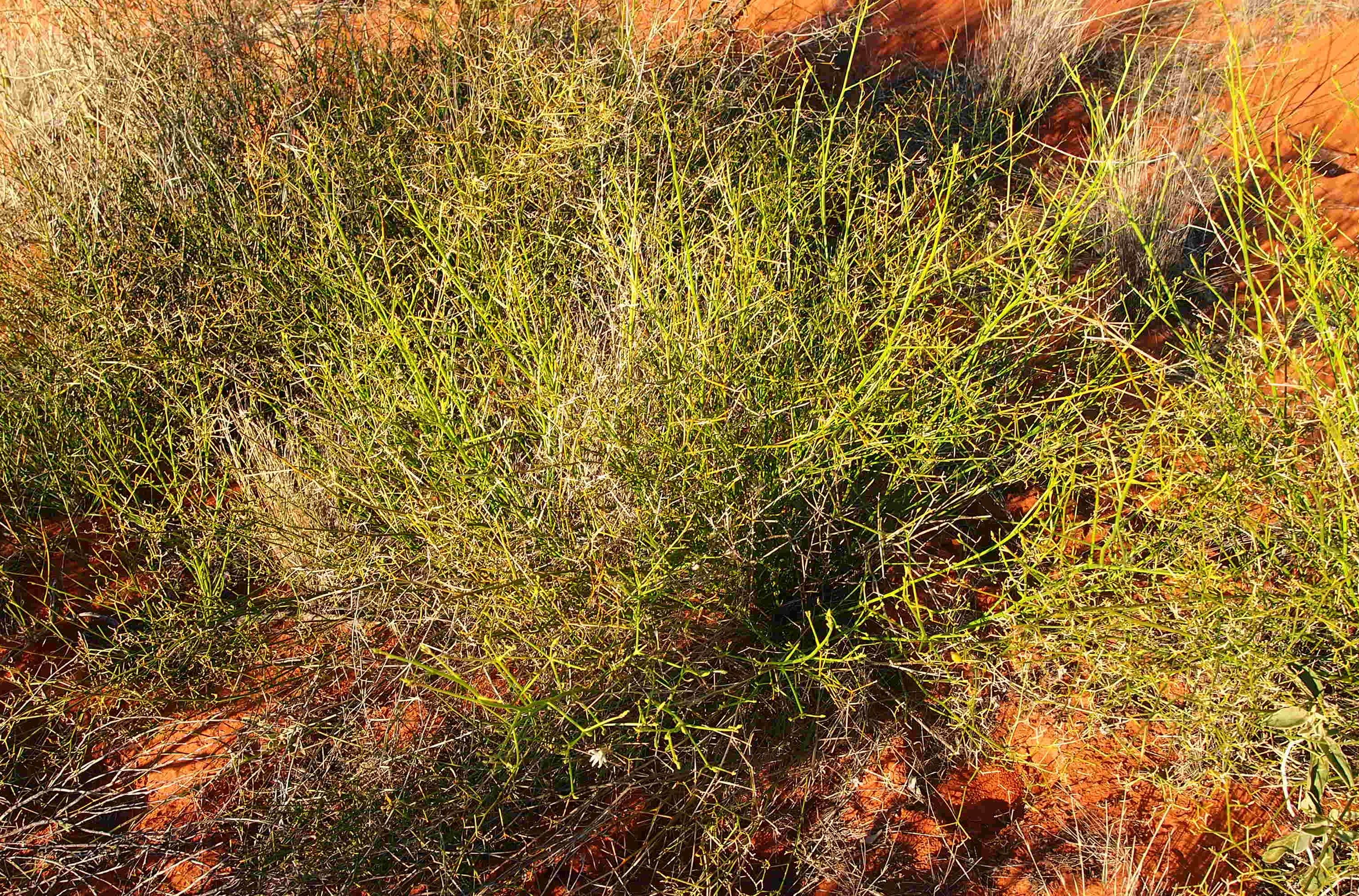
Scaevola depauperata (skeleton fan-flower), a forage plant of the bees

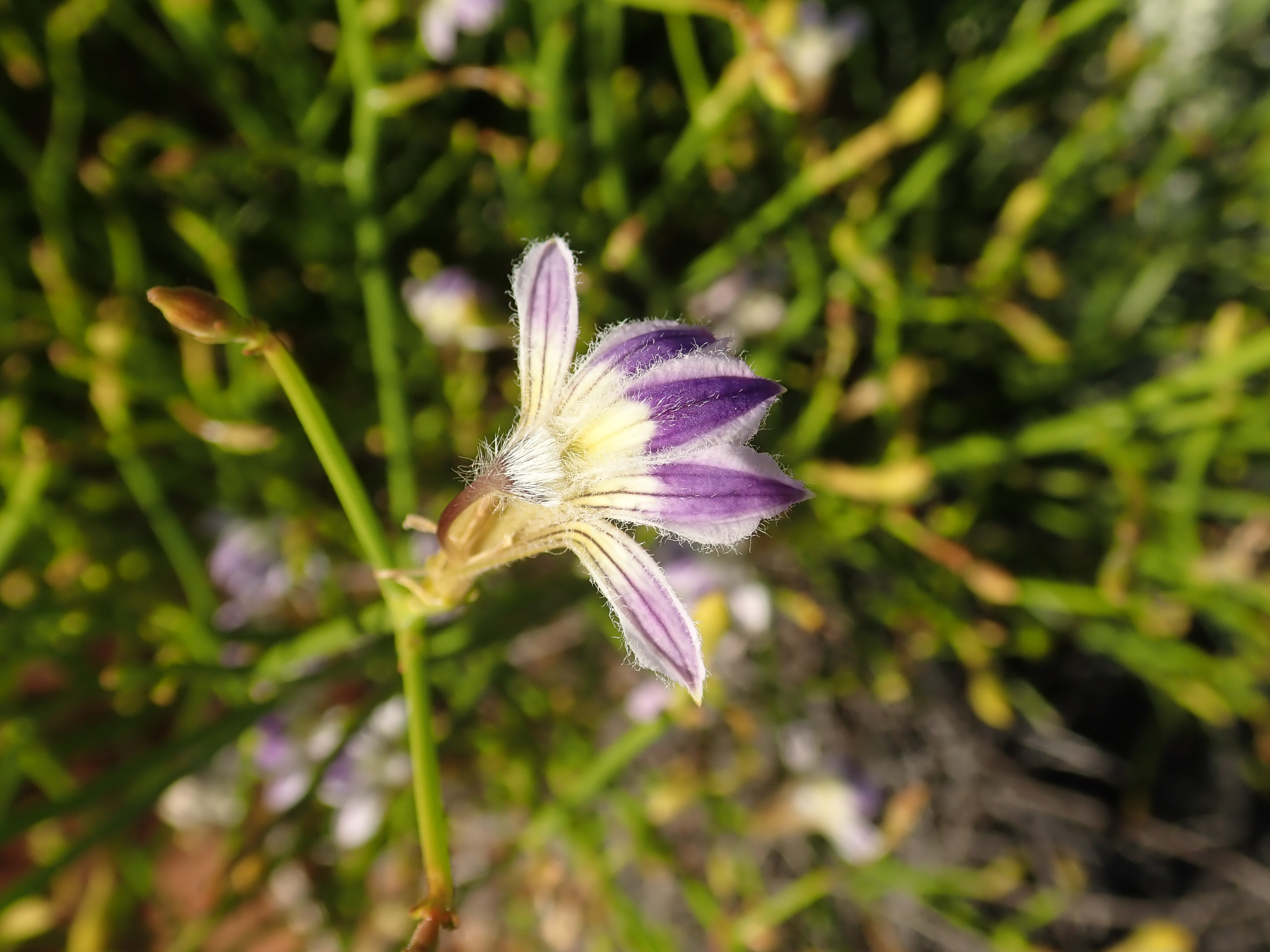
Scaevola depauperata flower
