= The Flying Swan (radio play) =

1939 Australian radio play by Catherine Shepherd

Wireless Weekly 5 April 1939

The Flying Swan is a 1939 Australian radio play by Catherine Shepherd. It told the story of Hans Christian Andersen. The play was one of Shepherd's major works.

The play was her fourth for the ABC.

The play was popular and was produced again in 1941, 1943, 1945 and 1949.

The play was produced in Canada. Its success prompted Shepherd to write a biographical play about John Bunyan, The Valiant Tinker.

According to Leslie Rees, with this play, "Shepherd took the problem of what shall a man write about, how shall he fix on his worthy and legitimate material. Hans Andersen, after many struggles, almost miraculously finds his true mission in writing fairy-stories based on his own poetically infused early experience."

== Premise ==
"Miss Shepherd pictures endearingly the strange anti-thesis between Andersen’s Simple Simon physical loutishness and his clear poetic vision and utter simplicity of spirit. The play is not so much a biography as a study of a dreamer's search for his essential self. In Copenhagen the lad who wanted so badly to write and sing was called a gnome, was ridiculed and insulted; but eventually he came into his own. His fairy stories were to bring the hobbledehoy of Odense to the notice of the famous Jenny Lind, and it is Jenny Lind who tells him in the play: “Go on, beautiful lonely swan, towards your destiny.” So, ultimately, Hans Andersen has his childish dream fulfilled, and returns in all honor, and to the pealing of bells, to his home town."
