= Catherine Shepherd (writer) =

Australian writer (1901–1976)

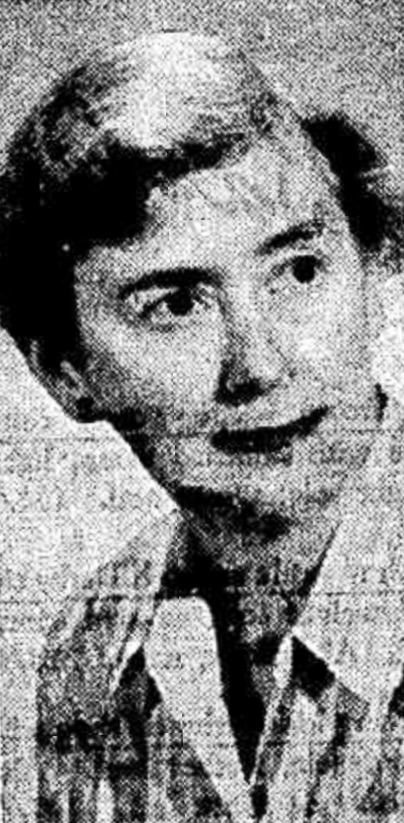
- Shepherd in 1954
- Born: 28 October 1901; Enkeldoorn, Southern Rhodesia (now Chivhu, Zimbabwe)
- Died: 18 February 1976 (aged 74); Hobart, Tasmania, Australia
- Education: University College, London
- Occupation: Playwright
- Writing career
- Notable works: Daybreak; Jane, My Love

Catherine Shepherd (28 October 1901 – 18 February 1976) was a Southern Rhodesian-born Australian writer. She wrote for journals, stage and radio – short stories, plays and serials.

== Early life and education ==
Born in Enkeldoorn, Southern Rhodesia (now Chivhu, Zimbabwe) on 28 October 1901, Catherine Shepherd was the daughter of Margaret and Edgar David Shepherd. Her father, a Church of England minister, died when she was very young, leaving her mother with little to support them. Returning to England, the pair lived with relations in Yorkshire. Shepherd was educated locally and then at Howell's School in Denbigh, Wales before graduating from the University College London with a BA in English in 1923 and then completing a DipEd.

== Career ==
In the mid-1930s, Shepherd contributed short stories to The Australian Woman's Mirror and to The Mercury.

In 1938, Shepherd taught English at the Collegiate School in Hobart. She had previously been an assistant teacher in Adelaide, Sydney and Bathurst when she applied to the Tasmanian Teachers and Schools Registration Board for certification.

Her first play, Daybreak, was broadcast on ABC Radio in May 1938 before its stage premiere at the Theatre Royal, Hobart in July of the same year.

In 1946 her radio serial Children of Magpie Gully was broadcast by 2FC, replacing Gwen Meredith's Anderson Place in the time-slot. Also in 1946 she dramatized Ernestine Hill's My Love Must Wait, about Matthew Flinders, for ABC radio.

== Death ==
Shepherd died at St Ann's Rest Home in Hobart on 18 February 1976. Her remains were cremated. She left her AU$58,353 estate to St Ann's.

== Selected works ==
- Daybreak
- Jane, My Love
- Delphiniums
- Seapiece
- Lethe Wharf
- My Love Must Wait
- The Hermit Crab
- Sabotage (1940) - radio play
- Conflict in Van Diemen's Land
- The Starlit Valley
- I Saw the New Moon
- The Flying Swan
- Exit Socrates
- A Citizen of the World
- The Heroic Journey
- The Hayfield
- Three Mile Cross
- The Valiant Tinker
- Balzac
- The Golden Cockerel
- Down to Earth
- The Empty Shrine
- The Fated Hour
