= Lure of the Inland Sea =

1945 Australian radio play

- Genre: drama play
- Running time: 60 mins
- Country of origin: Australia
- Language: English
- Written by: Dymphna Cusack
- Original release: 1945

Lure of the Island Sea is a 1945 Australian radio play by Dymphna Cusack about Charles Sturt. It was one of Cusack's main radio plays and was recorded in Melbourne.

The play focused on Sturt's expedition to discover the inland sea. Cusack had written a piece about the expedition in 1944.

It is not to be confused with another radio play about Sturt, The Heroic Journey.

== Cast ==
- Walter Pym as Charles Sturt
- Douglas Reid
- Reginald Goldsworthy
- John D'arcy
