= My Love Must Wait =

1941 novel by Ernestine Hill

- Author: Ernestine Hill
- Language: English
- Subject: Matthew Flinders
- Genre: historical
- Publication place: Australian
- English publication date: 1941

My Love Must Wait is a 1941 novel by Ernestine Hill.

== Premise ==
Matthew Flinders goes on a voyage to Australia to circumnavigate and chart its coast. He leaves behind his new wife, Ann Chappell. His return is delayed by six years' imprisonment on Ile-de-France.

== Reception ==
The Sydney Morning Herald reviewer, while considering that the "first hundred pages or so of this book are very well written", showing Hill's "flair for vivid and beautiful descriptive writing", felt the later part of the book was overwritten and should "be pruned ruthlessly".

One critic, writing about Catherine Shepherd's radio adaptation, reckoned Hill's book owed much to Professor Sir Ernest Scott's 1914 biography The Life of Captain Matthew Flinders.

== Radio adaptation ==
The novel was turned into a 12-part 1946 radio serial adapted by Catherine Shepherd starring Peter Finch (Flinders), Lesley Pope (Ann) and Alfred Bristowe (William Bligh).

The ABC adapted the novel again for radio in 1974, with Joy Hollyer doing the script. Wyn Roberts and Fay Kelton starred.

== Proposed film ==
In 1946 it was announced Charles Chauvel bought the film rights. However no film resulted.
