= Exit Socrates =

1939 Australian radio play by Catherine Shepherd

- Genre: drama play
- Running time: 30 mins (8:00 pm – 8:30 pm)
- Country of origin: Australia
- Language: English
- Hosted by: ABC
- Written by: Catherine Shepherd
- Directed by: Frank Willis
- Original release: 5 January 1939

Exit Socrates is a 1939 Australian radio play by Catherine Shepherd. It was considered one of the more notable Australian radio plays of that year.

The play was performed again later in 1939 and in 1945.

== Premise ==
"Mr Rowlands, the little school master was a failure at fifty-five, because he ’ taught the “dangerous” practice that children should be made to think for themselves rather than follow a leader blindly. And the manner in which he showed the courage of his convictions forms the dramatic movement for this latest play of the Tasmanian author, Catherine Shepherd. She has taken the immortal death of Socrates to give point to the moral that the path of sincere individualism is sown with thorns and briars."
