= The Empty Shrine =

1939 radio play by Catherine Shepherd

- Wireless Weekly 10 May 1939
- Genre: drama play
- Running time: 60 mins (8:15 pm – 9:15 pm)
- Country of origin: Australia
- Language: English
- Home station: 2FC
- Syndicates: ABC
- Written by: Catherine Shepherd
- Directed by: Lawrence Cecil
- Original release: May 14, 1939

The Empty Shrine is a 1939 Australian radio play by Catherine Shepherd. It was one of her psychological dramas.

The play was one of Shepherd's key works from this period.

== Premise ==
"It is the story of a young man who is encouraged by his petting and adoring mother to believe that he has the makings in him of a brilliant writer. He breaks off an engagement with one girl, Jan, who is too real for him; and even his wife, Coral, eventually sees that they have both been worshipping at an Empty Shrine."
