= Santa Claus of Christmas Creek =

- Genre: drama play
- Running time: 30 mins
- Country of origin: Australia
- Language: English
- Syndicates: ABC
- Written by: Ernestine Hill
- Original release: 28 December 1938

Santa Claus of Christmas Creek is a 1938 Australian radio play by Ernestine Hill. It was one of the most popular Australian radio plays of its era, being produced in 1938, 1939, 1942, 1946 and 1951.

== Background ==
The play was published in a 1946 collection of Australian radio plays. The Bulletin called it "a trifle as harmless and pleasant as Father Christmas himself. "

The play was based on a 1934 short story by Hill.

According to Leslie Rees, " It shows the fearsome loneliness of that far life, where nevertheless the station owner’s wife, forlorn in childlessness, is determined to celebrate Christmas as she has known it, by giving the blacks on her station a good time, with baccy and sweets and fireworks and prizes. There is something ineffably touching about the fall of her jaw as her husband insists that Christmas goings-on depend on the arrival of Billy Bond’s truck, and there are two creeks down already and the river’s coming up. “If she runs a banker, Christmas won’t be here till the middle of March.” But they have their Christmas, and Mrs. Hill's detailed observation is most revealing."

== Premise ==
The play was set in north west Australia. "Joe Hackett and Janet, his wife, live on an isolated station, awaiting the rains, but also hoping to have a good time at Christmas — providing the stores arrive. Janet is the only white woman in hundreds of square miles. The other characters are Lorimer, a prospector, whose wife has just died and left a tiny baby on his hands; a camp of blacks; and Dolly-pot Mick, a curious old “hatter,” whose long life in the raw bush has made him both a comic and pathetic figure."
