= Delphiniums (radio play) =

1943 Australian stage play

Delphiniums is a 1943 Australian stage play by Catherine Shepherd.

The play was published in a 1944 collection of Australian plays. The Sydney Morning Herald said it "seems to sound a false note at the end (has she overdone it? Only the stage would reveal this)."

The Age said it "is rather on the sentimental side, but is most competently handled."
