= A Citizen of the World =

1940 radio play by Catherine Shepherd

A citizen of the World
- Genre: drama play
- Running time: 45 mins (8:30 am – 9:15 am)
- Country of origin: Australia
- Language: English
- Hosted by: ABC
- Written by: Catherine Shepherd
- Directed by: Paul O'Loughlin
- Original release: 22 August 1940

A Citizen of the World is a 1940 Australian radio play by Catherine Shepherd about Oliver Goldsmith. It was one of her most notable works.

The play was an entrant in the 1940 Australian Radio Play Competition.

Leslie Rees said it "illustrated the difficulty of writing one’s best when a bread-and-butter living has to be earned". He elaborated, "shows a man of real genius and integrity being led towards the different prison of Hackdom, the spiderweb gradually closing in to destroy him. And his quiet resolution, despite natural human fears, to go forth into loneliness and hunger, but to remain free."

The play was produced again in 1941 and 1943. The later versions were rewritten from the 1940 entry.

== Premise ==
"The play gives a touchingly attractive portrait of the younger Oliver Goldsmith, the man of 30, friend of the poor, an unsuccessful school usher, author of a few essays and verses, seeing himself approaching a critical literary crossroads. One road leads to a life of successful hack journalism, the other to semi-starvation and real writing achievement. It is a hard choice. The play is a study in 18th century Grub-street ways to be set beside Miss Shepherd’s plays of Mary Mitford, Hans Anderson and John Bunyan. The present version amplifies the previous picture of a lovable and courageous character."
