= The Golden Cockerel (radio play) =

1951 radio play by Catherine Shepherd

- Genre: drama play
- Running time: 60 mins (7:30 pm – 8:30 pm)
- Country of origin: Australia
- Language: English
- Home station: 2BL
- Hosted by: ABC
- Written by: Catherine Shepherd
- Directed by: John Cairns
- Original release: 26 November 1951

The Golden Cockerel is a 1951 Australian radio play by Catherine Shepherd about Alexander Pushkin. It was one of a series of plays from Shepherd on writers.

The play was produced again in 1952, twice.

Reviewing the 1952 production, The Age said " it became tedious so that attention wandered long before its end. Nor did the prolonged and thoroughly artificial death scene at the end improve matters. Here was a story but the people in it never really came to life and the most important thing in any drama is that its characters shall live."

== Premise ==
"Well-born, Pushkin is shown spend-ing a wild, brilliant youth. The play reveals his developing social conscience, how he sees, himself as a golden cockerel who warns the world of peril and crows for liberty. He is exiled, then he marries the empty-headed Natalia. It is through his love of her and his jealous suspicions that, instead of remaining a golden cockerel, he falls prey to vulgar passions and descends to the behaviour of a game-cock. "
