= The Heroic Journey =

1944 radio play by Catherine Shepherd

- Genre: drama play
- Running time: 60 mins (8:30 pm – 9:30 pm)
- Country of origin: Australia
- Language: English
- Hosted by: ABC
- Written by: Catherine Shepherd
- Original release: 10 August 1940

The Heroic Journey is a 1944 radio play by Catherine Shepherd about Charles Sturt. It concerned Sturt's voyage to the Australian interior. The play was made for the centenary of Sturt's expedition.

The play was produced again in 1946.

It was considered one of Shepherd's most notable works. The play is not to be confused with another about Sturt, Lure of the Inland Sea.
