= Jane, My Love =

1951 stage play by Catherine Shepherd

- Original language: English
- Written by: Catherine Shepherd
- Genre: drama
- Setting: Hobart

Premiere
- Date: September 22, 1951
- Place: Theatre Royal, Hobart

Jane, My Love is a 1951 stage play by Catherine Shepherd about Jane Franklin and John Franklin.

It was commissioned for the Jubilee of Federation celebrations.

The Hobart Mercury said "The play scarcely is entertaining, except for those familiar with early Tasmanian history. However, as an historical work commissioned for the Commonwealth Jubilee, it is a splendid documentary of five years in the lives of Sir John and Lady Franklin in Hobart Town."

== The Franklins of Hobart Town ==
The play was adapted for radio in 1952 as The Franklins of Hobart Town. Its running time was 60 minutes.

Writer Leslie Rees said "It gave a picture, too diffuse in its stage original, of the Tasmanian capital as Lieutenant-Governor Franklin and his remarkable wife knew it, and dramatized the conflict with the Colonial Secretary, Montagu, a contest of wills that led to the recall of Franklin to Britain."

According to ABC Weekly "the Franklins had faced the dangers and privations of exploration; now that Sir John was Lieutenant-Governor of Tasmania his enemy was petty malice and intrigue. The Colonial Secretary, Mr. Montagu, was his most dangerous enemy, and in this play Catherine Shepherd tells of his struggle to humble the Franklins."

The radio play was performed again in 1953.

=== 1953 Cast ===
- Alfred Brlstowe as Sir John Franklin
- Winifred Hindle as Lady Franklin
- Kevin Brennan as Mr. Montagu
- Beryl Marshall as Eleanor Franklin
- Georgie Sterling as Sophy Cracroft
- Richard Meikle as Tom Cracroft
- David Butler as Mr- Forster
- Gordon Chater as Count Strzelecki
- Muriel Steinbeck as Miss Williamson
- John Parker as Joseph Hodder
- Marshall Crosby as Hepburn
- Audrey Teesdate as Miss Hayter
- Dorothy Dunckley as Mrs. Dowblggin
- Laurel Mather as Miss Clandike
- Madge Ryan as Mrs. Barton
- Bruce Stewart as Mr. Gell
- Brian Wright as Narrator

Producer: Eric John.
