= Seapiece =

1938 Australian radio play

- Genre: drama play
- Running time: 60 mins (8:00 pm – 8:50 pm)
- Country of origin: Australia
- Language: English
- Hosted by: ABC
- Written by: Catherine Shepherd
- Directed by: Lawrence Cecil
- Original release: 11 August 1938

Seapiece is a 1938 Australian radio play by Catherine Shepherd about an out of work actor.

The play was one of Shepherd's key works.

The play was produced again in 1942, 1948 and 1952.

== Premise ==
"Sea Piece takes us not to a ship, but to a middle-grade guest house at a coastal resort in England; the chief characters are a down-and-out actor and an engaged young woman who has just won £100 in a competition. From these not very unusual materials, Catherine Shepherd builds a drama which has observation behind every speech, and which suddenly rivets one with its decision to treat an apparently romantic situation with earnest realism."
