= I Saw the New Moon =

1940 radio play by Catherine Shepherd

- Wireless Weekly 9 November 1940
- Other names: drama play
- Running time: 60 mins (8:00 pm – 9:00 pm)
- Country of origin: Australia
- Language: English
- Syndicates: ABC
- Written by: Catherine Shepherd
- Original release: November 13, 1940

I Saw the New Moon is a 1940 Australian radio play by Catherine Shepherd.

It was a story of university life.

The play was well received and produced again in 1946.

== Reception ==
Leslie Rees called it "one of Catherine Shepherd's studies in self-realisation, in man's coming to terms with himself after error or misunderstanding, difficulty, crisis. The whole of Miss Shepherd's work seems concerned with the sensitive exposition and varied treatment of that thesis of peace-through-struggle. I Saw the New Moon is a story, not completely digested perhaps, but full of colour, association, good sense and character-interest, of a young girl under-graduate's search for a way of life, a way of thought."

The Advocate called it "convincingly presented, even if there is a suggestion of melodrama in the longdrawn-out screams of hapless Mrs. Tyson, and of "cheapness" and "flippancy" in the views of the "intellectual"—who really wasn't."

== Premise ==
"A story of University life, starting with the boisterous good humour of a students' social, but moving on to show the drama of a young woman's temporary loss of faith in life, due to association with a defeatist-minded intellectual. As might be expected, Miss Shepherd sketches in with keen observation the details of a student's rag followed by characteristically earnest discussion of life, and incidentally gives the very smell and musty-drab colouring of a third-rate lodging house where Christina West has her room. I Saw the New Moon is a symbolic title. This is a play in which humour and emotional crises alternate."
