= Conflict in Van Diemen's Land =

- Genre: drama play
- Running time: 60 mins (8:00 pm – 9:00 pm)
- Country of origin: Australia
- Language: English
- Hosted by: ABC
- Written by: Catherine Shepherd
- Directed by: John Cairns
- Original release: 17 April 1945

Conflict in Van Diemen's Land is a 1945 Australian radio play by Catherine Shepherd. It concerned Governor Arthur's war against Tasmanian Aboriginals in colonial Tasmania. John Cairns directed.

The play was repeated in 1945 and produced again in 1946.

== Premise ==
According to ABC Weekly "In 1824 there was much rejoicing in Hobart Town when Governor Arthur arrived, but gaiety was shortlived. His cold, formal manner, his iron discipline, were soon manifest. He stifled freedom of the press, imprisoned the editor who dared to criticise the Government. Officials who disagreed with his methods were soon relieved of office. He ignored criticism, treated free settlers like convicts. Then he failed in the £30,000 war against the blacks. Theme of Miss Shepherd's trenchant play is that free peoples—be they black or white —will never submit to the power of a tyrant."
