= Lethe Wharf =

1939 Australian radio play

- Wireles Weekly 12 July 1939
- Genre: drama play
- Running time: 60 mins (8:00 pm – 9:00 pm)
- Country of origin: Australia
- Language: English
- Written by: Catherine Shepherd
- Directed by: John Cairns
- Original release: July 1939

Lethe Wharf is a 1939 Australian radio play by Catherine Shepherd. The play was one of Shepherd's key works.

The play was produced again in 1945.

The radio critic from Wireless Weekly called it "a most unusual play... the playwright presents no ordinary murder mystery. She tackles a social problem, flings a fierce criticism at a certain class of women, and tells a pitiful story of the fate of the little capitalist."

== Premise ==
"“I killed you, didn’t I? I can’t get over it. I never thought I’d do a thing like that. I’ve never wanted to hurt anyone ... I can’t forget it... wanting to kill you . . . meaning to kill you... It was like a black shadow over me. That’s why I’m afraid here . . . It s dark . . .” Thus Shaddv to Giles, as they stood on the little wharf facing the dim, mysterious river, while the green light of the boat winked in the shadows—Lethe, River of Forgetfulness. Why did Shaddv kill Giles? To tell that, the author must unwind the dark cable of the story that brought their frustrated lives together."
