= The Fated Hour =

1938 Australian radio play

The Fated House
- Genre: drama play
- Running time: 9:00 pm–
- Country of origin: Australia
- Language: English
- Hosted by: ABC
- Written by: Catherine Shepherd
- Original release: 16 July 1938

The Fated Hour is a 1938 Australian radio play by Catherine Shepherd about a woman who has her fortune told.

The play was well received and performed again in 1939, 1944, 1946 1945, 1946, 1950 and 1958.

A critic of the 1950 production called it "entertaining enough... although the surprise ending was a bit obvious."

== Premise ==
"Lorita Sanderson was a rising actress with little fear of interruption to her brilliant career. Then she went to see a fortune-teller, Mrs. Bates... When Mrs. Bates is asked to say what Lorita will be at 4 p.m. on March 15, her birthday, Mrs. Bates foretells a future that Lorita feels she must at all costs avoid. So worried is she by the possibility that Mrs. Bates’ prediction may come true that she refuses to take the lucrative and enticing star-part which a producer offers her, and hides herself away in a country cottage... Lorita drives herself almost into a frenzy—and her friends’ stories of other successful predictions by Mrs. Bates do not help her sanity."
