= The Starlit Valley =

- Genre: drama play
- Running time: 60 mins
- Country of origin: Australia
- Language: English
- Written by: Catherine Shepherd
- Original release: 2 June 1940

The Starlit Valley is a 1940 Australian radio play by Catherine Shepherd.

It was the first play produced in a 1940 ABC Play Competition by the ABC.

The play was produced again in 1953. Rod Taylor starred in this production.

== Reception ==
Reviewing the 1953 production The Age said "There was plenty of scope for good drama but the whole thing petered out most miserably when the girl, who was no better than she should have been, ran away with some bushrangers and the disillusioned" young man responded to the pleadings of his brother- to return to England."

ABC Weekly said "we seemed set for a romantic tale of gallantry and love, but the journey (or was it the pious atmosphere of Hobart Town?), transformed the hero into a sanctimonious and weakly poetic missionary whom no girl, honest or otherwise, could have put up with for five minutes. So she set fire to the property and ran off with a bush-ranger, and uy best wishes went with her."

== Premise ==
According to ABC Weekly, "Robert Clare is an English younger son, an idealist with a sensitive eye for beauty. At the country home of the elder brother Stephen he sees a girl standing in a garden with a sheaf of daffodils in her arms. She is Harriet Barnes, governess in the home, and to Robert she is the epitome of loveliness and innocence. He returns later on from the Continent to find she has been transported to Van Diemen’s Land. Love and indignation make him deaf to advice; he resolves to follow her, to make up to her for everything she has suffered, to marry her. It is an idyllic plan, but does not allow for the possibility that Harriet may have different ideas."
