= Sabotage (radio play) =

- Genre: drama play
- Running time: 60 mins (8:00 pm – 9:00 pm)
- Country of origin: Australia
- Language: English
- Hosted by: ABC
- Written by: Catherine Shepherd
- Directed by: John Cairns
- Original release: 4 December 1940

Sabotage is a 1940 Australian radio play by is a radio play by Catherine Shepherd. It imagines what it might be like to turn into a fifth column in Australia.

Leslie Rees called it a play that "predicates a tragedy which, having happened to others in Holland, Norway and elsewhere, might easily happen to persons in our own midst."

The play was performed again in 1941.

A copy of the play is at the Fryer Library.

Wireless Weekly called it "perhaps the most penetrating piece of drama she [Catherine Shepherd] has given radio to date" and "shows with valuable clarity the insidious appeal of Nazi concepts to the man who is tired of democracy’s cumbersome working."

== Premise ==
Richard Gale, a struggling intellectual, becomes attracted to Nazism during the Depression. He agrees to work for the Nazi Party.
