= The Hayfield =

- Genre: drama play
- Running time: 30 mins (10:30 pm – 11:00 pm)
- Country of origin: Australia
- Language: English
- Hosted by: ABC
- Written by: Catherine Shepherd
- Original release: 15 April 1945

The Hayfield is a 1945 Australian radio play by Catherine Shepherd. It was one of her most notable works.

The play was well received and was performed again in 1953.

== Premise ==
According to ABC Weekly "as wealthy Bernard Loder, blinded by sunstroke, lies dying in hospital, he remembers the day in his childhood when he, his sister, and their governess went to play in a hayfleld and it seems to him that all the evil in his life began on that day This new play, by well-known Tasmanian author Catherine Shepherd, is written in a musing, reflective tone, and ends on a contrasting note of bitter irony. It is nostalgic yet vivid, and the insight into personality is penetrating."
