= Oliver Goldsmith =

Anglo-Irish writer (1728–1774)

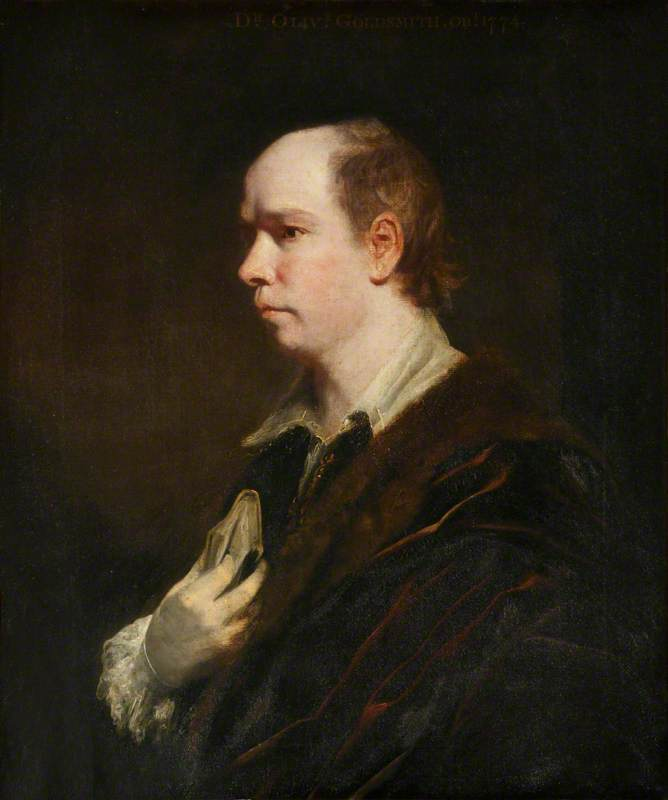
- Portrait by Sir Joshua Reynolds, c. 1770
- Born: Oliver Goldsmith; 10 November 1728; Either Ballymahon, County Longford, or Elphin, County Roscommon, Ireland
- Died: 4 April 1774 (aged 45); London, England
- Resting place: Temple Church, London
- Education: Trinity College Dublin (BA); University of Edinburgh (MD)
- Occupations: Playwright; novelist; hack writer; poet; busker; apothecary's assistant
- Partner: Mary Horneck (1766–1774)
- Writing career
- Pen name: James Willington
- Language: English
- Years active: 1760–1773
- Period: Georgian era
- Genres: Social commentary, sentimentalism, literary realism, comedy
- Notable works: The History of Little Goody Two-Shoes (unconfirmed, 1765); The Vicar of Wakefield (1766); The Good-Natur'd Man (1768); The Deserted Village (1770); She Stoops to Conquer (1773)
- Movements: Classicism, The Club

Signature
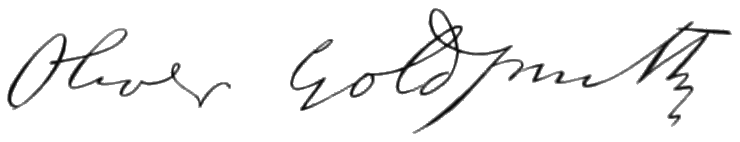

Oliver Goldsmith (10 November 1728 – 4 April 1774) was an Anglo-Irish poet, novelist, playwright, and hack writer. He produced literary works in a variety of genres and is considered one of the most versatile writers of the Georgian era. His works are known for their realistic depictions of British society, and his comedy plays for the English stage are considered second in importance only to those of playwright William Shakespeare. Credited with introducing sentimentalism in English literature in 18th-century Great Britain, several of Goldsmith's publications are popular classics of the period, including his only novel, The Vicar of Wakefield (1766), and the comedy play She Stoops to Conquer (1773).

He wrote the play The Good-Natur'd Man (1768) and is additionally thought by commentators such as Washington Irving to have written the children's novel The History of Little Goody Two-Shoes (1765), one of the earliest classical works of children's literature. Goldsmith also produced a number of poems during his career, such as The Deserted Village (1770), and contributed to the flourishing of idyllic poetry during the Georgian era.

After spending his early years in Dublin, he settled in London in 1756, where he met many of the writers who shaped his later career, and the majority of his works were written after this period. His first works were published in his The Citizen of the World series in 1760, often under the pseudonym James Willington. Beginning in the 1760s, he maintained a close friendship with Samuel Johnson, another prolific English writer who played a significant role in promoting his poems. His personal mentorship and guidance resulted in Goldsmith expanding his literary writings to include political works. This long-term collaboration between the two authors has been described as "one of the most fruitful intellectual partnerships in 18th-century English letters." In 1764, he became one of the earliest members of Johnson's literary intellectual circle, popularly known as The Club. Although Goldsmith wrote extensively to supplement his income, he was constantly in financial debt and regularly suffered from ill health. He died in 1774 in London at the age of 45 and was buried in Temple Church.

During the 19th century, Goldsmith became regarded as a seminal figure of sentimental literature, having influenced later English authors Charles Dickens, Jane Austen, George Eliot, and Mary Shelley, all of whom mentioned his characters in their own novels. He continues to be held in high regard in his native Ireland and Great Britain, with many statues, libraries, schools, and streets named after him. Since his death, his magnum opus, The Vicar of Wakefield, has retained its reputation as one of the best-known novels of 18th-century English literature, and his play She Stoops to Conquer remains an influential study in theater classes.

== Early life ==
Goldsmith's birth date and year are not known with certainty. According to the Library of Congress authority file, he told a biographer that he was born on 10 November 1728. The location of his birthplace is also uncertain. He was born either in the townland of Pallas, near Ballymahon, County Longford, Ireland, where his father was the Anglican curate of the parish of Forgney, or at the residence of his maternal grandparents, at the Smith Hill House near Elphin in County Roscommon, where his grandfather Oliver Jones was a clergyman and master of the Elphin diocesan school, and where Oliver studied.

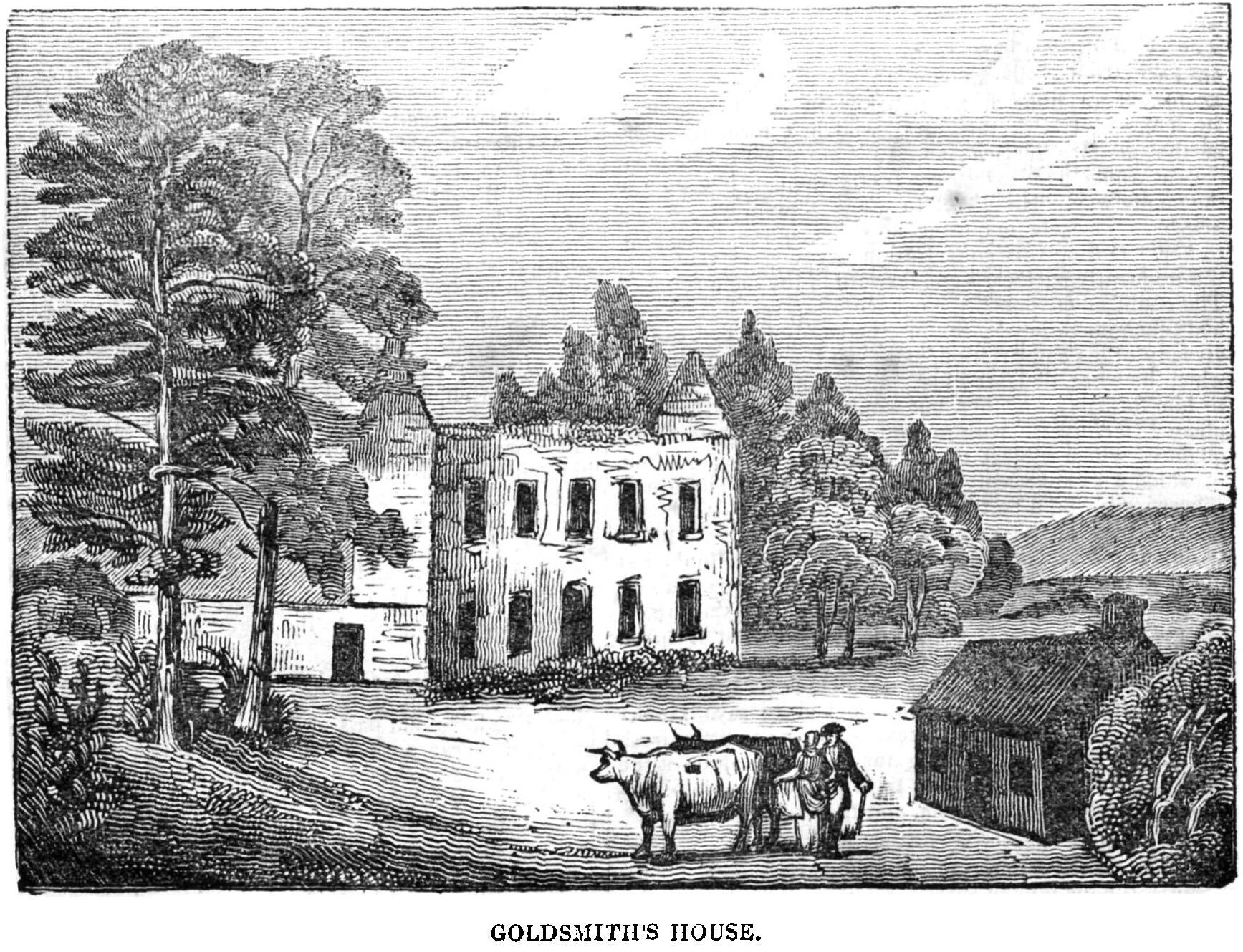
Goldsmith's family home in Auburn, Kilkenny, Dublin Penny Journal, 1834

When Goldsmith was two years old, his father was appointed the rector of the parish of "Kilkenny West" in County Westmeath. The family moved to the parsonage at Lissoy, between Athlone and Ballymahon, and continued to live there until his father's death in 1747.

In 1744, Goldsmith went up to Trinity College Dublin. His tutor was Theaker Wilder. Neglecting his studies in theology and law, he fell to the bottom of his class. In 1747, along with four other undergraduates, he was expelled for a riot in which they attempted to storm the Marshalsea Prison. He graduated in 1749 as a Bachelor of Arts, but without the discipline or distinction that might have gained him entry to a profession in the church or the law. His education seemed to have given him mainly a taste for fine clothes, cards, singing Irish airs, and playing the flute. He lived for a short time with his mother, tried various professions without success, studied medicine desultorily at the University of Edinburgh from 1752 to 1755, and set out on a walking tour of Flanders, France, Switzerland, and Northern Italy, living by his wits (busking with his flute).

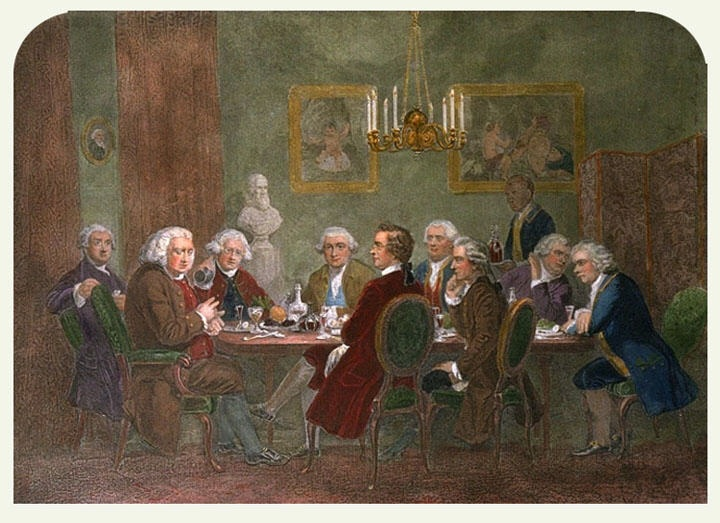
A literary party at Sir Joshua Reynolds's. Left to right: James Boswell, Samuel Johnson, Joshua Reynolds, David Garrick, Edmund Burke, Pasquale Paoli, Charles Burney, a servant (possibly Francis Barber), Thomas Warton, Oliver Goldsmith. (select a detail of the image for more information)

== Career ==
He settled in London in 1756, where he briefly held various jobs, including an apothecary's assistant and an usher at a school. Perennially in debt and addicted to gambling, Goldsmith produced a massive output as a hack writer on Grub Street for the publishers of London, but his few painstaking works earned him the company of Samuel Johnson, with whom he was a founding member of "The Club". There, through fellow Club member Edmund Burke, he made the acquaintance of Sir George Savile, who would later arrange a job for him at Thornhill Grammar School in Yorkshire. The combination of his literary work and his dissolute lifestyle led Horace Walpole to give him the epithet "inspired idiot". During this period, he used the pseudonym "James Willington" (the name of a fellow student at Trinity) to publish his 1758 translation of the autobiography of the Huguenot Jean Marteilhe.

=== Works ===
==== The Present State of Polite Learning in Europe ====
Published in 1759, this essay surveys the condition of letters and education in contemporary Europe and critiques the commercial pressures shaping the literary marketplace. Scholars have noted close parallels with James Ralph’s 1758 pamphlet The Case of Authors by Profession or Trade, Stated—particularly on contempt for paid authorship, theatrical gatekeeping, and writers’ dependence on booksellers—and suggest the two writers may have discussed such matters while both were associated with The Monthly Review.

==== The Citizen of the World ====
In 1760, Goldsmith began to publish a series of letters in the Public Ledger under the title The Citizen of the World, which brought him fame. Purportedly written by a Chinese traveller in England by the name of Lien Chi, they used this fictional outsider's perspective to comment ironically and at times moralistically on British society and manners. It was inspired by the earlier essay series, Persian Letters by Montesquieu.

==== The Hermit ====
Goldsmith wrote this 160-line romantic ballad in 1765. The hero and heroine are Edwin, a youth without wealth or power, and Angelina, the daughter of a lord "beside the Tyne". Angelina spurns many wooers but refuses to make plain her love for young Edwin. "Quite dejected with my scorn", Edwin disappears and becomes a hermit. One day, Angelina turns up at his cell in a boy's clothes and, not recognising him, tells him her story. Edwin then reveals his true identity, and the lovers never part again. The poem is notable for its interesting portrayal of a hermit, who is fond of the natural world and his wilderness solitude but maintains a gentle, sympathetic demeanour toward other people. In keeping with eremitical tradition, however, Edwin the Hermit claims to "spurn the [opposite] sex". This poem appears under the title of "A Ballad" sung by the character of Mr. Burchell in Chapter 8 of Goldsmith's novel, The Vicar of Wakefield.

==== The Vicar of Wakefield ====
This classic novel, published in 1766, tells the story of a devout and benevolent vicar, Charles Primrose, and his family, who are reduced to poverty and prison. Dr. Primrose serves as the narrator. The novel includes an aristocratic villain, impersonation, abduction, and betrayal while exploring themes of faith, humility, social class, and the importance of family and community.

==== The Deserted Village ====
In the 1760s, Goldsmith witnessed the demolition of an ancient village and the destruction of its farms to clear land to become a wealthy man's garden. His poem The Deserted Village, published in 1770, expresses a fear that the destruction of villages and the conversion of land from productive agriculture to ornamental landscape gardens would ruin the peasantry.

==== She Stoops to Conquer ====
The satirical play, "She Stoops to Conquer", was first performed in 1773. It is a story of love, mistaken identities, and social etiquette, known for its wit, class-based satire, and enduring characters. It is still regularly performed and has been adapted for film and television.

==== Other works ====
- Account of the Augustan Age in England (1759)
- The Life of Richard Nash (Beau Nash) (1762)
- The History of England, from the Earliest Times to the Death of George II in 4 volumes (1771)
  - Vol. I (Digital version)
  - Vol. II (Digital version)
  - Vol. III (Digital version)
- Dr. Goldsmith's Roman History Abridged by Himself for the Use of Schools (1772)
- An History of the Earth and Animated Nature in 8 volumes (1774)
  - Vol. I (Digitale versie)
  - Vol. II (Digitale versie)
  - Vol. III (Digitale versie)
  - Vol IV (Digitale versie)
  - Vol. V (Digitale versie)
  - Vol. VI (Digitale versie)
  - Vol. VII (Digitale versie)
  - Vol. VIII (Digitale versie)
- The Comic Romance of Monsieur Scarron in 2 vols., published posthumously (1775). Translation from the French of Le Roman Comique (1651–57), by Paul Scarron
- The Complete Poetical Works of Oliver Goldsmith (1887), edited by Austin Dobson
- The Poems and Plays of Oliver Goldsmith (Frederick Warne and Co., 1889)
- The Grumbler: An Adaptation (1931), edited by Alice I. Perry Wood

Goldsmith has sometimes been credited with writing the classic children's tale The History of Little Goody Two-Shoes, though this cannot be proved.

== Personal life ==
In his Life, Washington Irving states that Goldsmith was between 5'4" and 5'6" in height, not heavily built but quite muscular and with rather plain features. In character, he had a lively sense of fun, was totally guileless, and never happier than when in the light-hearted company of children. The money that he sporadically earned was often frittered away or happily given away to the next good cause that presented itself so that any financial security tended to be fleeting and short-lived. Goldsmith's talents were unreservedly recognised by Samuel Johnson, whose patronage – somewhat resented by Boswell – aided his eventual recognition in the literary world and the world of drama.

Goldsmith was described by contemporaries as prone to envy, a congenial but impetuous and disorganised personality who once planned to emigrate to America but failed because he missed his ship. At some point around this time, he worked at Thornhill Grammar School, later basing Squire Thornhill (in The Vicar of Wakefield) on his benefactor Sir George Savile and certainly spending time with eminent scientist Rev. John Mitchell, whom he probably knew from London. Mitchell sorely missed good company, which Goldsmith naturally provided in spades. Thomas De Quincey wrote of him "All the motion of Goldsmith's nature moved in the direction of the true, the natural, the sweet, the gentle".

Later researchers have speculated that Goldsmith may have suffered from colour blindness, a condition which was not described until years after Goldsmith's death. Munro MacLennan described several instances from Goldsmith's life which suggest that he had an inability to distinguish between certain colours.

=== Religious beliefs ===
Goldsmith was an Anglican, and famously said "as I take my shoes from the shoemaker, and my coat from the taylor, so I take my religion from the priest".

Thomas Hurst wrote that Goldsmith "recognised with joy the existence and perfections of a Deity. For the Christian revelation also, he was always understood to have a profound respect – knowing that it was the source of our best hopes and noblest expectations."

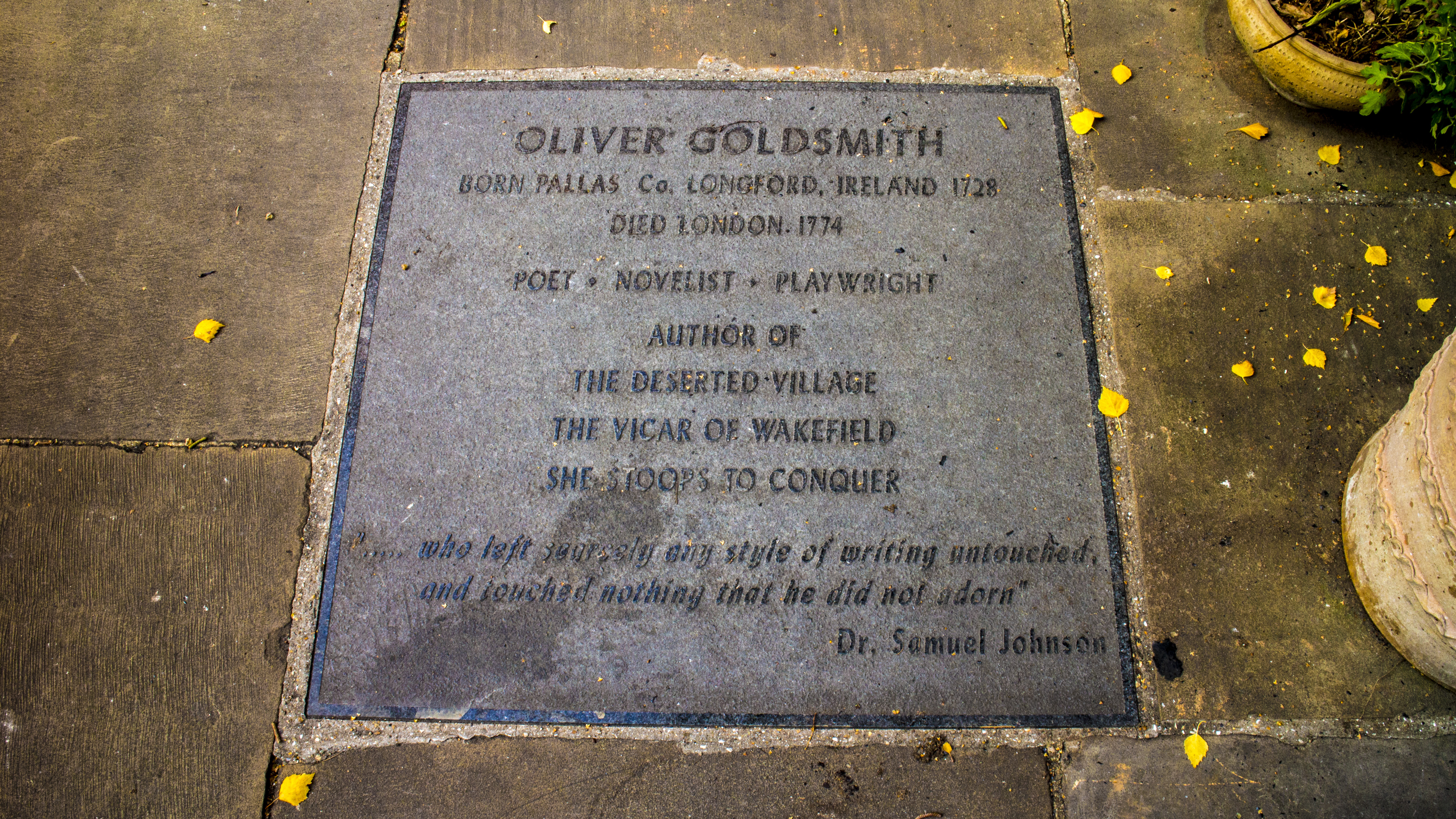
A plaque to Oliver Goldsmith at the Temple Church in London, where he was buried.

== Death ==
Goldsmith's premature death in 1774 may have been partly due to his own misdiagnosis of a kidney infection. He was buried in Temple Church in London. The inscription reads; "HERE LIES/OLIVER GOLDSMITH". A monument was originally raised for him at the site of his burial, but it was destroyed in an air raid in 1941. A monument to him survives in the centre of Ballymahon, also in Westminster Abbey with an epitaph written by Samuel Johnson.

"Oliver Goldsmith: A Poet, Naturalist, and Historian, who left scarcely any style of writing untouched, and touched nothing that he did not adorn. Of all the passions, whether smiles were to move or tears, a powerful yet gentle master. In genius, vivid, versatile, sublime. In style, clear, elevated, elegant." Epitaph written by Dr. Johnson, translated from the original Latin.

== Legacy ==
Goldsmith is regarded as one of the most versatile writers of the Georgian era, who contributed to the development of sentimentalism in English literature in 18th-century Great Britain, and his plays are considered second in importance only to those of William Shakespeare. Among his papers was found the prospectus of an encyclopedia, to be called the Universal dictionary of the arts and sciences. He wished this to be the British equivalent of the Encyclopédie and it was to include comprehensive articles by Samuel Johnson, Edmund Burke, Adam Smith, Edward Gibbon, Sir Joshua Reynolds, Sir William Jones, Fox and Dr. Burney. The project, however, was not realised due to Goldsmith's death. His work influenced several English authors of the 19th century, including Charles Dickens, Jane Austen, and Mary Shelley, who mentioned his fictional characters in their own novels.

A new Royal National Lifeboat Institution (RNLI) lifeboat was provided to Ballycotton Lifeboat Station in 1880. The 34-foot-long (10 m) boat was gifted by Miss Ada Goldsmith Tulloh of West Malvern, who established a lifeboat fund, in order to pay tribute to her famous ancestor. "I confidently put forth this appeal, not only in virtue of the Life-boat's noble mission and memorable services, but feeling sure that all who have read with pleasure ' The Vicar of Wakefield,' 'The Traveller,' and 'The Deserted Village,' will not fail in helping me to further this good work". At a ceremony held on Thursday 29 July 1880, the lifeboat, which cost £329, was named Oliver Goldsmith. In her 11 years on service, the boat would launch five times, and save 21 lives.

=== Memorials concerning Oliver Goldsmith ===
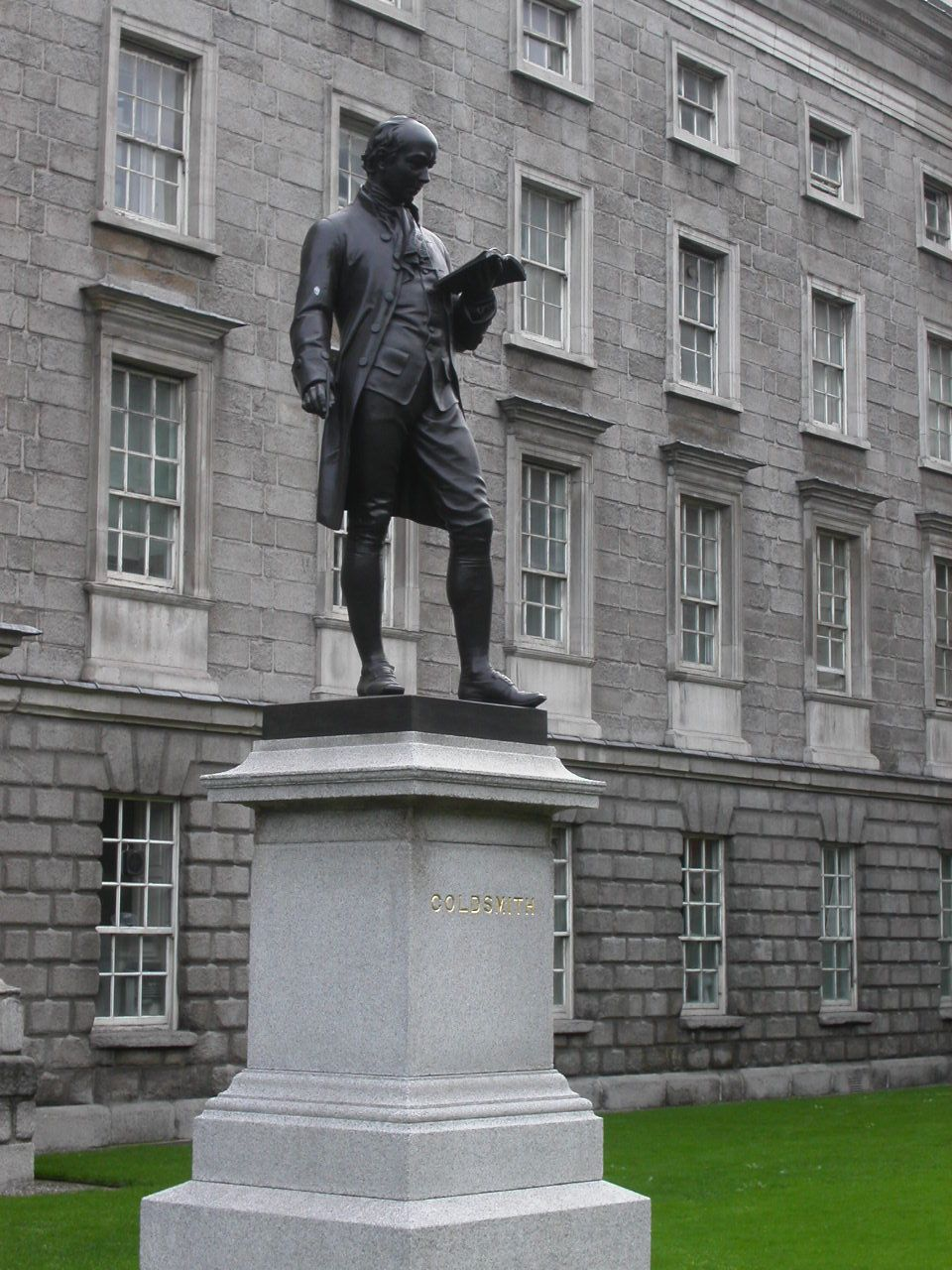
A statue of Goldsmith at Trinity College Dublin

- Goldsmith lived in Kingsbury, now in north-west London, between 1771 and 1774: Oliver Goldsmith Primary School, Goldsmith Lane, and Goldsmith Avenue there are named after him.
- Goldsmith Road, the Oliver Goldsmith Estate and Oliver Goldsmith Primary School, all in Peckham, are named after him.
- The Oliver Goldsmith Summer School is held every June Bank Holiday at Ballymahon with poetry and creative readings being held at Goldsmith's birthplace in nearby Pallas, Forgney.
- A statue of him by J. H. Foley stands at the Front Arch of Trinity College Dublin (see image).
- A statue of him stands in a limestone cell at the ruin of his birthplace in Pallas, Forgney, Ballymahon, County Longford. The statue is a copy of the Foley statue that stands outside Trinity College Dublin and is the focus point of the annual Oliver Goldsmith Summer School.
- There is a statue in Ballymahon County Longford outside the town library by Irish Sculptor Éamonn O'Doherty (1939–2011) which was unveiled in 1999.
- His name has been given to a new lecture theatre and student accommodation on the Trinity College campus: Goldsmith Hall.
- Auburn, Alabama, and Auburn University were named for the fictional town of Auburn from his poem The Deserted Village referred to in the first line: "Sweet Auburn, loveliest village of the plain." Auburn is still referred to as the 'loveliest village on the plain.'
- Auburn in Sydney, Australia was also named for "Sweet Auburn".
- Auburn Hill in Stoneybatter, Dublin is also named after the fictional town of Auburn.
- London Underground locomotive number 16 (used on the Metropolitan line of the London Underground until 1962) was named Oliver Goldsmith.
- Athlone Institute of Technology library is named the Goldsmith Library
- In 1870, Goldsmith Street in Phibsborough was renamed after Oliver Goldsmith
- Goldsmith Street in the 'Poets' Corner' area of Elwood, Melbourne is named after Oliver Goldsmith.

== In popular culture ==
His life was dramatised in the 1940 Australian radio play A Citizen of the World.

Two characters in the 1951 comedy The Lavender Hill Mob quote the same line from Goldsmith's poem The Traveller – a subtle joke, because the film's plot involves the recasting of stolen gold.

During the opening credits of the Sky One adaptation of Sir Terry Pratchett's Christmas-like story "The Hogfather", a portrait of Goldsmith is shown as part of a hall of memorials to those "inhumed" by the "Ankh-Morpork Assassins' Guild".

In the 1925 novel The Painted Veil by W. Somerset Maugham, the last words of the poem An Elegy on the Death of a Mad Dog, "The dog it was that died", are the dying words of bacteriologist Walter Fane, one of the primary characters in the novel. And using the title "Elegy for a Mad Dog" is an episode of Marcus Welby, M.D. (1971, Season 2, Episode 21).

The Tom Stoppard play The Dog It Was That Died takes its title from the same poem.

In the Nabokov novel Pale Fire, a central character's house is situated between "Goldsworth" (the name of an estate) and "Wordsmith University". Crossing these two names yields the names of the poets Wordsworth and Goldsmith; one of the narrators refers to this as the "witty exchange of syllables invoking the two masters of the heroic couplet."

In the play Marx in Soho by Howard Zinn, Marx makes a reference to Goldsmith's poem The Deserted Village.

In The Waste Land, T. S. Eliot parodies Goldsmith's song When lovely woman stoops to folly.

The characters of 'Edwin' and 'Angelina' in Gilbert and Sullivan's Trial by Jury were a reference to Goldsmith's poem The Hermit.
