= Three Mile Cross (radio play) =

1940 radio play by Catherine Shepherd

- Genre: drama play
- Running time: 45 mins (8:00 pm – 8:45 pm)
- Country of origin: Australia
- Language: English
- Hosted by: ABC
- Written by: Catherine Shepherd
- Directed by: John Cairns
- Original release: 14 January 1940

Three Mile Cross is a 1940 Australian radio play by Catherine Shepherd about Mary Mitford.

The ABC bought it in 1939. It was produced again in 1941 and 1948.

According to Leslie Rees the play "presented the writer divided in loyalty between claims of family and work — frustrated through the need for maintaining her father and yet making a success by using the simple material around her, as in Our Village."

== Premise ==
According to Wireless Weekly the play "chiefly tells of the firm and unfaltering devotion of Mary to her father in spite of his having 'busted' £20,000 won by her in a lottery, and several times brought his family to ruin, so that Mary had to keep the house going by working incessantly at her books, only breaking off to read her father the sporting newspapers."
