= Down to Earth (radio play) =

1939 radio play by Catherine Shepherd

Wireless Weekly 13 December 1941

Down to Earth is a 1939 Australian radio play by Catherine Shepherd.

The play was produced again in 1941.

Leslie Rees said "Miss Shepherd’s detail is based on careful, wise observation."

== Premise ==
The stories of various couples on board a ship.
