= The Catholic Advocate =

Newspaper published in Brisbane, Australia

- Type: Weekly newspaper
- Format: Tabloid
- Owner: William Luke O'Dwyer
- Founder: William Luke O'Dwyer
- Publisher: Hibernian Newspaper Company
- General manager: William Luke O'Dwyer
- Staff writers: Ernestine Hill
- Founded: June 17, 1911
- Ceased publication: March 31, 1938
- Language: English
- City: Brisbane, Queensland
- Country: Australia
- Website: trove.nla.gov.au/newspaper/title/1578

The Catholic Advocate was a newspaper published in Brisbane, Queensland, Australia from 1911 to 1938.

== History ==
The newspaper was published from 1911 to 1938 by William Luke O'Dwyer and it published the early poetry of Ernestine Hill, from the age of 14, on its children's pages.
