= The Valiant Tinker =

1939 radio play by Catherine Shepherd

- Wireless Weekly 11 November 1939
- Genre: drama play
- Running time: 60 mins
- Country of origin: Australia
- Language: English
- Hosted by: ABC
- Written by: Catherine Shepherd
- Original release: 12 November 1939

The Valiant Tinker is a 1939 Australian radio play by Catherine Shepherd about John Bunyan. The play was popular and was performed again in 1941 and 1950.

The play was one of Shepherd's key works.

According to Leslie Rees the play "demonstrated the political and religious pressure the writer may meet when he writes his mind, and how he must resist it. There are no heroics about Bunyan in this play, he quietly prefers prison to blinkers, there is a quality of peaceful certainty in him, he knows what he must do."

== Premise ==
"Bunyan had no education and could not even spell, but managed to write a book which has lasted two and a half centuries and has been read by millions... “The Pilgrim’s Progress.” He had no help in writing the book; indeed, he wrote it in gaol. He knew nothing of English literature and had no suspicion that he was turning out a masterpiece. The resulting allegory, though essentially a record of Christian's spiritual experience, has delighted so many adventure-loving readers that Christian has been compared with Jack the Giant-killer. Miss Shepherd tells how the “valiant tinker” was converted by a strange happening in an inn from his “sins” of dancing upon the green, playing tip-cat, and ringing the bells of the church steeple. The story shows Bunyan's intense examination of his own inward life, his being visited by “Angels of Light and Darkness.” his determination to be a preacher, his insistence on freedom of speech—“l say there’s no freedom except a man may think as his conscience directs him and speak out boldly the thought in his mind” —his incarceration for refusal to curb his opinions, and decision to write “The Pilgrim’s Progress”."
