= Charles Sturt =

Australian explorer (1795–1869)

The Honourable Charles Sturt
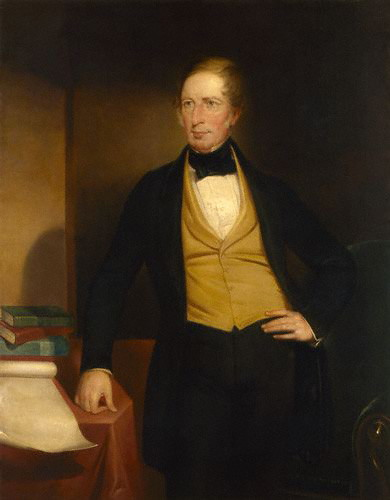
- In 1853

Surveyor General of South Australia
- In office 1 February 1839 – 4 October 1839
- Preceded by: George Ormsby
- Succeeded by: Edward Charles Frome

Personal details
- Born: 28 April 1795 Bengal Presidency
- Died: 16 June 1869 (aged 74) Cheltenham, Gloucestershire, England
- Spouse(s): Charlotte, Lady Sturt
- Occupation: Explorer of Australia, Colonial Administrator, Grazier, Naturalist

Charles Napier Sturt (28 April 1795 – 16 June 1869) was a British officer and explorer of Australia, and part of the European exploration of Australia. He led several expeditions into the interior of the continent, starting from Sydney and later from Adelaide. His expeditions traced several of the westward-flowing rivers, establishing that they all merged into the Murray River, which flows into the Southern Ocean. He was searching to prove his own passionately held belief that an "inland sea" was located at the centre of the continent. He reached the rank of Captain, served in several appointed posts, and on the Legislative Council.

Born to British parents in the Bengal Presidency, Sturt was educated in England for a time as a child and youth. He was placed in the British Army because his father was not wealthy enough to pay for Cambridge. After assignments in North America, Sturt was assigned to accompany a ship of convicts to Australia in 1827. Finding the place to his liking, he made his life there.

== Early life ==
Charles Sturt was born in the Bengal Presidency, the eldest son (of thirteen children) of Thomas Lenox Napier Sturt, a judge under the British East India Company, and his wife. His grandfather was Humphrey Sturt, and his uncle was the MP Charles Sturt. At the age of five, Charles was sent to live with relatives in England to be educated, as was customary for the children of the colonial upper class. After attending a preparatory school, he was sent to Harrow in 1810.

In 1812, Charles went to read with a Mr. Preston near Cambridge, but his father was not wealthy, and had difficulty finding the money to send him to Cambridge University, or to establish him in a profession. An aunt appealed to the Prince Regent and, on 9 September 1813, Sturt was gazetted as an ensign with the 39th (Dorsetshire) Regiment of Foot in the British Army.

Sturt saw action with the Duke of Wellington in the Peninsular War and against the Americans in Canada during the War of 1812. He returned to Europe a few days after the Battle of Waterloo. Sturt was gazetted lieutenant on 7 April 1823 and promoted captain on 15 December 1825. With a detachment from his regiment, Sturt escorted convicts aboard the Mariner to New South Wales, arriving in Sydney on 23 May 1827.

Sturt was a cousin of the wife of Henry Dumaresq, brother-in-law of Governor Ralph Darling, which was later to complicate his relationship with Sir Thomas Mitchell, who resented those whom he judged were treated favourably by Darling.

== Australia and Sturt's first two expeditions ==
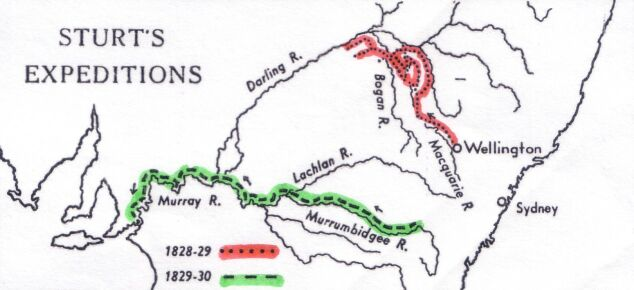
Sturt's first two river expeditions (1828-1830)

Sturt found the conditions and climate in New South Wales much better than he expected, and he developed a great interest in the country. The Governor of New South Wales, Sir Ralph Darling, formed a high opinion of Sturt and appointed him major of brigade and military secretary. Sturt became friendly with John Oxley, Allan Cunningham, Hamilton Hume, and other explorers. Sturt was keen to explore the Australian interior, especially its rivers.

Sturt received approval from Governor Darling on 4 November 1828 to explore the area of the Macquarie River in western New South Wales. It was not, however, until 10 November that the party started out. It consisted of Sturt, his servant Joseph Harris, three soldiers and eight convicts; on 27 November Sturt was joined by Hamilton Hume as his first assistant. Hume's experience proved to be very useful. A week was spent at Wellington Valley breaking in oxen and horses, and on 7 December the real start into comparatively little known country was made. 1828–29 was a period of drought and the party had difficulty in finding sufficient water. They had followed the courses of the Macquarie, Bogan and Castlereagh rivers and, though its importance was scarcely sufficiently realised, had visited the Darling River. The party returned to Wellington Valley on 21 April 1829. The expedition proved that northern New South Wales was not an inland sea, but deepened the mystery of where the western-flowing rivers of New South Wales went.

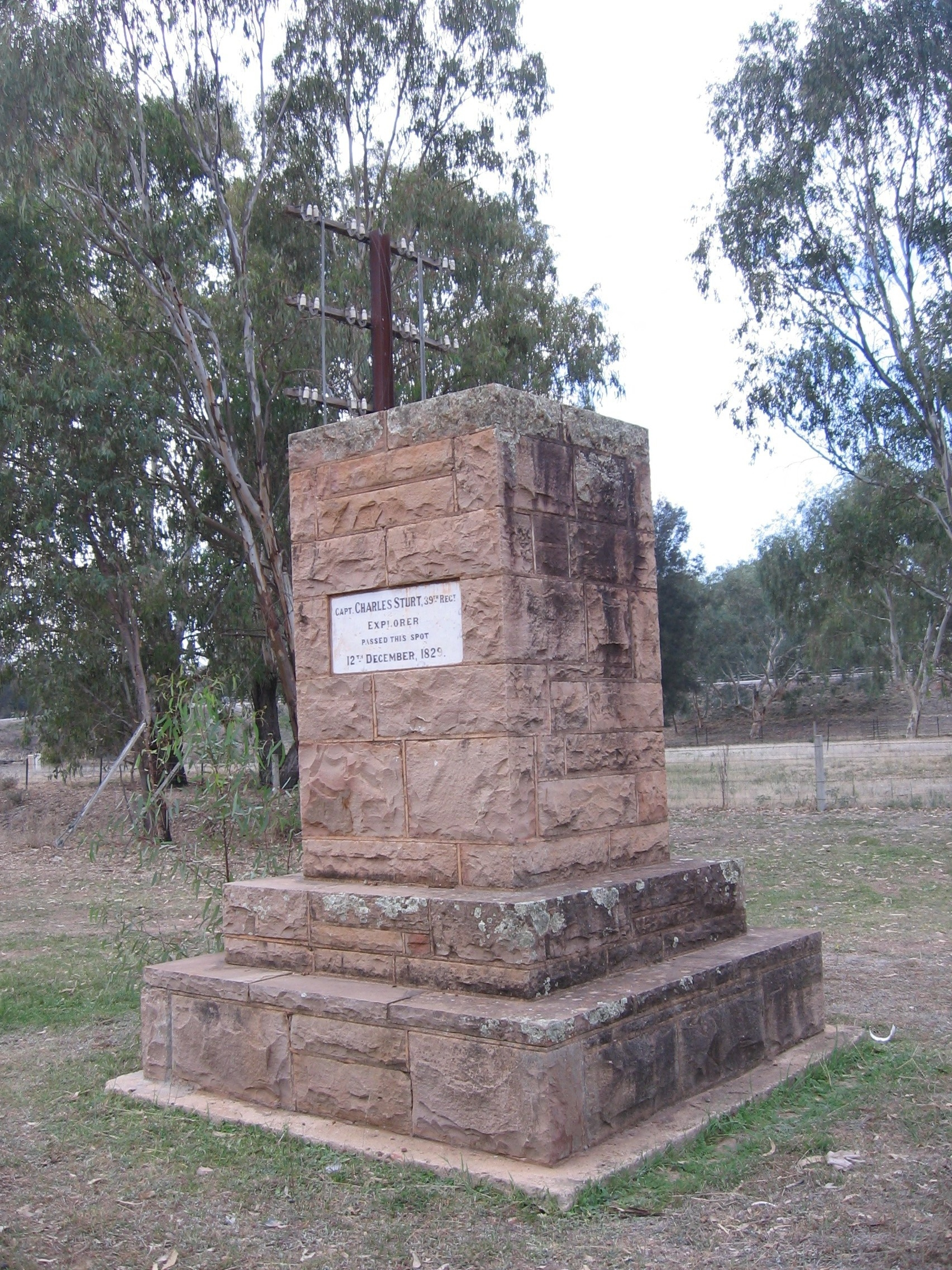
Sturt memorial at Narrandera, New South Wales on the Murrumbidgee River

In 1829 Governor Darling approved an expedition to solve this mystery. Sturt proposed to travel down the Murrumbidgee River, whose upper reaches had been seen by the Hume and Hovell expedition. In place of Hume, who was unable to join the party, George Macleay went "as a companion rather than as an assistant". A whaleboat built in sections was carried with them; it was assembled, and on 7 January 1830 they began their eventful voyage down the Murrumbidgee. In January 1830 Sturt's party reached the confluence of the Murrumbidgee and a much larger river, which Sturt named the Murray River. It was in fact the same river which Hume and Hovell had crossed further upstream and named the Hume. Several times the party was in danger from Aboriginals but Sturt always succeeded in propitiating them.

Sturt proceeded down the Murray, until he reached the river's confluence with the Darling. Sturt had now proved that all the western-flowing rivers eventually flow into the Murray. In February 1830, the party reached a large lake, which Sturt called Lake Alexandrina. A few days later, they reached the sea, later named as the Southern Ocean. There they made the disappointing discovery that the mouth of the Murray was a maze of lagoons and sandbars, impassable to shipping.

The party faced the ordeal of rowing back upriver on the Murray and Murrumbidgee, against the current, in the heat of an Australian summer. Their supplies ran out and, when they reached the site of Narrandera in April, they were unable to go any further. Sturt sent two men overland in search of supplies and they returned in time to save the party from starvation. But Sturt went blind for some months and never fully recovered his health. By the time they reached Sydney again, they had rowed and sailed nearly 2,900 kilometres of the river system.

== A break from exploring ==
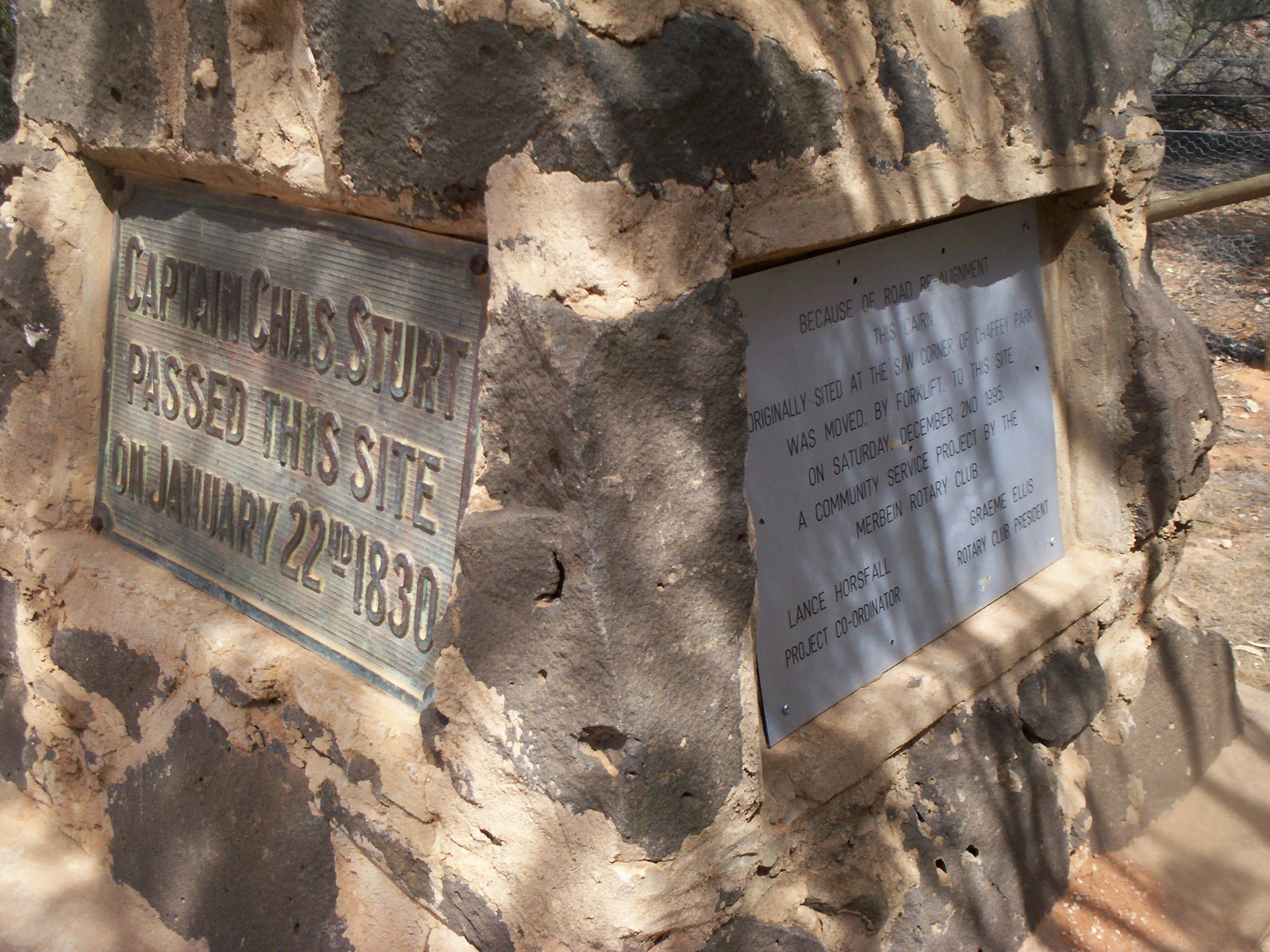
Charles Sturt monument in Merbein, Victoria

Sturt briefly served as Commander on Norfolk Island, where mutiny was brewing among the convicts. Because of his ill health, he went to England in 1832 on sick leave, arriving there almost completely blind. In 1833 he published his Two Expeditions into the Interior of Southern Australia during the years 1828, 1829, 1830 and 1831, of which a second edition appeared in 1834. For the first time the public in England realised the importance of Sturt's work. Governor Darling's somewhat tardy but appreciative dispatch of 14 April 1831, and his request for Sturt's promotion, had had no result. Sir Richard Bourke, who had succeeded Darling, was also unsuccessful in persuading Viscount Goderich to give "this deserving officer your Lordship's protection and support". Though the colonial office did not seem to recognise the value of Sturt's work, publication of his book was important because it captured the attention of Edward Gibbon Wakefield, who read it. He chose South Australia for a new settlement then being contemplated by the government. In May 1834, based on his services, Sturt applied for a grant of land in Australia, intending to settle on it.

In July instructions were given that he was to receive a grant of 5,000 acres (2,000 ha); in exchange, Sturt agreed to give up his pension rights. On 20 September 1834, Sturt married Charlotte Christiana Greene, daughter of a longtime family friend. Soon afterward, the couple sailed for Australia.

== Return to Australia and disappearance and likely death of Henry Bryan ==
Sturt returned to Australia in mid-1835 to begin farming on his own 20 square kilometres (4,900 acres) of land, granted to him by the New South Wales government on the lower reaches of Ginninderra Creek, near present-day Canberra. (Sturt named the property 'Belconnen', a name now applied to the nearby population centre.) In 1838 he, with Giles Strangways, a Mr McLeod, and Captain John Finnis, herded cattle overland from Sydney to Adelaide, on the way proving that the Hume and the Murray were the same river.

In September 1838, Sturt led an expedition to the mouth of the Murray, which settled all dispute as to the suitability of Adelaide for the colony's capital. After returning to NSW to settle his affairs, Sturt settled at what is now Grange, South Australia in early 1839; he was appointed Surveyor General of South Australia and a member of the South Australian Legislative Council. When the London-appointed Surveyor-General Edward Frome unexpectedly arrived, Sturt had to step down. Sturt served briefly as the Registrar-General, but he soon proposed a major expedition into the interior of Australia as a way of restoring his reputation in the colony and London.

In November–December 1839, Sturt and his wife accompanied the Governor of South Australia George Gawler, Julia Gawler (his daughter), Henry Inman and a support crew on an expedition up the Murray River, returning to Adelaide overland; Julia Gawler, Charlotte Sturt and Charlotte's maidservant Eliza Arbuckle became the first white women to travel the Murray.

The men of the party headed northwest from the river towards what is now Mount Bryan on 11 December. Two days later, while riding in very hot weather with their water supply dwindling, both the men and horses were suffering. During the return journey to the river, Henry Bryan's horse was slow, and was lagging behind the main group. When a dust storm occurred, Bryan became lost, was separated from his horse, and most likely died. His body was never recovered, although a massive search was conducted over eight days to find him. Governor Gawler and the remainder of the party reached Adelaide on 28 December 1839. No trace of Bryan was ever found but according to one commentator, his horse returned to Adelaide several months later.

In September 1841, Sturt chaired a Bench of Magistrates that conducted an official inquiry into the circumstances of the Rufus River massacre. The inquiry concluded "that the conduct of Mr. Moorhouse and his party was justifiable, and indeed unavoidable in their circumstances".

== Exploring from Adelaide, Sturt's third and final expedition ==
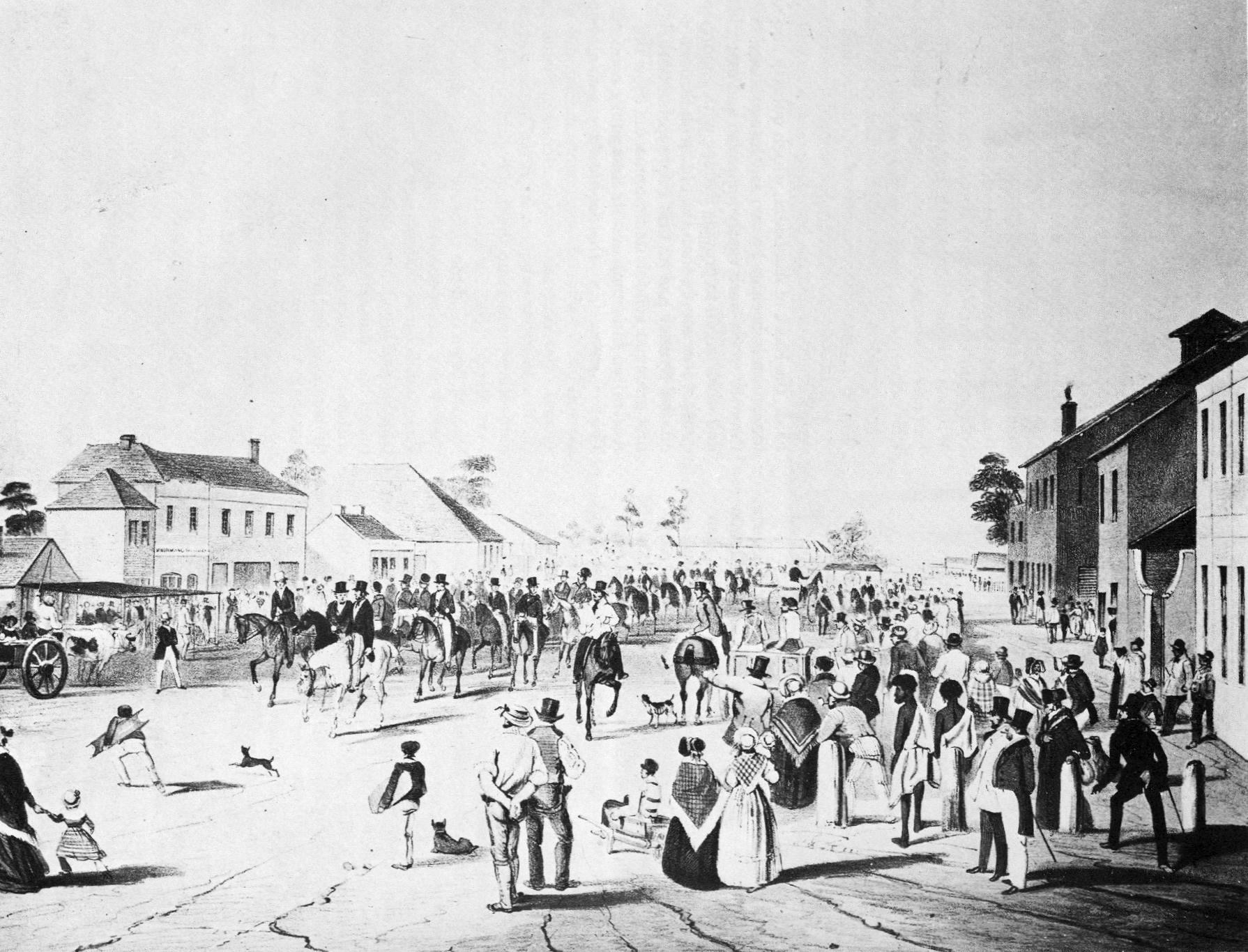
Sturt leaving Adelaide in 1844

Sturt believed that it was his destiny to discover a great saltwater lake, known as 'the inland sea', in the middle of Australia. At very least, he wanted to be the first explorer to plant his foot in 'the centre' of Australia. In August 1844, he set out with a party of 15 men, 200 sheep, six drays, and a boat to explore north-western New South Wales and to advance into central Australia. They travelled along the Murray and Darling rivers before being guided past the future site of Broken Hill by a local Indigenous teenager named Topar. They were stranded for months by the extreme summer conditions near the present site of Milparinka.

When the rains eventually came, Sturt moved north and established a depot at Fort Grey (today this site is within Sturt National Park). With a small group of men, including explorer John McDouall Stuart as his draughtsman, Sturt pressed on across what is now known as Sturt's Stony Desert and into the Simpson Desert. Unable to go further, he turned back to the depot. Sturt made a second attempt to reach the centre of Australia, but he developed scurvy in the extreme conditions. His health broke down and he was forced to abandon the attempt. John Harris Browne, surgeon on the expedition, assisted Sturt, took over leadership of the party and, after travelling a total of 3,000 miles (4,800 km), brought it back to safety.

== Later life ==
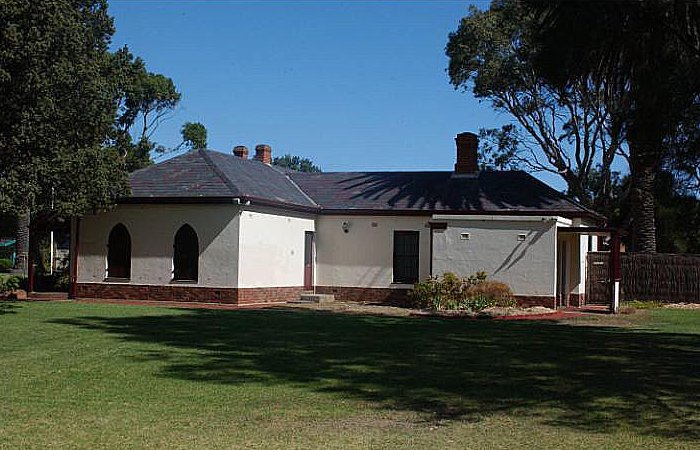
The Grange, Sturt's cottage, located in the Adelaide suburb of Grange

Early in 1847 Sturt went to England on leave. He arrived in October and was presented with the Royal Geographical Society's Founder's Medal. He prepared his Narrative of an Expedition into Central Australia for publication; however, it was not published until early in 1849. Throughout this time he was suffering again with poor eyesight.

Sturt returned to Adelaide with his family, arriving in August 1849. He was immediately appointed Colonial Secretary with a seat in the legislative council. There was no lack of work in the ensuing years. Roads were constructed, and navigation on the Murray was encouraged. However Sturt had renewed trouble with his eyes, which limited his ability to perform these duties. On 30 December 1851, he resigned from both positions and was given a pension of £600 a year. He settled on 200 hectares (490 acres) of land close to Adelaide and the sea. But the gold discoveries had increased the cost of living there. On 19 March 1853 Sturt and his family sailed for England. Sturt lived at Cheltenham and devoted himself to the education of his children.

In 1855 Sturt applied unsuccessfully for the positions of Governor of Victoria and in 1858 for Governor of Queensland. Sturt's age, uncertain health, and comparatively small income were against him. By 1860 Sturt's three sons were all serving in the army. The remainder of his family went to live at Dinan to economise after the expenses of education and fitting out. But they found the town to be unhealthy and in 1863 returned to Cheltenham. In 1864 Sturt suffered great grief in the death of one of his sons in India.

In March 1869 Sturt attended the inaugural dinner of the Colonial Society, at which Lord Granville mentioned that it was the intention of the government to extend the Order of St Michael and St George to the colonies. Sturt was persuaded by his friends to apply for a knighthood (KCMG), but afterwards regretted he had done so, when he heard there were innumerable applications; however as Sturt died before his investiture, he never received the honour.

Sturt's health had been very variable and on 16 June 1869, he died suddenly. He was survived by his widow, Charlotte, two sons, Colonel Napier George Sturt, and Major-General Charles Sheppey Sturt, and daughter Charlotte. Mrs Sturt was granted a civil list pension of £80 a year, and the queen granted her the title of Lady Sturt, as though her husband's knighthood had been gazetted. Reproductions of portraits of Sturt by Crossland and Koberwein were published in his biography, called Life, written by his daughter-in-law, Mrs N. G. Sturt.

Sturt's life is summarised in the Australian Dictionary of Biography as follows:

Although Sturt probably entered his career as an explorer through influence, his selection was justified by results. He was a careful and accurate observer and an intelligent interpreter of what he saw, and it was unfortunate that much of his work revealed nothing but desolation. He prided himself with some justice on his impeccable treatment of the Aboriginals, and earned the respect and liking of his men by his courtesy and care for their well-being. Indeed his capacity for arousing and retaining affection was remarkable; it made him an ideal family man but a failure in public life. Without toughness and egocentricity to balance his poor judgment and business capacity he had little chance of success in colonial politics. In this sphere, he might well be described as a born loser. He remained throughout his life an English Tory gentleman with an unshakeable faith in God.

Sturt is buried in Cheltenham Cemetery, Gloucestershire.

== Legacy ==
Sturt is commemorated by:

- Sturt National Park in north-western New South Wales
- the City of Charles Sturt in Adelaide's western suburbs and its associated tennis tournament;
- the southern Adelaide suburb of Sturt;
- the Sturt Football Club, a South Australian National Football League club based in the suburb of Unley, South Australia;
- the Sturt River, which flows through the Sturt Gorge Recreation Park, in the southern suburb of Adelaide
  (a rock formation in the gorge, the Sturt Tillite, has given its name to the Sturtian glaciation)
- the electoral Division of Sturt in Adelaide's eastern suburbs;
- Charles Sturt University in regional New South Wales;
- the Sturt Highway from Wagga Wagga to Adelaide;
- Sturt Avenue, between the Canberra suburbs of Griffith and Narrabundah;
- the Captain Sturt Hotel in Wentworth, New South Wales;
- Sturt's desert pea;
- Sturt's desert rose;
- Sturt Stony Desert;
- TS Sturt – a Training Ship of the Australian Navy Cadets
- Napier Grove and Murray Grove in Hoxton, London N1, near Sturt St.
- the radio play The Heroic Journey (1944) by Catherine Shepherd
- the radio play Lure of the Inland Sea (1945) by Dymphna Cusack
- the documentary film Inland with Sturt (1951)

The Charles Sturt Museum is based in Sturt's former home "The Grange", in the Adelaide suburb of Grange. The museum illustrates his story with "not only ... displays of relics, but interpretive and multimedia displays".

The Australian-born American actor Rod Taylor, whose middle name is Sturt, was his great-great-grandnephew.

== See also ==
- Evelyn Pitfield Shirley Sturt
