= Ernestine Hill =

Australian journalist, travel writer and novelist

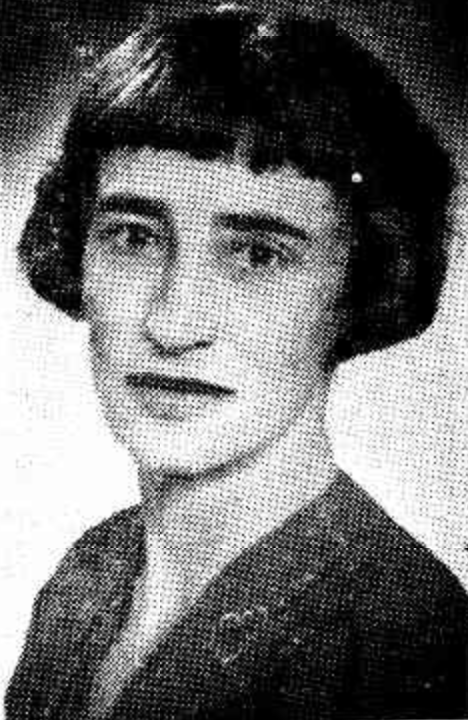
- Ernestine Hill, c.1942
- Born: Mary Ernestine Hemmings; 21 January 1899; Rockhampton, Queensland
- Died: 21 August 1972 (aged 73); Brisbane, Queensland
- Education: All Hallows' School, Brisbane
- Occupations: journalist, travel writer and novelist
- Children: 1 son

Ernestine Hill (born Mary Ernestine Hemmings, 21 January 1899 — 21 August 1972) was an Australian journalist, travel writer and novelist. Known for her various travels across Australia and her writings about the diverse landscapes and cultures in the country, she published books such as The Great Australian Loneliness in 1937 and The Territory in 1951. She also wrote a novel, My Love Must Wait, published in 1941.

== Life ==
Born Mary Ernestine Hemmings in Rockhampton, Queensland, she was the daughter of Robert Hemmings and Margaret "Magde" Foster-Lyman and they spent much of her early life moving up and down the coast, from Mackay to Thursday Island as they both had mobile professions; she was their only child.

Hill first attended school at a Catholic state school in Townsville before, following winning a bursary in the Queensland State School examination she was able to attend the more prestigious All Hallows' School in Brisbane as a boarder from 1910. Her father died in the same year.

While attending All Hallows', around 1914, Hill published her first poem in The Catholic Advocate and became a regular contributor to its children's page. In 1916 her poems where published as a volume, Peter Pan Land, and she was called a 'Queensland girl poet par excellence' and a 'genius unspoiled'. The proceeds from its sale were set aside to fund her studies in additional to her existing scholarship.

Following the completion of her schooling there she attended Stott & Hoare's Business College, Brisbane where she gained high passes in shorthand and typing skills. On completing her studies, she worked briefly in the public service (as a typist at the Department of Justice Library), and then for Smith's Weekly, Sydney, first as the secretary to the literary editor, J. F. Archibald, and later as a journalist and subeditor.

On 30 October 1924 her son Robert was born. Rumoured to be Robert Clyde Packer's son, who she met in her role at Smith's Weekly which he founded, although this has never been publicly acknowledged. Ernestine assumed the surname Hill after the birth to protect herself saying that her husband, Mr Hill, was either overseas or dead. Following Robert's birth she took a role with The Examiner (Tasmania) with family, including Hills mother, caring for him; this would continue for most of his young life and Hill had little choice but to do so as a single woman.

During the 1930s she travelled extensively around Australia, writing as she went, primarily for Associated Newspapers and she is recorded as having travelled to places such as the East Kimberley (a record of 'Mrs Hill' appears in an October 1930 diary entry of Michael Durack) and Port Hedland; Hill recalled of this time that many of the people she met during this period were: "unaccustomed to the ways of the new woman and deceived by my outback shirt and trousers"; she was often mistaken for a man. The articles she produced appeared in the Sydney Sun and syndicated to other major city newspapers. She also regularly published pictorial essays in Walkabout (magazine) and amassed a collection of over three thousand photographs in which she documenting the landscape and her encounters with Aboriginal people.

In 1931 her sensationalist reporting of the discovery of gold in The Granites, north-west of Alice Springs in the Northern Territory, contributed to a gold rush and a stock-market boom. This rush resulted in a major failure which left many prospectors stranded and destitute, and Hill was attacked for irresponsible journalism. This story is told, in detail, in Tragedy track: the story of The Granites by FE Baume (1933).

It is also during this period that Hill first formed a relationship with Daisy Bates, who she first camped with a Ooldea, South Australia in June 1932; their relationship became an ongoing one throughout the remainder of Bates' life. Together the produced a syndicated series of articles entitled 'My Natives and I', first published in The Advertiser (Adelaide) in 1936. They worked together closely and Hill later claimed to be mostly responsible as a ghost-writer for Bates' The Passing of the Aborigines, although this is a contentious issue. AustLit: The Australian Literature Resource claims that Bates eventually confirmed that Hill did ghost-write the book.

Hill then stopped travelling and worked for the ABC from 1940 from 1944, first as the editor of the ABC Weekly's women's pages (1940-1942) and then held the position of commissioner (1941-1944). Hill and her son were both pacifists and much of this war period was spent attempting to help Robert, who had already been conscripted, avoid war service. She lobbied directly to John Curtin for his conscription to be deferred as he was of invaluable assistance to her research and that her work was of 'outstanding value to Australia'. She also wrote to H. V. Evatt, the then Attorney-General of Australia, asking him to intervene. Despite their efforts Robert was ultimately forced to the Cowra recruit camp in May 1944 but was shortly after discharged as 'mentally unfit' in October 1944.

After resigning from the ABC, she resumed her travels, now with her son Robert by her side as a research assistant, but published little from her work during this period. The pair lived together as travellers in a caravan for many years.

She was awarded a Commonwealth Literary Fund fellowship in 1959. However, while this provided her with a small pension, her final years were characterised by financial and health problems and, in 1970, she returned to Brisbane to be cared for by her family and died in their care in 1972.

== Legacy ==
The majority of her writing, which comprised books as well as articles for newspapers and such journals as Walkabout, resulted from her wide travels across Australia. They recorded her adventures and focus on the Australian landscape. She could also be controversial.

She is best known for The Territory (1951). However, her only novel, My Love Must Wait (1941), a fictionalised biography of sailor and navigator Matthew Flinders, sold well overseas as well as in Australia.

Hill's portrait, painted in 1970 by Sam Fullbrook, is in the Queensland Art Gallery an image of this portrait is available through the National Archives of Australia.

== Works ==
=== Non-fiction ===
- The Great Australian Loneliness (London: 1937; Australia:1940)
- Water into Gold (1937)
- Australia: Land of Contrasts (1943)
- Flying Doctor Calling (1947)
- The Territory (1951)
- Kabbarli: A Personal Memoir of Daisy Bates (1973)

=== Fiction ===
- My Love Must Wait (1941)

=== Radio plays ===
- Santa Claus of Christmas Creek in Australian Radio Plays (1946)

== Works about ==
The following books have been written about Hill and her life:

- Van Velzen, Marianne (2016). The call of the outback: the remarkable story of Ernestine Hill, nomad, adventurer and trailblazer. Allen & Unwin.
- Hogan, Eleanor (2021). Into the loneliness : the unholy alliance of Ernestine Hill and Daisy Bates. NewSouth.

== See also ==
- Australian outback literature of the 20th century
