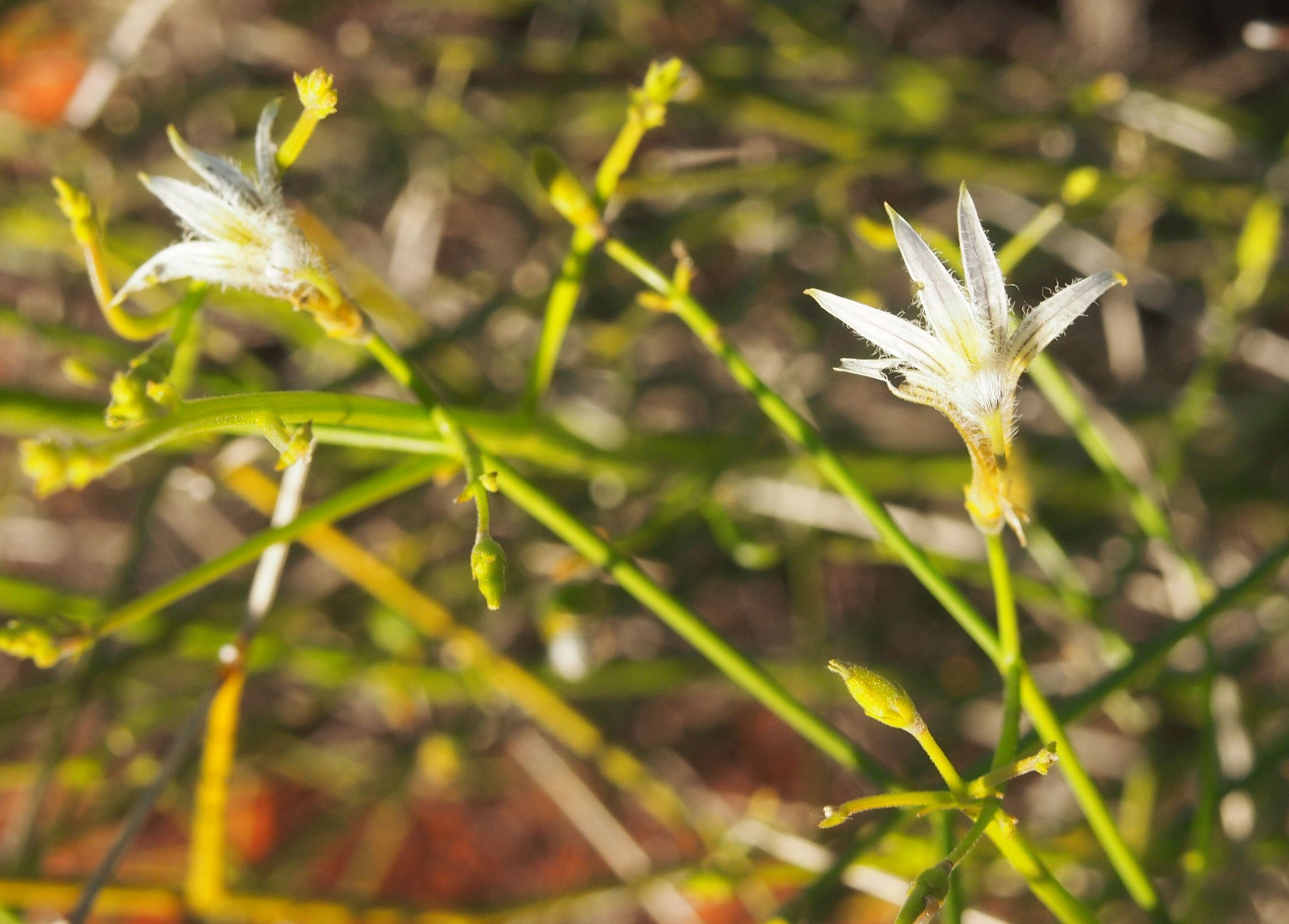

Scientific classification
- Kingdom: Plantae
- Clade: Embryophytes
- Clade: Tracheophytes
- Clade: Spermatophytes
- Clade: Angiosperms
- Clade: Eudicots
- Clade: Asterids
- Order: Asterales
- Family: Goodeniaceae
- Genus: Scaevola
- Species: S. depauperata

Binomial name
- Scaevola depauperata R.Br.
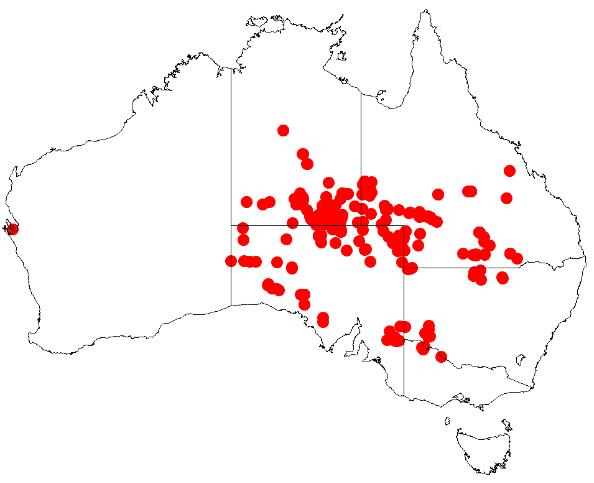
- Occurrence data from AVH

Synonyms
- Lobelia depauperata Kuntze; Merkusia depauperata de Vriese; Scaevola patens F.Muell.

= Scaevola depauperata =

Skeleton fan-flower

Species of plant

Scaevola depauperata, commonly known as skeleton fan-flower, is a species of flowering plant in the family Goodeniaceae. It is a small understorey shrub with blue, mauve or cream-white flowers. It grows in mainland states of Australia with the exception of Western Australia.

== Description ==
Scaevola depauperata is an upright, many stemmed perennial up to 1 m (3 ft 3 in) high with small glandular and simple hairs, the stems almost smooth and ridged. The leaves at the base are sessile, ovate to spoon-shaped, toothed, 60 mm (2.4 in) long and 15 mm (0.59 in) wide, older leaves more or less triangular and up to 3 mm (0.12 in) long. The corolla is cream, blue or mauve, occasionally with darker lines, petals tapering to a point, 2–30 mm (0.079–1.181 in) long, the outside covered with small, soft, upright hairs, inside thickly bearded, and the wings 1 mm (0.039 in) wide. The peduncle up to 6 cm (2.4 in) long, sepals are triangular shaped, 1–4 mm (0.039–0.157 in) long, fused at the base and the bracteoles triangular shaped and 2–4 mm (0.079–0.157 in) long. Flowering occurs from April to December and the fruit ellipsoid shaped, 5–6 mm (0.20–0.24 in) long, warty, with tiny, simple and glandular hairs sometimes longer and simple.

== Taxonomy and naming ==
Scaevola depauperata was first formally described in 1849 by Robert Brown and the description was published in Narrative of an Expedition into Central Australia from a report of expeditions into Central Australia by Charles Sturt. The specific epithet (depauperata) means "reduced".

== Distribution and habitat ==
Skeleton fan-flower grows on sand dunes and sandy soils in mallee in South Australia, Victoria, the Northern Territory, New South Wales and Queensland.

== Gallery ==
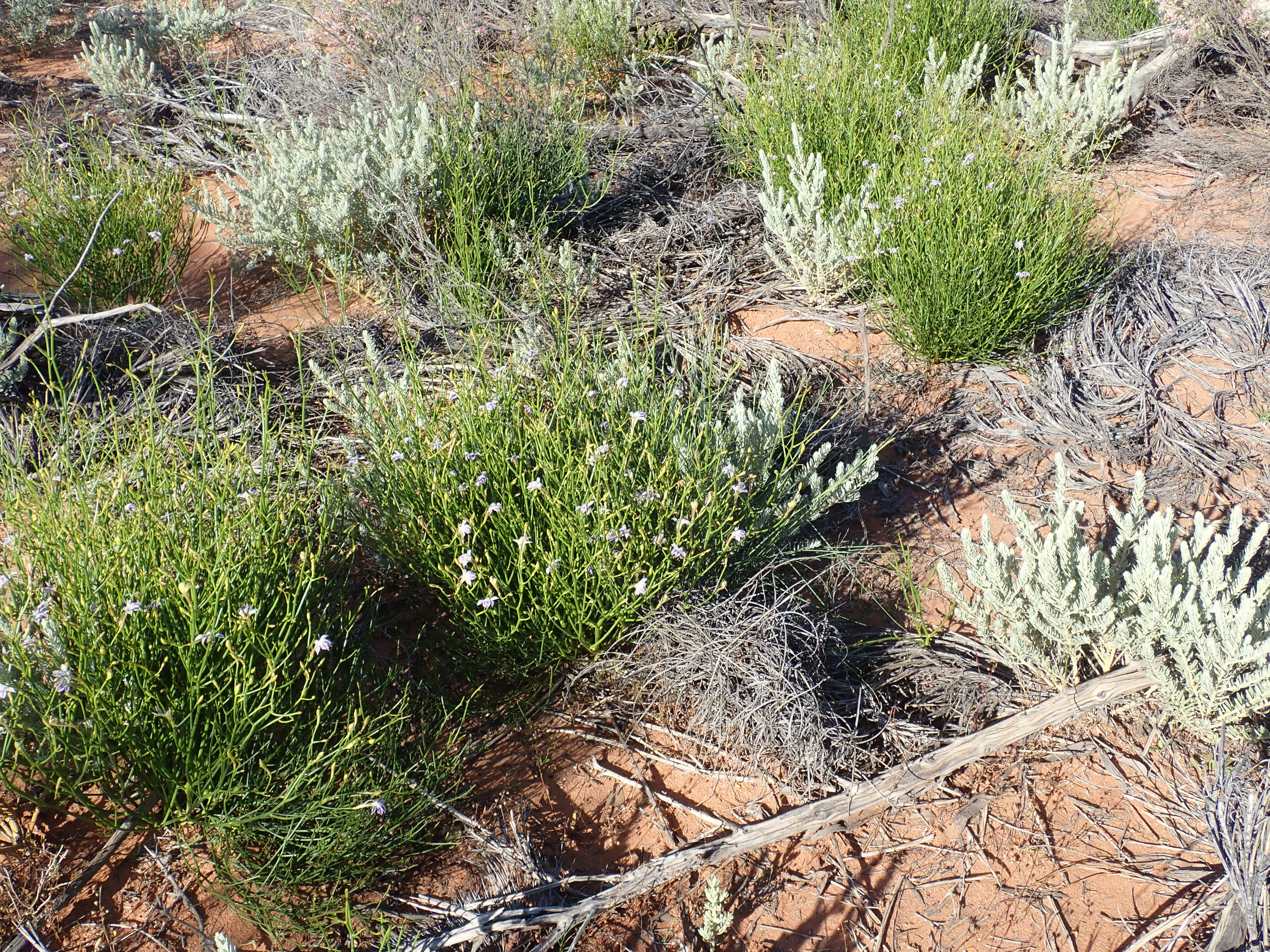
Habit

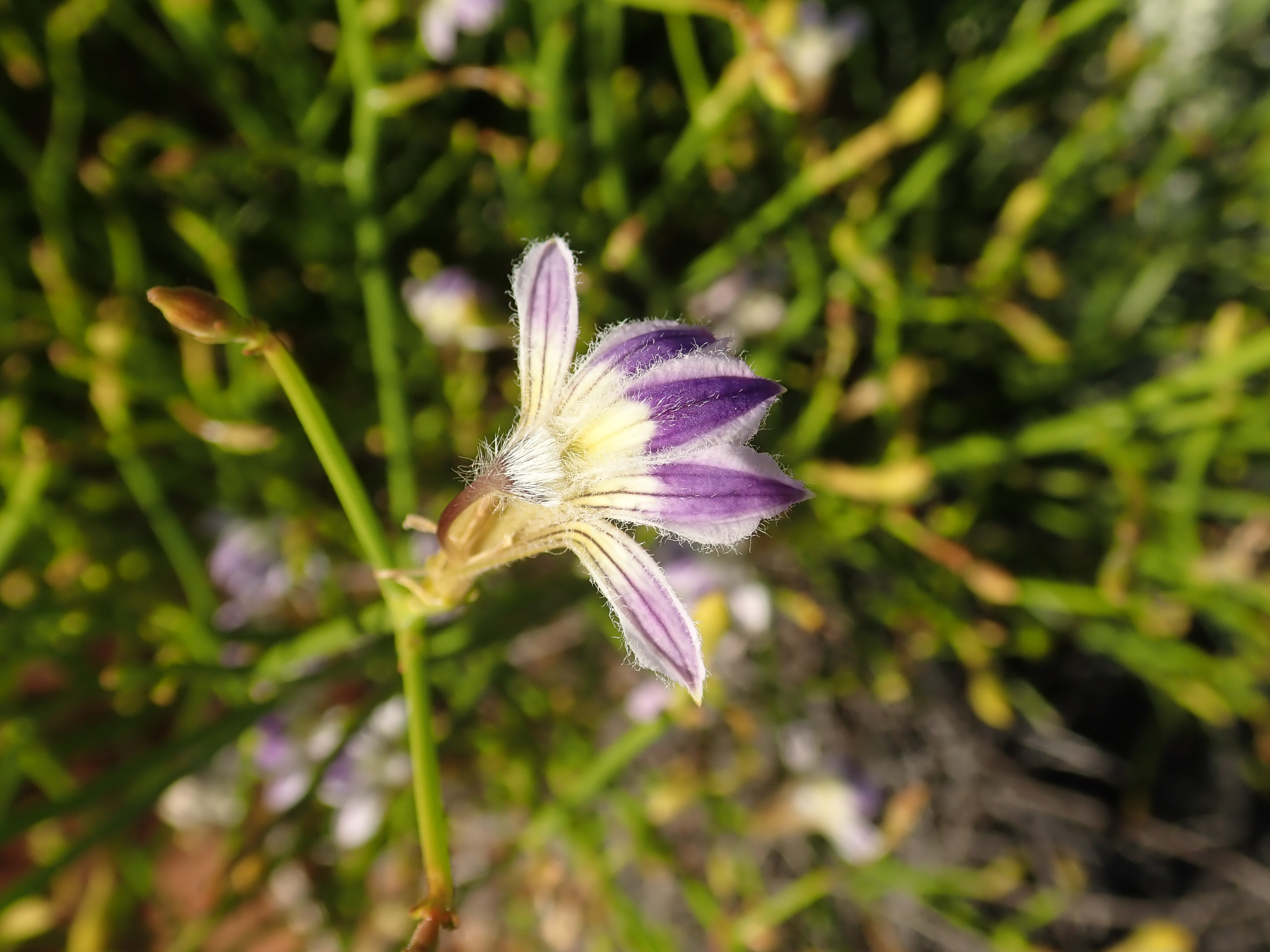
Flower
