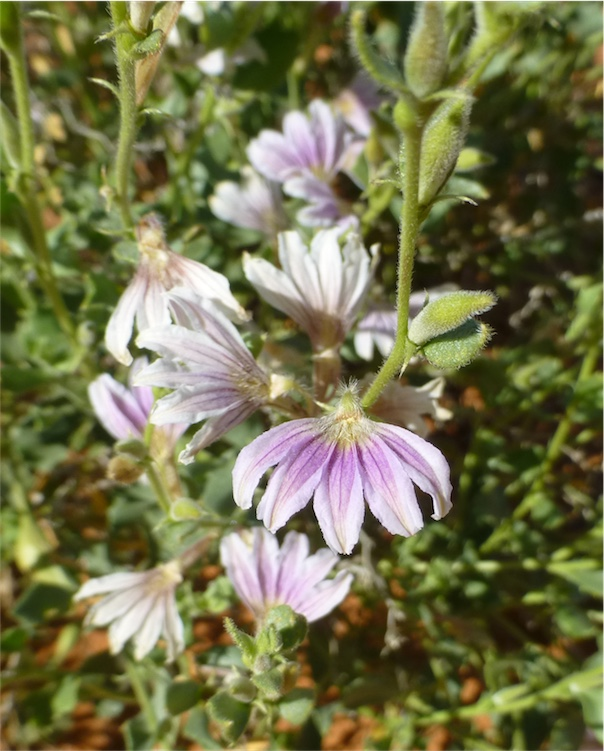

Scientific classification
- Kingdom: Plantae
- Clade: Tracheophytes
- Clade: Angiosperms
- Clade: Eudicots
- Clade: Asterids
- Order: Asterales
- Family: Goodeniaceae
- Genus: Scaevola
- Species: S. parvibarbata

Binomial name
- Scaevola parvibarbata Carolin

= Scaevola parvibarbata =

Species of flowering plant

Scaevola parvibarbata is a species of flowering plant in the family Goodeniaceae. It is an upright herb with fan-shaped mauve or greenish flowers and grows in New South Wales, Queensland, South Australia and the Northern Territory.

== Description ==
Scaevola parvibarbata is an upright herb to 50 cm (20 in) high and covered with simple hairs. The leaves are round to oblong-lance shaped, sessile, 8–40 mm (0.31–1.57 in) long, 4–20 mm (0.16–0.79 in) wide and the margins mostly toothed. The flowers are borne in spikes up to 25 cm (9.8 in) long, bracts small and leaf-like, corolla 11–25 mm (0.43–0.98 in) long, mauve or greenish, thickly bearded with simple hairs on the inside, curled or spreading hairs on the outer surface and the wings up to 1 mm (0.039 in) wide. Flowering occurs mostly from May to October and the fruit is egg-shaped, hairy, 3–5 mm (0.12–0.20 in) long and the surface wrinkled.

== Taxonomy and naming ==
Scaevola parvibarbata was first formally described in 1986 by Roger Charles Carolin and the description was published in Flora of South Australia. The specific epithet (parvibarbata) means "small" and "bearded".

== Distribution and habitat ==
This scaevola grows in dry, sandy locations in New South Wales, South Australia, Queensland and the Northern Territory.
