= The Penguin Book of Australian Verse =

1972 poetry anthology edited by Harry Heseltine

- Author: Harry Heseltine
- Language: English
- Genre: Poetry anthology
- Publisher: Penguin
- Publication date: 1972
- Publication place: Australia
- Media type: Print
- Pages: 483 pp.
- ISBN: 0140421629

The Penguin Book of Australian Verse is an anthology of Australian poetry edited and introduced by Harry Heseltine, published by Penguin in 1972.

The collection contains 270 poems, from a number of authors and sources.

== Background ==
In his introduction to this volume editor Harry Heseltine provides a number of "basic principles" he followed in making the poetry selections represented here. He had not attempted "to make every previous collection obsolete", rather "to supplement and complement that sense of what is central to our poetry which earlier collections have helped to form."

He makes no "apology" for including a number of "standard anthology pieces", though he does point out that where T. Inglis Moore compiled a volume of 278 pages of verse from the earliest colonial works up to the time of Mary Gilmore (see From the Ballads to Brennan), he, Heseltine, had made do with 50 pages of material from that period.

His aim was to include "the best poems written in this country since 1788".

== Contents ==
- "The Creek of the Four Graves", Charles Harpur
- "A Midsummer Noon in the Australian Forest", Charles Harpur
- "The Sick Stock-Rider", Adam Lindsay Gordon
- "Bell-Birds", Henry Kendall
- "The Last of His Tribe", Henry Kendall
- "The Song of Ninian Melville"Henry Kendall
- "Dreams", Victor J. Daley
- "When London Calls", Victor J. Daley
- "The Man from Snowy River", A. B. Paterson
- "Saltbush Bill", A. B. Paterson
- "Eve-Song", Mary Gilmore
- "Never Admit the Pain", Mary Gilmore
- "The Men of Eureka (A Recollection)", Mary Gilmore
- "The Yarran-Tree", Mary Gilmore
- "An Aboriginal Simile", Mary Gilmore
- "Old Botany Bay", Mary Gilmore
- "Where the Dead Men Lie", Barcroft Boake
- "An Allegory", Barcroft Boake
- "Australia", Bernard O'Dowd
- "Middleton's Rouseabout", Henry Lawson
- "The Song of Old Joe Swallow", Henry Lawson
- "One Hundred and Three", Henry Lawson
- "The Wanderer" (poetry sequence), Christopher Brennan
- "Epilogues : 1908", Christopher Brennan
- "The Silver Gull", J. Le Gay Brereton
- "The Orange Tree", John Shaw Neilson
- "Song Be Delicate", John Shaw Neilson
- "May", John Shaw Neilson
- "Native Companions Dancing", John Shaw Neilson
- "Beauty Imposes", John Shaw Neilson
- "I Blow My Pipes", Hugh McCrae
- "Ambuscade", Hugh McCrae
- "Fantasy", Hugh McCrae
- "Enigma", Hugh McCrae
- "Plunder", Furnley Maurice
- "Apples in the Moon", Furnley Maurice
- "The Agricultural Show, Flemington, Victoria", Furnley Maurice
- "The Net-Menders", Brian Vrepont
- "On Moral Laws", William Baylebridge
- "The Farmer Remembers the Somme", Vance Palmer
- "Snake's Eye View of a Serial Story", Peter Hopegood
- "These Men", Leon Gellert
- "Align Your Act", T. Inglis Moore
- "Thieves' Kitchen", Kenneth Slessor
- "Fixed Ideas", Kenneth Slessor
- "Metempsychosis", Kenneth Slessor
- "Sensuality", Kenneth Slessor
- "South Country", Kenneth Slessor
- "Captain Dobbin", Kenneth Slessor
- "Elegy in a Botanic Gardens", Kenneth Slessor
- "The Night-Ride", Kenneth Slessor
- "Five Bells", Kenneth Slessor
- "Beach Burial", Kenneth Slessor
- "The Hidden Bole", Robert D. FitzGerald
- "This Night's Orbit", Robert D. FitzGerald
- "Heemskerck Shoals", Robert D. FitzGerald
- "The Face of the Waters", Robert D. FitzGerald
- "Song in Autumn", Robert D. FitzGerald
- "Bog and Candle", Robert D. FitzGerald
- "Macquarie Place", Robert D. FitzGerald
- "The Wind at Your Door", Robert D. FitzGerald
- "Invocation of Josefa Asasela", Robert D. FitzGerald
- "Football Field : Evening", J. A. R. McKellar
- "Twelve O'Clock Boat", J. A. R. McKellar
- "For It Was Early Summer", James Picot
- "Australia", A. D. Hope
- "The Wandering Islands", A. D. Hope
- "The Death of the Bird", A. D. Hope
- "Imperial Adam", A. D. Hope
- "Pasiphae", A. D. Hope
- "Letter from the Line", A. D. Hope
- "Ode on the Death of Pius the Twelfth", A. D. Hope
- "Crossing the Frontier", A. D. Hope
- "A Latter-Day Polonius to His Sons", John Thompson
- "Attis", John Thompson
- "Moonlight", Harry Hooton
- "The Word is Too Much Withered", Harry Hooton
- "Au Tombeau de Mon Pere...", Ronald McCuaig
- "After Lunik Two", Elizabeth Riddell
- "In the Train", R. D. Murphy
- "The Inca Tupac Upanqui", William Hart-Smith
- "Postage Stamp", William Hart-Smith
- "Razor Fish", William Hart-Smith
- "They'll Tell You about Me", Ian Mudie
- "In Sunny Days of Winter", Ian Mudie
- "The North-Bound Rider", Ian Mudie
- "Hobart Town, Van Diemen's Land (June 11, 1837)", Hal Porter
- "The Desecrated Valley", C. B. Christesen
- "I Had No Human Speech", Roland Robinson
- "Altjeringa", Roland Robinson
- "Passage of the Swans", Roland Robinson
- "The Seed Goes Home", Roland Robinson
- "Death of a Whale", John Blight
- "Mud", John Blight
- "Helmet Shell", John Blight
- "Lamprey", John Blight
- "Our World", Flexmore Hudson
- "Earth-Colours", Rex Ingamells
- "Black Mary", Rex Ingamells
- "History", Rex Ingamells
- "The Moonlit Doorway", Kenneth Mackenzie
- "The Wagtail's Nest", Kenneth Mackenzie
- "Derelict", Kenneth Mackenzie
- "An Old Inmate", Kenneth Mackenzie
- "Rock Carving", Douglas Stewart
- "The Dosser in Springtime", Douglas Stewart
- "The Brown Snake", Douglas Stewart
- "One Yard of Earth", Douglas Stewart
- "B Flat", Douglas Stewart
- "The Silkworms", Douglas Stewart
- "Firewheel Tree", Douglas Stewart
- "Fence", Douglas Stewart
- "Professor Piccard", Douglas Stewart
- "Orpheus and the Trees", Harold Stewart
- "A Sydney Scot When the Boat Comes In", J. M. Couper
- "Horace, Odes, 1, 5 : Surfers' Paradise (For You Angela : Surfers' Paradise)", J. M. Couper
- "Apopemptic Hymn", Dorothy Auchterlonie
- "Men in Green", David Campbell
- "Windy Gap", David Campbell
- "Night Sowing", David Campbell
- "Under Wattles", David Campbell
- "Droving", David Campbell
- "Windy Nights", David Campbell
- "The Tomb of Lt. John Learmonth, AIF", J. S. Manifold
- "The Showmen", J. S. Manifold
- "Gordon Childe", David Martin
- "The Company of Lovers", Judith Wright
- "Bullocky", Judith Wright
- "South of My Days", Judith Wright
- "Woman to Man", Judith Wright
- "The Cycads", Judith Wright
- "Our Love is So Natural", Judith Wright
- "Black Shouldered Kite", Judith Wright
- "The Harp and the King", Judith Wright
- "Clock and Heart", Judith Wright
- "Typists in the Phoenix Building", Judith Wright
- "The Beanstalk, Meditated Later", Judith Wright
- "Moon and Pear-Tree", Nancy Cato
- "Terra Australis", James McAuley
- "The Incarnation of Sirius", James McAuley
- "Tune for Swans", James McAuley
- "Celebration of Divine Love", James McAuley
- "A Leaf of Sage", James McAuley
- "Aubade", James McAuley
- "Pieta", James McAuley
- "St John's Park, New Town", James McAuley
- "Because", James McAuley
- "The Cloak", James McAuley
- "Consecration of the House", Wolfe Fairbridge
- "The Mirror : Jan Vermeer Speaks", Rosemary Dobson
- "Cock Crow", Rosemary Dobson
- "Jack", Rosemary Dobson
- "The Wound", Gwen Harwood
- "Triste, Triste", Walter Lehmann
- "The Glass Jar", Gwen Harwood
- "Estuary", Gwen Harwood
- "Cocktails at Seven", Gwen Harwood
- "Up-Country Pubs", Colin Thiele
- "We Are Going", Oodgeroo Noonuccal
- "Municipal Gum", Oodgeroo Noonuccal
- "A Window at Night", Max Harris
- "The Death of Bert Sassenowsky", Max Harris
- "My Grandfather Goes Blind", T. Harri Jones
- "The Bus-Ride Home", Nan McDonald
- "Abandoned Airstrip, Northern Territory", Geoffrey Dutton
- "January", Geoffrey Dutton
- "Marshal Ky in Australia: A Postscript", Geoffrey Dutton
- "Our Crypto-Wowsers", Geoffrey Dutton
- "Sea at Portsea", Alexander Craig
- "Go Down Red Roses", Dorothy Hewett
- "The Goat with the Golden Eyes", Nancy Keesing
- "Sheaf-Tosser", Eric Rolls
- "The Knife", Eric Rolls
- "The Candle is Going Out", David Rowbotham
- "First Man Lost in Space", David Rowbotham
- "Late Tutorial", Vincent Buckley
- "Colloquy and Resolution", Vincent Buckley
- "Places", Vincent Buckley
- "Burning the Effects", Vincent Buckley
- "Youth Leader", Vincent Buckley
- "Hand in Hand", Laurence Collinson
- "The Way to the Headland", Jill Hellyer
- "Canberra in April", J. R. Rowland
- "Dawn Stepping Down", J. R. Rowland
- "On First Hearing a Cuckoo", Francis Webb
- "The Yellowhammer", Francis Webb
- "Pneumo-Encephalograph", Francis Webb
- "Harry)", Francis Webb
- "Wild Honey", Francis Webb
- "A Small Dirge for the Trade", Noel Macainsh
- "Isaac", Wilma Hedley
- "Red Scarf", Grace Perry
- "Time of Turtles, Grace Perry
- "Goldfish at an Angle", Alan Riddell
- "At the Hammersmith Palais ...", Alan Riddell
- "Exit", Bruce Beaver
- "Holiday", Bruce Beaver
- "Sittings by Appointment Only", Bruce Beaver
- "Letters to Live Poets : Frank O'Hara", Bruce Beaver
- "Your Attention Please", Peter Porter
- "Competition is Healthy", Peter Porter
- "Moaning in Midstream", Peter Porter
- "Student", R. A. Simpson
- "Carboni in the Chimney", R. A. Simpson
- "How To Go on Not Looking", Bruce Dawe
- "The Not-So-Good Earth", Bruce Dawe
- "Life-Cycle", Bruce Dawe
- "A Victorian Hangman Tells His Love", Bruce Dawe
- "Homecoming", Bruce Dawe
- "Still Lives", Charles Higham
- "Dusk at Waterfall", Charles Higham
- "Harbourscape", Charles Higham
- "The War Museum at Nagasaki", Charles Higham
- "The Creature", Charles Higham
- "Noah's Song", Evan Jones
- "Boxing On", Evan Jones
- "Reconciliation", John Croyston
- "Dialogue with a Contemporary", Vivian Smith
- "Late April: Hobart", Vivian Smith
- "Balmoral Summer '66", Vivian Smith
- "At a School Athletics Day", David Malouf
- "The Priestess of the Temple", Ann Irvine Tregenza
- "Melbourne", Chris Wallace-Crabbe
- "A Wintry Manifesto", Chris Wallace-Crabbe
- "The Secular", Chris Wallace-Crabbe
- "Nature, Language, the Sea : An Essay", Chris Wallace-Crabbe
- "Rustum", Chris Wallace-Crabbe
- "The Hunter", Rodney Hall
- "The Two Staircases of Consummation", Rodney Hall
- "Heaven, in a Way", Rodney Hall
- "Cut-Out", Rodney Hall
- "Enemies", Thomas Shapcott
- "Quetzalcoatl", Thomas Shapcott
- "Party in Room 21", Thomas Shapcott
- "Death of the Minotaur", Thomas Shapcott
- "Dust", Randolph Stow
- "Ruins of the City of Hay", Randolph Stow
- "Sleep", Randolph Stow
- "Ishmael", Randolph Stow
- "Ballad of Old Women and of How They are Constrained to Simulate Youth in Order to Avoid Shocking the Young", Norman Talbot
- "How to Write 2 Poems", Don Maynard
- "O'Flaherty in a Serious Mood", B. A. Breen
- "O'Flaherty's Confession", B. A. Breen
- "O'Flaherty Considers a Crucifix", B. A. Breen
- "O'Flaherty Passing Through", B. A. Breen
- "O'Flaherty Writes His Weekly Letter", B. A. Breen
- "O'Flaherty on the Establishment", B. A. Breen
- "O'Flaherty is Asked To Be Politically Active", B. A. Breen
- "O'Flaherty Waxes Lyrical at a Party", B. A. Breen
- "O'Flaherty on Education", B. A. Breen
- "O'Flaherty to His Mistress", B. A. Breen
- "A New England Farm, August 1914", Les Murray
- "The Princes' Land", Les Murray
- "Blood", Les Murray
- "The Wilderness", Les Murray
- "An Absolutely Ordinary Rainbow", Les Murray
- "Matins", Peter Steele
- "The Pigs", Geoffrey Lehmann
- "A Voyage of Lions", Geoffrey Lehmann
- "Five Days Late", Geoffrey Lehmann
- "Pear Days in Queensland", Geoffrey Lehmann
- "Nembutal Rock", Craig Powell
- "The Sistine Spiders", Andrew Taylor
- "1966-1986", Roger McDonald
- "The Moment of Waking", John Tranter
- "Toward Abstraction : Possibly a Gull's Wing", Robert Adamson
- "The Farmer", Peter Skrzynecki
- "Epiderm", Michael Dransfield
- "Ground Zero", Michael Dransfield
- "To This Place", Charles Buckmaster

== Critical reception ==
Philp Roberts, reviewing the anthology for The Sydney Morning Herald, called the book "a truly fair selection of what most readers would see as the core of Australian poetry."

In The Canberra Times Maurice Dunlevy tended to agree with this assessment, concluding: "Harry Heseltine's selections are in general representative of current critical evaluations. He has gathered most of the poems that most critics would regard as valuable, except in the case of the major poets, who cannot be represented adequately by short selections. The book is now the best available anthology of Australian verse."

== See also ==
- 1972 in Australian literature
