= Clubbing the Gunfire =

1984 Australian poetry anthology

Clubbing of the Gunfire : 101 Australian War Poems
- Author: Chris Wallace-Crabbe & Peter Pierce (editors)
- Language: English
- Genre: Poetry anthology
- Publisher: Melbourne University Press
- Publication date: 1984
- Publication place: Australia
- Media type: Print
- Pages: 224 pp.
- ISBN: 0522842895

Clubbing of the Gunfire : 101 Australian War Poems is an anthology of poems by Australian poets edited by Chris Wallace-Crabbe and Peter Pierce, published by Melbourne University Press in 1984.

The collection contains 99 poems from 71 different poets.

The poems here are grouped into four parts: Part One: Imperial Wars 1885–1902, Part Two: The Great War 1914–1918, Part Three: The Second World War 1939–1945, Part Four: Asian Wars 1950–1972.

== Contents ==
- A. B. Paterson
  - "El Mahdi to the Australian Troops"
- H. P. Ellis
  - "His Letter : To the Committee, New South Wales Patriotic Fund"
- Christopher Brennan
  - "The Burden of Tyre : VI"
- Randolph Bedford
  - "The Rhyme of Rudyard K."
- Henry Lawson
  - "Who'll Wear the Beaten Colours?"
- Breaker Morant
  - "Butchered to Make a Dutchman's Holiday"
- R. Stewart
  - "The Sword of Genghis Khan"
- Christopher Brennan
  - "Irish to English : 26th April 1916"
  - From : "A Chant of Doom"
  - "Reflections of a Retired Symbolist Poet 1916"
- Henry Lawson
  - "England Yet"
- Leon Gellert
  - "The Wrecked Aeroplane"
  - "The Death"
  - "Requiem (The Last to Leave)"
- Harley Matthews
  - "True Patriot"
- Mary Gilmore
  - "Gallipoli"
- J. Le Gay Brereton
  - "The Dead"
- Vance Palmer
  - "The Farmer Remembers the Somme"
  - "The Camp"
- Frederic Manning
  - "The Trenches"
  - "Grotesque"
- Furnley Maurice
  - From : "To Gods from the Weary Nations"
- Oscar Walters
  - "One Sunday Mornin'"
- Edwin Field Gerard, 'Gerardy'
  - "Riding Song"
- C. J. Dennis
  - "The Push"
- John Shaw Neilson
  - "Take Down the Fiddle, Karl!"
- Les Murray
  - "The Trainee, 1914"
  - "Lament for the Country Soldiers"
  - "Visiting Anzac in the Year of Metrication"
- Roger McDonald
  - "1915"
- Geoff Page
  - "Christ at Gallipoli"
  - "Trench Dreams"
- Chris Wallace-Crabbe
  - "The Shapes of Gallipoli"
- David Martin
  - "Soldiers"
  - "Lament for the Gordons"
- Harley Matthews
  - "Dream in the Park"
  - "Resurgence"
  - "Casualty"
- Geoffrey Dutton
  - "Night Flight"
  - "Enterprise, My Heart"
  - "The Recruit"
- Kenneth Mackenzie
  - "The Tree at Post 4"
  - "Searchlights"
  - "Dawn (Post 3)"
- J. S. Manifold
  - "The Tomb of Lt. John Learmonth, AIF"
  - "Fife Tune"
  - "Defensive Position"
  - "Oerlikon (Maritime A.A.)"
- David Griffin
  - "Changi Impromptu"
- James Picot
  - "Australia to a War"
- R. S. Byrnes
  - "Song Out of Syria"
- David Campbell
  - "Men in Green"
  - "Pedrina"
- John Quinn
  - "Argument"
- Paul Buddee
  - "Stand To"
- Mungo MacCallum
  - "The Dream"
- William Hart-Smith
  - "Night Picket"
- J. Elgar Owen
  - "Maturity"
- G. A. Wagner
  - "Thoughts on Striking Camp : Philippeville, Algerie"
- John Millett
  - From : "Tail Arse Charlie"
- David McNicoll
  - "Ski Patrol"
- Anonymous
  - "On Leaving the Middle East"
- F. B. Fletcher
  - "The Straits of Bab-el-Mandeb - A Mezzotint"
- John Thompson
  - "1943"
- Kenneth Slessor
  - "An Inscription for Dog River"
  - "Beach Burial"
- Francis Webb
  - "The Gunner"
  - "Dawn Wind on the Islands"
- Clive Turnbull
  - "Do This For Me, Then"
- Elisabeth Lambert
  - "Wartime Capital"
- Mary Bell
  - "Horizons"
- Judith Wright
  - "The Trains"
  - "The Idler"
- Albrecht Haushofer, James McAuley (translator)
  - "Companions"
- Vincent Buckley
  - "Give Me Time and I'll Tell You"
- R. A. Simpson
  - "The Start of the Second World War"
- David Malouf
  - "The Year of the Foxes"
- Allen Afterman
  - "Narcissus Near Birkenau"
- Rodney Hall
  - "Wedding Day at Nagasaki"
- Ray Mathew
  - "Let Us Not Pretend"
- Brian Vrepont
  - "Comment 1951-52"
- Robert D. FitzGerald
  - "Deep Within Man"
  - "Verse for a Friend"
- Roland Robinson
  - "Cleaning the Tailer (The Status Quo)"
- David Campbell
  - "My Lai"
- Craig Powell
  - "Wedding Feast"
- Bruce Beaver
  - "Poem"
  - "Letters to Live Poets: XV"
- John Blight
  - "Helmet Shell"
- Charles Higham
  - "Missing in Vietnam"
- Evan Jones
  - "A Running War"
- Hal Colebatch
  - "Poem"
- Roger McDonald
  - "Spider Garden"
- Jennifer Strauss
  - "A Just Cause"
- A. D. Hope
  - "Inscription for Any War (Inscription for a War)"
- Bruce Dawe
  - "The Saigon-Dalat Night-Train Runs Infrequently..."
  - "Weapons Training"
  - "The Fate of Armies"
  - "Homecoming"

== Critical reception ==
Gerard Windsor, in The Bulletin, found the volume "is an alternative history of Australia’s second century. I am not sure the book realises this itself. But the outline is there."

In The Canberra Times reviewer Peter Lugg noted that there "are really two collections in this rather interesting anthology of war poems...One group of poems was written by poets who lived at the time of the events described...[the other group of] poems were written at some remove from the events they describe, although this is not always true in relation to Vietnam." Lugg considered that the poems in the second group were more successful and that not "all the poems in this collection are memorable. Nevertheless they do provide an interesting text to be read alongside the histories".

== Notes ==
- Although the title indicates there are 101 poems in the volume, the true count is 99.
- Epigraph: "Between the sob and clubbing of the gunfire / Someone, it seems, has time for this, / To pluck them from the shallows and bury them in burrows / And tread the sand upon their nakedness..." – Kenneth Slessor.

== See also ==
- 1984 in Australian literature
