= The Golden Apples of the Sun : Twentieth Century Australian Poetry =

1980 poetry anthology edited by Chris Wallace-Crabbe

- Author: Chris Wallace-Crabbe
- Language: English
- Genre: Poetry anthology
- Publisher: Melbourne University Press
- Publication date: 1980
- Publication place: Australia
- Media type: Print
- Pages: 243 pp.
- ISBN: 0522841929

The Golden Apples of the Sun : Twentieth Century Australian Poetry is an anthology of 20th century Australian poetry edited by Chris Wallace-Crabbe, published by Melbourne University Press in 1980.

The collection contains 169 poems, from a number of authors and sources.

== Contents ==
- "Nationality", Mary Gilmore
- "An Aboriginal Simile", Mary Gilmore
- "The Wanderer : 1902- : 86", Christopher Brennan
- "The Wanderer : 1902- : 88", Christopher Brennan
- "The Wanderer : 1902- : 87", Christopher Brennan
- "The Wanderer : 1902- : 89", Christopher Brennan
- "The Wanderer : 1902- : 90", Christopher Brennan
- "How Old is My Heart (The Wanderer : 1902- : 91)", Christopher Brennan
- "The Wanderer : 1902- : 92", Christopher Brennan
- "The Wanderer : 1902- : 93", Christopher Brennan
- "The Wanderer : 1902- : 94", Christopher Brennan
- "The Wanderer : 1902- : 95", Christopher Brennan
- "The Wanderer : 1902- : 96", Christopher Brennan
- "The Wanderer : 1902- : 97", Christopher Brennan
- "The Wanderer : 1902- : 98", Christopher Brennan
- "The Wanderer : 1902- : 99", Christopher Brennan
- "The Forest of Night : 1898-1902 : The Quest of Silence : Secreta Silvarum: III : 51", Christopher Brennan
- "The Orange Tree", John Shaw Neilson
- "Song Be Delicate", John Shaw Neilson
- "Native Companions Dancing", John Shaw Neilson
- "May", John Shaw Neilson
- "Fragment", Hugh McCrae
- "The Farmer Remembers the Somme", Vance Palmer
- "The Night-Ride", Kenneth Slessor
- "South Country", Kenneth Slessor
- "Captain Dobbin", Kenneth Slessor
- "Sleep", Kenneth Slessor
- "Five Bells", Kenneth Slessor
- "Beach Burial", Kenneth Slessor
- "The Face of the Waters", Robert D. FitzGerald
- "Fifth Day", Robert D. FitzGerald
- "Beginnings", Robert D. FitzGerald
- "Height : Pine-Tree, Madeline Street", Robert D. FitzGerald
- "For It Was Early Summer", James Picot
- "Lost Love", Clive Turnbull
- "Australia", A. D. Hope
- "Ascent into Hell", A. D. Hope
- "Imperial Adam", A. D. Hope
- "The Double Looking Glass", A. D. Hope
- "In Memoriam : Gertrud Kolmar, 1943", A. D. Hope
- "The Commercial Traveller's Wife", Ronald McCuaig
- "Au Tombeau de Mon Pere...", Ronald McCuaig
- "Country Tune", Elizabeth Riddell
- "Christopher Columbus : Space (Columbus Goes West)", William Hart-Smith
- "Black Stockman", William Hart-Smith
- "Traffic", William Hart-Smith
- "I Had No Human Speech", Roland Robinson
- "The Myth and the Mountain", Roland Robinson
- "The Leone", John Blight
- "The Bone", John Blight
- "The Moonlit Doorway", Kenneth Mackenzie
- "Two Trinities", Kenneth Mackenzie
- "An Old Inmate", Kenneth Mackenzie
- "Terra Australis", Douglas Stewart
- "B Flat", Douglas Stewart
- "The Snow Gum", Douglas Stewart
- "The Silkworms", Douglas Stewart
- "Horace, Odes, 1, 5 : Surfers' Paradise (For You Angela : Surfers' Paradise)", J. M. Couper
- "Men in Green", David Campbell
- "Windy Gap", David Campbell
- "Mothers and Daughters", David Campbell
- "A Letter (Dear Maurice)", David Campbell
- "The Australian Dream", David Campbell
- "The Tomb of Lt. John Learmonth, AIF", J. S. Manifold
- "A Hat in the Ring", J. S. Manifold
- "Fife Tune", J. S. Manifold
- "Brother and Sisters", Judith Wright
- "South of My Days", Judith Wright
- "Woman to Man", Judith Wright
- "Train Journey", Judith Wright
- "Extinct Birds", Judith Wright
- "Unless", Judith Wright
- "Therefore", Judith Wright
- "Enough", Judith Wright
- "Never", Judith Wright
- "Forever", Judith Wright
- "A Flight of Wild Geese", Harold Stewart
- "Envoi for a Book of Poems", James McAuley
- "The Incarnation of Sirius", James McAuley
- "Invocation", James McAuley
- "Because", James McAuley
- "The Bystander", Rosemary Dobson
- "Country Press", Rosemary Dobson
- "I Am the Captain of My Soul", Gwen Harwood
- "In Brisbane", Gwen Harwood
- "All Souls'", Francis Geyer
- "Person to Person", Gwen Harwood
- "We Are Going", Oodgeroo Noonuccal
- "Ixion", Lex Banning
- "Apocalypse in Springtime", Lex Banning
- "The Tantanoola Tiger", Max Harris
- "On Throwing a Copy of the New Statesman into the Coorong", Max Harris
- "In Moncur Street", Dorothy Hewett
- "Miss Hewett's Shenanigans", Dorothy Hewett
- "Secret Policeman", Vincent Buckley
- "Golden Builders : I", Vincent Buckley
- "Golden Builders : II", Vincent Buckley
- "Golden Builders : III : Practising Not Dying (i)", Vincent Buckley
- "Golden Builders : IV", Vincent Buckley
- "Golden Builders : V", Vincent Buckley
- "Golden Builders : XXVII", Vincent Buckley
- "In Southeast Asia : Viet Nam", J. R. Rowland
- "For My Grandfather", Francis Webb
- "Dawn Wind on the Islands", Francis Webb
- "Morgan's Country", Francis Webb
- "A Death at Winson Green", Francis Webb
- "Ward Two : Harry", Francis Webb
- "Angels' Weather", Bruce Beaver
- "Letters to Live Poets: XVI", Bruce Beaver
- "The Death of Damiens or L'Apres-Midi des Lumieres : Place de Greve, Paris, March 28, 1757", R. F. Brissenden
- "Sydney Cove, 1788", Peter Porter
- "The Last of England", Peter Porter
- "An Exequy", Peter Porter
- "Non Piangere, Liu, Peter Porter
- "'In the New World Happiness Is Allowed'", Peter Porter
- "Landscape", R. A. Simpson
- "All Friends Together : A Survey of Present-Day Australian Poetry", R. A. Simpson
- "Visit to the Museum", R. A. Simpson
- "First Corinthians at the Crossroads", Bruce Dawe
- "Drifters", Bruce Dawe
- "The Not-So-Good Earth", Bruce Dawe
- "Homecoming", Bruce Dawe
- "The Falling Sickness", Evan Jones
- "The Compound", Evan Jones
- "Language, Talk to Me", Evan Jones
- "At an Exhibition of Historical Paintings, Hobart", Vivian Smith
- "Summer Pogrom", Fay Zwicky
- "The Year of the Foxes", David Malouf
- "A Charm Against the Dumps", David Malouf
- "A Wintry Manifesto", Chris Wallace-Crabbe
- "An Allegiance", Chris Wallace-Crabbe
- "Introspection", Chris Wallace-Crabbe
- "Old Men During a Fall of Government", Chris Wallace-Crabbe
- "Homecoming", Richard Packer
- "The Trees: A Convict Monologue", Thomas Shapcott
- "June Fugue", Thomas Shapcott
- "Mid-Point : The Blue Paisley Shirt", Thomas Shapcott
- "Dust", Randolph Stow
- "Ruins of the City of Hay", Randolph Stow
- "Eskimo Occasion", Judith Rodriguez
- "Water a Thousand Feet Deep (for Ensor)", Judith Rodriguez
- "A New England Farm, August 1914", Les Murray
- "An Absolutely Ordinary Rainbow", Les Murray
- "Senryu", Les Murray
- "The Ballad of Jimmy Governor : H.M. Prison, Darlinghurst, 18th January 1901", Les Murray
- "The Buladelah-Taree Holiday Song Cycle", Les Murray
- "Living / Dying", Peter Steele
- "Out after Dark", Geoffrey Lehmann
- "The Telescope at Siding Springs", Geoffrey Lehmann
- "The Nocturne in the Corner Phonebox", Andrew Taylor
- "Cosimo : R.I.P. Rome 1964", Andrew Taylor
- "Two Summers in Moravia", Roger McDonald
- "Green Ash", Jennifer Rankin
- "From : The Alphabet Murders", John Tranter
- "Sonnets to Be Written from Prison", Robert Adamson
- "She Moves the Sea The River", Robert Adamson
- "Autumn", Christine Churches
- "Autumn (for My Son)", Christine Churches
- "A Poem is Not", Gary Catalano
- "Discovering Parts of a Body", Rhyll McMaster
- "Underneath the House", Rhyll McMaster
- "Sifting Stones at Capri", Susan Afterman
- "Courland Penders : Going Home", Michael Dransfield
- "St Bartholomew Remembers Jesus Christ as an Athlete", Alan Wearne
- "Eating Out (for Robin Rattray-Wood)", Alan Wearne
- "Tobacco", Robert Harris
- "Ode to Tropical Skiing", John Forbes
- "The Twenty-First Century", Kevin Hart

== Critical reception ==
A reviewer of the anthology in The Bulletin noted that in this anthology "Chris Wallace-Crabbe has concentrated editorially on the poetry that has the qualities of vivacity and memorability. There may be sins of omission but not of commission."

Fleur Adcock, in The Times Literary Supplement, found that Wallace-Crabbe had done an acceptable job of editing this anthology: "On the whole the choice of poets is, despite the risk of randomness inherent in the editor's policy, sensible and balanced. No one really notable is missing, although he omits a few minor voices from the early years of the century and one vocal but not greatly distinguished contemporary; the relative proportions of space allotted to each poet seem about right too."

== See also ==
- 1980 in Australian literature
