= The Penguin Book of Modern Australian Poetry =

The Penguin Book of Modern Australian Poetry (Published in the U. K. by Bloodaxe Books as The Bloodaxe Book of Modern Australian Poetry) is a major anthology of twentieth century Australian poetry. Edited by poets Philip Mead and John Tranter it was published by Penguin Australia in 1991. Aside from the usual criticisms any such anthology will produce, it raised some eyebrows at the time for its inclusion of all the Ern Malley hoax poems. It might be claimed there is no accepted canon of contemporary Australian poetry and this book is the (uncontroversial and arguably comprehensive) selection of its editors.

== Poets in The Penguin Book of Modern Australian Poetry ==
- Robert Adamson
- Bruce Beaver
- Judith Beveridge
- John Blight
- Ken Bolton
- Pamela Brown
- Vincent Buckley
- Charles Buckmaster
- Joanne Burns
- Caroline Caddy
- David Campbell
- Lee Cataldi
- Aileen Corpus
- Anna Couani
- Jack Davis
- Bruce Dawe
- Rosemary Dobson
- Michael Dransfield
- Laurie Duggan
- Lionel Fogarty
- John Forbes
- Alan Gould
- Robert Gray
- Philip Hammial
- Susan Hampton
- Robert Harris
- J. S. Harry
- Kevin Hart
- William Hart-Smith
- Gwen Harwood
- Kris Hemensley
- Dorothy Hewett
- Philip Hodgins
- A. D. Hope
- John Jenkins
- Kate Jennings
- Martin Johnston
- Rae Desmond Jones
- Antigone Kefala
- S. K. Kelen
- John Kinsella
- Anthony Lawrence
- Geoffrey Lehmann
- Kate Lilley
- James McAuley
- Roger McDonald
- Kenneth Mackenzie
- Rhyll McMaster
- Jennifer Maiden
- Ern Malley
- David Malouf
- Billy Marshall Stoneking
- Philip Mead
- Peter Minter
- Mudrooroo
- Les Murray
- Oodgeroo Noonuccal
- Geoff Page
- Dorothy Porter
- Peter Porter
- Jennifer Rankin
- Nigel Roberts
- Judith Rodriguez
- Peter Rose
- Gig Ryan
- Philip Salom
- John A. Scott
- Tom Shapcott
- Alex Skovron
- Peter Skrzynecki
- Kenneth Slessor
- Randolph Stow
- Jennifer Strauss
- Bobbi Sykes
- Andrew Taylor
- Tim Thorne
- Richard Tipping
- John Tranter
- Dimitris Tsaloumas
- Vicki Viidikas
- Chris Wallace-Crabbe
- Ania Walwicz
- Alan Wearne
- Francis Webb
- Archie Weller
- Judith Wright
- Fay Zwicky

== See also ==
- 1991 in poetry
- Literature of Australia
