= Australian Poetry in the Twentieth Century =

1991 poetry anthology edited by Robert Gray and Geoffrey Lehmann

- Author: Robert Gray and Geoffrey Lehmann
- Language: English
- Genre: Poetry anthology
- Publisher: Heinemann
- Publication date: 1991
- Publication place: Australia
- Media type: Print
- Pages: 451 pp.
- ISBN: 0855613912

Australian Poetry in the Twentieth Century is an anthology of Australian poetry edited and introduced by Robert Gray and Geoffrey Lehmann, published by Heinemann in 1991.

The collection contains 263 poems, from a number of authors and sources.

== Contents ==
- "Aubade", Christopher Brennan
- "Towards the Source : 1894-97 : 7", Christopher Brennan
- "The Wanderer : 1902- : 86", Christopher Brennan
- "The Wanderer : 1902- : 88", Christopher Brennan
- "The Wanderer : 1902- : 87", Christopher Brennan
- "The Wanderer : 1902- : 90", Christopher Brennan
- "How Old is My Heart (The Wanderer : 1902- : 91)", Christopher Brennan
- "The Wanderer : 1902- : 93", Christopher Brennan
- "The Wanderer : 1902- : 94", Christopher Brennan
- "The Wanderer : 1902- : 95", Christopher Brennan
- "The Wanderer : 1902- : 96", Christopher Brennan
- "The Wanderer : 1902- : 97", Christopher Brennan
- "The Wanderer : 1902- : 98", Christopher Brennan
- "The Wanderer : 1902- : 99", Christopher Brennan
- "The Hour of the Parting", John Shaw Neilson
- "May", John Shaw Neilson
- "Schoolgirls Hastening", John Shaw Neilson
- "Sunday Evening", John Shaw Neilson
- "You, and Yellow Air", John Shaw Neilson
- "The Ways of the Wildflower", John Shaw Neilson
- "The Loving Tree", John Shaw Neilson
- "Eva Has Gone", John Shaw Neilson
- "The Birds Go By", John Shaw Neilson
- [Untitled], John Shaw Neilson
- "Tell Summer that I Died", John Shaw Neilson
- [Untitled], John Shaw Neilson
- "June Morning", Hugh McCrae
- "The Watchers", Hugh McCrae
- "Ambuscade", Hugh McCrae
- "Dedicatory", Mary Gilmore
- "Eve-Song",Mary Gilmore
- "The Waradgeri Tribe The Waragery Tribe The Wadgery Tribe ", Mary Gilmore
- "Day's End", Lesbia Harford
- "Summer Lightning", Lesbia Harford
- "The Invisible People", Lesbia Harford
- "Closing Time : Public Library", Lesbia Harford
- "Two Brothers", Harley Matthews
- "Next Turn", Kenneth Slessor
- "The Night-Ride", Kenneth Slessor
- "Captain Dobbin", Kenneth Slessor
- "[Untitled]", Kenneth Slessor
- "Wild Grapes", Kenneth Slessor
- "The Country Ride", Kenneth Slessor
- "Out of Time", Kenneth Slessor
- "North Country", Kenneth Slessor
- "South Country", Kenneth Slessor
- "Full Orchestra", Kenneth Slessor
- "Five Bells", Kenneth Slessor
- "Beach Burial", Kenneth Slessor
- "The Face of the Waters", Robert D. FitzGerald
- "The Damnation of Byron", A. D. Hope
- "The Return from the Freudian Islands", A. D. Hope
- "The Martyrdom of St. Teresa", A. D. Hope
- "The Double Looking Glass", A. D. Hope
- "Ode on the Death of Pius the Twelfth", A. D. Hope
- "Moschus Moschiferus : A Song for St Cecilia's Day", A. D. Hope
- "On an Engraving by Casserius", A. D. Hope
- "The Ballad of Dan Homer", A. D. Hope
- "Native-Born", Eve Langley
- "Mrs Agnes McCuaig at the Piano", Ronald McCuaig
- "Au Tombeau de Mon Pere...", Ronald McCuaig
- "Wakeful in the Township", Elizabeth Riddell
- "Occasions of Birds", Elizabeth Riddell
- "Nullarbor", William Hart-Smith
- "Man into Trees", William Hart-Smith
- "Drifting Dug-Out", Roland Robinson
- "To a Mate", Roland Robinson
- "Casuarina", Roland Robinson
- "The Drovers", Roland Robinson
- "The Prisoners", Roland Robinson
- "Northern Oriole", Roland Robinson
- "Deep Well", Roland Robinson
- "Yoola and the Seven Sisters", Minyanderri
- "Mapooram", Roland Robinson
- "The Star-Tribes", Roland Robinson
- "Fisherman and Jetty", John Blight
- "Nor'-Easter", John Blight
- "Crab", John Blight
- "Stingray Bay", John Blight
- "The Shark", John Blight
- "Sea Level", John Blight
- "The Coral Reef", John Blight
- "Mending the Bridge", Douglas Stewart
- "Spider-Gums", Douglas Stewart
- "The Silkworms", Douglas Stewart
- "B Flat", Douglas Stewart
- "Hogan's Daughter", David Campbell
- "Spring Hares", David Campbell
- "The Australian Dream", David Campbell
- "To the Art of Edgar Degas", David Campbell
- "Mothers and Daughters", David Campbell
- "On Frosty Days", David Campbell
- "Pallid Cuckoo [I]", David Campbell
- "A Grey Singlet", David Campbell
- "Spring Lambs", David Campbell
- "The Little Grebe", David Campbell
- "Duchesses", David Campbell
- "The Secret Life of a Leader", David Campbell
- "The Tomb of Lt. John Learmonth, AIF", J. S. Manifold
- "The Unborn", Judith Wright
- "Woman to Man", Judith Wright
- "The Old Prison", Judith Wright
- "Train Journey", Judith Wright
- "Flood Year", Judith Wright
- "Flame-Tree in a Quarry", Judith Wright
- "At Lake Cooloolah At Cooloola", Judith Wright
- "Request to a Year", Judith Wright
- "For One Dying", Judith Wright
- "Finale", Judith Wright
- "Smalltown Dance", Judith Wright
- "30 Haiku", Harold Stewart
- "Terra Australis", James McAuley
- "The Incarnation of Sirius", James McAuley
- "Chorus III", James McAuley
- "One Tuesday in Summer", James McAuley
- "Because", James McAuley
- "Parish Church", James McAuley
- "Child with a Cockatoo", Rosemary Dobson
- "Cock Crow", Rosemary Dobson
- "Who?", Rosemary Dobson
- "New Music", Gwen Harwood
- "An Impromptu for Ann Jennings", Gwen Harwood
- "Night Thoughts : Baby and Demon", Gwen Harwood
- "Naked Vision", Gwen Harwood
- "A Music Lesson", Gwen Harwood
- "The Secret Life of Frogs", Gwen Harwood
- "The Twins", Gwen Harwood
- "Night and Dreams", Gwen Harwood
- "Crow-Call", Gwen Harwood
- "Five", Lex Banning
- "Photograph of an Actress, c. 1860", Nan McDonald
- "The Barren Ground", Nan McDonald
- "Meg's Song and Davie's Song", Eric Rolls
- "Morgan's Country", Francis Webb
- "The Gunner", Francis Webb
- "Five Days Old", Francis Webb
- "A Death at Winson Green", Francis Webb
- "Hospital Night", Francis Webb
- "Legionary Ants", Francis Webb
- "Pneumo-Encephalograph", Francis Webb
- "Ward Two : Harry", Francis Webb
- "Wild Honey", Francis Webb
- "The Great Poet Comes Here in Winter", Peter Porter
- "A Consumer's Report", Peter Porter
- "Affair of the Heart", Peter Porter
- "On the Train Between Wellington and Shrewsbury", Peter Porter
- "On First Looking into Chapman's Hesiod", Peter Porter
- "An Exequy", Peter Porter
- "What I Have Written I Have Written", Peter Porter
- "Alcestis and the Poet", Peter Porter
- "Drifters", Bruce Dawe
- "Homecoming", Bruce Dawe
- "The Rock-Thrower", Bruce Dawe
- "Katrina", Bruce Dawe
- "Wood-Eye", Bruce Dawe
- "At Shagger's Funeral", Bruce Dawe
- "At an Exhibition of Historical Paintings, Hobart", Vivian Smith
- "Tasmania", Vivian Smith
- "The Man Fern Near the Bus Stop", Vivian Smith
- "Edna's Hymn", Barry Humphries
- "In Light and Darkness", Chris Wallace-Crabbe
- "A Wintry Manifesto", Chris Wallace-Crabbe
- "Ruins of the City of Hay", Randolph Stow
- "Endymion", Randolph Stow
- "The Embarkation", Randolph Stow
- "The Land's Meaning", Randolph Stow
- "Convalescence", Randolph Stow
- "The Singing Bones", Randolph Stow
- "Frost-Parrots", Randolph Stow
- "The Princes' Land", Les Murray
- "Vindaloo in Merthyr Tydfil", Les Murray
- "The Broad Bean Sermon", Les Murray
- "The Action", Les Murray
- "The Buladelah-Taree Holiday Song Cycle", Les Murray
- "Immigrant Voyage", Les Murray
- "The Quality of Sprawl", Les Murray
- "Machine Portraits with Pendant Spaceman", Les Murray
- "The Mouthless Image of God in the Hunter-Colo Mountains", Les Murray
- "Time Travel", Les Murray
- "On Removing Spiderweb", Les Murray
- "Johnny Weissmuller Dead in Acapulco", Clive James
- "Kiev Waiting for the Mongol Hordes", Geoffrey Lehmann
- "Elegy for Jan", Geoffrey Lehmann
- "Out after Dark", Geoffrey Lehmann
- "Roses : I", Geoffrey Lehmann
- "Roses : II", Geoffrey Lehmann
- "Roses : III", Geoffrey Lehmann
- "Roses : IV", Geoffrey Lehmann
- "Roses : V", Geoffrey Lehmann
- "Roses : VI", Geoffrey Lehmann
- "Roses : VII", Geoffrey Lehmann
- "Roses : VIII", Geoffrey Lehmann
- "Roses : IX", Geoffrey Lehmann
- "Roses : X", Geoffrey Lehmann
- "Roses : XI", Geoffrey Lehmann
- "Roses : XII", Geoffrey Lehmann
- "Pear Days in Queensland", Geoffrey Lehmann
- "Children's Games", Geoffrey Lehmann
- "Harold's Walk", Geoffrey Lehmann
- "Grit : A Doxology", Geoff Page
- "My Mother's God", Geoff Page
- "Sickle Beach", Roger McDonald
- "Precise Invaders", Roger McDonald
- "Incident in Transylvania", Roger McDonald
- "The Hollow Thesaurus", Roger McDonald
- "Apis Mellifica", Roger McDonald
- "The Quote from Auden", Nigel Roberts
- "Reward / for a Missing Deity", Nigel Roberts
- "House and Home : Country Veranda : 1 : Dry Weather", John Tranter
- "House and Home : Country Veranda : 2 : Rain", John Tranter
- "Voodoo", John Tranter
- "Crosstalk", John Tranter
- "Anyone Home?", John Tranter
- "Study of a Squid", Caroline Caddy
- "Moonviewing", Caroline Caddy
- "To the Master Dogen Zenji (1200-1253 AD)", Robert Gray
- "Flames and Dangling Wire", Robert Gray
- "Pumpkins", Robert Gray
- "The Dusk", Robert Gray
- "Diptych", Robert Gray
- "Curriculum Vitae", Robert Gray
- "Description of a Walk", Robert Gray
- "The Pairing of Terns", Mark O'Connor
- "Hortus Botanicus : Planting the Dunk Botanic Gardens : an Old Trade (Planting the Dunk Botanic Gardens : The Job)", Mark O'Connor
- "Hortus Botanicus : Planting the Dunk Botanic Gardens : 'The Boss'", Mark O'Connor
- "Hortus Botanicus : Planting the Dunk Botanic Gardens : the Wet", Mark O'Connor
- "Hortus Botanicus : Planting the Dunk Botanic Gardens : Beginnings", Mark O'Connor
- "Hortus Botanicus : Planting the Dunk Botanic Gardens : the Butterfly Tunnel", Mark O'Connor
- "Hortus Botanicus : Planting the Dunk Botanic Gardens : the Enemy (Planting the Dunk Botanic Gardens : 'Simmo')", Mark O'Connor
- "Hortus Botanicus : Planting the Dunk Botanic Gardens : Defeats", Mark O'Connor
- "Hortus Botanicus : Planting the Dunk Botanic Gardens : Finishing", Mark O'Connor
- "Hortus Botanicus : Planting the Dunk Botanic Gardens : News (Planting the Dunk Botanic Gardens : Home Thoughts...)", Mark O'Connor
- "Profiles of My Father", Rhyll McMaster
- "Woman Crossing the Road", Rhyll McMaster
- "A Change of Season : After a Newsreel of a Himalayan Spring Ritual", Alan Gould
- "7: Galaxies", Alan Gould
- "Learning to Think (1960-66) : Taffy Evans", Alan Gould
- "The Scissors", Jamie Grant
- "Still Life with Desks", Jamie Grant
- "Daylight Moon", Jamie Grant
- "Skywriting", Jamie Grant
- "Yugoslav Story", Susan Hampton
- "Stranded in Paradise", Susan Hampton
- "On Seeing the First Flasher", Vicki Raymond
- "King Pineapple", Vicki Raymond
- "Office Drunks", Vicki Raymond
- "Don't Talk About Your Childhood", Vicki Raymond
- "Roaring Beach", Vicki Raymond
- "Rrose Selavy", John Forbes
- "Angel", John Forbes
- "Memories of Kampuchea", Peter Goldsworthy
- "Alcohol and I", Peter Goldsworthy
- "Suicide on Christmas Eve", Peter Goldsworthy
- "A Statistician to His Love", Peter Goldsworthy
- "Nadia Comanechi [Comaneci] : (Montreal, 1976)", Kevin Hart
- "A History of the Future", Kevin Hart
- "The Gift", Kevin Hart
- "Walking Through the Crop", Philip Hodgins
- "The Birds", Philip Hodgins
- "Chopped Prose with Pigs", Philip Hodgins
- "Shooting the Dogs", Philip Hodgins
- "Kristallnacht", Jemal Sharah

== Critical reception ==
Rosemary Sorensen, reviewing the anthology for The Age newspaper, noted that it is "tastless", having been in the compilation stage for too long. She also commented on the omission of so many poets who might well have been included.

Heather Cam, in The Sydney Morning Herald agreed, commenting that it "noticeably under-represents, or excludes outright generally ackowledged, significant and proven voices" from various geographic areas of the country, "and the opposite sex."

== See also ==
- 1991 in Australian literature
