= Because (McAuley poem) =

Poem by James McAuley

- by James McAuley
- First published in: Australian Poetry 1968
- Country: Australia
- Language: English
- Publication date: 1968
- Lines: 40

"Because" is a poem by Australian poet James McAuley.

It was first published in the anthology Australian Poetry 1968 edited by Dorothy Auchterlonie, and later in several of the author's collections and in other Australian poetry anthologies.

== Outline ==
The poet looks back at his childhood, and at his parents, and notes that they lived a life of restraint, duty and self-discipline that was very prevalent in Australia between the World Wars. They were good people, with limitations.

== Analysis ==
Noel Rowe wrote about McAuley's poetry in an essay for Southerly titled "James McAuley: The Possibility of Despair" and commented that the poem "wants a final reason for human sorrow", and that "it seems to be coming to terms with limited parents and limited love".

In his commentary on the poem in 60 Classic Australian Poems Geoff Page noted that "McAuley seems almost to be musing to himself – or, perhaps more accurately, confiding to a trusted friend about the limitations of his childhood and their permanent impact."

== Further publications ==
After its initial publication in the Australian Poetry 1968 anthology in 1968, the poem was reprinted as follows:

- Surprises of the Sun by James McAuley, Angus and Robertson, 1969
- Collected Poems 1936-1970 by James McAuley, Angus and Robertson, 1971
- The Penguin Book of Australian Verse edited by Harry Heseltine, Penguin Books, 1972
- Australian Verse from 1805 : A Continuum edited by Geoffrey Dutton, 1976
- The Golden Apples of the Sun : Twentieth Century Australian Poetry edited by Chris Wallace-Crabbe, Melbourne University Press, 1980
- The Collins Book of Australian Poetry edited by Rodney Hall, Collins, 1981
- The World's Contracted Thus edited by J. A. McKenzie and J. K. McKenzie, Heinemann Education, 1983
- The Illustrated Treasury of Australian Verse edited by Beatrice Davis, Nelson, 1984
- Cross-Country : A Book of Australian Verse edited by John Barnes and Brian MacFarlane, Heinemann, 1984
- My Country: Australian Poetry and Short Stories, Two Hundred Years edited by Leonie Kramer, Lansdowne, 1985
- The New Oxford Book of Australian Verse edited by Les Murray, Oxford University Press, 1986
- Two Centuries of Australian Poetry edited by Mark O’Connor, Oxford University Press, 1988
- James McAuley: Poetry, Essay and Personal Commentary edited by Leonie Kranmer, University of Queensland Press, 1988
- The Macmillan Anthology of Australian Literature edited by Ken L. Goodwin and Alan Lawson, Macmillan, 1990
- The Penguin Book of Modern Australian Poetry edited by John Tranter and Philip Mead, Penguin, 1991
- Australian Poetry in the Twentieth Century edited by Robert Gray and Geoffrey Lehmann, Heinemann, 1991
- Collected Poems by James McAuley, Angus and Robertson, 1994
- Fivefathers: Five Australian Poets of the Pre-Academic Era edited by Les Murray, Carcanet, 1994
- The Oxford Book of Modern Australian Verse edited by Peter Porter, Oxford University Press, 1996
- Family Ties: Australian Poems of the Family edited by Jennifer Strauss, Oxford University Press, 1998
- Australian Verse: An Oxford Anthology edited by John Leonard, Oxford University Press, 1998
- Seven Centuries of Poetry in English edited by John Leonard, Oxford University Press, 2003
- The Canberra Times 4 June 2005
- 80 Great Poems from Chaucer to Now edited by Geoff Page, University of NSW Press, 2006
- 100 Australian Poems You Need to Know edited by Jamie Grant, Hardie Grant, 2008
- 60 Classic Australian Poems edited by Geoff Page, University of NSW Press, 2009
- The Puncher & Wattmann Anthology of Australian Poetry edited by John Leonard, Puncher & Wattmann, 2009
- Australian Poetry Since 1788 edited by Geoffrey Lehmann and Robert Gray, University of NSW Press, 2011

== Note ==
- You can read the full text of the poem on the Poem Hunter website

== See also ==
- 1968 in poetry
- 1968 in literature
- 1968 in Australian literature
- Australian literature
