= The Tomb of Lt. John Learmonth, AIF =

Poem by J. S. Manifold

- by J. S. Manifold
- First published in: New Republic
- Country: Australia
- Language: English
- Publication date: 10 September 1945
- Preceded by: Trident (poetry collection)
- Followed by: Selected Verse (poetry collection)

The Tomb of Lt. John Learmonth, AIF is a poem by Australian poet J. S. Manifold. It was first published in New Republic magazine on 10 September 1945, and later in the poet's poetry collections Collected Verse (1978), and On My Selection : Poems (1983). The poem has subsequently been published numerous times in various Australian poetry anthologies.

== Outline ==
The poem was written in memory of a school friend of the poet's who had been captured by the Germans in Crete in the Second World War, and who later died in the prison camp.

== Analysis ==
The Oxford Companion to Australian Literature noted: "...the poem is both a tribute to the unpretentious quality of common human heroism as exemplified in John Learmonth's hopeless stand against the Germans in Crete and a linking of that courage to 'the old heroic virtues' that are part of Australia's past."

In a review of the poet's collection On My Selection, Susan McKernan in The Canberra Times noted: "'John Learmonth' is a wonderful poem which manages the difficult task of being patriotic without being chauvinistic, of praising courage in war without praising war."

== See also ==
- 1945 in poetry
- 1945 in literature
- 1945 in Australian literature
- Australian literature

== Notes ==
The poem was written when the poet was involved in the German offensive in the Ardennes in 1944.

== Further publications ==
- A Book of Australian Verse edited by Judith Wright (1956)
- The Penguin Book of Australian Verse edited by John Thompson, Kenneth Slessor and R. G. Howarth (1958)
- The Penguin Book of Australian Verse edited by Harry Payne Heseltine (1972)
- Australian Verse from 1805 : A Continuum edited by Geoffrey Dutton (1976)
- Collected Verse by J. S. Manifold (1978)
- The Golden Apples of the Sun : Twentieth Century Australian Poetry edited by Chris Wallace-Crabbe (1980)
- The Collins Book of Australian Poetry edited by Rodney Hall (1981)
- On My Selection : Poems by John Manifold (1983)
- Clubbing of the Gunfire : 101 Australian War Poems edited by Chris Wallace-Crabbe and Peter Pierce (1984)
- Cross-Country : A Book of Australian Verse edited by John Barnes and Brian MacFarlane, Heinemann, 1988
- The Australian Experience of War : Illustrated Stories and Verse edited by J. T. Laird (1988)
- Peace and War : A Collection of Poems Michael Harrison and Christopher Stuart-Clark (1989)
- My Country : Australian Poetry and Short Stories, Two Hundred Years edited by Leonie Kramer (1991)
- The Faber Book of Modern Australian Verse edited by Vincent Buckley (1991)
- Australian Poetry in the Twentieth Century edited by Robert Gray and Geoffrey Lehmann, Heinemann, 1991
- The Voice of War : Poems of the Second World War : The Oasis Collection edited by Victor Selwyn (1995)
- The Oxford Book of Modern Australian Verse edited by Peter Porter (1996)
- Second World War Poems edited by Hugh Haughton (2004)
- 100 Australian Poems You Need to Know edited by Jamie Grant (2008)
- The Penguin Anthology of Australian Poetry edited by John Kinsella (2009)
- Macquarie PEN Anthology of Australian Literature edited by Nicholas Jose, Kerryn Goldsworthy, Anita Heiss, David McCooey, Peter Minter, Nicole Moore and Elizabeth Webby (2009)
- The Puncher & Wattmann Anthology of Australian Poetry edited by John Leonard (2009)
- Australian Poetry Since 1788 edited byGeoffrey Lehmann and Robert Gray (2011)
