= The Orange Tree =

Poem by John Shaw Neilson

- by John Shaw Neilson
- First published in: The Bookfellow, 15 February 1921
- Country: Australia
- Language: English
- Publication date: 1921
- Lines: 40

Full text
- The Orange Tree at Wikisource

"The Orange Tree" is a poem by Australian poet John Shaw Neilson. It was first published in The Bookfellow on 15 February 1921, and later in the poet's collections and other Australian poetry anthologies.

== Outline ==
A young girl is in conversation with the narrator of the poem and discusses the light that is "not of the sky" that lies within the orange grove they see.

== Analysis ==
The Oxford Companion to Australian Literature states that the poem was "inspired by the beauty of the orange groves at Merbein near Mildura in the Murray River irrigration area". It goes on to note that the poem "has sometimes been interpreted as youth's innate understanding of the natural beauty of life".

A writer in The Cambridge History of Australian Literature described the poem as "symbolism with its sleeves rolled up".

== Further publications ==
- An Australasian Anthology : Australian and New Zealand Poems edited by Percival Serle, R. H. Croll, and Frank Wilmot, Collins, 1927
- Collected Poems of John Shaw Neilson edited by R. H. Croll, Lothian, 1934
- An Anthology of Australian Verse edited by George Mackaness, Angus & Robertson, 1952
- The Boomerang Book of Australian Poetry edited by Enid Moodie Heddle, Longmans Green, 1956
- A Book of Australian Verse edited by Judith Wright, Oxford University Press, 1956
- New Land, New Language : An Anthology of Australian Verse edited by Judith Wright, Oxford University Press, 1957
- The Penguin Book of Australian Verse edited by John Thompson, Kenneth Slessor and R. G. Howarth, Penguin Books, 1958
- From the Ballads to Brennan edited by T. Inglis Moore, Angus & Robertson, 1964
- The Penguin Book of Australian Verse edited by Harry Heseltine, Penguin Books, 1972
- The Golden Apples of the Sun : Twentieth Century Australian Poetry edited by Chris Wallace-Crabbe, Melbourne University Press, 1980
- The Collins Book of Australian Poetry edited by Rodney Hall, Collins, 1981
- The World's Contracted Thus edited by J. A. McKenzie and J. K. McKenzie, Heinemann Education, 1983
- The Illustrated Treasury of Australian Verse edited by Beatrice Davis, Nelson, 1984
- Cross-Country : A Book of Australian Verse edited by John Barnes and Brian MacFarlane, Heinemann, 1984
- My Country : Australian Poetry and Short Stories, Two Hundred Years edited by Leonie Kramer, Lansdowne, 1985
- The Macmillan Anthology of Australian Literature edited by Ken L. Goodwin and Alan Lawson, Macmillan, 1990
- The Faber Book of Modern Australian Verse edited by Vincent Buckley, Faber, 1991
- Selected Poems by John Shaw Neilson, Angus and Robertson, 1993
- The Illustrated Treasury of Australian Verse edited by Beatrice Davis, State Library of NSW Press, 1996
- Australian Verse : An Oxford Anthology edited by John Leonard, Oxford University Press, 1998
- Our Country : Classic Australian Poetry : From Colonial Ballads to Paterson & Lawson edited by Michael Cook, Little Hills Press, 2002
- Hell and After : Four Early English-language Poets of Australia edited by Les Murray, Carcanet 2005
- An Anthology of Australian Poetry to 1920 edited by John Kinsella, University of Western Australia Library, 2007
- 100 Australian Poems You Need to Know edited by Jamie Grant, Hardie Grant, 2008
- The Penguin Anthology of Australian Poetry edited by John Kinsella, Penguin, 2009
- 60 Classic Australian Poems edited by Geoff Page, University of NSW Press, 2009
- Macquarie PEN Anthology of Australian Literature edited by Nicholas Jose, Kerryn Goldsworthy, Anita Heiss, David McCooey, Peter Minter, Nicole Moore, and Elizabeth Webby, Allen and Unwin, 2009
- The Puncher & Wattmann Anthology of Australian Poetry edited by John Leonard, Puncher & Wattmann, 2009
- Australian Poetry Since 1788 edited by Geoffrey Lehmann and Robert Gray, University of NSW Press, 2011
- Collected Verse of John Shaw Neilson by John Shaw Neilson, UWA Publishing, 2012

The poem was also translated into Arabic in 1999.

== See also ==
- 1921 in poetry
- 1921 in literature
- 1921 in Australian literature
- Australian literature
