= The Farmer Remembers the Somme =

1920 poem by Australian poet Vance Palmer

- by Vance Palmer
- Country: Australia
- Language: English
- Publisher: Birth : A Little Journal of Australian Poetry
- Publication date: April 1920
- Lines: 15

"The Farmer Remembers the Somme" (1920) is a poem by Australian writer Vance Palmer.

It was originally published in Birth : A Little Journal of Australian Poetry vol. 4 no. 41 in April 1920, and was subsequently reprinted in a collection of the writer's poetry and in a number of Australian poetry anthologies.

== Synopsis ==
An Australian soldier has returned home to work on his farm but is haunted by his memories of the fighting at the Battle of the Somme, "the misty figures endlessly coming" and "the dark Somme flowing".

== Critical reception ==
In writing about Palmer's collection The Camp in his critical work Vance Plamer Harry Heseltine noted the author's "increasing poetic skill" in this work and commented that "it is important as an early instance of a recurrent theme in Palmer's writing — the deep psychological malaise induced by participation in the war. In itself, it is one of Palmer's few exercises in dramatized versification, and, on most counts, stands as the best poem he ever wrote".

== Publication history ==
After the poem's initial publication in the journal Birth in April 1920 it was reprinted as follows:

- The Camp by Vance Palmer, Sydney J. Endacott, 1920
- The Australian Poetry Annual, 1920, The Literary Club
- The Sydney Stock and Station Journal, 14 January 1921
- A Book of Queensland Verse edited by J. J. Stable and A. E. M. Kirwood, Queensland Book Depot, 1924
- An Australasian Anthology : Australian and New Zealand Poems edited by Percival Serle, R. H. Croll, and Frank Wilmot, Collins, 1927
- Poets of Australia : An Anthology of Australian Verse edited by George Mackaness, Angus & Robertson, 1946
- An Anthology of Australian Verse edited by George Mackaness, Angus & Robertson, 1952
- Modern Australian Poetry edited by H. M. Green, Melbourne University Press, 1952
- The Queensland Centenary Anthology edited by Val Vallis and R. S. Byrnes, 1959
- From the Ballads to Brennan edited by T. Inglis Moore, Angus & Robertson, 1964
- Silence Into Song : An Anthology of Australian Verse edited by Clifford O'Brien, Rigby, 1968
- Bards in the Wilderness : Australian Colonial Poetry to 1920 edited by Adrian Mitchell and Brian Elliott, Nelson, 1970
- Other Banners : An Anthology of Australian Literature of the First World War edited by J. T. Laird, Australian War Memorial and The Australian Publishing Service, 1971
- The Penguin Book of Australian Verse edited by Harry Heseltine, Penguin Books, 1972
- The Golden Apples of the Sun : Twentieth Century Australian Poetry edited by Chris Wallace-Crabbe, Melbourne University Press, 1980
- Clubbing the Gunfire edited by Chris Wallace-Crabbe and Peter Pierce, Melbourne University Press, 1984
- My Country : Australian Poetry and Short Stories, Two Hundred Years edited by Leonie Kramer, Lansdowne, 1985
- The New Oxford Book of Australian Verse edited by Les Murray, Oxford University Press, 1986
- The Australian Experience of War : Illustrated Stories and Verse edited by J. T. Laird, Mead & Beckett, 1988
- Australian Poetry : Tradition & Challenge edited by Dot Jensen, Nelson, 1988
- Sunlines : An Anthology of Poetry to Celebrate Australia's Harmony in Diversity edited by Anne Fairbairn, Dept of Immigration and Multicultural and Indigenous Affairs, 2002
- The Penguin Anthology of Australian Poetry edited by John Kinsella, Penguin, 2009
- Australian Poetry Since 1788 edited by Geoffrey Lehmann and Robert Gray, University of NSW Press, 2011
- This is Home : Essential Australian Poems for Children edited by Jackie French, National Library of Australia, 2019

== See also ==
- 1920 in Australian literature
- 1920 in poetry
