= Harry (poem) =

1962 poem by Australian poet Francis Webb

- by Francis Webb
- Written: 1962
- First published in: Meanjin Quarterly vol. 21 no. 1, March 1962
- Country: Australia
- Language: English
- Series: Ward Two
- Publication date: March 1962
- Lines: 43

"Harry" (1962) is a poem by Australian poet Francis Webb.

It was originally published in the journal Meanjin Quarterly vol. 21 no. 1, March 1962, and was subsequently reprinted in the author's single-author collections and a number of Australian poetry anthologies.

The poem forms a part of the poet's Ward Two sequence of 8 poems.

== Synopsis ==
Harry, the subject of the poem, is a young man with Down syndrome who is confined to a mental health institution. He is attempting to write a letter with "purloined paper" and a "bent insitutional pen". The letter will be directed "to the House of no known address." This implies that he has written such a letter before but that it was returned.

The poet's Ward Two sequence of poems is based on the time that Francis Webb spent as a patient in Parramatta Psychiatric Hospital in 1960-61.

== Critical reception ==
Andrew Taylor, in his chapter on Webb in his book Reading Australian Poetry, stated the "poem leaves us in no doubt that Harry is not only innocent of literacy, he is also innocent of the fallen condition of his world". The poem "leaves us in no doubt that by failing to write [the letter] Harry has avoided the fall from primal innocence and communion with holiness."

In his commentary on the poem in 60 Classic Australian Poems Geoff Page noted that while Webb wrote "quite a few more 'ambitious poems'" it is this poem, "with its deeply felt religious imagery – and its 'laborious serfs' – that we see Webb at his most moving and most interesting."

== Publication history ==
After the poem's initial publication Meanjin Quarterly in 1962 it was reprinted as follows:

- Australian Poetry 1962 edited by Geoffrey Dutton, Angus and Robertson, 1962
- The Ghost of the Cock : Poems by Francis Webb, Angus and Robertson, 1964
- Modern Australian Writing edited by Geoffrey Dutton, Collins, 1966
- On Native Grounds : Australian Writing from Meanjin Quarterly edited by C. B. Christesen, Angus and Robertson, 1967
- A Book of Australian Verse edited by Judith Wright, Oxford University Press, 1968
- New Impulses in Australian Poetry edited by Rodney Hall and Thomas Shapcott, University of Queensland Press, 1968
- Collected Poems by Francis Webb, Angus and Robertson, 1969
- Twelve Poets, 1950-1970 edited by Alexander Craig, Jacaranda Press, 1971
- The Penguin Book of Australian Verse edited by Harry Heseltine, Penguin Books, 1972
- Australian Verse from 1805 : A Continuum edited by Geoffrey Dutton, Rigby, 1976
- The Golden Apples of the Sun : Twentieth Century Australian Poetry edited by Chris Wallace-Crabbe, Melbourne University Press, 1980
- The Collins Book of Australian Poetry edited by Rodney Hall, Collins, 1981
- Anthology of Australian Religious Poetry edited by Les Murray, Collins Dove, 1986
- Contemporary Australian Poetry: An Anthology edited by John Leonard, Houghton Mifflin, 1990
- An Anthology of Commonwealth Poetry edited by C. D. Narasimhaiah, Macmillan, 1990
- The Penguin Book of Modern Australian Poetry edited by John Tranter and Philip Mead, Penguin, 1991
- Cap and Bells : The Poetry of Francis Webb edited by Michael Joseph Griffith and James A. McGlade, Angus and Robertson, 1991
- Australian Poetry in the Twentieth Century edited by Robert Gray and Geoffrey Lehmann, Heinemann, 1991
- Fivefathers : Five Australian Poets of the Pre-Academic Era edited by Les Murray, Carcanet, 1994
- Australian Verse : An Oxford Anthology edited by John Leonard, Oxford University Press, 1998
- 60 Classic Australian Poems edited by Geoff Page, University of NSW Press, 2009
- Macquarie PEN Anthology of Australian Literature edited by Nicholas Jose, Kerryn Goldsworthy, Anita Heiss, David McCooey, Peter Minter, Nicole Moore, and Elizabeth Webby, Allen and Unwin, 2009
- The Puncher & Wattmann Anthology of Australian Poetry edited by John Leonard, Puncher & Wattmann, 2009
- Australian Poetry Since 1788 edited by Geoffrey Lehmann and Robert Gray, University of NSW Press, 2011
- Island, no. 126, Spring 2011

== Notes ==
- You can read the full text of the poem via the Informit website, or on the Island magazine archived website.

== See also ==
- 1962 in Australian literature
- 1962 in poetry
