= Woman to Man (poem) =

1946 poem by Australian poet Judith Wright

- by Judith Wright
- Written: 1946
- First published in: Meanjin Papers
- Country: Australia
- Language: English
- Publication date: Spring 1946
- Lines: 20

"Woman to Man" (1946) is a poem by Australian poet Judith Wright.

It was originally published in Meanjin Papers in Spring 1946, and was subsequently reprinted in the author's single-author collections and a number of Australian poetry anthologies.

== Synopsis ==
"The eyeless laborer in the night", of the first line of the poem, is the unborn foetus of a pregnancy that Wright thought she would never experience, as she had been told as a teenager that she would never have children.

== Critical reception ==
Writing on the Red Page of The Bulletin a reviewer commented that this poem "moves into midnight...and there, in a midnight which represents the darkness where the unborn child takes shape,...and the darkness of death, and the darkness of not-being in which the unborn embryo, dead at the beginning of its life-cycle...there in that midnight at once creative and destructive, the primal midnight of the universe, life and death wrestle in the book".

== Publication history ==
After the poem's initial publication in Meanjin Papers it was reprinted as follows:

- Australian Poetry 1947 edited by Frederick T. Macartney, Angus and Robertson, 1948
- Voices : A Quarterly of Poetry, Spring 1948
- Woman to Man by Judith Wright, Angus and Robertson, 1949
- Modern Australian Poetry edited by H. M. Green, Melbourne University Press, 1952
- A Book of Australian Verse edited by Judith Wright, Oxford University Press, 1956
- The Penguin Book of Australian Verse edited by John Thompson, Kenneth Slessor and R. G. Howarth, Penguin Books, 1958
- Five Senses: Selected Poems by Judith Wright, Angus and Robertson, 1963
- Judith Wright : Selected Poems by Judith Wright, Angus and Robertson, 1963
- Six Voices: Contemporary Australian Poets edited by Chris Wallace-Crabbe, Angus and Robertson, 1963
- Modern Australian Verse edited by Douglas Stewart, Angus and Robertson, 1964
- A Book of Australian Verse edited by Judith Wright, Oxford University Press, 1968
- Judith Wright : Collected Poems, 1942-1970 by Judith Wright, Angus and Robertson, 1971
- The Penguin Book of Australian Verse edited by Harry Heseltine, Penguin Books, 1972
- Australian Verse from 1805 : A Continuum edited by Geoffrey Dutton, Rigby, 1976
- The Golden Apples of the Sun : Twentieth Century Australian Poetry edited by Chris Wallace-Crabbe, Melbourne University Press, 1980
- The Collins Book of Australian Poetry edited by Rodney Hall, Collins, 1981
- Cross-Country : A Book of Australian Verse edited by John Barnes and Brian MacFarlane, Heinemann, 1984
- The Illustrated Treasury of Australian Verse edited by Beatrice Davis, Nelson, 1984
- My Country : Australian Poetry and Short Stories, Two Hundred Years edited by Leonie Kramer, Lansdowne, 1985
- Two Centuries of Australian Poetry edited by Mark O’Connor, Oxford University Press, 1988
- The Macmillan Anthology of Australian Literature edited by Ken L. Goodwin and Alan Lawson, Macmillan, 1990
- A Human Pattern : Selected Poems by Judith Wright, Angus and Robertson, 1990
- Australian Poetry in the Twentieth Century edited by Robert Gray and Geoffrey Lehmann, Heinemann, 1991
- The Faber Book of Modern Australian Verse edited by Vincent Buckley, Faber, 1991
- The Penguin Book of Modern Australian Poetry edited by John Tranter and Philip Mead, Penguin, 1991
- Collected Poems 1942-1985 by Judith Wright, Angus and Robertson, 1994
- The Oxford Book of Australian Women's Verse edited by Susan Lever, 1995
- Bridgings : Readings in Australian Women's Poetry edited by Rose Lucas and Lyn McCredden, Oxford Uuiversity Press, 1996
- Australian Verse : An Oxford Anthology edited by John Leonard, Oxford University Press, 1998
- Two Centuries of Australian Poetry edited by Kathrine Bell, Gary Allen, 2007
- Grace and Other Poems by Judith Wright, Picaro Press, 2009
- Macquarie PEN Anthology of Australian Literature edited by Nicholas Jose, Kerryn Goldsworthy, Anita Heiss, David McCooey, Peter Minter, Nicole Moore, and Elizabeth Webby, Allen and Unwin, 2009
- The Puncher & Wattmann Anthology of Australian Poetry edited by John Leonard, Puncher & Wattmann, 2009
- 100 Australian Poems of Love and Loss edited by Jamie Grant, Hardie Grant Books, 2011
- Australian Poetry Since 1788 edited by Geoffrey Lehmann and Robert Gray, University of NSW Press, 2011
- Love is Strong as Death edited by Paul Kelly, Hamish Hamilton, 2019

== See also ==
- 1946 in Australian literature
- 1946 in poetry
