= The Night-Ride =

1926 poem by Australian poet Kenneth Slessor

- by Kenneth Slessor
- First published in: Earth-Visitors : Poems
- Country: Australia
- Language: English
- Publication date: 1926

"The Night-Ride" (1926) is a poem by Australian poet Kenneth Slessor.

It was originally published in the poet's collection Earth-Visitors : Poems, and was subsequently reprinted in the author's single-author collections and a number of Australian poetry anthologies.

== Synopsis ==
The poem starts with a passenger on a train, watching other passengers on the platform, and waiting for the train to leave the station. Then the train moves off and the passenger pulls down the window blind and sleeps.

== Critical reception ==
Chris Wallace-Crabbe stated that the poem "is successful not because Slessor has bluntly set out to find a viable analogy for his vision of life, but because it starts from a clear definition of local and specific perceptions. His magnificent verbal gifts are no longer wasted on the erection of pleasure domes in Neverneverland, but are devoted to recording the colours, shapes, surfaces of familiar things."

In his book Reading Australian Poetry Andrew Taylor commented "Slessor has been constantly praised for the immediacy of his observation of physical detail, a quality as apparent in 'The Night-Ride' as anywhere else."

== Publication history ==
After the poem's initial publication in Earth-Visitors : Poems in 1926 it was reprinted as follows:

- One Hundred Poems : 1919–1939 by Kenneth Slessor, Angus and Robertson, 1944
- The Boomerang Book of Australian Poetry edited by Enid Moodie Heddle, Longmans Green, 1956
- New Land, New Language : An Anthology of Australian Verse edited by Judith Wright, Oxford University Press, 1957
- Silence Into Song : An Anthology of Australian Verse edited by Clifford O'Brien, Rigby, 1968
- The Penguin Book of Australian Verse edited by Harry Heseltine, Penguin Books, 1972
- Poems by Kenneth Slessor, Angus and Robertson, 1975
- The Golden Apples of the Sun : Twentieth Century Australian Poetry edited by Chris Wallace-Crabbe, Melbourne University Press, 1980
- The World's Contracted Thus edited by J. A. McKenzie and J. K. McKenzie, Heinemann Education, 1983
- Cross-Country : A Book of Australian Verse edited by John Barnes and Brian MacFarlane, Heinemann, 1984
- My Country : Australian Poetry and Short Stories, Two Hundred Years edited by Leonie Kramer, Lansdowne, 1985
- Two Centuries of Australian Poetry edited by Mark O’Connor, Oxford University Press, 1988
- The Faber Book of Modern Australian Verse edited by Vincent Buckley, Faber, 1991
- The Penguin Book of Modern Australian Poetry edited by John Tranter and Philip Mead, Penguin, 1991
- Kenneth Slessor : Poetry, Essays, War Despatches, War Diaries, Journalism, Autobiographical Material and Letters edited by Dennis Haskell, University of Queensland Press, 1991
- Australian Poetry in the Twentieth Century edited by Robert Gray and Geoffrey Lehmann, Heinemann, 1991
- Fivefathers : Five Australian Poets of the Pre-Academic Era edited by Les Murray, Carcanet, 1994
- Kenneth Slessor : Collected Poems by Kenneth Slessor, Angus and Robertson, 1994
- The Arnold Anthology of Post-Colonial Literatures in English edited by John Thieme, Arnold, 1996
- Australian Verse : An Oxford Anthology edited by John Leonard, Oxford University Press, 1998
- The Puncher & Wattmann Anthology of Australian Poetry edited by John Leonard, Puncher & Wattmann, 2009
- Australian Poetry Since 1788 edited by Geoffrey Lehmann and Robert Gray, University of NSW Press, 2011
- Sense, Shape, Symbol : An Investigation of Australian Poetry edited by Brian Keyte, Phoenix Education, 2013
- Love is Strong as Death edited by Paul Kelly, Hamish Hamilton, 2019

== Notes ==
- You can read the full text of the poem on the All Poetry website.

== See also ==
- 1926 in Australian literature
- 1926 in poetry
