= Beach Burial =

1944 poem by Australian poet Kenneth Slessor

- by Kenneth Slessor
- Written: 1944
- First published in: Southerly
- Country: Australia
- Language: English
- Publication date: 1944
- Lines: 21

"Beach Burial" (1944) is a poem by Australian poet Kenneth Slessor.

It was originally published in Southerly journal in 1944, and was not reprinted in the author's single-author collections and a number of Australian poetry anthologies.

The poem was written around the time of the battle of El Alamein in 1942 while Slessor was a war correspondent. It reflects his experience of seeing dead seamen being pulled from the surf and buried in the sand in graves marked with a cross bearing the words "Unknown Seaman".

== Critical reception ==
The Oxford Companion to Australian Literature called it a "fine poem which reflects the futility of war, it expresses the bewildered pity of battle-hardened troops as they perform rough and ready but deeply-tender last rites over the sodden, nameless corpses."

The Oxford Literary History of Australia stated that the poem was "notable for its formal experimentation with assonance, echo and half-rhyme."

In his commentary on the poem in 60 Classic Australian Poems editor Geoff Page noted that this "is not a poem of strident assertion; it is a poem of 'perplexity', of 'bewildered pity, rather than a song of praise to the 'cause'". He concluded that "poems rarely come more perfect than this one."

== Publication history ==
After the poem's initial publication in Southerly it was reprinted as follows:

- Australian Poetry 1944 edited by R. G. Howarth (1945)
- The Australasian Book News and Literary Journal vol. 2 no. 7, January 1948
- An Anthology of Australian Verse edited by George Mackaness, Angus & Robertson, 1952
- A Book of Australian Verse edited by Judith Wright, Oxford University Press, 1956
- Poems by Kenneth Slessor, Angus and Robertson, 1957
- The Penguin Book of Australian Verse edited by John Thompson, Kenneth Slessor and R. G. Howarth, Penguin Books, 1958
- Modern Australian Verse edited by Douglas Stewart, Angus and Robertson, 1964
- The Age, 29 October 1966, p23
- The Penguin Book of Australian Verse edited by Harry Heseltine, Penguin Books, 1972
- Australian Verse from 1805 : A Continuum edited by Geoffrey Dutton, 1976
- The Golden Apples of the Sun : Twentieth Century Australian Poetry edited by Chris Wallace-Crabbe, Melbourne University Press, 1980
- The Collins Book of Australian Poetry edited by Rodney Hall, Collins, 1981
- Clubbing of the Gunfire : 101 Australian War Poems edited by Chris Wallace-Crabb and Peter Pierce, Melbourne University Press, 1984
- My Country : Australian Poetry and Short Stories, Two Hundred Years edited by Leonie Kramer, Lansdowne, 1985
- Fighting Words : Australian War Writing edited by Carl Harrison-Ford, Lothian, 1986
- Two Centuries of Australian Poetry edited by Mark O’Connor, Oxford University Press, 1988
- Cross-Country : A Book of Australian Verse edited by John Barnes and Brian MacFarlane, Heinemann, 1988
- The Sea Poems of Kenneth Slessor by Kenneth Slessor, Briundabella Press, 1990
- The Penguin Book of Modern Australian Poetry edited by John Tranter and Philip Mead, Penguin, 1991
- The Faber Book of Modern Australian Verse edited by Vincent Buckley, Faber, 1991
- Australian Poetry in the Twentieth Century edited by Robert Gray and Geoffrey Lehmann, Heinemann, 1991
- Fivefathers : Five Australian Poets of the Pre-Academic Era edited by Les Murray, Carcanet, 1994
- The Voice of War : Poems of the Second World War : The Oasis Collection edited by Victor Selwyn, Penguin, 1995
- The Illustrated Treasury of Australian Verse edited by Beatrice Davis, State Library of NSW Press, 1996
- Australian Verse : An Oxford Anthology edited by John Leonard, Oxford University Press, 1998
- Two Centuries of Australian Poetry edited by Kathrine Bell, Gary Allen, 2007
- The Penguin Anthology of Australian Poetry edited by John Kinsella, Penguin, 2009
- 60 Classic Australian Poems edited by Geoff Page, University of NSW Press, 2009
- Macquarie PEN Anthology of Australian Literature edited by Nicholas Jose, Kerryn Goldsworthy, Anita Heiss, David McCooey, Peter Minter, Nicole Moore, and Elizabeth Webby, Allen and Unwin, 2009
- The Puncher & Wattmann Anthology of Australian Poetry edited by John Leonard, Puncher & Wattmann, 2009
- Australian Poetry Since 1788 edited by Geoffrey Lehmann and Robert Gray, University of NSW Press, 2011

The poem has also been translated into Greek (1986), Indonesian (1991), and Arabic (1999).

== Notes ==
You can read the full text of the poem in The Age, 29 October 1966, p23 and also on the AllPoetry website.

== See also ==
- 1944 in Australian literature
- 1944 in poetry
