= The Year of the Foxes =

1969 poem by Australian poet David Malouf

- by David Malouf
- Country: Australia
- Language: English
- Publisher: Poetry Australia
- Publication date: June 1969
- Lines: 38

"The Year of the Foxes" (1969) is a poem by Australian poet David Malouf.

It was originally published in Poetry Australia no. 28, in June 1969, and was subsequently reprinted in the poet's single-author collections as well as a number of Australian poetry anthologies.

== Synopsis ==
The poem is told from the point-of-view of the ten-year-old poet, living in Brisbane during the Second World War. He watches the women of his neighborhood who return home with their new fox-furs and US G.I. escorts.

In an interview with Ray Willbanks for Antipodes magazine in 1990, Malouf called this work "a straightforward autobiographical poem".

== Critical reception ==
In an essay on Malouf's poetry Dennis Haskell noted of this poem that "the tone of the lines gives Malouf's point of view a firm aura of authenticity, and it is characteristic of him to see in the value-laden nature of language not alienation but imaginative possibilities."

In his commentary on the poem in 60 Classic Australian Poems Geoff Page commented that "the irony of the poem remains that all these things were first seen by the ten-year-old, who may not have fully comprehended them but was nevertheless aware that he would need to store them for later processing."

== Publication history ==
After the poem's initial publication in Poetry Australia in June 1969 it was reprinted as follows:

- Bicycle and Other Poems by David Malouf, University of Queensland Press, 1970
- We Took Their Orders and Are Dead : An Anti-War Anthology edited by Shirley Cass, Ros Cheney, David Malouf, and Michael Wilding, Ure Smith, 1971
- Australian Poetry 1971 edited by Chris Wallace-Crabbe, Angus and Robertson, 1971
- Gesture of a Hand edited by David Malouf, Holt, Rinehart and Winston, 1975
- Australian Verse from 1805 : A Continuum edited by Geoffrey Dutton, Rigby, 1976
- The Year of the Foxes and Other Poems by David Malouf, George Braziller, 1979
- The Golden Apples of the Sun : Twentieth Century Australian Poetry edited by Chris Wallace-Crabbe, Melbourne University Press, 1980
- Selected Poems by David Malouf, Angus and Robertson, 1981
- Clubbing the Gunfire edited by Chris Wallace-Crabbe and Peter Pierce, Melbourne University Press, 1984
- The Penguin Book of Australian Humorous Verse edited by Bill Scott, Penguin, 1984
- The New Oxford Book of Australian Verse edited by Les Murray, Oxford University Press, 1986
- David Malouf : Johnno, Short Stories, Poems, Essays and Interview edited by Jim Tulip, University of Queensland Press, 1990
- An Anthology of Commonwealth Poetry edited by C. D. Narasimhaiah, Macmillan, 1990
- The Faber Book of Modern Australian Verse edited by Vincent Buckley, Faber, 1991
- Poems 1959-1989 by David Malouf, University of Queensland Press, 1992
- Family Ties : Australian Poems of the Family edited by Jennifer Strauss, Oxford University Press, 1998
- 50 Years of Queensland Poetry : 1940s to 1990s edited by Philip Neilsen and Helen Horton, Central Queensland University Press, 1998
- Sunlines : An Anthology of Poetry to Celebrate Australia's Harmony in Diversity edited by Anne Fairbairn, Dept of Immigration and Multicultural and Indigenous Affairs, 2002
- Guide to the Perplexed and Other Poems by David Malouf, Picaro Press, 2007
- Revolving Days : Selected Poems by David Malouf, University of Queensland Press, 2008
- 60 Classic Australian Poems edited by Geoff Page, University of NSW Press, 2009
- Macquarie PEN Anthology of Australian Literature edited by Nicholas Jose, Kerryn Goldsworthy, Anita Heiss, David McCooey, Peter Minter, Nicole Moore, and Elizabeth Webby, Allen and Unwin, 2009
- Australian Poetry Since 1788 edited by Geoffrey Lehmann and Robert Gray , University of NSW Press, 2011
- The Turnrow Anthology of Contemporary Australian Poetry edited by John Kinsella, LA Desperation Press Turnrow Books, 2014

== See also ==
- 1969 in Australian literature
- 1969 in poetry

== Notes ==
- You can read the full text of the poem in the Open Library edition of The Year of the Foxes and Other Poems.
