= Five Bells (disambiguation) =

Five Bells is a 1939 poem by Australian poet Kenneth Slessor.

Related to the poem, Five Bells may also refer to:

- Five Bells: XX Poems, a 1939 anthology of poetry by Kenneth Slessor
- Five Bells, a 1963 painting by Australian artist John Olsen
- Salute to Five Bells, a 1973 mural painting also by John Olsen, in the Sydney Opera House concert hall foyer
- Five Bells (novel), by Australian author Gail Jones

Other uses:

- The Bells (band), also known as "The Five Bells".
