= Windy Gap (poem) =

Poem by David Campbell

- by David Campbell
- Country: Australia
- Language: English
- Publisher: The Bulletin, 12 December 1951
- Publication date: 1951
- Lines: 18

"Windy Gap" is a poem by Australian poet David Campbell.

It was first published in The Bulletin on 12 December 1951 and later in several of the author's poetry collections and a number of other Australian poetry anthologies.

== Outline ==
A shepherd, moving his sheep through Windy Gap, is transfixed by a hawk and a magpie who seem to bring the world around him into sharper focus.

== Critical reception ==
In his commentary on the poem in 60 Classic Australian Poems Geoff Page noted "You can almost see the Akubra, the Drizabone and the R. M. Williams boots; you can practically smell the horse sweat though none of these is mentioned. You can feel seventeenth- and nineteenth-century English verse in the background, but you don’t doubt for a minute it's Australian."

== Further publications ==
After its initial publication in The Bulletin in 1951, the poem was reprinted as follows:

- Australia Writes : An Anthology edited by T. Inglis Moore, Cheshire, 1953
- The Penguin Book of Australian Verse edited by John Thompson, Kenneth Slessor and R. G. Howarth, Penguin Books, 1958
- Australian Poets Speak edited by Colin Thiele and Ian Mudie, Rigby, 1961
- Vision Vol 1 No 1, Jun 1963
- Selected Poems 1942-1968 by David Campbell, Angus and Robertson, 1968
- Silence Into Song : An Anthology of Australian Verse edited by Clifford O'Brien, Rigby, 1968
- The Penguin Book of Australian Verse edited by Harry Heseltine, Penguin Books, 1972
- The Land's Meaning edited by L. M. Hannan and B. A. Breen, Macmillan, 1973
- Australian Verse from 1805 : A Continuum edited by Geoffrey Dutton, 1976
- Selected Poems by David Campbell, Angus and Robertson, 1978
- The Golden Apples of the Sun : Twentieth Century Australian Poetry edited by Chris Wallace-Crabbe, Melbourne University Press, 1980
- The Illustrated Treasury of Australian Verse edited by Beatrice Davis, Nelson, 1984
- My Country : Australian Poetry and Short Stories, Two Hundred Years edited by Leonie Kramer, Lansdowne, 1985
- Cross-Country : A Book of Australian Verse edited by John Barnes and Brian MacFarlane, Heinemann, 1988
- Collected Poems by David Campbell, edited by Leonie Kramer, Angus and Robertson, 1989
- Fivefathers : Five Australian Poets of the Pre-Academic Era edited by Les Murray, Carcanet, 1994
- 80 Great Poems from Chaucer to Now edited by Geoff Page, University of NSW Press, 2006
- Hardening of the Light by David Campbell, edited by Philip Mead, Indigo, 2006
- The Penguin Anthology of Australian Poetry edited by John Kinsella, Penguin, 2009
- 60 Classic Australian Poems edited by Geoff Page, University of NSW Press, 2009
- The Puncher & Wattmann Anthology of Australian Poetry edited by John Leonard, Puncher & Wattmann, 2009
- Sense, Shape, Symbol : An Investigation of Australian Poetry edited by Brian Keyte, Phoenix Education, 2013

== See also ==
- 1951 in poetry
- 1951 in literature
- 1951 in Australian literature
- Australian literature
