= Secret Policeman =

1961 poem by Australian poet Vincent Buckley

- by Vincent Buckley
- First published in: Quadrant
- Country: Australia
- Language: English
- Series: Eleven Political Poems
- Publication date: Spring 1961

"Secret Policeman" (1961) is a poem by Australian poet Vincent Buckley.

It was originally published in the literary magazine Quadrant vol. 5 no. 4 Spring 1961, and was subsequently reprinted in the author's single-author collections and a number of Australian poetry anthologies.

This poem is number VIII in a sequence of poems, by the author, called "Eleven Political Poems".

== Synopsis ==
The poem was written after the Hungarian Revolution of 1956, during which photos of secret policemen hanging from lamp posts in Budapest were distributed in newspapers and newsreels around the world. Here the author speculates about the feelings, motivations and background of one such secret policeman.

== Critical reception ==
In his commentary on the poem in 60 Classic Australian Poems Geoff Page noted that the poem is "no mere 'noir' scene from a movie. It's something people in countries around the world are living with right now".

John McLaren, writing in Journey Without Arrival : The Life and Writing of Vincent Buckley, his major critical appraisal of the poet and his works, found the poem to be "convincing because the character has not even an outward semblance of individuality. The policeman, heir of a hangman and the state, is no more than a soul expanded to a uniform."

== Publication history ==
After the poem's initial publication in Quadrant in 1961 it was reprinted as follows:

- Prospect vol. 5 no. 3, 1962
- Australian Letters vol. 7 no. 1 October 1965
- Arcady and Other Places : Poems by Vincent Buckley, Melbourne University Press, 1966
- A Book of Australian Verse edited by Judith Wright, Oxford University Press, 1968
- New Impulses in Australian Poetry edited by Rodney Hall and Thomas Shapcott, University of Queensland Press, 1968
- Twelve Poets, 1950-1970 edited by Alexander Craig, Jacaranda Press, 1971
- The Golden Apples of the Sun : Twentieth Century Australian Poetry edited by Chris Wallace-Crabbe, Melbourne University Press, 1980
- Selected Poems by Vincent Buckley, Angus and Robertson, 1981
- Quadrant Twenty-Five Years edited by Lee Shrubb, Vivian Smith and Peter Coleman, University of Queensland Press, 1982
- The Penguin Anthology of Australian Poetry edited by John Kinsella, Penguin, 2009
- 60 Classic Australian Poems edited by Geoff Page, University of NSW Press, 2009

== Notes ==
- You can read the full text of the poem via the Informit website, or on the archive of the Poetry Library website.

== See also ==
- 1961 in Australian literature
- 1961 in poetry
