= The Amorous Cannibal =

1985 Australian poetry collection by Chris Wallace-Crabbe

- Author: Chris Wallace-Crabbe
- Language: English
- Genre: Poetry collection
- Publisher: Oxford University Press
- Publication date: 1985
- Publication place: United Kingdom
- Media type: Print
- Pages: 60 pp.
- Awards: 1985 Grace Leven Prize for Poetry, joint winner
- ISBN: 0192119680

The Amorous Cannibal is a collection of poems by Australian poet Chris Wallace-Crabbe, published by Oxford University Press in 1985.

The collection contains 67 poems from a variety of sources.

== Contents ==
- "The Amorous Cannibal"
- "Mind"
- "The Figure in the Carpet"
- "Recollection (for Gwen Harwood)"
- "The Landlord of Himself"
- "Forgetting"
- "Abhorring a Vacuum"
- "Smart as Paint, or Less (for Tim Bass)"
- "The Shadow Minister"
- "Nub"
- "Hoffmann Drunk"
- "Exit the Players"
- "Spirit and Act, or the Last Metro"
- "Squibs in the Nick of Time"
- "Redemptive Heights"
- "Panoptics"
- "The Good Spirit Bounces Back"
- "Five Easy Pieces : Artichoke (The Bits and Pieces : Artichoke)"
- "Five Easy Pieces : Banana (The Bits and Pieces : Banana)"
- "The Bits and Pieces : City"
- "The Bits and Pieces : Dodgems"
- "The Bits and Pieces : Emus"
- "The Bits and Pieces : Foot"
- "Five Easy Pieces : Galvo (The Bits and Pieces : Galvo)"
- "The Bits and Pieces : Hair"
- "The Bits and Pieces : Ink"
- "The Bits and Pieces : Jasmine"
- "The Bits and Pieces : Kelp"
- "The Bits and Pieces : Lava"
- "The Bits and Pieces : Emus"
- "The Bits and Pieces : Nectarines"
- "The Bits and Pieces : Opener"
- "The Bits and Pieces : Plantain"
- "The Bits and Pieces : Quail"
- "The Bits and Pieces : Roses"
- "The Bits and Pieces : Skies"
- "The Bits and Pieces : Telephone"
- "Five Easy Pieces : Underwear (The Bits and Pieces : Underwear)"
- "The Bits and Pieces : Veils"
- "The Bits and Pieces : Washing Machine"
- "Five Easy Pieces : Yams (The Bits and Pieces : Yams)"
- "The Bits and Pieces : Zephyr"
- "Puck is Not Sure about Apollo"
- "The Fall of the West"
- "Eating the Future : (I)"
- "Eating the Future : (II)"
- "Words"
- "That Radical Politics is Impossible"
- "Sand in My Shoes"
- "Practitioners of Silence"
- "We'll Build a Stairway to Paradise"
- "The Home Conveyancing Kit"
- "Patient Portent"
- "River"
- "Kia Ora"
- "Shadows"
- "Aunt"
- "Under the Roof of the World"
- "Gaspard de la Nuit"
- "Still"
- "The Mower Against Ocean"
- "Mulga Jack on Swans (for Charles Causley)"
- "Sacred Ridges Above Diamond Creek (for Les Murray and for My Pocket Tape Recorder)"
- "Amphibious"
- "The Fifteen Hundred Year Vigil"
- "The Slaughterhouse (for Katherine and Jim)"
- "A Stone Age Decadent"

== Critical reception ==
In The Age reviewer Jennifer Strauss noted the collection's "straightforwardness of line and grotesquerie". She concluded that "It is not easy to finger a quintessential Wallace-Crabbe poem; one needs the whole collection to begin to sense the subjectivity of this Protean performer."

Writing in Australian Book Review Peter Porter noted that this collection shows Wallace-Crabbe writing "with twice the élan [he] had at the beginning" of his career. He continued: "The Amorous Cannibal is as fizzy a book of poems as you could ask to read. Language manages to play on its own, relying on the shapes of nature encoded in it, and at the same time the proverbial things the poet has to say (which is the main reason for his rounding up his words) lose none of their essential decorum."

== Awards ==
- 1985 Grace Leven Prize for Poetry, joint winner

== See also ==
- 1985 in Australian literature
