= R. A. Simpson =

Australian poet and poetry editor, artist and art lecturer (1929 – 2002)

- Born: Ronald Albert Simpson; 1 February 1929; Melbourne, Victoria
- Died: 2 October 2002 (aged 73)
- Other names: Ron Simpson; Gillian Bianchini
- Occupations: Poet, Editor, Artist and Art teacher
- Known for: Poetry

Ronald Albert Simpson (1 February 1929 – 2 October 2002) was an Australian poet and poetry editor, artist and art lecturer. He was one of the Melbourne poets, and had a long tenure as poetry editor of The Age.

== Life ==
Simpson was born in Melbourne. He studied at the Royal Melbourne Institute of Technology and studied art under George Bell. He taught at schools in England and Australia. In 1968 he was appointed lecturer in art at Melbourne's Chisholm Institute of Technology. He retired in 1987, and died in 2002.

== Writing career ==
Simpson was one of a group of Melbourne poets, including Chris Wallace-Crabbe, Vincent Buckley, Noel Macainsh, and Alexander Craig, who came together in the 1960s and 1970s. Gorton writes that this was "a combative time in Australian poetry" with different "cliques" operating, including the Jindyworobaks, the New Poets and the Melbourne poets. The Melbourne poets were "deliberately prosaic ... finding their poetry in suburbs and ordinary days". Poet Chris Wallace-Crabbe reiterated this in his obituary of Simpson in The Age on 10 October 2002. He wrote that Simpson "was a poet who put the Australian suburbs on the map. Verse had long been under the thumb of the landed gentry and Sydney quasi-bohemians, but he stuck resolutely, quietly, diurnally to the way most of us live". Gorton qualifies this, though, by writing that Simpson's poetry's strength is that it is "at once so commonplace and odd", providing an artist's "skewed perspective on familiar happenings". Gorton suggests too, that his poetry is extroverted rather than inward-looking, that it can be "comic and lugubrious, ponderous and terse", and that he can turn his analysis on himself.

His first book of poetry Walk along the beach was published in 1960, and was followed by another 10 volumes over the next four decades. His last work was published posthumously. He and Chris Wallace-Crabbe both used the pseudonym "Gillian Bianchini".

Simpson was poetry editor of The Bulletin (1963–65), following Vincent Buckley, and of The Age (1969–97). He received the Christopher Brennan Award from the Fellowship of Australian Writers in 1992.

== Art career ==
Simpson was an artist as well as a poet, and often illustrated his poetry drafts. His published poetry collection, The Midday Clock (1999), includes his own pen and ink drawings, the role of which he told the publisher was to help illustrate the message of his poetry.

== Bibliography ==
=== Poetry ===
Collections

- The Walk Along the Beach (1960, Edwards and Shaw)
- The Real Pompeii (1964, Jacaranda Press, reprinted by Picaro Press in 2010)
- After the Assassination and Other Poems (1968, Jacaranda Press)
- Diver (1972, University of Queensland Press)
- Words for a Journey : Poems 1970-1985 (1986, Melbourne University Press)
- Dancing Table : Poems and Drawings 1986-1991 (1992, Penguin Books)
- The Midday Clock (1999, Macmillan)
- Sky's Beach (2004, Five Islands Press)

Selected list of poems

Title	Year	First published	Reprinted/collected
Estranged at midnight	1965	Simpson, R. A. (March 1965). "Estranged at midnight". Meanjin Quarterly. 24 (1): 112.	
