= Charles Buckmaster =

Australian poet

Charles Buckmaster (1951–1972) was an Australian poet. He was involved in the publication of The Great Auk.

During his lifetime, he published two volumes of poetry, both reprinted after his death by the University of Queensland Press collection. While his output was not prolific, his poems have been included in many poetry anthologies. His early death placed him with Michael Dransfield, another short-lived poet of the era.

Australian poet Robbie Coburn's 2019 collection The Other Flesh (UWA Publishing) was dedicated to Buckmaster.
