= John McKellar Stewart =

Australian philosopher (1878–1953)

John McKellar Stewart CMG (4 May 1878 – 25 April 1953), also known as J. McKellar Stewart, was an Australian philosopher who was professor of philosophy at the University of Adelaide and its vice-chancellor from 1945 to 1948.

== Biography ==
Stewart was born on 4 May 1878, in Scotland, to Alexander Stewart (died February 1920) and his wife Lillias Stewart (née McKellar). They moved to Australia in 1852 and operated a farm at Ballangeich, Victoria, around 30 km north of Warrnambool.

Lillias McKellar left Scotland for Australia aboard Christina in company with one John McKellar, arriving in Sydney in April 1839.

Stewart was employed as trainee teacher at Warrnambool State School, then taught at Charlton then Benalla. He entered Ormond College, University of Melbourne, where he graduated in philosophy in 1906 with first class honours, winning the Hastie Scholarship in Logic and Philosophy, and from 1907 to 1909, was employed delivering lectures in Logic and Philosophy to Ormond College students, meanwhile studying theology and was ordained a minister of the Presbyterian Church. In 1909, he married Margaret Grace Stuart Bothroyd MA.

In 1911, he completed his D.Phil. at the University of Edinburgh, his thesis being on the work of Henri Bergson, later published as Critical Exposition of Bergson's Philosophy, to some acclaim. He undertook further studies at the University of Marburg.

He returned to the University of Melbourne in 1912 as a lecturer in philosophy, and entered wholeheartedly into the intellectual and social life of the university. He was heavily involved with the University Union, the controversial Public Questions Society, and the Student Christian Movement and served as chairman of each. He took part in University Extension activities, and for several years served as its secretary. in 1920 Stewart was appointed associate professor of philosophy, a post created for him, then in 1922 was offered the Hughes Professorship in Philosophy on the recommendation of Professor Mitchell, the outgoing incumbent, and was appointed the following year.

He was appointed deputy vice-chancellor in 1943 and vice-chancellor in 1945, maintaining his academic duties, the last person to combine the two roles. He retired as vice-chancellor in 1948, but remained professor of philosophy until his retirement in 1950, and was made professor emeritus by the University Council. Other positions he held at Adelaide University at various times included chairman of the University Public Examinations Board and chairman of the university joint committee for tutorial classes. He was foundation chairman of the Students' Union (1926).

== Other activities ==
- Stewart was member of the State Advisory Council for Education.
- He was appointed to the Government Commission which enquired into education in SA in 1933.
- He was chairman of the Scotch College Council of Governors from 1926 to the day he died.
- He was president of the Kindergarten Union of SA from 1924 to the year he died. He was succeeded by Sir Herbert Mayo.
- He was a keen gardener, taking pleasure from raising native plants from seeds he collected on the South Australian mainland and on Kangaroo Island.

== Family ==
Stewart married Margaret Grace "Madge" Bothroyd (died 13 August 1948) on 3 November 1909. Margaret was a founder of the Blackwood branch of the Women's Non-Party Association, which merged into the South Australian League of Women Voters.

- eldest son John S. M. Stewart MB BS married Joyce Spencer Job (1920–?) on 14 November 1942. Joyce was daughter of (Spencer) Roy Job.
- A. K. McKellar Stewart MB BS (23 January 1920–?) lived in Casino, New South Wales
- Neil McKellar Stewart (20 July 1924–?) lived in Blackwood
- Margaret McKellar Stewart MA (died 2007) married Maurice Meredith Stericker Finnis MA (died 1995) on 11 August 1939. Margaret, educated at Walford School and Adelaide University, was president, League of Women Voters. Maurice was the only son of Rev. Horace Percy Finnis (died 1960), organist at St Peter's Cathedral 1936–1955. Their children were

- John Finnis (born 28 July 1941) Rhodes Scholar to Oxford University and noted Legal academic.
- Jane Finnis (born 4 August 1942) married Robert Childs; they are best known as founders of SCALA
- Catherine Finnis (born 14 November 1944) studied music at the Elder Conservatorium; noted 'cellist.
- (Alexander) Nigel Finnis (born 2 October 1950) studied Modern European languages at Flinders University then Cambridge, gaining PhD in Linguistics.

They had a home, "Dalkeith", in Blackwood.

== Recognition ==
- He was appointed C.M.G. in 1949.
- The McKellar Stewart Kindergarten in Kensington, South Australia was named in his honor.
