= Five Bells =

Meditative poem by Kenneth Slessor

- by Kenneth Slessor
- Written: 1935–37
- First published in: Five Bells : XX Poems
- Country: Australia
- Language: English
- Publication date: 1939

"Five Bells" (1939) is a meditative poem by Australian poet Kenneth Slessor. It was originally published as the title poem in the author's collection Five Bells : XX Poems, and later appeared in numerous poetry anthologies. A 2017 study of Australian national poetry anthologies ranked "Five Bells" as the most anthologised poem, appearing in all except one anthology published between 1946 and 2011.

== Outline ==
The poem is a meditative piece based on a ship's bell ringing five bells - which occurs at either 2:30, 6:30, 10:30, 14:30, 18:30 or 22:30. The poem is a reflection of the death of Slessor's friend Joe Lynch who drowned in Sydney Harbour on 14 May 1927. Slessor wrote the poem between August 1935 and January 1937.

== Critical reception ==
In her essay "'Living Backward' : Slessor and Masculine Elegy" (1997) Kate Lilley noted: "Chronologically displaced, “Five Bells” is repositioned and reread as the generically appropriate marker of the premature end of Slessor's career, and also as the aesthetically satisfying rhetorical proof of his poetic achievement. But the discursive meaning and affect [sic] generated by, and attributed to, Slessor's elegy exceed the boundaries of even the most expansive consideration of Slessor as poet, while also being disconnected from an analysis of genre."

The Oxford Companion to Australian Literature stated: "Although the emphasis is on the impermanence of all human relationships and thus the triumph of time (moved by 'little fidget wheels') over life, the affection exposed for the scruffy, unruly, unimportant Irishman gives the poem a tender and human character."

In his book Reading Australian Poetry Andrew Taylor commented "It is a powerfully moving poem, in which the sharp note of anguish is unmistakeably audible. But the poem's significance depends as much on how it came to be said as on any emotions that may be generated by it."

== Impact and legacy ==
Inspired by the poem the Australian artist John Olsen completed his painting Five Bells on commission in 1963. It was acquired by the Art Gallery of New South Wales in 1999. The artist also painted Salute to Five Bells as a mural for the rear foyer area of the Sydney Opera House concert hall in 1973.

The Australian author Gail Jones wrote a novel titled Five Bells in 2011, and noted in her acknowledgments: "The first debt of this project is to Kenneth Slessor's elegiac poem, Five Bells (1939), which returned to me, like a remembered song, one midnight on a ferry in the centre of Circular Quay".

The text of the poem is reproduced on a banister in Kenneth Slessor Park in the Sydney suburb of Chatswood.

== Further publications ==
- One Hundred Poems : 1919–1939 by Kenneth Slessor (1944)
- An Anthology of Australian Verse edited by George Mackaness (1952)
- A Book of Australian Verse edited by Judith Wright (1956)
- Modern Australian Verse edited by Douglas Stewart, Angus and Robertson, 1964
- The Penguin Book of Australian Verse edited by Harry Payne Heseltine (1972)
- Poems by Kenneth Slessor (1975)
- The Golden Apples of the Sun : Twentieth Century Australian Poetry edited by Chris Wallace-Crabbe, Melbourne University Press, 1980
- My Country : Australian Poetry and Short Stories, Two Hundred Years edited by Leonie Kramer (1985)
- The New Oxford Book of Australian Verse edited by Les Murray (1986)
- The Penguin Book of Modern Australian Poetry edited by John Tranter and Philip Mead (1991)
- The Faber Book of Modern Australian Verse edited by Vincent Buckley (1991)
- Australian Poetry in the Twentieth Century edited by Robert Gray and Geoffrey Lehmann, Heinemann, 1991
- Kenneth Slessor : Collected Poems Kenneth Slessor edited by Dennis Haskell and Geoffrey Dutton (1994)
- Seven Centuries of Poetry in English edited by John Leonard (2003)
- Two Centuries of Australian Poetry edited by Kathrine Bell (2007)
- The Penguin Anthology of Australian Poetry edited by John Kinsella (2009)
- Harbour City Poems : Sydney in Verse, 1788–2008 edited by Martin Langford (2009)
- Macquarie PEN Anthology of Australian Literature edited by Nicholas Jose, Kerryn Goldsworthy, Anita Heiss, David McCooey, Peter Minter, Nicole Moore, Elizabeth Webby (2009)
- The Puncher & Wattmann Anthology of Australian Poetry edited by John Leonard (2009)
- 100 Australian Poems of Love and Loss edited by Jamie Grant (2011)
- Australian Poetry Since 1788 edited by Geoffrey Lehmann, Robert Gray (2011)

== See also ==
- 1939 in poetry
- 1939 in Australian literature

== Notes ==
- You can read the full text of the poem on the Poem Hunter website
- The Conversation website featured an in-depth analysis of the poem as part of their Australian Poetry Classics series of articles.
