= Homecoming (poem) =

1968 poem by Bruce Dawe

- by Bruce Dawe
- Original title: "Home-Coming"
- First published in: The Age
- Country: Australia
- Language: English
- Publication date: 6 July 1968
- Lines: 25

"Homecoming" is a 1968 poem by Bruce Dawe. It was originally published in The Age newspaper on 6 July 1968, and subsequently reprinted in the author's poetry collections and other poetry anthologies.

Written as an elegy for anonymous soldiers, "Homecoming" is an anti-war poem protesting Australia's involvement in the Vietnam War during the 1960s. Dennis Haskell, Winthrop Professor of English and Cultural Studies at University of Western Australia, has called it "the most highly regarded poem about Vietnam written by any Australian", and Peter Pierce, the editor of The Cambridge History of Australian Literature has described it as "one of the finest threnodies in the war literature of Vietnam".

The anti-war sentiment in "Homecoming" is more direct than in Dawe's other well-known war poem, "Weapons Training", written two years later. The ironic use of the word homecoming, with its usual connotations of celebration, as the title becomes apparent on reading the poem, in which the acts of collecting and processing the bodies of the war dead and shipping them home are described in a highly repetitive fashion, with a rhythm that evokes the beat of a funeral drum. Although the poem was written in 1968, the year Dawe left the Royal Australian Air Force, it had its origins, according to Dawe's biographer Peter Kuch, in Dawe's earlier "political awakening in Melbourne in the mid-1950s" and in particular his personal reaction to the fall of Dien Bien Phu in 1954. Before joining the RAAF, Dawe had worked as a postman. John Kinsella has proposed that Dawe's experiences during that time are echoed in the final lines of "Homecoming":

telegrams tremble like leaves from a wintery tree
and the spider grief swings in his bitter geometry
—they're bringing them home, now, too late, too early

— Bruce Dawe, "Homecoming", quoted in Kinsella (2008) p. 322

"Homecoming" is included in the 1971 collection of Dawe's poetry Condolences of the Season and in his Sometimes Gladness: Collected Poems, 1954–1992. It also appears in several anthologies of Australian literature, including Two Centuries of Australian Poetry (Oxford University Press, 1988) and The Macmillan Anthology of Australian Literature (Macmillan, 1990).

== Sources ==
- Astley, Thea (1979). Three Australian Writers: Essays on Bruce Dawe, Barbara Baynton, and Patrick White. Townsville Foundation for Australian Literary Studies
- Haskell, Dennis (2002). Attuned to Alien Moonlight: The Poetry of Bruce Dawe, Univ. of Queensland Press. ISBN 0702232386
- Kinsella, John (2008). Contrary Rhetoric: Lectures on Landscape and Language. Fremantle Press. ISBN 1921361050
- Kuch, Peter (1995). Bruce Dawe Oxford University Press. ISBN 0195534808
- Pierce, Peter (2002). "Australian and American literature of the Vietnam War" in Australia's Vietnam War, pp. 110–135. Texas A&M University Press. ISBN 1585441376
- Wheeler, David (2011). "Two Australian poems: 'Trains' by Judith Wright and 'Homecoming' by Bruce Dawe'" in The Imperial Nightmare: Studies in English Literature, pp. 123–124. GRIN Verlag. ISBN 3640978366
