= Evan Jones (Australian poet) =

Australian poet and academic (1931–2022)

- Born: 20 November 1931; Melbourne, Victoria, Australia
- Died: 3 August 2022 (aged 89)
- Education: Melbourne High School; University of Melbourne; Stanford University
- Occupations: Poet; academic

Evan Lloyd Jones (20 November 1931 – 3 August 2022) was an Australian poet and academic.

== Early life ==
Born in Melbourne, 20 November 1931, Jones attended Melbourne High School, and studied at the University of Melbourne, and Stanford University (1958–1960) .

== Career ==
After 1960, he taught English at the University of Melbourne.

== Works ==
- Inside the Whale: poems, Melbourne: Cheshire, 1960
- Understandings: poems, Cambridge University Press, 1967
- Kenneth MacKenzie, by Evan Jones, 'Australian writers and their work' series, Oxford University Press, 1969
- The Poems of Kenneth Mackenzie, edited by Evan Jones and Geoffrey Little, Angus and Robertson, Sydney, 1972
- Recognitions, Australian National University Press, 1978
- Left at the Post, University of Queensland Press, 1984
- The politic body and other poems, Picaro Press, 2009
- Alone At Last!, Picaro Press, 2009
- Heavens Above, Picaro Press, 2011
- Selected Poems, Grand Parade Poets, 2014
