= Francis Webb (poet) =

Twentieth century Australian poet

- Born: Francis Charles Webb-Wagg; 8 February 1925; Rose Park, Adelaide, South Australia
- Died: 23 November 1973; Rydalmere, Sydney
- Occupation: Poet

Francis Charles Webb-Wagg (8 February 1925 – 23 November 1973) was an Australian poet who published under the name Francis Webb. Diagnosed as suffering from schizophrenia in the 1950s, he spent most of his adult life in and out of psychiatric hospitals. His output was prolific and his work has often been published in anthologies.

== Early life ==
Francis Webb was born in Adelaide. His father was a musician, Director of the North Sydney Academy of Music before moving to Adelaide where he became the owner of a piano importing business in Grenfell Street. His mother was a socialite with a keen interest in horse racing. She died when he was two years old, and his father was hospitalised a year later. In 1928, Webb and his three sisters (Mavis, Claudia, and Leonie) were sent to live with their paternal grandparents, Charles and Amy Webb-Wagg, in Sydney.

Webb wrote his first poems as a birthday present for his paternal grandmother when he was seven years old, under the tutelage of an aunt who died before she could see them in print. When Webb was 14 years old his much loved grandfather died. Webb's first major individual publication came with the appearance of 'Palace of Dreams' in The Bulletin (10 June 1942).

Having finished high school at St Pius X College, Sydney, Webb considered entry into Sydney University on a scholarship, but this plan was disrupted by the Second World War. He enlisted in the Royal Australian Air Force between 1943 and 1945 and spent time during the war based in Canada. His father died at Sydney's Callan Park Hospital a few weeks after his demobilisation.

== Career ==
Webb enrolled at Sydney University in early 1946 but discontinued studies by mid-1946. His desire to write and travel saw his return to Canada in 1947, where he worked for the publisher Macmillan. In 1948, Angus & Robertson published his first collection of poems, A Drum for Ben Boyd, with illustrations by Norman Lindsay.

In 1949, after a period of employment, and the termination of his engagement to a Jewish girl named Ethel (whom he had met in Canada during the war), he set off for Britain. During this time, Webb's correspondence with Norman Lindsay faltered and he rejected illustrations proposed by Lindsay for his second collection, Leichhardt in Theatre, which was eventually published by Angus & Robertson in 1952 (minus illustrations). Webb's break from Lindsay marked his rejection of Lindsay's renowned anti-Semitism. Angus & Robertson did not publish his work again until he had regained the full support of Douglas Stewart (editor of The Bulletin and Lindsay's friend) a few years later.

Soon after Webb's 1949 arrival in England, he was confined to a mental asylum following a suicide attempt. His younger sister Leonie flew to England and retrieved her brother in 1950, stopping off at Rome on the trip home. Once back in Australia, he endured a period of itinerancy combined with ecstatic episodes of writing in Galston, New South Wales; Melbourne; Semaphore, South Australia; and Jamestown, South Australia until 1953. The creative product of these years, including his famous poems 'Birthday' (about Adolf Hitler's last hours) and 'The Canticle' (a poem about the life of Francis of Assisi), was self-published in his third collection simply entitled Birthday (1953).

In late 1953 Webb returned to England. On his trip to England he made a stopover in India, the inspiration for such poems as 'Song of Hunger' and 'Back Street in Calcutta'. But once in England he was confined at a number of asylums over a period of seven years. During this time he wrote many of the poems, including 'Eyre All Alone', which would comprise his fourth collection Socrates and other poems, eventually published in 1961.

Following a Commonwealth Literary Fund Fellowship, in 1958, and with the support of Douglas Stewart and other concerned Australian poets such as Rosemary Dobson, David Campbell and Vincent Buckley), his supervised release from David Rice Hospital (Norwich) was organised. His passport was returned to him and he came home to Australia in late 1960. His paternal grandmother died shortly after his return.

Webb spent the rest of his life in and out of New South Wales and Victorian psychiatric facilities. In 1964, Angus & Robertson published his fifth collection The Ghost of the Cock, then in 1969 released his well-known Collected Poems, with an unforgettable foreword by Sir Herbert Read (the eminent leading British critic in his day) that compared Webb's work on equal footing with that of major European and American poets Pasternak, Lowell, Rilke and Eliot. After the publication of The Ghost of the Cock in 1964, Webb wrote eight substantial poems (two of which appear in Collected Poems while the rest can be found in the recent selection of his work in the online Australian literary journal Thylazine). In 1967, Webb was praised by Read as "one of the greatest poets of our time . . . one of the most unjustly neglected poets of the century," and Webb has since attracted substantial critical acclaim for his profound vision, his unique spiritual quest to discover the heart of things.

Webb died on 23 November 1973 in Sydney's Rydalmere Psychiatric Hospital of a coronary occlusion. He is buried at Macquarie Park Cemetery in northern Sydney, with 'Sunset Hails a Rising' from his poem 'The Stations' upon his headstone.

In 2011, University of Western Australia Publishing released the most inclusive and error-free edition of Webb's Collected Poems to date, edited with notes by Toby Davidson from Macquarie University.

== Awards ==
- 1973 – Australian Literature Society Gold Medal, winner
- Christopher Brennan Award, awarded posthumously

== Works by Francis Webb ==
=== Collections ===
- A Drum for Ben Boyd (1948)
- Leichhardt in Theatre (1952)
- Birthday (1953)
- Socrates and other Poems (1961)
- Ghost of the Cock (1964)
- Collected Poems (1969; 1977)
- Poets on Record (Australian Poets Read from their Own Work) (1975)
- The Poetry of Francis Webb (1991)
- Collected Poems (edited by Toby Davidson) (2011)

=== Selected list of poems ===
Title	Year	First published	Reprinted/collected in
"Five Days Old"	1958	The Bulletin, 30 April 1958	Socrates and Other Poems by Francis Webb, Angus and Robertson, 1961, pp. 33–34
"Harry"	1962	Meanjin Quarterly vol. 21 no. 1, March 1962	The Ghost of the Cock : Poems by Francis Webb, Angus and Robertson, 1964, pp. 46–47

== Other resources ==
- Patricia Excel "'Before Two Girls': A Lost Poem by Francis Webb" in Southerly Vol. 53, No. 3, 1993.
- Michael Griffith God's Fool: The Life and Poetry of Francis Webb Sydney: Angus & Robertson, 1991.
- Richard Hillman Cultural Metamorphosis: Lacan, Zizek and the Poetry of Francis Webb doctoral thesis, Flinders University of South Australia, 2004
- Graeme Kinross-Smith "The Gull in a Green Storm – A Profile of Francis Webb (1925–1973)" in Westerly Vol. 26, No. 2, 1981.
- Andrew Lynch "Remaking the Middle Ages in Australia: Francis Webb's 'The Canticle' (1953)" in Australian Literary Studies Vol. 19, No. 1, 1999.
- Peter Meere & Leonie Meere Francis Webb: Poet and Brother Pomona, Queensland: Sage Old Books, 2001.
- Francis Webb 'Palace of Dreams' in The Bulletin 1942.
