= John Manifold =

Australian poet (1915–1985)

John Streeter Manifold
- Born: 21 April 1915; Melbourne
- Died: 19 April 1985 (aged 69); Brisbane, Queensland, Australia
- Education: Geelong Grammar School, Jesus College, Cambridge
- Occupations: Publisher, poet, intelligence officer
- Political party: Communist Party of Great Britain (CPGB)
- Honours: Member of the Order of Australia (AM) - 1984 Australia Day Honours

John Streeter Manifold AM (21 April 1915 – 19 April 1985) was an Australian poet and critic. He was born in Melbourne, into a well known Camperdown family. He was educated at Geelong Grammar School, and read modern languages at Jesus College, Cambridge. While in Cambridge he joined the Communist Party of Great Britain. He was involved in an attempt to create a successor (Poetry and the People) to Left Review, when the latter folded in 1938.

He then worked in Germany, in publishing. During World War II, he served in intelligence in the British Army, in the Middle East, Africa and France. He was a published war poet; Trident, with Hubert Nicholson and David Martin, was published by Randall Swingler's Fore Publications in 1944.

In 1949, he returned to Australia, settling in Brisbane. He was a founder in 1950 of the Realist Writers Group. He then worked and published mostly on Australian songs and music, reciting ballads at arts festivals. In the 1984 Australia Day Honours, he was made a Member of the Order of Australia (AM) for "service to literature as a poet and musician". He died in Brisbane.

== Bibliography ==
=== Poetry collections ===
- Verses 1930-1933 (1933)
- The Death of Ned Kelly and Other Ballads (1941)
- Trident (1944)
- Selected Verse (1946)
- Nightmares and Sunhorses (1961) poems
- Poems (1967)
- Op 8 : poems 1961-69 (1971)
- Six Sonnets on Human Ecology (1974)
- Sonnets and Sundries (1977)
- Collected Verse (1971)
- On My Selection (1983)

=== Compiler ===
- Bandicoot Ballads (1955)
- The Penguin Australian Song Book (1964)

=== Non-fiction ===
- The Amorous Flute : An unprofessional handbook for recorder players and all amateurs of music (1948)
- The Violin, the Banjo and the Bones: An Essay on the Instruments of Bush Music (1957)
- Who Wrote the Ballads?: Notes on Australian Folksong (1964)
- The Changing Face of Realism (1971)

=== Selected individual poems ===
Title	Year	First published	Reprinted/collected in
"The Tomb of Lt. John Learmonth, AIF"	1945	New Republic, 10 September 1945	Collected Verse, University of Queensland Press, pp. 73–75
"On the Boundary"	1959	Overland, Autumn 1959	Nightmares and Sunhorses, Overland Press, 1961, p. 13
