= Michael Dransfield =

Australian poet

Michael Dransfield ca. 1972, pictured on the cover of Drug Poems

Michael Dransfield (12 September 1948 – 20 April 1973) was an Australian poet active in the 1960s and early 1970s who wrote close to 1,000 poems. He has been described as "one of the most widely read poets of his generation."

== Early life ==
Dransfield was born in Sydney, and educated at Sydney Grammar School. He briefly studied English literature and language at the University of New South Wales and the University of Sydney before dropping out. He worked for some months as a clerk at the Australian Taxation Office before drifting into the counter-culture. From then on he worked intermittently, living mainly in Paddington, Balmain, and Darlinghurst in Sydney, and in the north coast town of Casino, and he travelled frequently between Tasmania and Queensland, visiting his large group of friends and fellow poets.

== Poetry ==
Dransfield wrote his first poem at the age of eight and began to write regularly at fourteen. He was a prolific poet, writing lyrical poems, which as his career progressed came to focus more and more on drug experiences. His poetry was first published in the mid-1960s.

Dransfield's poems were published in Meanjin, Southerly, Poetry Australia and Poetry magazine. His first published collection was Streets of the Long Voyage. He published two more books, including Drug poems (Sun Books, 1972).

Between 1967 and 1969, Dransfield corresponded and exchanged poems with Peter Kocan, who had been imprisoned for attempting to assassinate federal opposition leader Arthur Calwell, and who was then a patient at the Morisset Mental Hospital in Morisset, New South Wales. The letters comprise drafts of poems by Dransfield, quotes of poems by other poets, and recommendations for books Kocan should read.

=== Themes ===
Dransfield's poems address "people marginalised by society" "the relationship of the creative self to the outside world" "personal identity, the family, the relationship between human beings and the natural world, poetry itself, and states of mind"

== Death ==
In his early twenties, Dransfield was plagued by ill health. He died at the Mater Misericordiae Hospital, North Sydney, on 20 April 1973, aged 24, leaving behind close to a thousand poems. Sources report conflicting causes of death, including that he died of a heroin overdose, infection related to drug use and a report that the coroner's finding on the cause of death was "acute broncho-pneumonia and brain damage".

== Legacy ==
Rodney Hall, who as poetry editor of The Australian newspaper had been among the first to publish Dransfield's poetry, edited and posthumously published several collections of Dransfield's poetry during the late 1970s and early 1980s, including Collected Poems (UQP, 1987). In 2011 a poet character called "Michael" (evidently based on Dransfield) was featured in the second part of the ABC telemovie Paper Giants: The Birth of Cleo.

Several of Dransfield's poems were set to music by Paul Stanhope for mixed choir as Three Geography Songs in 1997. Other composers who have set his texts include Ross Edwards, Simon Reade, Paul-Antoni Bonetti, and Dan Walker.

== Bibliography ==
- Streets of the Long Voyage (University of Queensland Press, 1970)
- The Inspector of Tides (University of Queensland Press, 1972)
- Drug Poems (Sun Books, 1972)
- Memoirs of a Velvet Urinal (Maximus Books, 1975)
- Voyage into Solitude (University of Queensland Press, 1978), ed. Rodney Hall
- The Second Month of Spring (University of Queensland Press, 1980), ed. Rodney Hall
- Michael Dransfield: Collected Poems (University of Queensland Press, 1987), ed. Rodney Hall
- Michael Dransfield: a Retrospective (University of Queensland Press, 2002) selected by John Kinsella
