= Jennifer Strauss =

Australian poet and academic

Jennifer Strauss AM
- Born: 30 January 1933 (age 93); Heywood, Victoria, Australia
- Occupations: Poet and academic
- Writing career
- Notable awards: 2006 FAW Christopher Brennan Award

Jennifer Strauss AM (born 30 January 1933) is one of Australia's pre-eminent contemporary Australian poets, an academic, and pioneer of women's rights. Working in academia she has published several books of criticism and literary autobiography as well as editing anthologies and several volumes of her own poetry. Strauss is a recipient of the Christopher Brennan Award amongst others.

== Early life and education ==
Jennifer Strauss, née Wallace, graduated with honours in English from the University of Melbourne in 1954 where her poetry was published by the Melbourne University Magazine. She then travelled to Scotland where she undertook postgraduate studies at the University of Glasgow. Returning to Melbourne, she was awarded a PhD from Monash University for her thesis, "Boundary conditions : the poetry of Gwen Harwood" in 1991.

== Career ==
Following her graduation, Strauss taught at the universities of New England and Melbourne before taking up the role of Associate Professor in the English Department of Monash University in 1964. She remained at Monash until her retirement in 1998. At that time she was made an Honorary Senior Research Fellow at the university.

Throughout her academic life, Strauss consistently demonstrated commitment to social issues through office-bearing roles in professional and union bodies and reflected these themes in her poetry. Strauss is a former president of the Australian Federation of University Women, later the Australian Federation of Graduate Women. She became a Member Emerita in 2011. She leaves an enduring legacy via the "Jennifer Strauss Fellowship for PhD students."

As well as in Scotland and England, Strauss also lived for various periods in the United States, Canada and Germany. She has also been involved in a series for Video Classroom (1984-1993), discussing with Alan Dilnot (q.v.) various novels such as Potok's The Chosen and Austen's Emma, and the forms of poetry.

The author of a number of critical works, in particular on the poetry of Judith Wright and Gwen Harwood, and the editor of The Collected Verse of Mary Gilmore (2004–2007), Strauss's own poetry has been published in many journals and in several collections, and her work has been widely anthologised. She has written a number of poems that 'are already anthology classics and are likely to remain so' (Geoff Page, 1995).

Recurrent themes in Strauss's writing are memories of a country childhood; motherhood and domestic issues; depression and suicide (especially among females); anti-war concerns; and the re-interpretation of old stories and myths.

== Awards and honours ==
In 2007, Strauss was appointed a Member of the Order of Australia, for her work in education, her work as an academic in the fields of literature and poetry and for her work in woman's issues and industrial relations.

== Works ==
=== Poetry ===
- Children and Other Strangers: Poems. (1975)
- Winter Driving: Poems. (1981)
- Labour Ward. (Pariah, 1988)
- Tierra del Fuego: New and selected poems. (Pariah, 1997)

=== Non-fiction ===
- Stop laughing! I'm Being Serious: Three studies in seriousness and wit in contemporary Australian poetry. (1990)
- Boundary Conditions: The Poetry of Gwen Harwood. (UQP, 1992) ISBN 0-7022-2412-X
- Judith Wright. (OUP, 1995)

=== Edited ===
- The Oxford Book of Australian Love Poems. (OUP, 1993) ISBN 0195536509
- Family Ties: Australian Poems of the Family. (OUP, 1998) ISBN 0195537890
- The Oxford Literary History of Australia. With Bruce Bennett (OUP, 1999) ISBN 978-0-19-553737-6
- The Collected Verse of Mary Gilmore: Volume 1, 1887–1929. (Australian Academy of the Humanities/UQP, 2005) review
- The Collected Verse of Mary Gilmore: Volume 2, 1930–1962. (Australian Academy of the Humanities/UQP, 2006) review
