= Vincent Buckley =

Australian poet and editor

Vincent Thomas Buckley
- Born: 8 July 1925; Romsey, Victoria
- Died: 12 November 1988 (aged 63); Melbourne
- Education: St Catharine's College, Cambridge; University of Melbourne
- Occupations: Poet, Editor

Vincent Thomas Buckley (8 July 1925 – 12 November 1988) was an Australian poet, teacher, editor, essayist and critic.

== Early life ==
Buckley was born in 1925 in Romsey, Victoria to Patrick Buckley, a carter and sometime farm labourer, and his wife Frances Margaret Buckley, née Condonto. He attended St Patrick’s College in East Melbourne, living in a dormitory.

== Career ==
In 1942, Buckley worked for eight months as a clerk in the Commonwealth Department of Supply and Shipping. On 13 December 1943, Buckley enlisted in the Royal Australian Air Force, where he served as a recorder. On 5 February 1945, after spending several months in a military hospital in Sydney, he was discharged due to a disability.

In 1946, Buckley entered University of Melbourne and on 12 July 1947, he married Edna Jean Forbes. The couple had two daughters and later divorced. In 1950, Buckley received a bachelor's degree from the university and in 1951 started teaching English there. In 1954, Buckley was awarded a master's degree from the university. That same year, he published his first poetry collection, The World’s Flesh.

In 1955, Buckley received a two-year scholarship to St. Catharine's College, Cambridge, in the United Kingdom to study the moral criticism of Matthew Arnold, F. R. Leavis and T. S. Eliot. During this period, he was able to take side trips to Ireland.

In 1957, Buckley returned to the University of Melbourne and published his collection, Poetry: Mainly Australian. In 1958, he was named the Lockie Fellow at the university. He edited the magazine, Prospect, from 1958 to 1964, and was the poetry editor of the Bulletin from 1961 until 1963. In 1966, Buckley published the collection Arcady and Other Places and in 1967 held a personal Chair in Poetry at the university.

Between 1967 and 1979, Buckley lived for periods in Ireland, where he founded the Committee for Civil Rights. In 1972, the University of Melbourne awarded him the Dublin prize. On 18 September 1976, in Middle Brighton, Buckley married Penelope Jane Curtis, a 33-year-old research student In 1982, Buckley was awarded the Christopher Brennan Award. In 1987, due to bad health, Buckley retired from the university.

== Later life ==
On 12 November 1988, Buckley died of a heart attack in Kew, Victoria . He was buried in Melton Cemetery in Melton, Victoria.

== Recognition ==
In 1992, the University of Melbourne established The Vincent Buckley Poetry Prize. Each year, it allows an Irish poet to visit Australia and an Australian poet to visit Ireland.

== Oral history ==
Buckley was interviewed multiple times throughout his life. He was first interviewed in 1969 about his life and career, and also reads a few of his poems. In 1974, he was recorded reading his poems. He was then interviewed a final time in 1979 by Jim Davidson. These recordings can be found at the National Library of Australia.

== Themes and subject matter ==
Buckley's subject matter ranged from the personal to the political, with a particular interest in Irish politics, culture and history. Buckley was also heavily involved in Catholic intellectual debate during the period of the Cold War and the emergence in Australia of the Democratic Labour Party.

Buckley's critical writing includes volumes on poetry, the novelist Henry Handel Richardson, and Leonard French's Campion paintings.

== Bibliography ==
- The World’s Flesh (F. W. Cheshire, 1954)
- Essays in Poetry: Mainly Australian (Melbourne University Press, 1957)
- (ed.) Australian Poetry 1958 (Angus & Robertson, 1958)
- Poetry and Morality: Studies on the Criticism of Matthew Arnold, T. S. Eliot, and F. R. Leavis (Chatto & Windus, 1959)
- Henry Handel Richardson (Oxford University Press, 1961)
- Masters in Israel:Poems (Angus and Robertson, 1961)
- (ed.) Eight by Eight: Poems (Jacaranda Press, 1963)
- Arcady and Other Places (Melbourne University Press and Cambridge University Press, 1966)
- Poetry and the Sacred (Chatto & Windus, 1968)
- Golden Builders: and Other Poems (Angus & Robertson, 1976)
- Maundy Sunlight (Open Door Press, 1975)
- Late Winter Child (Dolmen Press, 1979)
- The Pattern (Dolmen Press, 1979)
- Selected Poems (Angus & Robertson, 1981)
- Buckley, Vincent (1983). Cutting green hay : friendships, movements and cultural conflicts in Australia's great decades. Ringwood, Vic.: Penguin Books.
- Memory Ireland: Insights into the Contemporary Irish Condition (Penguin Books, 1985)
- Last Poems (McPhee Gribble and Penguin Books, 1991)
- (ed.) The Faber Book of Modern Australian Verse (Faber and Faber, 1991)
- Vincent Buckley: Collected Poems (John Leonard Press, 2009)

=== Selected list of poems ===
Title	Year	First published	Reprinted/collected in
"Secret Policeman"	1961	Quadrant vol. 5 no. 4 Spring 1961	Arcady and Other Places : Poems by Vincent Buckley, Melbourne University Press, 1966, p. 53
"Stroke"	1965	Quadrant vol. 9 no. 1 January–February 1965	Arcady and Other Places : Poems by Vincent Buckley, Melbourne University Press, 1966
