= Chris Wallace-Crabbe =

Australian poet and academic (1934–2025)

Chris Wallace-Crabbe AM FAHA
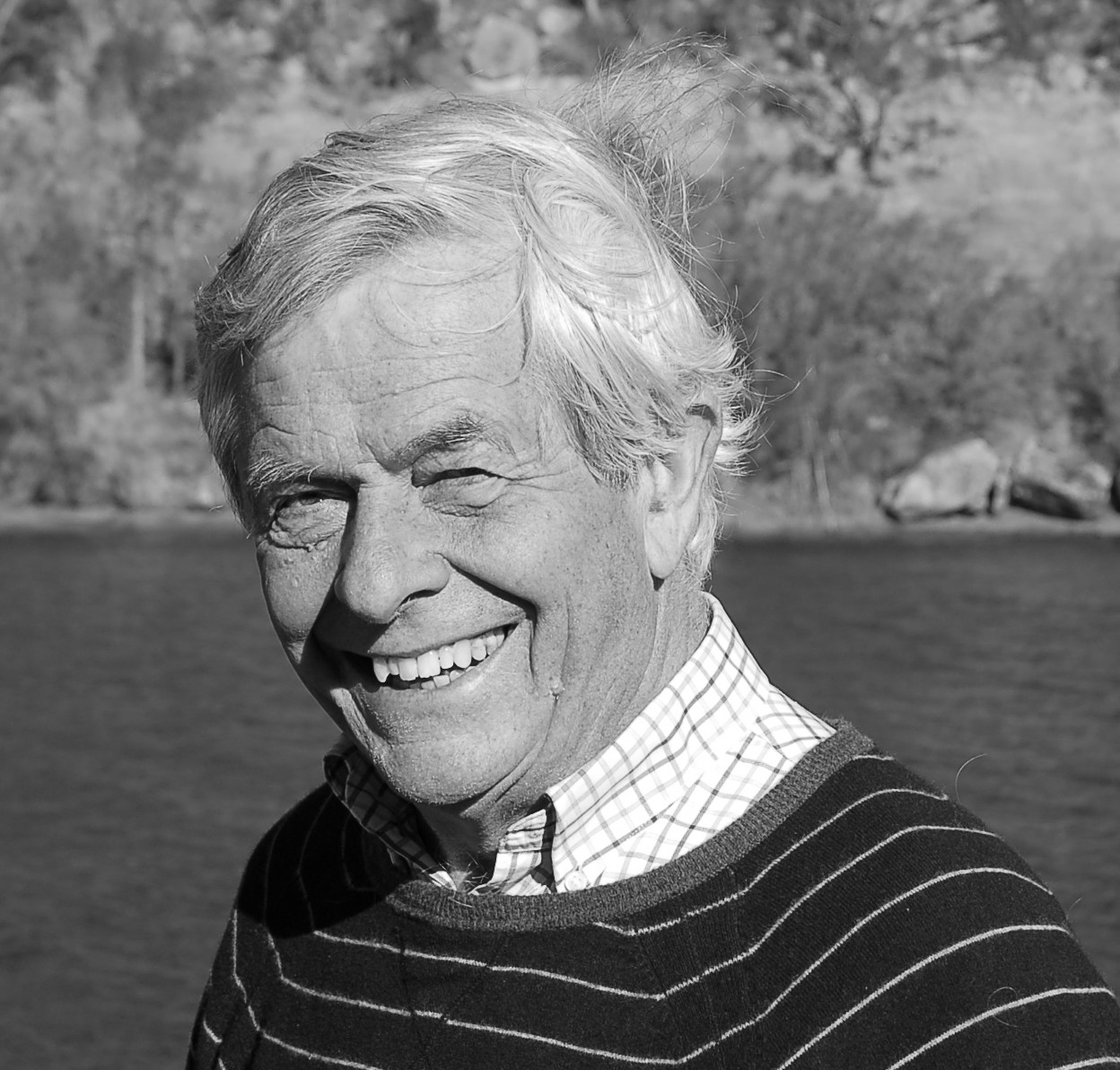
- Born: Christopher Keith Wallace-Crabbe; 6 May 1934; Richmond, Victoria, Australia
- Died: 16 December 2025 (aged 91)

Christopher Keith Wallace-Crabbe AM FAHA (6 May 1934 – 16 December 2025) was an Australian poet and academic who was an emeritus professor at the Australian Centre, University of Melbourne.

== Life and career ==
Wallace-Crabbe was born in the Melbourne suburb of Richmond. His father was Kenneth Eyre Inverell Wallace-Crabbe, painter, printmaker, journalist, publisher and a pilot in the RAF who ending World War II as a group captain. His mother Phyllis Vera May Cox Passmore was a pianist, and his brother Robin Wallace-Crabbe became an artist. He was educated at Scotch College, Yale University and the University of Melbourne, where for much of his life he worked and was a professor at the Australian Centre. He was Visiting Professor of Australian Studies at Harvard University and at the University of Venice, Ca'Foscari. He was also an essayist, a critic of the visual arts and a notable public reader of his verse. He was the founding director of the Australian Centre and, more recently, chair of the peak artistic body, Australian Poetry Limited.

After leaving school, Wallace-Crabbe set out to be a metallurgist but was drawn back to his childhood interest in books and art. After training in the Royal Australian Air Force, he worked as an electrical trade journalist while studying for his B.A. in the evenings. He published his first book of poetry while doing his final honours year. In 1961, he became the Lockie Fellow in Australian Literature and Creative Writing at the University of Melbourne.

Over the next decades he became a reader in English and then held a personal chair from 1988. On the initiative of H. C. Coombs, he was a Harkness Fellow at Yale University from 1965 to 1967, mixing widely with American writers and developing his poetry in new directions. In later years, he spent time in Italy, reading and translating Italian verse, including two contrast cantos from Dante. He was also a member of the Psychosocial Group, an occasional body with psychoanalytic as well as cultural interests.

Wallace-Crabbe's early collections were published in Australia, but in 1985 he began to publish with Oxford University Press, reaching an international public. Although he published some of his criticism and his one novel elsewhere, he remained with Oxford until 1998, after which date it ceased publishing live poets. He then took his work to Carcanet Oxford Poets in Manchester. Back in Australia he brought out two books with the Sydney firm of Brandl & Schlesinger. One of these was a highly experimental long poem, or "zany epic", on which he had been working for a dozen years. The dense and difficult poem divided the poet's readers.

Reviewers over the years have drawn attention to the mixture of language which very often marks Wallace-Crabbe's poetry. For the poet, this not only testifies to his wide interest in language but also to his sense of the stubborn plurality of our experience. Such mixed diction certainly persists in his last books, particularly in his sonnets and in the "Domestic Sublime" sequence of lyrics. This corresponds to his sense that poetry is, residually, a art with its attention divided between ontology and epistemology. For Wallace-Crabbe our lives unreasonably mingle the comic with the tragic.

Following his retirement from university teaching he continued to live in inner Melbourne, adhering to poetry, reading history and playing tennis.

In May 2014, Wallace-Crabbe alluded to the possibility of a collaboration with a Melbourne writer, Christopher Bantick. He was working on the history of Western magic and a series of prints with Kristin Headlam based upon his long poem mentioned above.

Wallace-Crabbe died on 16 December 2025 at the age of 91.

== Awards ==
- 1958 – John Masefield Prize for Poetry
- 1984 – Fellow of the Australian Academy of the Humanities
- 1985 – Grace Leven Prize for Poetry for The Amorous Cannibal
- 1987 – The Dublin Prize for Arts and Science, awarded through the University of Melbourne
- 1992 – Human Rights and Equal Opportunity Commission Poetry Award with Kerry Flattley for From the Republic of Conscience
- 1995 – winner of "The Age" Book of the Year, and the D.J. O'Hearn Prize for Poetry
- 2002 – winner of the Philip Hodgins Memorial Medal at the Mildura Writer's Festival
- 2002 – Centenary Medal
- 2006 – Doctor of Letters honoris causa (Melb.)
- 2011 – appointed a Member of the Order of Australia (AM)
- 2015 – Melbourne Prize for Literature
- 2019 – NSW Premier's Literary Awards, Kenneth Slessor Prize for Poetry, shortlisted for Rondo.

== Bibliography ==
=== Poetry ===
Collections

- 1959: The Music of Division, Sydney: Angus & Robertson
- 1962: Eight Metropolitan Poems, Adelaide: Australian Letters; with John Brack
- 1963: In Light and Darkness, Sydney: Angus & Robertson
- 1963: Eight By Eight, Brisbane: Jacaranda Press, 1963: anthology of eight poems each by Vincent Buckley, Laurence Collinson, Alexander Craig, Max Dunn, Noel Macainsh, David Martin, R.A. Simpson, and Chris Wallace-Crabbe.
- 1967: The Rebel General, Sydney: Angus & Robertson
- 1971: Where the Wind Came, Sydney: Angus and Robertson
- 1973: Selected Poems, Sydney: Angus & Robertson
- 1976: The Foundations of Joy, (Poets of the Month Series), Sydney: Angus & Robertson
- 1979: The Emotions Are Not Skilled Workers, Sydney: Angus & Robertson
- 1985: The Amorous Cannibal, Oxford: Oxford University Press
- 1988: I'm Deadly Serious, Oxford: Oxford University Press
- 1989: Sangue e l'acqua, translated and edited by Giovann Distefano, Abano Terme: Piovan Editore
- 1990: For Crying Out Loud, Oxford: Oxford University Press
- 1993: Rungs of Time, Oxford: Oxford University Press
- 1995: Selected Poems : 1956–1994, Oxford: Oxford University Press
- 1998: Whirling, Oxford: Oxford University Press
- 2001: By and Large, Manchester: Carcanet; and Sydney; Brandl and Schlesinger
- 2003: A Representative Human, Brunswick: Gungurru Press
- 2004: Next, Brunswick: Gungurru Press
- 2005: The Universe Looks Down, Brandl & Schlesinger, ISBN 1-876040-74-2
- 2006: Then, Brunswick: Gungurru Press
- 2008: Telling a Hawk to a Handsaw, Manchester Carcanet Oxford Poets
- 2010: Puck, Brunswick: Gungurru Press
- 2012: New and Selected Poems, Manchester: Carcanet Oxford Poets
- 2014: My Feet Are Hungry, Sydney: Pitt Street Poets
- 2018: Rondo, Carcanet Press

Recordings

- 1973: Vinyl record: Chris Wallace-Crabbe Reads From His Own Verse, St Lucia
- 1999: "The Universe Looks Down", with Linda Kouvaras, Move Records
- 2000: The Poems; Brunswick: Gungurru Press
- 2009: "The Domestic Sublime", Sydney: River Road Press
- 2024: "Melbourne", Melbourne: River Road Press

Selected list of poems

Title	Year	First published	Reprinted/collected
"Noah"	1965	Wallace-Crabbe, Chris (March 1965). "Noah". Meanjin Quarterly. 24 (1): 128.	The Rebel General, Angus and Robertson, 1967, p40
"Other People"	1971	We Took Their Orders and Are Dead : An Anti-War Anthology edited by Shirley Cass, Ros Cheney, David Malouf, and Michael Wilding, in 1971,	Where the Wind Came : Poems, Angus and Robertson, 1971, p47

=== Fiction ===
- 1981: Splinters, Adelaide

=== Literary criticism ===
- 1974: Melbourne or the Bush: Essays on Australian Literature and Society, Sydney: Angus & Robertson
- 1979: Toil and Spin: Two Directions in Modern Poetry, Melbourne: Hutchinson
- 1983: Three Absences in Australian Writing, Townsville: Foundation for Australian Literary Studies
- 1990: Poetry and Belief, Hobart: University of Tasmania, 1990
- 1990: Falling into Language, Melbourne: Oxford University Press
- 2005: "Read It Again", Cambridge: Salt

=== Book reviews ===
- Wallace-Crabbe, Chris (June 2011). "'Free as the hawks above us' : art in the happenstance of the organic". Australian Book Review (332): 46–47. Review of Barry Hill; John Wolseley (2011). Lines for birds : poems and paintings. UWA Publishing. ISBN 9781921401534.

=== Edited ===
- 1963: Six Voices: Contemporary Australian Poets, Sydney: Angus & Robertson; American Edition, Westport, 1979
- 1971: Australian Poetry 1971, Sydney: Angus & Robertson
- 1980: The Golden Apples of the Sun : Twentieth Century Australian Poetry, Melbourne: Melbourne University Press.
- 1981: The Australian Nationalists: Modern Critical Essays, Melbourne: Oxford University Press, (with Peter Pierce),
- 1984: Clubbing of the Gunfire: 101 Australian War Poems, Melbourne: Melbourne University Press, 1984 (with D. Goodman and D.J. Hearn)
- 1991: Multicultural Australia: the Challenges of Change, Newham (with Kerry Flattley),
- 1992: From the Republic of Conscience, Melbourne: Aird Books in association with Amnesty International; and New York: White Pine Press, 1992 (with Kerry Flattley and Sigurdur A. Magnusson), ISBN 0-947214-21-6
- 1994: Ur Riki Samviskunnar, Reykjavik: Amnesty International
- 1998: Author, Author! Tales of Australian Literary Life, Melbourne: O.U.P., 1998 (with Harold Bolitho)
- 1998: Associate Editor (with Bruce Bennett and Jennifer Strauss): The Oxford Literary History of Australia, Melbourne: Oxford University Press
- 1998: Approaching Australia: Papers from the Harvard Australian Studies Symposium, Cambridge, Massachusetts: Harvard University Committee on Australian Studies
- 2002: La Poésie Australienne, Valenciennes: Presses Universitaires, (with Simone Kadi)
- 2004: "Imagining Australia: Literature and Culture in the New New World", Cambridge Mass: Harvard University Committee on Australian Studies. With Judith Ryan
- 2009: "Mappings of the Plane: New Selected Poems" by Gwen Harwood (with Gregory Kratzmann), Manchester: Carcanet Fyfield Books

=== Artist's books with the artist Bruno Leti ===
- 1994: "Drawing", Melbourne: Australian Print Workshop
- 1995: "Apprehensions", Melbourne: the artist
- 1996: "New Year", Melbourne and Canberra: the artist
- 1996: "The Iron Age", Melbourne: the artist
- 1999: "Timber", New York: the artist and Raphael Fodde; with Inge and Grahame King
- 2001: "The Alignments Two", Melbourne: the artist
- 2002: "Colours", Melbourne: the artist
- 2004: "The Alignments One", Melbourne: the artist
- 2005: "Morandrian", the artist and Alan Loney
- 2011: "Camaldulensis", Melbourne: the artist

=== Other artists' books ===
- 2006: "All Writing Still is to be Done", Vicenza: L'Officina; with Marco Fazzini and Gianluca Murasecchi
- 2005: "The Flowery Meadow" (after Dante), Melbourne: Electio Editions; with Alan Loney and Bruno Leti
- 2007: "Skin, Surfaces and Shadows", Warrandyte; with Tommaso Durante
- 2011: "limes", Warrandyte; with Tommaso Durante

=== Critical studies and reviews ===
New and selected poems

- Lehmann, Geoffrey (April 2013). "Giving it a go : brilliantly observed and precise poems". Australian Book Review. 350: 24–25.
