= Rose Lorraine =

1869 poem by Australian poet Henry Kendall

- by Henry Kendall
- First published in: Leaves from Australian Forests
- Country: Australia
- Language: English
- Publication date: 1869
- Lines: 56

Full text
- The Poems of Henry Kendall/Rose Lorraine at Wikisource

"Rose Lorraine" (1869) is a poem by Australian poet Henry Kendall.

It was originally published in the author's collection of poems, Leaves from Australian Forests, in 1869, and was subsequently reprinted in the author's single-author collections and a number of Australian poetry anthologies.

== Critical reception ==
A tribute to Kendall, originally published in the London newspaper, St James's Gazette, and reprinted in The Australian Star, drew special attention to "the marvellous girl, 'Rose Lorraine', of whom he writes in that curious tone of passionate humility, desiring only, for the reward of all the sorrow she has given him, that she should have one remembrance", that is "Your tender speeches".

In an overview of Kendall's work, a writer in The Sydney Mail looked at how Kendall allowed his environment to enter his work, though not all the time. "There are times when, like all poets, Kendall borrows grief. When the scrip is empty one must borrow something, and sorrow is loaned at lighter rate than joy. At such times he touches with delicacy and restraint and a knd of middle-age sadness upon some theme of old regret, as in 'Rose Lorraine,' or flashes fitfully into the all-too-brief music of some ardent lyric."

== Publication history ==
After the poem's initial publication in Leaves from Australian Forests in 1869 it was reprinted as follows:

- An Anthology of Australian Verse edited by Bertram Stevens, Angus and Robertson, 1907
- The Golden Treasury of Australian Verse edited by Bertram Stevens, Angus and Robertson, 1909
- Rose Lorraine and Other Poems by Henry Kendall, W. H. Honey, 1945
- Selected Poems of Henry Kendall edited by T. Inglis Moore, Angus and Robertson, 1957
- A Treasury of Colonial Poetry, Currawong, 1982
- Henry Kendall: Poetry, Prose and Selected Correspondence edited by Michael Ackland, University of Queensland Press, 1993
- The Oxford Book of Australian Love Poems edited by Jennifer Strauss, Oxford University Press, 1993
- Australian Verse : An Oxford Anthology edited by John Leonard, Oxford University Press, 1998

== Note ==
- The subject of this poem is presumed to be Rose Bennett, daughter of Samuel Bennett, who was co-proprietor of The Empire newspaper in Sydney.

== See also ==
- 1869 in Australian literature
- 1869 in poetry
