= Beyond Kerguelen =

1880 poem by Australian poet Henry Kendall

- by Henry Kendall
- First published in: The Sydney Mail
- Country: Australia
- Language: English
- Publication date: 19 June 1880
- Lines: 84

Full text
- Beyond Kerguelen at Wikisource

"Beyond Kerguelen" (1880) is a poem by Australian poet Henry Kendall.

It was originally published in the The Sydney Mail newspaper on 19 June 1880, and was subsequently reprinted in the author's single-author collections and a number of Australian poetry anthologies.

== Critical reception ==
Critic J. Howlett-Ross, in a short essay about Kendall's work, noted that this poem "is one of the poet's most characteristic pieces of work. It has a wealth of words and use of them not inferior, I will venture to say, to the copious and marvellous diction of Swinburne."

In a review of the poet's collection Songs from the Mountains in The Australian Town and Country Journal a writer made some extravagant claims, noting that the poem "is in the author's most characteristic style, and is of a very high order of writing, with lines in it, here and there, of weird wildness, that probably no living writer has excelled."

Michael Ackland emphasised the darkness in the poem saying that it is "appropriately described in terms of absence, antithesis, blindness and chaos – stock attributes of spiritual darkness."

== Publication history ==
After the poem's initial publication in The Sydney Mail newspaper in 1880 it was reprinted as follows:

- Songs from the Mountains by Henry Kendall, William Maddock, 1880
- The Oxford Book of Australasian Verse edited by Walter Murdoch, Oxford University Press, 1918
- Selected Poems of Henry Kendall edited by T. Inglis Moore, Angus and Robertson, 1957
- From the Ballads to Brennan edited by T. Inglis Moore, Angus & Robertson, 1964
- The Poetical Works of Henry Kendall edited by Thomas Thornton Reed, 1966
- Australian Verse from 1805 : A Continuum edited by Geoffrey Dutton, Rigby, 1976
- The New Oxford Book of Australian Verse edited by Les Murray, Oxford University Press, 1986

== See also ==
- 1880 in Australian literature
- 1880 in poetry
