= The Song of the Cattle Hunters =

1861 poem by Australian poet Henry Kendall

- by Henry Kendall
- First published in: The Empire
- Country: Australia
- Language: English
- Publication date: 2 November 1861
- Lines: 22

Full text
- The Song of the Cattle Hunters at Wikisource

"The Song of the Cattle Hunters" (1861) is a poem by Australian poet Henry Kendall.

It was originally published in The Empire newspaper on 2 November 1861 under the title "The Cattle Hunters", and was subsequently reprinted in the author's single-author collections and a number of Australian poetry anthologies.

== Critical reception ==
While reviewing a manuscript of Elijah and Other Poems, a Kendall collection that does not appear to have been published, a reviewer in The Sydney Morning Herald called this poem "full of strength and vigour."

In a review of the poet's collection Leaves from Australian Forests, a writer in The North Eastern Ensign (Benalla, Victoria) commented that this poem was a "pure song". They went on to state that it was "exquisite for affluence of color and delicacy of touch [and it has] the breezy melody and rushing sweep of the true ringing lyric".

== Publication history ==
After the poem's initial publication in The Empire newspaper in 1861 it was reprinted as follows:

- The Sydney Morning Herald, 5 November 1861, with the title "The Song of the Cattle Hunters"
- The Illawarra Mercury, 6 December 1861 (the author revised the poem for this publication)
- Poems and Songs by Henry Kendall, J. R. Clarke, 1862
- The Poets and Prose Writers of New South Wales by G. B. Barton, Gibbs, Shallard and Co., 1866
- The Athenaeum, 17 February 1866
- The Round Table, 17 March 1866
- The Sydney Morning Herald, 11 May 1866
- Leaves from Australian Forests by Henry Kendall, George Robertson, 1869
- Poems of Henry Kendall by Henry Kendall, George Robertson, 1886
- The Children's Treasury of Australian Verse edited by Bertram Stevens and George Mackaness, Angus and Robertson, 1913
- Selections from Australian Poets edited by Bertram Stephens and George Mackaness, Cornstalk Publishing, 1925
- New Song in an Old Land edited by Rex Ingamells, 1943
- Australian Bush Songs and Ballads edited by Will Lawson, Frank Johnson, 1944
- Selected Poems of Henry Kendall edited by T. Inglis Moore, Angus and Robertson, 1957
- The Poetical Works of Henry Kendall edited by Thomas Thornton Reed, 1966
- A Treasury of Bush Verse edited by G. A. Wilkes, Angus and Robertson, 1991
- The Penguin Book of Australian Ballads edited by Elizabeth Webby and Philip Butterss, Penguin, 1993
- Sense, Shape, Symbol : An Investigation of Australian Poetry edited by Brian Keyte, Phoenix Education, 2013

== See also ==
- 1861 in Australian literature
- 1861 in poetry
