= 1869 in Australian literature =

This article presents a list of the historical events and publications of Australian literature during 1869.

== Books ==
- Maud Jeanne Franc — Silken Cords and Iron Fetters
- Louisa Anne Meredith— Phoebe's Mother : A Novel (aka Ebba)

== Short stories ==
- Marcus Clarke — "Pretty Dick"

== Children's and young adult fiction ==
- Henry Kingsley — The Boy in Grey

== Poetry ==
- Emma Frances Anderson — "No Room for the Dead"
- Henry Kendall
  - "Aboriginal Death-Song"
  - Leaves from Australian Forests
  - "Rose Lorraine"

== Drama ==
- William Akhurst — The House That Jack Built

== Births ==
A list, ordered by date of birth (and, if the date is either unspecified or repeated, ordered alphabetically by surname) of births in 1869 of Australian literary figures, authors of written works or literature-related individuals follows, including year of death.

- 5 January — R. H. Croll, author and public servant (died 1947)
- 12 May — Frank Morton, poet (died 1923)
- 4 July — Ernest Buley, journalist and author (died 1933)
- 10 July — Arthur Gask, novelist (died 1951)
- 3 August — Marie Pitt, poet and journalist (died 1948)
- 6 August
  - David McKee Wright, poet (died 1928)
  - Marie E. J. Pitt, poet (died 1948)
- 7 August — E. J. Brady, poet (died 1952)
- 21 August — Will H. Ogilvie, poet (died 1963)
- 24 September — Edward Sorenson, poet (died 1939)
- 3 October — Ada Augusta Holman, journalist and novelist (died 1949)

== See also ==
- 1869 in Australia
- 1869 in literature
- 1869 in poetry
- List of years in Australian literature
- List of years in literature
