= To a Mountain =

1880 poem by Australian poet Henry Kendall

- by Henry Kendall
- First published in: Songs from the Mountains
- Country: Australia
- Language: English
- Publication date: 1880

Full text
- The Poems of Henry Kendall/To a Mountain at Wikisource

"To a Mountain" (1880) is a poem by Australian poet Henry Kendall.

It was originally published in the poet's collection Songs from the Mountains in 1880 and was subsequently reprinted in the author's single-author collections and a number of Australian poetry anthologies.

The poems is also known as "Dedication : To a Mountain" as it was placed as an introductory poem for his collection.

== Critical reception ==
A reviewer in The Australasian noted the poem's "feeling of the calm majesty of nature" in a review of the poet's collection Songs from the Mountains.

Judith Wright, looking at Kendall's work in Preoccupations in Australian Poetry called it "deeply interesting, because in it, for the first time, Kendall transcends his central and tormenting preoccupation, his yearning for peace and the past and the Eden-rivers of his childhood, and (literally) looks down on his dream-valleys from a new height."

== Publication history ==
After the poem's initial publication in Songs from the Mountains in 1880 it was reprinted as follows:

- An Anthology of Australian Verse edited by Bertram Stevens, Angus and Robertson, 1907
- The Golden Treasury of Australian Verse edited by Bertram Stevens, Angus and Robertson, 1909
- An Australasian Anthology : Australian and New Zealand Poems edited by Percival Serle, R. H. Croll, and Frank Wilmot, Collins, 1927
- New Land, New Language : An Anthology of Australian Verse edited by Judith Wright, Oxford University Press, 1957
- Selected Poems of Henry Kendall edited by T. Inglis Moore, Angus and Robertson, 1957
- The Poetical Works of Henry Kendall edited by Thomas Thornton Reed, 1966
- A Treasury of Colonial Poetry, Currawong, 1982
- The Oxford Anthology of Australian Literature edited by Leonie Kramer and Adrian Mitchell, Oxford University Press, 1985
- Henry Kendall: Poetry, Prose and Selected Correspondence edited by Michael Ackland, University of Queensland Press, 1993

== See also ==
- 1880 in Australian literature
- 1880 in poetry
