= Bertram Stevens =

Bertram Stevens may refer to:

- Bertram Stevens (politician) (1889–1973), Australian politician
- Bertram Stevens (critic) (1872–1922), Australian literary critic and editor
- Bert L. Stevens (1905–1964), American film and TV actor, brother of Barbara Stanwyck
