= Jim the Splitter =

1880 poem by Australian poet Henry Kendall

- by Henry Kendall
- Country: Australia
- Language: English
- Publisher: The Freeman's Journal
- Publication date: 21 February 1880
- Lines: 90

Full text
- The Poems of Henry Kendall/Jim the Splitter at Wikisource

"Jim the Splitter" (1880) is a poem by Australian writer Henry Kendall.

It was originally published in The Freeman's Journal vol. 31 no. 1877 21 February 1880, and was subsequently reprinted in collections of the writer's poetry and in a number of Australian poetry anthologies.

== Synopsis ==
The poet provides a description of Jim, a wood splitter, who is "a subject no singer should choose". Jim is not poetical in any way, nor is he "of the Pericles type." Rather he "is modern right up from the toe to the pipe". Jim sticks to his grandfather's adage of short-counting his bundles of shingles and substituting lesser timbers for those ordered. For all of that he is master of saw and axe.

== Critical reception ==
In an overview of Kendall's poetry a critic in The Maitland Mercury and Hunter River General Advertiser commented that this "'Jim' is a very poor specimen of a man, in any sense of the term–though he is, most unfortunately, the representative of by no means a small class of beings whom we may meet at any time in a day's travel in our country towns, besides in Wollombi, and, sorry I am to add, in other towns that are not in the country."

While reviewing the 1903 volume Poems of Henry Clarence Kendall a writer in The Freeman's Journal noted that although "Kendall's Muse was mainly a melancholy one", he did write some humorous poetry. This verse is offered as an example.

== Publication history ==
After the poem's initial publication in The Freeman's Journal in February 1880 it was reprinted as follows:

- Songs from the Mountains by Henry Kendall, William Maddock, 1880
- The Sydney Mail and New South Wales Advertiser, 12 August 1882
- Poems of Henry Clarence Kendall, George Robertson, 1903
- Selected Poems of Henry Kendall edited by T. Inglis Moore, Angus and Robertson, 1957
- From the Ballads to Brennan edited by T. Inglis Moore, Angus & Robertson, 1964
- The Poetical Works of Henry Kendall edited by Thomas Thornton Reed, 1966
- My Country : Australian Poetry and Short Stories, Two Hundred Years edited by Leonie Kramer, Lansdowne, 1985
- Henry Kendall: Poetry, Prose and Selected Correspondence edited by Michael Ackland, University of Queensland Press, 1993

== See also ==
- 1880 in Australian literature
- 1880 in poetry
