= Fernleigh Castle =

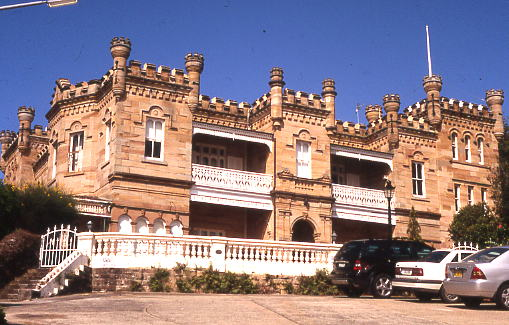
- Interactive map of the Fernleigh Castle area
- Alternative names: Fernleigh

General information
- Status: Completed
- Type: Castle; mansion
- Architectural style: Victorian
- Location: 5 Fernleigh Gardens, Rose Bay, Sydney, New South Wales, Australia
- Coordinates: 33°52′05″S 151°16′21″E
- Client: Frank Bennett (1892)

Technical details
- Material: Sydney sandstone; cedar joinery

Other information
- Number of rooms: c. 30

Register of the National Estate
- Official name: Fernleigh Castle, 5 Fernleigh Gdn, Rose Bay, NSW, Australia
- Designated: 21 March 1978
- Reference no.: 2495
- Class: Historic

New South Wales Heritage Database (Local Government Register)
- Official name: Fernleigh Castle - main building
- Type: Built
- Designated: 10 March 1995
- Reference no.: Local register
- Group/collection: Residential buildings (private)
- Category: Mansion

Fernleigh Castle is a historic house in the Sydney suburb of Rose Bay, New South Wales, Australia. Completed in the Victorian architectural style, the house is listed on the (now defunct) Australian Register of the National Estate and the Woollahra local government heritage database.

== History and description ==
Fernleigh Castle was built in 1892 on the site of a sandstone cottage built in 1874, by Charles Warman Roberts and his wife Annie, nee Marsden. Charles and Annie owned the Roberts Hotel, which was located on the site where Gowings now sits in the city. Charles and Annies first born also Charles, was mayor of Sydney and Postmaster General. Their other son, Melnotte Roberts, was awarded an Order of the Dragon for his esteemed position in Australian Defence. His jacket is now displayed at the war memorial in Canberra, and Annie and Charles have portraits at the National Art Gallery in Canberra. Melnotte founded Manly Surf Club, and his son, Reg, was the first man to swim from point to point at Manly. Marjorie Roberts is the woman in an Archibald Prize-winning painting, and the "Idle Hour" portrait also depicts the Roberts family, a family that was part of the original pioneers of Australia. The new part of the home incorporates the original walls of that building. Castle-like in appearance, it is constructed of sandstone and features a square Norman-style tower, smaller towers with their own turrets, and castellated walls. Although it also includes wrought iron balconies similar to homes in Paddington. The house has thirty rooms and a number of stained-glass windows.

== Heritage listing ==
One of the very few large Victorian mansions still intact in Sydney. A product of the 1890's boom, the structure is a highly decorated example of the stonemason's craft using pink to brown fine dressed sandstone, still in very good condition. The interiors of the main rooms are very decorative contained elaborate plaster ornamentation to walls, piers and archways. Much original cedar joinery remaining and fine crafts example in the main stair. Other notable items include large tiled fireplaces framed by finely carved mahogany mantels with marble pillars supports, intricate stained glass windows, large bedroom (35ft by 18ft) three feet deep porcelain bath in cedar and marble frame, figured of white zinc.

== See also ==
- Site of Ficus superba var. henneana tree
