= Bill the Bullock Driver =

Poem by Henry Kendall

- by Henry Kendall
- First published in: The Australian Town and Country Journal
- Country: Australia
- Language: English
- Publication date: 1 April 1876
- Preceded by: "While Wandering"
- Followed by: "Kingsborough"

Full text
- Bill the Bullock-Driver at Wikisource

"Bill the Bullock Driver" is a poem by Australian writer Henry Kendall that was first published in The Australian Town and Country Journal on 1 April 1876.

It was later included in the author's poetry collection Songs from the Mountains (1880), and was subsequently reprinted in various newspapers, magazines and poetry anthologies (see below).

== Reception ==
A reviewer in Mount Gambier's Border Watch newspaper saw a new direction for the poet emerging, finding that the poem "...is conceived in a spirit of singular power. It is an absolute study of a phase of Australian forest life. It is a virtual word-photograph, drawn by a genuine son of Apollo. It is characterised by both genius and truth, and had not Kendall died shortly after he discovered his adaptability for this style of composition, we should doubtless have had some superlative studies of a peculiarly Australian type. As it is, we must recognise, without stint, the authentic mission of this poet to portray phenomenal phases of bush life. The rest is our loss."

The Oxford Companion to Australian Literature called the poem "an iconic portrait of one of Australian outback life and literature." They then go on to note that while the poet "applauds the sturdy independence and easygoing nature of the teamster, he also subtly criticises his parochialism and insensitivity to the natural wonders that surround him."

== Further publications ==
- Songs from the Mountains by Henry Kendall (1880)
- The Children's Treasury of Australian Verse edited by Bertram Stevens (1913)
- Selections from Australian Poets edited by Bertram Stevens (1925)
- Selected Poems of Henry Kendall edited by T. Inglis Moore (1957)
- Cross-Country : A Book of Australian Verse edited by John Barnes and Brian MacFarlane, Heinemann, 1988
- An Australian Treasury of Popular Verse edited by Jim Haynes (2002)
- Anthology of Bullock Poetry edited by Janice Downes (2006)

== See also ==
- 1876 in poetry
- 1876 in Australian literature
- List of years in Australian literature
- Australian literature
