= Songs from the Mountains =

Collected poems by Henry Kendall

- Author: Henry Kendall
- Language: English
- Publisher: William Maddock, Sydney
- Publication date: 1880
- Publication place: Australia
- Media type: Print (hardback & paperback)
- Pages: 230
- Preceded by: Leaves from Australian Forests

Songs from the Mountains (1880) is the third collection of poems by Australian poet Henry Kendall, and the last to be published during his lifetime. It was released in hardback by William Maddock in 1880, and features the poet's widely anthologised poems "Bill the Bullock Driver", and "Araluen".

The collection was originally published in 1880 containing the poem "The Song of Ninian Melville". Immediately after publication the publisher, believing the political satire to be possibly libelous, recalled the edition after some 250 copies had been distributed. The satire was excised and replaced by the poem "Christmas Creek". The book was re-published in January 1881. "Jack Lockley told me that, as a message-boy at Maddock's, he personally delivered to subscribers about one hundred copies of the book before word came to the shop that [Ninian] Melville was about to launch legal proceedings... Jack was promptly sent out to retrace his steps and retrieve the delivered copies. He told me he did manage to collect all but perhaps half a dozen; one copy - like most other such rarities - is now in the Mitchell Library."

The collection includes 35 poems by the author that are reprinted from various sources.

== Contents ==
- "Dedication: To a Mountain"
- "Mary Rivers"
- "Kingsborough"
- "Beyond Kerguelen"
- "Black Lizzie"
- "Hy-Brasil"
- "Jim the Splitter"
- "Mooni"
- "Pytheas"
- "Bill the Bullock Driver"
- "Cooranbean"
- "When Underneath the Brown Dead Grass"
- "The Voice in the Wild Oak"
- "Billy Vickers"
- "Persia"
- "Lilith"
- "Bob"
- "Peter the Piccaninny"
- "Narrara Creek"
- "In Memory of John Fairfax"
- "Araluen"
- "The Sydney International Exhibition"
- "The Song of Ninian Melville" (replaced in the second edition by "Christmas Creek")
- "Orara"
- "The Curse of Mother Flood"
- "On a Spanish Cathedral"
- "Rover"
- "The Melbourne International Exhibition"
- "By the Cliffs of the Sea"
- "Galatea"
- "Black Kate"
- "A Hyde Park Larrikin"
- "Names Upon a Stone"
- "Leichhardt"
- "After Many Years"

== Critical reception ==
At the time of its original publication in Australia The Sydney Mail stated: "Sad songs though many of them be, they are full of great thoughts and lofty aspirations. You may dislike them because they are not all chanted in unison with the bright noontide hymn; but you cannot deny that they are all of the music that floats high above the level of earthly grossness, and that sings, if sometimes among clouds, yet always far above the spires and mountains, although these are loftier than the level of the unbroken plains beneath."

== See also ==
- 1880 in literature
- 1880 in Australian literature
- 1880 in poetry
