= 1880 in Australian literature =

This article presents a list of the historical events and publications of Australian literature during 1880.

== Events ==
- 13 January — "The Bulletin" magazine publishes its first issue. The magazine ceased publication on 29 January 2008.

== Books ==
- Rolf Boldrewood — The Miner's Right : A Tale of the Australian Goldfields
- Ada Cambridge — A Mere Chance
- R. Murray Prior — An Australian Heroine

== Poetry ==
- Ernest Favenc — "Bound to the Mast"
- Henry Kendall
  - "Jim the Splitter"
  - "Leichhardt"
  - "The Song of Ninian Melville"
  - Songs from the Mountains
  - "To a Mountain"
- James Brunton Stephens — Miscellaneous Poems

== Drama ==
- Marcus Clarke — The Happy Land

== Births ==
A list, ordered by date of birth (and, if the date is either unspecified or repeated, ordered alphabetically by surname) of births in 1880 of Australian literary figures, authors of written works or literature-related individuals follows, including year of death.

- 29 April — Oliver Hogue, soldier, journalist and poet who wrote as Trooper Bluegum (died 1919 in London)
- 3 September — Will Dyson, poet and artist (died 1938)
- 30 November — Grant Madison Hervey, poet and author (died 1933)

Unknown date

- R. J. Cassidy, poet (died 1948)

== Deaths ==
A list, ordered by date of death (and, if the date is either unspecified or repeated, ordered alphabetically by surname) of deaths in 1880 of Australian literary figures, authors of written works or literature-related individuals follows, including year of birth.

- 11 November – Ned Kelly, bushranger and writer (born 1855)

== See also ==
- 1880 in Australia
- 1880 in literature
- 1880 in poetry
- List of years in Australian literature
- List of years in literature
