= 1868 in Australian literature =

This article presents a list of the historical events and publications of Australian literature during 1868.

== Books ==
- Marcus Clarke – Long Odds
- Maud Jeanne Franc – John's Wife

== Short stories ==
- Marcus Clarke – "Cannabis Indica : A Psychological Experiment"
- J. R. Houlding – Australian Tales and Sketches from Real Life

== Poetry ==
- Bertha Martin Boyd – "Daniel in the Lion's Den"
- Mary Fortune
  - "The Breeze from the South"
  - "Farewell to Tamanick"
- Henry Kendall
  - "A Death in the Bush"
  - "Charles Harpur"
  - "Moss on a Wall"
  - "Syrinx"
- Henry Parkes – "Brougham"

== Births ==
A list, ordered by date of birth (and, if the date is either unspecified or repeated, ordered alphabetically by surname) of births in 1868 of Australian literary figures, authors of written works or literature-related individuals follows, including year of death.

- 14 May – Mary Eliza Fullerton, writer (died 1946)
- 27 June – Randolph Bedford, poet, novelist and short story writer (died 1941)
- 29 October – Robert Crawford, poet (died 1930)
- 14 November – Steele Rudd, short story writer (died 1935)

== Deaths ==
A list, ordered by date of death (and, if the date is either unspecified or repeated, ordered alphabetically by surname) of deaths in 1868 of Australian literary figures, authors of written works or literature-related individuals follows, including year of birth.

- 26 April — James L. Michael, poet (born 1824)
- 10 June – Charles Harpur, poet (born 1813)

== See also ==
- 1868 in Australia
- 1868 in literature
- 1868 in poetry
- List of years in Australian literature
- List of years in literature
