= The Song of Ninian Melville =

Poem by Henry Kendall

- by Henry Kendall
- Written: 1880
- First published in: Songs from the Mountains
- Country: Australia
- Language: English

Full text
- The Song of Ninian Melville at Wikisource

"The Song of Ninian Melville" is a poem by Australian writer Henry Kendall that was first published in the author's suppressed edition of his poetry collection, Songs from the Mountains in 1880. The poem is a set of verses satirising Ninian Melville, at that time Member for Northumberland in the Parliament of New South Wales. Immediately after publication the publisher, believing the political satire to be possibly libellous, recalled the edition after some 250 copies had been distributed. The satire was excised and replaced by the poem "Christmas Creek". The book was re-published in January 1881.

== Reception ==
Reporting on a debate in the NSW Parliament in April 1887, The Sydney Mail reported: "The discussion, as a whole, upon the motion was not interesting, but it brought out a telling hit from Mr. Cameron at Mr. Melville by the former introducing into what he had to say the last verse of an unpublished poem by the late Henry Kendall. 'It might,' said Mr. Cameron, 'be very appropriately called, "The Song of Ninian Melville." I believe it appeared in a volume published by the late Henry Kendall, but as there was some threat of a libel action, it had to be withdrawn. However, Kendall cannot be charged with libel now, and I will read the last verse to the hon. gentleman. It describes him exactly.' And then with dramatic action and suitable emphasis, he read: —

House with high august traditions, Chamber where the voice of Lowe,
And the lordly words of Wentworth sounded thirty years ago;
Halls familiar to our fathers, where in days exalted rung
All the tones and all the feelings which ennobled Bland and Lang.
We in ashes, we in sackcloth, sorrow for the insult cast
By a crowd of bitter boobies, on the grandeur of the past.
Take again your penny whistle, boy, it is no good to me,
Last invention is a bladder with the title of M.P.

To say that the House laughed does not nearly describe the manner in which hon. members enjoyed the fun. Mr. Melville, white-faced, and very ill at ease, challenged Mr. Cameron to read the whole poem outside, and by some means becoming impressed with the idea that Mr. Hugh Taylor was at the bottom of the business, he challenged the member for Parramatta to say where he had had the poem printed, and said he would make him answer for it in the Supreme Court. Mr. Taylor looked a little uncomfortable, but only smiled."

== Further publications ==
- Songs from the Mountains by Henry Kendall (1880)
- Selected Poems of Henry Kendall edited by T. Inglis Moore, Angus and Robertson, 1957
- The Poetical Works of Henry Kendall edited by Thomas Thornton Reed, 1966
- Bards in the Wilderness : Australian Colonial Poetry to 1920 edited by Adrian Mitchell and Brian Elliott, Nelson, 1970
- The Penguin Book of Australian Verse edited by Harry Heseltine, Penguin Books, 1972
- The Penguin Book of Australian Satirical Verse edited by Philip Neilsen, Penguin, 1986
- The Sting in the Wattle : Australian Satirical Verse edited by Philip Neilsen, University of Queensland Press, 1993
- Henry Kendall: Poetry, Prose and Selected Correspondence edited by Michael Ackland, University of Queensland Press, 1993
- Australian Verse : An Oxford Anthology edited by John Leonard, Oxford University Press, 1998
- The Puncher & Wattmann Anthology of Australian Poetry edited by John Leonard, Puncher & Wattmann, 2009

== See also ==
- 1880 in poetry
- 1880 in Australian literature
- Australian literature
