= Site of Ficus superba var. henneana tree =

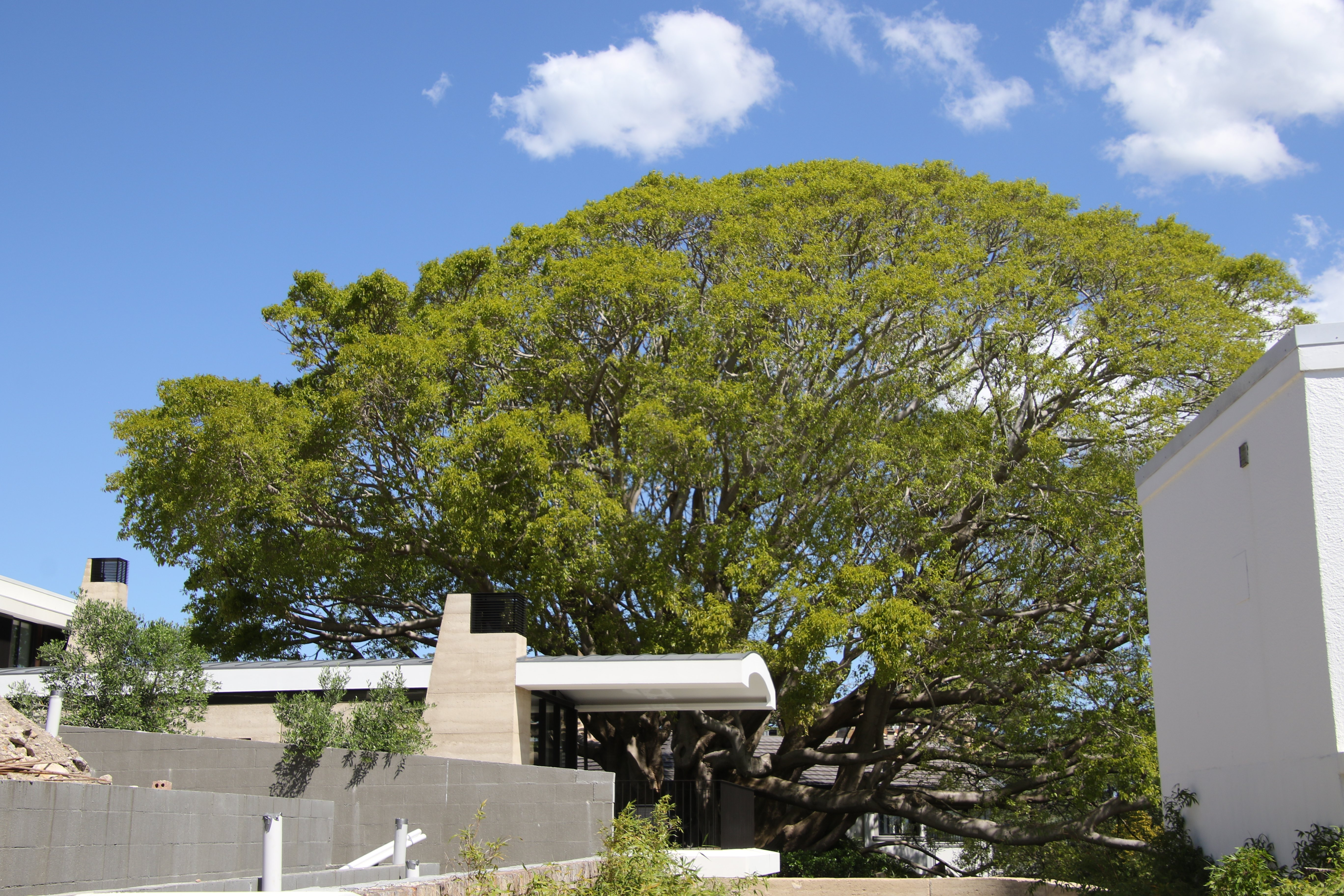
- Ficus virens at Fernleigh Castle, Rose Bay

- Location within Sydney Location within Australia
- 33.8677°S 151.2727°E
- Location: 3–4 Fernleigh Gardens, Rose Bay, New South Wales, Australia

History
- Built: 1827

New South Wales Heritage Register
- Official name: Site of Ficus superba var. henneana tree; Cedar fig; superb fig; Port Hacking fig; formerly part of Fernleigh Castle / The Ferns grounds
- Type: State heritage (landscape)
- Designated: 2 April 1999
- Reference no.: 578
- Type: Tree
- Category: Parks, Gardens and Trees

Site of Ficus superba var. henneana tree is a heritage-listed individual tree at 3–4 Fernleigh Gardens, Rose Bay, New South Wales, Australia. It was planted during 1827. It is also known as Cedar fig, superb fig and Port Hacking fig; formerly part of Fernleigh Castle; The Ferns grounds. It was added to the New South Wales State Heritage Register on 2 April 1999. The identification of the tree is confirmed as the White Fig (Ficus virens), not indigenous to Sydney.

== History ==
The fig tree is dated to c. 1827 and is probably a remnant of pre-European settlement Eastern Suburbs vegetation.

In 1831 Samuel Breakwell of Cork, Ureland was granted 24 hectares (60 acres) of land at Rose Bay, which he promptly sold. The land was so remote from settlement, that it was not until 1874 that the then owner, Charles Warman Roberts built himself a cottage named "the Ferns". He was a member of the family who established and conducted the famous Roberts Hotel in Market Street, Sydney, until it closed in the early 1960s.

The Ferns was built on land that was part of the Tivoli estate.

=== Development as Fernleigh Castle estate ===
In 1881 the property, known as Fernleigh, was sold to Frank Bennett, proprietor of the Sydney newspaper The Evening News. Bennett is known to have spent heavily to have Fernleigh enlarged and remodelled into its present, a replica of a Scottish castle that is now known as Fernleigh Castle, located at what is now 5 Fernleigh Gardens. This work took place between 1881 and 1892. The original stone cottage, which had been extensively enlarged, was not demolished. It was incorporated in the castle and forms the present lounge room, dining room and principal's office. The original hardwood flooring in the present lounge and dining rooms had been dressed with an adze. It was still in perfect condition when carpeted over in the early 1960s. The caretaker's cottage in Victorian Gothic style remains although considerably modified, was built by Bennett near the entrance to the drive on New South Head Road. A photo of 1910 shows this cottage and the entry gates and drive, with sandstone gate piers and what appears to be an iron palisade fence to New South Head Road, and dense tree plantings including a Norfolk Island pine (Araucaria heterophylla).

Shortly before 1920 Fernleigh was leased for two years by Dame Nellie Melba, opera diva, who caused a mild uproar by having some of the trees cut down to widen the view of the harbour. At that time the 2.8 hectares (7 acres) of land extended to New South Head Road and the castle was approached through a magnificent drive flanked by beautiful lawns and gardens. In 1920 the property was bought by Mrs E. M. C. Watt, wife of New Zealand racehorse owner, Edward James Watt who had settled in Australia and had extensive grazing interests. A 1943 aerial photograph shows the fig with its canopy approximately 25% of its current stage (sic: extent) and with an Araucaria growing immediately to the south of it. At that time the tree was located on the curtilage of Fernleigh Castle. E. J. Watt died in 1942 but his wife lived on here until her death in 1950.

In April 1951 it was sold to a syndicate which subdivided and sold about 2.4 hectares (6 acres) of land lying between the castle and New South Head Road. Shortly afterwards the remainder was bought by Mr William Buckingham, director of the well known Oxford Street store, Buckinghams Ltd. When Buckingham's original plans fell through he tried to sell the property without success. At this stage Fernleigh was vacant and became vandalised. A plan to sell it to the Government of Czechoslovakia as their consulate was well underway when the Petrov affair blew up and wrecked the project. British airline BOAC decided to buy it as their Sydney HQ but the sudden failure of their early Comet aircraft forced a radical change of plans. Architects were called in to test the walls and the general layout of the building with the idea of converting it into five self-contained flats. Masons had actually picked testing holes in the sandstone walls when this plan was abandoned.

At the same time a charitable order of the Roman Catholic Church had been toying with the idea of buying the Castle but had not been able to reach a decision. Towards the end of 1954 Bruce Jackson was driving along New South Head Road when he saw a notice offering second hand shop fittings for sale. Jackson, a builder, did not want shop fittings but had a friend who did. He found the fittings stored in the now slightly depressing vacant Fernleigh Castle. Jackson was taken with the castle and bought it from Buckingham. On the same day as he exchanged contracts, the Catholic Church decided to make an offer to buy it.

A 1951 Sunday Telegraph description of the castle noted it was set back in large grounds surrounded by a forest of trees and shrubs that effectively hid it from public view (from New South Head Road) in an "enchanting garden world of its own". 'Although it is set in a heavily populated residential area surrounded by other homes you can't see one neighbouring house. But you can look straight ahead across a breathtaking vista of Sydney Harbour'. It also noted the property had outbuildings such as the gardener's cottage (there were two permanent gardeners), chauffeurs' quarters and a workshop.

Jackson conducted the castle as a private hotel from 1954-1962 and worked on its restoration and modification. He sold part of the grounds including the tennis court, to raise funds. He built the swimming pool, the cottage suite at the rear of the main building and restored the garden on the remaining land. He bought sandstock bricks from William Wentworth's old home in Phillip Street, Sydney to make the sunken garden alcove. From historic St. Malo (Hunters Hill) and the old Stewart-Dawson home in Darling Point he bought bricks, fittings and shutters to give the right character and atmosphere to the cottage suite. The lamp post decorating the entrance came from the Bourke Street Presbyterian Church.

=== Subdivision as Fernleigh Gardens Estate ===
In 1955 Lot 4 of Fernleigh Gardens Estate was re-subdivided into 3 lots. Lot A became 4 Fernleigh Gardens. Lot B became 3A Fernleigh Gardens and Lot C became 20 Rawson Road. 20 Rawson Road, one of these subdivided lots, was a vacant lot in 1953, part of the larger Fernleigh house and estate. In 1956 Buckingham purchased 20 Rawson Road. He had a house built on this lot post-1956 which had some characteristics of mid-twentieth century suburban development and was a relatively substantial example in an affluent suburb, with simple and limited detailing.

In 1962 the Jacksons sold Fernleigh Castle to C. G. Lloyd and his wife who transferred it in 1963 to Franco-Swiss (Asia) P/L. In August 1964 Mark Richard Cotter and his wife bought it, and sold it in 1966 to the Commercial Banking Company of Sydney, who established it as a staff training college for its executives on 7 March 1966. The castle has been the host of distinguished guests over the years: English actors Laurence Olivier and Vivien Leigh, theatre identity Robert Helpmann, English writer Dame Edith Sitwell, the Ambassador of Spain. The "Shirley Bassey Lodge" beside the swimming pool was named after the world-famous singer who once stayed in this cottage in the castle's grounds.

A 1966 article noted that "the forest is not there now but some beautiful old trees still adorn the grounds. The isolation has gone, the chauffeur has gone and so has the second gardener."

== Description ==
The site comprises a Port Hacking or cedar fig (Ficus superba var. henneana). It is a magnificent and very old specimen, part of the original "Fernleigh Gardens" estate, the only known example of this species in the municipality.

Located in a position of great prominence on a sandstone outcrop on the western side of the ridge, overlooking Rose Bay. This is a position of visual significance, particularly from the harbour and the approach through Rose Bay along New South Head Road. This fig's stature and canopy is not large by the standard of other figs in the Municipality. However this is most likely the result of limiting factors such as shallow soils in this location and exposure to southerly winds.

The tree height is c. 16 – c. m and the spread is c. 36 – c. m east to west and c. 28 – c. m north-south. It is a multi-stemmed specimen with stems straddling the site and adjacent properties. The combined trunk diameter exceeds two metres (six feet seven inches). It is a young and healthy tree, considered against the maximum potential life expectancy for this genus. Based on the synconium being in pairs, the relatively-small size of fruit and presence of a drip tip (to the leaf) there is a reasonable likelihood that the earlier identification (of Ficus superba var.henneana) is now incorrect. Based on the features observed at the two inspections, it would appear that the tree is a white fig, Ficus virens, probably planted after the first (colonial) settlement in Queensland had established and more than likely some time in the latter half of the 1800s or very early 1900s.

This rare and magnificent specimen of Port Hacking fig (Ficus superba var. henneana). Estimated by the National Herbarium to be as old as the late 1820s, it is considered by fig expert Dr Wee Lek Choo (who is revising the genus "Ficus" for the "Flora of Australia") to be quite rare, and likely to be a natural remnant of the original vegetation of this area, given its location, age and size, and the species' dispersed distribution. It has attained an enormous spread, and its fruit provides fodder for many of Sydney's (now endangered) grey headed flying foxes (bats). It is highly unlikely to have been planted as this species is also very rare in cultivation. It certainly predates subdivision of the Fernleigh Gardens estate and the nearby houses.

The tree's root zone and canopy spread cover at least parts of the sections of 20 Rawson Road, 3-3A and 4 Fernleigh Gardens, with a radius of at least 9 metres (30 ft) in 1987. 5 Fernleigh Gardens site is approximately 50% covered by the tree's canopy and root zone.

=== Condition ===
As at 16 January 2004, some lopping in early 1980s of parts of the canopy due to adjacent development, in 1987–88 some damage to roots and stone wall around base of tree when installing swimming pool and plumbing at 4 Fernleigh Gardens.

=== Modifications and dates ===
- 1831 – 24-hectare (60-acre) estate
- 1874 – cottage built "The Ferns"
- 1881–1892 – cottage adapted and expanded into Fernleigh Castle, gatehouse/caretaker's cottage near gates to New South Head Road, substantial gardens including "forest of trees", lawns, and harbour views. Sandstone gate pillars and iron palisade fence to New South Head Road.

Subdivided on several occasions:

- 1919 – to create 13 residential lots around the boundary of the Fernleigh property;
- 1953 – to create the road Fernleigh Gardens and 11 separate lots. The Ficus superba was situated on Lot 4 DP 25379 in this subdivision.
- 1955 – Lot 4 (4 Fernleigh Gardens) was re-subdivided into 3 lots with the tree situated on Lot C (20 Rawson Road). Lot B became 3A Fernleigh Gardens, and Lot A became 4 Fernleigh Gardens.This configuration remains today other than a minor boundary adjustment in 1960 and the tree overhangs the properties of 3 and 3A Fernleigh Gardens.
- c. 1920 – 2.8-hectare (7-acre) remnant estate. Lessee Dame Nellie Melba cut down some of the trees to improve harbour views.
- 1951 – 2.4 hectares (6 acres) subdivided and sold, leaving Castle on 1 acre lot, still with substantial trees and gardens. Castle vacant and vandalised.
- 1954–66 – converted to private hotel, restoration work to castle and grounds/garden. Parts of the grounds were sold off including the tennis court. Swimming pool, cottage suite behind castle added.
- 1966– – run by Commercial Banking Company of Sydney as a staff training college.
- 7 May 1987 – Interim Conservation Order placed; subsequently expired on 14 May 1988.
- 9 July 1987 – HC approved a swimming pool & spa to be constructed at 4 Fernleigh Gardens, shallow end located near tree roots to minimise excavation.
- 17 April 1989 – HC approved extensions to existing house at 4 Fernleigh Gardens on the northern side boundary of the tree (and part of the SHR curtilage), extending the rear of this house to two storeys, reroofing and a new front verandah. Council's landscape architect advised that these works would not appear to compromise the tree's integrity. Condition placed on avoidance of impacts within root zone, and need for separate application for any canopy lopping.

== Heritage listing ==
As at 16 January 2004, this rare and magnificent specimen of Port Hacking fig (Ficus superba var. henneana) is of natural, scientific (botanical) and aesthetic heritage significance, and is one of the most important trees and notable in the Woollahra Municipality. Estimated by the National Herbarium to be as old as the late 1820s, it is considered by fig expert Dr Wee Lek Choo to be quite rare, and likely to be a natural remnant of the original vegetation of the Eastern Suburbs area, given its location, age and size, and the species' dispersed distribution. It has attained an enormous spread, and its fruit provides fodder for many of Sydney's (now endangered) grey headed flying foxes (bats). It is highly unlikely to have been planted as this species is also very rare in cultivation.

The tree is part of a remnant of the grounds of The Ferns, later Fernleigh Castle, an 1870s cottage, modified into a substantial 1880s sandstone mansion with originally 24 hectares (60 acres) of land, later subdivided to 2.4 hectares (6 acres) in the 1950s, and one acre lots in the 1960s. The castle with its substantial landscaped grounds was built by newspaper proprietor Frank Bennett, and had been host to a number of notable guests and visitors in his ownership, tenanted later by Dame Nellie Melba, and other notable guests in later periods when used as a private hotel and banking executive training school.

Site of Ficus superba var. henneana tree was listed on the New South Wales State Heritage Register on 2 April 1999.

== See also ==
- Bland Oak, a historical tree in Carramar, western Sydney
