= 1861 in Australian literature =

This article presents a list of the historical events and publications of Australian literature during 1861.

== Poetry ==
- Charles Harpur – "To My Infant Daughter "Ada""
- Basil E. Kendall – "Florence : A Song"
- Henry Kendall
  - "Fainting by the Way"
  - "The Rain Comes Sobbing to the Door"
  - "The Song of the Cattle Hunters"
  - "The Wail in the Native Oak"

== Births ==
A list, ordered by date of birth (and, if the date is either unspecified or repeated, ordered alphabetically by surname) of births in 1861 of Australian literary figures, authors of written works or literature-related individuals follows, including year of death.

- 12 January – Jack Moses, poet (died 1945)
- 20 February – Mary Gaunt, novelist (died 1942, in France)
- 11 May — William Dymock, bookseller (died 1900)
- 19 June – Ethel Castilla, journalist, poet and short story writer (died 1937)

== See also ==
- 1861 in Australia
- 1861 in literature
- 1861 in poetry
- List of years in literature
- List of years in Australian literature
