= The Last of His Tribe (poem) =

1864 poem by Henry Kendall

- by Henry Kendall
- Written: 1864
- First published in: The Sydney Morning Herald
- Country: Australia
- Language: English

Full text
- The Last of His Tribe at Wikisource

"The Last of His Tribe" is a poem by Australian writer Henry Kendall that was first published in The Sydney Morning Herald on 27 September 1864, under the title "Woonoona: The Last of His Tribe".

It was later included in the author's poetry collection Leaves from Australian Forests (1869), and was subsequently reprinted in various newspapers, magazines and poetry anthologies (see below).

== Reception ==
The Oxford Companion to Australian Literature states: "In it Kendall captures the attractive nature of Aboriginal life and sentimentally mourns its passing."

== Further publications ==
- Leaves from Australian Forests by Henry Kendall, George Robertson, 1869
- Poems of Henry Clarence Kendall, George Robertson, 1903
- The Golden Treasury of Australian Verse edited by Bertram Stevens, Angus and Robertson, 1909
- The Children's Treasury of Australian Verse edited by Bertram Stevens and George Mackaness, Angus and Robertson, 1913
- Selections from the Australian Poets edited by Bertram Stevens, Cornstalk Publishing, 1913
- Selected Poems of Henry Kendall edited by T. Inglis Moore, Angus and Robertson, 1957
- "The Bulletin", 11 December 1957
- Favourite Australian Poems edited by Ian Mudie, Rigby, 1963
- From the Ballads to Brennan edited by T. Inglis Moore, Angus & Robertson, 1964
- The Poetical Works of Henry Kendall edited by Thomas Thornton Reed, 1966
- Silence Into Song : An Anthology of Australian Verse edited by Clifford O'Brien, Rigby, 1968
- The Penguin Book of Australian Verse edited by Harry Heseltine, Penguin Books, 1972
- The Collins Book of Australian Poetry edited by Rodney Hall, Collins, 1981
- The Illustrated Treasury of Australian Verse edited by Beatrice Davis, Nelson, 1984
- Cross-Country : A Book of Australian Verse edited by John Barnes and Brian MacFarlane, Heinemann, 1984
- Two Centuries of Australian Poetry edited by Mark O’Connor, Oxford University Press, 1988
- The Macmillan Anthology of Australian Literature edited by Ken L. Goodwin and Alan Lawson, Macmillan, 1990
- A Treasury of Bush Verse edited by G. A. Wilkes, Angus and Robertson, 1991
- Henry Kendall: Poetry, Prose and Selected Correspondence edited by Michael Ackland, University of Queensland Press, 1993
- An Anthology of Australian Literature edited by Ch'oe Chin-yong and Dynthia Van Den Driesen, Hansin Munhwasa, 1995
- Classic Australian Verse edited by Maggie Pinkney, Five Mile Press, 2001
- Our Country : Classic Australian Poetry : From Colonial Ballads to Paterson & Lawson edited by Michael Cook, Little Hills Press, 2004
- Two Centuries of Australian Poetry edited by Kathrine Bell, Gary Allen, 2007
- An Anthology of Australian Poetry to 1920 edited by John Kinsella, University of Western Australia Library, 2007
- 60 Classic Australian Poems for Children edited by Chris Cheng, Random House, 2009

== See also ==
- 1864 in poetry
- List of years in Australian literature
- Australian literature
