= Poems and Songs =

Poetry collection by Henry Kendall

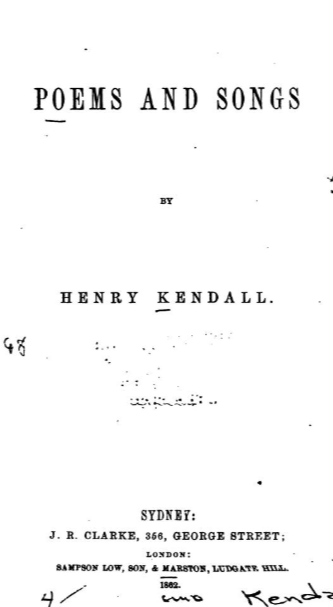
- Title page for Poems and Songs (1862)
- Author: Henry Kendall
- Language: English
- Publisher: J.R. Clarke
- Publication date: 1862
- Publication place: Australia
- Media type: Print (hardback & paperback)
- Pages: 144
- Followed by: Leaves from Australian Forests

Poems and Songs (1862) is the first collection of poems by Australian poet Henry Kendall. It was released in hardback by J.R. Clarke in 1862, and features the poet's widely anthologised poems "Song of the Cattle Hunters", and "The Muse of Australia".

The collection includes 45 poems by the author that are reprinted from various sources.

== Contents ==
- "The Muse of Australia"
- "Mountains"
- "Kiama"
- "Etheline"
- "Aileen"
- "Kooroora"
- "Fainting by the Way"
- "The Song of the Cattle Hunters"
- "Footfalls"
- "God Help Our Men at Sea"
- "Sitting by the Fire"
- "Bellambi's Maid"
- "The Curlew Song"
- "The Ballad of Tanna"
- "The Rain Comes Sobbing to the Door"
- "Urara"
- "Evening Hymn"
- "Stanzas"
- "The Wail in the Native Oak"
- "Harps We Love"
- "Waiting and Wishing"
- "The Wild Kangaroo"
- "Clari"
- "Wollongong"
- "Ella with the Shining Hair"
- "The Barcoo"
- "Bells Beyond the Forest"
- "Ulmarra"
- "The Maid of Gerringong"
- "Watching"
- "The Opossum-Hunters"
- "In the Depths of a Forest"
- "To Charles Harpur"
- "The River and the Hill"
- "The Fate of the Explorers"
- "Lurline"
- "Under the Figtree"
- "Drowned at Sea"
- "Morning in the Bush"
- "The Girl I Left Behind Me"
- "Amongst the Roses"
- "Sunset"
- "Doubting"
- "Geraldine"
- "Achan"

== Critical reception ==
Shortly after its original publication The Freeman's Journal opined "Here is music and delicate imagery, transporting our fancy, and enabling us in a moment — at a glance — to enter into the innermost heart of the poet's meaning."

G. B. Barton, writing in Literature in New South Wales (1866) was effusive in his praise when he wrote "This volume represents the highest point to which the poetic genius of our country has yet attained...The author paints the scenery of his native land with the hand of a master."

In the late 1960s, Adrian Mitchell wrote "..Kendall's first volume (Poems and Songs, 1862) is characterized by poems of regret and remembered parting of lovers, of nostalgia and of separation across the sea—or as a more melodramatic variation, a separation across the grave. These are conventional poems on conventional themes relying heavily on poetic cliché."

In 1994 The Oxford Companion to Australian Literature stated: "Many of these early Kendall poems attempt, however imperfectly, to reflect the spirit and character of Australian life to picture the beauty of the Australian coastal landscape."

== See also ==
- 1862 in Australian literature
- 1862 in poetry
