= 1855 in Australian literature =

This article presents a list of the historical events and publications of Australian literature during 1855.

== Events ==
- The first issue of Melbourne Punch is published on 2 August. The magazine would run until December 1925.

== Books ==
- Elizabeth Patricia Ramsay – A Romance of the Bush

== Poetry ==
- Charles Harpur
  - "The Anchor"
  - "Love Dreaming of Death"

== Non-fiction ==
- Raffaello Carboni — The Eureka Stockade

== Births ==
A list, ordered by date of birth (and, if the date is either unspecified or repeated, ordered alphabetically by surname) of births in 1855 of Australian literary figures, authors of written works or literature-related individuals follows, including year of death.

- June (exact date unknown) — Ned Kelly, bushranger and writer (died 1880)
- 18 June — George Louis Becke, author and short story writer (died 1913)
- 13 August – Price Warung, short story writer (died 1911)

== See also ==
- 1855 in poetry
- 1855 in literature
- List of years in literature
- List of years in Australian literature
