= The Rain Comes Sobbing to the Door =

1861 poem by Australian poet Henry Kendall

- by Henry Kendall
- First published in: The Sydney Morning Herald
- Country: Australia
- Language: English
- Publication date: 23 August 1861
- Lines: 32

Full text
- The Rain Comes Sobbing to the Door at Wikisource

"The Rain Comes Sobbing to the Door" (1861) is a poem by Australian poet Henry Kendall.

It was originally published in The Sydney Morning Herald on 23 August 1861 and was subsequently reprinted in the author's single-author collections and a number of Australian poetry anthologies.

== Synopsis ==
The poet and his companions are sitting in a house while the rain comes down outside. They toast to lost loved ones, and "the shades of other years."

== Critical reception ==
In his chapter titled "Kendall's Sublime Melancholy", in Henry Kendall : The Muse of Australia edited by Russell McDougall, Peter Otto notes that "Kendall's poetry employs melancholy as an interpretative mood which ensures that the Australian landscape speaks the language of loss, division and separation." He then continues by statingvof this poem: "Although at first glance slight and sentimental, this poem outlines the denial constitutive of melancholy with such clarity that the poem verges on self-critique."

== Publication history ==
After the poem's initial publication in The Sydney Morning Herald in 1861 it was reprinted as follows:

- Poems and Songs by Henry Kendall, J. R. Clarke, 1982
- Poems of Henry Kendall by Henry Kendall, George Robertson, 1886
- A Century of Australian Song edited by Douglas Sladen, Walter Scott Publishers, 1888
- The Poetical Works of Henry Kendall edited by Thomas Thornton Reed, 1966
- A Treasury of Colonial Poetry, Currawong, 1982

== See also ==
- 1861 in Australian literature
- 1861 in poetry
