= A Death in the Bush =

Poem by Henry Kendal

- by Henry Kendall
- Written: 1868
- First published in: Williams's Illustrated Australian Annual
- Country: Australia
- Language: English
- Publication date: Christmas, 1868
- Preceded by: "In the Valley"
- Followed by: "Syrinx"

Full text
- A Death in the Bush at Wikisource

"A Death in the Bush" (1868) is a long narrative poem by Australian poet Henry Kendall. It was originally published in the 1868 edition of Williams's Illustrated Australian Annual, and later appeared in the author's collection Leaves from Australian Forests (1869).

== Outline ==
The poem is another of Kendall's poems about melancholy aspects of Australian bush life. The poem describes the lonely death of a shepherd in the bush, alone except for his patient wife. After word of the man's death spreads people start arriving "to see their neighbour and to bury him."

== Reviews ==
When reviewing Leaves from Australian Forests in The Weekly Times a writer noted that "Mr. Kendall has a few more ambitious efforts, mostly in blank verse; but, although his verse is good, it is too redolent of Tennyson, and we cannot place these pieces on a level with his true and very welcome Australian lyrics. We must except, however, "A death in the bush," which has some true and pathetic touches."

Commenting on Henry Kendall's poetry and the crisis of faith in the mid-1880s Michael Ackland stated: "“A Death in the Bush”, like “The Glen of Arawatta”, tries to defend the salving notion of surviving “Love in Death”. Here again, however, the dramatization of grounds for doubt is imaginatively more persuasive than the concluding plea for faith maintained in a far away order. The wasted settler, brought to the verge of death by disease, exclaims feverishly “Where is God? — it is bitter cold”. But no supernatural help is forthcoming for him or his widow, who is left without “The faintest token of Divinity / In this my latest sorrow”.

== Further publications ==
- Selected Poems of Henry Kendall edited by T. Inglis Moore (1957)
- The Poetical Works of Henry Kendall edited by Thomas Thornton Reed (1966)
- Selected Poems of Henry Kendall edited by T. Inglis Moore (1988)
- The Penguin Book of 19th Century Australian Literature edited by Michael Ackland (1993)
- Henry Kendall : Poetry, Prose and Selected Correspondence edited by Michael Ackland (1993)
- Australian Verse : An Oxford Anthology edited by John Leonard (1998)
- An Anthology of Australian Poetry to 1920 edited by John Kinsella (2007)
- The Puncher & Wattmann Anthology of Australian Poetry edited by John Leonard (2009)

== See also ==
- 1868 in poetry
- 1868 in Australian literature
