= Leaves from Australian Forests =

Collected poems by Henry Kendall

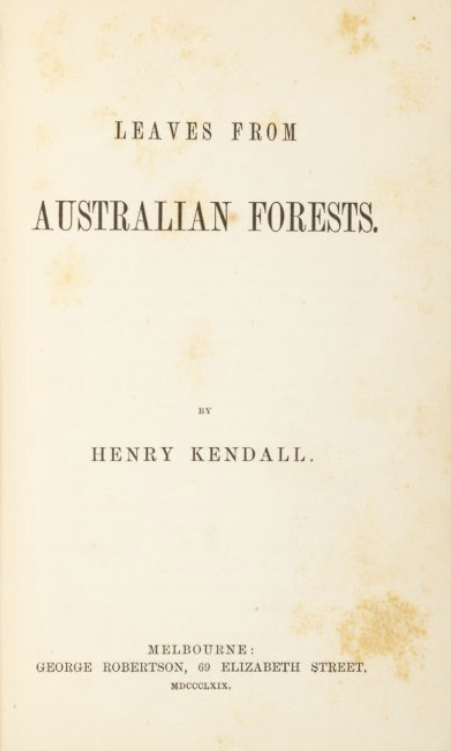
- Title page for Leaves from Australian Forests (1869)
- Author: Henry Kendall
- Language: English
- Genre: Poetry
- Publisher: George Robertson
- Publication date: 1869
- Publication place: Australia
- Media type: Print (hardback & paperback)
- Pages: 163
- Preceded by: Poems and Songs
- Followed by: Songs from the Mountains

Leaves from Australian Forests (1869) is the second collection of poems by Australian poet Henry Kendall. Published in hardback by George Robertson in 1869 and features the poet's widely anthologized poems "Bell-Birds", "The Hut by the Black Swamp", and "The Last of His Tribe". Additionally, it contains the poet's works dedicated to the memories of fellow writer Charles Harpur Daniel Henry Deniehy.

The collection includes 60 poems by the author that are reprinted from various sources.

== Contents ==
- "Dedication"
- "Prefatory Sonnets: I"
- "Prefatory Sonnets: II"
- "The Hut by the Black Swamp"
- "September in Australia"
- "Ghost Glen"
- "Daphne"
- "The Warrigal"
- "Euroclydon"
- "Araluen"
- "At Euroma"
- "Illa Creek"
- "Moss on a Wall"
- "Campaspe"
- "On a Cattle Track"
- "To Damascus"
- "Bell-Birds"
- "A Death in the Bush"
- "A Spanish Love Song"
- "The Last of His Tribe"
- "Arakoon"
- "The Voyage of Telegonus"
- "Sitting by the Fire"
- "Cleone"
- "Charles Harpur"
- "Coogee"
- "Ogyges"
- "By the Sea"
- "The Song of the Cattle Hunters"
- "King Saul at Gilboa"
- "In the Valley"
- Twelve Sonnets —
  - "A Mountain Spring"
  - "Laura"
  - "By a River"
  - "Attila"
  - "A Reward"
  - "To ----"
  - "The Stanza of Childe Harold"
  - "A Living Poet"
  - "Dante and Virgil"
  - "Rest"
  - "After Parting"
  - "Alfred Tennyson"
- "Sutherland's Grave"
- "Syrinx"
- "On the Paroo"
- "Faith in God"
- "Mountain Moss"
- "The Glen of Arrawatta" (aka "The Glen of the White Man's Grave")
- "Euterpe"
- "Ellen Ray"
- "At Dusk"
- "Safi"
- "Daniel Henry Deniehy"
- "Merope"
- "After the Hunt"
- "Rose Lorraine"

== Critical reception ==
On its original publication in Australia The Australasian stated that "...it is apparent that Kendall is as essentially Australian as Burns is Scotch or Bryant American. His soul has been nurtured amid the silent solemnity of the Australian bush, and his sweetest utterances are framed in giving voice to its solitudes."

== See also ==
- 1869 in Australian literature
- 1869 in literature
- 1869 in poetry
