= John S. Jacobs =

Black abolitionist (1815 or 1817–1873)

- 1848 portrait by Joseph Whiting Stock, possibly depicting John S. Jacobs
- Born: 1815; Edenton, North Carolina, U.S.
- Died: December 19, 1873 (aged 57–58); Cambridge, Massachusetts, U.S.
- Resting place: Mount Auburn Cemetery
- Occupations: Author and abolitionist
- Relatives: Harriet Jacobs (sister); Louisa Matilda Jacobs (niece); William Jacob Knox Jr. (grandnephew); Lawrence H. Knox (grandnephew); Clinton E. Knox (grandnephew)
- Writing career
- Genre: Slave narrative
- Notable work: The United States Governed by Six Hundred Thousand Despots (1855)

John Swanson Jacobs (1815 or 1817 (Note: Enslaved persons seldom knew their own birthdates. Since John was two years younger than his sister Harriet, the calculation of his birthdate depends on hers. Her biographer Yellin gives 1813 as the year of Harriet's birth, without detailing day, month or season. Her tombstone, however, gives February 11, 1815 as the date of her birth (John's tombstone has no dates). Mary Maillard, who would in 2017 become the editor of the letters of Harriet's daughter, argues in favor of 1815 as the year of Harriet's birth in an article published in 2013. John's biographer Schroeder follows Yellin, noting that John's death certificate has February 9, 1818 as his birthdate. The dates and ages in this article are given according to Schroeder and Yellin.) – December 19, 1873) was a Black (Note: His editor and biographer Schroeder calls him "an ex-American, a Black citizen of the world".) author and abolitionist. After escaping from slavery in North Carolina, he became prominent in abolitionist circles of the northeastern United States. He was closely connected with the authors of the two slave narratives read most widely today, his sister Harriet Jacobs and his friend and ally Frederick Douglass. Following the passage of the 1850 Fugitive Slave Law, he left the United States and published his autobiography, The United States Governed by Six Hundred Thousand Despots, in a Sydney, Australia newspaper in 1855. After being republished in 2024, it was described as unique among slave narratives "for its global perspective and its uncensored fury".

== Life ==
=== Ancestry ===
The enslaved ancestors of John S. Jacobs can be traced back to his great-great-great-grandparents Tenea and Primus who fell victims to the Atlantic slave trade and were transported to North Carolina in the 1720s or early 1730s. In 1792, Maria Knox, the daughter of Tenea's and Primus's daughter Lucy, "pulled off one of the largest and most daring escapes on record" together with Jack Cotton, the father of her children. Their eldest child, Athena, was fifteen years old by then. From New Bedford, Cotton went on a whaling journey. His fate is unknown. Maria and three of her children including Athena were returned to slavery after nearly six years. At the turn of the century, Athena and her young son Elijah lived on a plantation in Pasquotank County, North Carolina. Tom Copper who would organize "the largest slave rebellion in North Carolina history" in 1802, lived on the same plantation. Jacobs's editor and biographer Jonathan Schroeder draws a connection between the experience of the rebellion and Elijahs hatred for slavery which he would bequeath to his son John S. Jacobs.

According to Jacobs's sister Harriet, Elijah's father was a White "gentleman" called Jacobs. Being a slave, Elijah was not allowed to use his father's surname, but was known by his enslaver's surname as Elijah Knox. Harriet and John would use the name that their father had been denied. Apart from his surname, nothing else is known about Elijah's father. (Note: According to Schroeder. Yellin thinks, he was a poor and illiterate farmer living in the neighborhood of the plantation in Pasquotank County during the 1780s. Schroeder says about this theory, "Yellin discarded the theory that the Jacobs's name came from a maternal [sic] grandfather and poor White farmer named Daniel [sic] Jacobs." Additionally, Schroeder thinks that Elijah was born around 1798.)

The maternal grandmother, Molly, had been freed by her enslaver who also was her father while still a child. But during the American Revolutionary War, she was kidnapped and sold to John Horniblow, a tavern keeper in Edenton. Later, the tavern keeper's widow gave Molly's daughter Delilah to her own infirm daughter.

=== Enslaved youth ===
John Jacobs was born in Edenton, North Carolina, in 1815 or 1817 to Delilah Horniblow and Elijah Knox. His father, although enslaved, was in some ways privileged because he was an expert carpenter. According to the legal principle partus sequitur ventrem ("birth follows womb"), the status of the mother as free or enslaved determined the status of the child. Therefore John and his sister Harriet, who was two years his senior, were considered slaves of the tavern keeper's daughter.

John's mother died when he was four years old. His father entered a new relationship with Theresa, a free Black woman. Their only child, Elijah Knox Jr., would "start one of the most distinguished and educated Black families of the twentieth century; his descendants are the closest relations of John and Harriet alive today." (Note: The grandson of Elijah Knox Jr., William Jacob Knox Jr., was among the few African Americans involved with the Manhattan Project.) Soon afterwards, a new owner revoked the privileges of John's father and ordered him to his plantation, so that he was rarely able to see his family. He died in 1826 at the age of about 28. For John, his early death was caused by the "galling chain" of slavery. Following the death of the tavern keeper's daughter, John was inherited by her old mother, while his sister was willed to the 3-year-old daughter of Dr. James Norcom, the deceased tavern keeper's son-in-law. At nine years old, John was hired out to Dr. Norcom, in whose house the siblings would be living together for the rest of their youth.

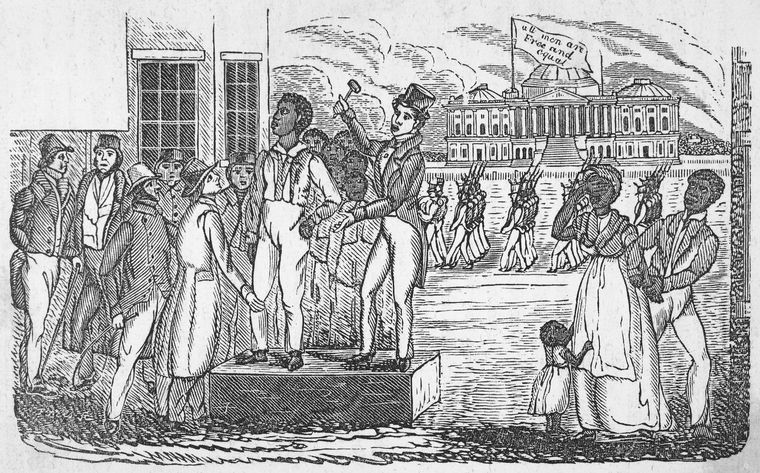
Slave auction (Note: The picture is used in an article on the discovery of the Sydney edition of Jacobs's narrative.)

After the death of Horniblow's widow, her slaves were sold at New Year's Day auction 1828, among them John, his grandmother Molly and Molly's son Mark. Being sold at public auction was a traumatic experience for 12-year-old John. He was bought by Dr. Norcom and continued living in his house. Following the auction, grandmother Molly was able to buy her own freedom as well as uncle Mark's, using money that she had earned through years of extra work and entrusted to friends.

While enslaved by Norcom, John Jacobs succeeded in teaching himself to read (only very few slaves were literate), but even when he escaped from slavery as a young adult he was not able to write.

Norcom used morphine, demanded absolute obedience from his children as well as from his slaves, and had many children with enslaved women. (Note: According to Harriet, their number was eleven.) Soon Norcom started to harass John's sister Harriet sexually. Hoping to escape his constant harassment, she started a relationship with Samuel Sawyer, a White lawyer, who would later be elected to the House of Representatives. They had two children together.

In June 1835, Harriet's situation as Norcom's slave had become unbearable and she decided to escape. For seven years, she hid herself in a "coffin-shaped" garret under grandmother Molly's roof, where the lack of physical activity and the cold during the winters were slowly crippling her body. Furious, Norcom threw John Jacobs together with Harriet's two children into jail and then sold them to a slave trader, hoping he would transport them outside the state, thus separating them forever from their mother and sister. But the trader had been secretly in league with Sawyer to whom he sold all three of them.

Jacobs had to follow his new enslaver to Washington, D.C. He was employed as Sawyer's personal servant and got insights into the life of the country's political elite. According to Jacobs, the congressmen preferred playing poker over going to the House and take part in the voting procedures. He gives short acid characterizations of president Martin van Buren ("bloodhound importer") (Note: In 1840, van Buren had endorsed using Cuban bloodhounds to hunt down fleeing Seminoles during the Second Seminole War.) and famous senator Henry Clay ("great polka [poker] (Note: Schroeder's explanation) player"). Only former president John Quincy Adams gets a positive remark ("attending to his business").

In 1838, John accompanied Sawyer on his honeymoon trip through the North and got his freedom by simply leaving Sawyer in New York, where slavery had been abolished. He had a friend write a note for Sawyer:

"Sir — I have left you not to return; when I have got settled I will give you further satisfaction. No longer yours, John S Jacob [sic]."

Jacobs was "scrupulous about taking any money from his master on false pretences; so he sold his best clothes to pay for his passage", but he writes that he took two pistols from Sawyer for self-defence. After unsuccessfully trying to work for his living by day and to attend school at night, in August 1839 (Note: Based on the information given by Jacobs in True Tale, Yellin has been able to establish the exact dates of the journey: "The whaler Frances Henrietta weighed anchor at New Bedford on August 4, 1839, and returned on February 16, 1843".) he went on a whaling voyage, starting from New Bedford like his great-grandfather Jack Cotton had done, taking with him all the books he wanted to study in order to make up for the education he had been denied in his youth.

=== Anti-slavery activism ===
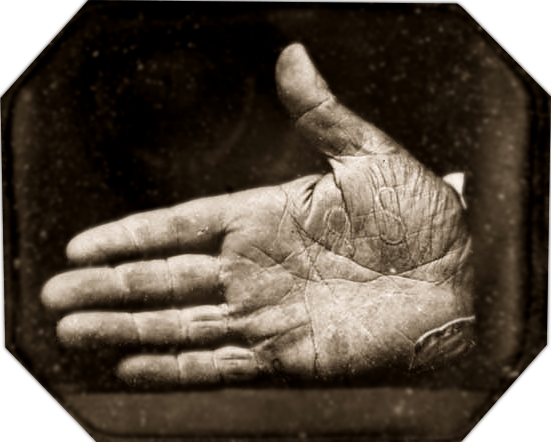
1845 daguerreotype of Walker's branded hand by photographers Southworth & Hawes.

After returning after three and a half years, John S. Jacobs, as he called himself after his escape to freedom, (Note: Yellin interpretes the "S." as a compliment to his last owner, Sam Sawyer. John S. Jacobs himself writes about his relationship to Sawyer, "The lawyer [Sawyer] I have quite a friendly feeling for, and would be pleased to meet him as a countryman and a brother, but not as a master.") settled in Boston, Massachusetts. Slavery had long been abolished in Massachusetts, and anti-slavery sentiment was strong in Boston, where William Lloyd Garrison published his Liberator. Still, Black refugees from the South could be transported back to slavery, and their helpers, like Charles Turner Torrey, sometimes faced long terms of imprisonment. Jacobs soon became an active member of the city's vibrant African-American community, which numbered about 2,000. He joined the African-American Adelphic Union Library Association which organized lectures on various subjects including oratory, promoting the idea of self-improvement. Soon, he would also take part in the activities of the New England Freedom Association, helping fugitives from the slave states. William Cooper Nell, the "glue that held Black Boston together", soon called Jacobs his "adopted Brother".

By 1847, Jacobs had established his fame as an able and committed abolitionist. Garrison's American Anti-Slavery Society invited him to join captain Jonathan Walker on a four-and-a-half-month lecturing tour. Walker, a White man, showed his hand as proof of the slaveholders' barbaric brutality. The hand had been branded with the letters SS (meaning "slave stealer") after he had tried to assist a group of fugitives.

After that, Jacobs undertook other lecture tours for the abolitionist cause on his own. Early in 1849, he went on a 16-day tour together with Frederick Douglass, who had made his escape from slavery in 1838 only weeks before Jacobs had made his. (Note: Yellin gives the date of Jacobs's escape as "Late autumn".)

From December 1847 through the autumn of 1849, Jacobs spent at least 450 days on the lecturing circuit, travelling mostly on foot in all kinds of weather. As can be seen from his reports printed in Douglass’s North Star and Garrison’s Liberator, he found an interested and kind audience in some places, but was harressed or even threatened in others. The reception was especially negative in places where president Zachary Taylor, an enslaver of 131 persons, had strong support.

For a short period in 1849, Jacobs, with the help of his sister Harriet, took over the management of the "Anti-Slavery Office and Reading Room" in Rochester, New York, which was situated in the same building as Douglass's newspaper North Star.

=== Fugitive Slave Law and exile ===
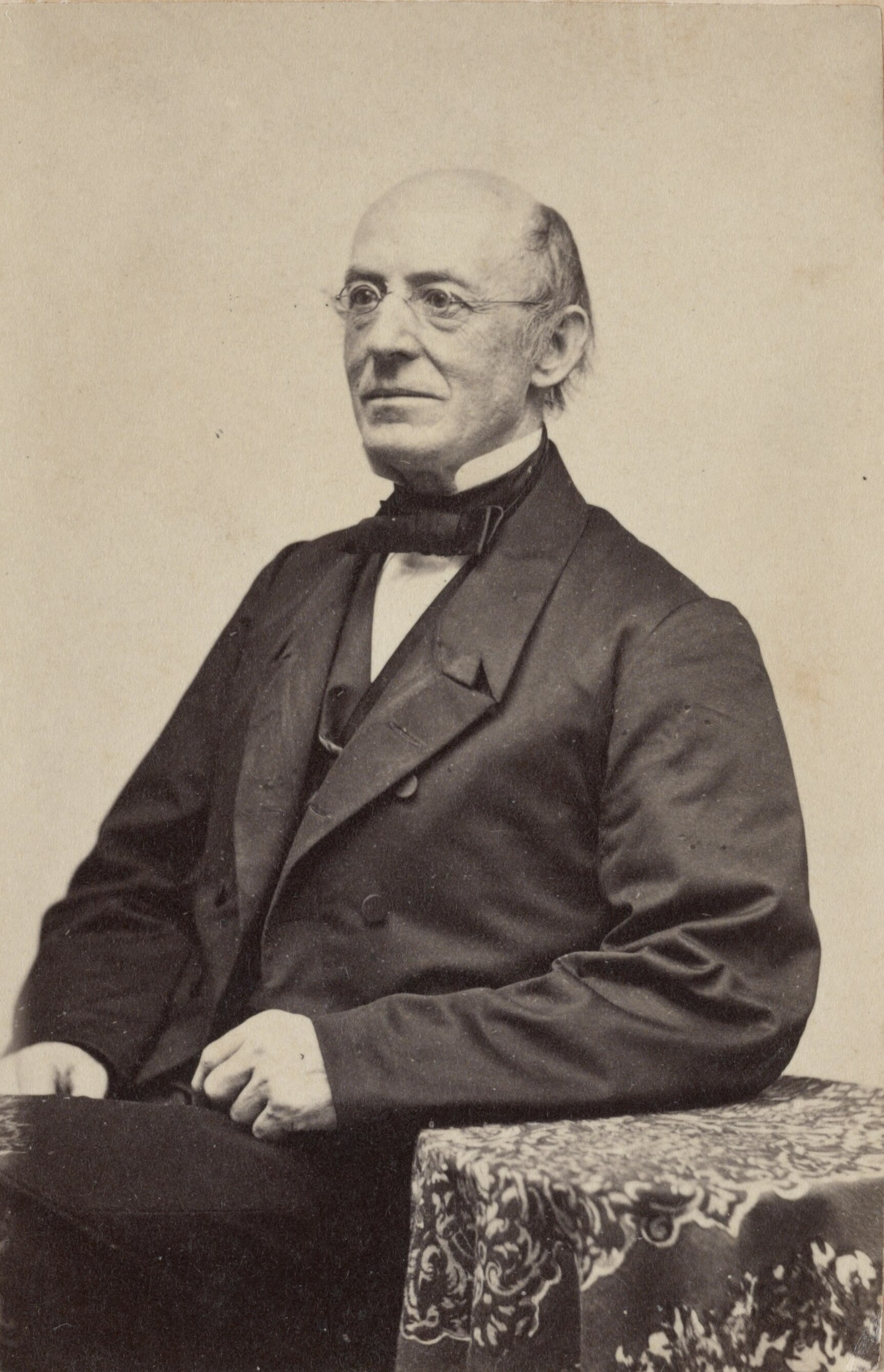
William Lloyd Garrison

In the autumn of 1849, Jacobs stopped lecturing. Schroeder sees a connection to the enormous physical and psychological stress involved. In 1850, Congress passed the Fugitive Slave Law which made it easier for slaveholders to force fugitives back into slavery. John S. Jacobs was one of the speakers on rallies protesting against that law. At the end of that year, he went to California to try his luck as a gold miner. At the end of 1852, he went on to Australia together with Harriet's son Joseph, again searching for gold. (Note: According to Schroeder, the two "packed their bags" at the end of 1852 and arrived in Australia in the spring of 1853.) According to Schroeder, going to California and then Australia was the only way to be true to the Garrisonian principle of "No Union with Slaveholders" which was incompatible with paying money to the former enslaver for getting the freedom papers. (Note: According to his sister, the siblings' farewell talk was totally dominated by the Fugitive Slave Law. On the other hand, she explicitly states that the law did not apply to John S., because he did not come to the free states as a fugitive, but was brought there by his master. John S. himself mentions his fear of being "kidnapped". Harriet's freedom papers would be bought a few years later without her knowledge by her employer Cornelia Willis, the wife of Nathaniel Parker Willis, and her autobiography mentions the ambiguous feelings caused by that action: "A human being sold in the free city of New York!" (emphasis by H.Jacobs) Douglass agreed to two Scottish abolitionists buying his freedom and moved away from Garrisonian principles.)

After spending about three years in Australia, he went on to England, where he arrived in August 1857, and started to work as a cook or steward "on ships carrying sugar from the Caribbean, oranges from the Black Sea, cotton from Egypt. He also helped finish the trans-Atlantic telegraph line and, in 1869, sailed to Bangkok on a gunboat delivered as a present for the new king of Siam. On average, he spent about ten months at sea and two in London." He always kept in touch with his sister via mail, but much of their correspondence has been lost. He stayed in contact with the abolitionist networks, informing his friends on things he saw on his long voyages. His wide horizon is demonstrated by a letter of his protesting against the coolie trade which reduced its Chinese victims to near-slavery.

=== Autobiography ===
==== Publication history ====
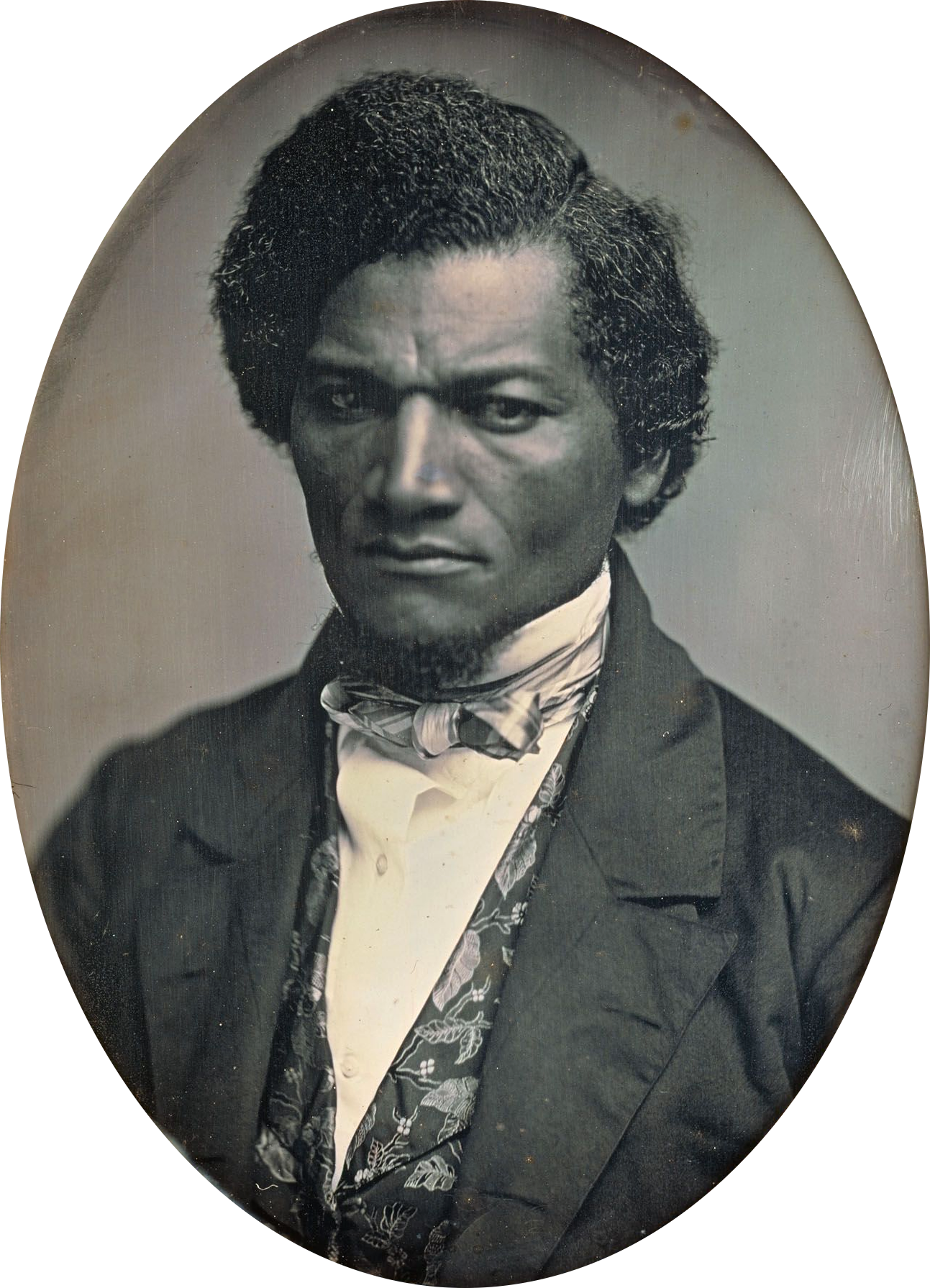
Frederick Douglass (picture taken between 1847 and 1852)

The idea to write down their experiences as slaves cannot have been new to the Jacobs siblings. As early as 1845 Frederick Douglass had written A Narrative of the Life of Frederick Douglass, an American Slave. Jacobs himself was the one to urge his sister to write down her story. Abolitionist and feminist Amy Post whom Harriet Jacobs had come to know through John, finally was the person to convince Harriet, who in 1853 started working on her Incidents in the Life of a Slave Girl, published in January 1861.

In 1855, John S. Jacobs contacted the Sydney daily The Empire. Some weeks later, in April, his autobiography appeared in two editions of the newspaper. It consists of 20,000 words, filling 69 pages (including notes) in Schroeder's 2024 edition, telling the story of his life from his birth to his departure for California. In the last scene, Cornelia Willis, his sister's employer, promises to protect her from the slave-catchers, assuring Jacobs that she would "have nerve enough" to shoot at them, if necessary. The final three chapters depart from the conventions of slave narratives and from Jacobs’s life story to offer a critique of the Constitution of the United States, the Declaration of Independence, and the Fugitive Slave Act.

When John Jacobs met his sister in England in 1858, he tried in vain to help her find a publisher for her story. Only in November 1860 he got to know that Harriet had finally found a publisher in the United States and so arranged for a new edition of his own text in the London weekly The Leisure Hour. It appeared in the four February editions of 1861, while Jacobs was again at sea. In his absence, the newspaper's editors had "bowdlerized, ... tamed, sanitized, and retitled [it] to A True Tale of Slavery", cut it down to about half the original size, and left out the last three chapters.

Jacobs's sister Harriet and his friend and ally Frederick Douglass authored the most widely read and most important slave narratives. While Douglass's narrative was the only slave narrative never to be out of print, the narratives of the Jacobs siblings were largely forgotten for more than a century. Harriet Jacobs's Incidents had some impact in the years during and after the Civil War and was republished during the Civil Rights Movement in the 1960s, but was largely considered a work of fiction. It was only through the efforts of Jean Fagan Yellin that the persons, places and facts mentioned by Harriet could be identified and corroborated. Incidents was republished by Yellin in 1987 and is now "recognized as a cornerstone of 19th-century American literature". The bowdlerized London edition of John's narrative remained obscure until 2000, when Yellin republished it as an appendix to the revised edition of his sister's book. The Sydney edition remained in obscurity, until found by historian Jonathan D. S. Schroeder and published together with a biography on John S. Jacobs in 2024.

==== Refusing White expectations ====
Jacobs's narrative is the only slave narrative known so far that comes in two editions—the Sydney one nearly untouched by White editors and the London one heavily changed. Comparing these editions helps us to understand what other narratives would have looked like without the changes applied by White editors, most significantly his sister's narrative, which was changed by Lydia Maria Child's "heavy hand", replacing Harriet's final chapter about the abolitionist martyr John Brown with one on grandmother Molly's death, among other changes.

Schroeder writes about the Sydney edition: "Despots strains against the conventions of the slave narrative genre, ultimately turning them inside out. Signally, the narrative refuses the sentimental objectification of Black life in favor of a go-for-broke denunciation of slavery and the state". The Sydney edition of Jacobs's story is unique among slave narratives because it was not edited, pruned and mollified by White abolitionists according to the tastes of a predominantly White audience and therefore kept "its uncensored fury". It is also unique for "its global perspective".

According to Schroeder, "White abolitionists placed sentimental humanitarian expectations on the genre" of slave narratives, thinking that depicting the sufferings of the slaves would help mobilize public opinion against slavery, but Jacobs avoids this kind of description which "puts the reader on a pedestal to look down on the suffering of people held in bondage." To illustrate his point, Schroeder compares Douglass's "infamously voyeuristic" description of the whipping of his aunt Hester with Jacobs's account of the whipping of a female slave called Agnes. Jacobs was called to dress her wounds and Agnes's lacerated back is the only part of her body he describes.

John Jacobs doesn't mention his sister's sexual history, keeping silent about Norcom's sexual harassment as well as Sawyer's relationship with his sister. Harriet's children seem to appear out of nothing the moment they are thrown into jail together with their uncle. According to Harriet's biographer Yellin, this means that "the unique center of her narrative is lost". Schroeder sees John Jacobs's silence as being in line with his avoidance of sentimental descriptions of suffering, supposing that John Jacobs didn't want to "expose his sister to that kind of gaze".

==== Analysis of American law ====
What Jacobs wants to draw attention to instead of the suffering, is the system that makes this suffering possible, the constitution and the laws of the United States. Jacobs follows Garrison's interpretation of the Constitution as a bulwark of slavery and a "covenant with death", whereas Douglass and his followers saw the Constitution as an ally on the way to abolition. The methods he applies are both changes to the text and combining different texts in a new way. For example, he inserts a passage from the Constitution (given in italics in the quotation below) into the famous paragraph of the Declaration. Additionally, he changes the word "person" (used by the Constitution to avoid the word "slave") to the very word "slave" which the Constitution wanted to avoid and adds the final words "excluding Indians [i.e. Native Americans] and free negroes":

We hold these truths to be self-evident:—That all men are created equal; that they are endowed by their Creator with certain unalienable rights; that among these are life, liberty and the pursuit of happiness. That no slave held to service or labour in one State, under the laws thereof, escaping into another, shall, in consequence of any law or regulation therein, be discharged from such service or labour, but shall be delivered up on claim of the party to whom such service or labour may be due. To secure these rights, governments are instituted among men, deriving their just powers from the consent of the governed, excluding Indians and free negroes.

==== Legacy ====
Other slave narratives not changed by Whites were written either by people awaiting execution or by clerics or by full-time activists. Jacobs's narrative is the only one written by a revolutionary Black sailor. Schroeder concludes: "[It] stands for the untold lives of millions of individuals who left their homes fleeing slavery, persecution, genocide, war, authoritarianism, and other catastrophes."

According to Schroeder, Jacobs's book "trains us not to succumb to political disappointment, but to challenge this nation's [America's] anti-democratic or authoritarian history."

=== Family and death ===
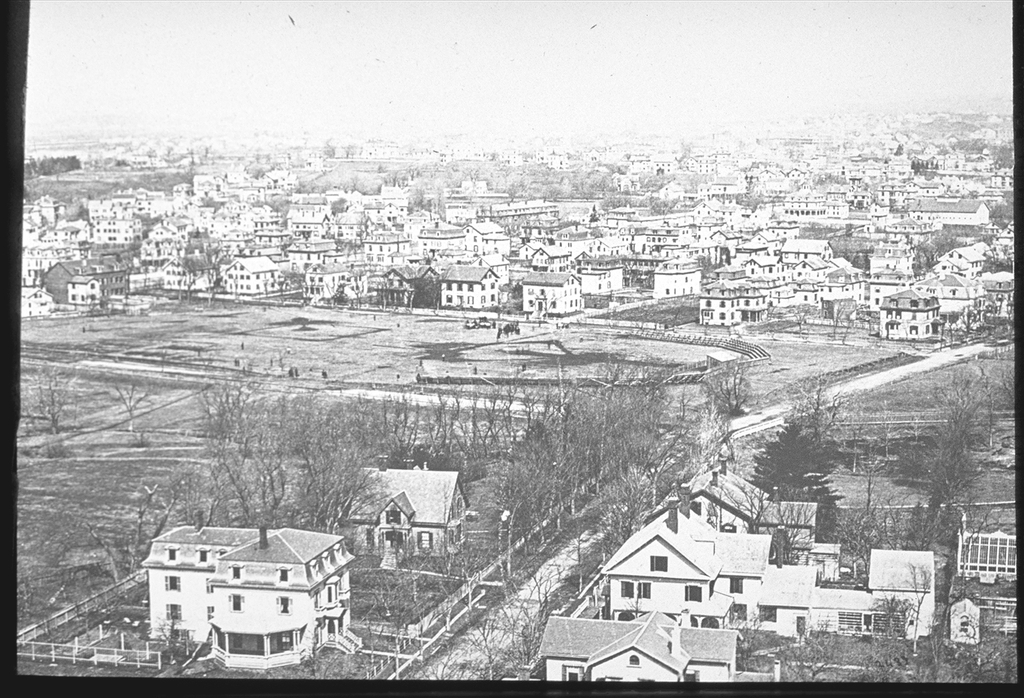
Cambridge, Massachusetts, 1875

In 1862, aged nearly 50, John S. Jacobs married Elleanor Ashland, a White Englishwoman who already had two children from a previous relationship. The marriage certificate is the only place where his middle name Swanson appears. Its origin remains unclear. The only child they had together, Joseph Ramsey Jacobs, was born in 1866. When his sister came to England for a second and last time in 1867/68, the siblings were able to meet for the third time since 1850. (Note: The second meeting having been in New York where John had come on one of his voyages.)

In 1873, Jacobs returned to the U.S. together with his wife and the three children to live in Cambridge, Massachusetts, close to his sister and her daughter Louisa Matilda. He died the same year, on December 19, 1873. Having been invited by Louisa Matilda, William Lloyd Garrison participated in the funeral. Harriet and Louisa Matilda Jacobs later were interred at his side in Mount Auburn Cemetery.

His widow stayed in the United States until her death in 1903, but it seems that there was little contact between Harriet Jacobs' family and hers. Harriet's biographer Jean Fagan Yellin supposes that Elleanor Jacobs severed the ties so that her children would not fall victims to American racism. Census data list Joseph Ramsey Jacobs as "White". He died in 1961 without issue.

== Notes and references ==
=== Bibliography ===
- Jacobs, Harriet (1861), Incidents in the Life of a Slave Girl. Written by Herself, Boston
- Jacobs, Harriet A. (2000), Yellin, Jean Fagan (ed.), Incidents in the Life of a Slave Girl: Written by Herself. Enlarged Edition. Edited and with an Introduction by Jean Fagan Yellin. Now with "A True Tale of Slavery" by John S. Jacobs, Cambridge: Harvard University Press, ISBN 978-0-6740-0271-5
- Jacobs, John Swanson (2024), Schroeder, Jonathan D. S. (ed.), The United States Governed by Six Hundred Thousand Despots: A True Story of Slavery, Chicago: University of Chicago Press, ISBN 978-0226-68430-7
  - "The United States Governed by Six Hundred Thousand Despots: A True Story of Slavery (Part 1)". Empire. Sydney, New South Wales. April 25, 1855. p. 2 – via Trove.
  - "The United States Governed by Six Hundred Thousand Despots: A True Story of Slavery (Part 2)". Empire. Sydney, New South Wales. April 26, 1855. p. 3 – via Trove.
- Jacobs, John S. (1861). "A True Tale of Slavery". The Leisure Hour. London.
- Maillard, Mary (ed.), Whispers of Cruel Wrongs: The Correspondence of Louisa Jacobs and Her Circle, 1879–1911
- Schroeder, Jonathan D. S. (2024), "No Longer Yours: The Lives of John Swanson Jacobs", The United States Governed by Six Hundred Thousand Despots: A True Story of Slavery, by Jacobs, John Swanson, Schroeder, Jonathan D. S. (ed.), Chicago: University of Chicago Press, pp. 74–187, ISBN 978-0226-68430-7
- Yellin, Jean Fagan (2004), Harriet Jacobs: A Life, New York: Basic Civitas Books, ISBN 0-465-09288-8
- Yellin, Jean Fagan; Thomas, Joseph M.; et al., eds. (2008), The Harriet Jacobs Family Papers, The University of North Carolina Press, ISBN 978-0-8078-3131-1
