= E. C. Buley =

Australian journalist and author

Ernest Charles Buley (1869–1933) was an Australian journalist and author.

His best selling book was entitled Glorious Deeds of Australasians in the Great War and went through many reprints. The first edition was printed in October 1915 and was in its third edition by December.

== Bibliography ==
- Australian Life in Town and Country, New York, 1905
- Glorious Deeds of Australasians in the Great War, Andrew Melrose, London, 1915
- A Child's History of ANZAC, Hodder and Staughton, London, 1916
