= The Evening News (Sydney) =

Australian newspaper 1867 to 1931

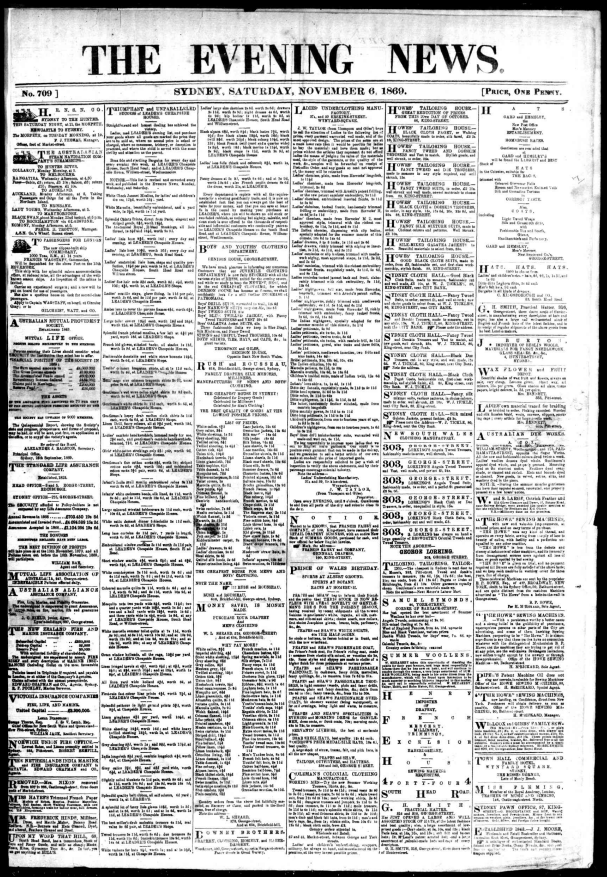
- The Evening News, 6 November 1869
- Type: Daily evening newspaper
- Format: Tabloid
- Founder: Samuel Bennett
- Publisher: Associated Newspapers
- Founded: 29 July 1867
- Ceased publication: 21 March 1931
- Language: English
- City: Sydney
- Country: Australia
- Sister newspapers: The Empire; Sunday News

The Evening News was the first evening newspaper published in Sydney, New South Wales, Australia. It was published from 29 July 1867 to 21 March 1931. The Sunday edition was published as the Sunday News.

== History ==
The Evening News was founded in 1867 by Samuel Bennett and was regarded as a "less serious read" than other Sydney newspapers. In 1875 labour difficulties forced Bennett to merge another of his papers, The Empire into The Evening News.

A. B. 'Banjo' Paterson was editor from 1903 to 1908, when he resigned.

In November 1918 the firm of S. Bennett Ltd, capital £200,000, was established to acquire the assets of the late Samuel Bennett, including the Evening News, Town and Country Journal, and Woman's Budget. Directors include K. L. Bennett. The Evening News continued to be published until 1931 at which point it was closed by Associated Newspapers Ltd, who had acquired most Sydney newspaper titles by that time. A Sunday morning edition was published as Sunday News from 1919 to 1930.

The Evening News office was located at 47 Market Street, Sydney in a grand four storey Victorian building in the heart of Sydney. In 1926 the building was sold to Union Theatres Limited for the construction of the new State Theatre that was to become the majestic centrepiece for the new technology 'talkie' films that commenced screening in 1929, signalling an end to the silent movie period.

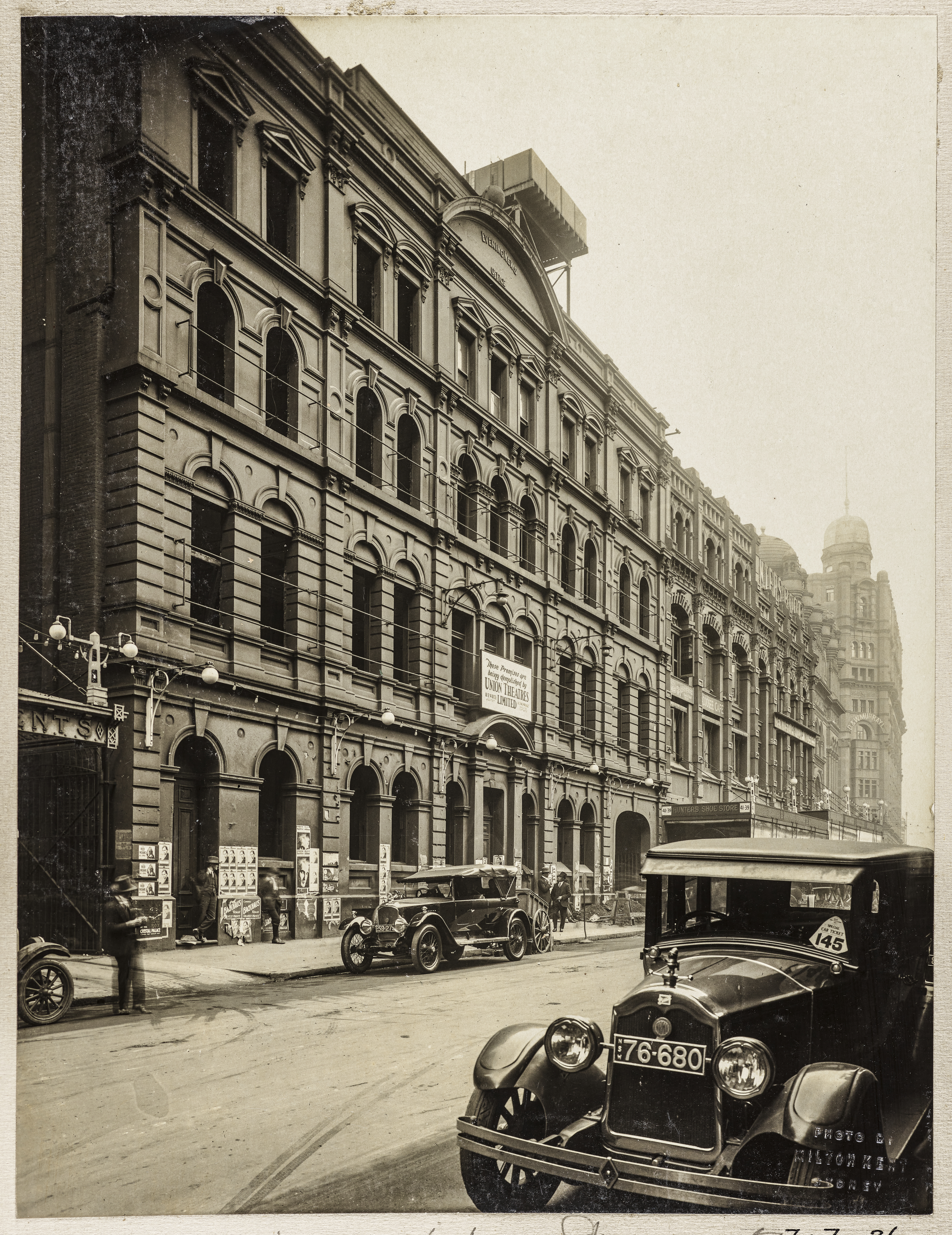
The Evening News building at 47 Market Street before being demolished. A sign on the building says "These Premises are being demolished by Union Theatres Limited, HE White, Architect, AJ Wainwright, Demolition Contractor" 7 July 1926, City of Sydney Archives

== Digitisation ==
The paper has been digitised as part of the Australian Newspapers Digitisation Program project of the National Library of Australia.

== See also ==
- List of newspapers in New South Wales
