= Samuel Bennett =

Australian colonial author and journalist (1815–1878)

Samuel Bennett (28 March 1815 – 2 June 1878) was a journalist, newspaper owner and historian in colonial Australia.

== Background ==
Bennett was born in Camborne, Cornwall, England. He migrated to Australia in 1841, having been engaged by Messrs. Stevens & Stokes of The Sydney Morning Herald to superintend the typographical department of that paper. Having held this post for seventeen years, in 1859 Bennett purchased The Empire newspaper which had been started by Henry Parkes nine years previously. Messrs. Hanson & Bennett conducted The Empire for several years as a daily and weekly journal, Bennett becoming sole proprietor some time before it ceased publication.

Bennett also started in 1867 The Evening News, and in 1870 The Australian Town and Country Journal, a weekly newspaper, both of which achieved phenomenal success, with circulations of 32,000 and 30,000 respectively in 1881. Bennett was the author of The History of Australian Discovery and Colonisation, which is recognised as a standard work of reference.

== Legacy ==
Bennett died of tetanus at his residence, Mundarrah Towers, Little Coogee, Sydney, New South Wales, on 2 June 1878. Bennett had married Eliza née Sellers of Bristol; they had seven children together. Bennett was survived by three sons (all three – Alfred b.1851, Frank b.1853 and Christopher b.1857 – joined their father and continued his newspaper business, his will providing for his eldest surviving son to be the managing proprietor, they succeeded each other in birth order) and a daughter, Rose, also a proprietor, who married John Henniker Heaton.

In November 1918 the firm of S. Bennett Ltd, capital £200,000, was established to acquire the assets of Samuel Bennett, including the Evening News, Town and Country Journal, and Woman's Budget. Directors include K. L. Bennett.
