= Australian Town and Country Journal =

Australian newspaper

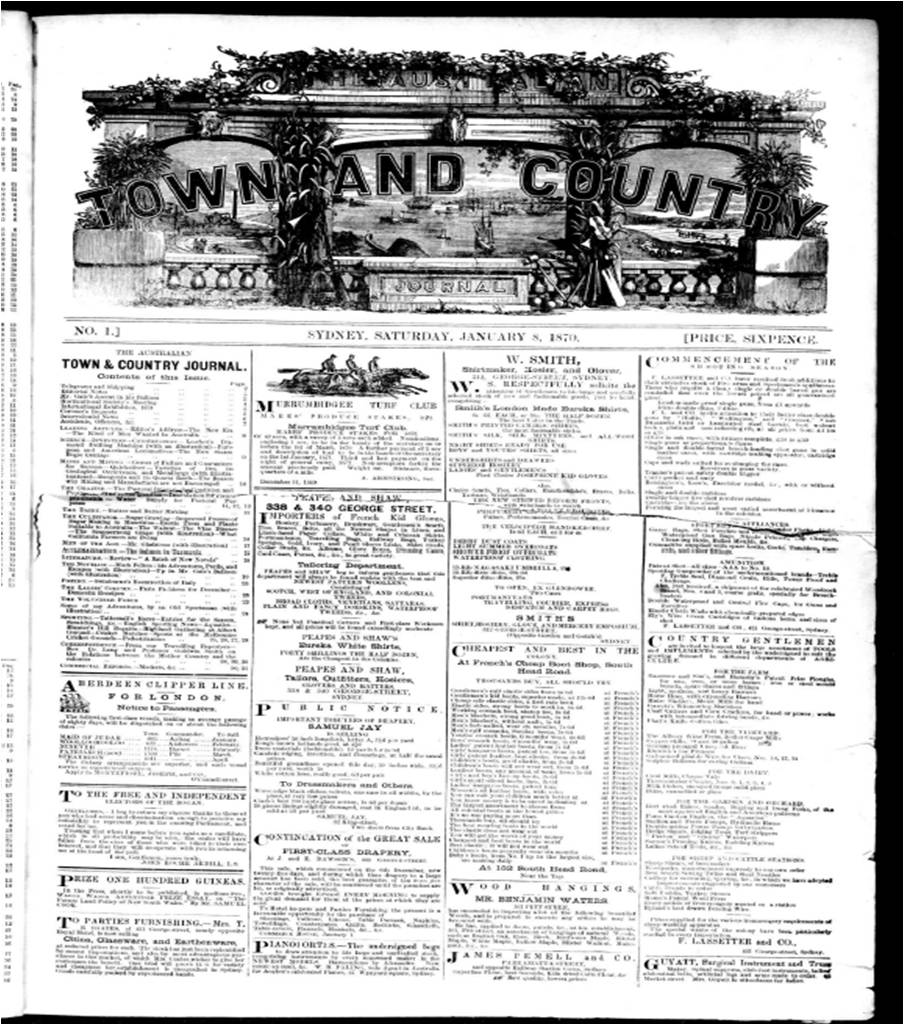
Australian Town & Country Journal, cover page, 8 January 1870

Australian Town and Country Journal was a weekly English language broadsheet newspaper published in Sydney, New South Wales, from 1870 to 1919. The paper was founded by Samuel Bennett with his intention for it to be "valuable to everybody for its great amount of useful and reliable information".

The paper was known for its range of topics, dealing with domestic and foreign news as well as featuring essays on literature, science and invention.

== History ==
The first issue of the Australian Town and Country Journal was published on 8 January 1870. The Journal ran until 25 June 1919. After 2 June 1878, when Samuel Bennett died, publication of the paper was taken over by his sons, Frank and Christopher.

== Digitisation ==
The paper has been digitised as part of the Australian Newspapers Digitisation Program project of the National Library of Australia.

== See also ==
- List of newspapers in Australia
- List of newspapers in New South Wales
