= Henry Kendall (poet) =

Australian author (1839–1882)

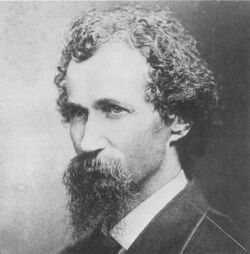
- Henry Kendall (pre-1882)
- Born: Thomas Henry Kendall; 18 April 1839; Yatte Yattah, New South Wales, Australia
- Died: 1 August 1882 (aged 43); Sydney
- Other name: Henry Clarence Kendall
- Occupations: Poet, inspector of state forests
- Spouse: Charlotte Rutter
- Children: Frederick C. Kendall

Thomas Henry Kendall (18 April 1839 (Note: Kendall's year of birth is recorded as 1839 in the Australian Dictionary of Biography and other modern reference works, also by A. G. Stephens. His gravestone has 18 April 1841, as believed by his children and hence found in numerous newspaper references.) – 1 August 1882), was an Australian author and bush poet, who was particularly known for his poems and tales set in a natural environment.

== Early life ==
Kendall was born in a settler's hut by Yackungarrah Creek in Yatte Yattah near Ulladulla, New South Wales, twin son (with Basil Edward Kendall) of Basil Kendall and his wife Matilda Kendall, née McNally, and baptised in the Presbyterian church. His father was the second son of Rev. Thomas Kendall, an Englishman who came to Sydney in 1809 and five years later went as a missionary to New Zealand, before settling in New South Wales in 1827.

Kendall has also been known as Henry Clarence Kendall, for reasons unknown (however at the age of 5, his parents moved to the Clarence River area of northern New South Wales).

Journalist and fellow poet A. G. Stephens sought to correct the confusion in 1928, publishing a pamphlet which included proof that the poet was baptised Thomas Henry Kendall, but stated the name of Henry Clarence Kendall at his wedding.

As a youth, he received a private education. When he was 15 he went to sea on a whaling voyage and was away for two years.

== Literary career ==
Starting from the age of 18, for ten years Kendall contributed articles to the Herald, Freeman's Journal, Sydney Punch, Empire, and the Australian Town and Country Journal with poetry and prose, before completing his first work, Poems and Songs for which he later thought little of it. It was this 1862 works however that introduced him to Henry Parkes, then-editor of the Empire.

In 1862 the English Athenaeum gave very high praise for some of the verses of Kendall, given "to be indicative of strong poetic faculty and power".

From 1863 to 1869 he was employed by the New South Wales Lands Department and then the Colonial Secretary's office. In 1868 he married Charlotte Rutter, the daughter of leading Sydney surgeon Dr John Rutter; his second works Leaves from Australian Forests (1869) became dedicated to her, with its various lyrics of "haunting and beautiful melodies".

Moving to Melbourne in 1869, he then contributed to the Australasian, Melbourne Argus, Telegraph, Punch, Colonial Monthly, and satirical papers Humbug and Touchstone; also winning a Sydney Morning Herald 1879 prize of 100 guineas (in 2024, worth more than A$19,000) for a poem on an Australian subject for which was "considered by the judges appointed far and away the best". He later wrote a cantata with composer Charles Edward Horsley (1822–1876) for the opening of the Melbourne Town Hall. Poet Adam Lindsay Gordon was a frequent visitor to the Kendall residence. Named for Araluen Creek in New South Wales, his much-loved, first child, and daughter (L)izzie Araluen died on 2 February 1870 aged 13 months, and was buried in "No Man's Land", the north-east corner of the Melbourne General Cemetery at Lygon and Macpherson Streets. At this time Kendall was noted to be poverty-stricken. In the December 1870 Sydney court trial, it was alleged that on 21 November 1870, Kendall presented a forged Commercial Bank cheque for £1 at a chemist shop at the corner of King and Pitt Streets. Temporary or partial insanity was raised in defence and with witnesses called, this and related matters were covered by the judge; the jury finding after fifteen minutes that Kendall was not guilty on grounds of insanity, whereon the prisoner was remanded in custody "until the pleasure of the Executive was made known". He was discharged from the Darlinghurst prison on 25 January 1871.

In 1874 Kendall returned to Brisbane Water north of Sydney, and a native knowledge of the landscape, employed as an inspector of forests until 1881. This position was given to him by now-Sir Henry Parkes. The family moved to the Narrara Creek area outside Gosford. This led to locations such as Kendall Rock and Kendall's Glen. He frequently visited Taree, and the family lived in Cundletown.

Eighteen years post his first volume, his third and final works, edited by his son Frederick, Songs from the Mountains was published in 1880. One review gave it five full columns of insights into Kendall's words.

His work was influenced by English poet Algernon Charles Swinburne (1837–1909), as evidenced in the poem Campaspe, US poet Edgar Allan Poe (1809–1849) in The last of his tribe, and English poet Matthew Arnold (1822–1888) in the sonnet A reward. He lacked the rich humour of fellow-colonial poet Brunton Stephens (1835–1902), but was recognised for his love of nature with "accurate and vivid descriptions of Australian scenery".

== Final years ==
The Kendalls had four sons (Frederick Clarence, Louis Frank, Athelstan, and Orara (1881–1882)), and three daughters (including Araluen (1869–1870) and Emily).

Kendall's son Frederick described the poet as having a striking appearance, sometimes impetuous of speech, jovial and intellectual, and "nothing gave him more pleasure than a bush ramble with his children". Kendall's wife Charlotte was equally described as literary, and "an accomplished musician and a bright conversationalist".

On the evening of Tuesday 1 August 1882, at his brother-in-law's residence in Bourke Street, Surry Hills, Kendall was given to have died of consumption at the age of 43, after a long ailment. He was ascribed as "the poet laureate of Australia", and compared to gifted Australian orator Daniel Deniehy (1828–1865) who died at 37.

A small funeral was held at the Waverley Cemetery on the afternoon of 4 August 1882. Arrangements were made for a monetary collection for Kendall's 32-year-old widow and children, with a monument also to be erected over the grave of "the New South Wales poet", to look out towards the sea. Yet by late 1884 it was noted there was no memorial stone and the grave looked neglected.

Kendall's grave was moved in late 1886, and the monument was erected in January 1887, unveiled by the NSW governor Lord Carrington, and oration by former-NSW attorney-general W. B. Dalley. The monument was of 25 feet (7.6 m) height, in Italian marble of three columns, the middle column being 20 feet (6.1 m) high, with the inscription:

Here lies Henry Kendall, poet: Born, 18th April, 1841, died, 1st August, 1882. Some of those who loved and admired him have, in grateful and lasting remembrance of his genius, built this monument above his ashes.

and beneath that, from Shelley's 1821 Adonais,

Awake him not! Surely he takes his fill
Of deep and liquid rest, forgetful of all ill.

On 21 January 1882, Kendall's infant son Orara died aged seven months, at their "Cliff Cottage" residence, Cundletown. Kendall's wife Charlotte died suddenly in October 1924, at Witing Street, Gore Hill, Sydney, aged 75, and buried alongside her husband. She was survived by their three sons and two daughters.

== Legacy ==
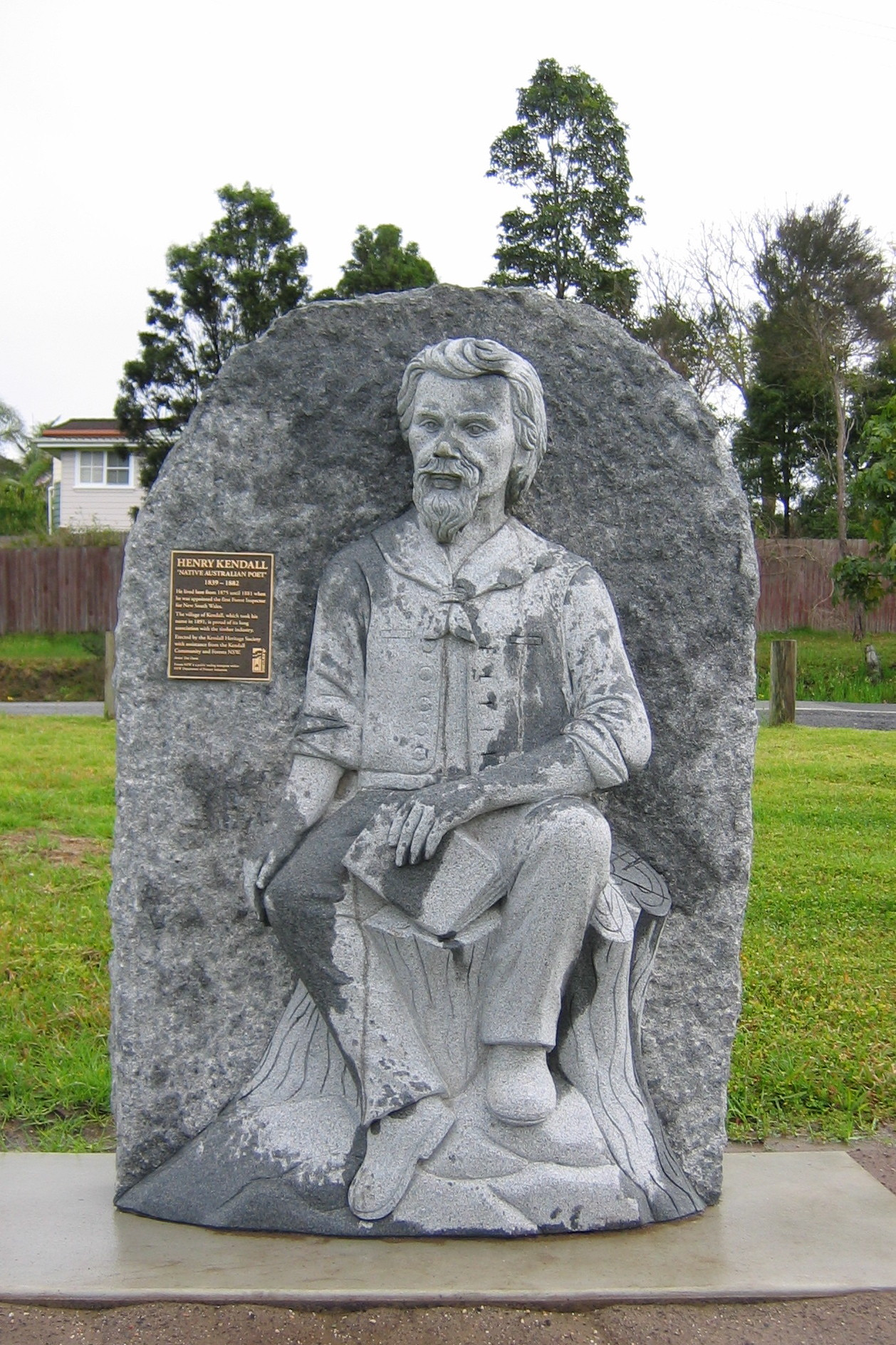
Monument in Kendall, NSW (2007)

In 1886 a memorial edition of his poems was published at Melbourne. A translation into German of selected poems by Henry Kendall taken from the book of his son Frederick C. Kendall appeared in 2021.

In late 1920 a memorial statue was proposed for the Sydney Domain, to great interest.

In 1926 a posthumous portrait of Kendall was painted by Tom Roberts (1856–1931), commissioned by the Australian Government, now at the National Library of Australia, Canberra.

In May 1940 a carved Bondi sandstone seat, 25 feet (7.6 m) long, was erected in one corner of the Royal Botanic Garden, Sydney to the cost of £500 funded from a bequest of Mrs A. M. Hamilton-Grey. Having written about Kendall, she felt he was "Australia's sweetest singer, and perhaps our great poet". The back of the seat has carved his words, "All my days have been the days of laborious life. and ever on my struggling soul has burnt the fierce light of this hurried sphere". When a member of the NSW public service, Kendall used to muse and write many of his poems in the park vicinity, enjoying the Moreton Bay fig trees and frequenting Mrs Macquarie's Chair.

The donor Agnes Maria Hamilton-Grey (d. February 1937) had written three books namely, Facts and fancies about 'Our son of the Woods'—Henry Kendall and his poetry (1920), Poet Kendall—His romantic history (1927), and Kendall—Our 'God-made chief' (1929), and upon her death left an estate of £2490, part of which was to make her books widely known. This matter was taken to court in 1938 with Kendall's sole-surviving son, Frederick Clarence Kendall asserting Hamilton-Grey's depiction of his parents' relationship was one of many inaccuracies. Despite this, the wish to reprint her works was approved. In the same year Frederick published Henry Kendall, His Later Years, self-described as "A Refutation of Mrs Hamilton-Grey's book Kendall Our God-made Chief".

Comboyne Street in Kendall has a granitic sculpture to the poet (GPS 31.632715°S 152.706367°E).

His name is given to several locations:

- The small village of Kendall on the Mid North Coast of New South Wales is named after him and not, as some suspect, after the similarly-spelled ancient town of Kendal in the County of Cumbria in England.
- A street in Elwood, Victoria.
- A street in Campbelltown, Padstow Heights, Mascot and Heathcote in New South Wales.
- A street and a park in Tarrawanna near Wollongong, New South Wales.

=== NSW Central Coast ===
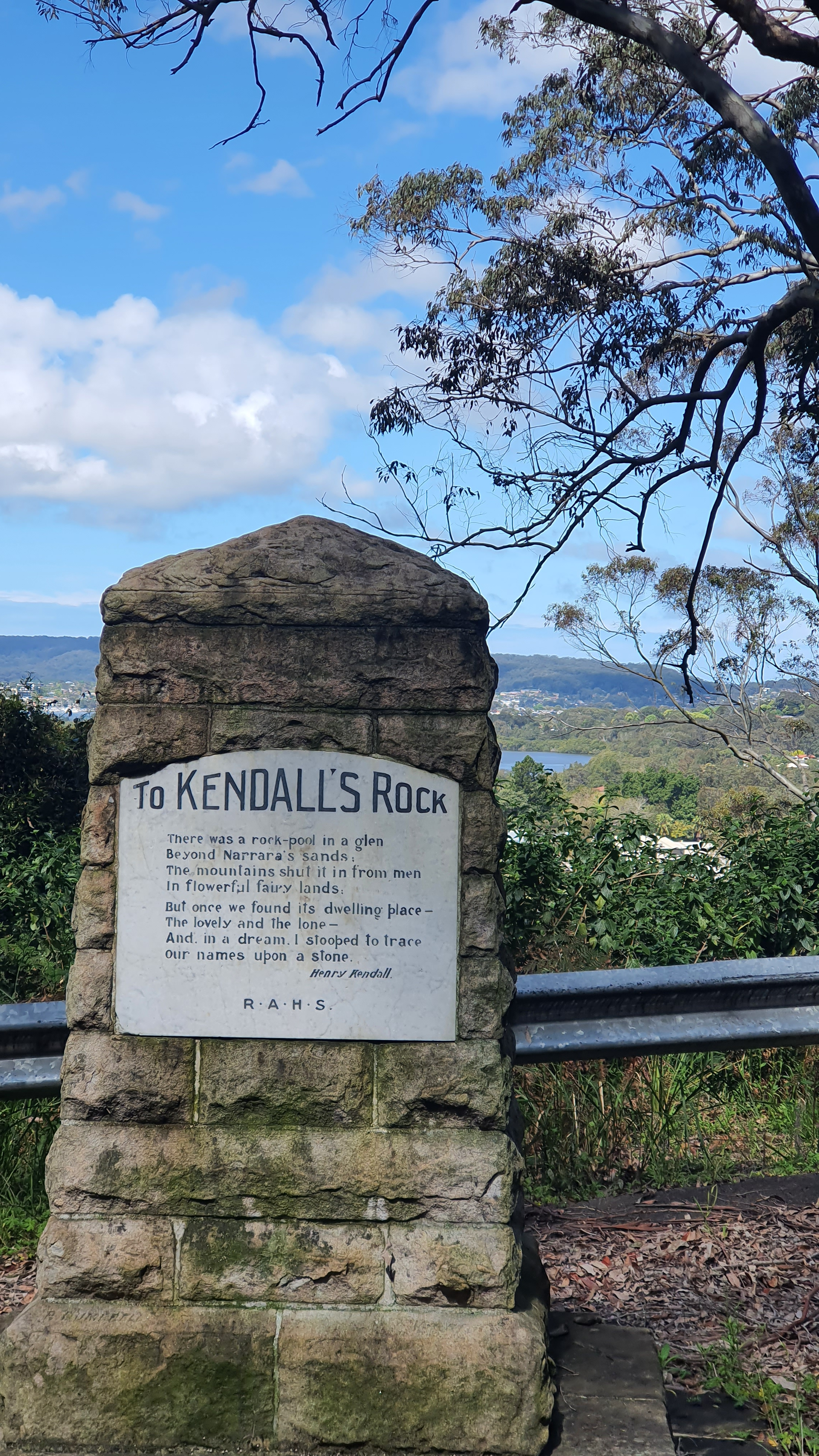
Kendall monument with poem inscription on plaque (2022)

On the New South Wales Central Coast, a number of locations are named in his honour:

- Henry Kendall Street in West Gosford is home to the stone building (now a museum known as 'Henry Kendall Cottage') where he lived for some time with the Fagans.
- A retirement village in the nearby suburb of Wyoming is also named in his honour: Henry Kendall Gardens (formally the Henry Kendall Village).
- Henry Kendall High School (also in West Gosford).
- The biennial Henry Kendall Poetry Award, run by Central Coast Poets Inc., has been won by poets Louise Oxley, Judy Johnson, and Joan Kerr.

Unveiled on 18 April 1931, on the hillside above West Gosford, near "Lookout – West Gosford" is a stone monument located on a tight bend of the Central Coast Highway, erected by the Erina Shire Council and the Royal Australian Historical Society. The moment included Frederick Kendall, and Joseph Fagan, in whose home the Kendalls lived for eleven years. The marble plaque is inscribed:

TO KENDALL'S ROCK
There was a rock-pool in a glen
Beyond Narrara's (Note: Narara, New South Wales) sands;
The mountains shut it in from men
In flowerful fairy lands.

But once we found its dwelling place—
The lovely and the lone—
And, in a dream, I stopped to trace
Our names upon a stone.

Henry Kendall

R.A.H.S.

== Bibliography ==
=== Poetry ===
- Poems and Songs (1862)
- Leaves from Australian Forests (1869)
- Songs from the Mountains (1880)
- Poems of Henry Kendall (1886)

=== Major individual works ===
- "The Glen of the White Man's Grave" (1860)
- "The Curlew Song" (1860)
- "Fainting By the Way" (1861)
- "The Barcoo : The Squatter's Song" (1862)
- "Daniel Henry Deniehy" (1865)
- "The Voyage of Telegonus" (1866)
- "Campaspe" (1866)
- "The Warrigal" (1867)
- "Moss on a Wall" (1868)
- "Rose Lorraine" (1869)
- "Prefatory Sonnets : I" (1869)
- "Prefatory Sonnets : II" (1869)
- "The Hut by the Black Swamp" (1869)
- "Aboriginal Death-Song" (1869)
- "Bush Lyrics : No. II : Camped by the Creek" (1870)
- "The Voice in the Native Oak" (1874)
- "Mooni" (1875)
- "Araluen" (1879)
- "Orara" (1879)
- "Kerrassu"

==== Selected list of poems ====
| Title | Year | First published | Reprinted/collected in |
|---|---|---|---|
| "The Rain Comes Sobbing to the Door" | 1861 | The Sydney Morning Herald, 23 August 1861 | Poems and Songs, J. R. Clarke, 1862, pp. 46–48 |
| "The Song of the Cattle Hunters" | 1861 | The Empire, 2 November 1861 | Poems and Songs, J. R. Clarke, 1862, pp. 26–27 |
| "The Muse of Australia" | 1862 | The Sydney Morning Herald, 28 August 1862 | Poems and Songs, J. R. Clarke, 1862, p. 1 |
| "The Last of His Tribe" | 1867 | The Sydney Morning Herald, 19 September 1867 | Leaves from Australian Forests, George Robertson, 1869, pp. 60–61 |
| "September in Australia" | 1867 | The Sydney Morning Herald, 25 November 1867 | Leaves from Australian Forests, George Robertson, 1869, pp. 7–9 |
| "Bell-Birds" | 1867 | The Sydney Morning Herald, 25 November 1867 | Leaves from Australian Forests, George Robertson, 1869, pp. 45–47 |
| "A Death in the Bush" | 1868 | Williams's Illustrated Australian Annual, 1868 | Leaves from Australian Forests, George Robertson, 1869, pp. 48–57 |
| "Rose Lorraine" | 1869 | | Leaves from Australian Forests, George Robertson, 1869, pp. 161–163 |
| "Song of the Shingle Splitters" | 1874 | The Australian Town and Country Journal, 2 May 1874 | Selected Poems of Henry Kendall, Angus and Robertson, 1957, pp. 150–151 |
| "Bill the Bullock Driver" | 1876 | The Australian Town and Country Journal, 1 April 1876 | Songs from the Mountains, William Maddock, 1880, pp. 58–63 |
| "Jim the Splitter" | 1880 | The Freeman's Journal, 21 February 1880 | Songs from the Mountains, William Maddock, 1880, pp. 38–43 |
| "To a Mountain" | 1880 | | Songs from the Mountains, William Maddock, 1880, pp. 3–7 |
| "Beyond Kerguelen" | 1880 | The Sydney Mail, 19 June 1880 | Songs from the Mountains, William Maddock, 1880, pp. 20–24 |
| "The Song of Ninian Melville" | 1880 | The Song of Ninian Melville / A Tour to Hell by Henry Kendall and Francis MacNamara, Cumberland Times | Selected Poems of Henry Kendall, Angus and Robertson, 1957, pp. 159–160 |
