= 1880 in poetry =

This article covers 1880 in poetry. Nationality words link to articles with information on the nation's poetry or literature (for instance, Irish or France).

== Events ==
- June 6 – Statue of Russian poet Alexander Pushkin (died 1837), sculpted by Alexander Opekushin, is unveiled in Strastnaya Square, Moscow

== Works published ==
=== United Kingdom ===
- H. C. Beeching and J. W. Mackail lead a group of seven Balliol College, Oxford members in publishing The Masque of B-ll—l, which is immediately suppressed by the authorities
- Robert Bridges, Poems (see also Poems 1873, 1879)
- Robert Browning, Dramatic Idyls, second series (see also Dramatic Idyls 1879)
- Jean Ingelow, Poems, Volume 1 is a reprint the 23rd edition of Poems (1863); Volume 2 is a reprint from the sixth edition of A Story of Doom (1867); (see also Poems: Third Series 1885)
- Andrew Lang, XXII Ballades in Blue China
- William McGonagall, "The Tay Bridge Disaster"
- Emily Pfeiffer, Sonnets and Songs
- Algernon Charles Swinburne:
  - The Heptalogia; or, The Seven Against Sense, parodies of seven contemporary poets: Alfred Lord Tennyson, Robert Browning, Elizabeth Browning, Coventry Patmore, Robert Bulwer-Lytton, Dante Gabriel Rossetti and Swinburne himself
  - Songs of the Springtides
  - Studies in Song
- John Addington Symonds, New and Old
- James Thomson, The City of Dreadful Night, and Other Poems, the title poem was first published in the National Reformer, March 22–May 17, 1874
- William Watson, The Prince's Quest, and Other Poems

=== United States ===
- Bret Harte, Poetical Works
- Oliver Wendell Holmes, The Iron Gate and Other Poems
- Sidney Lanier, The Science of English Verse, scholarship
- Henry Wadsworth Longfellow, Ultima Thule
- Richard Henry Stoddard, Poems

=== Other ===
- Rosario de Acuña, Morirse a tiempo, Spain
- Rosalia de Castro, Follas novas, Galician poems written in Spain
- Henry Kendall, Songs from the Mountains, Australia
- Guido Mazzoni, Versi, Italy
- Charles G. D. Roberts, Orion and Other Poems, Canada, published at author's expense
- Paul Verlaine, Sagesse, France

== Births ==
Death years link to the corresponding "[year] in poetry" article:

- January 14 – Joseph Warren Beach (died 1957), American poet, critic and literary scholar
- February 27 – Angelina Weld Grimke (died 1958), African American lesbian journalist and poet
- August 12 – Radclyffe Hall (died 1943), English lesbian poet and novelist
- August 24 – Bahinabai Chaudhari बहिणाबाई चौधरी (died 1951), illiterate, Indian, Marathi-language poet whose son writes down her poems
- August 26 – Guillaume Apollinaire (died 1918), French poet, writer and art critic
- September 16 – Alfred Noyes (died 1958), English poet, best known for his ballads "The Highwayman" (1906) and "The Barrel Organ"
- November 30 – Grant Hervey, born George Henry Cochrane (died 1933), Australian versifier and swindler
- December 2 – Elizabeth Rebecca Ward, née Daniels (died 1978), English versifier
- December 28 – C. Louis Leipoldt (died 1947), South African Afrikaans poet, writer and pediatrician

== Deaths ==
Birth years link to the corresponding "[year] in poetry" article:

- May 8 – Jones Very (born 1813), American essayist, poet, clergyman, and mystic associated with the American Transcendentalism movement
- June 20 – Eliza Dunlop (born 1796), Australian lyricist and ethnographer
- July 7 – Lydia Maria Child, 78 (born 1802), American abolitionist, Indian and women's rights activist, opponent of American expansionism, novelist, journalist and poet
- November 6 – Estanislao del Campo (born 1834), Argentine
- December 22 – George Eliot, pseudonym of Mary Ann Evans, 61 (born 1819), English novelist and poet
- December 30 – Epes Sargent (born 1813), American editor, poet and playwright

== See also ==
- 19th century in poetry
- 19th century in literature
- List of years in poetry
- List of years in literature
- Victorian literature
- French literature of the 19th century
- Poetry
