= Bertram Stevens (critic) =

Australian literary critic and editor (1872–1922)

- Stevens by David Low
- Born: Bertram William Mathyson Francis Stevens; 8 October 1872; Inverell, New South Wales
- Died: 14 February 1922 (aged 49); Sydney, New South Wales, Australia
- Writing career
- Language: English
- Years active: 1874-1921
- Notable work: An Anthology of Australian Verse

Bertram William Mathyson Francis Stevens (8 October 1872 – 14 February 1922) was an Australian journal editor (Single Tax; Native Companion; Art in Australia; Lone Hand); literary and art critic; and anthologist (An Anthology of Australian Verse [which contained five poems by Henry Lawson]; The Golden Treasury of Australian Verse).

Stevens was born at Inverell, New South Wales, the eldest child of William Mathison Stevens and his wife Marian, née Cafe, from Queanbeyan. By 1882 Stevens moved with his family to Newtown, Sydney where he was educated at public schools. Stevens was an avid reader and developed a wide knowledge and culture. In 1895 he began a fifteen-year period as a solicitor's clerk and it was intended that he should study law. During this time Stevens worked as a freelance journalist, coming into contact with a number of literary figures, he edited My Sundowner and other Poems (1904) by John Farrell with a memoir.

Stevens campaigned for the land policies of Henry George, temporarily winning Henry Lawson to the cause. He was a founding member of the Dawn and Dusk Club in 1899 and of the Casuals Club in 1906. Stevens was deeply involved with attempts at rehabilitating Henry Lawson at Yanco, New South Wales and Edwin Brady's property at Mallacoota, Victoria.

Stevens died suddenly of cerebral haemorrhage and chronic nephritis at Sydney, on 14 February 1922. He left a widow, two sons and a daughter. Henry Lawson wrote a warm confessional tribute in The Bulletin.

== Bibliography ==
=== Poetry anthologies ===
- An Anthology of Australian Verse (1907)
- The Australian Birthday Book : Passages Selected from Australia and New Zealand Poetry (1908)
- The Golden Treasury of Australian Verse (1909)
- Selections from the Australian Poets (1913)
- The Children's Treasury of Australian Verse (1913)
- A Book of Australian Verse for Boys and Girls (1915)
- The Australian Soldiers' Gift Book (1916)
- The Bulletin Book of Humorous Verses and Recitations (1920)

=== Selected work ===
- My Sundowner and Other Poems by John Farrell (1904)
- Wine and Roses by Victor J. Daley (1911)
- Oswald Watt, Lieut.-Colonel A.F.C., O.B.E., Legion of Honour, Croix de Guerre : a tribute to his memory by a few of his friends edited with Ernest Watt and Ure Smith (1921)
