= 100 Australian Poems You Need to Know =

2008 Australian poetry anthology

- Author: Jamie Grant (editor)
- Language: English
- Genre: Poetry anthology
- Publisher: Hardie Grant Books
- Publication date: 2008
- Publication place: Australia
- Media type: Print
- Pages: 247 pp.
- ISBN: 9781740666206

100 Australian Poems You Need to Know is an anthology of poems edited by Australian writer Jamie Grant, published by Hardie Grant Books in 2008.

The collection contains 100 Australian poems from a variety of sources. Also included are a Foreword by Phillip Adams and an introduction by the editor.

The poems are split into nine different sections with individual poems arranged by ascending year of the poet's birth (where this is known).

== Contents ==
Convict and Stockrider

- "A Convict's Tour of Hell", Francis MacNamara
- "The Beautiful Squatter", Charles Harpur
- "Taking the Census", Charles Thatcher
- "The Sick Stockrider", Adam Lindsay Gordon

The Red Page

- "My Other Chinee Cook", J. Brunton Stephens
- "Bell-Birds", Henry Kendall
- "Are You the Cove?", Joseph Furphy
- "How M'Dougal Topped the Score", Thos. E. Spencer
- "The Wail of the Waiter : A Tavern Catch", Marcus Clarke
- "Where the Pelican Builds Her Nest", Mary Hannay Foott
- "Catching the Coach", Alfred Chandler
- "Narcissus and Some Tadpoles", Victor J. Daley

Gundagai to Ironbark

- "Nine Miles From Gundagai", Jack Moses
- "The Duke of Buccleuch. An Old Story in a New Verse", J. A. Phelp
- "How We Drove the Trotter", W. T. Goodge
- "Our Ancient Ruin", Crupper D.
- "The Brucedale Scandal", Mary Gilmore
- "Since the Country Carried Sheep", Breaker Morant
- "The Man from Ironbark", A. B. Paterson
- "The Old Whim Horse", Edward Dyson
- "Where the Dead Men Lie", Barcroft Boake
- "Australia", Bernard O'Dowd
- "The Stockman's Cheque", E. W. Hornung
- "The Bullocky's Love-Episode", A. F. York

Bastard and Bushranger

- "The Bastard from the Bush", Anonymous
- "When Your Pants Begin to Go", Henry Lawson
- "The Fisher", Roderic Quinn
- "The Mystery Man", N. Q.
- "Emus", Mary E. Fullerton
- "The Death of Ben Hall", Will H. Ogilvie
- "The Coachman's Yarn", E. J. Brady
- "Fire in the Heavens", Christopher Brennan
- "The Orange Tree", John Shaw Neilson
- "The Dummy Bridge", C. J. Dennis
- "Morning", Hugh McCrae

Drought, Dusk and War

- "Said Hanrahan", John O'Brien
- "The Victoria Markets Recollected in Tranquillity", Furnley Maurice
- "Sea Music", W. J. Turner
- "Dusk in the Domain", Dorothea Mackellar
- "Kangaroo", D. H. Lawrence
- "Women Are Not Gentlemen", Harley Matthews
- "Day's End", Lesbia Harford
- "The Jester in the Trench", Leon Gellert
- "On Having Grown Old", Ernest G. Moll

Country Story

- "South Country", Kenneth Slessor
- "Football Field : Evening", J. A. R. McKellar
- "Country Places : Hell, Hay and Booligal!", A. D. Hope
- "They'll Tell You about Me", Ian Mudie
- "Death of a Whale", John Blight
- "A Country Song", Douglas Stewart
- "Bullocky", Judith Wright
- "The Australian Dream", David Campbell
- "The Tomb of Lt. John Learmonth, AIF", J. S. Manifold
- "Song Cycle of the Moon-Bone", Wonguri-Mandjigai People, Ronald M. Berndt (translator)
- "Because", James McAuley
- "A Curse on Herod", Amy Witting
- "A Simple Story", Gwen Harwood

Melbourne and Sydney

- "The Cliff", David Rowbotham
- "Lament for St Maria Goretti", Francis Webb
- "Stroke", Vincent Buckley
- "All Friends Together : A Survey of Present-Day Australian Poetry", R. A. Simpson
- "Affair of the Heart", Peter Porter
- "Life-Cycle", Bruce Dawe
- "Defeat", Evan Jones
- "Bequest", Philip Martin
- "Balmoral Summer '66", Vivian Smith
- "Early Discoveries", David Malouf
- "Threnody for Patrick White", Barry Humphries
- "Melbourne", Chris Wallace-Crabbe
- "At the Baths", Graeme Kinross-Smith
- "A Lifetime Devoted to Literature", Judith Rodriguez

Beyond Sprawl

- "The Quality of Sprawl", Les Murray
- "Bring Me the Sweat of Gabriela Sabatini", Clive James
- "Smalltown Memorials", Geoff Page
- "The Old Colonist", Andrew Taylor
- "The Old Rifle (Ross' Poems : 5)", Geoffrey Lehmann
- "The Blizzard", Roger McDonald
- "Anyone Home?", John Tranter
- "The Departing Light", Robert Gray
- "Sestina on Taking a Bus into Perth Past the Narrows Bridge", Hal Colebatch
- "Kidding Myself in Kuta, Bali : A Pantoum", Alan Smith
- "Learning to Write", Gary Catalano
- "Profiles of My Father", Rhyll McMaster
- "Barbecue", Peter Kocan
- "My Grandmother's Ghost", Kate Jennings
- "Ballade for Alan Gould", Alan Wearne
- "Pliers", Alan Gould
- "On Seeing the First Flasher", Vicki Raymond

The Generation of XYZ

- "Ode to Karl Marx", John Forbes
- "Fantasia on a Theme by Thomas Tallis", Stephen Edgar
- "The Members of the Orchestra", Kevin Hart
- "The Ferris Wheel", Jennifer Harrison
- "The Domesticity of Giraffes", Judith Beveridge
- "When I Consider", Gig Ryan
- "Sky Writing", Sarah Day
- "Life", Kathleen Stewart
- "The Big Goanna", Philip Hodgins
- "Holy Sydney", Harry Cummins
- "Kristallnacht", Jemal Sharah
- "After Wendy Cope", Stephen McInerney

== Critical reception ==
Reviewing the anthology for The Australian newspaper Jaya Savage saw the good aspects of the book: "If an historical anthology such as this is like a used car, the paint job on 100 Australian Poems is slick. Under the bonnet, the engine is in good nick, the poems are sturdy, the pistons greased, the spark plugs firing; Australian poetry can hold its head high among English-speaking traditions, and Grant is to be commended for his toil." Although that was followed by: "Sadly, however, the vehicle's chassis, the book's critical framework, shows serious signs of rust damage. The giveaway is Grant's unashamed reversion to a nationalistic discourse, which gives the book a sepia effect."

== Notes ==
In his introduction editor Jamie Grant gave an explanation for his choices: "The selection made represents the opinion of one person only, with all the prejudices, accidental omissions and blind spots one individual must be prone to, and the individual is me. There has been no attempt to be fair or comprehensive or respectable or historically representative. Instead, I have simply chosen a hundred Australian poems I, as a reader, have been unable to forget."

== See also ==
- 2008 in Australian literature
