= 1963 in Australian literature =

This article presents a list of the historical events and publications of Australian literature during 1963.

== Major publications ==
=== Books ===
- Jessica Anderson – An Ordinary Lunacy
- Jon Cleary – Forests of the Night
- Sumner Locke Elliott – Careful, He Might Hear You
- Catherine Gaskin – The Tilsit Inheritance
- Barbara Jefferis – Wild Grapes
- Mungo MacCallum – Son of Mars
- Randolph Stow – Tourmaline
- Arthur Upfield – The Body at Madman's Bend
- Morris West – The Shoes of the Fisherman

=== Short stories ===
- A. Bertram Chandler – Beyond the Galactic Rim
- Jon Cleary – Pillar of Salt and Other Stories
- Peter Cowan – "The Voice"
- Frank Hardy – Legends from Benson's Valley
- Shirley Hazzard – Cliffs of Fall and Other Stories
- Xavier Herbert – Larger Than Life : Twenty Short Stories
- Hal Porter – "Gretel"
- Colin Thiele – Favourite Australian Stories (edited)
- Patrick White
  - "Clay"
  - "Down at the Dump"
  - "Miss Slattery and Her Demon Lover"

=== Children's and Young Adult fiction ===
- Nan Chauncy – The Roaring 40
- L. H. Evers – Danny's Wonderful Uncle
- John Gunn – The Goodbye Island
- Eric Lambert – Dolphin
- Joan Phipson – Threat to the Barkers
- Eleanor Spence – The Green Laurel
- Colin Thiele – Storm Boy

=== Poetry ===
- Bruce Dawe – "And a Good Friday Was Had By All"
- Gwen Harwood
  - Poems
  - "Suburban Sonnet" (as by "Miriam Stone")
- Dorothy Hewett - What About the People! (with Merv Lilley)
- A. D. Hope
  - "Crossing the Frontier"
  - "A Letter from Rome"
- James McAuley – "Pieta"
- Ian Mudie – The North-Bound Rider
- Peter Porter – "Your Attention Please"
- Chris Wallace-Crabbe – In Light and Darkness
- Henry Kendall – Henry Kendall (edited by T. Inglis Moore)
- John Shaw Neilson – Shaw Neilson (edited by Judith Wright)
- Judith Wright – Five Senses : Selected Poems

=== Biography ===
- Miles Franklin – Childhood at Brindabella : My First Ten Years
- Xavier Herbert – Disturbing Element
- Alan Marshall – In Mine Own Heart
- Hal Porter – The Watcher on the Cast-Iron Balcony

=== Non-fiction ===
- Geoffrey Blainey – The Rush That Never Ended : A History of Australian Mining

=== Drama ===
- Alan Hopgood – And the Big Men Fly
- Hal Porter – The Tower
- Patrick White – A Cheery Soul

== Awards and honours ==
=== Literary ===
Award	Author	Title	Publisher
ALS Gold Medal	John Morrison	Twenty-Three : Stories	Australasian Book Society
Miles Franklin Award	Sumner Locke Elliott	Careful, He Might Hear You	Angus and Robertson

=== Children and Young Adult ===
Award	Category	Author	Title	Publisher
Children's Book of the Year Award	Older Readers	Joan Phipson	The Family Conspiracy	Constable
Children's Book of the Year Award	Picture Book	No award		

=== Poetry ===
Award	Author	Title	Publisher
Grace Leven Prize for Poetry	Ian Mudie	The North-Bound Rider	Rigby

== Births ==
A list, ordered by date of birth (and, if the date is either unspecified or repeated, ordered alphabetically by surname) of births in 1963 of Australian literary figures, authors of written works or literature-related individuals follows, including year of death.

- 19 July – Garth Nix, novelist
- 30 September – Stan Grant, non-fiction writer and journalist
- 8 October – Nick Earls, novelist

Unknown date

- Jennie Adams, romance novelist
- Ali Cobby Eckermann, poet
- Catherine Jinks, novelist
- John Kinsella, poet
- Mandy Sayer, novelist
- Donna Williams, writer, artist, singer-songwriter, screenwriter and sculptor (died 2017)

== Deaths ==
A list, ordered by date of death (and, if the date is either unspecified or repeated, ordered alphabetically by surname) of deaths in 1963 of Australian literary figures, authors of written works or literature-related individuals follows, including year of birth.

- 30 January – Will H. Ogilvie, poet (born 1869)
- 11 March – Deirdre Cash (Criena Rohan), Australian novelist (born 1924)
- 24 July – Ruth Bedford, poet (born 1882)

== See also ==
- 1963 in Australia
- 1963 in literature
- 1963 in poetry
- List of years in Australian literature
- List of years in literature
