= Cross-Country : A Book of Australian Verse =

1984 poetry anthology edited by John Barnes and Brian McFarlane

- Author: John Barnes and Brian McFarlane
- Language: English
- Genre: Poetry anthology
- Publisher: Heinemann Publishers
- Publication date: 1984
- Publication place: Australia
- Media type: Print
- Pages: 285 pp.

Cross-Country : A Book of Australian Verse is an anthology of poetry edited by John Barnes and Brian McFarlane, published by Heinemann in 1984.

The collection contains 177 poems, from a variety of sources.

== Contents ==
- "A Midsummer Noon in the Australian Forest", Charles Harpur
- "Aboriginal Death Song", Charles Harpur
- "The Dream by the Fountain", Charles Harpur
- "The Creek of the Four Graves", Charles Harpur
- "Prefatory Sonnets : I", Henry Kendall
- "Prefatory Sonnets : II", Henry Kendall
- "The Muse of Australia", Henry Kendall
- "The Last of His Tribe", Henry Kendall
- "Bell-Birds", Henry Kendall
- "September in Australia", Henry Kendall
- "Bill the Bullock Driver", Henry Kendall
- "The Man from Snowy River", A. B. Paterson
- "Clancy of the Overflow", A. B. Paterson
- "Black Swans", A. B. Paterson
- "The Ballad of the Drover", Henry Lawson
- "The Roaring Days", Henry Lawson
- "The Sliprails and the Spur", Henry Lawson
- "Middleton's Rouseabout", Henry Lawson
- "Borderland", Henry Lawson
- "The Wanderer : 1902- : 86", Christopher Brennan
- "The Wanderer : 1902- : 87", Christopher Brennan
- "The Wanderer : 1902- : 89", Christopher Brennan
- "The Wanderer : 1902- : 88", Christopher Brennan
- "The Wanderer : 1902- : 90", Christopher Brennan
- "How Old is My Heart (The Wanderer : 1902- : 91)", Christopher Brennan
- "The Wanderer : 1902- : 92", Christopher Brennan
- "The Wanderer : 1902- : 93", Christopher Brennan
- "The Wanderer : 1902- : 94", Christopher Brennan
- "The Wanderer : 1902- : 95", Christopher Brennan
- "The Wanderer : 1902- : 96", Christopher Brennan
- "The Wanderer : 1902- : 97", Christopher Brennan
- "The Wanderer : 1902- : 98", Christopher Brennan
- "The Wanderer : 1902- : 99", Christopher Brennan
- "The Orange Tree", John Shaw Neilson
- "Love's Coming", John Shaw Neilson
- "Song Be Delicate", John Shaw Neilson
- "The Crane Is My Neighbour", John Shaw Neilson
- "The Gentle Water Bird", John Shaw Neilson
- "The Moon Was Seven Days Down", John Shaw Neilson
- "The Bard and the Lizard", John Shaw Neilson
- "The Sundowner", John Shaw Neilson
- "I Spoke to the Violet", John Shaw Neilson
- "The Poor Can Feed the Birds", John Shaw Neilson
- "The Smoker Parrot", John Shaw Neilson
- "Earth-Visitors (to N. L.)", Kenneth Slessor
- "The Night-Ride", Kenneth Slessor
- "Five Visions of Captain Cook", Kenneth Slessor
- "South Country", Kenneth Slessor
- "Out of Time", Kenneth Slessor
- "Australia", A. D. Hope
- "The Wandering Islands", A. D. Hope
- "Conquistador", A. D. Hope
- "Pyramis or The House of Ascent", A. D. Hope
- "The Death of the Bird", A. D. Hope
- "Meditation on a Bone", A. D. Hope
- "The Double Looking Glass", A. D. Hope
- "Ode on the Death of Pius the Twelfth", A. D. Hope
- "On an Engraving by Casserius", A. D. Hope
- "Moschus Moschiferus : A Song for St Cecilia's Day", A. D. Hope
- "Hay Fever", A. D. Hope
- "Tasmanian Magpies", A. D. Hope
- "Bora Ring", Judith Wright
- "Bullocky", Judith Wright
- "Brother and Sisters", Judith Wright
- "For New England", Judith Wright
- "Woman to Child", Judith Wright
- "Woman to Man", Judith Wright
- "The Bull", Judith Wright
- "The Old Prison", Judith Wright
- "Request to a Year", Judith Wright
- "The Harp and the King", Judith Wright
- "The Forest", Judith Wright
- "Remembering an Aunt", Judith Wright
- "Harry Pearce", David Campbell
- "Who Points the Swallow", David Campbell
- "On the Birth of a Son", David Campbell
- "Night Sowing", David Campbell
- "Droving", David Campbell
- "Mothers and Daughters", David Campbell
- "The Australian Dream", David Campbell
- "Bellbirds", David Campbell
- "Envoi for a Book of Poems", James McAuley
- "Autumn", Rainer Maria Rilke , James McAuley (translator)
- "Terra Australis", James McAuley
- "Memorial", James McAuley
- "An Art of Poetry", James McAuley
- "A Leaf of Sage", James McAuley
- "Merry-Go-Round", James McAuley
- "The Inception of the Poem", James McAuley
- "Pieta", James McAuley
- "Because", James McAuley
- "Country Press", Rosemary Dobson
- "The Bystander", Rosemary Dobson
- "Child with a Cockatoo", Rosemary Dobson
- "The Birth", Rosemary Dobson
- "The Two Countries", Rosemary Dobson
- "Cock Crow", Rosemary Dobson
- "In a Strange House", Rosemary Dobson
- "The Old Wife's Tale", Gwen Harwood
- "In the Park", Walter Lehmann
- "Suburban Sonnet", Miriam Stone
- "New Music", Gwen Harwood
- "Father and Child: I Barn Owl", Gwen Harwood
- "Father and Child: II Nightfall", Gwen Harwood
- "Lamplight", Gwen Harwood
- "Morgan's Country", Francis Webb
- "A Leper", Francis Webb
- "A Death at Winson Green", Francis Webb
- "Five Days Old", Francis Webb
- "Stroke", Vincent Buckley
- "Letters to Live Poets : Frank O'Hara", Bruce Beaver
- "Letters to Live Poets : XII", Bruce Beaver
- "Letters to Live Poets : XV", Bruce Beaver
- "Letters to Live Poets : XIX", Bruce Beaver
- "The Entertainer", Bruce Beaver
- "Phar Lap in the Melbourne Museum", Peter Porter
- "Sydney Cove, 1788", Peter Porter
- "How to Get a Girl Friend", Peter Porter
- "The Great Poet Comes Here in Winter", Peter Porter
- "An Australian Garden", Peter Porter
- "An Exequy", Peter Porter
- "The Not-So-Good Earth", Bruce Dawe
- "Life-Cycle", Bruce Dawe
- "Search and Destroy : A Bi-Centenary Poem", Bruce Dawe
- "Homecoming", Bruce Dawe
- "Exiles", Bruce Dawe
- "The Burning Truck", Les Murray
- "Noonday Axeman", Les Murray
- "Evening Alone at Bunyah", Les Murray
- "An Absolutely Ordinary Rainbow", Les Murray
- "The Ballad of Jimmy Governor : H.M. Prison, Darlinghurst, 18th January 1901", Les Murray
- "The Buladelah-Taree Holiday Song Cycle", Les Murray
- "The Sick Stockrider", Adam Lindsay Gordon
- "Old Botany Bay", Mary Gilmore
- "Nationality", Mary Gilmore
- "Where the Dead Men Lie", Barcroft Boake
- "Australia", Bernard O'Dowd
- "Said Hanrahan", John O'Brien
- "My Country", Dorothea Mackellar
- "The Wind at Your Door", Robert D. FitzGerald
- "They'll Tell You about Me", Ian Mudie
- "Christopher Columbus : Space (Columbus Goes West)", William Hart-Smith
- "Altjeringa", Roland Robinson
- "A Sailor's Grave", John Blight
- "Death of a Whale", John Blight
- "Terra Australis", Douglas Stewart
- "B Flat", Douglas Stewart
- "The Children Go", Kenneth Mackenzie
- "An Old Inmate", Kenneth Mackenzie
- "The Tomb of Lt. John Learmonth, AIF" J. S. Manifold
- "The Tree", Dorothy Auchterlonie
- "Farmer Goes Berserk", Anne Elder
- "We Are Going", Oodgeroo Noonuccal
- "The Tantanoola Tiger", Max Harris
- "Anniversary"", Dorothy Hewett
- "Captain Oates, 1912", R. A. Simpson
- "Ethel", R. A. Simpson
- "Kaddish (for My Father Born 1903, Died at Sea, 1967)", Fay Zwicky
- "Melbourne", Chris Wallace-Crabbe
- "Suburban", David Malouf
- "The Utopia of Lord Mayor Howard", Randolph Stow
- "The Singing Bones", Randolph Stow
- "Eskimo Occasion", Judith Rodriguez
- "Five Days Late", Geoffrey Lehmann
- "Developing a Wife", Andrew Taylor
- "1915", Roger McDonald
- "The Journey", Rhyll McMaster
- "Like This for Years", Michael Dransfield
- "St Bartholomew Remembers Jesus Christ as an Athlete", Alan Wearne
- "A Dream of France", Kevin Hart
- "The Old", Kevin Hart

== Publication history ==
The anthology was re-issued in a second edition in 1988 with the following changes:

=== Poems added ===
- "Beach Burial", Kenneth Slessor
- "Windy Gap", David Campbell
- "Mother Who Gave Me Life", Gwen Harwood
- "Drifters", Bruce Dawe
- "Fatherless", Lesbia Harford
- "Periodicity", Lesbia Harford
- "Once I Thought My Love...", Lesbia Harford
- "Song in Autumn", Robert D. FitzGerald
- "Love Me and Never Leave Me", Ronald McCuaig
- "The Passionate Clerk on His Leave", Ronald McCuaig
- "Orpheus and the Wild Beasts", Harold Stewart
- "To Horace", David Lake
- "Reading the Lines", Philip Martin
- "Christmas Ghosts", Philip Martin
- "Deathbed Sketch", Vivian Smith
- "Twenty Years of Sydney", Vivian Smith
- "Migrant Woman on a Melbourne Tram", Jennifer Strauss
- "Freedom Fighter", Antigone Kefala
- "Under an Aboriginal Tree", Mudrooroo Narogin
- "Small Town Memorials", Geoff Page
- "Eve", Kate Llewellyn
- "In the Early Hours...", Robert Gray
- "Letter from the Barrier Reef", Mark O'Connor

=== Poem deleted ===
- "Lamplight", Gwen Harwood

== Critical reception ==
In an essay analysing "We are Going" by Oodgeroo Noonuccal, which is included in this anthology, a writer for Bartleby Research stated that the book "contains a comprehensible and thought-provoking selection of Australian poetry from the early years of European settlement to the present. A common thread that connects numerous poems in the Cross Country anthology is the contrast between what the past was and what it is now. This is shown through the loss of aboriginal culture and past times. Each poem expresses a different scenario or memory about the loss of indigenous culture and how the past was a noble past, as compared to the present."

== See also ==
- 1984 in Australian literature
