= 1975 in Australian literature =

This article presents a list of the historical events and publications of Australian literature during 1975.

== Events ==
- Radical poet Dorothy Hewett publishes her collection Rapunzel in Suburbia, triggering a successful libel action by her lawyer ex-husband Lloyd Davies.
- McPhee Gribble publishing house is founded by Di Gribble and Hilary McPhee

== Major publications ==
=== Books ===
- James Aldridge – The Untouchable Juli
- Jessica Anderson – The Commandant
- Jon Cleary – The Safe House
- Sumner Locke Elliott – Going
- Frank Hardy – But the Dead Are Many
- Xavier Herbert – Poor Fellow My Country
- Thomas Keneally
  - Gossip from the Forest
  - Moses the Lawgiver
- David Malouf – Johnno
- William Nagle – The Odd Angry Shot

=== Short stories ===
- Murray Bail
  - "A,B,C,D,E,F,G,H,I,J,K,L,M,N,O,P,Q,R,S,T,U,V,W,X,Y,Z"
  - Contemporary Portraits and Other Stories
  - "The Drover's Wife"
- Peter Carey – "Do You Love Me?"

=== Science Fiction and Fantasy ===
- A. Bertram Chandler
  - The Big Black Mark
  - The Broken Cycle
- Sumner Locke Elliott – Going
- Cordwainer Smith
  - The Best of Cordwainer Smith
  - Norstrilia

=== Children's and Young Adult fiction ===
- Elyne Mitchell – The Colt at Taparoo

=== Poetry ===
- Gwen Harwood – Selected Poems
- Dorothy Hewett – Rapunzel in Suburbia
- A. D. Hope
  - "Country Places : Hell, Hay and Booligal!"
  - A Late Picking : Poems 1965-1974
- Kate Jennings – Mother I'm Rooted : An Anthology of Australian Women Poets (edited)
- Les Murray – "The Powerline Incarnation"
- Peter Porter
  - "An Exequy"
  - Living in a Calm Country
- Thomas Shapcott – Shabbytown Calendar

=== Drama ===
- Robert J. Merritt – The Cake Man
- Steve J. Spears – The Elocution of Benjamin Franklin

=== Biography ===
- Charles Perkins – A Bastard Like Me

=== Non-fiction ===
- Geoffrey Blainey – Triumph of the Nomads : A History of Ancient Australia
- Anne Summers – Damned Whores and God's Police

== Awards and honours ==
=== Lifetime achievement ===
Award	Author
Christopher Brennan Award	Judith Wright
Patrick White Award	David Campbell

=== Literary ===
Award	Author	Title	Publisher
The Age Book of the Year Award	Thea Astley	A Kindness Cup	Nelson Books
ALS Gold Medal	Not awarded		
Colin Roderick Award	Denis Murphy	T.J. Ryan	University of Queensland Press

=== Fiction ===
Award	Author	Title	Publisher
The Age Book of the Year Award	Thea Astley	A Kindness Cup	Nelson Books
Miles Franklin Award	Xavier Herbert	Poor Fellow My Country	Fontana Books

=== Children and Young Adult ===
Award	Category	Author	Title	Publisher
Children's Book of the Year Award	Older Readers	Not awarded		
Children's Book of the Year Award	Picture Book	A. B. Paterson, illustrated by Quentin Hole	The Man from Ironbark	Collins

=== Science fiction and fantasy ===
Award	Category	Author	Title	Publisher
Australian SF Achievement Award	Best Australian Science Fiction	A. Bertram Chandler	The Bitter Pill	Wren Publishing

=== Poetry ===
Award	Author	Title	Publisher
Grace Leven Prize for Poetry	Gwen Harwood	Selected Poems	Angus and Robertson

=== Drama ===
Award	Author	Title
AWGIE Award for Stage	Jim McNeil	How Does Your Garden Grow?

=== Non-fiction ===
Award	Author	Title	Publisher
The Age Book of the Year Award	Not awarded		

== Births ==
A list, ordered by date of birth (and, if the date is either unspecified or repeated, ordered alphabetically by surname) of births in 1975 of Australian literary figures, authors of written works or literature-related individuals follows, including year of death.

- 23 June — Markus Zusak, novelist

Unknown date

- Nardi Simpson, novelist and musician

== Deaths ==
A list, ordered by date of death (and, if the date is either unspecified or repeated, ordered alphabetically by surname) of deaths in 1975 of Australian literary figures, authors of written works or literature-related individuals follows, including year of birth.

- 11 January — Paul Grano, poet and journalist (born 1894)
- 13 January — Winifred Birkett, novelist (born 1897)
- 25 May — Clive Turnbull, writer and journalist (born 1906)

== See also ==
- 1975 in Australia
- 1975 in literature
- 1975 in poetry
- List of years in Australian literature
- List of years in literature
