= Seven Emus =

1959 Australian novel by Xaview Herbert

- First edition
- Author: Xavier Herbert
- Language: English
- Genre: Fiction
- Publisher: Angus and Robertson
- Publication date: 1959
- Publication place: Australia
- Media type: Print
- Pages: 147 pp
- Preceded by: Capricornia
- Followed by: Soldiers' Women

Seven Emus (1959) is a novel by Australian author Xavier Herbert.

== Plot outline ==
The novel's plot revolves around the attempt by two villains to steal a unique piece of Indigenous Australian sculpture.

== Critical reception ==
A reviewer in The Canberra Times called it an "improbable" tale, and was disappointed overall: "It is a pity that Xavier Herbert has chosen such an unlikely story to tell and that he has not fully disciplined his style and content to the exacting requirements of a short novel, for there is much in Seven Emus that is of high quality. Once the story gets under way, the plot unfolds swiftly, there is much understanding and humorous commenting on the more probable characters, and there is an overall understanding of the aborigines and of the North-West that is not often seen in Australian literature."

== See also ==
- 1959 in Australian literature
