= 1923 in Australian literature =

This article presents a list of the historical events and publications of Australian literature during 1923.

== Books ==
- J. H. M. Abbott – Sydney Cove
- Marie Bjelke Petersen – Jewelled Nights
- Capel Boake — The Romany Mark
- Bernard Cronin – Salvage
- Arthur Gask – The Red Paste Murders
- Mary Gaunt – As the Whirlwind Passeth
- Nat Gould – Beating the Favourite
- D. H. Lawrence – Kangaroo
- Jack McLaren – Fagaloa's Daughter
- Catherine Martin – The Incredible Journey

== Short stories ==
- Henry Lawson – "Elder Man's Lane : XV : The Passing of Elder Man's Lane"

== Children's and Young Adult fiction ==
- Mary Grant Bruce
  - The Cousin from Town
  - The Twins of Emu Plains
- Jean Curlewis – Beach Beyond
- May Gibbs – Nuttybub and Nittersing

== Poetry ==
- Emily Bulcock – Jacaranda Blooms and Other Poems
- Mabel Forrest – "The Burning"
- Mary Gilmore – "Second-Hand Beds"
- Jack Lindsay
  - "Budding Spring"
  - "Pacific Aphrodite"
- Dorothea Mackellar
  - Dreamharbour and Other Verses
  - "Fancy Dress"
  - "Waste"
- Furnley Maurice – "The Mad Prophet"
- Jack Moses – "Nine Miles From Gundagai"
- John Shaw Neilson – Ballad and Lyrical Poems
- Will H. Ogilvie – Scattered Scarlet
- Kenneth Slessor
  - "Adventure Bay"
  - "Thieves' Kitchen"

== Drama ==
- Katharine Susannah Prichard – The Pioneers

== Non-fiction ==
- Walter Murdoch – Alfred Deakin: A Sketch

== Births ==
- 28 January – Percy Trezise, children's writer (died 2005)
- 25 April – Eric Rolls, writer (died 2007)
- 21 May – Dorothy Hewett, poet and novelist (died 2002)
- 4 June – Elizabeth Jolley, novelist (born in England) (died 2007)
- 1 August – Carter Brown, novelist (died 1985)
- 30 August – Charmian Clift, novelist (died 1969)
- 4 October – Bill Scott, poet and children's writer (died 2005)
- 7 September – Nancy Keesing, poet (died 1993)
- 16 December – Gerald Glaskin, writer (died 2000)

== Deaths ==
- 2 June – Edmund James Banfield, writer and naturalist (born 1852 in England)
- 5 November – Dowell O'Reilly, poet (born 1865)
- 15 December – Frank Morton, poet and journalist (born 1869)

== See also ==
- 1923 in Australia
- 1923 in literature
- 1923 in poetry
- List of years in Australian literature
- List of years in literature
