= Nine Miles From Gundagai =

Poem by Jack Moses

- by Jack Moses
- Country: Australia
- Language: English
- Publication date: 1923
- Lines: 32

Full text
- Nine Miles From Gundagai at Wikisource

"Nine Miles From Gundagai" is a poem by Australian poet Jack Moses.

It was first published in the poet's collection of poetry and stories Beyond the City Gates : Australian Story and Verse in 1923, and later in a number of other Australian poetry anthologies.

== Outline ==
The poet relates the story of his dog who sat on the tucker box nine miles outside the New South Wales town of Gundagai to guard its contents.

== Further publications ==
After its initial publication in the Beyond the City Gates : Australian Story and Verse collection in 1923, the poem was reprinted as follows:

- The North Queensland Register 14 January 1924
- Australian Bush Songs and Ballads edited by Will Lawson, Frank Johnson, 1944
- An Anthology of Australian Verse edited by George Mackaness, Angus & Robertson, 1952
- Favourite Australian Poems edited by Ian Mudie, Rigby, 1963
- Silence Into Song : An Anthology of Australian Verse edited by Clifford O'Brien, Rigby, 1968
- The Illustrated Treasury of Australian Verse edited by Beatrice Davis, Nelson, 1984
- A Treasury of Bush Verse edited by G. A. Wilkes, Angus and Robertson, 1991
- Little Book of Dogs compiled by Maree Bentley and Jo Karmel, National Library of Australia, 2008
- 100 Australian Poems You Need to Know edited by Jamie Grant, Hardie Grant, 2008
- The ABC Book of Australian Poetry: A Treasury of Poems for Young Children edited by Libby Hathorn, ABC Books, 2010

== Note ==
The original tale of the "dog on the tuckerbox" dates to a doggerel poem, "Bullocky Bill", published anonymously by "Bowyang Yorke" in 1857. In that poem the distance to Gundagai is given as "five Miles" but Moses reportedly changed the distance to "nine miles" as he believed it had "more music in it."

== See also ==
- 1923 in poetry
- 1923 in literature
- 1923 in Australian literature
- Australian literature
