= A Late Picking: Poems 1965–1974 =

Poetry collection by A. D. Hope

- Author: A. D. Hope
- Language: English
- Publisher: Angus and Robertson
- Publication date: 1975
- Publication place: Australia
- Media type: Print (Hardback)
- Pages: 94 pp
- ISBN: 0207132801
- Preceded by: Selected Poems
- Followed by: A Book of Answers

A Late Picking: Poems 1965–1974 is the collection of poems by Australian poet A. D. Hope. It was published in hardback by Angus and Robertson in Sydney in 1975.

The anthology includes 39 poems by the author.

== Contents ==
- "On an Early Photograph of My Mother"
- "A Letter to David Campbell on the Birthday of W.B. Yeats, 1965"
- "Patch and Mend"
- "Poor Charley's Dream"
- "Croesus and Lais"
- "Pervigilium Veneris"
- "Apollo and Daphne: I"
- "A Windy Afternoon"
- "Exercise on a Sphere"
- "The Sacred Way"
- "Clover Honey"
- "Zion's Children"
- "Dialogue"
- "Winterreise"
- "The Countess of Pembroke's Dream: The Countess of Pembroke's Dream"
- "The Countess of Pembroke's Dream: The Dream"
- "The Countess of Pembroke's Dream: The Dream Within the Dream"
- "What the Serpent Really Said"
- "The Invaders"
- "Under Sedation"
- "Parabola"
- "Gauguin's Menhir, Tahiti"
- "Speak, Parrot!"
- "Adam Ben Googol"
- "Nu Nubile"
- "Palingenesia"
- "Hay Fever"
- "Country Places : Hell, Hay and Booligal!"
- "Under the Weather"
- "O Be A Fine Girl..."
- "The Mystic Marriage of St. Catherine of Alexandria"
- "Apollo and Daphne, II"
- "The First-born"
- "Mokraya Kuritsa"
- "Tiger Thoughts"
- "In Memoriam: Osip Mandelstam, December 1938"
- "The Wild Bees: Potnia, Thesmophore, Chrysanion..."
- "In Memoriam: Gertrud Kolmar, 1943"
- "Spatlese"

== Critical reception ==
Geoff Page writing in The Canberra Times noted that the collection "in general confirms long-held impressions of Hope: the dry detached amusement, the steady quatrains, 'the long isolation of the heart', the erudition (both scientific and literary), the old man still savouring sensual joys. A few poems set you back slightly. They're still Hope but in genres you wouldn't have thought his temperament would come to: for example, 'Hay Fever', (a kind of carpe diem poem which almost becomes a pastoral lyric); an elegy for Osip Mandelstam (an artist one would not have thought much to Hope's Augustan tastes); 'Winterreise' (a straight medieval lyric) or 'Dialogue' (a placid accepting love poem in no way touched with either irony or sexual energy)."

== Publication history ==
The poetry collection was also published by Wentworth Press in a limited edition of 60 copies.

== Awards ==
The collection won both 1976 The Age Book of the Year awards for Best Fiction and Best Book of the Year.

== Notes ==
The full text of the collection is available on the Poetry Library website.

== See also ==
- 1975 in poetry
- 1975 in Australian literature
