= Prize-Giving =

1959 poem by Gwen Harwood

- by Gwen Harwood
- First published in: Meanjin, vol. 18 no. 4 December 1959
- Country: Australia
- Language: English
- Series: Professor Eisenbart
- Published in English: 1959

"Prize-Giving" is a 1959 poem by Australian author Gwen Harwood.

It was first published in Meanjin, vol. 18 no. 4 December 1959, and was subsequently reprinted in the author's collections and other poetry anthologies.

The poem forms part of the author's "Professor Eisenbart" series of poems. This professor "has been interpreted as a 'mask' though which the poet expresses certain anarchic or anti-Establishment views and as a persona which allows her to reflect ironically on the human condition."

== Synopsis ==
The poem is set at a prize-giving ceremony at a prestigious girls' school. A number of dignitaries have been invited to present the awards and make speeches; Professor Eisenbart among them.

== Critical reception ==
In his book Reading Australian Poetry Andrew Taylor noted that this poem, like others in the Eisenbart sequence, is largely, a poem of "reversal". Here the "'honoured guest' who has come 'to lend distinction' to a school prizegiving recognizes himself in the poem's final stanza as 'a sage fool'. Age, scholarly excellence, science, maleness — all qualities in Eisenbart's world and, it appears, in the girls' school too, are held to be preeminient – are subverted by youth, intuitive brilliance, art, that is, music, femaleness."

== Publication history ==
After the poem's initial publication in Meanjin it was reprinted as follows:

- Verse in Australia Vol 3, edited by Robert Clark, Geoffrey Dutton and Max Harris, 1960
- Australian Poetry 1960 edited by A. D. Hope, Angus and Robertson, 1960
- Poems by Gwen Harwood, Angus and Robertson, 1963
- Modern Australian Verse edited by Douglas Stewart, Angus and Robertson, 1964
- Australian Writing Today edited by Charles Higham, Penguin, 1968
- A Book of Australian Verse edited by Judith Wright, Oxford University Press, 1968
- Australian Voices : A Collection of Poetry and Pictures edited by Edward Kynaston, Penguin, 1974
- Selected Poems by Gwen Harwood, Angus and Robertson, 1975
- The Collins Book of Australian Poetry edited by Rodney Hall, Collins, 1981
- The Faber Book of Modern Australian Verse edited by Vincent Buckley, Faber, 1991
- The Sting in the Wattle : Australian Satirical Verse edited by Philip Neilsen, University of Queensland Press, 1993
- Bridgings : Readings in Australian Women's Poetry edited by Rose Lucas and Lyn McCredden, Oxford University Press, 1996
- 50 Years of Queensland Poetry : 1940s to 1990s edited by Philip Neilsen and Helen Horton, Central Queensland University Press, 1998
- Selected Poems : A New Edition by Gwen Harwood, Angus and Robertson, 2001
- Mappings of the Plane : New Selected Poems by Gwen Harwood, edited by Gregory Kratzmann and Chris Wallace-Crabbe, Fyfield Books, 2009
- The Best 100 Poems of Gwen Harwood, Black Inc., 2014

== Notes ==
- You can read the full text of the poem in Bridgings : Readings in Australian Women's Poetry edited by Rose Lucas and Lyn McCredden, Oxford University Press, 1996, on the Internet Archive

== See also ==
- 1959 in Australian literature
