= The Big Black Mark =

1975 novel by Australian writer A. Bertram Chandler

- Author: A. Bertram Chandler
- Language: English
- Series: The Rim Worlds
- Genre: Science fiction
- Publisher: Daw Books
- Publication date: 1975
- Publication place: Australia
- Media type: Print
- Pages: 224 pp.

The Big Black Mark (1975) is a science fiction novel by Australian writer A. Bertram Chandler. It forms part of the author's Rim World series, featuring the recurring character, John Grimes.

It was originally published by Daw Books in USA in 1975.

== Synopsis ==
Captain John Grimes is placed in command of the Census spaceship Discovery. This is crewed by a company of malcontents who have been placed together on this vessel in an attempt to keep them out of trouble. Unfortunately, hope is dashed when they mutiny against Grimes's command and cast him adrift in space.

== Dedication ==
- "To William Bligh."

== Critical reception ==
Spider Robinson, reviewing the novel on its original release in Galaxy magazine noted: "Black Mark borrows just a bit too heavily from both Nordhoff & Hall and Herman Wouk, if you get my galactic drift. True-blue Grimes fans should be satisfied, but I found it pat in spots, contrived in others, and a little too reminiscent of some of the worst Star Trek episodes."

== Publication history ==
After its original publication in 1975 in the US by publishers Daw Books the novel was later published as follows:

- Daw Books reprint 1978, 1982
- Baen Books, USA, 2007 (ebook)
- Orion Books, UK, 2015 (ebook)

The novel was also included in the following compilations of Chandler's work:

- John Grimes: Survey Captain, Science Fiction Book Club, 2002
- First Command, Baen Books, 2011

It was translated into German in 1984.

== Awards ==
- The novel won the Australian Sf Achievement Award for Best Novel in 1976.

== See also ==
- 1975 in Australian literature

== Notes ==
- Chandler wrote about why he felt the book had to be written in an article published in Philosophical Gas 27 (March 1974), edited by John Bangsund.
