= Poor Fellow My Country =

1975 novel by Xavier Herbert

- First edition
- Author: Xavier Herbert
- Cover artist: Ray Crooke
- Language: English
- Genre: Novel
- Publisher: Collins (Australia)
- Publication date: 1975
- Publication place: Australia
- Media type: Print (Hardback & Paperback)
- Pages: 1463
- ISBN: 0-00-616029-8
- OCLC: 27490485
- Preceded by: Capricornia

Poor Fellow My Country is a Miles Franklin Award-winning novel by Australian author Xavier Herbert. At 1,463 pages, it is the longest Australian work of fiction ever written, and the longest single-volume novel to have been written in the English language. Poor Fellow My Country won the 1976 Miles Franklin Literary Award (for books published in 1975), Australia's most prestigious such award. It was Herbert's final novel.

== Plot summary ==
The novel takes place between 1936 and 1942, with a brief epilogue set in 1974, and is set primarily in Australia's Northern Territory. Three social outcasts - Prindy, a half-Indigenous boy; Jeremy, his white grandfather, well-known for his outspoken rants against bigotry and conservatism; and Rifkah, a female Jewish refugee from Nazi Germany - find themselves facing oppression as Australia faces a war and ongoing questions about its place in the world.

=== Book One: Terra Australis ===
Subtitle: "Blackman's Idyll Despoiled by White Bullies, Thieves, and Hypocrites"

1936. Jeremy Delacy is a middle-aged Anglo-Australian who owns a property, Lily Lagoons, in the Northern Territory. Jeremy is an outspoken critic of Australian government and culture. His views often set him apart from his fellow white Australians, especially on the subject of Australian nationalism, as he rejects Australia's fealty to the British Empire, and on the subject of the treatment of Aboriginal Australians.

Jeremy supports land rights and reparations to Aboriginal Australians, as he believes that it is morally and culturally wrong to expect them to integrate with white society and be reliant on welfare and a culture that is not their own. Jeremy's first wife, Rhoda, and his adult sons are pillars of society in the fictional town of Beatrice, modelled on towns such as Katherine. Jeremy's second wife, Nanago, is Indigenous, and they live a life largely separated from society.

Jeremy has a grandson, Prindy, on the cusp of adolescence, whose mother is Indigenous and whose father is Jeremy's son, Martin. Prindy is technically a ward of the state, like all Aboriginal Australians, and is torn between his two cultures. Prindy is not fully accepted by white society, although because of his light skin and his unusual musical abilities he is often seen as a figure of fascination by white people. At the same time, because he has a white father and has not been raised in Aboriginal culture, he is disconnected from this world also.

One of the elders of Prindy's tribe, Bobwirridirridi (known as the Pookarakka), takes the boy to initiate him properly into the tribe. But Prindy's mother Nell and her Chinese husband, who believe that white culture is superior for the boy, pursue them into the bush. In the confrontation, Nell's husband is killed and Bobwirridirridi is arrested for the crime. As a result, Nell is placed into an institution for Indigenous women. Prindy is taken by the state and relocated to Port Palmerston, a fictional version of Darwin. Jeremy causes a scene at Bobwirridirridi's trial, complaining that the trial is a farce given that the defendant doesn't speak fluent English and has not been provided with an interpreter.

In Palmerston, Prindy bonds with his new schoolmistress, Mrs Alfrieda "Alfie" Candlemas, although her progressive views on Aboriginal education see her trade blows with many of the locals. Jeremy joins forces with Alfie and her husband Frank to embarrass Lady Rhoda and the other members of conservative white society. Alfie is attracted to Jeremy, and one night she stays at Lily Lagoons with the intention of seducing him. Jeremy rejects her, and it becomes clear that - despite her progressive views - Alfie still regards Indigenous people, such as Jeremy's second wife Nanago, as inferior. Ultimately Alfie leaves the Territory to go back to Sydney, convinced that integration of Aboriginal people has to be the goal, rather than the self-determination which Jeremy believes in.

Nell escapes her institution and finds Prindy. The two plan to get back to Jeremy, with the help of two other Indigenous people, Queeny and "King George", and they undergo a lengthy and dangerous journey. En route, the women realise they have been betrayed by King George. He plans to take Prindy to a secret location in the bush to continue the initiation process. As this is "men's business", the women are not permitted to be involved. Nell and Queeny do not want Prindy to be initiated into the tribe, as they want him to have the chance of a life in white society, and they track the men. In a violent confrontation, all three adults die, and Prindy wanders alone until he is rescued by an Indian travelling salesman, Ali Barbu, whose young daughter Savitra quickly falls for the boy.

=== Book Two: Australia Felix ===
Subtitle: "Whiteman's Ideal Sold Out by Rogues and Fools"

1938. Prindy is pursued several times by police sergeant Dinny Cahoon and Eddy McCusky, administrator of the Aboriginal people, both of whom have their own patronising views of the boy's future. He finally ends up in Jeremy's care. Australia agrees to take in thousands of Jewish refugees from Nazi Germany and two of them, Dr. Kurt Hoff and Rebecca "Rifkah" Rosen arrive in Beatrice. They claim to be there as part of the plan to build a Jewish State in Australia.

The pair have suffered horrors at the hands of the Nazis, including forced sterilisation, and Rifkah especially finds herself in love with the Australian landscape and the Aboriginal people. Several men in town, including Jeremy, are forcefully attracted to Rifkah, however she rejects them all, in part because she is sterile and believes that any husband will eventually want children. Rifkah remains at Lily Lagoons where she develops a close relationship with Prindy and Nanago.

Alfie comes to visit Lily Lagoons. She has joined a group of Australians called the Free Australia Party (based on the real-life Australia First Movement) who are nationalists who also believe in the White Australia policy and are strongly antisemitic. Alfie claims to have proof that Kurt and Rifkah are actually members of the Communist Party in Australia to recruit members. Kurt confesses to Jeremy that this is true, and Jeremy's connections smuggle Kurt out of the country to save him. Concerned that Rifkah will be deported, Jeremy's son Clancy plots to marry her, thus giving her Australian citizenship. She explains to Clancy that she does not want to marry him but, one night, a drunken Clancy attempts to rape Rifkah and she flees. She finds herself in open water, being attacked by sharks, and is saved by Father Stephen Glascock, the minister at a mission for Aboriginal Australians on Leopold Island. Robert Menzies becomes Prime Minister of Australia and Aboriginal policy changes. There is now greater fear Prindy will be taken by the state again, so Jeremy arranges to transport him to the island mission also, where the boy and Rifkah can live discreetly out of the public eye.

Jeremy heads to Sydney, at Alfie and Frank's invitation, where he is introduced to the men who run the Free Australia Party. The party is a mix of communists and fascists, who believe strongly in the supremacy of white Australians. Despite claiming to be supporters of Jeremy's outspoken views, many of the members are openly racist when they learn that his wife is Indigenous. At a party meeting, Jeremy is invited to speak only to cause uproar by claiming that the movement is fatally flawed. He argues that the movement is racist and conflicted with itself, and that the true Australian spirit has been lost, comparing the group's tactics to Nazism. He argues that the party needs to focus less on bigotry and more on getting seats in government to bring about real positive change. Jeremy is attacked by the mob. This attack is captured in the media but misinterpreted to make Jeremy look like a Nazi sympathiser who was attacked by Australian patriots.

Returning home to the Territory, Jeremy spends a night in the bush where he has a strange experience with a seeming hallucination of a black man. Jeremy seeks advice from a local donkey trader, Billy Brew, who advises that this may have been an old Aboriginal tradition from the area of a person's "second shade", which follows the person through life. Billy Brew suggests that if Jeremy his second shade, he is truly an Australian.

=== Book Three: Day of Shame ===
Subtitle: "A Rabble Fled the Test of Nationhood"

World War II begins. Jeremy is dragooned into the military by his old British friend, General Mark Esk, and journeys to Melbourne at the General's request. Esk and Jeremy want to increase Australia's focus on the Asia-Pacific theatre of the war, as they both believe that Menzies has committed the country's troops primarily to fighting in Europe, whose consequences for Australia will be far less dire than the actions of Japan and its allies. However during drinks at the officer's mess, Jeremy meets a General who commanded his brother during the Gallipoli campaign in World War I. Jeremy's brother was killed, and officers agreed that this general was a tyrant who did not care for his men. Jeremy causes such a scene that he is forcibly removed from the army. Esk - who vouched for Jeremy - is sent back to Europe, and dies in combat.

In Sydney, Jeremy finds that Alfie is pregnant (with his baby, from his previous visit) and is writing an anti-British propaganda novel, in which loyal Australians bomb the RMS Queen Mary in Sydney Harbour, leading to an uprising in which Australia secedes from the British Empire and the War. At a military parade, Jeremy and Alfie cause a scene and they are brutally beaten by a mob of Australians. Alfie loses her baby and Jeremy is severely injured. He wakes up in hospital with gangrenous testicles, but manages to convince the doctor not to amputate them, and he manages to recover. The pair are put on trial for treason. Their lawyer argues successfully that the pair were only misguided. He manages to claim that Alfie's unfinished book - which is the key piece of evidence - was going to end with the rebels being defeated.

Jeremy returns home. In late 1941, Australia's new prime minister, John Curtin, declares the entire Northern portion of the continent to be a Combat Zone, which is to be fought and ceded to the Japanese if necessary during an invasion, so as to protect the rest of the country. All white people are required to move to southern cities, while all Aboriginal people will be rounded up and taken to camps in the bush to keep them safe. Jeremy and Nanago, outraged by this, go separately into hiding in the bush, rather than retreat south.

Rifkah, Prindy, and the Indian girl Savitra, are supposed to have been evacuated also, but Father Glascock agrees to hide them at the Mission. During this time, Prindy and Savitra - now teenagers - declare themselves engaged and become sexually active. Rifkah and Father Glascock fall in love also, although they manage to keep it a secret from everyone except a jealous young lay-preacher, David. He wants Rifkah for himself and, when he is rejected, betrays her to the government. The three refugees are captured on board a ship and taken back to Port Palmerston.

Just as the ship is pulling in, the town is the victim of an air-raid by Japanese forces. Numerous characters are killed, and the survivors either flee town on tightly-packed trains or resort to rioting and looting. The prisoners in the jail are freed, and Prindy is at last reunited with Bobwirridirridi. The two of them, along with Savitra and Rifkah are rescued by train driver Pat Hannaford, who gets them out on the final train under cover of darkness.

The group are reunited with Jeremy in the bush, and are soon joined by Alfie Candlemas and Fergus Ferris, an anthropologist and pilot who has proven a loyal ally to Jeremy. Alfie has fled Sydney, where she was going to be interned as an enemy of the state, and plans on travelling to Portuguese Timor where she will make radio broadcasts back to Australia, trying to convince people that their views on the war are wrong. Alfie's antisemitic views have intensified, and she is immensely hostile to Rifkah. During a trip to the coast, to be reunited with Father Glascock, the group come across Japanese forces again. Glascock is captured, and Alfie and Fergus engage in an aerial battle with a Japanese seaplane. However their plane blows up during the confrontation, and both are killed.

While exploring, Savitra and Prindy come across a group of Aboriginal men conducting secret business. They reject Prindy because he is with his wife. Jeremy attempts to convince the teenagers that they need to be careful. Since Savitra is a woman, she cannot view these rituals, and since she is not Indigenous she will not be entirely trusted by Prindy's people. One night, Bobwirridirridi takes Prindy into the bush, to finally conduct the initiation rituals with members of the tribe. Prindy undergoes a number of trials, including circumcision. Savitra has not listened to advice, and she follows him. She is captured by the members of the tribe and brutally killed as punishment. When the girl does not come back to camp, Jeremy follows. He meets Bobwirridirridi, who tells him not to interfere in Indigenous business. Despite his own professed beliefs in self-determination, Jeremy cannot stop himself from intervening. He arrives at the ritual as Prindy is being attacked by spears and having to fight them off with a boomerang. Jeremy's arrival distracts Prindy, who misses one of the spears and is killed. Jeremy chases the Aboriginal men with his rifle and is ultimately speared by Bobwirridirridi. The two men take Prindy's body to a cave, where Jeremy also dies. Rifkah is the only survivor left, and she joins a nomadic Aboriginal tribe to survive until she is finally reunited with Nanago, and both women survive the war.

In an epilogue set in 1974, we learn that after the War, much of the area was bought by corporations and mining trusts, or used for military purposes by the Americans. Although Indigenous Australians are given citizenship and welfare, they continue to be treated as second class citizens. Rifkah ends up marrying Pat Hannaford, who has lost an arm, a leg, and an eye in the War, so she can retain Australian citizenship. They become an outspoken pair on the fringes of society.

During a visit by Prince Charles to the area, where he is speaking about conservation, Rifkah raises the issue of Indigenous Australians, and asserts that the only way for them to save their culture is to be given amounts of good land for them to own without qualifications. The Prince is willing to listen, but the mob is angry, and they attack Pat, pushing him into the flooding river. No-one will help him, so Rifkah jumps in after him. Both of them appear to drown, but not before Rifkah notices a formation in the water which looks like Prindy's face.

== Composition ==
Herbert conceived of the novel as early as 1936 and - after the publication of his first novel, Capricornia (1938) - he applied for a grant from the Commonwealth Literary Fund to write his new novel, then titled Yellow Fellow. By 1940 Herbert was struggling to make progress and Herbert continued with his career, publishing two further novels and an autobiography.

In 1964, Herbert returned to the abandoned draft. He drew extensively on his own life experiences and those of interesting people he had met around Australia, especially in the Northern Territory. Herbert's interest was in portraying the stories of disadvantaged and displaced people, with an especial interest in Aboriginal Australians. His first book, Capricornia, had been deliberately released in the same year (1938) as the country's sesquicentenary, when Aboriginal groups in New South Wales held the first Day of Mourning in protest at colonialism and racist policies by the Australian government.

By the 1960s, as Herbert wrote Poor Fellow My Country, Aboriginal rights were a key topic in Australia, with a 1967 referendum receiving 90.77% of the vote in favour of recognising Aboriginal Australians in the country's population (they had been excluded in the Constitution of Australia) and raise the expectations of the country as to the welfare of Aboriginal Australians. Herbert intended his novel to be a key statement on contemporary Australian politics.

The novel was completed, except for the epilogue, by Boxing Day 1973.

== Publication ==
Herbert refused to commit to a publisher while writing the novel, enjoying being courted by the major Australian publishing houses. Among those considered were Angus & Robertson, represented by his longtime friend and literary advisor Beatrice Deloitte Davis, whom he rejected due to growing animosity over their usage of the copyright for his earlier novels, and the University of Queensland Press, represented by Craig Munro, whom he rejected when Munro gave him honest feedback including suggesting the novel be published in three volumes due to its size.

In July 1974, Herbert signed a contract with William Collins, Sons. The publication process ran into some troubles when a Jewish project manager, Alan Rein, attempted to point out some inaccuracies with the scenes of Jewish life in the novel, to which Herbert - not Jewish himself - took exception.

By the time of the novel's publication, the Australia Council for the Arts had been founded, with rapidly increasing amounts of funding available for Australian artists and writers. On the strength of Herbert's name, Poor Fellow My Country was awarded over $20,000 in subsidies to assist with typing and printing, allowing the novel to be sold at $20 - a low amount for a book weighing more than 4 pounds and containing 1,463 pages.

On 16 September 1975, the publisher organised a week of festivities in Sydney to celebrate the release of the novel. Herbert and his wife Sadie attended. Herbert was 74 when the novel was published, and it secured his financial security for the remainder of his life.

In 1980, the novel was translated into Japanese by Professor Michio Ochi in 11 volumes, under the title of Kawaisô na watashi no kuni .

== Reception ==
The book sold 30,000 copies within a year of publication and 70,000 within five years, rendering it a success in Australian literary terms. Australian reviewers were mixed but overall positive. The Adelaide Advertiser review was entitled "A Passionate Cry for a Land and a People", while the Courier-Mail called it a "big blockbuster". Historian Manning Clark, in the Canberra Times, titled his review "Artist Turns Angry Prophet".

The Sydney Morning Herald ran two conflicting reviews: one entitled "Compelling Power" and the other "Foaming River of Prose". Much criticism centred on the novel's length, with the reviewer for the Nation Review joking about "poor fellow Xavier Herbert's typewriter".

Reaction to the book was more muted from some of Herbert's fellow writers. Randolph Stow thought that Poor Fellow My Country might be "the Australian classic" but expressed reservations at the character of Jeremy Delacy, who "is a bore on a colossal scale", and whom Stow believed to be a mouthpiece for Herbert's views rather than a character. Patrick White, Australia's only Nobel Literature laureate, admitted privately that, in spite of the "beautiful landscapes", he found it full of "cartoon dialogue and cartoon characters" and would never read the entire novel.

The novel won the 1976 Miles Franklin Award, beating Frank Hardy's But the Dead Are Many and Thomas Keneally's Gossip from the Forest.

== Interpretation ==
Sean Monahan has argued that the book's conclusion serves a double purpose. Despite being the most open-minded white person in the book, Jeremy ultimately cannot leave the Aboriginal people alone at this climactic moment, and his need to "follow the logic of the white man's thinking" and interfere is what causes the tragedy. Prindy, meanwhile, was defined by Herbert as "the symbol of the tragedy of the Australian Dream" and his death symbolises the inevitable failure of the Australian nation unless it finds a better way forward for its Indigenous people.

== See also ==
- A book on Herbert's novels at www.xavier-herbert-novels.com. The book has 5 chapters on Poor Fellow My Country which can either be read on site or downloaded.
- 1975 in Australian literature
