= Panther and Peacock =

1957 poem by Gwen Harwood

- by Gwen Harwood
- Written: 1957
- First published in: Australian Poetry 1957 edited by Hal Porter
- Country: Australia
- Language: English
- Series: Professor Eisenbart
- Published in English: 1957

"Panther and Peacock" is a poem by Australian author Gwen Harwood.

It was first published in Australian Poetry 1957 edited by Hal Porter, and was subsequently reprinted in the author's collections and other poetry anthologies.

The poem forms part of the author's "Professor Eisenbart" series of poems. This professor "has been interpreted as a 'mask' through which the poet expresses certain anarchic or anti-Establishment views and as a persona which allows her to reflect ironically on the human condition."

== Synopsis ==
"Eisenbart is a powerful man, successful in his field, celebrated in the community, yet he is full of rage, anguish, and self-doubt. He likes to see himself as the panther of the poem 'Panther and Peacock', brooding and deadly but cannot rid himself of the fear that he is really the vain and vapid peacock, helpless like everyone else before the 'dark beast' of time and death."

== Critical reception ==
While reviewing Australian Poetry 1957 for The Age newspaper, critic Vincent Buckley wrote the poem "has moments of strength and passion, but is muddled, and, in places, derivative."

In his book Reading Australian Poetry Andrew Taylor commented that the poem is "a particularly dizzying series of reversals and subversions. Power displays itself as vulnerability, civilization as the other side of barbarism or bestiality, conscious intellect as the obverse of unconscious's vertiginous dreams, prise as weakness."

== Publication history ==
After the poem's initial publication in Australian Poetry 1957 it was reprinted as follows:

- Poems by Gwen Harwood, Angus and Robertson, 1963
- Modern Australian Verse edited by Douglas Stewart, Angus and Robertson, 1964
- New Impulses in Australian Poetry edited by Rodney Hall and Thomas Shapcott, University of Queensland Press, 1968
- Australian Literary Studies, vol. 5 no. 3 May 1972
- Selected Poems by Gwen Harwood, Angus and Robertson, 1975
- The Collins Book of Australian Poetry edited by Rodney Hall, Collins, 1981
- Bridgings : Readings in Australian Women's Poetry edited by Rose Lucas and Lyn McCredden, Oxford University Press, 1996
- Selected Poems : A New Edition by Gwen Harwood, Angus and Robertson, 2001

== Notes ==
- You can read the full text of the poem in Bridgings : Readings in Australian Women's Poetry edited by Rose Lucas and Lyn McCredden, Oxford University Press, 1996, on the Internet Archive

== See also ==
- 1957 in Australian literature
