= The North-Bound Rider =

Poetry collection by Ian Mudie

- Author: Ian Mudie
- Language: English
- Genre: poetry
- Publisher: Rigby, Adelaide
- Publication date: 1963
- Publication place: Australia
- Media type: Print
- Pages: 48pp
- Preceded by: The Blue Crane
- Followed by: Look, the Kingfisher

The North-Bound Rider (1963) is the seventh poetry collection by Australian author and poet Ian Mudie. It won the Grace Leven Prize for Poetry in 1963.

The collection consists of 34 poems, with the bulk of them having been previously published in various Australian poetry and literary journals and anthologies.

== Contents ==
- "The North-Bound Rider"
- "The Silent Birds"
- "Summer in the City"
- "Afternoon on the Beach"
- "Girl and Swan"
- "On Reaching the Summit of Horrocks Pass"
- "Relatively Speaking"
- "Six Sixes Are Thirty-Five"
- "Christies Beach"
- "Highway Eight"
- "Dry Spring Paddock"
- "Love is the Black Swan"
- "Ned Kelly Speaks"
- "To Rex Ingamells: December 30, 1955"
- "Wild Flesh his Food"
- "Visitors"
- "Rain: A.D. 2378"
- "Every Man His Own Villain"
- "To an Old Man, Met Long Ago"
- "The Crab or the Tree"
- "Trophy"
- "Seal Rock"
- "Anyway"
- "Sunday in the Garden"
- "How Long is Permanent"
- "I Wouldn't be Lord Mayor"
- "In Neon Pastures"
- "Saturday, June 21"
- "Interstate Driver"
- "Flying Fish"
- "The Anthropologist's Address to His Shovel"
- "Orraparinna"
- "The Cave"
- "Wilderness Theme"

== Critical reception ==
In his review of the poetry collection in Salient : Victoria University Students' Paper Murray Rowlands wrote that in the "best of his poems there is evidence of a maturity that makes even the heaviest cliche get off the ground. This may be linked up with his advocacy of verse speaking and his belief that all poetry should be spoken. His volume runs the gamut of all the Australian images, the vast outback, the beach and memory, the unrealistic city, Ned Kelly, the old farmer, the mildness of Australian winters, the snake, and destructive semi-tropical rain."

== Awards ==
- 1963 - winner Grace Leven Prize for Poetry

== See also ==
- 1963 in poetry
- 1963 in Australian literature
