= A Simple Story (poem) =

1979 poem by Gwen Harwood

- by Gwen Harwood
- First published in: The Tasmanian Review
- Country: Australia
- Language: English
- Publication date: 1 June 1979

"A Simple Story" is a 1979 poem by Australian author Gwen Harwood.

It was first published in The Tasmanian Review on 1 June 1979, and was subsequently reprinted in the author's collections and other poetry anthologies.

The poem forms part of Harwood's poetry sequence A Quartet for Dorothy Hewett.

== Synopsis ==
"A seventeen-year-old girl is a musician encontering another musician, but [in this poem] the seduction is thwarted only because the visiting conductor does not take her work seriously."

== Critical reception ==
In her volume about the author for Oxford University Press Stephanie Trigg noted that "In its sexual politics, the poem resists the easy option of straightforward indignation, and thickens the situation with the girl's willingness to be seduced for art's sake, a rather more complicated attitude to the power games of love."

== Publication history ==
After the poem's initial publication in The Tasmanian Review it was reprinted as follows:

- The Lion's Bride by Gwen Harwood, Angus and Robertson, 1981
- The New Oxford Book of Australian Verse edited by Les Murray, Oxford University Press, 1986
- Two Centuries of Australian Poetry edited by Mark O’Connor, Oxford University Press, 1988
- The Sting in the Wattle : Australian Satirical Verse edited by Philip Neilsen, University of Queensland Press, 1993
- The Oxford Book of Modern Australian Verse edited by Peter Porter, Oxford University Press, 1996
- The Adelaide Review no. 147, January 1996
- The Sydney Review no. 84, February 1996
- Australian Verse : An Oxford Anthology edited by John Leonard, Oxford University Press, 1998
- 50 Years of Queensland Poetry : 1940s to 1990s edited by Philip Neilsen and Helen Horton, Central Queensland University Press, 1998
- A Return to Poetry 2000 edited by Michael Duffy, 2000
- Selected Poems : A New Edition by Gwen Harwood, Angus and Robertson, 2001
- 100 Australian Poems You Need to Know edited by Jamie Grant, Hardie Grant, 2008
- The Puncher & Wattmann Anthology of Australian Poetry edited by John Leonard, Puncher & Wattmann, 2009
- Australian Poetry Since 1788 edited by Geoffrey Lehmann and Robert Gray, University of NSW Press, 2011
- The Best 100 Poems of Gwen Harwood, Black Inc., 2014
- Love is Strong as Death edited by Paul Kelly, Hamish Hamilton, 2019

== Notes ==
- In a piece for The Age newspaper Ann-Marie Priest points out that Harwood based this poem on an incident that happened to her as a seventeen-year-old girl.
- You can read the full text of the poem in The Irish Independent, though the poem is published as one stream, unformatted.

== See also ==
- 1979 in Australian literature
