= Bell-Birds =

1867 poem by Henry Kendall

- by Henry Kendall
- Original title: "Bell Birds"
- First published in: The Sydney Morning Herald
- Country: Australia
- Language: English
- Publication date: 25 November 1867

Full text
- Bell-Birds at Wikisource

"Bell-Birds" is a poem by Australian writer Henry Kendall that was first published in The Sydney Morning Herald on 25 November 1867.

It was later included in the author's poetry collection Leaves from Australian Forests (1869), and was subsequently reprinted in various newspapers, magazines and poetry anthologies (see below).

== Reception ==
The Oxford Companion to Australian Literature states: "Like Wordsworth with his 'sensations sweet', Kendall is sustained by his recollections of natural beauty amid the ugliness of later years in the 'city and alleys'."

== Further publications ==
- "Colonial Monthly: An Australian Magazine", May 1869
- Leaves from Australian Forests by Henry Kendall (1869)
- A Century of Australian Song edited by Douglas Sladen (1888)
- The Oxford Book of Australian Verse edited by Walter Murdoch (1918)
- Selections from Australian Poets edited by Bertram Stevens (1925)
- Selected Poems of Henry Kendall edited by T. Inglis Moore (1957)
- From the Ballads to Brennan edited by T. Inglis Moore (1964)
- Bards in the Wilderness : Australian Colonial Poetry to 1920 edited by Adrian Mitchell and Brian Elliott (1970)
- The Penguin Book of Australian Verse edited by Harry P. Heseltine (1972)
- Australia Fair: Poems and Paintings edited Douglas Stewart (1974)
- A Treasury of Australian Poetry (1982)
- Cross-Country : A Book of Australian Verse edited by John Barnes and Brian MacFarlane, Heinemann, (1988)
- The Illustrated Treasury of Australian Verse edited by Beatrice Davis (1984)
- My Country: Australian Poetry and Short Stories, Two Hundred Years edited by Leonie Kramer (1985)
- The New Oxford Book of Australian Verse edited by Les Murray (1986)
- Favourite Australian Poems (1987)
- The Macmillan Anthology of Australian Literature edited by Ken L. Goodwin and Alan Lawson (1990)
- A Treasury of Bush Verse edited by G. A. Wilkes, Angus and Robertson, 1991
- The Penguin Book of 19th Century Australian Literature edited by Michael Ackland (1993)
- Henry Kendall: Poetry, Prose and Selected Correspondence edited by Michael Ackland (1993)
- An Anthology of Australian Literature edited by Ch'oe Chin-yong and Dynthia Van Den Driesen (1995)
- Classic Australian Verse edited by Maggie Pinkney (2001)
- Our Country: Classic Australian Verse: From the Colonial Ballads to Paterson & Lawson edited by Michael Cook (2004)
- Two Centuries of Australian Poetry edited by Kathrine Bell (2007)
- 100 Australian Poems You Need to Know edited by Jamie Grant, Hardie Grant, 2008
- The Penguin Anthology of Australian Poetry edited by John Kinsella (2009)
- Macquarie PEN Anthology of Australian Literature edited by Nicholas Jose, Kerryn Goldsworthy, Anita Heiss, David McCooey, Peter Minter, Nicole Moore and Elizabeth Webby (2009)

== Trivia ==
- Although the original title of the poem as printed was "Bell Birds", the Austlit catalog lists it as "Bell-Birds", the title as used in subsequent reprints.

== See also ==
- 1867 in poetry
- List of years in Australian literature
- Australian literature
- Bell miner - the bird commonly known as a "bell bird"
