= Poems : Volume Two =

1968 poetry collection by Gwen Harwood

- Author: Gwen Harwood
- Language: English
- Genre: Poetry collection
- Publisher: Angus and Robertson
- Publication date: 1968
- Publication place: Australia
- Media type: Print
- Pages: 71 pp

Poems : Volume Two is a collection of poems by Australian poet Gwen Harwood, published by Angus and Robertson.

The collection contains 47 poems by the author from a variety of sources, including a number of poems which were published under the author's pseudonyms of "Francis Geyer" and "Miriam Stone".

== Contents ==
- "Nightfall"
- "At the Arts Club"
- "Monday"
- "Afternoon"
- "Wind"
- "Hospital Evening"
- "Fever"
- "Ebb-Tide"
- "The Diamond Sparrow"
- "The Farewell"
- "A Magyar Air"
- "Academic Evening"
- "Midnight Mass, Janitzio"
- "All Souls', Janitzio"
- "Landfall"
- "Mid-Ocean"
- "Refugee"
- "All Souls'"
- "Flying Goddess"
- "The Red Leaf"
- "Suburban Sonnet : Boxing Day"
- "Burning Sappho"
- "Suburban Sonnet"
- "Chance Meeting"
- "Early Walk"
- "The Blind Lovers"
- Four Impromptus : To Rex Hobcroft, poetry sequence
  - "I"
  - "II"
  - "III"
  - "IV"
- "In Brisbane"
- "Revival Rally"
- "In the Bistro"
- "Estuary"
- "Dreaming Waking"
- "Past and Present : I"
- "Past and Present : II (to Rex Hobcroft)"
- "A Game of Chess"
- "To Another Poet"
- "Cocktails at Seven"
- "Person to Person"
- "Sonnet"
- "Littoral (To Rex Hobcroft)"
- Variations on a Theme, poetry sequence
- "Alla Siciliana"
- "New Music"
- "To A. D. Hope"

== Critical reception ==
Reviewing the collection for The Bulletin Geoffrey Lehmann noted that the poet "is tremendously impressive at a technical level, she has complete intellectual assurance (but not certainty), and in her poems she is able to create her own poetic world." He concluded his review by stating: "At her best, Gwen Harwood is an original and gifted poet."

In The Sydney Morning Herald Bruce Beaver noted that this collection would only "fortify an already solidy established reputation." He went on to explain that it is the poetry's "innate music and her lucidity of expression that make her art so entertaining and rewarding."

== See also ==
- 1968 in Australian literature
