= In the Park (poem) =

1961 poem by Gwen Harwood

- by Gwen Harwood
- First published in: The Bulletin
- Country: Australia
- Language: English
- Publication date: 8 March 1961
- Lines: 14

"In the Park" is a 1961 poem by Australian author Gwen Harwood.

It was first published in The Bulletin on 8 March 1961 as by "Walter Lehmann", a pseudonym of Harwood's, and was subsequently reprinted in the author's collections and other poetry anthologies. Later publications carried Harwood's name as the author.

== Synopsis ==
An unnamed woman sits in a park with three children playing around her. She is unexpectedly joined by an ex-lover. As they chat about the children she visualises a cartoon-like speech balloon above his head in which is written "...but for the grace of God."

== Critical reception ==
In his book Reading Australian Poetry Andrew Taylor set out to discuss Harwood's "poetry in relation to questions of identity." He decided to use this poem as a starting point. "Suburban monotony and tedium, the niggardly penny-pinching that often comes from having children, the disharmony, the aimlessness: they are all economically conveyed...What we have here is not a muddled poem, but a subtle demonstration of the textuality of identity, its characteristic, if you like, of not being itself."

Writing about the poem's final line ("They have eaten me alive.") Ann-Marie Priest commented: "The sentiment was profoundly challenging for its time. The idea that a woman's children could consume her very being was entirely antithetical to the dominant discourse of motherhood, in which a woman was supposed to find her only true fulfillment in bearing and raising children. Even worse was the suggestion that a mother might resent this unthinking consumption of herself by her offspring."

== Publication history ==
After the poem's initial publication in The Bulletin it was reprinted as follows:

- Poems by Gwen Harwood, Angus and Robertson, 1963
- New Impulses in Australian Poetry edited by Rodney Hall and Thomas Shapcott, University of Queensland Press, 1968
- The Land's Meaning edited by L. M. Hannan and B. A. Breen, Macmillan, 1973
- Selected Poems by Gwen Harwood, Angus and Robertson, 1975
- The Collins Book of Australian Poetry edited by Rodney Hall, Collins, 1981
- Cross-Country : A Book of Australian Verse edited by John Barnes and Brian MacFarlane, Heinemann, 1984
- Two Centuries of Australian Poetry edited by Mark O’Connor, Oxford University Press, 1988
- The Faber Book of Modern Australian Verse edited by Vincent Buckley, Faber, 1991
- The Penguin Book of Modern Australian Poetry edited by John Tranter and Philip Mead, Penguin, 1991
- 50 Years of Queensland Poetry : 1940s to 1990s edited by Philip Neilsen and Helen Horton, Central Queensland University Press, 1998
- Australian Verse : An Oxford Anthology edited by John Leonard, Oxford University Press, 1998
- Selected Poems : A New Edition by Gwen Harwood, Angus and Robertson, 2001
- The Indigo Book of Modern Australian Sonnets edited by Geoff Page, Indigo, 2003
- Motherlode : Australian Women's Poetry 1986 - 2008 edited by Jennifer Harrison and Kate Waterhouse, Puncher and Wattmann, 2009
- Mappings of the Plane : New Selected Poems by Gwen Harwood, edited by Gregory Kratzmann and Chris Wallace-Crabbe, Fyfield Books, 2009
- The Puncher & Wattmann Anthology of Australian Poetry edited by John Leonard, Puncher & Wattmann, 2009
- Australian Poetry Journal, Vol 2 No 1, 2012
- The Best 100 Poems of Gwen Harwood, Black Inc., 2014
- Love is Strong as Death edited by Paul Kelly, Hamish Hamilton, 2019

== See also ==
- 1961 in Australian literature
