= Thomas Caterer =

Australian schoolmaster (1825–1917)

Thomas Caterer (31 July 1825 – c. 4 January 1917) was a pioneer schoolteacher of Adelaide, South Australia who founded in 1862 a private school for boys which in 1866 became Norwood Grammar School.

His brother, Frederick Isaac Caterer (c. 1840 – c. 24 August 1892), founded a similarly influential school in Glenelg.

His eldest son, T. Ainslie Caterer (died 1923), noted cricketer and teacher, was the first student of the University of Adelaide to be awarded a BA.

== Thomas Caterer ==
Thomas was born in Tetsworth, Oxfordshire in 1827, the son of Elizabeth (died at Upper Mitcham, South Australia 17 July 1875) and Isaac Caterer (died 17 March 1868), a schoolteacher who later became a Congregational minister. He was educated at Lewisham College and was for a time on the staff of Taunton's School, Somersetshire before teaching under Professor Newth in Reading, Berkshire. He emigrated to South Australia, arriving in Adelaide 17 December 1854 in the ship Standard He had married Marina Mudie (c. 1830 – 16 March 1899), sister of W. H. Mudie and daughter of the Rev. G. D. Mudie, then of England, but later Congregational minister of Salisbury, South Australia. She followed Thomas to Adelaide in the barque "David Malcolm", arriving 30 April 1855. She was an educated and accomplished woman who had been secretary to Elihu Burritt for some years.

He taught at J. L. Young's Adelaide Educational Institution for three or four years then secured appointments as headmaster at Port Adelaide 1857–1858, Glenelg 1858–1859, Auburn School 1860–1861 and Glen Osmond.

He founded Beaumont Grammar School at his home "Greenhills" at Beaumont in 1862. which moved to Beulah Road, Norwood in April 1866, and renamed the Norwood Grammar School.

In 1883 he was assisting Harry P. Macklin (1856 – 2 August 1902) at the S. A. Commercial College on Osmond Terrace, Norwood then together in 1886 they founded the Semaphore Collegiate School in a building on Ward St, Semaphore where the Rev. James Coglin previously conducted a Church school. On Macklin's death in 1902, he sold the school to John F. Hills and retired in 1904.

He was for two years (around 1880 – 1882) Mayor of the Corporate Town of Kensington and Norwood. He was a fine cricketer and friend of East Torrens team-mate Sir Edwin Smith.

His wife Marina worked closely with Thomas in teaching and school management.

=== T. Ainslie Caterer ===
His eldest son, T. Ainslie Caterer (1858–1923), was a noted cricketer and educator, the first student of the University of Adelaide to be awarded a B.A. He taught at St Peter's College from around 1890 and from 1916 was acting headmaster, and successfully so, until the appointment of the Rev. Bickersteth in 1919. He retired in 1921 and died two years later. He is remembered there by the Caterer Memorial Scholarship. He married Elizabeth Amy Edmunds (1866– ), daughter of Arthur Joseph Edmunds, in 1890

== F. I. Caterer ==
Thomas's younger brother, Frederick Isaac Caterer (c. 1840 – c. 24 August 1892) was born in Peppard, Oxfordshire, and arrived in Adelaide around 1866. For a time he worked for Thomas, but moved to Glenelg and founded the Glenelg Grammar School. on 1 October 1868. Students who achieved a degree of notability included F. C. Howard, E. Jones, Thomas McCallum, C. E. Manthorpe, B. Miller, J. H. Cooke MLC, F. H. Counsell, W. T. Stacy, W. A. Hamilton M.P., H. B. Crosby M.P. and Charles Rischbieth Jury.

In 1869 he married Jane Phillipps (died 1 January 1916), a sister of Herbert Phillipps.

Frederick attended the Glenelg Congregational Church regularly and was a great friend of the pastor, the Rev. C. Manthorpe. He ran the Sunday-school from 1872 to 1883.

He was reported missing on 22 August 1892 and was the subject of an extensive search. He was found dead four days later, having committed suicide by taking poison.

Thomas and Frederick had two sisters: Mercy Anne Caterer (1831 – 25 August 1908), who was married to Rev. W. H. Mudie, and Jessie (died 1925), who never married.
