= William Henry Mudie =

Australian priest (1830–1903)

Rev. William Henry Mudie (1830 – 10 July 1903) was an Anglican priest and educator in Adelaide, South Australia.

== Early years ==
Mudie was born at Chesterfield in Derbyshire where he married Mercy Anne Caterer (1831 – 25 August 1908) shortly before leaving for South Australia on the Coromandel, the couple arriving at Port Adelaide on 8 January 1855.

His father, the Rev G. D. Mudie, of Rochford, Essex and his wife Wedderburn Mudie (née Ainslie) also arrived in Adelaide in 1855. He worked as chaplain at the Yatala stockade, then as minister at the Salisbury Congregational Church.

His sister Marina (1839? – 16 March 1899), who also arrived in 1855, was married to Thomas Caterer, brother of his wife Mercy Anne. Thomas had arrived in Adelaide the previous year, and was established as a schoolteacher. She was a learned and accomplished woman, had been secretary to Elihu Burritt for some years, and worked closely with Thomas in teaching and school management.

His brother, Charles Mayelston Mudie JP. (c. 1833 – 7 August 1880) married Harriet Logie Foulis. He was a medical practitioner in Riverton from 1863 to 1866, Port Adelaide, then Stockport, South Australia from 1867 to 1868, when he was declared insolvent. then Port Pirie.

== Teaching ==
Within a fortnight Mudie had opened a school at Magill. This school was subsequently held at the Glen Osmond Institute from 1861, at "Vansittarts", Beaumont then Tower House, Beaumont and "Urrbrae" (later the home of Peter Waite). Mercy Anne's brother Thomas taught for a time for Mudie; both he and his brother Frederick founded schools of some importance in the early history of South Australia.

== Anglican Church ==
Around 1860 he was approached by Bishop Short, (who was seeking a likely candidate for the clergy), with the result that in 1865 he was ordained as deacon, then in 1868 priest of St Saviour's Church, Glen Osmond, where he was to remain until retiring in 1897 due to ill-health.

Mudie was also deacon of St. Luke's Anglican Church in Whitmore Square from 1865 to 1895. For four years he held weekly services at the Home for Incurables (later Julia Farr Centre) at Fullarton, and from 1883 to 1897 held monthly services at the Parkside Lunatic Asylum (later Glenside Mental Hospital). He was on the building committee for St. Augustine's Church on Unley Road, Unley (designed by R. G. Thomas and completed in 1869), and for a time its rector.

== Other activities ==
To supplement his stipend, he continued his schoolmasterly activities. From 1876 to 1883, when he moved, he conducted classes at "Woodside House", a 15-room home on 20 acres (8.1 ha) irrigated on Fullarton Road, Upper Mitcham. This property was owned by the widow of George Hall, M.L.C. (1811? – 28 January 1867) and later part of Peter Waite's "Urrbrae".

He was for several years President of the Glen Osmond Institute and inaugural vice-president of the Unley Institute in 1883.

His last years were blighted by illness and he died of bronchitis and paralysis. Remarkable for a man of his abilities was his lack of ambition – he never sought higher office and served in the same diocese for over thirty years.

== Family ==
Their family included:

- William Ainslie Mudie (1855 – May 1936) married Justina Emily Ann Fiveash (1855–) on 9 December 1880
- Henry Mayelston "Maley" Mudie (28 March 1857 – 20 February 1933) was the accountant credited with the success of the Savings Bank of South Australia around the beginning of the 20th century and manager from 1919 to 1924. He married Rose Pell Martin (died 10 May 1900) on 28 April 1885. He married Gertrude Mary Wurm (1867 – 19 June 1939). He died after being struck by a car while walking near his home.

- George Dempster Mudie (1895–1971) was town clerk of Hindmarsh
- Ian Mayelston Mudie (1911–1976) was a noted poet.

Note that "Mayelston" is frequently reported as "Mayleston", "Maylestone" or "Mayelstone".
