= Poems (Harwood collection) =

1963 poetry collection by Gwen Harwood

- Author: Gwen Harwood
- Language: English
- Genre: Poetry collection
- Publisher: Angus and Robertson
- Publication date: 1963
- Publication place: Australia
- Media type: Print
- Pages: 99 pp

Poems is the debut collection of poems by Australian poet Gwen Harwood, published by Angus and Robertson, in 1963.

The collection contains 51 poems by the author, including a number of poems which were published under the author's pseudonym of "Walter Lehmann".

This collection is sometimes referred to as Poems [Volume 1], as the author released a second collection in 1968 titled Poems : Volume 2.

== Contents ==
- "Alter Ego"
- "To My Children
- "The Wine is Drunk"
- "In Hospital"
- "At the Water's Edge (to Vivian Smith)"
- "The Wound"
- "Anniversary"
- "Dichterliebe"
- "The Second Life of Lazarus"
- "Of Music"
- "Beethoven, 1798 (to Rex Hobcroft)"
- "Ad Orientem"
- "The Old Wife's Tale"
- "Death of a Painter"
- "The Gardener"
- "The Glass Jar"
- "On Reading Gilbert Ryle's 'The Concept of Mind'"
- "A Postcard"
- "Clair de Lune (Poet to Bluestocking)"
- "Calm Day"
- "Hesperian"
- "Dust to Dust"
- "Giorgio Morandi"
- "Guardian"
- "The Sentry"
- "The Clerk in the Park"
- "Daphne Restored"
- "In Zurich by the Tideless Lake"
- "I Am the Captain of My Soul"
- "Critic's Nightwatch"
- "The Waldstein"
- "A Case"
- "Often I Wake in Darkness"
- "Prizegiving"
- "Early Light"
- "Professor Eisenbart's Evening"
- "Daybreak"
- "Panther and Peacock"
- "Boundary Conditions"
- "Ganymede"
- "Group from Tartarus"
- "Triste, Triste"
- "Flying from Europe"
- "In the Espresso Bar"
- "Home of Mercy"
- "In the Park"
- "In the Hall of Fossils"
- "Memorial Figure"
- "A Kitchen Poem : The Farmer to his Wife"
- "At the Sea's Edge"
- "O Could One Write as One Makes Love"

== Critical reception ==
In a review of several poetry collections in The Bulletin H. P. Heseltine called this volume the best of the group. He went on: "Gwen Harwood is blessed with a further major item in the equipment of a poet: the ability habitually to translate and compress her experience into image and metaphor. Time and time again one is struck by the originality and power with which her language renders feeling and thought. Beneath the lyric melody of the lines, one is made unmistakably aware of a genuine verbal complexity."

Dennis Douglas in The Age newspaper began his review of the book by stating that "Gwen Harwood is a soiphisticated poet writing for a sophisticated audience. She likes to play with ideas and to parody intellectual conversations. She tends to cultivate a slightly recherche diction...Her style can be direct, sensative, fanciful, or incisive, but the surface it presents is always complex, witty, and brilliantly articulate."

== See also ==
- 1963 in Australian literature
