= The Best 100 Poems of Gwen Harwood =

2014 poetry collection by Gwen Harwood

- Author: Gwen Harwood
- Language: English
- Genre: Poetry collection
- Publisher: Black Inc.
- Publication date: November 2014
- Publication place: Australia
- Media type: Print
- Pages: 112 pp
- ISBN: 9781863956987

The Best 100 Poems of Gwen Harwood is a collection of poems by Australian poet Gwen Harwood, published by Black Inc., in 2014, chosen by the author's son John Harwood.

As the title suggests the collection contains 100 poems by the author, including a number of poems which were published under the author's pseudonyms of "Walter Lehmann", "Francis Geyer", and "Miriam Stone".

The collection was reprinted by the same publisher in May 2022.

== Contents ==
- "Alter Ego"
- "Anggur Sudah Diminum"
- "In Hospital"
- "Beethoven, 1798 (to Rex Hobcroft)"
- "The Glass Jar"
- "Home of Mercy"
- "In the Park"
- "A Poem for My Wife"
- "Prize-Giving"
- "Last Meeting"
- "The Double Image : To Rex Hobcroft"
- "The Last Evening"
- "Nightfall" (1961)
- "At the Arts Club"
- "Monday"
- "Wind"
- "Fever"
- "Ebb-Tide"
- "The Diamond Sparrow"
- "Refugee"
- "Burning Sappho"
- "Suburban Sonnet"
- "Chance Meeting"
- "Nightfall" (1963)
- Four Impromptus : To Rex Hobcroft, poetry sequence
  - "I"
  - "II"
  - "III"
  - "IV"
- "In Brisbane"
- "Revival Rally"
- "Dreaming Waking"
- "Past and Present : I"
- "A Game of Chess"
- "To Another Poet"
- "Littoral (To Rex Hobcroft)"
- "Alla Siciliana"
- "New Music"
- "Dust to Dust"
- "An Impromptu for Ann Jennings"
- "Reed Voices"
- "Morning, Oyster Cove (Oyster Cove)"
- "Winter Quarters"
- "Iris"
- "Night Flight"
- "At Mornington (to Thomas Riddell)"
- "The Blue Pagoda"
- "David's Harp"
- "Night Thoughts : Baby and Demon"
- "Fido's Paw is Bleeding"
- ""Thought is Surrounded by a Halo" -"
- Father and Child, poetry sequence
  - "Barn Owl"
  - "Nightfall"
- "The Lion's Bride"
- "A Music Lesson"
- Oyster Cove Pastorals, poetry sequence
  - "To the Muse"
  - "High Noon"
  - "Evening : 'Et in Arcadia Ego'"
- "A Little Night Music"
- "Death Has No Features of His Own"
- "Beyond Metaphor"
- "Evening, Oyster Cove"
- "Return of the Native"
- A Quartet for Dorothy Hewett, poetry sequence
  - "Twilight"
  - "Goose-Girl"
  - "A Simple Story"
  - "Dorothy, Reading in Hobart"
- "Naked Vision"
- "In Plato's Cave"
- "The Secret Life of Frogs"
- ""Mother Who Gave Me Life"
- Class of 1927, poetry sequence
  - "Slate"
  - "The Spelling Prize"
  - "Religious Instruction"
  - "The Twins"
- "Bone Scan"
- "The Night Watch"
- "Morning Again"
- "Blackbird"
- "Visitor"
- "The Sun Descending"
- "Crow-Call"
- "Schrodinger's Cat Preaches to the Mice"
- "Night and Dreams"
- "The Magic Land of Music"
- "Long after Heine"
- "1945"
- "Resurrection"
- "Mid-Channel"
- "Night Thoughts"
- "Midwinter"
- "This Artifice of Air"
- "Herongate"
- "Wittgenstein's Shoebox"
- "Later Texts"
- "The Owl and the Pussycat Baudelaire Rock"
- "Late Works"

== Critical reception ==
Writing in Australian Book Review Ann-Marie Priest noted that "Harwood is very much a poet of memory, and in both late and early works evokes her childhood and youth in vivid narratives." While she also noted the absence of some important Harwood poems she conceded that "with a poet of so many moods, so many voices, so many gifts, any selection calls for hard choices."

Chris Wallace-Crabbe felt he was able to discern the reason behind the book's publication: "Plainly, this book has been planned as a school text from the very start. It seems economically produced; and it contains not one jot or tittle of ancillary information, which could be siphoned into student essays. Above all, two of two most written-on sonnets have been omitted, one being replaced by a rewrite."

In Sydney Review of Books Simon West looked at Harwood's career and commented of this volume: "Perhaps the sales strategy of Black Inc. to have the word 'best' in a number of their titles has its origin in this difficulty. In the case of a selective anthology such as The Best 100 Poems of Gwen Harwood, both the adjective and the magical number have a trace of the ludicrous. One would like to think that Harwood had reached a level of importance where gratuitous boosting was unnecessary."

== See also ==
- 2014 in Australian literature
