= Country Places : Hell, Hay and Booligal! =

1975 poem by Australian poet A. D. Hope

- by A. D. Hope
- Country: Australia
- Language: English
- Publisher: A Late Picking : Poems 1965-1974 by A. D. Hope
- Publication date: 1975
- Lines: 64

"Country Places : Hell, Hay and Booligal!" (1975) is a poem by Australian poet A. D. Hope.

It was originally published in the poet's collection A Late Picking : Poems 1965-1974, and was subsequently reprinted in other collections by the poet as well as a number of Australian poetry anthologies.

The poem is sometimes referred to simply as Country Places, and can be seen as a response to "Banjo" Paterson's 1896 poem "Hay and Hell and Booligal".

== Synopsis ==
This satirical poem makes fun of some Australian place-names, "Weird names, some beautiful, more that make me laugh", while at the same time warning that "my prosperous, my careless country,/She destroys herself".

== Critical reception ==
While reviewing the poet's collection A Late Picking in The Age newspaper reviewer Evan Jones called this work "an old man's poem", before going on to note that it is "so unfailingly winning in its cheery garrulity that it can only be counted a triumph."

Barry Oakley, in The Weekend Australian, commented that, in this poem, Hope "performs elegant variations on Australian place names, in the style of an Old Testament prophet".

== Publication history ==
After the poem's initial publication in A Late Picking : Poems 1965-1974 it was reprinted as follows:

- Australian Verse from 1805 : A Continuum edited by Geoffrey Dutton, Rigby, 1976
- Antechinus : Poems 1975-1980 by A. D. Hope, Angus and Robertson, 1981
- The Penguin Book of Australian Humorous Verse edited by Bill Scott, Penguin, 1984
- My Country : Australian Poetry and Short Stories, Two Hundred Years edited by Leonie Kramer, Lansdowne, 1985
- Contemporary Australian Poetry: An Anthology edited by John Leonard, Houghton Mifflin, 1990
- The Macmillan Anthology of Australian Literature edited by Ken L. Goodwin and Alan Lawson, Macmillan, 1990
- Selected Poems by A. D. Hope, edited by David Brooks, Angus and Robertson, 1992
- A. D. Hope : Selected Poetry and Prose by A. D. Hope, edited by David Brooks, Halstead Press, 2000
- 100 Australian Poems You Need to Know edited by Jamie Grant, Hardie Grant, 2008

== Notes ==
- The full text of the poem is available on the Poetry Library archived website.

== See also ==
- 1975 in Australian literature
- 1975 in poetry
