= Lamplight (poem) =

1980 poem by Gwen Harwood

- by Gwen Harwood
- First published in: Overland No. 82
- Country: Australia
- Language: English
- Publication date: December 1980
- Lines: 36

"Lamplight" is a 1980 poem by Australian author Gwen Harwood. It is also known by the title "Mother Who Gave Me Life".

It was first published in Overland magazine in December 1980, and was subsequently reprinted in the author's collections and other poetry anthologies.

== Synopsis ==
Harwood addresses her late mother directly, lamenting that she did not know her better.

== Critical reception ==
Writing about how Harwood's "view of the sacramental and numinous nature of poetry" impacts her poems, Sarah Golsby-Smith wrote of this poem that "It is, as Harwood herself declares, a heartfelt elegy to her mother. Addressed directly to her mother, across the barrier of time and death, the poem is a celebration of matrilineal heritage and the ways in which language quivers through each generation born of woman...The poem draws strength not from the patrilineal heritage from which she draws her name, but from her mother and the many mothers before her".

In her review of Falling and Flying: Poems on Ageing edited by Judith Beveridge and Susan Ogle, Ali Jane Smith notes that the poet "captures the littleness and bigness of the parent-child relationship in her breathtaking poem".

== Publication history ==
After the poem's initial publication in Overland it was reprinted as follows:

- The Lion's Bride by Gwen Harwood, Angus and Robertson, 1981
- Cross-Country : A Book of Australian Verse edited by John Barnes and Brian MacFarlane, Heinemann, 1984
- Effects of Light : The Poetry of Tasmania edited by Vivian Smith and Margaret Scott, Twelvetrees Publishing, 1985
- Selected Poems by Gwen Harwood, Angus and Robertson, 1985
- My Country : Australian Poetry and Short Stories, Two Hundred Years edited by Leonie Kramer, Lansdowne, 1985
- Selected Poems by Gwen Harwood, Angus and Robertson, 1990
- Contemporary Australian Poetry: An Anthology edited by John Leonard, Houghton Mifflin, 1990
- The Faber Book of Modern Australian Verse edited by Vincent Buckley, Faber, 1991
- The Penguin Book of Modern Australian Poetry edited by John Tranter and Philip Mead, Penguin, 1991
- The Oxford Book of Australian Women's Verse edited by Susan Lever, Oxford University Press, 1995
- Family Ties : Australian Poems of the Family edited by Jennifer Strauss, Oxford University Press, 1998
- Australian Verse : An Oxford Anthology edited by John Leonard, Oxford University Press, 1998
- Selected Poems : A New Edition by Gwen Harwood, Angus and Robertson, 2001
- Two Centuries of Australian Poetry edited by Kathrine Bell, Gary Allen, 2007
- Macquarie PEN Anthology of Australian Literature edited by Nicholas Jose, Kerryn Goldsworthy, Anita Heiss, David McCooey, Peter Minter, Nicole Moore, and Elizabeth Webby, Allen and Unwin, 2009
- Motherlode : Australian Women's Poetry 1986 - 2008 edited by Jennifer Harrison and Kate Waterhouse, Puncher and Wattmann, 2009
- Mappings of the Plane : New Selected Poems by Gwen Harwood, edited by Gregory Kratzmann and Chris Wallace-Crabbe, Fyfield Books, 2009
- Australian Poetry Since 1788 edited by Geoffrey Lehmann and Robert Gray, University of NSW Press, 2011
- The Best 100 Poems of Gwen Harwood, Black Inc., 2014
- Falling and Flying : Poems on Ageing edited by Judith Beveridge and Susan Ogle, Brandl and Schlesinger, 2015

== Notes ==
- You can read the full text of the poem on the Nebo-Lit website.

== See also ==
- 1980 in Australian literature
