= Suburban Sonnet =

Poem by Gwen Harwood

- by Gwen Harwood
- First published in: The Bulletin
- Country: Australia
- Language: English
- Publication date: 1963
- Lines: 14

"Suburban Sonnet" is a poem by Australian poet Gwen Harwood.

It was first published in The Bulletin on 12 January 1963, under the author's pen-name of "Miriam Stone", and later in several of the author's collections and in other Australian poetry anthologies.

== Outline ==
While caring for her children a "suburban housewife" remembers the time when she was a pianist who once played for Rubinstein.

== Analysis ==
While reviewing the poet's Poems: Volume Two collection the reviewer Geoffrey Lehmann commented that "Her poems about bluestockings and critics indicate perhaps an overconsciousness of possible critical reaction." As an example of this analysis he quoted a line from this poem: "Once she played for Rubinstein, who yawned." He went on to say that "Her ingenuity in avoiding obvious phrases is one of the pleasures of her work, but sometimes this makes her poetry excessively cerebral."

In his commentary on the poem in 60 Classic Australian Poems Geoff Page noted there "is a rich vein of 'suburban disillusionment' running through our poetry and [this poem] by Gwen Harwood is its definitive expression.”

== Further publications ==
After its initial publication in The Bulletin magazine in 1963, the poem was reprinted as follows:

- Australian Poetry 1964 edited by Randolph Stow, Angus and Robertson, 1964
- Poems : Volume Two by Gwen Harwood, Angus and Robertson, 1968
- Selected Poems by Gwen Harwood, Angus and Robertson, 1975
- Australian Verse from 1805 : A Continuum edited by Geoffrey Dutton, 1976
- The Wild Girl in the Heart by Robyn Archer, Larrikin Records, 1978
- The Collins Book of Australian Poetry edited by Rodney Hall, Collins, 1981
- Cross-Country : A Book of Australian Verse edited by John Barnes and Brian MacFarlane, Heinemann, 1984
- Selected Poems by Gwen Harwood, Angus and Robertson, 1985
- My Country : Australian Poetry and Short Stories, Two Hundred Years edited by Leonie Kramer, Lansdowne, 1985
- Inner Cities: Australian Women's Memory of Place edited by Drusilla Modjeska, Penguin, 1989
- Selected Poems by Gwen Harwood, Angus and Robertson, 1990
- Selected Poems: A New Edition by Gwen Harwood, Halcyon Press, 2001
- The Indigo Book of Modern Australian Sonnets edited by Geoff Page, Indigo, 2003
- 80 Great Poems from Chaucer to Now edited by Geoff Page, University of NSW Press, 2006
- The Penguin Anthology of Australian Poetry edited by John Kinsella, Penguin, 2009
- 60 Classic Australian Poems edited by Geoff Page, University of NSW Press, 2009
- The Best 100 Poems of Gwen Harwood, Black Inc., 2014
- Australian Book Review June 2022

== See also ==
- 1963 in poetry
- 1963 in literature
- 1963 in Australian literature
- Australian literature
