= Selected Poems (Harwood collection) =

1975 poetry collection by Gwen Harwood

- Author: Gwen Harwood
- Language: English
- Genre: Poetry collection
- Publisher: Angus and Robertson
- Publication date: 1975
- Publication place: Australia
- Media type: Print
- Pages: 111 pp
- Awards: 1975 Grace Leven Prize for Poetry, winner
- ISBN: 0207132097

Selected Poems is a collection of poems by Australian poet Gwen Harwood, published by Angus and Robertson, in 1975.

The collection contains 87 poems by the author, consisting of a selection from Poems (1963) and Poems : Volume Two (1968) as well as 27 new poems.

It was the winner of the 1975 Grace Leven Prize for Poetry.

== Contents ==
- "Alter Ego"
- "The Wine is Drunk"
- "In Hospital"
- "At the Water's Edge (to Vivian Smith)"
- "Anniversary"
- "Dichterliebe"
- "Beethoven, 1798 (to Rex Hobcroft)"
- "The Old Wife's Tale"
- "The Glass Jar"
- "A Postcard"
- "Clair de Lune"
- "Calm Day"
- "Hesperian"
- "Giorgio Morandi"
- "Daphne Restored"
- "In Zurich by the Tideless Lake"
- "I Am the Captain of My Soul"
- "A Case"
- "Often I Wake in Darkness"
- "Triste, Triste"
- "Carpe Diem"
- "Home of Mercy"
- "In the Park"
- "At the Sea's Edge"
- "Prizegiving"
- "Early Light"
- "Professor Eisenbart's Evening"
- "Daybreak"
- "Panther and Peacock"
- "Boundary Conditions"
- "Ganymede"
- "Group from Tartarus"
- "Nightfall" (1961)
- "At the Arts Club"
- "Monday"
- "Afternoon"
- "Wind"
- "Hospital Evening"
- "Fever"
- "Ebb-Tide"
- "Midnight Mass, Janitzio"
- "Refugee"
- "All Souls'"
- "Flying Goddess"
- "Suburban Sonnet"
- "Nightfall" (1963)
- "Impromptu III"
- "Fourth Impromptu ([Impromptu] IV)"
- "Revival Rally"
- "In Brisbane"
- "Estuary"
- "Past and Present : I"
- "Past and Present : II (to Rex Hobcroft)"
- "A Game of Chess"
- "Cocktails at Seven"
- "Littoral"
- "Alla Siciliana"
- "New Music"
- "To A.D. Hope"
- "Dust to Dust"
- "An Impromptu for Ann Jennings"
- "Matinee"
- "Reed Voices"
- "Morning, Oyster Cove"
- "An Old Graveyard"
- "September Snow, Hobart"
- "A Small Victory"
- "A Public Place"
- "Winter Quarters"
- "The Violets"
- "The Carnival of Venice"
- "Iris"
- "The Flight of the Bumble Bee"
- "Night Flight"
- "At Mornington (to Thomas Riddell)"
- "The Blue Pagoda"
- "David's Harp"
- "Carnal Knowledge I"
- "Carnal Knowledge II"
- "Night Thoughts : Baby and Demon"
- "Meditation on Wyatt : I"
- "Meditation on Wyatt : II"
- "Fido's Paw is Bleeding"
- ""Thought is Surrounded by a Halo" -"
- "Barn Owl"
- "Father and Child" poetry sequence
- "Nightfall" (1969)

Note: There are three poems in this collection with the title "Nightfall". These are differentiated in the contents, above, by the addition of a postscript year. This year does not appear in any poem's original title.

== Critical reception ==
Reviewing the collection for The Sydney Morning Herald John Beston commented: "On the whole, Harwood's best work lies in her first volume and in these New Poems. Her first volume impresses one with her powerful intelligence, her conciseness, and her intensity of feeling. As one looks back on her early work from New Poems, one finds in it more warmth than was first apparent; the warmth was merely overshadowed by her sharp intelligence. As she became assured in her second volume, her verse became more fluent but Less concise." He concluded that, while this volume may not look attractive, that should not diminish the poet's work as he belonges with Australian poets such as "Wright, Hope, beaver, and Stow."

== Awards ==
- 1975 Grace Leven Prize for Poetry, winner

== See also ==
- 1975 in Australian literature
