= Capricornia (novel) =

Book by Xavier Herbert

- First UK edition (UK)
- Author: Xavier Herbert
- Genre: Fiction
- Publisher: The Publicist, Sydney
- Publication date: 1938
- Pages: 510
- ISBN: 978-0-207-13304-6
- OCLC: 220213222
- Followed by: Poor Fellow My Country

Capricornia (1938) is the debut novel by Xavier Herbert.

Like his later work considered by many a masterpiece, the Miles Franklin Award-winning Poor Fellow My Country, it provides a fictional account of life in 'Capricornia', a place clearly modelled specifically on Australia's Northern Territory, and to a lesser degree on tropical Australia in general, (i.e. anywhere north of the Tropic of Capricorn) in the early twentieth century. It was written in London between 1930 and 1932.

Highly influenced by the Jindyworobak Movement, it also describes the inter-racial relationships and abuses of the period.

It was written before Herbert was acting Protector of the Aborigines in Darwin.

== Recognition ==
The book won the Australian Literature Society Gold Medal for Australia’s Best Novel of 1939.

Prominent Australian author and historian Geoffrey Dutton included Capricornia in The Australian Collection: Australia’s Greatest Books, describing it as “one of the most energetic of modern novels. And it is a modern novel, despite its straightforward narrative technique and style and being set in the past, with characters whose names recall Bunyan or Dickens. It is modern because it impinges on contemporary consciousness.”

== Stage adaptation ==
Playwright Louis Nowra adapted Capricornia for the stage, first performed by in 1988. Company B Belvoir's production, directed by Kingston Anderson, opened at Sydney's Belvoir St Theatre in April 1988 before a national tour. Belvoir revived Nowra's play in 2006 in a production directed by Wesley Enoch at the Seymour Centre in Sydney.
