= Jack Moses =

Australian poet

- Born: John Moses; 12 January 1861; Haymarket, Sydney, New South Wales, Australia
- Died: 10 July 1945 (aged 84); Sydney, New South Wales, Australia
- Burial place: South Head Cemetery, Sydney
- Occupation(s): Poet, elocutionist, travelling salesman
- Notable work: Nine miles from Gundagai
- Parent: John Moses

Jack Moses (12 January 1861 – 10 July 1945) was an Australian outback bush poet who wrote the poem "The dog sat on the tuckerbox" from which the well-known Dog on the Tuckerbox monument and the Nine and Five Mile legend of Gundagai were inspired.

== Early life ==
Jack Moses was born in Haymarket, New South Wales, 'when cows grazed in Hyde Park'. Of Jewish origins, his grandfather, John Moses, arrived as a convict to Hobart on a seven-year sentence. Eventually, he married an Irish woman named Mary Conolly, before moving to the Colony of New South Wales to become a pastry cook in Parramatta.

His father, also named John, had a grocery store, and Jack would go around with the delivery cart; at Sydney's first Royal Agricultural Show, he sold cigars.

== Professional life ==
Moses became a wine and whisky salesman travelling around Australia. Commencing first with the firm of Frank Bouffier, this followed with thirty years as a Lindeman's representative, and finishing with Leo Buring (the latter two now part of the Treasury Wine Estates company). Travelling was by Cobb & Co coaches, sulkies and trains, before moving to motor car. This career allowed him to develop his reciting of verse.

He became the 'father' of the Country Promotion League, a scheme to advertise the primary resources of many country districts in Sydney.

Moses' poem 'The dog sat on the tuckerbox', which has echoes of a much earlier Bullocky Bill by someone known only as "Bowyang Yorke", was considered by Gundagai Shire Council to be an important advertisement for their historic Australian town, and influenced creation of the famous monument, 'Dog on the tuckerbox', five miles from Gundagai, and a 'Jack Moses Street' in Gundagai was named in his honour. In his publisher's note in Jack Moses' collection of verse "Nine Miles from Gundagai" (1938), the publisher quoted Frank Morton saying in 1923 that he liked Moses' poems as they "dealt with the interests of real Australian bush people in a truthful, non-gloomy manner."

Jack Moses remained a prominent figure in country shows throughout New South Wales and at smoke concerts where he recited his poems and told stories of the bush. Given to be a born reciter, renditions included the works of Edwin Brady, Henry Lawson, Will H. Ogilvie, Roderic Quinn, and Banjo Paterson.

He counted Lawson as a friend for twenty years. After years of championing by Moses, a book of stories about Lawson, Henry Lawson–By his mates by Angus and Robertson, was published in January 1932. Contributing writers included Lawson's daughter Bertha Lawson, John Le Gay Brereton, Roderic Quinn, his brother Patrick Quinn, and W. E. Fitz Henry.

His visits included Cootamundra, Cobar, and Wingham and other North Coast shows.

== Later life ==
He later became an enthusiastic all-year swimmer at Bondi as a founding member of the Bondi Icebergs Club. Aged 82, when asked 'What do you regard as most responsible for your great age, Jack?', Moses responded 'I'll tell you, sonny, I never go in!'.

He married Lucy Florence Nightingale in Ashfield, Sydney, on 18 June 1900. The daughter of a bridge contractor, she died aged 53 on Saturday, 3 September 1932, at her residence of 'Mirrabooka', New South Head Road, Vaucluse, and was buried at the South Head Cemetery.

In his later years, Moses lived at the Hotel Arcadia in Pitt Street, in Sydney's central business district. A testimonial fundraiser was held in June 1944 for Moses.

On 10 July 1945 aged 84, the 'last of the bush troubadors', Moses died of heart disease at the Royal Prince Alfred Hospital, and was buried at the South Head Cemetery. Managing director W. G. Cousins of Angus and Robertson stated 'Jack Moses was a great barracker for Australia and what it could produce'. He was survived by his son, John Moses.

== Works ==
=== Books ===
- Beyond the City Gates (1923), illustrated by R. H. Moppett. As reviewed by another Australian port Roderic Quinn and fellow Bohemian, '[Moses] ... tells us in prose and verse of many, a pleasant experience met with by him in his wanderings far and wide'.
- Nine Miles From Gundagai, and Other Verses, produced by Angus and Robertson was to be launched by Christmas 1937 but sold from April 1938, containing poems including 'The postage stamp' and 'To Wogga Wog-Gar'. The book was reprinted several times (the fourth reprint was in 1972), and proceeds going to the Australian Red Cross Society.

=== Selected individual poems ===
- "Nine Miles From Gundagai" (1923)
- "Lock the Lachlan" (1923), which led to the creation of the Wyangala Dam and the follow-up 1928 poem 'They're going to lock the Lachlan'.
