= Philip Martin (poet) =

Australian poet

Philip John Talbot Martin (1931–2005) was an Australian academic, poet, translator, critic and broadcaster.

Born in the Melbourne suburb of Richmond, Martin graduated from the University of Melbourne in 1958. He taught English at Monash University from 1964. His poems have been published, anthologised and broadcast both in Australia and overseas.

His poetic output was cut short when he suffered a severe stroke in 1987. He lived through a long period of illness from that time until his death in 2005.

An obituary of Philip Martin written by the Australian poet Kate Llewellyn was published in the Poet's Union magazine Five Bells in its Summer 2005-2006 edition.

== Publications ==
- Voice Unaccompanied: poems (1970)
- Shakespeare's Sonnets: Self, Love and Art (1972)
- A Bone Flute (poems, Australian National University Press, 1974)
- From Sweden: Translations and Poems (1979)
- A Flag for the Wind (poems, Longman Cheshire, 1982)
- New and Selected Poems (poems, Longman Cheshire, 1988)
