= Xavier Herbert =

Australian writer (1901–1984)

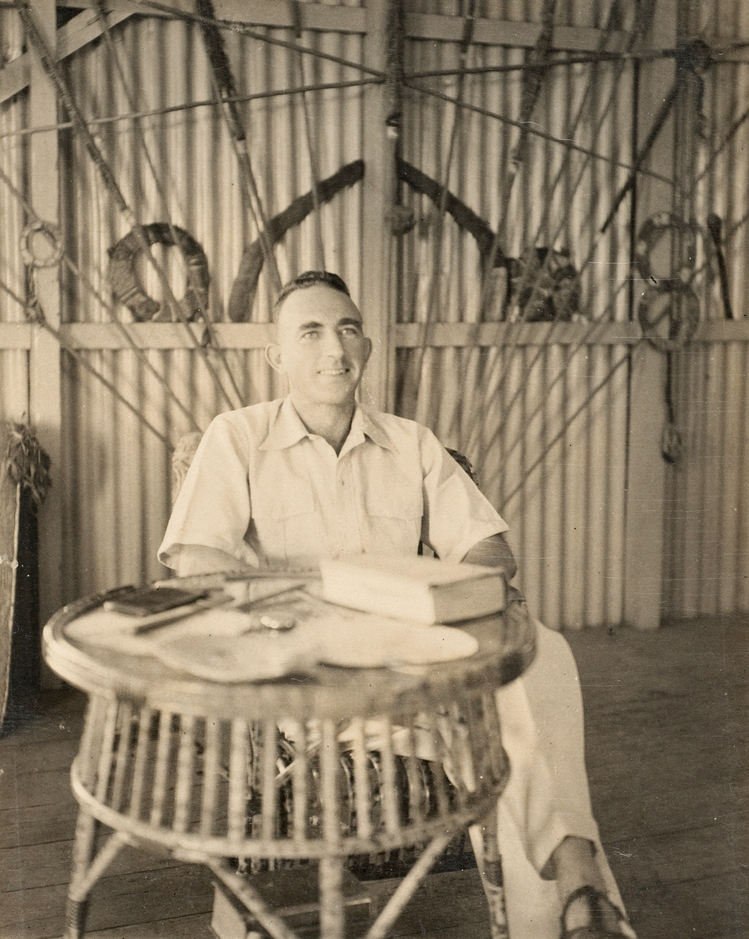
- Herbert on 1 April 1938, the day he received news of winning the Sesquicentenary Library Prize
- Born: Alfred Jackson; 15 May 1901; Geraldton, Western Australia, Australia
- Died: 10 November 1984 (aged 83); Alice Springs, Northern Territory, Australia
- Occupation: Author
- Writing career
- Pen name: Xavier Herbert, E. Norden, Herbert Astor

Xavier Herbert (born Alfred Jackson; 15 May 1901 – 10 November 1984) was an Australian writer best known for his Miles Franklin Award-winning novel Poor Fellow My Country (1975). He was considered one of the elder statesmen of Australian literature. He is also known for short story collections and his autobiography Disturbing Element.

== Life and career ==
Xavier Herbert in 1984

Herbert was born Alfred Jackson in Geraldton, Western Australia, in 1901, the illegitimate son of Amy Victoria Scammell and Benjamin Francis Herbert, a Welsh-born engine driver. He was registered at birth as Alfred Jackson, son of John Jackson, auctioneer, with whom his mother had already had two children. Before writing he worked many jobs in Western Australia and Victoria; his first job was in a pharmacy at the age of fourteen. He studied pharmacy at Perth Technical College and was registered as a pharmacist on 21 May 1923 as Alfred Xavier Herbert. He moved to Melbourne, and in 1935 enrolled at the University of Melbourne to study medicine. He started his writing career writing short stories for the popular magazine and newspaper market, publishing under a range of pseudonyms, the most common being Herbert Astor.

He did not publish his first book, Capricornia, until 1938. Capricornia was in part based on Herbert's experiences as Protector of Aborigines in Darwin, though it was written in London between 1930 and 1932. It won the Australian Literature Society Gold Medal for Australia's Best Novel of 1939.

The 1940s and 1950s were a relatively lean time for Herbert in terms of publication. He released Seven Emus (1959). In the 1960s he published two books, before the release of Poor Fellow My Country (1975), as well as a short story collection. Poor Fellow My Country is the longest Australian novel.

Herbert was well known for his outspoken views on indigenous issues. He was a great champion of Aboriginal peoples, particularly those living in missions in Queensland and the Northern Territory. In his personal life he was considered difficult, and his wife Sadie said it was a choice between having children and looking after Xavier. Aware of his own mythology, he frustrated biographers by telling unreliable stories about his life and past.

In 1977 the artist Ray Crooke painted a Portrait of Xavier Herbert followed in 1980 by a Portrait of Sadie Herbert. Professor Emeritus Laurie Hergenhan discussed the story behind the creation of these artworks, and another portrait by Crooke of Sir Zelman Cowen, in "A Tale of Three Portraits."

== Final years and death ==
By 1982, the widowed Herbert was working on a new novel, "Me and My Shadow" and took a two-month tour of his birth state, Western Australia, in 1983 to gather material for the book. On 15 January 1984, at age 83, he left his home in Redlynch, Queensland for the last time to drive in his Land Rover into the centre of the country, the Northern Territory. He travelled 2,000 km to his destination: Alice Springs. In June 1984, Herbert refused to accept an award of the Order of Australia from the Hawke government, on the grounds that it was a British Empire honour rather than a nationalist Australian one.

In September, Herbert was treated for skin grafts on his leg and carpal tunnel syndrome in Alice Springs, where he was visited by the artist Sidney Nolan and his wife Mary. After his treatment, Herbert moved in temporarily with his doctor, Charles Butcher, and Butcher's family, where he would live for the remaining weeks of his life.

Herbert died on 10 November 1984 from kidney failure. He was commemorated by the Prime Minister, Bob Hawke, as "a prodigiously committed Australian". He was buried in Alice Springs, together with his wife's ashes, in a ceremony officiated by Aboriginal activist Pat Dodson in recognition of Herbert's long support for the rights of Aboriginal Australians.

== Oral history ==
Herbert was interviewed in 1961 and 1975 about his life and career. The recordings can be found at the National Library of Australia.

== Published works ==
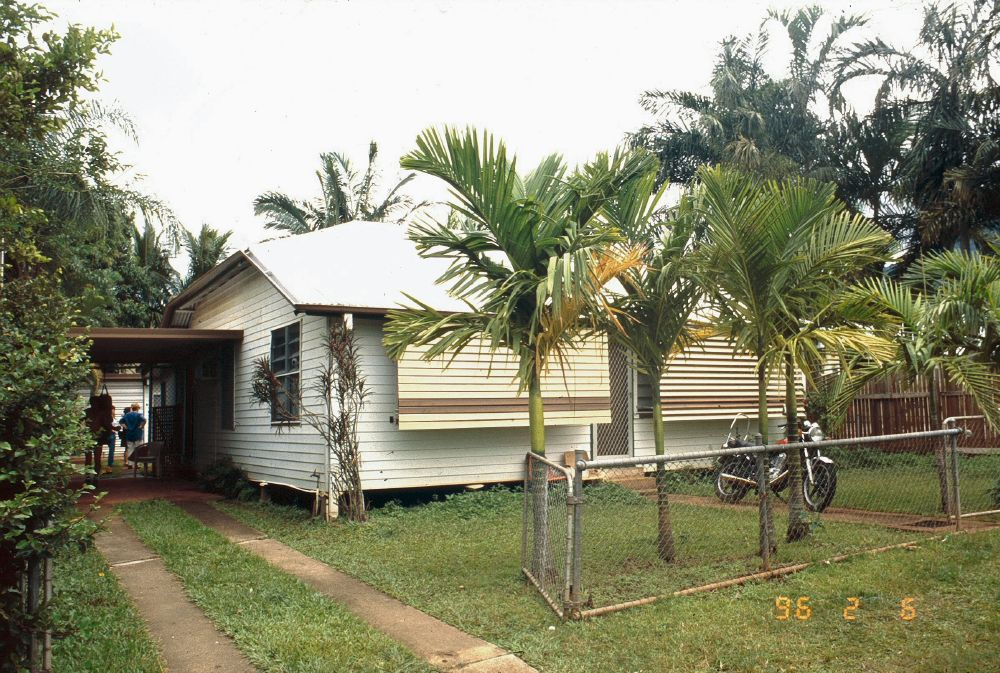
Xavier and Sadie Herbert's former cottage in Queensland in 1996

=== Novels ===
- Capricornia (1938)
- Seven Emus (1959)
- Soldiers' Women (1961) - about 4 women during World War II in Sydney
- Poor Fellow My Country (1975) – Miles Franklin Award Winner, 1975

=== Short story collections ===
- Larger than Life (1963)
- South of Capricornia (1990) – Edited by Russel McDougal
- Xavier Herbert (1992) – Edited by Frances de Groen and Peter Pierce

=== Non-fiction ===
- Disturbing Element (1963) – Autobiography
- Letters (2002) – Edited by Frances De Groen, Laurie Hergenhan
- Letters from Xavier Herbert, 1980–1983 (unpublished), By Peggy Hayes

== Xavier Herbert biographies ==
- De Groen, Frances (1998), Xavier Herbert : a biography, University of Queensland Press, ISBN 978-0-7022-3069-1
- Dunstan, Keith (1979), Ratbags, Golden Press, ISBN 978-0-85558-784-0

== Xavier Herbert literary criticism ==
- A Long and Winding Road: Xavier Herbert's Literary Journey – Sean Monahan (2003) – Review
