= Ian Mudie =

Australian poet

Ian Mayelston Mudie
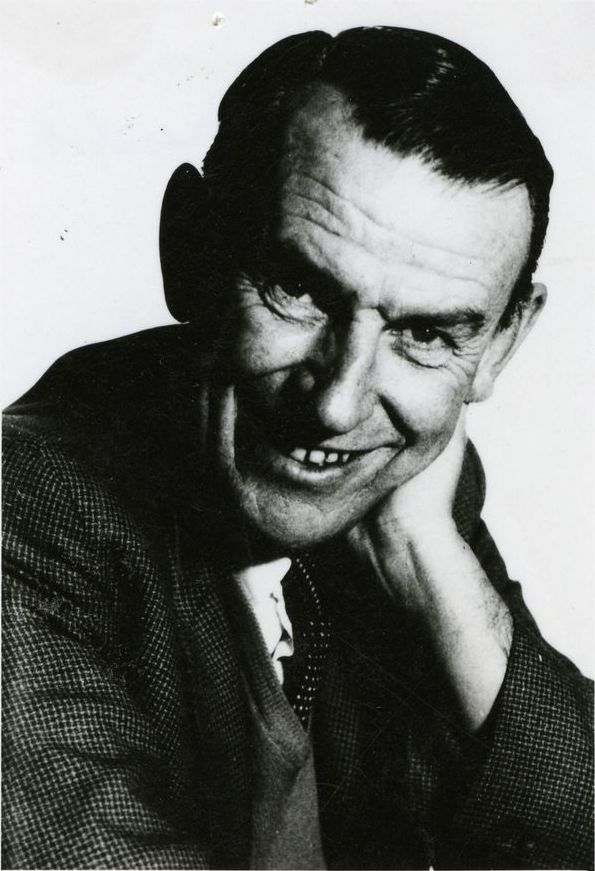
- Ian Mudie, 1950
- Born: 19 March 1911; Adelaide, South Australia
- Died: 23 October 1976 (aged 65); London, England
- Resting place: Murray River
- Education: Scotch College, Adelaide
- Occupation: Poet
- Spouse: Renee Dunford Doble
- Writing career
- Language: Australian English
- Years active: 1931-1970
- Notable awards: Grace Leven Prize for Poetry; Commonwealth Literary Fund Fellowship
- Literary movement: Jindyworobak Movement; Australia First Movement

Ian Mayelston Mudie (1 March 1911 – 23 October 1976) was an Australian poet and author.

== Early life and education ==
Mudie was born in 1911 in Hawthorn, South Australia, son of Henry Mayelston Mudie, an accountant, and his second wife Gertrude Mary. Mudie attended Scotch College, Adelaide from 1920 to 1926, but did not graduate. After school he attempted to make a living from freelance writing but also pursued work as a "wool-scourer, furniture-dealer, grape-picker, and as a salesman of insurance and real estate".

== Writing career ==
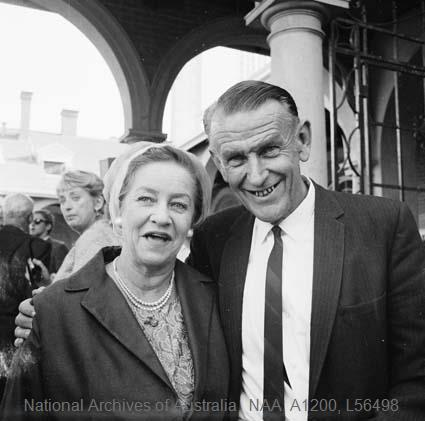
Mudie with Mary Durack in 1966

Mudie published his first poem in 1931. Encouraged by P. R. Stephensen, who published one of his poems in his magazine The Publicist in 1937, he became associated with the Jindyworobak Movement in 1939 and in 1941 moved to Sydney and became involved in the Australia First Movement. Historian David Bird has written that "Ian Mudie proved the most strident champion of the cultural line taken by Australia First and the Jindies, although he was not a member of either group at the outbreak of the war." In this period, P. R. Stephensen described Mudie's work as containing a "deep urge towards the elemental spirit of our own land, its courageous, fundamental Australianism".

He was a friend of Miles Franklin and Colin Thiele, and attracted favourable criticism from Xavier Herbert.

He took an active part in various national writers' bodies in Australia. He was a strong critic of Australia's treatment of Indigenous people. The Australian literary historian Bruce Clunies-Ross wrote:

Ian Mudie in The Australian Dream (1943), revealed the delusory quality of the nationalist perception of Australia through its refusal to take into account the destruction of the natural environment and of Aboriginal culture… the Jindyworobaks… [were] often misrepresented by critics who claimed that the movement aimed to base Australian culture on Aboriginal culture. The Jindyworobaks were interested in Aborigines, and if white Australians are now able to recognise the grim impact of their civilisation on the Aboriginal inhabitants of the country, the Jindyworobaks are partly responsible…the Jindyworobaks… wanted to achieve a harmonious relationship between culture and the environment, and realised that Aboriginal culture embodied it. This was an example from which they could learn, not by imitation, but by coming to understand and accept the conditions which the environment imposes on them.

— Australian Literature and Australian Culture in The Penguin New Literary History of Australia, ed. Laurie Hergenhan (1988)

After the Second World War Mudie was the recipient of a fellowship from the Commonwealth Literary Fund to conduct research into the paddlesteamers of the Murray-Darling river system and in 1961 published the book Riverboats. He also wrote a history of Admella, which in 1859 was wrecked off the south-east coast of South Australia, one of Australia's worst maritime disasters, and a new history of John McDouall Stuart's epic crossing of the Australian continent in 1861–1862.

In 1963 Mudie won the Grace Leven Prize for Poetry for The North-Bound Rider.

== Works ==
=== Verse ===
- Corroboree to the Sun (1940)
- This Is Australia (1941)
- The Australian Dream (1943)
- Their Seven Stars Unseen (1943)
- Poems 1934—1944 (1945)
- The Blue Crane (1959)
- The North-Bound Rider (1963)
- Look, the Kingfisher (1970)
- Selected Poems 1934—1974 (1976)

=== Editor ===
- Poets at War: An anthology of Verse by Australian Servicemen (1944)
- The Jindyworobak Anthology (1946)

=== Non-fiction ===
- Riverboats (1961)
- Wreck of the Admella (1966)
- The Heroic Journey of John McDouall Stuart (1968)
- Australia Today (1970)

=== Fiction ===
- ’’The Christmas Kangaroo’’ (1946)

== Family ==
Ian was the grandson of well-known Anglican minister William Henry Mudie. His father, Henry Mayelston Mudie, was influential in the growth of the Savings Bank of South Australia. He married Renee Dunford Doble on 30 October 1934.

He died in London and his ashes were scattered on the Murray River.

== Sources ==
- Wilde, William H., Hooton, Joy and Andrews, Barry The Oxford Companion to Australian Literature Oxford University Press, Melbourne 2nd ed. ISBN 0 19 553381 X
