= Gwen Harwood =

Australian poet

Gwen Harwood AO
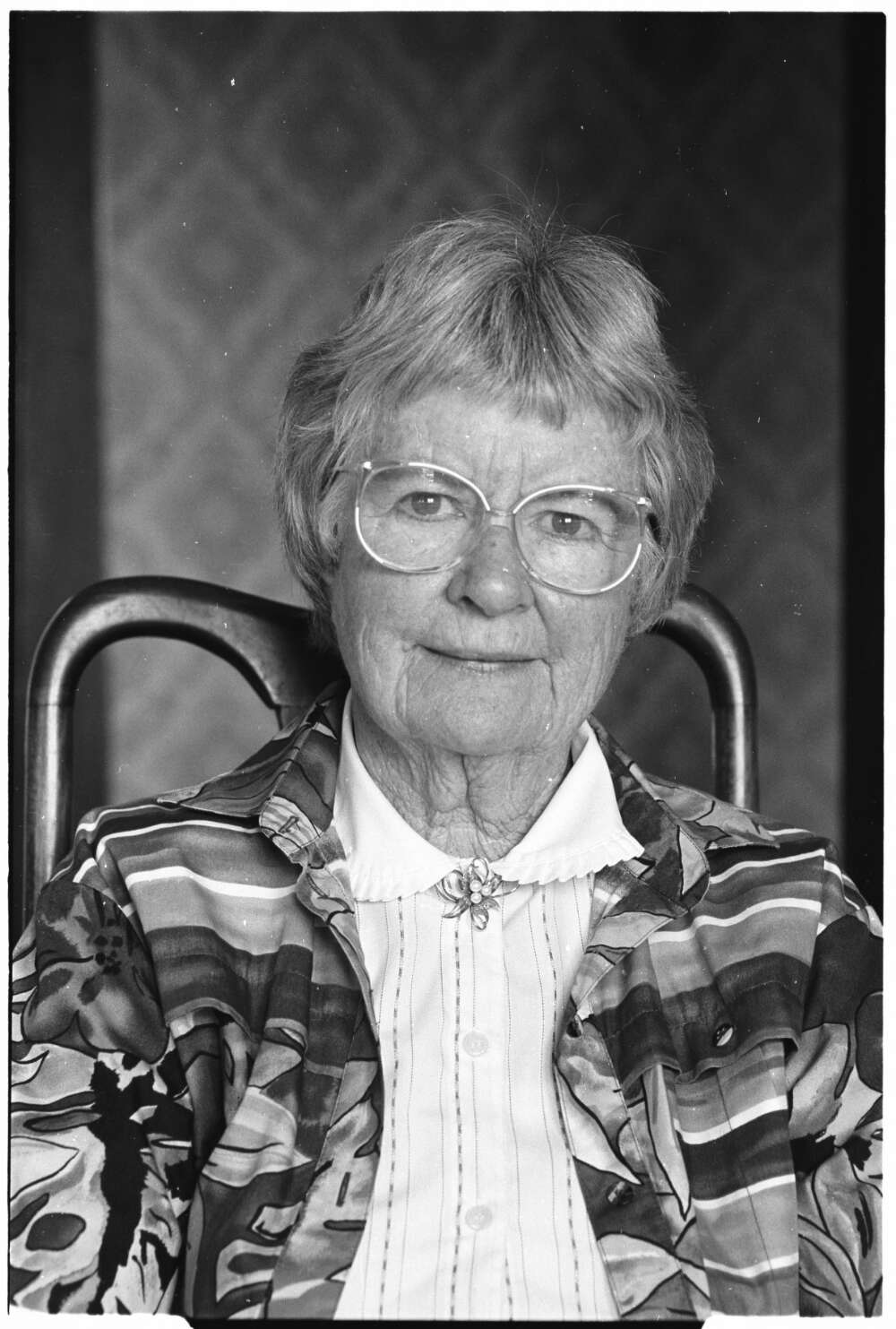
- Portrait of Gwen Harwood, West Hobart, Tasmania, 1988
- Born: Gwendoline Nessie Foster; 8 June 1920; Taringa, Brisbane
- Died: 5 December 1995 (aged 75); Hobart, Tasmania
- Spouse: Bill Harwood (m. 1945)
- Children: John Harwood
- Writing career
- Pen name: Walter Lehmann; Timothy F. Kline; W. W. Hagendoor; Francis Geyer; Miriam Stone; Alan Carvosso; Gwendoline Foster; Theophilus Panbury
- Language: English
- Years active: 1963 – 1988

Gwen Harwood AO (née Gwendoline Nessie Foster, 8 June 1920 – 5 December 1995) was an Australian poet and librettist. Harwood is regarded as one of Australia's finest poets, publishing over 420 works, including 386 poems and 13 librettos. She won numerous poetry awards and prizes, and one of Australia's most significant poetry prizes, the Gwen Harwood Poetry Prize is named for her. Her work is commonly studied in schools and university courses.

Gwen Harwood was the mother of the author John Harwood.

== Life ==
Harwood was born on 8 June 1920 in Taringa, a suburb of Brisbane. Early in her life, she developed an interest in literature, philosophy and music. Her father played piano, violin, guitar and the flute. Both Gwen and her brother were given piano lessons, and originally Gwen wanted to be a musician. Gwen's grandmother introduced her to poetry; this inspired her and became her lifelong calling and passion. She attended Brisbane Girls Grammar School and was an organist at All Saints' Church when she was young. She completed a music teacher's diploma, and also worked as a typist at the War Damage Commission from 1942.

She married linguist Bill Harwood in September 1945, shortly after which they moved to Oyster Cove, south of Hobart, as he was appointed a lecturer at the University of Tasmania. Here she developed her lifelong interest in the work of philosopher Ludwig Wittgenstein "which informs her entire opus".

== Literary career ==
Harwood had written poetry for many years, and her first poem was published in Meanjin in 1944, but her work did not start appearing regularly in journals and books until the 1960s. Her first book of poems, titled Poems, was published in 1963, followed in 1968 by Poems Volume II. Other books include The Lion's Bride (1981), Bone Scan (1988), and The Present Tense (1995). There are also several versions of a Selected Poems, including one from Penguin in 2001.

Harwood used a range of pseudonyms in her early work, such as Walter Lehmann, W. W. Hagendoor (an anagram of her name), Francis Geyer, Timothy (TF) Kline, Miriam Stone, and Alan Carvosso. Most of her poems submitted for publication under her own name were initially rejected. The editor of Meanjin, C. B. Christesen, once rejected a poem from Harwood but used an expression in it ("the freckled shade") as the title of one of his own poems. In 1961 The Bulletin accepted a sonnet from her alter ego Walter Lehmann, but only after it was published was it brought to the attention of the editor, Donald Horne, that the initial letters of each line formed the phrase "FUCK ALL EDITORS". After this, she found much greater acceptance.

She also wrote libretti for composers such as Larry Sitsky, James Penberthy, Don Kay and Ian Cugley.

She corresponded over the years with several poet friends, including Vincent Buckley, A. D. Hope, Vivian Smith, and Norman Talbot, as well as family and other friends such as Tony Riddell, and two volumes of her letters have been published. She served as president of the Tasmanian Branch of the Fellowship of Australian Writers.

Her poetry has been used by many students who are completing the Higher School Certificate (HSC) in New South Wales, Australia, by Victorian Certificate of Education (VCE) students in Victoria, Australia, by the International Baccalaureate (IB) in Australia, and by Western Australian Certificate of Education (WACE) students in Western Australia, Australia.

== Literary themes and style ==
Harwood's poetry has recurring themes of motherhood and the stifled role of women, particularly those of young mothers. Her poem "In the Park" established a certain feminist reputation but others of her poems treat motherhood in a more complex and nuanced way. Music is another recurring motif. The Tasmanian landscape, and Aboriginal dispossession of that landscape, form another theme in much of her writing. She also wrote series of poems with recurring characters, two of the most notorious being Professor Eisenbart and Kröte. Many of her poems also include biblical references and religious allusions.

The style and technique of Harwood's poetry has led to several of her works being employed by the New South Wales Board of Studies as prescribed texts for the High School Certificate. Primary focus in the English course is placed on the analysis of the themes expressed in Harwood's poetry, and how such themes are relevant in modern society. Her work is also used as a text for the Victorian Certificate of Education and West Australian Certificate of Education Literature Courses in the poetry section for its literary value and complex themes.

== Awards ==
- 1959: Meanjin Poetry Prize for "Caro Autem Infirma"
- 1960: Meanjin Poetry Prizefor "I Am the Captain of My Soul"
- 1975: Grace Leven Prize for Poetry for Selected Poems (1975)
- 1977: Robert Frost Medallion (now known as Christopher Brennan Award)
- 1978: Patrick White Award
- 1980: The Age Book of the Year Award and Non-fiction Award for Blessed City
- 1988: University of Tasmania Honorary D.Litt.
- 1989: Officer of the Order of Australia (AO)
- 1989: Victorian Premier's Literary Award for Bone Scan
- 1990: J. J. Bray Award
- 1993: University of Queensland honorary doctorate
- 1994: La Trobe University honorary doctorate
- 2005: Tasmanian Honour Roll of Women inducted for service to the arts

== Bibliography ==
=== Poetry ===
- Poems (1963)
- Poems : Volume Two (1968)
- Selected Poems (1975)
- The Lion's Bride (1981)
- Bone Scan (1988)
- The Present Tense (1995)
- Gwen Harwood : Collected Poems, 1943–1995 (2003)
- The Best 100 Poems of Gwen Harwood (2014)

=== Letters ===
- Blessed City: Letters to Thomas Riddell 1943, ed. Alison Hoddinott (Angus & Robertson, 1990) ISBN 0-207-16587-4
- A Steady Storm of Correspondence: Selected Letters of Gwen Harwood 1943–1995, ed. Gregory Kratzmann (University of Queensland Press, 2001) ISBN 0-7022-3257-2

==== Selected list of poems ====
Title	Year	First published	Reprinted/collected in
"Panther and Peacock"	1957	Australian Poetry 1957 edited by Hal Porter, Angus and Robertson, pp. 25-27	Poems, Angus and Robertson, 1963, pp. 70-72
"Last Meeting"	1957	Australian Poetry 1957 edited by Hal Porter, Angus and Robertson, pp. 28-29	Selected Poems : A New Edition, Angus and Robertson, 2001, pp. 249-250
"Prize-Giving"	1959	Meanjin, vol. 18 no. 4 December 1959	Poems, Angus and Robertson, 1963, pp. 63-64
"In the Park"	1961	The Bulletin, 8 March 1961	Poems, Angus and Robertson, 1963, p. 88
"Suburban Sonnet"	1963	The Bulletin, 12 January 1963	Poems : Volume 2, Angus and Robertson, 1968, p. 30
"A Simple Story"	1979	The Tasmanian Review, 1 June 1979	The Lion's Bride, Angus and Robertson, 1981, pp. 40-41
"Lamplight" aka "Mother Who Gave Me Life"	1980	Overland, No. 82, December 1980	The Lion's Bride, Angus and Robertson, 1981, pp. 75-76
