= 1908 in Australian literature =

This article presents a list of the historical events and publications of Australian literature during 1908.

== Books ==
- Edward Dyson
  - The Missing Link
  - Tommy Minogue
- Mrs Aeneas Gunn – We of the Never Never
- Rosa Praed
  - By Their Fruits
  - Stubble Before the Wind
- Henry Handel Richardson – Maurice Guest
- Steele Rudd – In Australia
- Edward S. Sorenson – The Squatter's Ward
- Ethel Turner – That Girl
- Lilian Turner – Paradise and the Perrys

== Short stories ==
- Louis Becke – The Pearl Divers of Roncador Reef and Other Stories
- Joseph Furphy — "The Discovery of Christmas Reef"
- Steele Rudd
  - Dad in Politics and Other Stories
  - For Life and Other Stories
- Thos. E. Spencer — A Spring Cleaning and Other Stories

== Poetry ==
- Christopher Brennan – "Towards the Source : 1894-97 : 30"
- J. Le Gay Brereton – Sea and Sky
- Victor J. Daley – "The Road of Roses"
- C. J. Dennis — "The Austra-laise"
- Mabel Forrest – "The Call of the North"
- Henry Lawson
  - "Meditations on a Pawn Ticket"
  - "One Hundred and Three"
- Dorothea Mackellar – "My Country"
- E.G. (Dryblower) Murphy – "Jarrahland Jingles"
- John Shaw Neilson – "The Sundowner"
- Edward S. Sorenson – "Bill Brown"

== Drama ==
- Miles Franklin
  - The Scandal-Monger
  - The Survivors: A Modern Play in Four Acts
- Sumner Locke – The Vicissitudes of Vivienne

== Births ==
A list, ordered by date of birth (and, if the date is either unspecified or repeated, ordered alphabetically by surname) of births in 1908 of Australian literary figures, authors of written works or literature-related individuals follows, including year of death.

- 31 January — Connie Christie, illustrator and writer for children (died 1989)
- 6 February — Jim Crawford, playwright (died 1973)
- 10 March — Rupert Lockwood, journalist and author (died 1997)
- 2 April – Ronald McCuaig, poet (died 1993)
- 23 May – F. J. Thwaites, novelist (died 1979)
- 26 August — Alexandra Hasluck, historian (died 1993)
- 27 August – Don Bradman, cricketer and author (died 2001)
- 9 October – Harry Hooton, poet (died 1961)
- 4 November – Colin Simpson, journalist and travel writer (died 1983)
- 30 November – Eric Irvin, historian and poet (died 1993)

== Deaths ==
A list, ordered by date of death (and, if the date is either unspecified or repeated, ordered alphabetically by surname) of deaths in 1908 of Australian literary figures, authors of written works or literature-related individuals follows, including year of birth.

- 12 July — Robert Potter, minister and writer (born 1831)
- 14 November – Ernest Favenc, poet and short story writer (born 1845)

== See also ==
- 1908 in Australia
- 1908 in literature
- 1908 in poetry
- List of years in Australian literature
- List of years in literature
