= Modern Australian Verse =

1964 poetry anthology edited by Douglas Stewart

- Author: Douglas Stewart
- Language: English
- Series: Poetry in Australia
- Genre: Poetry anthology
- Publisher: Angus and Robertson
- Publication date: 1964
- Publication place: Australia
- Media type: Print
- Pages: 246 pp.
- Preceded by: From the Ballads to Brennan
- Followed by: -

Modern Australian Verse is an anthology of Australian poetry edited by Douglas Stewart, published by Angus and Robertson in 1964.

The collection contains 175 poems, from a variety of sources.

The poems are arranged "more or less in chronological order, according to the years of birth of the poets."

This anthology comprises Volume II of a two-part anthology set titled Poetry in Australia. The first volume, titled From the Ballads to Brennan was edited by T. Inglis Moore and was also published by Angus and Robertson in 1964.

== Editor's note ==
In his introduction to the anthology editor Douglas Stewart explained both his selection process and the reason behind choosing the year 1930 as his starting point.

"Though I have not excluded any good poems merely because they are familiar, the resulting contents are more different from those of other anthologies than I had expected them to be; but that, though it is doubdess due pardy to the principle on which the selection was made, is chiefly because of the period set down for it: from 1930 onwards. Since Brennan, Shaw Neilson, Hugh McCrae, Mary Gilmore and many others who wrote in the earlier years of this century were, after consultation with the calendar and discussion with Professor Inglis Moore, regarded as actually or essentially out of my period, I could not include these poets; but at the same time I was free to range wider among contemporary writers than most other anthologists have been able to, and also to give full weight to those–such as Slessor, FitzGerald, A. D. Hope and Judith Wright–who are outstanding among them.

"The year set down for this volume to open–1930–was in a sense arbitrary, as are all attempts to divide the continuous, living stream of poetry into neat periods of time. Poetry does not alter so much over the years and over the centuries as we may be led to imagine."

== Contents ==
- Country Towns", Kenneth Slessor
- Excerpt from "Five Visions of Captain Cook", Kenneth Slessor
- "The Atlas : 1 : The King of Cuckooz", Kenneth Slessor
- "The Atlas : 2 : Post-Roads", Kenneth Slessor
- "The Atlas : 3 : Dutch Seacoast", Kenneth Slessor
- "The Atlas : 4 : Mermaids", Kenneth Slessor
- "Five Bells", Kenneth Slessor
- "Beach Burial", Kenneth Slessor
- "The Victoria Markets Recollected in Tranquillity", Furnley Maurice
- "The Net-Menders", Brian Vrepont
- "Waking, Child, While you Slept", Ethel Anderson
- "Kunai-mai-pa Mo", Ethel Anderson
- "Breaking", Alex J. Alla
- "Return of the Native", Harley Matthews
- "Dithyramb in Retrospect", Peter Hopegood
- "The Protagonist", Peter Hopegood
- "A New Shirt", Paul L. Grano
- "I Danced Before I Had Two Feet", Max Dunn
- "Eagles Over the Lambing Paddock", Ernest G. Moll
- "A Gnarled Riverina Gum-Tree", Ernest G. Moll
- "Star Drill", T. Inglis Moore
- "Comrade in Arms", T. Inglis Moore
- "Side Street", Robert D. FitzGerald
- "The Face of the Waters", Robert D. FitzGerald
- "The Wind at Your Door", Robert D. FitzGerald
- "Macquarie Place", Robert D. FitzGerald
- "Birds", Llywelyn
- "Love in Cottage", J. A. R. McKellar
- "Daydreamers", Norma L. Davis
- "Burke and Wills", Ken Barratt
- "A Volume of Chopin", James Picot
- "The Lord in the Wind", James Picot
- Excerpt from "Rolling John", A. J. Wood
- "The Death of the Bird", A. D. Hope
- "Pyramis or The House of Ascent", A. D. Hope
- "An Epistle : Edward Sackville to Venetia Digby", A. D. Hope
- "Letter to a Friend", John Thompson
- "The Adventurers", John Thompson
- "Sonnet (Recitative)", Ronald McCuaig
- "L'Apres-midi d'une Fille aux Cheveux de Lin", Ronald McCuaig
- "Au Tombeau de Mon Pere...", Ronald McCuaig
- "Christmas, 1942", Eric Irvin
- "Native-Born", Eve Langley
- "Wakeful in the Township", Elizabeth Riddell
- "Under the Casuarina", Elizabeth Riddell
- "Back Lane", R. D. Murphy
- "Generations", Robert Clark
- "The Farm Near Norman's Lane", Mary Finnin
- "Christopher Columbus : Cipangu", William Hart-Smith
- Extract from "Christopher Columbus", William Hart-Smith
- "Christopher Columbus : Departure", William Hart-Smith
- "Christopher Columbus : Space (Columbus Goes West)", William Hart-Smith
- "Christopher Columbus : Comes Fog and Mist", William Hart-Smith
- "Christopher Columbus : The Waterspout", William Hart-Smith
- "They'll Tell You about Me", Ian Mudie
- "Wilderness Theme", Ian Mudie
- "The Tea-Tree and the Lyre-Bird", Roland Robinson
- "The Tank", Roland Robinson
- "Rock-Lily", Roland Robinson
- "Becalmed", John Blight
- "Mallee in October", Flexmore Hudson
- "The Golden Bird", Rex Ingamells
- "Ship From Thames", Rex Ingamells
- "Heat", Kenneth Mackenzie
- "A Fairy Tale", Kenneth Mackenzie
- "Table-Birds", Kenneth Mackenzie
- "An Old Inmate", Kenneth Mackenzie
- "Legerdemain", Kenneth Mackenzie
- "For Pat... Pat Young", Kenneth Mackenzie
- "The Snow Gum", Douglas Stewart
- "Mahony's Mountain", Douglas Stewart
- "Brindabella", Douglas Stewart
- "The Silkworms", Douglas Stewart
- "Nesting Time", Douglas Stewart
- "The Garden of Ships", Douglas Stewart
- "Lines Written in a Dug-Out", A. G. Austin
- "Spring Offensive, 1941", Maurice Biggs
- "Harry Pearce", David Campbell
- "Men in Green", David Campbell
- "Night Sowing", David Campbell
- "Ariel", David Campbell
- "Pallid Cuckoo [I]", David Campbell
- "The Bunyip and the Whistling Kettle", J. S. Manifold
- Extract from "The Tomb of Lt. John Learmonth, AIF", J. S. Manifold
- "Gordon Childe", David Martin
- "Thermopylae", Michael Thwaites
- "The Bull", Judith Wright
- "The Twins", Judith Wright
- "Wonga Vine", Judith Wright
- "The Hawthorn Hedge", Judith Wright
- "Bullocky", Judith Wright
- "South of My Days", Judith Wright
- "The Old Prison", Judith Wright
- "Woman to Man", Judith Wright
- "Storm", Judith Wright
- "Chanticleer", Margaret Irvin
- "Wu Tao-Tzu's Lament in Autumn", Harold Stewart
- "The Leaf-Maker", Harold Stewart
- "Fishing Season", Val Vallis
- "Independence", Nancy Cato
- "Canticle", James McAuley
- "Late Winter", James McAuley
- "At Bungendore", James McAuley
- "New Guinea", James McAuley
- "Pieta", James McAuley
- "Lalique", Hal Porter
- "The Sheep", Hal Porter
- "Consecration of the House", Wolfe Fairbridge
- "Advice from a Nightwatchman", Ian Healy
- "Air Shaft", Ian Healy
- Extract from "Methuselah", Rosemary Dobson
- "The Raising of the Dead", Rosemary Dobson
- "Detail from an Annunciation by Crivelli", Rosemary Dobson
- "The Birth", Rosemary Dobson
- "Across the Straits", Rosemary Dobson
- "Panther and Peacock", Gwen Harwood
- "Prizegiving", Gwen Harwood
- "Last Meeting", Gwen Harwood
- "Bert Schultz", Colin Thiele
- "Tom Farley", Colin Thiele
- "Apopemptic Hymn", Dorothy Auchterlonie
- "Captain Arthur Phillip and the Birds", Lex Banning
- "The Tantanoola Tiger", Max Harris
- "Martin Buber in the Pub", Max Harris
- "The White Eagle", Nan McDonald
- "The Hatters", Nan McDonald
- "Coronation Day at Melrose", Peter Bladen
- "Variations on a Medieval Theme", Geoffrey Dutton
- "January", Geoffrey Dutton
- "Hillside", Alexander Craig
- "Revelation", Nancy Keesing
- "Bread", Nancy Keesing
- "Sheaf-Tosser", Eric Rolls
- "Little Sticks", Eric Rolls
- "Mullabinda", David Rowbotham
- "The Town", David Rowbotham
- "Picaninny Thoughts The Droving Man", Thea Astley
- "Late Tutorial", Vincent Buckley
- "Various Wakings", Vincent Buckley
- "The Sea and the Tiger", Laurence Collinson
- "Canberra in April", J. R. Rowland
- "Idyll", Francis Webb
- "A Papuan Shepherd", Francis Webb
- Excerpt from "The Room (From Leighhardt in Theatre)", Francis Webb
- "The Sea", Francis Webb
- "Five Days Old", Francis Webb
- "Kangaroo by Nightfall", Noel Macainsh
- "Cow Dance", Bruce Beaver
- "Morning, Morning", Ray Mathew
- "At a Time", Ray Mathew
- "Love and Marriage", Ray Mathew
- "Phar Lap in the Melbourne Museum", Peter Porter
- "Night Out", R. A. Simpson
- "The City : Midnight", Bruce Dawe
- "Only the Beards are Different", Bruce Dawe
- "Barnacle Geese", Charles Higham
- "Noah's Song", Evan Jones
- "Half-Heard", Christopher Koch
- "Trader's Return", Sylvia Lawson
- "Bedlam Hills", Vivian Smith
- "The Last Summer", Vivian Smith
- "At My Grandmother's", David Malouf
- "Love Poem", Chris Wallace-Crabbe
- "Ancient Historian", Chris Wallace-Crabbe
- "Eyewitness", Rodney Hall
- "The Carol of Three", Clive Sansom
- "The Finches", Thomas Shapcott
- "The Bush-Fiddle", Judith Rodriguez
- "Athlete", Don Maynard
- "The Last Campaign", Geoffrey Lehmann
- "The Utopia of Lord Mayor Howard", Randolph Stow
- "Dust", Randolph Stow
- "Ruins of the City of Hay", Randolph Stow
- "Strange Fruit", Randolph Stow
- "Shorelines", Les Murray

== Publication history ==
The anthology was re-issued as follows:

- 1965 University of California Press, USA
- 1968 Angus and Robertson, Australia

== Critical reception ==
H. P. Heseltine, reviewing the anthology in The Bulletin noted that the editor, Douglas Stewart, has "contributed to one of the tasks of all anthologists–the establishing, through selection or rejection, of the poetic touchstones of a place and time. By reprinting certain poems which have appeared again and again in anthologies, he confirms their centrality."

In The Age newspaper Dennis Douglas wrote: "It is clear from this anthology that the movement of Australian poetry is towards fluency, flexibility and economy of technique. Australian verse, like Australian slang, tends to cultivate a laconic resourcefulness."

== See also ==
- 1964 in Australian literature
