= 1939 in Australian literature =

This article presents a list of the historical events and publications of Australian literature during 1939.

== Events ==
- The Queenslander ceases publication after the last edition on February 22 1939. The magazine was first published on February 3 1866 by Thomas Blacket Stephens in Brisbane and published serialised novels, poems and short stories by many Australian writers.
- The Southerly literary journal publishes its first issue.

== Literary novels ==
- Erle Cox – Fool's Harvest
- Miles Franklin and Dymphna Cusack – Pioneers on Parade
- Michael Innes – Stop Press
- Will Lawson – In Ben Boyd's Day
- Jack Lindsay – Lost Birthright
- Myra Morris – Dark Tumult
- Henry Handel Richardson – The Young Cosima
- Alice Grant Rosman – William's Room
- Nevil Shute – What Happened to the Corbetts (aka Ordeal)
- Kylie Tennant – Foveaux
- F. J. Thwaites – Fever
- Patrick White – Happy Valley

== Short stories ==
- Katharine Susannah Prichard
  - "The Flight"
  - "Painted Finches"
- Dal Stivens – "Solemn Mass"

== Crime and mystery ==
- Arthur Gask
  - The Fall of a Dictator
  - The Vengeance of Larose
- E. V. Timms – Dark Interlude
- Arthur Upfield – The Mystery of Swordfish Reef

== Children's ==
- Mary Grant Bruce – Son of Billabong
- Connie Christie – The Adventures of Pinkishell
- Dorothy Wall – The Complete Adventures of Blinky Bill

== Poetry ==
- Mary Gilmore – Battlefields
- A. D. Hope – "Australia"
- Hugh McCrae – Poems
- Furnley Maurice – "Whenever I Have..."
- Kenneth Slessor
  - "Five Bells"
  - Five Bells : XX Poems
  - "North Country"
  - "South Country"
- Brian Vrepont – "The Miracle"

== Drama ==
=== Radio ===
- Sumner Locke Elliott – Crazy Family
- Trevor Heath – Spinney Under the Rain
- Catherine Shepherd – The Valiant Tinker

=== Theatre ===
- George Landen Dann – Caroline Chisholm
- Sumner Locke Elliott
  - The Cow Jumped Over the Moon
  - Interval

== Awards and honours ==
=== Literary ===
Award	Author	Title	Publisher
ALS Gold Medal	Xavier Herbert	Capricornia	Angus and Robertson

=== Poetry ===
Award	Author	Title
C.J. Dennis Memorial Prize	Brian Vrepont	"The Miracle'"

== Births ==
A list, ordered by date of birth (and, if the date is either unspecified or repeated, ordered alphabetically by surname) of births in 1939 of Australian literary figures, authors of written works or literature-related individuals follows, including year of death.

- 4 January – J. S. Harry, poet (died 2015)
- 29 January – Germaine Greer, theorist, academic and journalist
- 19 February – Beatrice Faust, co-founder of Women's Electoral Lobby, journalist and author (died 2019)
- 25 February – Gerald Murnane, novelist
- 12 July – Phillip Adams, broadcaster and journalist
- 22 August – Peter Steele, poet (died 2012)
- 6 September – Barbara Hanrahan, writer (died 1991)
- 7 October – Clive James, poet, novelist and critic (died 2019)
- 9 October – John Pilger, journalist, writer and documentary filmmaker (died 2023 in London)
- 13 October – Suzanne Edgar, poet, short story writer and historian
- 14 December – John Baxter, novelist and biographer
- 30 December – Glenda Adams, novelist (died 2007)

Unknown date

- Jas H. Duke, performance poet (died 1992)

== Deaths ==
A list, ordered by date of death (and, if the date is either unspecified or repeated, ordered alphabetically by surname) of deaths in 1939 of Australian literary figures, authors of written works or literature-related individuals follows, including year of birth.

- 3 May – Hilary Lofting, novelist, travel writer, journalist and editor (born 1881)
- 4 November — Amy Mack, writer, journalist and editor (born 1876)
- 19 December – Edward Sorenson, poet (born 1869)

== See also ==
- 1939 in Australia
- 1939 in literature
- 1939 in poetry
- List of years in Australian literature
- List of years in literature
