= Captain Dobbin =

1932 poem by Australian poet Kenneth Slessor

- by Kenneth Slessor
- First published in: Cuckooz Contrey
- Country: Australia
- Language: English
- Genre: Poetry
- Publication date: 1932

"Captain Dobbin" (1932) is a poem by Australian poet Kenneth Slessor.

It was originally published in the poet's collection Cuckooz Contrey, and was subsequently reprinted in the author's single-author collections and a number of Australian poetry anthologies.

The poem "is based partly on a Captain Bayldon, retired sea captain and uncle of Slessor's first wife, Noela".

== Synopsis ==
"The poem describes an eccentric old seaman who has enshrined in his cottage by the harbour the treasures of his seafaring days."

== Critical reception ==
In his review of the poet's collection Poems in The Bulletin, critic and poet A. D. Hope wrote: "'Captain Dobbin' and 'Five Visions of Captain Cook' are his outstanding successes, in what is very close to the art of Browning, the Browning of Men and Women and the dramatic monologues."

The Oxford Companion to Australian Literature called this poem "a fine piece of characterisation with the Slessor penchant for lavish and colorful imagery".

A. K. Thompson commented that "The brilliance of some of the descriptions diverts the attention from the subject-matter of the poem to the illustration of the subject-matter. The whole is neglected while the detail compels scrutiny."

== Publication history ==
After the poem's initial publication in Cuckooz Contrey in 1932 it was reprinted as follows:

- One Hundred Poems : 1919-1939 by Kenneth Slessor, Angus and Robertson, 1944
- Poems by Kenneth Slessor, Angus and Robertson, 1957
- The Penguin Book of Australian Verse edited by John Thompson, Kenneth Slessor and R. G. Howarth, Penguin Books, 1958
- The Penguin Book of Australian Verse edited by Harry Heseltine, Penguin Books, 1972
- Australian Verse from 1805 : A Continuum edited by Geoffrey Dutton, Rigby, 1976
- Australian Poems in Perspective : A Collection of Poems and Critical Commentaries edited by P. K. Elkin, University of Queensland Press, 1978
- The Golden Apples of the Sun : Twentieth Century Australian Poetry edited by Chris Wallace-Crabbe, Melbourne University Press, 1980
- The Illustrated Treasury of Australian Verse edited by Beatrice Davis, Nelson, 1984
- The Sea Poems of Kenneth Slessor by Kenneth Slessor, Brindabella Press, 1990
- Kenneth Slessor : Poetry, Essays, War Despatches, War Diaries, Journalism, Autobiographical Material and Letters edited by Dennis Haskell, University of Queensland Press, 1991
- Australian Poetry in the Twentieth Century edited by Robert Gray and Geoffrey Lehmann, Heinemann, 1991
- Kenneth Slessor : Collected Poems by Kenneth Slessor, Angus and Robertson, 1994
- The Puncher & Wattmann Anthology of Australian Poetry edited by John Leonard, Puncher & Wattmann, 2009
- Australian Poetry Since 1788 edited by Geoffrey Lehmann and Robert Gray, University of NSW Press, 2011

== Notes ==
- You can read the full text of the poem on the All Poetry website.

== See also ==
- 1932 in Australian literature
- 1932 in poetry
