= 1932 in Australian literature =

This article presents a list of the historical events and publications of Australian literature during 1932.

== Events ==
- The final issue of Aussie: The Australian Soldiers' Magazine appears.

== Books ==
- Marie Bjelke-Petersen — The Rainbow Lute
- Eleanor Dark — Slow Dawning
- Jean Devanny — Poor Swine
- Velia Ercole — No Escape
- Norman Lindsay
  - The Cautious Amorist
  - Miracles by Arrangement (aka Mr Gresham and Olympus)
- Leonard Mann — Flesh in Armour
- Vance Palmer — Daybreak
- Alice Grant Rosman — Benefits Received
- Nevil Shute — Lonely Road
- F. J. Thwaites – Hell's Doorway
- E. V. Timms — Alicia Deane
- Arthur W. Upfield
  - Breakaway House
  - Gripped by Drought
  - A Royal Abduction

== Poetry ==
- Dulcie Deamer — Messalina
- C. J. Dennis — "'I Dips Me Lid' to the Sydney Harbour Bridge"
- Mary Gilmore
  - "The Men of Eureka (A Recollection)"
  - "The Myall in Prison"
  - Under the Wilgas
- Will H. Ogilvie — The Collected Sporting Verse of Will H. Ogilvie
- Katharine Susannah Prichard — The Earth Lover and Other Verses
- Kenneth Slessor
  - "Captain Dobbin"
  - "Country Towns"
  - Cuckooz Contrey
  - "Elegy in a Botanic Gardens"

== Drama ==
- Varney Monk — Collits' Inn

== Biographies ==
- Ion Idriess — Flynn of the Inland

== Awards and honours ==
=== Literary ===
Award	Author	Title	Publisher
ALS Gold Medal	Leonard Mann	Flesh in Armour	Phaedrus Books

== Births ==
A list, ordered by date of birth (and, if the date is either unspecified or repeated, ordered alphabetically by surname) of births in 1932 of Australian literary figures, authors of written works or literature-related individuals follows, including year of death.

- 7 January — Katharine Brisbane, critic
- 29 May — Jill Adelaide Neville, novelist, playwright and poet (died in London, 1997)
- 6 July — Ted Egan, poet (died 2025)
- 16 July — Christopher Koch, novelist (died 2013)
- 12 November — Sylvia Lawson, historian, journalist and critic (died 2017)

== Deaths ==
A list, ordered by date of death (and, if the date is either unspecified or repeated, ordered alphabetically by surname) of deaths in 1932 of Australian literary figures, authors of written works or literature-related individuals follows, including year of birth.

- 8 April – Hubert Church, poet (born 1857)
- 23 June — Francis Kenna, poet (born 1865)
- 12 July — Fergus Hume, novelist (born 1859)
- 5 October — Christopher Brennan, poet (born 1870)
- 3 December — Fred Johns, biographer and journalist (born 1868 in America)
- 19 December — Arthur Wright, novelist (born 1870)

== See also ==
- 1932 in Australia
- 1932 in literature
- 1932 in poetry
- List of years in Australian literature
- List of years in literature
