= Commercial traveller =

A commercial traveller, in Australian English, is an agent for a manufacturer or wholesaler, who solicits orders for goods from retailers or businesses.

The Commercial Traveller's Association (CTA) was founded in both Adelaide and Melbourne in 1866 as a mutual benefit association, or fraternity, providing sickness and other benefits, such as discounted accommodation at participating hotels and discounted travel from some companies. Membership expanded into warehousemen and other white collar occupations.

The organisation rapidly spread to other states. A national body, United Commercial Travellers' Association of Australasia Ltd was formed in 1895, and disbanded in 2014, along with the Victorian CTA. The New South Wales and South Australian chapters persisted well into the 21st-century as a business executives association.

== In popular culture ==
The commercial traveller has long been the butt of cartoons and jokes, generally characterised as a middle-aged roué.

The Commercial Traveller's Wife is a poem by Ronald McCuaig, illustrating the invidious position of a young man who rejects the advances of his landlady.
