= Country Towns =

1932 poem by Australian poet Kenneth Slessor

- by Kenneth Slessor
- Written: 1932
- First published in: Cuckooz Contrey
- Country: Australia
- Language: English
- Publication date: 1932

"Country Towns" (1932) is a poem by Australian poet Kenneth Slessor.

It was originally published in the poet's collection Cuckooz Contrey, and was subsequently reprinted in the author's single-author collections and a number of Australian poetry anthologies.

== Critical reception ==
In the UQP Studies in Australian Literature volume devoted to the poet, Kenneth Slessor : Critical Readings edited by Philip Mead, Vincent Buckley called this "the most sprightly of his short poems", and Peter Kirkpatrick referred to the poem's "dozy bucolic irony" being "possible because it is evocative of human spaces: towns."

While reviewing the poet's 1944 collection, One Hundred Poems : 1919-1939, in The Sydney Morning Herald, R. G. Howarth commented that with this poem "we have, all together, accurate observation, humour, and true poetry."

== Author's note ==
In his commentary about the poem in his essay "Some Notes on the Poems", included in his poetry collection Selected Poems (Angus and Robertson, 1988), Slessor stated: "It refers to no country town specifically but is a composite of many which have seemed the same. Its period is fading, or perhaps has already vanished, since farmers today prefer motors to mares and buggy-wheels are seldom heard."

== Publication history ==
After the poem's initial publication Cuckooz Contrey in 1932 it was reprinted as follows:

- One Hundred Poems : 1919-1939 by Kenneth Slessor, Angus and Robertson, 1944
- Poets of Australia : An Anthology of Australian Verse edited by George Mackaness, Angus & Robertson, 1946
- An Australasian Anthology : Australian and New Zealand Poems edited by Percival Serle, R. H. Croll, and Frank Wilmot, Collins, 1946
- This Land of Ours : Australia edited by George Farwell and Frank H. Johnston, Angus and Robertson, 1949
- New Land, New Language : An Anthology of Australian Verse edited by Judith Wright, Oxford University Press, 1957
- Australian Poets Speak edited by Colin Thiele and Ian Mudie, Rigby, 1961
- Modern Australian Verse edited by Douglas Stewart, Angus and Robertson, 1964
- Songs for All Seasons : 100 Poems for Young People edited by Rosemary Dobson, Angus and Robertson, 1967
- Silence Into Song : An Anthology of Australian Verse edited by Clifford O'Brien, Rigby, 1968
- The Land's Meaning edited by L. M. Hannan and B. A. Breen, Macmillan, 1973
- Australia Fair : Poems and Paintings edited by Douglas Stewart, Ure Smith, 1974
- Poems by Kenneth Slessor, Angus and Robertson, 1975
- Australian Verse from 1805 : A Continuum edited by Geoffrey Dutton, 1976
- The Collins Book of Australian Poetry edited by Rodney Hall, Collins, 1981
- The Illustrated Treasury of Australian Verse edited by Beatrice Davis, Nelson, 1984
- My Country : Australian Poetry and Short Stories, Two Hundred Years edited by Leonie Kramer, Lansdowne, 1985
- The Faber Book of Modern Australian Verse edited by Vincent Buckley, Faber, 1991
- Kenneth Slessor : Poetry, Essays, War Despatches, War Diaries, Journalism, Autobiographical Material and Letters edited by Dennis Haskell, University of Queensland Press, 1991
- A Treasury of Bush Verse edited by G. A. Wilkes, Angus and Robertson, 1991
- Kenneth Slessor : Collected Poems by Kenneth Slessor, Angus and Robertson, 1994
- Fivefathers : Five Australian Poets of the Pre-Academic Era edited by Les Murray, Carcanet, 1994
- Australian Verse : An Oxford Anthology edited by John Leonard, Oxford University Press, 1998
- Two Centuries of Australian Poetry edited by Kathrine Bell, Gary Allen, 2007
- The Puncher & Wattmann Anthology of Australian Poetry edited by John Leonard, Puncher & Wattmann, 2009
- Australian Poetry Since 1788 edited by Geoffrey Lehmann and Robert Gray, University of NSW Press, 2011

The poem was also translated into Esperanto in 1988.

== Notes ==
- The full text of the poem is available on the All Poetry website.
- Poet David Rowbotham, in his column Chronicle Arcade in 1952, for The Toowoomba Chronicle and Darling Downs Gazette, referred to a line from the poem: "Public-houses of yellow wood with '1860' over their doors," noting that one such pub exists in Yetman, New South Wales.

== See also ==
- 1932 in Australian literature
- 1932 in poetry
