= Elegy in a Botanic Gardens =

1932 poem by Australian poet Kenneth Slessor

- by Kenneth Slessor
- First published in: Cuckooz Contrey
- Country: Australia
- Language: English
- Publication date: 1932
- Lines: 27

"Elegy in a Botanic Gardens" (1932) is a poem by Australian poet Kenneth Slessor.

It was originally published in the poet's collection Cuckooz Contrey, and was subsequently reprinted in the author's single-author collections and a number of Australian poetry anthologies.

== Synopsis ==
The poet returns to the Botanic Gardens in Autumn, remembering that he was there in Spring with his lover. Now that affair is over and all that is left for him are the trees, the memories and the institutional signs.

== Critical reception ==
In his study of the poet for Oxford University Press, critic Adrian Caesar noted the poem shows a "lack of vitality, world-weariness, a feeling of middle-aged ennui.” It is a lament for a love affair in which the poet visits in autumn the gardens where spring is said to have 'used him better'."

Andrew Taylor commented that the poem "narrates, retrospectively, the course of a romance and its apparent termination. No cause is given for the death of the romance, but its effect has been to relocate the subject's consciousness from Wagner and memories of his springtime romance to Latin and botany."

== Publication history ==
After the poem's initial publication Cuckooz Contrey in 1932 it was reprinted as follows:

- One Hundred Poems : 1919-1939 by Kenneth Slessor, Angus and Robertson, 1944
- Poems by Kenneth Slessor, Angus and Robertson, 1957
- The Penguin Book of Australian Verse edited by Harry Heseltine, Penguin Books, 1972
- Kenneth Slessor : Poetry, Essays, War Despatches, War Diaries, Journalism, Autobiographical Material and Letters edited by Dennis Haskell, University of Queensland Press, 1991
- Kenneth Slessor : Collected Poems by Kenneth Slessor, Angus and Robertson, 1994
- Fivefathers : Five Australian Poets of the Pre-Academic Era edited by Les Murray, Carcanet, 1994
- An Anthology of Australian Literature edited by Ch'oe Chin-yong and Cynthia Van Den Driesen (editor), Hansin Munhwasa, 1995
- A Return to Poetry 2000 edited by Michael Duffy (2000)
- 100 Australian Poems of Love and Loss edited by Jamie Grant, Hardie Grant Books, 2011

== Notes ==
- You can read the full text of the poem on the All Poetry website.

== See also ==
- 1932 in Australian literature
- 1932 in poetry
