= North Country (poem) =

1939 poem by Australian poet Kenneth Slessor

- by Kenneth Slessor
- First published in: Five Bells : XX Poems
- Country: Australia
- Language: English
- Publication date: 1939
- Lines: 28

"North Country" (1939) is a poem by Australian poet Kenneth Slessor.

It was originally published in the poet's collection Five Bells : XX Poems, and was subsequently reprinted in the author's single-author collections and a number of Australian poetry anthologies.

== Synopsis ==
The "North country" is filled with trees which are gradually being felled. The poet sees this activity as a battle between nature and the need to fill the land "With butter-works and railway-stations/And public institutions,/And scornful rumps of cows". The trees are the victims which lie "Dripping red with blood."

== Critical reception ==
In his study of the poet for Oxford University Press, critic Adrian Caesar noted in this poem that "Slessor fashions seven quatrains into a single sentence, giving the poem a passionate momentum as he explores a sense of death, decay and incipient violence which is both intrinsic to the landscape, and exacerbated by human interventions."

A. C. W. Mitchell commented that the poem “relies heavily on the sudden fusion of unusual components in the images for their effectiveness."

In a review of the poet's collection Selected Poems, Peter Kirkpatrick noted that in this poem "the empty, uncanny bush hides a history of ecological and human violence. 'North Country' teeters into gothic: here the forests of ringbarked and felled trees resemble a massacre site".

== Publication history ==
After the poem's initial publication Five Bells : XX Poems in 1939 it was reprinted as follows:

- One Hundred Poems : 1919-1939 by Kenneth Slessor, Angus and Robertson, 1944
- Poems by Kenneth Slessor, Angus and Robertson, 1957
- The Collins Book of Australian Poetry edited by Rodney Hall, Collins, 1981
- My Country : Australian Poetry and Short Stories, Two Hundred Years edited by Leonie Kramer, Lansdowne, 1985
- The Faber Book of Modern Australian Verse edited by Vincent Buckley, Faber, 1991
- Kenneth Slessor : Poetry, Essays, War Despatches, War Diaries, Journalism, Autobiographical Material and Letters edited by Dennis Haskell, University of Queensland Press, 1991
- Australian Poetry in the Twentieth Century edited by Robert Gray and Geoffrey Lehmann, Heinemann, 1991
- Kenneth Slessor : Collected Poems by Kenneth Slessor, Angus and Robertson, 1994
- Fivefathers : Five Australian Poets of the Pre-Academic Era edited by Les Murray, Carcanet, 1994
- Australian Poetry Since 1788 edited by Geoffrey Lehmann and Robert Gray, University of NSW Press, 2011

== Notes ==
- You can read the full text of the poem on the All Poetry website.

== See also ==
- "South Country" by Kenneth Slessor
- 1939 in Australian literature
- 1939 in poetry
