= Five Bells : XX Poems =

1939 poetry collection by Kenneth Slessor

- Author: Kenneth Slessor
- Language: English
- Genre: Poetry collection
- Publisher: Frank Johnson Ltd.
- Publication date: 1939
- Publication place: Australia
- Media type: Print
- Pages: 43 pp.

Five Bells : XX Poems is a poetry collection by Australian poet Kenneth Slessor, published by Frank Johnson Ltd. in Australia in 1939. The collection includes illustrations by Norman Lindsay, and was originally published in a limited print run of 500 copies.

The collection contains 20 poems, with all being published here for the first time.

== Contents ==
- "Five Bells"
- "Sleep"
- "To the Poetry of Hugh McCrae"
- "Last Trams (i)"
- "Last Trams (ii)"
- "Lesbia's Daughter"
- "Out of Time (i)"
- "Out of Time (ii)"
- "Out of Time (iii)"
- "North Country"
- "South Country"
- "William Street"
- "Cock-Crow"
- "The Knife"
- "To a Friend"
- "Vesper-Song of the Reverend Samuel Marsden"
- "Full Orchestra"
- "Advice to Psychologists"
- "Cannibal Street"
- "Sensuality"

== Critical reception ==
A review of the collection in The Sydney Morning Herald commented that the collection "goes far to confirm the high hopes entertained for him ever since his first verses appeared in papers and periodicals. Among living younger Australian poets, he has perhaps the keenest tense of rhythm, and he adopts modern technical devices with understanding and moderation, so that one never feels their intrusion."

On The Bulletin "Red Page" the reviewer noted that as "in the earlier works, Slessor appears in Five Bells in two roles, the humorist or satirist and the serious poet." They went on: "The lighter poems bounce in full daylight; the serious poems, partly because of Slessor’s preoccupation with Sydney Harbor, partly because it is the way he sees reality, move in a cold submarine light".

== See also ==
- 1939 in Australian literature
