= The Commercial Traveller's Wife =

Poem by Ronald McCuaig

- by Ronald McCuaig
- First published in: The Penguin Book of Australian Verse edited by John Thompson, Kenneth Slessor and R. G. Howarth (1958)
- Country: Australia
- Language: English
- Publication date: 1958

"The Commercial Traveller's Wife" is a poem by Australian poet Ronald McCuaig. It was first published in the anthology The Penguin Book of Australian Verse edited by John Thompson, Kenneth Slessor and R. G. Howarth in 1958, and later in the author's collections and in other Australian poetry anthologies.

== Outline ==
A neglected older woman makes a pass at the young man boarding with her and her husband. She is rejected and the young man then realises that he will have to move out and find another place to live.

== Analysis ==
In his commentary on the poem in 60 Classic Australian Poems Geoff Page praised the poet's " mastery of the colloquial", putting the opinion that McCuaig "was perhaps the first urban poet to use language in this way". He goes on to comment that this is a poem about the "everyday – and the shoddy moral compromises made by people who are fully human but have no particular claim to fame."

== Further publications ==
- The Ballad of Bloodthirsty Bessie and Other Poems by Ronald McCuaig, Angus and Robertson, 1961
- Australian Verse from 1805 : A Continuum edited by Geoffrey Dutton, 1976
- The Golden Apples of the Sun : Twentieth Century Australian Poetry edited by Chris Wallace-Crabbe, Melbourne University Press, 1980
- The Illustrated Treasury of Australian Verse edited by Beatrice Davis, Nelson, 1984
- Selected Poems by Ronald McCuaig, Angus and Robertson, 1992
- 60 Classic Australian Poems edited by Geoff Page, University of NSW Press, 2009
- Australian Poetry Since 1788 edited by Geoffrey Lehmann and Robert Gray, University of NSW Press, 2011

== Note ==
- You can watch the author reading his poem on YouTube.

== See also ==
- 1958 in poetry
- 1958 in literature
- 1958 in Australian literature
- Australian literature
