= Five Visions of Captain Cook =

Poem by Australian poet Kenneth Slessor

- by Kenneth Slessor
- Written: 1931
- First published in: Trio : A Book of Poems by Kenneth Slessor, Harley Matthews and Colin Simpson
- Country: Australia
- Language: English
- Publication date: 1931

"Five Visions of Captain Cook" (1931) is a poem by Australian poet Kenneth Slessor about James Cook. It was originally published in the poetry anthology Trio: A Book of Poems (authored by Kenneth Slessor, Harley Matthews and Colin Simpson), and later appeared two of the poet's collections and in numerous other poetry anthologies.

== Outline ==
The poem "builds the character of Captain James Cook from the reactions of those who sailed with him on his three major voyages."

== Reviews ==
In the essay "Kenneth Slessor: An Essay in Interpretation" (1997) A. K. Thompson noted: "The more carefully we read Cook's Journals the more impressive and convincing Slessor's reconstruction becomes and also the more unlikely it appears that Slessor was attempting to depict himself. Slessor also displays his great skill in marshalling the material that seems to him significant and it must be pointed out, especially in Slessor's case, that this marshalling and handling of significant material needs both skill and intelligence."

The Oxford Companion to Australian Literature stated that the poem was "Full of memorable lines that attest to Slessor's delight in language..and demonstrates that men who change the face of the world inevitably change the lives of those who associate with them."

In his book Reading Australian Poetry Andrew Taylor noted that in this poem "Cook's daemon is will, not imagination; his forté is action, not thought."

== Further publications ==
- Cuckooz Contrey by Kenneth Slessor (1932)
- One Hundred Poems : 1919-1939 by Kenneth Slessor (1944)
- An Anthology of Australian Verse edited by George Mackaness (1952)
- The Boomerang Book of Australian Poetry edited by Enid Moodie Heddle (1956)
- A Book of Australian Verse edited by Judith Wright (1956)
- Australian Poets Speak edited by Colin Thiele and Ian Mudie (1961)
- Modern Australian Verse edited by Douglas Stewart, Angus and Robertson, 1964 (excerpt only)
- A Book of Australian Verse edited by Judith Wright (1968)
- Poems by Kenneth Slessor (1975)
- The World's Contracted Thus edited by J. A. McKenzie and J. K. McKenzie (1983)
- My Country : Australian Poetry and Short Stories, Two Hundred Years edited by Leonie Kramer (1985)
- Cross-Country : A Book of Australian Verse edited by John Barnes and Brian MacFarlane, Heinemann, 1988
- Kenneth Slessor : Collected Poems Kenneth Slessor edited by Dennis Haskell and Geoffrey Dutton (1994)
- Antipodes : Poetic Responses edited by Margaret Bradstock (2011)
- Australian Poetry Since 1788 edited by Geoffrey Lehmann and Robert Gray (2011)

== See also ==
- 1931 in poetry
- 1931 in Australian literature
