= Five Days Old =

1958 poem by Australian poet Francis Webb

- by Francis Webb
- First published in: The Bulletin
- Country: Australia
- Language: English
- Publication date: 30 April 1958

"Five Days Old" (1958) is a poem by Australian poet Francis Webb.

It was originally published in The Bulletin on 30 April 1958, and was subsequently reprinted in the author's single-author collections and a number of Australian poetry anthologies.

According to The Oxford Companion to Australian Literature "The background to the poem, according to Webb's friend, Sister M. Francisa Fitz-Walter, was that a kindly doctor, hoping to renew Webb's interest in life and to restore his desire to write, placed a five-day old baby named Christopher John in Webb's arms."

== Critical reception ==
The Oxford Literary History of Australia wrote that Webb's "rich tapestry of metaphors and similes has contributed greatly to his popularity among his successors, some of whom might even have taken his mental condition as part of a true poet's inevitable alienation from modern society, or even from all society. 'Five Days Old' represents Webb in an unusually lyrical and publicly open mode."

== Publication history ==
After the poem's initial publication in The Bulletin magazine in 1958 it was reprinted as follows:

- Australian Poetry 1958 selected by Vincent Buckley, Angus and Robertson, 1958
- Socrates and Other Poems by Francis Webb, Angus and Robertson, 1961
- Modern Australian Verse edited by Douglas Stewart, Angus and Robertson, 1964
- New Impulses in Australian Poetry edited by Rodney Hall and Thomas Shapcott, University of Queensland Press, 1968
- A Book of Australian Verse edited by Judith Wright, Oxford University Press, 1968
- Collected Poems by Francis Webb, Angus and Robertson, 1969
- Modern Australian Poetry edited by David Campbell, Sun Books, 1970
- Twelve Poets, 1950-1970 edited by Alexander Craig, Jacaranda Press, 1971
- Australian Verse from 1805 : A Continuum edited by Geoffrey Dutton, Rigby, 1976
- Cross-Country : A Book of Australian Verse edited by John Barnes and Brian MacFarlane, Heinemann, 1984
- The Illustrated Treasury of Australian Verse edited by Beatrice Davis, Nelson, 1984
- My Country: Australian Poetry and Short Stories, Two Hundred Years edited by Leonie Kramer, Lansdowne, 1985
- Anthology of Australian Religious Poetry edited by Les Murray, Collins Dove, 1986
- Cap and Bells: The Poetry of Francis Webb edited by Michael Joseph Griffith and James A. McGlade, Angus and Robertson, 1991
- Australian Poetry in the Twentieth Century edited by Robert Gray and Geoffrey Lehmann, Heinemann, 1991
- Fivefathers: Five Australian Poets of the Pre-Academic Era edited by Les Murray, Carcanet, 1994
- The Oxford Book of Modern Australian Verse edited by Peter Porter, Oxford University Press, 1996
- Australian Verse: An Oxford Anthology edited by John Leonard, Oxford University Press, 1998
- Poems for All Occasions edited by Ron Pretty, Five Islands Press, 2002
- The Puncher & Wattmann Anthology of Australian Poetry edited by John Leonard, Puncher & Wattmann, 2009
- Australian Poetry Since 1788 edited by Geoffrey Lehmann and Robert Gray, University of NSW Press, 2011

The poem was also translated into Indonesian in 1991.

== Note ==
- The poem has an epigraph: "For Christopher"

== See also ==
- 1958 in Australian literature
- 1958 in poetry
