= South Country =

1939 poem by Australian poet Kenneth Slessor

- by Kenneth Slessor
- First published in: Five Bells : XX Poems
- Country: Australia
- Language: English
- Publication date: 1939
- Lines: 20

"South Country" (1939) is a poem by Australian poet Kenneth Slessor.

It was originally published in the poet's collection Five Bells : XX Poems, and was subsequently reprinted in the author's single-author collections and a number of Australian poetry anthologies.

== Synopsis ==
The poet lyrically travels from the inhabited fertile coastal strip of Australia ("the whey-faced anonymity/Of river-gums and scribbly-gums and bush") to the "South Country", the "flat earth of empty farms". This is a "monstrous continent", so huge "You walk on the sky's beach".

== Critical reception ==
In his Oxford University Press book about Slessor and his work, Adrian Caesar noted that the poet "conceives the trees as in an argument, but their doubts and quarrellings, the 'plots and pains' are ended by 'clear and gliding plains/Like an abrupt solution.'" He also commented that "As in 'North Country' the landscape is threatening, dealing in death and punishment.”

== Publication history ==
After the poem's initial publication Five Bells : XX Poems in 1939 it was reprinted as follows:

- One Hundred Poems : 1919-1939 by Kenneth Slessor, Angus and Robertson, 1944
- Poems by Kenneth Slessor, Angus and Robertson, 1957
- The Penguin Book of Australian Verse edited by John Thompson, Kenneth Slessor and R. G. Howarth, Penguin Books, 1958
- The Penguin Book of Australian Verse edited by Harry Heseltine, Penguin Books, 1972
- The Golden Apples of the Sun : Twentieth Century Australian Poetry edited by Chris Wallace-Crabbe, Melbourne University Press, 1980
- The Collins Book of Australian Poetry edited by Rodney Hall, Collins, 1981
- The World's Contracted Thus edited by J. A. McKenzie and J. K. McKenzie, Heinemann Education, 1983
- Cross-Country : A Book of Australian Verse edited by John Barnes and Brian MacFarlane, Heinemann, 1984
- My Country : Australian Poetry and Short Stories, Two Hundred Years edited by Leonie Kramer, Lansdowne, 1985
- Australian Poetry in the Twentieth Century edited by Robert Gray and Geoffrey Lehmann, Heinemann, 1991
- The Faber Book of Modern Australian Verse edited by Vincent Buckley, Faber, 1991
- The Penguin Book of Modern Australian Poetry edited by John Tranter and Philip Mead, Penguin, 1991
- Kenneth Slessor : Poetry, Essays, War Despatches, War Diaries, Journalism, Autobiographical Material and Letters edited by Dennis Haskell, University of Queensland Press, 1991
- Kenneth Slessor : Collected Poems by Kenneth Slessor, Angus and Robertson, 1994
- Fivefathers : Five Australian Poets of the Pre-Academic Era edited by Les Murray, Carcanet, 1994
- The Arnold Anthology of Post-Colonial Literatures in English edited by John Thieme, Arnold, 1996
- Australian Verse : An Oxford Anthology edited by John Leonard, Oxford University Press, 1998
- A Return to Poetry 2000 edited by Michael Duffy (2000)
- Sunlines : An Anthology of Poetry to Celebrate Australia's Harmony in Diversity edited by Anne Fairbairn, Dept of Immigration and Multicultural and Indigenous Affairs, 2002
- Little Book of Flowers edited by Della Thomas and Wendy Mehnert, National Library of Australia, 2002
- 100 Australian Poems You Need to Know edited by Jamie Grant, Hardie Grant, 2008
- Macquarie PEN Anthology of Australian Literature edited by Nicholas Jose, Kerryn Goldsworthy, Anita Heiss, David McCooey, Peter Minter, Nicole Moore, and Elizabeth Webby, Allen and Unwin, 2009
- The Puncher & Wattmann Anthology of Australian Poetry edited by John Leonard, Puncher & Wattmann, 2009

== Notes ==
- You can read the full text of the poem on the All Poetry website.

== See also ==
- "North Country" by Kenneth Slessor
- 1939 in Australian literature
- 1939 in poetry
