= 1932 in poetry =

Nationality words link to articles with information on the nation's poetry or literature (for instance, Irish or France).

== Events ==
- April 23 – Opening of Folger Shakespeare Library in Washington, D.C.
- April 26 – 32-year-old American poet Hart Crane throws himself overboard from the steamship Orizaba in the Gulf of Mexico en route from Mexico to New York in a state of alcoholic depression; his body is never recovered.
- July – W. B. Yeats leases Riversdale house in the Dublin suburb of Rathfarnham.
- In Vietnam, the New Poetry (Thơ mới) period begins, marked by an article and a poem of Phan Khôi, inaugurating modern literature in that country
- T. S. Eliot begins his 1932–33 Charles Eliot Norton Lectures at Harvard University (published in 1933 as The Use of Poetry and the Use of Criticism).

== Works published in English ==
=== Canada ===
- Dorothy Livesay, Signpost. Toronto: Macmillan.
- E. J. Pratt, Many Moods, Toronto: Macmillan.
- W. W. E. Ross, Sonnets.

=== India, in English ===
- Govind Krishna Chettur:
  - Gumataraya and other Sonnets for all Moods, Mangalore: Basel Mission Bookshop
  - The Temple tank and Other Poems, Mangalore: Basel Mission Bookshop
  - The Triumph of Love: A Sonnet Sequence, Mangalore: Basel Mission Bookshop
- Baldoon Dhingra, Beauty's Sanctuary, Lahore: Civil and Military Gazette Press
- Theodore W. La Touche, The Lion Kings of Lanka, Secunderabad: self-published
- Manjeri Sundaraman Manjeri, Saffron and Gold and Other Poems, Madras: Shakti Karyalayam
- Nanikram Vasanmal Thadani, The Garden of the East, Karachi: Bharat Publishing House

=== United Kingdom ===
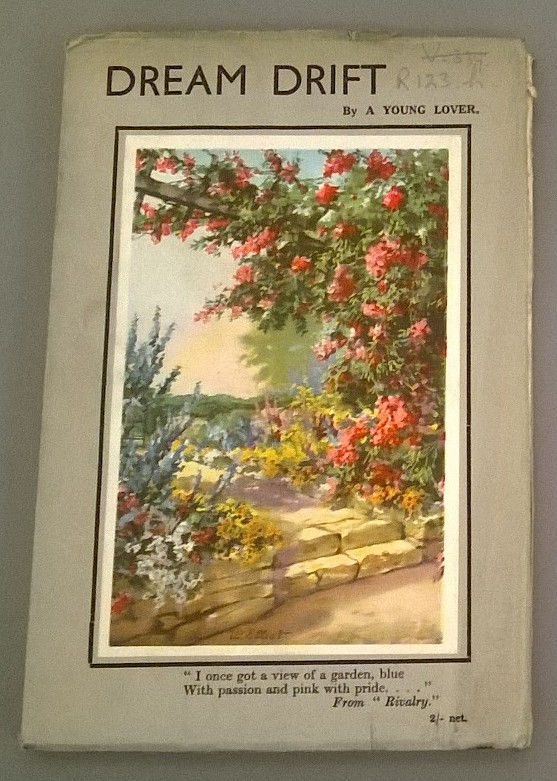
Dream Drift by a Young Lover, by Aeneas Francon Williams, published 1932, 1st Edition copy

- Æ, pen name of George William Russell, Song and its Fountains
- Edmund Blunden, Halfway House
- W. H. Auden, The Orators: An English study
- Roy Campbell, Pomegranates
- W. H. Davies, Poems, 1930–31
- Lord Alfred Douglas and others, ed. by John Gawsworth, Known Signatures: new poems
- Lawrence Durrell, Ten Poems
- T. S. Eliot, Selected Essays 1917–1932, criticism
- Thomas Hardy, Collected Poems
- Julian Huxley, The Captive Shrew and other Poems of a Biologist
- F. R. Leavis, New Bearings in English Poetry attacks late Victorian and Georgian poetry and praises Ezra Pound, T. S. Eliot, and other modernists
- Hugh MacDiarmid, pen name of Christopher Murray Grieve, Second Hymn to Lenin, and Other Poems
- William Plomer, The Fivefold Screen
- Aeneas Francon Williams, Dream Drift, by a Young Lover
- S. Fowler Wright, The Life Of Sir Walter Scott, biography
- W. B. Yeats, Words for Music Perhaps, and Other Poems, Irish poet published in the United Kingdom

=== United States ===
- W. H. Auden, The Orators
- Sterling Brown, Southern Road
- Mary Elizabeth Frye, "Do Not Stand at My Grave and Weep"
- Langston Hughes, Scotsboro Limited, verse drama
- Robinson Jeffers, Thurso's Landing and Other Poems
- Archibald MacLeish, Conquistador
- Marianne Moore, "No Swan So Fine"
- Edward Arlington Robinson, Nicodemus
- Allen Tate, Poems: 1928–1931
- Sara Teasdale, A Country House
- William Carlos Williams, The Cod Head

=== Other in English ===
- Kenneth Slessor, Cuckooz Contrey, Sydney: Frank Johnson, Australia
- W. B. Yeats, Words for Music Perhaps, Irish poet published in the United Kingdom

== Works published in other languages ==
=== France ===
- André Breton, Le Revolver a chevaux blancs
- Paul Éluard, La Vie immédiate
- Tristan Tzara, pen name of Sami Rosenstock, Où hoivent les loups

=== Indian subcontinent ===
Including all of the British colonies that later became India, Pakistan, Bangladesh, Sri Lanka and Nepal. Listed alphabetically by first name, regardless of surname:

==== Hindi ====
- Sumitranandan Pant, Gunjana, including many popular Hindi poems such as "Nauka Vihar", "Ek Tara", "Candni", "Madhuvan"
- Rama Nath Jyotisi, Mahabharat Mahakavya, epic Hindi poem based on the Mahabharata, with new interpretations of the episodes
- Mahadevi Varma, Rasmi, 35 Hindi poems of the Chayavadi romantic poetry movement in Indian literature

==== Other Indian languages ====
- Adibhatta Narayandas, translator, Rubaiyat, from Edward Fitzgerald's English translation into Sanskrit and Telugu, with the text in Persian and Roman lettering
- Anil, also known as "Atmaram Raoji Deshpande", Phulavat, the author's first book of poetry; mostly love poems; Marathi
- D. R. Bendre, also known as "Ambikatanayadatta", Gari, 55 poems, marked by an unusual level of abstraction, metrical experiments and metaphorical language; Kannada
- Mahjoor, Bagh e Nisata Kae Gulo, poem on the charms of the Dal Lake; Kashmiri
- Mathura Prasad Dikshit, editor, Govinda Gitavali, collection of Govindadasa's 17th-century devotional songs and others in the Maithili-language oral tradition
- Maulvi Abdul Haq, editor, Jangnamah-yi Alam Ali Khan, an 18th-century Urdu narrative poem (masnavi) published for the first time; includes introductory material
- Premendra Mitra, Prathama, the author's first book of poetry; Bengali
- Rabindranath Thakur, Punasca, in this and in some of the author's other books in the mid-1930s, he introduced a new rhythm in poetry that "had a tremendous impact on the modern poets", according to Indian anthologist and academic Sisir Kumar Das; Bengali
- Rallapalli Anantha Krishna Sharma, translator, Salivahana gatha saptasati saramu, translated from the Prakrit of Hāla's Gaha Sattasai into Telugu, in "ataveladi" meter; according to academic and anthologist Sisir Kumar Das, writing in 1995, the work "is still considered a model for poetical translation"
- K. Shankara Bhat, Nalme, three long narrative poems in Kannada on tragic subjects: Honniya maduve ("Marriage of Honni"), depicting village life in coastal Karnataka; Madriya Cite ("Pyre of Madri"), on the tragic end of Madri, wife of Pandu
- Shyamananda Jha, editor, Maithili Sandes, anthology of patriotic Maithili poetry
- T. N. Shreekantayya, Olume, Kannada work including translations from Greek and Pakrit

=== Spanish language ===
==== Spain ====
- Vicente Aleixandre, Espadas como Labios ("Swords or/as Lips")
- Miguel Hernández, Perito en lunas ("Expert in Moon Matters")
- María Pemán, Elegía de la tradición de Españia ("Elegy of Spain's Tradition")

==== Latin America ====
- Luis Fabio Xammar, Las voces armoniosas, Peru

=== Other languages ===
- Boris Pasternak, The Second Birth, Russia
- Sir Muhammad Iqbal, The Javed Nama (Book of Eternity) in Persian, inspired by Dante's Divine Comedy
- Eugenio Montale, La casa dei doganieri e altre poesie, a chapbook of five poems published in association with the award of the Premio del Antico Fattore to Montale; Florence: Vallecchi; Italy
- Giorgos Seferis, Στέρνα (The Cistern), Greece

== Awards and honors ==
- Pulitzer Prize for Poetry: George Dillon: The Flowering Stone

== Births ==
Death years link to the corresponding "[year] in poetry" article:

- January 2 – Peter Redgrove (died 2003), English poet
- January 5 – Douglas Livingstone (died 1996), Malaysian-born South African poet
- January 19 – George MacBeth (died 1992) Scottish-born poet and novelist
- February 6 – Shankha Ghosh (died 2021), Bengali poet and critic
- February 12 – Hugh Fox, (died 2011), American novelist and poet, a founder of the Pushcart Prize
- March 18 – John Updike (died 2009), American novelist, short story writer, essayist, poet and writer
- April 10 – Adrian Henri (died 2000), English member of the Liverpool poets
- April 11 – Bienvenido Lumbera (died 2021), Filipino poet, critic and dramatist
- May 6 – Alauddin Al-Azad (died 2009), Bengali novelist, writer, poet, literary critic and academic
- May 7
  - Jenny Joseph (died 2018), English poet
  - Yadollah Royaee (died 2022), Iranian poet
- May 25 – Patrick Cullinan (died 2011), South African poet
- May 27 – Linda Pastan (died 2023), American poet
- June 18 – Geoffrey Hill (died 2016), English poet and academic at Boston University
- June 29
  - Philip Hobsbaum (died 2005), English teacher, poet and critic
  - Ror Wolf (died 2020), German poet and writer
- July 10 – Martin Green (died 2015), English author, poet and publisher
- July 18 – Yevgeny Yevtushenko (died 2017), Soviet Russian poet and writer
- July 21 – Marie-Claire Bancquart (died 2019), French poet and critic
- August 16 – Christopher Okigbo (died in Biafran War 1967), Nigerian poet
- September 18 – Henri Meschonnic (died 2009), French poet, linguist, translator and theoretician
- September 13 – Eugene Perkins (died 2023), African-American poet
- October 9 – Seda Vermisheva (died 2020), Soviet Armenian-Russian poet, economist and activist
- October 17 – Rosemary Tonks (died 2014), English poet
- October 20 – Michael McClure (died 2020), American poet and playwright
- October 24 – Adrian Mitchell (died 2008), English poet and playwright
- October 27 – Sylvia Plath (suicide 1963), American-born poet and novelist (The Bell Jar)
- December 11 – Keith Waldrop (died 2023), American poet, prose stylist, visual artist; with wife Rosmarie Waldrop, founding editor of the influential and innovative Burning Deck Press
- Also:
  - Jergen Becker, German poet
  - Lena Pappa (died 2025), Greek poet
  - Linda M. Stitt (died 2020), Canadian poet

== Deaths ==
Birth years link to the corresponding "[year] in poetry" article:

- February 22 – Harriet Converse Moody, 74 (born 1857), American patron of the arts
- March 16 – Harold Monro, 53 (born 1879), English poet and proprietor of the Poetry Bookshop in London which helped many famous poets bring their work before the public
- April 8 – Hubert Church, 74 (born 1857), Australian poet
- April 27 – Hart Crane, 32 (born 1899), American poet, by suicide
- June 21 – حافظ إبراهيم Hafez Ibrahim, 60 (born 1871), Egyptian "poet of the Nile"
- August 29 – Raymond Knister, 33 (born 1899), Canadian novelist, short story writer and poet, drowned in a swimming accident
- October 5 – Christopher Brennan, 61 (born 1870), Australian poet
- October 14 – أحمد شوقي Ahmed Shawqi, 64 (born 1868), Egyptian poet
- November 19 – Clinton Scollard, 72 (born 1860), American poet
- December 18 – Edmund Vance Cooke, 66 (born 1866), Canadian American poet

== See also ==
- Poetry
- List of poetry awards
- List of years in poetry
- New Objectivity in German literature and art
