= Books and Authors =

- Genre: Talk show
- Presented by: Colin Simpson
- Country of origin: Australia
- Original language: English

Production
- Running time: 15 minutes

Original release
- Network: ATN-7
- Release: December 1956 – 1 September 1957

Books and Authors is an Australian television series which aired from December 1956 to September 1957. Broadcast live on Sydney station ATN-7 in a fifteen-minute time-slot on Sundays, the series focused on the authors of books. It is not known if any of the episodes were kinescoped.

== Format ==
In each episode, Colin Simpson interviewed a different author.

== Reception ==
The Australian Women's Weekly gave the program 2 stars, with reviewer R.C. Packer saying that "although the show is a good one, I can't help wondering why people would want to spend 15 minutes discussing a book or author when they can get just as much out of a book review in five minutes"

== Time-slot ==
The time-slot changed several times during the run of the series. For example, on 3 February 1957 the series aired at 6:45PM, with competition in the time-slot consisting of U.S. western series Hopalong Cassidy on TCN-9, as ABN-2 did not offer any programs between 6:00PM to 7:00PM during that period. By 1 September 1957 Books and Authors aired at 5:45PM, competition in the time-slot consisting of U.S. series Florian Zabach on ABN-2 and locally produced series The N.R.M.A Show on TCN-9.
