= United Commercial Travellers Association =

The United Commercial Travellers' Association of Australia or United Commercial Travellers' Association of Australasia was an Australian tradesmen's association.

== History ==
The association was formed in 1895. Its headquarters were established in Melbourne, in the facilities of the Commercial Travellers' Association of Victoria, which was formed in 1880. Affiliated organisations also existed in South Australia, which was the first to be established in 1866, followed by New South Wales (1883), Queensland (1884), Western Australia (1896) and Tasmania (1900). Its remit was aiding salesmen travelling across the country on train or carriage, providing increased protection from doubtful accommodation or business practices.

A brief note in the Brisbane Courier at the time of Incorporation in 1905 states the constitution was unanimously adopted by all associations at large public meetings.

"On July 11, 1907—that sounds almost in the dim ages—the very first paid-for telephone conversation on the newly opened Sydney-Melbourne trunk line was between the C.T.As. of New South Wales and Victoria, and it cost 6/- for three minutes.

Only the South Australian branch is still in operation.

== Publications ==
The Australasian Traveller (1905– ) was the official organ of the UCTAA, replacing magazines of the constituent associations:

- The Traveller (Victoria)
- By Road and Sea (New South Wales)
- The Commercial (Western Australia)

Its annual, Australia Today, was praised.

== International connections ==
- New Zealand
- Great Britain
- Canada
- South Africa

== Significant buildings ==
- Melbourne - Commerce House, Flinders St, which now houses a hotel.
- Brisbane - Telecommunications House

== Notable members and office bearers ==
- Edwin Thomas Smith, M.P., Mayor of Adelaide 1879–1882
- James Davies ( –1931), chief secretary of the Association, Secretary of the Victorian Commercial Travellers' Association, and editor of The Australasian Traveller, and the annual Australia Today A bronze bust by Paul R. Montford was erected in his honor in Brisbane.

== Closure ==
The organisation was wound up in 2014. Nic Price reported in the Melbourne Leader that the Victorian branch donated more than $500,000 to charities.
