= Cuckooz Contrey =

1932 poetry collection by Kenneth Slessor

- Author: Kenneth Slessor
- Language: English
- Genre: Poetry collection
- Publisher: Frank Johnson Ltd.
- Publication date: 1932
- Publication place: Australia
- Media type: Print
- Pages: 77 pp.

Cuckooz Contrey is a poetry collection by Australian poet Kenneth Slessor, published by Frank Johnson Ltd. in Australia in 1932. The collection was originally published in a limited print run of 500 copies, and is number 2 of the Jacaranda Tree Books of Australian Verse.

The collection contains 41 poems, with all but one ("Five Visions of Captain Cook") being published here for the first time.

== Contents ==
- "The Atlas : 1 : the King of Cuckooz"
- "The Atlas : 2 : Post-Roads"
- "The Atlas : 3 : Dutch Seacoast"
- "The Atlas : 4 : Mermaids"
- "The Atlas : 5 : the Seafight"
- "Captain Dobbin"
- "Talbingo"
- "Gulliver"
- "Crow Country"
- "Glubbdubdrib"
- "The Nabob (to the Memory of William Hickey, Esq.)"
- "Five Visions of Captain Cook"
- "A Bushranger"
- "The Country Ride"
- "Elegy in a Botanic Gardens"
- "Toilet of a Dandy"
- "Serenade"
- "Sentimental Soliloquy"
- "Wild Grapes"
- "Waters"
- "Burying Friends"
- "Metempsychosis"
- "Rubens' Hell"
- "La Dame du Palais de la Reine"
- "Country Towns"
- "Mephistopheles Perverted (or Goethe for the Times)"
- "Crustacean Rejoinder"
- "Trade Circular (to the Poets' Ladies)"
- "Fixed Ideas"
- "The Old Play : I"
- "The Old Play : II"
- "The Old Play : III"
- "The Old Play : IV"
- "The Old Play : V"
- "The Old Play : VI"
- "The Old Play : VII"
- "The Old Play : VIII"
- "The Old Play : IX"
- "The Old Play : X"
- "The Old Play : XI"
- "The Old Play : XII"

== Critical reception ==
A reviewer in The Sydney Morning Herald noted that "Mr. Slessor has the gift of words and imagination. When he keeps control of them he writes very good poetry. But when, as now and again happens, he allows them to take control of him, the effect produced is one of preciosity and artificiality."

Reviewing the collection for The Bulletin Hugh McCrae was full of praise: "Of Slessor’s book itself remains this firm impression: times have changed favorably since the 'sixties—since the 'seventies—: and where, once, half a dozen men offered matches to light a gaselier, a youngster of our own period lays his finger to a button; and, immediately, it is as though we had been given new eyes, new minds; and, through consequences, a new universe."

== See also ==
- 1932 in Australian literature

== Notes ==
- Norman Lindsay's etching 'Cuckooz Contrey' appears as frontispiece
- Adele J. Haft examines maps and mapping in the poet's sequence "The Atlas", and "begins by considering what critics have said about 'The King of Cuckooz', traces its development in Slessor’s poetry notebook, and details the complex relationships between his poem, Norton’s map, and a particularly lyrical description of that map in an ephemeral catalogue of atlases and maps.
