= Lena Pappa =

Greek poet (1932–2025)

Lena Pappa

Lena Pappa (Greek: Λένα Παππά; 31 July 1932 – 19 July 2025) was a Greek poet.

== Life and career ==
Pappa was born in Athens in 31 July 1932 . She initially worked as an administrative officer in the Secretariat of ASDY and then was appointed to the Athens School of Fine Arts, where she served as Library Curator and assistant to Professor of Art History, Pantelis Prevelakis. From 1980 to 1990 she served as the Head of the Secretariat of the Athens School of Fine Arts (General Secretary).

She was a member of the National Society of Greek Writers and a founding member of the Delphic Academy.

Pappa died in Athens on 19 July 2025, at the age of 92.
