= Colin Simpson (Australian journalist) =

Australian journalist (1908–1983)

Edwin Colin Simpson OBE
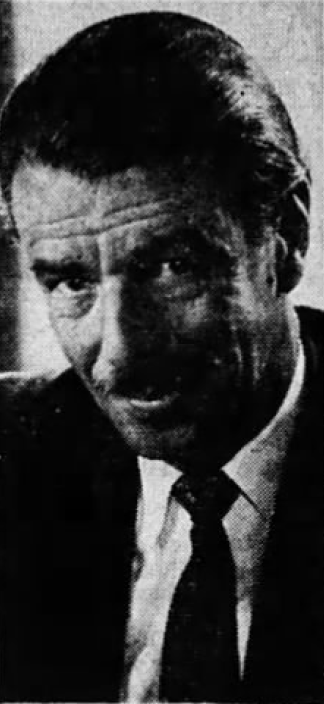
- Born: Edwin Colin Simpson; 4 November 1908; Petersham, Australia
- Died: 8 February 1983 (aged 74); Kirribilli, New South Wales, Australia
- Other name: Colin Simpson
- Occupations: Journalist, author and traveller

Edwin Colin Simpson OBE (4 November 1908 – 8 February 1983), known professionally by his pen name Colin Simpson, was an Australian journalist, author and traveller. After a successful career as a journalist with Sydney newspapers and a writer of radio documentaries for the Australian Broadcasting Commission, he became a freelance writer of "popular travel books" which sold more than half a million copies. He was "instrumental in securing the Public Lending Right legislation" for Australian authors.

== Early life and education ==
Simpson was born Edwin Colin Simpson in Petersham, a suburb in the inner west of Sydney. His parents were Henry Frank Simpson, a mechanic, and his wife Margaret Olive, née Langby, a nurse.

Simpson moved with his mother to live in the small New South Wales gold mining town of Hill End, where he would spend most of his childhood. He attended the Kogarah Intermediate High School.

== Career as journalist ==
His first job was as a copywriter in the advertising agency, Catts-Patterson Co. Ltd., and he then worked as a journalist, contributing to Sydney newspapers including Daily Guardian, Daily Telegraph, Smith's Weekly and the Sunday newspapers.

In 1931 his long poem "Infidelities" was published in Trio, a "slim but elegant" book of poetry to which the poets Kenneth Slessor and Harley Matthews also contributed.

In 1938 he helped establish the Australian pictorial magazine Pix and the "Fact" supplement of the Sydney Sun newspaper. In 1941 he and Tess van Sommers were responsible for an article in The Sun's "Fact" supplement exposing the Ern Malley literary hoax.

In 1944 he went to the United States to report on the founding of the United Nations organisation and to study American magazine publishing techniques. While there he conducted interviews with celebrities including John L. Lewis, Claire Booth Luce, Billy Rose, Frank Sinatra and Henry Wallace.

In 1947 Simpson began a three-year stint working for the Australian Broadcasting Commission. He travelled to all parts of Australia, to the nearby islands of the South Pacific and to Borneo, gathering materials and writing radio documentaries mostly for the ABC's Australian Walkabout programme.

For a 1948 documentary he visited British North Borneo, retracing the trail of the Sandakan-Ranou death marches during the Second World War and later recording the memories of six survivors. The script was later published as Six from Borneo (1948).

For another documentary in the same year he joined the anthropologist Charles P. Mountford's American-Australian Scientific Expedition to Arnhem Land during which he taped Australian "Aboriginal rituals and songs never before heard on Australian radio..., along with Australian birdlife".

== Career as writer ==
His employment with the Australian Broadcasting Commission came to an end in 1950 when his contract was not renewed due to budget cuts instituted by the Australian government's treasury department. He decided to write books for a living. Inspired by his travels for Australian Walkabout, his first book was Adam in Ochre (1951) concerning the Australian Aborigines and that was followed by Adam with Arrows (1953) and Adam in Plumes (1954), both on the peoples of New Guinea. Those books sold very well. They were not "authoritative contributions to anthropology" but simply aimed to "interpret" these indigenous peoples "to the layman".

In 1952 he had written a novel Come Away, Pearler which sold out its first edition of 6,000 copies and was twice optioned for adaption as a film, but he did not write any further novels.

From the mid fifties he became a freelance travel writer and wrote a series of travel books on overseas countries, including The Country Upstairs (1956) on Japan, Wake Up in Europe (1959), Asia's Bright Balconies (1962), The Viking Circle (1967) on Scandinavia and Blue Africa (1981). In these books, written for the international market, he wrote "from a distinctively Australian point of view" but he "rejected the strident Australianness" of writers such as Frank Clune. He preferred to project a sophisticated image of himself, as a person with an interest in the world at large and in the arts and "frank about sex".

During his lifetime his books "sold more than 500,000 copies" and were republished in the United States, the United Kingdom, New Zealand, Japan and the Scandinavian countries, and in many translations.

In 1963 Simpson was a founding member and for a period vice-president of the Australian Society of Authors (ASA) and he was a supporter of Australian authors' public lending rights (PLR), with that right being achieved following the Australian federal government's enacting of the Public Lending Right Scheme in 1974.

The ASA established the annual Colin Simpson Lecture to commemorate "the journalist and author Colin Simpson, a founding member of the ASA, the driving force behind the introduction of Public Lending Right in 1975, and an accomplished travel writer and television host". A range of "illustrious... luminaries" from the Australian writing, publishing and journalism communities have delivered this lecture.

== Honours ==
- 1981 Birthday Honours: Order of the British Empire (OBE) – for service to literature and journalism

== Personal life ==
In 1938 Simpson married Estelle Maud "Claire" Waterman, a graphic artist who would during his career contribute illustrations to his published books. She predeceased him in 1976. He had two daughters, Julie and Vivien. He died on 8 February 1983 in Kirribilli Private Hospital.

== Bibliography ==
=== Early works ===
- Trio : A Book of Poems, Sydney : Sunnybrook Press, 1931. Joint contributors: Kenneth Slessor and Harley Matthews.
- The Caesar of the Akies : The Life Story of Sir Charles Kingsford Smith, M.C., A.F.C., London : Cassell, 1937. Written in collaboration with Beau Sheil.
- Six from Borneo : Documentary Drama of the Death Marches, Australian Broadcasting Commission, 1948; online copy here (State Library Victoria)

=== Australia and Melanesia ===
- Adam in Ochre : Inside Aboriginal Australia, Sydney: Angus & Robertson, 1951.
- Come Away, Pearler, Sydney: Angus and Robertson, 1952. With decorations by Claire Simpson.
- Adam with Arrows : Inside New Guinea, Sydney: Angus & Robertson, 1953.
- Adam in Plumes, Sydney: Angus and Robertson, 1954.
- Islands of Men : A Six-Part Book About Life in Melanesia, Sydney: Angus and Robertson, 1954. Illustrated with 12 colour-plates, other graphs, and with line decorations by Claire Simpson.

=== The wider world ===
- The Country Upstairs: Japan Today with a Philippine Interlude, Sydney : Angus and Robertson, 1956. With decorations by Claire Simpson.
- Wake Up in Europe : A Book of Travel for Australians and New Zealanders, Sydney : Angus and Robertson, 1960.
- Show Me a Mountain : The Rise of an Australian Company, Ampol, Sydney : Angus and Robertson, 1961.
- Asia's Bright Balconies : Hong Kong, Macao, Philippines, Sydney : Angus & Robertson, 1962. With decoration drawings by Claire Simpson.
- Take Me to Spain, including Majorca and with a Sampling of Portugal, Sydney : Angus & Robertson, 1963. Maps by Josephine Mayo, line decorations by Claire Simpson.
- Take Me to Russia and Central Asian Republics of the Soviet Union, Sydney : Angus & Robertson, 1964.
- The Viking Circle : Denmark, Greenland, Norway, Sweden, Finland, Iceland, London: Hodder & Stoughton, 1967.
- Greece : The Unclouded Eye, Sydney : Angus & Robertson, 1968.
- The Secret Lives of Lawrence of Arabia, London: Nelson, 1969; London: Panther, 1971. Joint author: Phillip Knightley.
- The New Australia, Sydney : Angus & Robertson, 1972.
- Bali and Beyond, Sydney : Angus & Robertson, 1972.
- Off to Asia : Singapore, Malaysia, Hong Kong, Macau, Sydney : Angus & Robertson, 1973.
- Pleasure Islands of the South Pacific, Sydney: Methuen, 1979.
- Blue Africa : Travel in South Africa, Zimbabwe, Kenya, Tanzania, plus Indian Ocean Islands of Mauritius, Madagascar, Reunion, Seychelles, Cammeray, N.S.W. : Horwitz Grahame, 1981.

== See also ==
- Books and Authors
