= Seda Vermisheva =

Armenian-Russian poet (1932–2020)

- Born: 9 October 1932; Tiflis, Soviet Georgia
- Died: 18 February 2020 (aged 87)
- Occupations: poet, economist and public activist

Seda Vermisheva (Armenian: Սեդա Վերմիշևա; Russian: Сэда Константиновна Вермишева, 9 October 1932 – 18 February 2020) was an Armenian-Russian poet, economist and public activist.

== Biography ==
From her father's side, she was a descendant of the Argutinsky-Dolgorukov family. Vermisheva was born in Tiflis, but lived all her life in Moscow. She studied at the Yerevan State University, Department of Economics. Then she worked in the Soviet Institute of Economics and Planning as a senior advisor.

She was the author of 8 poetic books and numerous analytical articles. Since 1974 she was a member of the Union of Soviet Writers. Then she headed the Russian-speaking section of the Writers Union of Armenia and was a member of the Union of Writers of Moscow. She was the co-chairman of Moscow society for Armenian-Russian friendship.

Seda Vermisheva was the author of the "Tectonics of External and Internal Borders of the USSR" (Library of Russian-Armenian initiatives Centre, M., 1997) book that focuses on the "deliberate Turkic-Moslem tendency in the state-territorial structure of the USSR".

== Books ==
- Solntse stoit vysoko (1971);
- Mertsayushchii punktir (1974);
- Listya (1982);
- Naskal’nyi ornament (1988);
- Nagor’e (1990);
- Scherbataya klinopis' (1999);
- Iz kamnya i peska (2005).
