= Edward Sorenson =

Australian writer and poet

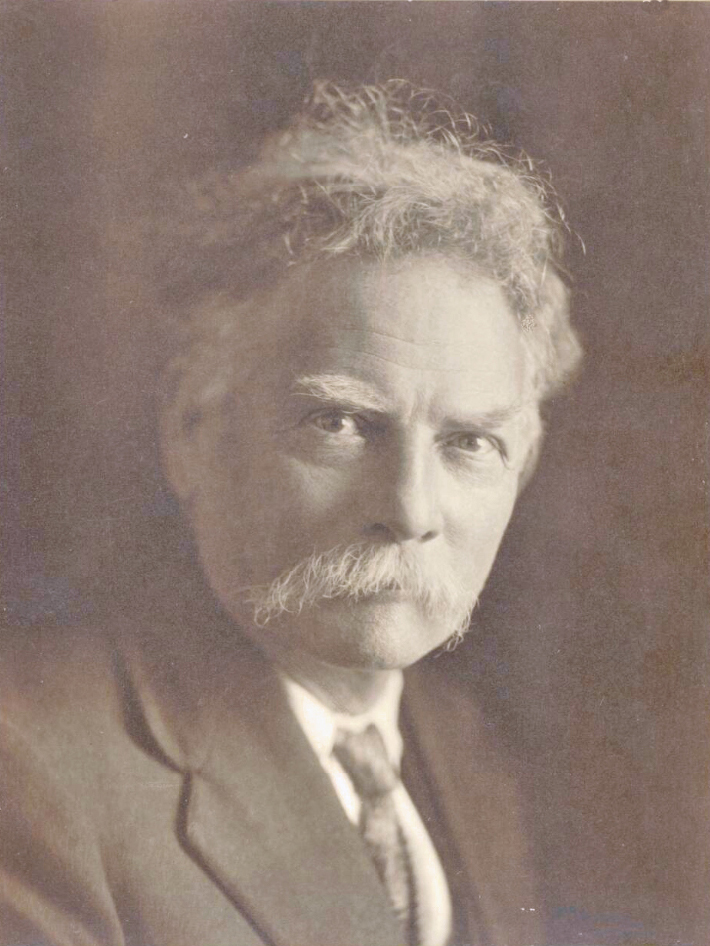
Edward Sorenson in 1927

Edward Sylvester Sorenson (24 September 1869 − 19 December 1939), was an Australian writer and poet.

Sorenson was born on 24 September 1869 at Dyraaba, New South Wales, north-west of Casino, a son of Jacob Sorenson and his wife, Mary Ann, née Keleher. As a young man he wandered throughout Queensland, prospecting for gold and working on sheep stations. He later travelled throughout South Australia, Victoria and New South Wales, along the way deciding to make a career of writing. To this end he settled in Sydney where he studied as an evening student at a commercial college.

From 1885, he contributed both stories and verse to magazines, including The Bulletin, The Lone Hand, The Sydney Morning Herald and the Catholic Press, being encouraged by the founder of The Bulletin, J. F. Archibald. Much of his work, including poetry, sketches, short stories and articles, remains uncollected.

Sorenson's Life in the Australian Backblocks (London, 1911) is an account of bush life by a writer with practical knowledge of the subject. He also wrote stories featuring Australian wildlife. He was a member of the Royal Australasian Ornithologists' Union and the Royal Zoological Society of New South Wales and the Fellowship of Australian Writers.

H. M. Green in his An Outline of Australian Literature (1930), said of Sorenson that he knew "outback life better than most." Certainly, few Australian authors, not even Henry Lawson or "Steele Rudd," had a more varied experience of bush-life than Sorenson.

On 31 December 1910, he married Alice Newlyn, née Gibbs, a widow, at the Congregational Church, Waterloo, Sydney. They had two children together, Harold and Tarella.

Sorenson's wife, Alice, died on 14 April 1939 at Marrickville, aged 68 years. In an obituary, a friend, Alexander Vennard, wrote that "Mrs. Sorenson was a daughter of the bush who had worked on big pastoral runs before she met the man from the droving tracks who became her husband, and later one of the most prolific writers in the history of Australian literature. I always did think, despite her many years residence in a Sydney suburb, that Mrs. Sorenson would have preferred to be back again in the country where her early days were spent...She always found time to exchange a few words with a writer from North Queensland, and make him feel at home."

Survived by a son and daughter, Edward Sorenson died of coronary disease at his Marrickville home on 19 December 1939, aged 70 years, and was buried in the Anglican section of Rookwood Cemetery.

== Bibliography ==
Novels and Serialised Stories

- Aunt Jo: A Love Story of the Cedar Scrubs (1906)
- The Squatter's Ward (1908)
- The Squatter King (1914)
- On The Wallaby: The Diary of a Queensland Swagman (1915)
- A Backblocker's Pleasure Trip (1917)
- The Mystery of Murrawang: A Tale of Two Stations (1917)

Short Story Collections

- Quinton's Rouseabout and Other Stories (1908)
- Life In The Australian Backblocks (1911)
- Chips and Splinters (1919) (short stories and verse)
- Friends and Foes in the Australian Bush (1919)
- Spotty the Bower-Bird and Other Stories (1921)
- Karaway the Cockatoo and Other Nature Stories (1922)
- Murty Brown (1925)

Non Fiction

- The Kookaburra (1902)
- The Shepherds' Dance: With the Lamb-Markers of the Paroo (1914)
- How Our Men Earn a Living in the Bush (1915)
