= Eric Irvin =

Australian writer (1908–1993)

- Born: Eric Robert Irvin; 30 November 1908; Newtown, New South Wales
- Died: 1 July 1993 (aged 84); Brisbane, Queensland

Eric Irvin (30 November 1908 – 1 July 1993) was an Australian writer and historian of Australian theatre. His Dictionary of the Australian Theatre 1788–1914 is an essential reference work. He was also an anthologised poet who published two books of poetry.

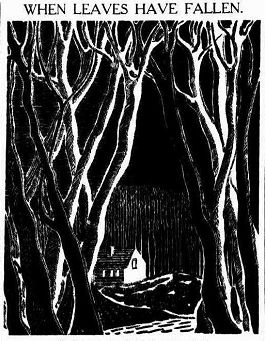
Illustration by Eric Irvin for his "When leaves have fallen", The Sydney Morning Herald, Saturday 8 April 1939, page 11. Acknowledgment: National Library of Australia.

== Early life and war service ==
Eric Robert Irvin was born 30 November 1908 in Newtown, New South Wales. After attending Bondi Public School, he was apprenticed to a Bondi chemist in 1922 while studying at night at Waverley Grammar school. He enrolled in East Sydney Technical College classes in art and window display and worked in various department stores. He battled for much of the depression years before gaining a post teaching art in Catholic girls' schools in the mid-1930s. On 31 May 1940 he enlisted with the 7th Australian Divisional Signals and saw service in the Middle East and Papua New Guinea where he took part in the Kokoda Trail, Buna and Ramu Valley campaigns. He was discharged with rank of Lieutenant on 29 November 1945.

In this period he had poems accepted for publication, much of the early poems in the Sydney Morning Herald and his war-time poetry in the Bulletin. From New Guinea he had a survey of war-time poetry, "Australian Poets of This War" published in The Australian Quarterly. His own first volume, A Soldier's Miscellany, was accepted for publication but delayed until 1945 by the war-time paper shortage.

== Wagga Wagga ==
Irvin secured a position as Secretary, Wagga Wagga School of Arts for whom he produced and set-designed various plays. He then joined local Daily Advertiser as a journalist and, in 1961, the sub-editor. During this time he continued to write poetry and also wrote three local histories, Place of Many Crows (1953), The Murrumbidgee Turf Club (1960), and Early inland agriculture (1962), and edited a collection of articles written by anonymous contributors to the Wagga Wagga Advertiser and Riverine Reporter (1868–1875), Letters from the river (1959).

== Return to Sydney ==
Securing a position as sub-editor with the Sydney Morning Herald, Irvin returned to Sydney with his family in 1962. He retired from the Herald in 1973.

In 1968 came his second volume of poetry, A suit for everyman. However, his main output was as a historian of the Australian theatre focussing on the lives of actors, the production mechanics and architecture of the theatres published in numerous articles in scholarly Australian, English and American journals and his books: in 1971, a history of Georgian theatre in Australia, Theatre comes to Australia; a biography of actor George Darrell (1841–1921), Gentleman George, king of melodrama in 1980; Australian melodrama in 1981; and in 1985 the Dictionary of the Australian Theatre 1788–1914 (1984). In 1979 he edited with an historical introduction, Walter Cooper's play Colonial experience which was first performed at the Royal Victoria Theatre, Sydney, in 1868.

He also produced Sydney as it might have been : dreams that died on the drawing-board in 1974. Drawing largely from the back issues of The Sydney Morning Herald and its sister publications, he described the architecture of Sydney which had been imagined but not built, as he wrote, because the dreams were "defeated again and again by lack of money, political in-fighting, some power struggle or other, or the fluxion of time".

== Last years ==
In 1989, Irvin moved to Brisbane. He was awarded an honorary Doctor of Letters from the University of Queensland for services to Australian theatre in 1989.

He died in Brisbane on 1 July 1993.

== Publications ==
Irvin's books are:

- A Soldier's Miscellany (poems), Sydney, Angus and Robertson, 1945
- Place of many crows : a brief history of the foundation of Wagga Wagga, N.S.W., Wagga Wagga, The Daily Advertiser, 1953
- The Murrumbidgee Turf Club: its early history, Wagga Wagga, The Daily Advertiser, 1960
- Early inland agriculture : farming in the southern districts of New South Wales, Wagga Wagga, self-published, 1962
- A suit for everyman (poems), Brisbane, Jacaranda, 1968
- Theatre comes to Australia, St. Lucia, University of Queensland Press, 1971
- Sydney as it might have been : dreams that died on the drawing-board, Sydney, Alpha Books, 1974
- Gentleman George, king of melodrama : the theatrical life and times of George Darrell, 1841–1921, St. Lucia, University of Queensland Press, 1980
- Australian melodrama : eighty years of popular theatre, Sydney, Hale and Iremonger, 1981
- Dictionary of the Australian Theatre 1788–1914, Sydney, Hale and Iremonger, 1985
