= Connie Christie =

English-born Australian artist

- Born: Constance Mary Charlotte Christie; 31 January 1908; Kidderminster, Worcestershire, England
- Died: 3 June 1989 (aged 81); Brighton, Victoria, Australia

Connie Christie (31 January 1908 – 3 June 1989) was an English-born Australian artist who wrote and illustrated books for children. By 1950 sales of her books were reported to have reached one million or two million copies.

== Career ==
Christie worked as a commercial artist, firstly for Val Morgan, the cinema advertising production company, and then for G. J. Coles Pty Ltd, then a chain store company. Working for Coles for 18 years, she designed its company logo and became known as the "Coles Orchid".

In 1939 she wrote and illustrated her first book, The Adventures of Pinkishell, claimed to be Australia's first children's book about mermaids. She wrote and illustrated The Connie Christie Annual from 1940 to 1950. Her output included about 50 books of nursery rhymes and fantasy stories.

== Works ==
- Christie, Connie (1939). The adventures of Pinkishell. Melbourne: Specialty Press.
- —— (1940–1950). The Connie Christie annual : fairy stories and verse. Australian Digest.
- —— (1950). Bunty's pixies. Melbourne: Specialty Press.
