= Ronald McCuaig =

Australian poet, journalist, literary critic, and children's writer

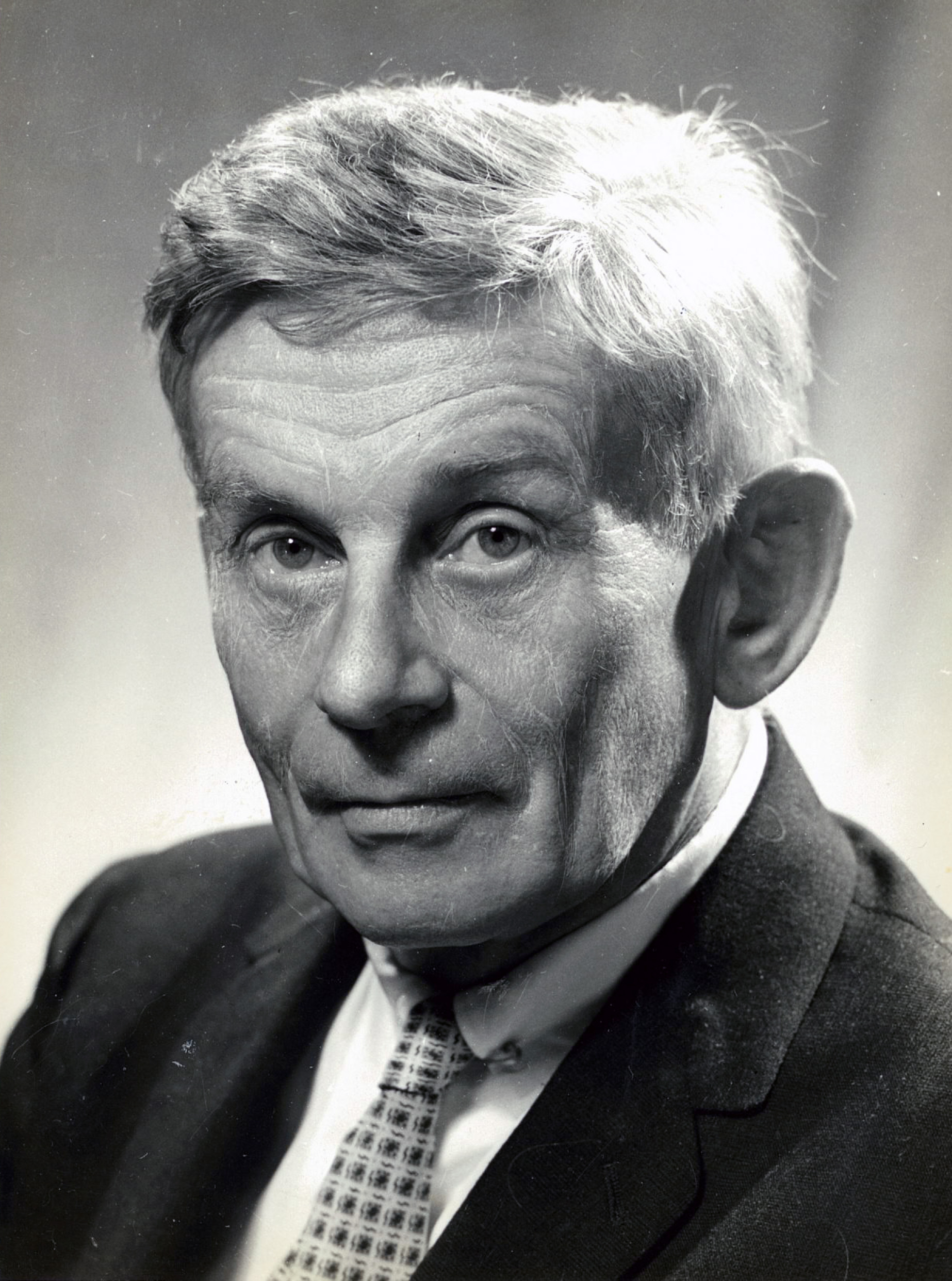
- Studio portrait of Ronald McCuaig in 1949
- Born: 2 April 1908; Newcastle, New South Wales
- Died: 1 March 1993 (aged 84); Sydney, New South Wales

Ronald McCuaig (2 April 1908 – 1 March 1993) was an Australian poet, journalist, literary critic, humorist and children's author. He was described by Geoffrey Dutton as "Australia's first modern poet" and Kenneth Slessor included him in "the front rank of Australian poets". His work was the subject of one of Douglas Stewart's 1977 Boyer Lectures for the ABC. Most of his poems were first published in The Bulletin, which he joined as a member of staff in 1949, becoming short story editor from 1950 to 1960. In Norway he is well known for his children's book Fresi Fantastika, translated into Norwegian in 1975, originally published as Gangles in English in 1972.

== Personal life ==
McCuaig's parents lived at Mayfield, on the rural fringe of Newcastle. In 1915, when McCuaig was seven BHP established an iron and steel works at the nearby suburb of Port Waratah. His mother died the same year. BHP's iron and steel works are depicted in Berceuse de Newcastle, the poem which opens McCuaig's Selected Poems (1992):

It's always sunset in the east
With a roddle-toddle-toddle,
When the night furnace is in blast
With a roddle-toddle-toddle
And all night long the rolling-mill
Goes roddle-toddle-toddle

McCuaig recalled in an interview with Peter Kirkpatrick he had taken elocution lessons in Newcastle from a woman called Beatrice Welch. At the time he would stand on the back fence and shout his poetry lessons in the direction of their neighbours.

Ronald's father worked in a warehouse as an ironmonger. After the death of his wife he brought up Ronald on his own. He was a quiet man with a love of Banjo Paterson, and passed his interests on to his son. When he was eleven Ronald spent ten days on a relative's farm remembered in ten poems which make up Holiday Farm, a sequence he wrote in 1953 and first published in book form eight years later in The Ballad of Bloodthirsty Bessie and Other Poems. On Fridays after school Ronald visited his father in his office. At the end of the working day, when the warehouse closed, father and son went to a cafe for a meal then to a show, or to the School of Arts in Hunter Street, where they sat on the upstairs veranda and took in the scene:

A cake-shop glowed across the way
With a rainbow cake display;
I never saw its keeper there,
And never saw a customer,
And yet there was activity
High in the south-western sky:
A bottle flashing on a sign
Advertising someone's wine.

McCuaig got a job at Sargood Brothers Department Store working as a "glorified office boy". One day a school friend who had gone into accountancy told him there was a place opening for somebody to write the 2BL "Topical Chorus" a nightly piece of verse on something in the news. McCuaig got the job.

== Career ==
Ronald McCuaig began writing for radio in 1927, hired by 2BL as a writer, his principal task being to write a piece of light verse for the evening program. He worked for Wireless Weekly throughout the following decade. During World War II he worked for the ABC and for Smith's Weekly. After the War he wrote for the Sydney Morning Herald.

Peter Kirkpatrick, in "Thus Quod McCuaig" (Southerly, 1991) writes that "McCuaig's earliest collection of verse, Vaudeville, was written in an astonishing two months at the end of 1933. The sexual candour of many of these poems of urban life meant they were unacceptable to the conservative literary journals and presses, so after four years of trying to find a publisher the author decided to publish them himself. Seven printers refused to touch the job, though, fearing prosecution." The book finally appeared in 1938.

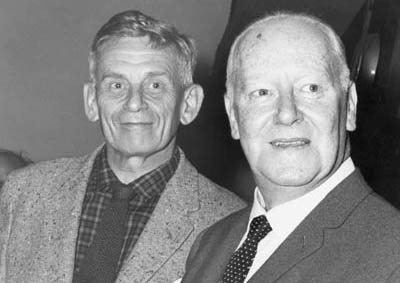
Ronald McCuaig (left) with Kenneth Slessor.

Kenneth Slessor, writing for Smith's Weekly, called Vaudeville "the most remarkable book of Australian poetry published this year." Douglas Stewart described McCuaig's work as both astonishing and outrageous. Peter Kirkpatrick described McCuaig as "one of Australia's finest lyric poets."

McCuaig's published poetry includes Vaudeville (1938), which contains his early modernist work, The Wanton Goldfish (1941), and the collections Quod Ronald McCuaig (1946), The Ballad of Bloodthirsty Bessie (1961) and Selected Poems (1992) which contained his later works previously published as Scenes from Childhood and Holiday Farm. His poems were widely anthologised. He also wrote short stories and essays – Tales Out of Bed (1944) and Australia and the Arts (1972) – as well as two children's books Gangles (1972) and Tobolino and the Amazing Football Boots (1974). Fresi fantastika (1975) was a Norwegian version of Gangles.

Some of his poems were set to music by George Dreyfus (Music in the Air). Despite the success of The Ballad of Bloodthirsty Bessie in 1961, McCuaig published no more volumes or collections until Kirkpatrick's compilation of poems spanning his entire career Selected Poems (1992) Angus & Robertson. This mainstream publication established McCuaig as a highly original and versatile poet, modernist in the observational style, and a superb technician, master of 17th century conceits and madrigals. His lighter verse was colloquial and satirical.

The poems in Vaudeville were written in a two-month period between the end of November 1933 and January 1934, written at night because McCuaig's day job was working as a journalist on The Wireless Weekly. Publishers considered the poems unacceptably explicit and even when McCuaig decided to pay for the printing himself seven printing firms refused to print the book because of the subject matter. McCuaig decided in 1938 to publish Vaudeville himself, printing the book on a hand-press in his flat at Pott's Point. Thirteen out of the total twenty poems are portraits of individual women, the others focus on either a man being in love with a woman or the dilemma he faces through involvement with a woman. Interwoven is the theme of these women's quiet lives of desperation. McCuaig's women endured rape, old age, loneliness, prostitution and adultery, themes aligned with the modernist preoccupation with isolation.

In a contemporary review of Vaudeville Adam Mckay wrote: "In an ironic and (yes) in a ribald manner, Ronald McCuaig states something of his own vision of life. Like Kenneth Mackenzie he too is a Sydney journalist whose ephemeral work has brilliant comedy and satire; but unlike Mr Mackenzie he undertakes no naked flight back to Earth; his poetry dwells in flats, rides on tram-cars goes to picture-shows, in a mixture of kisses and derision. Mr McCuaig is unconventional and indecorous, and a long way from being respectable; but I have high esteem of the value of ribaldry in literature."

McCuaig's second book of poems, The Wanton Goldfish, (1941) contained poems written earlier than those in Vaudeville, before he was influenced by Leavis, T. S. Eliot and Ezra Pound, and concentrated on poetic forms including the Elizabethan song, the triolet, and the sestina. Like Vaudeville, The Wanton Goldfish was printed on his private press. He had come to like printing his own books. The edition was of 170 copies on bond paper, 13 on hand-made paper, and another 30 on hand-made paper with three additional drawings.

Towards the end of World War II came a successful book Tales out of Bed (1944). Douglas Stewart noted sales of thousands of copies were due in part to the Americans in Australia at the time buying up just about all the books in Sydney and clamouring for more. The first story The Fairy in the Suitcase, features a fairy skipping naked out of its suitcase producing any number of bottles of beer her lucky owner cares to ask for. Also included was McCuaig's appreciation of Kenneth Slessor's poetry, the first extensive essay on Slessor ever to be published. Tales out of Bed also included essays on T. S. Eliot and the poetry of Leon Gellert. In 1949, McCuaig joined the editorial staff of The Bulletin, becoming short story editor from 1950 to 1960. As 'Swilliam' he contributed many articles of literary criticism, theatre reviews and topical verse.

In 1992 McCuaig was awarded a New South Wales Premier's Literary Awards Special Award for his contribution to Australian Literature. The award was instigated by board member Geoffrey Dutton with support from Elizabeth Riddell and Barry Humphries in an attempt to gain recognition for McCuaig.

== Modernism ==
In The innovators : the Sydney alternatives in the rise of modern art, literature and ideas, Macmillan, 1986 Geoffrey Dutton named Ronald McCuaig "Australia's First Modernist Poet". He explained what he meant by modernism and McCuiag's part in it in a 1999 interview with Susan Hill in the Animist, January 1999 where he said Kenneth Slessor was usually considered to be the first Australian modernist poet but that McCauig was slightly ahead of him. This was because Slessor was held back by the influence of Norman Lindsay who was a romanticist in an Australian group of writers and artists practising what Dutton called "fossilised 19th century diction" which had "no relation to the present day world". Dutton went on to explain T. S. Eliot had published The Waste Land in 1922 but was largely unknown or considered irrelevant in Australia in the 1920s. Slessor and McCuaig were both followers of French modernism but more so with McCuaig who was not (unlike Slessor) under the "powerful influence of Norman Lindsay".

Neither Hill nor Dutton had been able to find any Australian influence on McCuaig, who was the first to break with the rural Georgian tradition and write directly about the modern world in an observational style. Yet McCuaig was barely known as a modern poet in his lifetime. This was the result, Geoffrey Dutton and Douglas Stewart believed, of McCuaig's shyness (to the point of social anxiety) and his lack of self-promotion. He was never "taken up by anyone" Dutton said. According to Dutton, Slessor, who became well known as a modernist poet, knews and admired McCuaig, loved his expression and thought he was a marvellous technician. McCuaig himself acknowledged his influences, having read Leavis's New Bearings in English Poetry, Eliot, Henry James, and Ezra Pound which he bought as first editions.

One aspect of McCuaig's modernism noted by Hill and Dutton was the rather explicit nature of his love poems, especially in Vaudeville written in 1933, at a time when writing about women, sex, and love between men and women was virtually unknown in Australia. Even more unusual was the strong feminist response characterized by McCauig's work. Hill said the feminist perspective in The Letter, a poem about rape, was unique for the era. The Letter employs a savage, satirical tone to attack misogyny:

The opposite flat is dark and dumb,
Yet I feel certain he will come
Home to his love as drunk as ever
And, in a slowly rising fever,
Noting the whisky bottle gone,
Will trip and curse and stumble on
Into the bathroom, pull the chain,
Fumble the cabinet, curse again;
Will ask the slut where she has hid
His toothbrush; blunder back to bed,
Find his pyjamas tied in knots
And give her, as he puts it, what's
Coming to her. She won't escape
Her deeply meditated rape.

== Literary criticism ==
Ronald McCuaig produced a number of commentaries on Australian literature in the form of articles (especially for the Bulletin's Red Page), essays, and booklets, notably Literature a survey of Australian writing from 1810 to 1965. He was the first to produce an in depth review of Kenneth Slessor in The Bulletin in August 1939 and republished in "Tales out of bed" (1944) The review was favourable, ranking Slessor above C.J. Brennan and W.B. Yeats. It was written a year before "Five Bells" which marked Slessor's move to modernism, a move inspired, according to Rundle and others, by McCuaig. The review therefore covers the pre-modernist parts of Slessor's poetry.

In 1954 McCuaig was the editor of an anthology Australian Poetry published by Angus and Robertson greeted upon its arrival by William T. Fleming in Meanjin as "frankly depressing". Fleming finds, in comparison with overseas anthologies, the collection guilty of unimaginative use of rhyme, crude prosody, heavy-handed abstraction and fashionable obscurity. He finds the ballads entirely without poetic merit and blames The Bulletin (where McCuaig worked) for their inclusion. Helen Heney on the other hand in her Southerly review of Australian Poetry 1954 doesn't find the need to compare Australian poetry with overseas models and admires the wry, dry, slightly harsh Australian aroma. She rates most highly Judith Wright's "Request to a Year" while finding some other offerings including the poem "Tower View, Maitland", "unprecise and mentally formless".

In contrast to his rather savage treatment by some in the academic poetry establishment McCuaig was a rather even-handed and positive critic, not easily displeased and only occasionally disappointed. In his review of Australian Poetry, 1951-1952 selected by Kenneth Mackenzie (Angus and Robertson, 1952) he takes pleasure in the efforts of Rosemary Dobson, David Campbell, Hal Porter, Elizabeth Riddell, Douglas Stewart, Vivian Smith, Peter Hopeghood and Nancy Keesing; is ambivalent about Ray Mathew and Roland Robinson; and is only mildly critical of Rex Ingamells and Ian Mudie.

== Critical reception ==
Despite recognition by his peers around the time of Vaudeville and later by Geoffrey Dutton, Kenneth Slessor, Douglas Stewart and Peter Kirkpatrick McCuaig's reputation in Australian literature has been mixed.

When the collection QUOD Ronald McCuaig appeared in 1946 his Vaudeville era modernism was viewed as "satisfying poetry" but perhaps trivial by R T Dunlop in Southerly.

Academic establishment critics were sometimes scathing. New Zealand born A. D. Moody, while senior lecturer at the University of Melbourne 1958-1964 in his 1961 Poetry Chronicle included McCuaig among the "anti-poetry versifiers who seem bent, whether out of ignorance or indifference or contempt, upon debasing their medium". He singled out McCuaig in particular in saying his "tone and attitudes are fairly consistently man-to-man-over-the-beer-keg".

In 2010 essayist Guy Rundle remarked McCuaig's greatest contribution to Australian poetry "may well be that he encouraged his friend and fellow journalist-poet Kenneth Slessor to a more ambitious aesthetic, thus helping him to bust out of his late Georgianism and into the full modernity of 'Five Bells". Rundle's assessment was that McCuaig could hit a "cool and stylish note in his verse, although much of it dips too far into the twee and whimsical for contemporary tastes".

Laurence Bourke in Southerly (1992) rates McCuaig's body of work as represented by Selected Poems (1992) more highly than Rundle (who was anyway using him more as an example of creative drive unassisted by the state or the status quo and not critiquing him as such). Bourke echoes Geoffrey Dutton's call for McCuaig's repatriation as an important literary figure but disputes the label "modernist". He argued to call Vaudeville "modernist" distorts "either the literary term or the poems". He prefers the term "modern", a term he notes Dutton used. Burke also considers the ballads and songs of childhood written from 1953 to 1959 the highlight of the collection, and argues these are "not modernist in any useful sense of the term."

Elkin in Poems from Literature and from Life, in Southerly, reviewing The Ballad of Bloodthirsty Bessie, and Other Poems takes the complete opposite view to Moody, arguing it is in the boisterous tales and ballads McCuaig is fully himself, especially "Mokie's Madrigal", and "The Ballad of Bloodthirsty Bessie" which he regards as "altogether delightful — fantastic but not strained, consistent, full of life, and quite un-literary ... the rollicking tale of a country virgin who kills her lovers — sailors lured inland to work on the farm by Bessie's shrewd old father — in order to save them from the sin of sexual indulgence."

Alan Gould in his contemporary 1992 review of McCaug's Selected Poems (1992) dismisses the light verse, praises a lightness of touch in The Wanton Goldfish and judges McCuaig's best work to be not his modernist poems of sexual candour but his poems of charmed innocence in works such as Au Tombeau de Mon Pere.

Gary Catalano in Rude life and immaculate art is another who considers the group of autobiographical poems about his childhood in Newcastle (containing Au Tombeau de Mon Pere) grouped together under the title of Scenes from Childhood in both The Ballad of Bloodthirsty Bessie and other Poems and Selected Poems, are McCuaig's major achievement, and Au Tombeau de Mon Pere his best poem.

== Bibliography ==
=== Poetry books ===
- Vaudeville, Ronald McCuaig, Potts Point, Sydney 1938
- The Wanton Goldfish, Ronald McCuaig with drawings by Vic. Cowdroy, 1941
- Quod, Ronald McCuaig, Angus and Robertson, 1946
- The Ballad of Bloodthirsty Bessie, Ronald McCuaig, Angus and Robertson, 1961
- Selected Poems, Ronald McCuaig, Angus & Robertson, 1992, 124 pages. A collection which draws on poems from McCuaig's previously published Scenes from Childhood, Holiday Farm, Quod Ronald McCuaig, Vaudeville and Assorted Light Verse.

=== Prose ===
- Tales out of bed, Ronald McCuaig, Allied Authors and Artists, 1944

=== Children's books ===
- Gangles, Ronald McCuaig, 1972 Angus and Robertson ISBN 9780207124365
- Tobolino and the amazing football boots, 1974 Ronald McCuaig, illustrated by Lee Whitmore ISBN 0207128863

=== Other ===
- Poetry readings by Ronald McCuaig recorded by Hazel de Berg for the Hazel de Berg collection, McCuaig reads two of his poems: Passionate clerk to his love and Country dance.
- Literature a Reference Paper (published by the Australian News and Information Bureau, 1965)
- Writing Poetry: The Why and the How, Ronald McCuaig 1948 Broadcast on ABC Radio between November 1947 and February 1948 Appeared in: Southerly vol. 9 no. 4 1948 pg. 208-213

=== Selected list of poems ===
Title	Year	First published	Reprinted/collected in
"The Commercial Traveller's Wife"	1958	The Penguin Book of Australian Verse edited by John Thompson, Kenneth Slessor and R. G. Howarth, Penguin, 1958	The Ballad of Bloodthirsty Bessie and Other Poems, Angus and Robertson, 1961, pp. 136-137
