= Kenneth Slessor =

Australian poet and journalist

Kenneth Slessor OBE
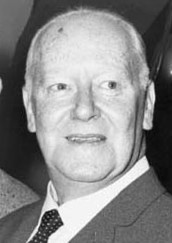
- Kenneth Slessor on 3 January 1949
- Born: 27 March 1901; Orange, New South Wales, Australia
- Died: 30 June 1971 (aged 70); North Sydney, New South Wales, Australia
- Education: Mowbray House School; Sydney Church of England Grammar School
- Occupations: Poet, journalist
- Spouses: Noëla Glasson (m. 1922; dec'd. 1945); Pauline Wallace (m. 1951; dis. 1961)
- Children: Paul Slessor
- Writing career
- Years active: 1924–1970

Kenneth Adolphe Slessor OBE (27 March 1901 – 30 June 1971) was an Australian poet, journalist and official war correspondent in World War II. He was one of Australia's leading poets, notable particularly for the absorption of modernist influences into Australian poetry. The Kenneth Slessor Prize for Poetry is named after him.

== Early life ==
Slessor was born Kenneth Adolphe Schloesser in Orange, New South Wales. As a boy, he lived in England with his parents until 1903, when the family moved to Sydney. In Australia he visited the mines of rural New South Wales with his father, a Jewish mining engineer whose father and grandfather had been distinguished musicians in Germany.

His family moved to Sydney in 1903. Slessor attended Mowbray House School (1910–1914) and the Sydney Church of England Grammar School (1915–1918), where he began to write poetry. His first published poem, "Goin'", about a wounded digger in Europe, remembering Sydney and its icons, appeared in The Bulletin in 1917. Slessor passed the 1918 NSW Leaving Certificate with first-class honours in English and joined the Sydney Sun as a journalist. In 1919, seven of his poems were published. He married for the first time in 1922.

== Career ==
Slessor made his living as a newspaper journalist, mostly for The Sun, and was a war correspondent during World War II (1939–1945). In that capacity, he reported not only from Australia but from Greece, Syria, Libya, Egypt, and New Guinea.

Slessor also wrote on rugby league football for the popular publication Smith's Weekly. He was also a film critic and wrote a treatment for a movie on Charles Kingsford-Smith that was not used.

The bulk of Slessor's poetic work was produced before the end of World War II. His poem "Five Bells"—relating to Sydney Harbour, time, the past, memory, and the death of the artist, friend and colleague of Slessor at Smith's Weekly, Joe Lynch—remains probably his best known poem, followed by "Beach Burial", a tribute to Australian troops who fought in World War II.

In 1965, Australian writer Hal Porter wrote of having met and stayed with Slessor in the 1930s. He described Slessor as:

...a city lover, fastidious and excessively courteous, in those qualities resembles Baudelaire, as he does in being incapable of sentimentalizing over vegetation, in finding in nature something cruel, something bordering on effrontery. He prefers chiselled stone to the disorganization of grass.

Ronald McCuaig was the first to produce an in-depth review of Kenneth Slessor (in The Bulletin in August 1939 and republished in "Tales out of bed" (1944)). The review was favourable, ranking Slessor above C.J. Brennan and W.B. Yeats. It was written a year before "Five Bells", which marked Slessor's move to modernism, a move inspired, according to Rundle and others, by McCuaig. The review therefore covers the pre-modernist parts of Slessor's poetry.

According to poet Douglas Stewart, Kenneth Slessor's poem "Five Visions of Captain Cook" is equally as important as "Five Bells" and was the 'most dramatic break-through' in Australian poetry of the twentieth century.

In 1944 he published his definitive volume of poetry, One Hundred Poems, and from that point on Slessor published only three short poems. Instead of writing poetry, after 1944, and for the rest of his life, Slessor chose to concentrate on journalism and supporting literary projects whose aim was to help develop Australian poetry.

Slessor was a member of The Journalists' Club Sydney and served as its Vice-President 1940–1957, then as its President 1957–1965. A portrait of Slessor was painted by fellow Journalists' Club member William Pidgeon, who painted the portraits of practically every club president up to 1976.

== Awards ==
In the 1959 New Year Honours, Slessor was appointed an Officer of the Order of the British Empire (OBE) for services to literature.

== Personal life ==
Slessor counted Norman Lindsay, Hugh McCrae and Jack Lindsay among his friends.

At the age of 21, Slessor married 28-year-old Noëla Beatrice Myer Ewart Glasson (born 25 December 1893) in Ashfield, Sydney, on 18 August 1922. Noëla was the daughter of Australian soprano and music composer Annie May Colette Summerbelle (1867–1949) and Herbert Edward Glasson (1867–1893). She never knew her father who was executed at the Bathurst Gaol on 29 November 1893, a month before her birth, after he was found guilty of a double—almost quadruple—murder of 24 September 1893. Noëla died of cancer on 22 October 1945.

He married Pauline Wallace in 1951; and a year later celebrated the birth of his only child, Paul Slessor, before the marriage dissolved in 1961.

He died suddenly of a heart attack on 30 June 1971 at the Mater Misericordiae Hospital, North Sydney. His ashes are interred in Rookwood Cemetery.

== Bibliography ==
=== Journals ===
Vision: A Literary Quarterly, edited by Frank C. Johnson, Jack Lindsay & Kenneth Slessor:

- Vision: A Literary Quarterly, No. 1 (May 1923), Sydney: The Vision Press.
- Vision: A Literary Quarterly, No. 2 (August 1923), Sydney: The Vision Press.
- Vision: A Literary Quarterly, No. 3 (November 1923), Sydney: The Vision Press.
- Vision: A Literary Quarterly, No. 4 (February 1924), Sydney: The Vision Press.

=== Poetry collections ===
- Thief of the Moon, Sydney: Hand press of J. T. Kirtley (1924); limited edition of 150 copies
- Earth-visitors: Poems, London: Fanfrolico Press (1926); limited edition of 425 numbered copies
- Trio: A Book of Poems, with Harley Matthews and Colin Simpson, Sydney: Sunnybrook Press (1931); limited edition of 75 copies
- Darlinghurst Nights and Morning Glories: Being 47 Strange Sights Observed from Eleventh Storeys, in a Land of Cream Puffs and Crime, by a Flat-Roof Professor: and here set forth in Sketch and Rhyme, with illustrations by Virgil Reilly, Sydney: Frank C. Johnson (1931)
- Cuckooz Contrey, Sydney: Frank C. Johnson (1932); limited edition of 500 copies
- Funny Farmyard: Nursery Rhymes and Painting Book, with drawings by Sydney Miller, Sydney: Frank Johnson (1933).
- Five Bells : XX Poems, Sydney: Frank C. Johnson (1939)
- One Hundred Poems, 1919–1939, Sydney: Angus & Robertson (1944); revised edition published as Poems, 1957; new edition published as Selected Poems, 1978

=== Essays/prose ===
- Bread and Wine, Sydney, Angus & Robertson (1970).

=== Edited ===
- Australian Poetry (1945)
- Robert Guy Howarth; Kenneth Slessor; John Thompson, eds. (1961). The Penguin Book of Modern Australian Verse. Melbourne: Penguin.

=== Selected list of poems ===
| Title | Year | First published | Reprinted/collected in |
|---|---|---|---|
| "Earth-Visitors (to N. L.)" | 1926 | | Earth-Visitors : Poems, Fanfrolico Press, 1926, pp. 30-31 |
| "The Night-Ride" | 1926 | | Earth-Visitors : Poems, Fanfrolico Press, 1926, p. 58 |
| "Five Visions of Captain Cook" | 1931 | | Trio: A Book of Poems by Kenneth Slessor, Harley Matthews and Colin Simpson, Sunnybrook Press, 1931, pp. 1-26 |
| "Captain Dobbin" | 1932 | | Cuckooz Contrey, Frank Johnson, 1932, pp. 19-23 |
| "Country Towns" | 1932 | | Cuckooz Contrey, Frank Johnson, 1932, p. 56 |
| "Elegy in a Botanic Gardens" | 1932 | | Cuckooz Contrey, Frank Johnson, 1932, p. 44 |
| "Five Bells" | 1939 | | Five Bells : XX Poems, Frank Johnson, 1939, pp. 15-20 |
| "North Country" | 1939 | | Five Bells : XX Poems, Frank Johnson, 1939, pp. 30-31 |
| "South Country" | 1939 | | Five Bells : XX Poems, Frank Johnson, 1939, p. 32 |
| "Beach Burial" | 1944 | Southerly vol. 5 no. 3, 1944, p. 13 | Poems, Angus and Robertson, 1975, p. 127 |

== Recognition ==
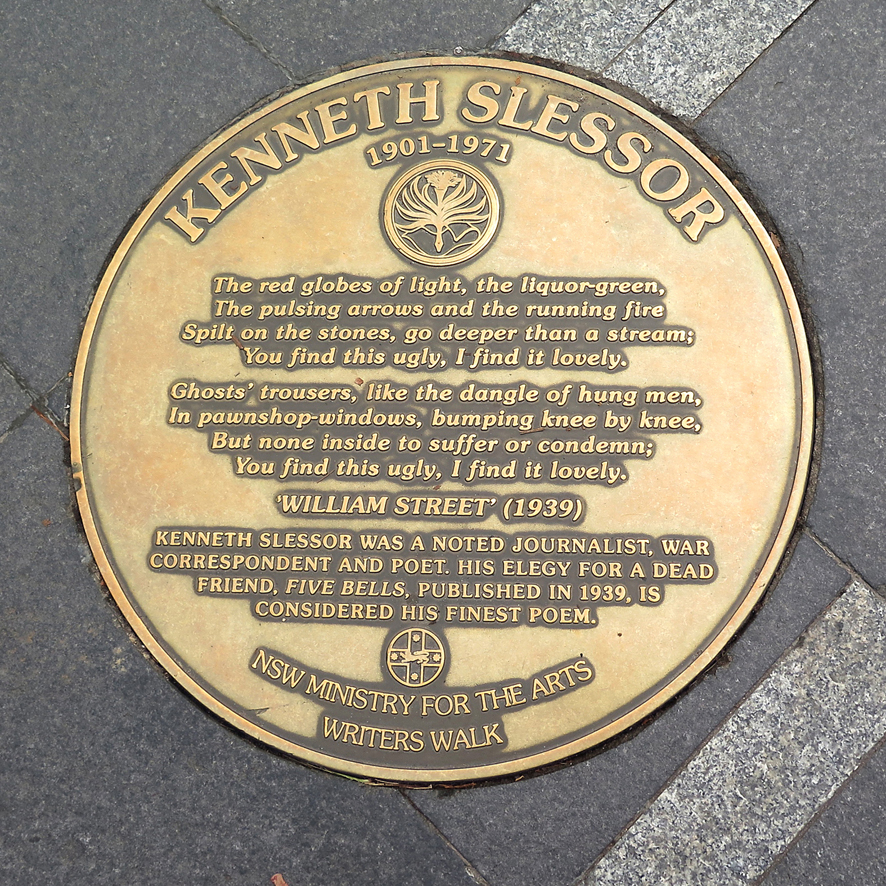
Plaque, Sydney Writers Walk

- Slessor has a street in the Canberra suburb of McKellar named after him.
- Kenneth Slessor Park in Chatswood in named in his honour; the park features architecture with his poem, "Five Bells".
- The 1988 musical Darlinghurst Nights is based on his poetry and he is featured as a character.
- The bells motif in "Five Bells" is referenced at the end of the 1999 song "You Gotta Love This City" by The Whitlams, which also involves a drowning death in Sydney Harbour.
- Slessor's poetry was chosen to be placed on the Higher School Certificate English reading lists, and was also examined in the final English exam.
- Kenneth Slessor has a plaque dedicated to him on the Sydney Writers Walk at Circular Quay.
- The poem "For Kenneth Slessor" was written by Slessor's close friend Douglas Stewart soon after his death in 1971
- The poem "To Kenneth Slessor" by Peter Skrzynecki is about his relationship with the poet. This poem was featured in the poetry anthology Old/New World.
- The poem "Time" by David McIlwain explores Slessor's poetry in terms of his life around Sydney Harbour
