= 1885 in literature =

This article contains information about the literary events and publications of 1885.

You don't know about me without you have read a book by the name of 'The Adventures of Tom Sawyer'; but that ain't no matter. That book was made by a Mr Mark Twain, and he told the truth, mainly.

—Opening lines of Adventures of Huckleberry Finn

== Events ==
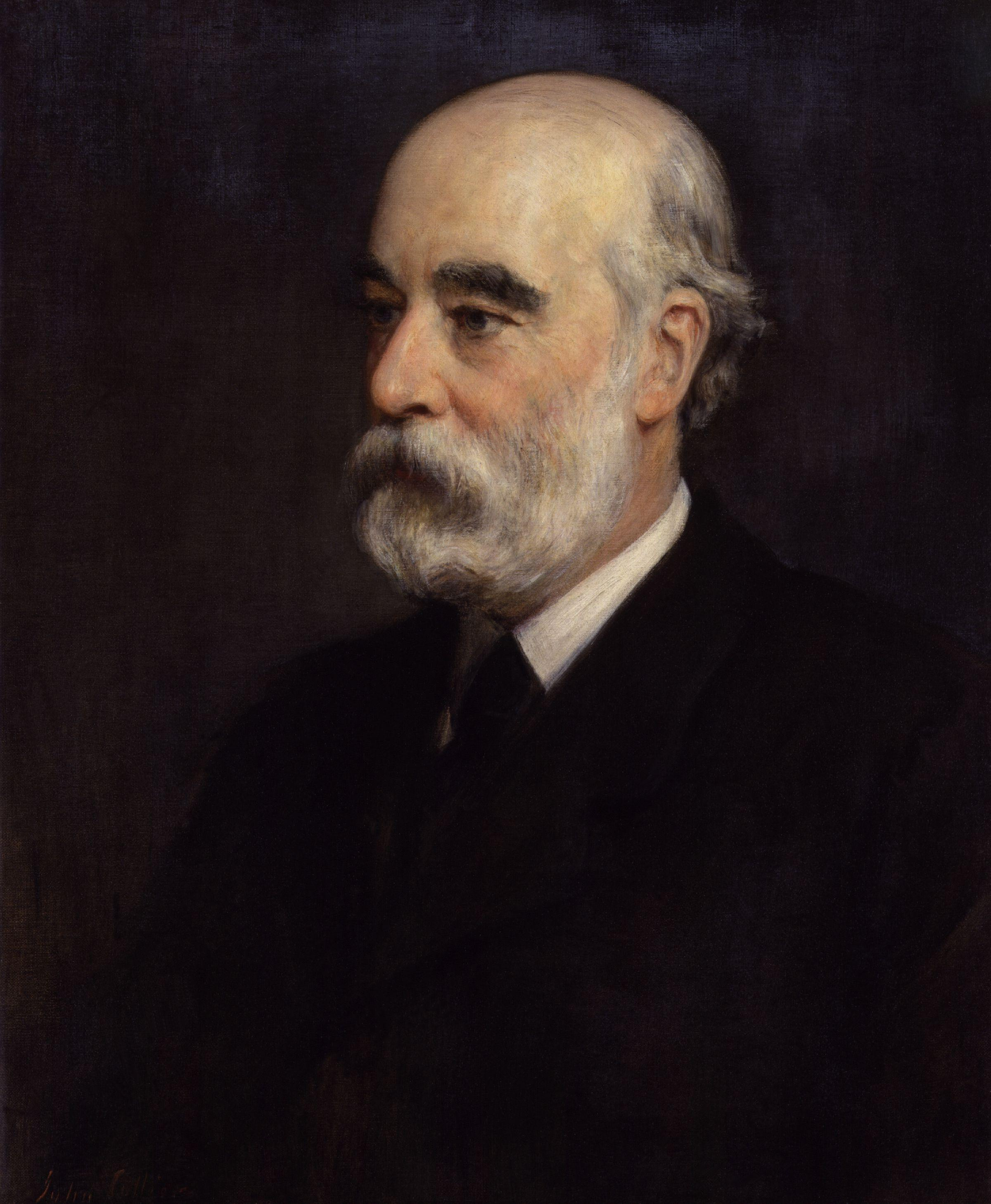
George Murray Smith conceived of the Dictionary of National Biography, subsidized it, and saw it finally into print before he died in 1901.

- January 1 – The Dictionary of National Biography begins publication in London under the editorship of Leslie Stephen.
- January 9 – Stage premiere of Henrik Ibsen's tragicomedy The Wild Duck (Vildanden), at Den Nationale Scene, Bergen in Norway.
- February 18 – Mark Twain's Adventures of Huckleberry Finn is published in the United States for the first time, in New York by the author's own publishing house, Charles L. Webster, illustrated by E. W. Kemble, the first impression having been delayed for replacement of an unauthorized obscene alteration to one of the illustrative plates. Its first-person narrative in colloquial language is initially controversial but ultimately influential in the development of realism in American literature.
- March 7 – José Echegaray's play La vida alegre y muerte triste opens in Spain.
- March 19 – Bolesław Prus's first major naturalistic novel, The Outpost (Placówka), begins serialization in the Polish illustrated weekly, Wędrowiec.
- May – Henri Beauclair and Gabriel Vicaire, using the pseudonym Adoré Floupette, publish Les Déliquescences d'Adoré Floupette, a parodic collection of poems satirising French symbolism and the Decadent movement.
- May 16 – Sakuradoki Zeni no Yononaka ("The Season of Cherry Blossoms; The World of Money"), an adaptation by Genzo Katsu after Bunkai Udagawa of The Merchant of Venice set in the Edo period, is performed by the Nakamura Sojuro Kabuki company at the Ebisu-za Theater in Osaka, the first of Shakespeare's plays to be staged with actors in Japan.
- May 19 – The Revised Version Old Testament is published.
- June 1 – More than two million people join Victor Hugo's funeral procession in Paris from the Arc de Triomphe to the Panthéon, where he is the first author to be buried, following his death on May 22 in the city from pneumonia aged 83.
- June 29 – Thomas Hardy moves to a house he designed for himself and built by his brother at Max Gate on the outskirts of Dorchester, Dorset.
- December 6 – Frederick James Furnivall founds the Shelley Society.
- unknown dates
  - Arthur Napier is appointed first Merton Professor of English Language and Literature in the University of Oxford.
  - John Ormsby's English translation of Miguel de Cervantes's Don Quixote is published. For many years it is regarded as the most accurate translation of the novel.
  - The first translation of Leo Tolstoy's War and Peace into English begins publication. It has been done by Clara Bell from a French version.
  - The first translation of Amy Catherine Walton (Mrs. O. F. Walton)'s Christian novel Christie's Old Organ into Japanese, made by Tajima Kashi, is published, one of the earliest examples of children's literature in Japan.
  - Daniel Owen's long novel Hunangofiant Rhys Lewis, Gweinidog Bethel is published as the first written in Welsh.

== New books ==
=== Fiction ===
- Leopoldo Alas (Clarín) – La regenta, vol. 2
- Mathilde Blind – Tanantella: A Romance
- Richard Francis Burton – The Book of the Thousand Nights and a Night: A Plain and Literal Translation of the Arabian Nights Entertainments
- Hall Caine
  - She's All the World to Me
  - The Shadow of a Crime
- Mrs. W. K. Clifford – Mrs. Keith's Crime
- Antonio Fogazzaro – Daniele Cortis
- Oliver Wendell Holmes Sr. – A Mortal Antipathy
- William Dean Howells – The Rise of Silas Lapham
- Richard Jefferies – After London
- Jerome K. Jerome – On the Stage — and Off
- Sarah Orne Jewett – A Marsh Island
- Henry Francis Keenan – The Money Makers (Published anonymously.)
- Eliza Lynn Linton – The Autobiography of Christopher Kirkland
- Guy de Maupassant – Bel-Ami
- George Meredith – Diana of the Crossways
- Friedrich Nietzsche – Thus Spoke Zarathustra (publication concluded)
- Daniel Owen – Hunangofiant Rhys Lewis, Gweinidog Bethel
- Walter Pater – Marius the Epicurean
- Tsubouchi Shōyō (坪内 逍遥) – Tōsei Shosei Katagi (Portraits of Contemporary Students)
- Jules Vallés – Jacques Vingtras
- Jules Verne – Mathias Sandorf
- John Strange Winter (Elizabeth Stannard) – Booties' Baby: a story of the Scarlet Lancers
- Émile Zola – Germinal

=== Children and young people ===
- Lewis Carroll – A Tangled Tale
- H. Rider Haggard – King Solomon's Mines
- Robert Louis Stevenson
  - A Child's Garden of Verses (originally Penny Whistles)
  - Prince Otto
- Mark Twain – Adventures of Huckleberry Finn (U.S. publication)

=== Drama ===
- Bjørnstjerne Bjørnson – Geografi og Kærlighed
- Arthur Wing Pinero – The Magistrate

=== Poetry ===
- See 1885 in poetry

=== Non-fiction ===
- J. W. Cross (ed.) – George Eliot's Life, as related in her letters and journals
- Anténor Firmin – De l'Égalité des Races Humaines (On the Equality of Human Races)
- Tsubouchi Shōyō ((坪内 逍遥) – Shōsetsu Shinzui (The Essence of the Novel)

== Births ==
- January 16 – Zhou Zuoren (周作人), Chinese vernacular writer (died 1967)
- February 7 – Sinclair Lewis, American novelist (died 1951)
- February 21 – Sacha Guitry, French dramatist and screenwriter (died 1957)
- February 24 – Stanisław Ignacy Witkiewicz, Polish painter, playwright and novelist (died 1939)
- March 6 – Ring Lardner, American writer (died 1933)
- March 25 – Mateiu Caragiale, Romanian novelist and poet (died 1936)
- March 27 – Constantin Gane, Romanian biographer and historical novelist (died 1962)
- April 17 – Karen Blixen, Danish author (died 1962)
- May 2 – Hedda Hopper, American columnist (died 1966)
- May 8 – Thomas B. Costain, Canadian author and journalist (died 1965)
- May 9 – Al. T. Stamatiad, Romanian poet (died 1955)
- July 10 – Mary O'Hara, American author and screenwriter (died 1980)
- July 18 – Marino Moretti, Italian poet and author (died 1979)
- August 15 – Edna Ferber, American novelist, short story writer, and playwright (died 1968)
- September 7 – Elinor Wylie (Elinor Morton Hoyt), American poet and novelist (died 1928)
- September 11 – D. H. Lawrence, English fiction writer and poet (died 1930)
- September 24 – Shane Leslie, Irish author (died 1971)
- October 3 – Sophie Treadwell, American dramatist and journalist (died 1970)
- October 11 – François Mauriac, French novelist (died 1970)
- October 30 – Ezra Pound, American poet (died 1972)
- November 9 (October 28 O.S.) – Velimir Khlebnikov, Russian Futurist poet and writer (died 1922)
- December 8 – Kenneth Roberts, American novelist (died 1957)

== Deaths ==
- January 10 – Amable Tastu, French women of letters and poet (born 1795)
- February 14 – Jules Vallés, French writer (born 1832)
- March 17 – Susan Warner (pseudonym Elizabeth Weatherell), American religious and children's writer (born 1819)
- April 8 – Susanna Moodie, English-born Canadian author (born 1803)
- April 18 – Marc Monnier, French author and translator (born 1827)
- April 30 – Jens Peter Jacobsen, Danish novelist (born 1847)
- May 13 – Juliana Horatia Ewing, English children's writer (born 1841)
- May 15 – Hugh Conway, English novelist (born 1847)
- May 22 – Victor Hugo, French poet and novelist (born 1802)
- June 18 – Louis Segond, Swiss theologian (born 1810)
- July 13 – Augusto Vera, Italian philosopher (born 1813)
- July 15 – Rosalía de Castro, Spanish Galician poet and writer (born 1837)
- August 11 – Richard Monckton Milnes, 1st Baron Houghton, English man of letters, poet and politician (born 1809)
- September 18 – John Campbell Shairp, Scottish critic (born 1819)
- November 29 – Anne Gilchrist, English-born American critic and biographer (emphysema, born 1828)
