= 1885 in poetry =

This article covers 1885 in poetry. Nationality words link to articles with information on the nation's poetry or literature (for instance, Irish or France).

== Events ==
- Frederick James Furnivall founds the Shelley Society
- Henri Beauclair and Gabriel Vicaire, using the pseudonym Adoré Floupette, publish Les Déliquescences d'Adoré Floupette, a parodic collection of poems satirising French symbolism and the Decadent movement.

== Works published in English ==
=== Canada ===
- Frederick George Scott, Justin and Other Poems. Published at author's expense.

=== United Kingdom ===
- Maude Ashurst Biggs, Master Thaddeus, first English translation of Adam Mickiewicz, Pan Tadeusz (1834)
- Robert Bridges, Eros and Psyche
- Charles Stuart Calverley (died 1884), Literary Remains
- Jean Ingelow, Poems: Third Series (see also Poems 1863, Poems 1880)
- William Morris, Chants for Socialists
- Robert Louis Stevenson, A Child's Garden of Verses
- Algernon Charles Swinburne, Marino Faliero
- Edwin Arnold, The Song Celestial
- Alfred Lord Tennyson, Tiresias, and Other Poems, including "Balin and Balan", one of the Idylls of the King 1870; "The Last Tournament" 1871; Gareth and Lynette 1872, Idylls of the King 1889
- Katharine Tynan, Louise de la Valliere, and Other Poems

=== United States ===
- Charles Follen Adams, Mother's Doughnuts
- Thomas Bailey Aldrich, Poems
- Will Carleton, City Ballads
- William Ellery Channing, Eliot
- Ada Langworthy Collier, "Lilith, The Legend of the First Woman"
- Paul Hamilton Hayne, The Broken Battalions
- Oliver Wendell Holmes:
  - Ralph Waldo Emerson, nonfiction
  - Illustrated Poems
- Eva Munson Smith, Woman in Sacred Song

=== Other in English ===
- Toru Dutt, Ancient Ballads and Legends of Hindustan Indian writing in English

== Works published in other languages ==
- Catulle Mendès, Soirs moroses, Contes épiques, Philoméla, etc; Poésies, in seven volumes; France

== Births ==
Death years link to the corresponding "[year] in poetry" article:

- January 6 – Humbert Wolfe (died 1940), English poet, writer and civil servant
- January 20 – Ozaki Hōsai 尾崎 放哉 pen name of Ozaki Hideo (died 1926), Japanese, late Meiji period and Taishō period poet
- January 25 – Hakushū Kitahara 北原 白秋, pen-name of Kitahara Ryūkichi 北原 隆吉 (died 1942), Japanese, Taishō and Shōwa period tanka poet
- April 21 – Mitsuko Shiga 四賀光子, pen-name of Mitsu Ota (died 1956), Japanese, Taishō and Shōwa period tanka poet, a woman
- April 26 – Dakotsu Iida 飯田 蛇笏, commonly referred to as "Dakotsu", pen names of Takeji Iida 飯田 武治 (died 1962), Japanese, haiku poet; trained under Takahama Kyoshi
- April 29 – Andrew Young (died 1971), Scottish-born poet and clergyman
- May 12 – Saneatsu Mushanokōji 武者小路 実篤 實篤, sometimes known as "Mushakōji Saneatsu"; other pen-names included "Musha" and "Futo-o" (died 1976), Japanese, late Taishō period and Shōwa period novelist, playwright, poet, artist and philosopher
- May 13 – Hideo Nagata 長田秀雄 (died 1949), Japanese, Shōwa period poet, playwright and screenwriter
- July 1 – Dorothea Mackellar (died 1968), Australian poet and fiction writer
- July 8 – Veikko Antero Koskenniemi (died 1962), Finnish poet
- July 20 – Herman Wildenvey, born Portaas (died 1959), Norwegian poet
- August 18 – Nettie Palmer (died 1964), Australian poet, essayist and Australia's leading literary critic; wife of Vance Palmer
- August 24 – Bokusui Wakayama, 若山 牧水 (died 1928), Japanese "Naturalist" tanka poet
- August 28 – Vance Palmer, (died 1959), Australian novelist, dramatist, essayist and critic; husband of Nettie Palmer
- September 3 – Ghulam AhmadMahjur (died 1952), Indian, Kashmiri-language poet
- September 11 – D. H. Lawrence (died 1930), English fiction writer, poet, playwright, essayist and literary critic
- October 30 – Ezra Pound (died 1972), American poet and editor
- November 9 (October 28 O.S.) – Velimir Khlebnikov (died 1922), Russian Futurist poet and writer
- November 28 – Gladys Cromwell (suicide 1919), American poet
- December 19 – F. S. Flint (died 1960), English poet, translator and prominent member of the Imagist group
- Also
  - Govindagraj, also known as "Ram Ganes" Gadkari (died 1919), Indian, Marathi-language poet, playwright and humorist
  - Ivan Zorman (died 1957), Slovene-born poet and composer

== Deaths ==
Birth years link to the corresponding "[year] in poetry" article:

- January 10 – Amable Tastu (born 1795), French women of letters and poet
- May 22 – Victor Hugo (born 1802), French novelist and poet
- April 8 – Susanna Moodie (born 1803), Canadian poet
- April 30 – Jens Peter Jacobsen (born 1847), Danish novelist and poet
- May 29 – Alfred Meissner (born 1821?), Austrian poet
- July 15 – Rosalía de Castro (born 1837), Spanish Galician poet and writer
- August 11 – Richard Monckton Milnes, 1st Baron Houghton (born 1809), English man of letters, poet and politician
- August 12 – Helen Hunt Jackson (born 1830), American writer, novelist and poet
- September 24 – George Frederick Cameron (born 1854 in poetry), Canadian poet and journalist

== See also ==
- 19th century in poetry
- 19th century in literature
- List of years in poetry
- List of years in literature
- Victorian literature
- French literature of the 19th century
- Symbolist poetry
- Poetry
