= Eleanor C. Price =

- Born: 1847; Bishop's Cleeve
- Died: 31 May 1933
- Occupations: Novelist, literary critic, biographer

Eleanor Catharine Price (1847 – 31 May 1933) was a British novelist.

Eleanor Catharine Price was born in 1847 in Bishop's Cleeve, the daughter of Thomas Edward Price. She contributed to a number of periodicals as a book reviewer and author, including The Spectator, The Monthly Packet, the Manchester Guardian, and London Society She published numerous works: almost two dozen novels, including contemporary romances and historical fiction, biographies, and works for children. Her story "A Coachful of Ghosts" from the London Society 1877 Christmas Annual was anthologized several times in the 19th century; Everett Bleiler dismissed it as "run-of-the-mill commercial fiction."

== Bibliography ==
- One Only. 2 vol. London: Sampson Low, 1874.
- Constantia: A Novel. 2 vol. London: Sampson Low, 1876.
- A Lost Battle. 2 vol. Edinburgh: David Douglas, 1878.
- A French Heiress in Her Own Château. 1 vol. London: Sampson Low, 1878.
- Mrs. Lancaster's Rival. 3 vol. London: Sampson Low, 1879.
- The Story of a Demoiselle. (Blue-Bell Series) 1 vol. London: Marcus Ward, 1880.
- Valentina: A Sketch. 2 vol. London: Chatto and Windus, 1882.
- The Foreigners: A Novel. 3 vol. London: Chatto and Windus, 1883.
- Miss Monkton's Marriage. London: Society Novelettes, 1883.
- High Aims: or, Studies from the Annals of Christian Endeavour. London: Nisbet & co., 1884.
- Gerald. 3 vol. London: Chatto and Windus, 1885.
- Alexia. 1 vol. London: Bentley, 1886.
- Red Towers. 3 vol. London: Bentley, 1889.
- A Loyal Mind. 1 vol. London: Remington, 1889.
- May in Anjou: With Other Sketches and Studies. Edinburgh: D. Douglas, 1889.
- The Little One. 2 vol. London: Bentley, 1891.
- Miss Latimer of Bryans. 3 vol. London: Bentley, 1893.
- In the Lion's Mouth: The Story of Two English Children in France, 1789-1793. 1 vol. London: Macmillan, 1894.
- John's Lily. 1 vol. London: Wells, Gardner, Darton, 1894.
- Poor Little Mother. 1 vol. London: S. P. C. K., 1896.
- Young Denys: A Story of the Days of Napoleon. 1 vol. Edinburgh: W. & R. Chambers, 1896.
- Off the High Road: The Story of a Summer. 1 vol. London: Macmillan, 1899.
- Two Half-Sovereigns: A Christmas Story. 1 vol. London: S. P. C. K., 1899.
- Brown Robin. 1 vol. London: William Isbister, 1899.
- The Heiress of the Forest: A Romance of Old Anjou. 1 vol. London: William Isbister, 1900.
- Tina the Wanderer. 1 vol. London: S. P. C. K., 1901.
- Angelot: A Story of the First Empire. London: George G. Harrap, 1902.
- In Slippery Places. Oxford: A. R. Mowbray & Co., 1905.
- The Queen's Man: A Romance of the War of the Roses. London: Archibald Constable & Co., 1905.
- A Princess of the Old World [Anne Marie Louise d'Orléans, Duchess of Montpensier]. London: Methuen & Co., 1907.
- Cardinal de Richelieu. London: Methuen & Co., 1912.
- Stories from French History. London: G. G. Harrap & Co., 1921.
- Alix of the Château: A Romance of the Days of Louis XIII. London: G. G. Harrap & Co., 1924.
- Stories from English History. London: G. G. Harrap & Co., 1924.
- The Adventures of King Arthur. 1931.
- Merry Dance: An Old-Fashioned Story. London: Sheldon Press, 1931.
