= Anna L. Cunningham =

Anna L. Cunningham may refer to:

- Pen name for Ada Langworthy Collier
- Pen name for Ruth Crowley and then Eppie Lederer
