= Mathesis =

Mathesis may refer to

- 454 Mathesis, an asteroid discovered in 1900
- Mathesis (journal), a Belgian mathematics journal founded in 1881
- Mathesis (philosophy), the science of establishing a systematic order for things according to Michel Foucault
- Mathesis (society), an Italian association of mathematics teachers
- Mathesis universalis, a hypothetical universal science advocated by Leibniz and Descartes among others
- Mathesis universalis, a treatise on integral calculus published by John Wallis in 1657
- Mathesis Universalis (journal), a philosophy journal published by the University of Białystok in Poland
- Matheseos Libri Oct., commonly referred to as Mathesis, a book on astrology by fourth-century author Julius Firmicus Maternus
- Mathesis biceps, vetus et nova, a treatise published by Juan Caramuel y Lobkowitz in 1670
- Mad Mathesis, fictional characters in The Dunciad by Alexander Pope and A Tangled Tale by Lewis Carroll
- Mathesis Publications, the publisher of Ancient Philosophy (journal)
