= Ferdinand Cohen-Blind =

Failed assassin of Otto von Bismarck

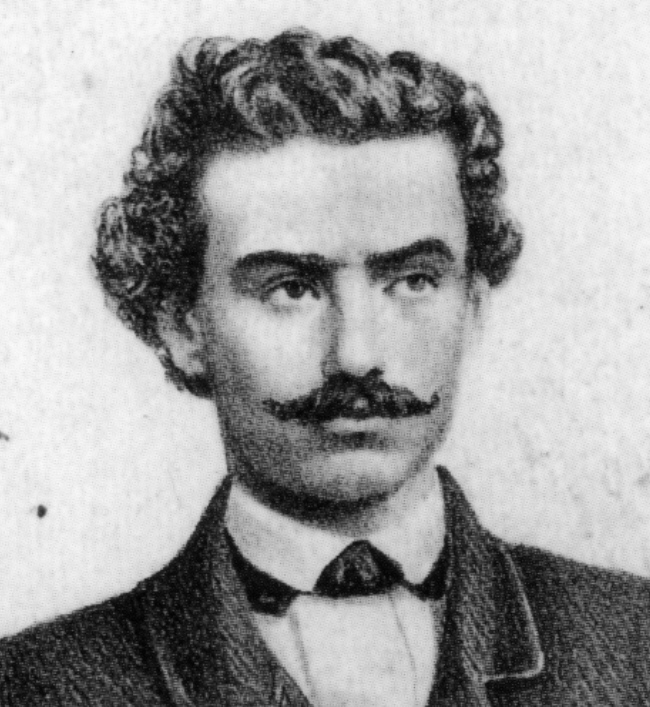
Ferdinand Cohen-Blind

Ferdinand Cohen-Blind (March 25, 1844 – May 8, 1866) was a Jewish German student who attempted to assassinate Otto von Bismarck, the Minister President of Prussia. Cohen-Blind committed suicide shortly after his arrest.

== Childhood and youth ==
Cohen-Blind was born in Mannheim, Grand Duchy of Baden to Jacob Abraham Cohen and his second wife Friederike, née Ettlinger. He was the younger brother of Mathilde Blind (1841-1896), who became a well-known poet.

Shortly after her son's birth, Friederike began a relationship with journalist and revolutionary Karl Blind, a former student of the University of Heidelberg who had been expelled for expressing radical democratic sentiments. She financially supported Blind's political activities and was arrested with him in the summer of 1847. They married after Jacob Cohen's death in 1848, at which time Ferdinand's last name was changed to Cohen-Blind.

After the Baden Revolution Blind and his family went into exile, stopping in Paris and Brussels before arriving in London in 1852. A childhood in exile shaped Ferdinand; following in his parents' shoes, he rejected the monarchical system of the German states, hoping to emulate his stepfather as a champion of democracy.

Cohen-Blind returned to Germany in his 18th year, studying at the University of Tübingen and (from 1864) the Agricultural Academy of Hohenheim, where he was known as a good student.

== Assassination attempt ==
After graduating in March 1866, Cohen-Blind went on a hike through Bavaria and Bohemia. The growing likelihood of war between Prussia and Austria led him to the decision to attempt to kill Bismarck, whom he saw as the originator of the threat of civil war. In a 1866 letter to his friend Mathilde Weber, Blind is quoted as saying:

As I wandered through the blooming fields of Germany, that were so soon to be crushed under the iron heel of war, and saw the numbers of youths pass by that were to lose their lives for the selfish aims of a few, the thought came quite spontaneously to punish the cause of so much evil, even if it were at the cost of my life.

He left Carlsbad, arriving in Berlin and checking into the Hotel Royal Unter den Linden hotel on May 5. On the afternoon of May 7, he lay in wait for Bismarck, revolver in hand, in the Unter den Linden, a boulevard in central Berlin. The Chancellor had just reported to King Wilhelm and was now walking home. When Bismarck was close to the Russian Embassy, Cohen-Blind took aim and fired twice from behind; Bismarck spun around and grabbed his attacker, who was able to fire three more shots before soldiers from the 1st Battalion of the 2nd Guards rushed up and took him into custody. The newspaper Neue Aschaffenburger Zeitung reported that a soldier near Bismarck was shot in the crossfire. Bismarck continued on his way home. Later that night, he allowed the King's physician, Gustav von Lauer, to examine him. Lauer noted that the first three bullets had only grazed Bismarck's body and the last two had ricocheted off the ribs and had caused no major injuries.

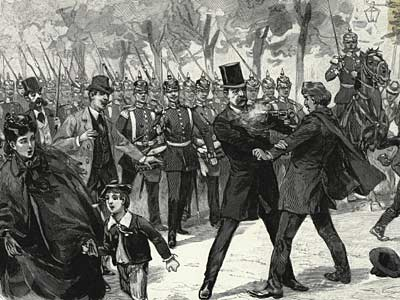
Cohen-Blind shoots Bismarck

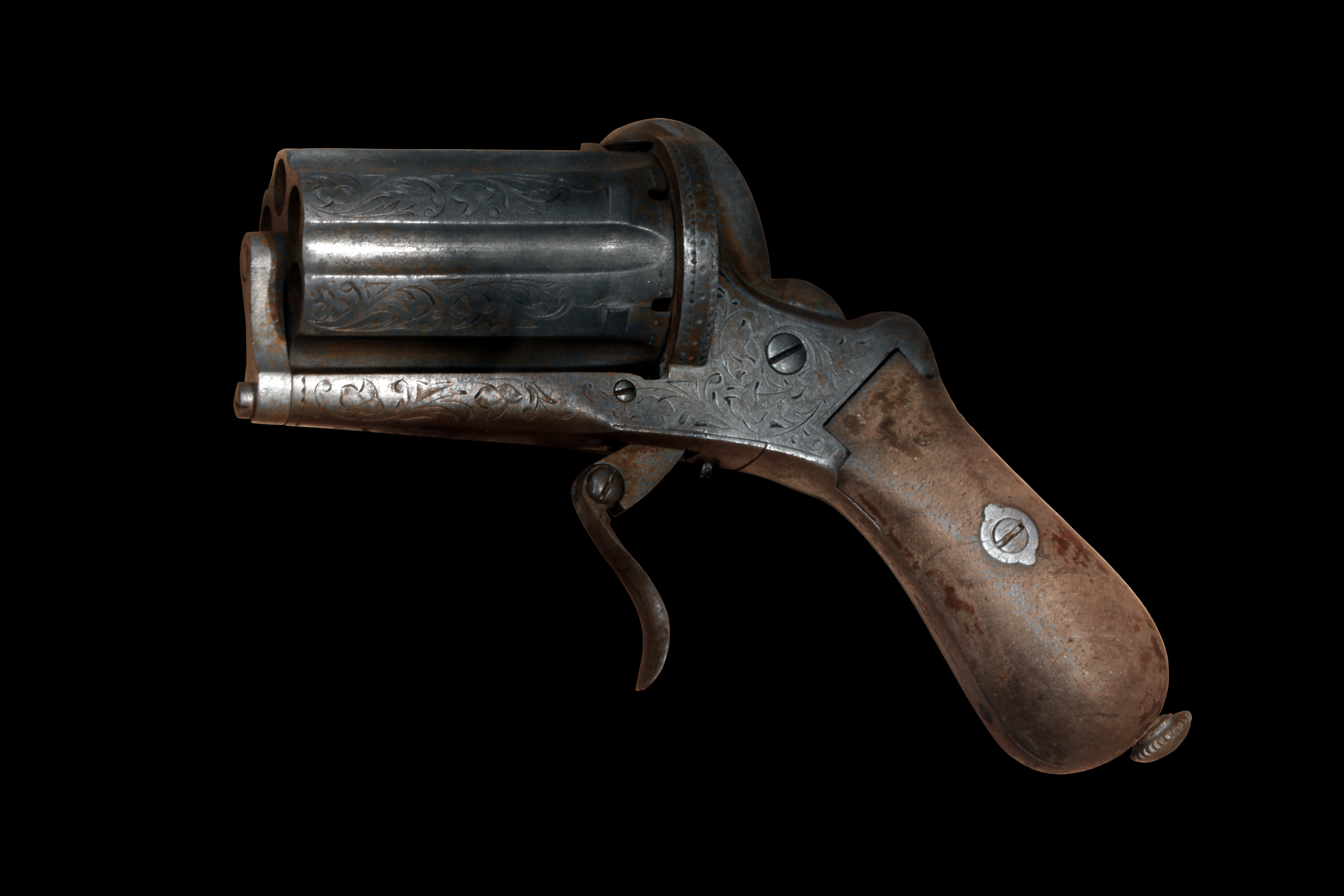
Cohen-Blind's pistol

Cohen-Blind was taken to police headquarters for questioning, but in an unguarded moment, he slashed his own throat with a pocket knife, severing his carotid artery. He died shortly after 4 a.m. on May 8. His body was quickly buried at night without ceremony in St. Nicholas Cemetery.

Bismarck immediately tried to tie Blind's assassination attempt to some sort of larger conspiracy and started surveilling classmates of Blind's. On the day of the shooting Bismarck wrote a letter to the Russian tsar Alexander II of Russia saying it was part of a plot by "South German Revolutionaries". Wilhelm Stieber told Bismarck there was a conspiracy headed by Karl Blind, so he dispatched two agents to London to spy on the German community there. Police Captain Greiff, one of the agents sent to spy on Blind, told Bismarck that there was no evidence Karl was involved, and that the Blind family was "horrified by the young Blind's actions, and even today the mother remains seriously ill as a result of the news.".

Cohen-Blind's weapon, a 6-shot Lefaucheux Pepperbox-Revolver, is on display in the Bismarck-Museum (de) in Friedrichsruh.

== Sources ==
- Julius H. Schoeps: Bismarck und sein Attentäter. Der Revolveranschlag Unter den Linden am 7. Mai 1866. Ullstein Verlag, 1984, ISBN 3-550-07963-X
- Ladislas Farago and Andrew Sinclair: "Royal Web: The Story of Princess Victoria and Frederick of Prussia". Mcgraw-Hill, 1982, ISBN 0070199418
