= Jason R. Rudy =

Jason R. Rudy is Professor of English at the University of Maryland, College Park. A noted scholar of Victorian poetry, Rudy is the author of the ambitious and widely reviewed Electric Meters: Victorian Physiological Poetics (Ohio University Press 2009). His second monograph, Imagined Homelands: British Poetry in the Colonies, was published by the Johns Hopkins University Press in 2017. He has been the recipient of a 2010-11 National Endowment for the Humanities Research Fellowship (2010–11) and a 2014 research fellowship from the American Council of Learned Societies. Rudy received his Ph.D. in English from Rutgers University and his B.A. from Princeton University.

He is the first cousin of professional wrestler Trent Barreta.

== Selected publications ==
"Settled: Dorrit Down Under." Nineteenth-Century Literature 72.1 (September 2020), 184-206.

"Floating Worlds: Émigré Poetry and British Culture." ELH (Spring 2014), 325-50.

Victorian Cosmopolitanisms (special issue). Edited and introduced with Tanya Agathocleous, Hunter College Victorian Literature and Culture (Fall 2010)

“Hemans' Passion.” Studies in Romanticism 45 (Winter 2006), 543-62.

“Rapturous Forms: Mathilde Blind's Darwinian Poetics.” Victorian Literature and Culture 34, (Fall 2006), 443-59

Spasmodic Poetry and Poetics (special issue). Edited and introduced with Charles LaPorte, U of Washington Victorian Poetry 42 (Winter 2004)

“Rhythmic Intimacy, Spasmodic Epistemology.” Victorian Poetry 42, Winter 2004 (Special issue: Spasmodic Poetry and Poetics ), 451-72 <3

“On Cultural Neoformalism, Spasmodic Poetry, and the Victorian Ballad.” Victorian Poetry 41, Winter 2003 (Special issue: Whither Victorian Poetry? ed. Linda K. Hughes), 590-96
