= Rosa Nouchette Carey =

English novelist (1840–1909)

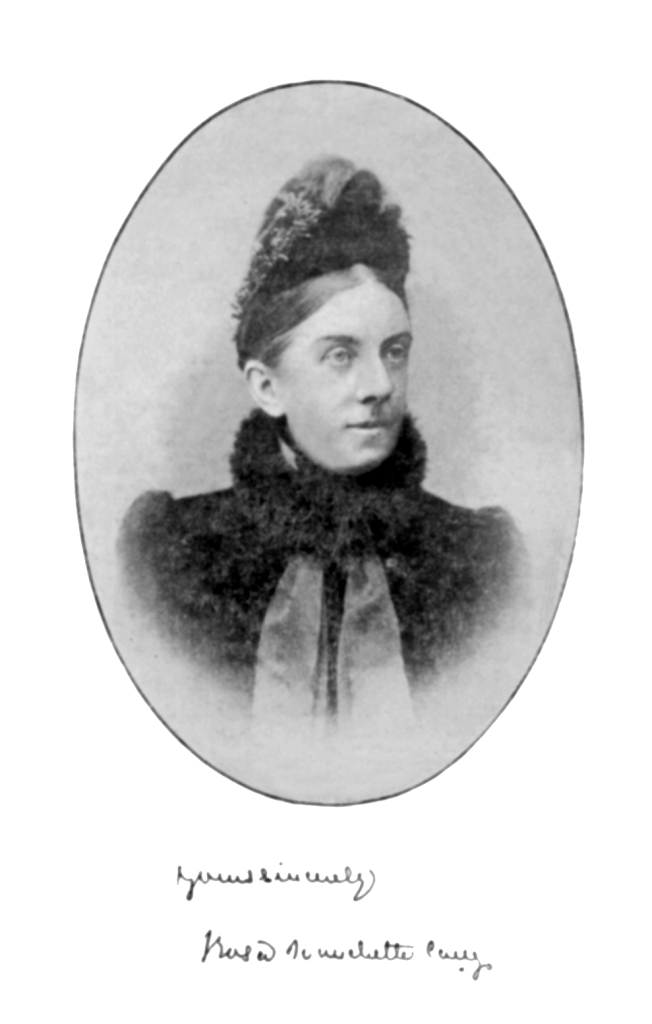
- Born: Rosa Nouchette Carey; 27 September 1840; Stratford-le-Bow, Middlesex, England
- Died: 9 July 1909 (aged 68); Putney, London, England
- Occupations: novelist and children's writer

Rosa Nouchette Carey (27 September 1840 – 9 July 1909) was an English popular novelist, magazine journalist and children's writer, whose works reflect the Christian values of her time and were thought of as wholesome. However, they are "not entirely bereft of grit and realism."

== Life ==
Born in Stratford-le-Bow, Rosa was the sixth of the seven children of William Henry Carey (died 1867), shipbroker, and his wife, Maria Jane (died 1870), daughter of Edward J. Wooddill. She was brought up in London at Tryons Road, Hackney, Middlesex and in South Hampstead. She was educated at home and at the Ladies' Institute, St John's Wood, where she was a contemporary and friend of the German-born poet Mathilde Blind (1841–1896). Her first novel, Nellie's Memories (1868), arose out of stories she had told to her younger sister.

As her writing career expanded after the death of her parents, so did her family responsibilities. When her mother died in 1870, she and an unmarried sister went to keep house for a widowed brother and look after his children. Later, the sister married and the brother died, leaving Carey in sole charge of the children. Among her close friends was the prolific novelist Mrs Henry Wood. The poet Helen Marion Burnside came to live with her in about 1875, and Carey's sister returned to keep house for them after her husband died. Carey died of lung cancer at her home in Putney, London, on 19 July 1909 and was buried in Hampstead Cemetery.

== Writings ==
Nellie's Memories appears to have sold over 50,000 copies. Most of her 33 three-decker novels told pious, domestic stories, thought of as wholesome fiction in the last third of the 19th century. Often sentimental, they reflect the values of the period, "treating housekeeping and woman's caring role as real work." However, her 1869 novel Wee Wifie features vitriol-throwing, opium addiction, and hereditary insanity. Also notable are Carey's sympathetic portrayals of women suffering from mental illness. Several novels suggest mental health can be ensured by "control of the will", as advocated by the psychiatrist Henry Maudsley. One of her books, Heriot's Choice (1879), was serialised in Charlotte M. Yonge's magazine The Monthly Packet and another, Mistress of Brae Farm (1896), in Argosy. She was a less intellectual and humorous writer than Yonge, but placed her characters shrewdly in the populous urban, book-buying middle class.

Of one of her last novels, the Royal Cornwall Gazette wrote in 1908, "In spite of the fact, or because of it, that the plot of Rosa Carey's new book, The Sunny Side of the Hill, is purely domestic, it lacks none of the attraction that distinguishes her numerous efforts. The narrative, full of intimate touches of domestic life, is so well woven, and told in such an easy and natural style, that it inspires great interest, and contains hardly one uninteresting page. ... Miss Carey's work is always artistic, and "The Sunny Side of the Hill” is no exception. Her people live and move and seem so much alive that the reader is carried from one situation to another in the easiest and most natural style".

Carey was on the staff of the Girl's Own Paper, for which she wrote eight serials. She also wrote a laudatory biographical collection of Twelve Notable Good Women of the XIXth Century (1899), including Queen Victoria and the Quaker philanthropist and reformer Elizabeth Fry.

The London publisher Macmillan had 18 novels by Carey on their Three-and-Sixpenny Library list in 1902. Some of her books were reprinted by the Religious Tract Society in the 1920s.

There have been doubts about whether Carey was the author of four thrillers published under the pseudonym Le Voleur in the 1890s.

=== Published works ===
Carey was a prolific author; the list of her works on the British Library catalogue reflects a publishing rate of at least a book a year.

- Nellie's Memories: a domestic story (London: Tinsley Bros., 1868)
- Wee Wifie: a tale (London, 1869)
- Wooed and Married: a novel (London: Tinsley Bros., 1875)
- Heriot's Choice: a tale (London: R. Bentley & Son, 1879)
- Queenie's Whim: a novel (London: R. Bentley & Son, 1881)
- Not like Other Girls: a novel (London: R. Bentley & Son, 1884)
- Robert Ord's Atonement: a novel (London: R. Bentley & Son, 1884)
- For Lilias: a novel (London: R. Bentley & Son, 1885)
- Uncle Max (London: R. Bentley & Son, 1887)
- Esther (London: The Religious Tract Society, 1887)
- Only the Governess (London: R. Bentley & Son, 1888)
- Aunt Diana (London: The Religious Tract Society, 1888)
- The Search for Basil Lyndhurst (London: R. Bentley & Son, 1889. Reissued as Basil Lyndhurst, 1895)
- Merle's Crusade (London: The Religious Tract Society, 1889)
- Lover or Friend? (London: R. Bentley & Son, 1890)
- Our Bessie (London: The Religious Tract Society, 1891)
- Averil (London: The Religious Tract Society, 1891)
- Sir Godfrey's Grand-daughters: a novel (London: R. Bentley & Son, 1892)
- But Men Must Work (London: R. Bentley & Son, 1892)
- Mrs. Romney: a novel (London: R. Bentley & Son, 1894)
- Little Miss Muffet (London: The Religious Tract Society, 1894)
- Tiney's Birthday Gift (1894)
- By Order of the Brotherhood: a story of Russian intrigue (as Le Voleur. London: Jarrold, 1895)
- My Little Boy Blue (Fleming H. Revell Company) 1895
- The Mistress of Brae Farm: a novel (London: R. Bentley & Son, 1896)
- Other People's Lives: tales (London: Hodder & Stoughton, 1897)
- The Old, Old Story: a novel (London: R. Bentley & Son, 1897)
- Doctor Luttrell's First Patient (London: Hutchinson & Co., 1897)
- For the Love of a Bedouin Maid (as Le Voleur, London: Hutchinson & Co., 1897)
- Mollie's Prince: a novel (London: Hutchinson & Co., 1898)
- Barbara Heathcote's Trial: a novel (London, 1898)
- Cousin Mona (London: The Religious Tract Society, 1897)
- Twelve Notable Good Women of the XIXth Century (London: Hutchinson, 1899)
- Marquise: a complete story (1899)
- My Lady Frivol (London: Hutchinson & Co., 1899)
- In the Tsar's Dominions (as Le Voleur, London, 1899)
- Rue with a Difference (London: Macmillan & Co., 1900)
- Life's Trivial Round (London: Hutchinson & Co., 1900)
- The Clumpington Mystery (as Le Voleur, London, 1900)
- Herb of Grace (London: Macmillan & Co., 1901)
- The Highway of Fate (London: Macmillan & Co., 1902)
- Mary St. John: a novel (London: Macmillan & Co., 1903)
- Effie's Little Mother (London: R. Tuck & Sons, 1903)
- A Passage Perilous (London: Hodder & Stoughton, 1903)
- At the Moorings (London: Macmillan & Co., 1904)
- The Household of Peter (London: Macmillan & Co., 1905)
- Esther Cameron's Story: a tale of life and influence (London: The Religious Tract Society, 1906[?])
- No Friend Like a Sister (London: Macmillan & Co., 1906)
- The Angel of Forgiveness (London: Macmillan & Co., 1907)
- The Sunny Side of the Hill (London: Macmillan & Co., 1908)
- The Key of the Unknown (London: Macmillan & Co., 1909)

== External links and written sources ==
- Works by Rosa Nouchette Carey at Project Gutenberg
- Works by or about Rosa Nouchette Carey at the Internet Archive
- Works by Rosa Nouchette Carey at LibriVox (public domain audiobooks)
- Website biography: Retrieved 31 May 2011. Also bibliography: Retrieved 31 May 2011.
- The New York Times notice of Rosa Nouchette Carey's death: Retrieved 31 May 2012.
- Black, Helen C.: Notable Women Authors of the Day: Biographical Sketches (Glasgow: Davie Bryce & Sons, 1893)
- Crisp, Jane: Rosa Nouchette Carey (1840–1909). A Bibliography Victorian Fiction Research Guides 16 (St Lucia, Queensland: University of Queensland, 1989)
- Hartnell, Elaine: Gender, Religion and Domesticity in the Novels of Rosa Nouchette Carey (Aldershot: Ashgate, 2000). ISBN 0-7546-0283-4
- Shattock, J.: The Oxford Guide to British Women Writers (Oxford: OUP, 1993). ISBN 0-19-214176-7
- American Publishers' Trade Bindings: Rosa Nouchette Carey
