= Prince Otto =

1885 novel by Robert Louis Stevenson

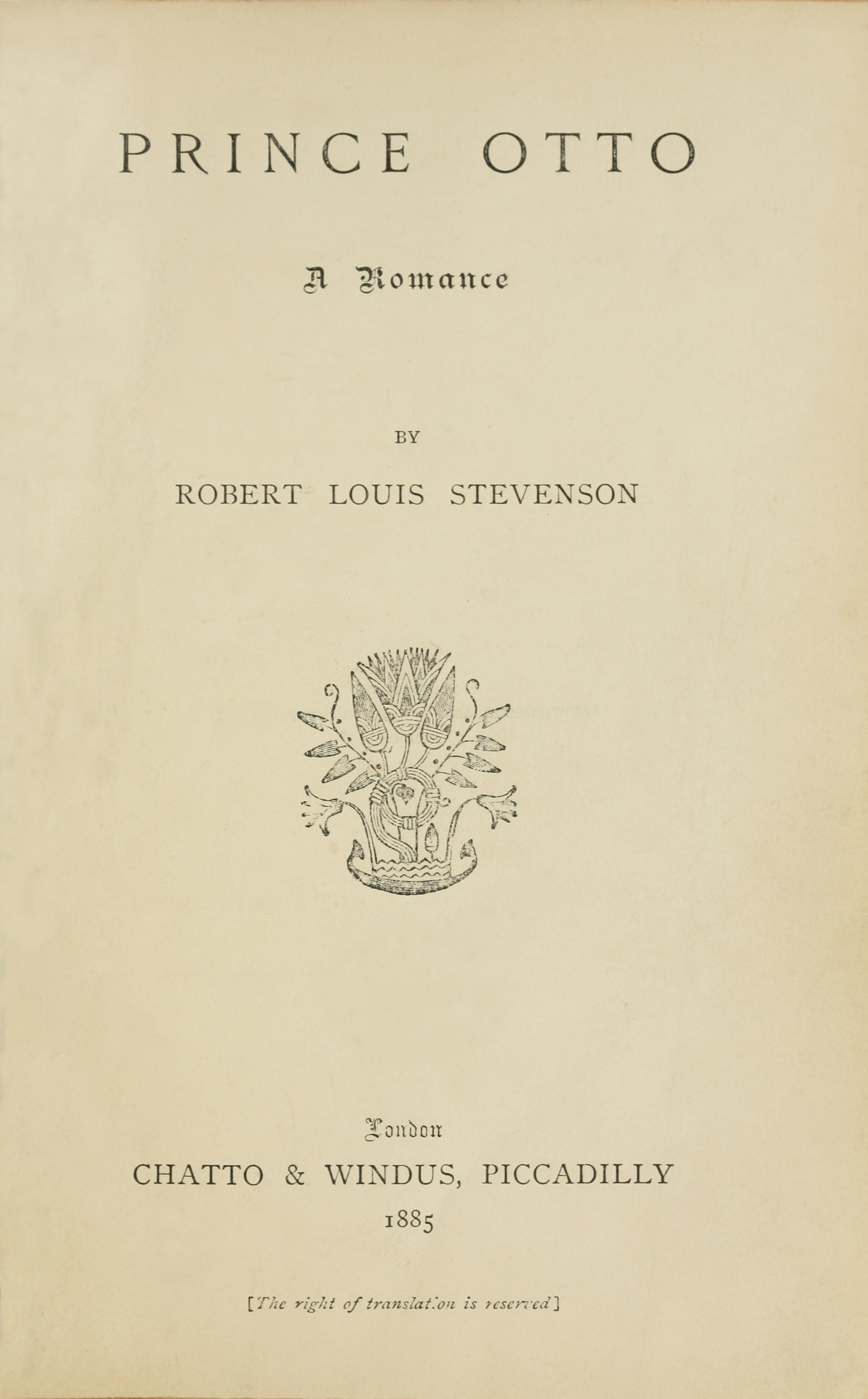
- Title page of first edition
- Author: Robert Louis Stevenson
- Language: English
- Genre: Novel
- Publisher: Chatto and Windus
- Publication date: 1 November 1885
- Publication place: Scotland
- Media type: Print (Hardback)
- Pages: 288
- Text: Prince Otto at Wikisource

Prince Otto: A Romance is a novel written by Robert Louis Stevenson, first published in 1885.

The novel was largely written during 1883. Stevenson referred to Prince Otto as "my hardest effort". One of its chapters was rewritten eight times by Stevenson and once by his wife.

== Plot ==
Prince Otto evades his escort near the borders of Grünewald (a tiny country within present-day Germany) while out hunting and enters the neighboring country of Gerolstein. There, he takes shelter for the night under an assumed disguise with Killian Gottesheim, his daughter Ottilia, and her suitor Fritz. While discussing the state of affairs, the revolutionary Fritz expresses dissatisfaction with Otto's rule as does Killian, though with more respect and restraint on the latter's part. It is revealed that Baron Gondremark has both wooed the Princess Seraphina and begun preparations for a revolt in hopes of expanding Grünewald's borders. The next morning, Ottilia defends the Prince as an honorable man and after further discussion, while still concealing his true identity, he offers to purchase Killian's farm to ensure his family's management and they agree to meet in Mittwalden, the capital of Grünewald, in two days.

Once Otto returns to his castle, he confers with his cousin Doctor Gotthold about his faults of character. They are interrupted by Chancellor Greisengesang, who bears a letter written by a Sir John Crabtree, an English visitor to the court, detailing Seraphina's indiscretions with Gondremark as well as his own affair with Countess Anna von Rosen, as well as his plans for the country. Deciding to confront Seraphina, Otto meets with Countess von Rosen in the princess's antechamber while she and Baron Gondremark agree to go forward as planned in their political scheme, but have not yet become involved physically. Otto, upon meeting her, commands Seraphina to limit her interactions with Gondremark as they smack of an affair, which she vehemently refuses to obey, stung by his accusation.

The Princess summons a council early, spurred on by Gondremark, with the intention of declaring war on Gerolstein, but Gotthold refuses to make his own voice heard with the prince absent; Prince Otto arrives unexpectedly at this moment and adamantly refuses to go to a war unprovoked and dishonourably, despite Baron Gondremark's explanations that it would be advantageous. Seraphina angrily rebukes him for never having bothered with being a ruler before and interfering in a plan to bolster the wealth and confidence of Grünewald. Prince Otto, having been refused the funds to purchase Killian's farm, offers to find an alternate solution or to abdicate his throne, but not before rescinding Seraphina's authority to sign orders and documents. Gondremark then suggests a plot to lure the Prince away on a hunting venture while they orchestrate the execution of the revolt.

Otto seeks Countess von Rosen's aid in stealing the necessary funds from the treasury, which she agrees to, but privately he rebukes himself for his own dishonesty. However, the Countess offers him the funds out of her own wealth, and they share a tender moment before he completes the transaction. Having narrowly avoided a lapse in honor, Otto plans to share his good deed with Gotthold. The doctor, however, sternly rebukes Otto for having seemingly stolen treasury funds, publicly humiliating Seraphina, and for being seen in an intimate manner with the Countess. Otto refuses to disclose how he came by the funds or that his interaction with the Countess was innocent, but is deeply wounded by Gotthold's opinion of him and forgives him sadly. The Countess meets with Gondremark and intercepts the order for Otto's hunting excursion under the pretence of arranging matters but privately delivers it to the Prince; recognizing the apparent futility of action, Otto quietly acquiesces to the terms of the arrangement. The Countess then visits Princess Seraphina and reveals her affair with Gondremark, rebuking her for her ill treatment of Otto; Seraphina signs the release for Otto and holds an audience with the Baron, where she stabs him in a fit of rage when he parades his affair before her, realizing at last his untrustworthiness. After summoning Chancellor Greisengesang to conduct the wounded Baron away for treatment, she flees by night.

Unbeknownst to Seraphina, once the populace is made aware of Gondremark's injuries, a republic is declared in Grünewald. Seraphina flees through the woods intent on reconciling with Otto. Along the way, she encounters Sir John who, acting on his recent friendship with Otto despite his distaste for the Princess, conducts her most of the way by carriage to the Felsenburg, where Otto is imprisoned. Meanwhile, Otto discovers that Doctor Gotthold has also been imprisoned, and upon encouragement from Colonel Gordon, the arresting officer, both forgive each other. Unaware of the revolution, Countess von Rosen arrives with his release order and they depart together until they encounter Sir John, who informs them of Gondremark's wounds, prompting the Countess to ride away, presumably toward the capital. Otto races toward Seraphina and they both agree to put their past lives behind them, living together with a newfound love for one another. A bibliographical postscript relates that they live together in her father's court, while Grünewald is eventually absorbed into the larger state of Germany.

== Characters ==
=== Main ===
- Prince Otto Johann Friedrich: The principal protagonist and ruler of Grünewald. Upon learning from his subjects of his ineffectual ability to rule, Otto seeks to better himself and prevent his land from revolution and war, while also striving to repair his marriage to the unfaithful Princess Seraphina.
- Princess Amalina Seraphina: The discontented wife of Prince Otto who, fed up with his frivolities and carelessness, plots with Baron Gonmdremark to depose him; she later comes to distrust the baron and recall her love for Otto.
- Baron Heinrich von Gondremark: The prime minister of Grünewald, he plots to usurp Prince Otto with the pretense of uplifting the country; to this end, he manipulates Princess Seraphina's position and authority.
- Countess Anna von Rosen: A favorite of Prince Otto who carries on an affair with Gondremark while covertly aiding the Prince.

=== Minor ===
- Kuno: A guard and escort of Prince Otto.
- Killian Gottesheim: A farm-owner with whom Otto takes refuge while hunting within the borders of neighboring country Gerolstein. He relates the public's opinion of the prince's rule and Otto later agrees to purchase his farm.
- Ottilia Gottesheim: Daughter of Killian who defends Otto both before and after learning his identity.
- Fritz: A young revolutionary inclined to ally with Baron Gondremark.
- Roederer: An intellectual and admirer of Gotthold's who Otto briefly encounters.
- Doctor Gotthold Hohenstockwitz: Chief surgeon of the realm and Otto's closest confidant and cousin.
- Chancellor Greisengesang: The chancellor of Grünewald.
- Sir John Crabtree: An English visitor who observes various nations' deeds as a spy, but changes his opinion of Otto upon meeting him.
- Colonel Oberst Gordon: An officer employed by Gondremark to occupy Prince Otto during the coup d'etat.
