= Karl Blind =

German revolutionist and journalist (1826–1907)

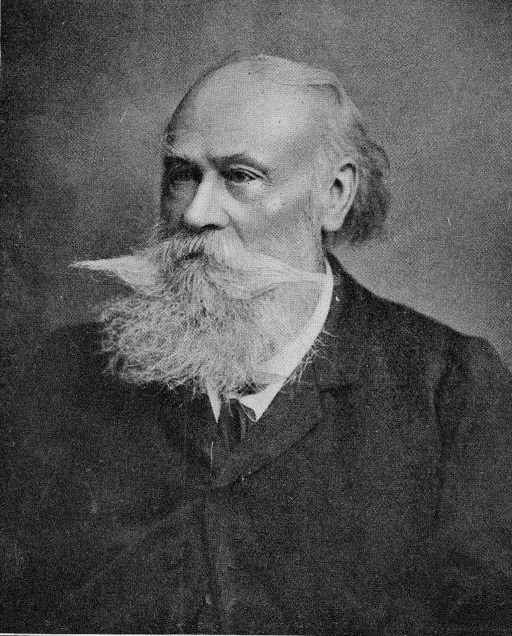

Personal details
- Born: 9 April 1826 Mannheim, Grand Duchy of Baden, German Confederation
- Died: 31 May 1907 (aged 81) London, United Kingdom
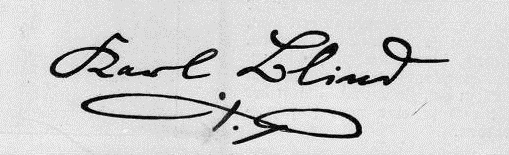
- Signature

Karl Blind (4 September 1826, Mannheim – 31 May 1907, London) was a German revolutionary and writer on politics, history, mythology and German literature. Blind participated in the Revolutions of 1848, including in the uprising in the Grand Duchy of Baden, where he was wounded. He later joined a band of liberals that invaded southern Germany before being taken prisoner. Blind was freed from prison by a revolutionary mob and eventually settled in England, where he pursued political and literary interests. In 1968, he was pardoned by the Baden government for his revolutionary actions.

== Biography ==
While a student at Heidelberg, he was imprisoned for his revolutionary activity, perhaps in consequence of a pamphlet he wrote entitled "German Hunger and German Princes." During the risings of 1848, he participated in the uprising in the Grand Duchy of Baden led by Friedrich Hecker, and had to flee, wounded. The next year, he joined the band of liberals headed by Gustav Struve which invaded southern Germany. He was taken prisoner and sentenced to eight years' confinement, but after eight months in prison, he was freed by a revolutionary mob while being taken to Mainz. He then went to Karlsruhe, whence he was sent by the provisional government of Baden as an envoy to Paris. Expelled from France, he went to Brussels, and then in 1852 found refuge in England, where he interested himself in democratic movements, and cultivated his literary as well as his political proclivities by contributing to magazines, and otherwise. He maintained an active correspondence with other democratic leaders, like Giuseppe Garibaldi, Giuseppe Mazzini, and Louis Blanc.

Many Europeans expected a unified Germany to become a European and world leader and to champion humanitarian policies. This is demonstrated in the following letter written by Garibaldi to Blind on 10 April 1865:

The progress of humanity seems to have come to a halt, and you with your superior intelligence will know why. The reason is that the world lacks a nation which possesses true leadership. Such leadership, of course, is required not to dominate other peoples, but to lead them along the path of duty, to lead them toward the brotherhood of nations where all the barriers erected by egoism will be destroyed. We need the kind of leadership which, in the true tradition of medieval chivalry, would devote itself to redressing wrongs, supporting the weak, sacrificing momentary gains and material advantage for the much finer and more satisfying achievement of relieving the suffering of our fellow men. We need a nation courageous enough to give us a lead in this direction. It would rally to its cause all those who are suffering wrong or who aspire to a better life, and all those who are now enduring foreign oppression.

This role of world leadership, left vacant as things are today, might well be occupied by the German nation. You Germans, with your grave and philosophic character, might well be the ones who could win the confidence of others and guarantee the future stability of the international community. Let us hope, then, that you can use your energy to overcome your moth-eaten thirty tyrants of the various German states. Let us hope that in the center of Europe you can then make a unified nation out of your fifty millions. All the rest of us would eagerly and joyfully follow you.

After 1866, Blind's writings became less revolutionary in tone.

Karl Blind was pardoned by the Baden government in 1867.

In 1879, a man from Ohio asked Moncure D. Conway if he could be put in touch with Blind after having dinner with Conway and his wife. Conway gave the Ohio man his card to introduce himself, and left the hotel after a few games of billiards. Two days later Blind went to talk to Conway and explains that the Ohio man asked Blind if he wanted to help kill Edward VII. Blind kicked him out of his house, however he claims that he wishes he would have called the police. Conway later received a letter from someone in Ohio claiming the man who talked to him was previously in a insane asylum.

== Personal life ==
Karl Blind married a widow, Friederike Cohen (née Ettlinger) around 1849. They had known each other for several years and been imprisoned together in 1847. They had two children together, Rudolph (born 1850, died February 1916) and Ottilie (died 1929). She already had a daughter, Mathilde, and son, Ferdinand from her first marriage.

His stepson, Ferdinand Cohen-Blind (1844–1866) attempted in May 1866 to assassinate Bismarck and then committed suicide in prison. His stepdaughter, Mathilde Blind (1841-1896), adopted his name over her father's, and became a well-known poet.

=== Daughter, Ottilie ===
After moving to Hampstead, London, Blind's family embraced the English education system and interests. Ottilie was involved in supporting women's suffrage, home rule for Ireland and the League of Nations. She organised working parties for the Serbian Red Cross during the First World War. She married a barrister Charles Hancock. She is now best known for her endowment in 1925 of the Ottilie Hancock and Hertha Ayrton Fellowships at Girton College, Cambridge.

=== Son, Rudolph ===
Rudolph was educated at University College School and the Royal Academy. He was an artist and illustrator. His best known works were The Golden Gates, Christ the Consoler, The World’s Desire (subject to two court cases, one against the artist for alleged obscenity and indecency while the other was for delivery of the picture and damages against the artist's wife), Love’s Extasy, and The Throne of Grace. He married Annie Sarah and they had 3 sons.

== Works ==
Blind published a great number of political essays and brief articles on history, mythology, and German literature. Among his works are:

- Fire-Burial Among Our German Forefathers: A Record of the Poetry and History of Teutonic Cremations.
- Yggdrasil, or, The Teutonic Tree of Existence.
- They Shall Remain Together; an Outline of the State of Things in Schleswig-Holstein, Trübner, 1861.
- Away with the House of Peers, 1872 [pamphlet, exclusively circulated in Berlin].

Additionally, he wrote biographies of Ferdinand Freiligrath, Alexandre Ledru-Rollin, and Ferenc Deák.

=== Articles ===
- "Russia and the East," Macmillan's Magazine, Vol. XX, May/October 1869.
- "The Barbarossa Legend," The Cornhill Magazine, Vol. XXI, January/June 1870.
- "Results of French Designs Upon Germany," The Fortnightly Review, Vol. XV, 1871.
- "The French Republic and the Suffrage Question," The Fortnightly Review, Vol. XVI, 1871.
- "Freia-Holda: The Teutonic Goddess of Love," The Cornhill Magazine, Vol. XXV, January/June 1872.
- "Germanic Mythology," The Contemporary Review, Vol. XXIII, December 1873/May 1874.
- "Personal Recollections about Ledru-Rollin," Fraser's Magazine, Vol. XI, New Series, January/June 1875.
- "A Forgotten Turkish Nation in Europe," The Gentleman's Magazine, Vol. CCXLI, July/December 1877.
- "Discovery of Odinic Songs in Shetland," The Nineteenth Century, Vol. V, January/June 1879.
- "Conspiracies in Russia," Part II, The Contemporary Review, Vol. XXXV, April/August 1879.
- "Conspiracies in Russia under the Reigning Czar," The Contemporary Review, Vol. XXXVI, September/December 1879.
- "Wodan, the Wild Huntsman and the Wandering Jew," The Gentleman's Magazine, Vol. CCXLIX, July/December 1880.
- "Scottish, Shetlandic, and Germanic Water-Tales," Part II, Part III, The Contemporary Review, Vol. XL, July/December 1881.
- "New Finds in Shetlandic and Welsh Folk-lore," Part II, The Gentleman's Magazine, Vol. CCLII, January/June 1882.
- "The Conflict in Germany," The Nineteenth Century, Vol. XI, January/June 1882.
- "The 'Holy Grail' a Coral Stone," The Gentleman's Magazine, Vol. CCLIV, January/June 1883.
- "Wagner's 'Siegfried' and the City of the Nibelungs," The Gentleman's Magazine, Vol. CCLIV, January/June 1883.
- "Luther in Politics," The Gentleman's Magazine, Vol. CCLV, July/December 1883.
- "Recollections of Louis Blanc," The Century Magazine, May 1887.
- "Recollections of Louis Blanc: With Notes Concerning Alsace and Lorraine," The Century Magazine, July 1887.
- "Garibaldi's Memoirs," The Contemporary Review, Vol. LIII, January/June 1888.
- "Feasibility of Aerostation," The North American Review, April 1889.
- "The German Army, with Personal Recollections – 1848 to 1889," The North American Review, August 1889.
- "Giordano Bruno and New Italy," The Nineteenth Century, Vol. XXVI, July/December 1889.
- "A Good Word for Jews," The North American Review, December 1889.
- "Luther Monuments and the German Revolution of 1525," The Scottish Review, Vol. XVI, July/October 1890.
- "Mr. Gladstone's Disestablishment of the Greek Pantheon," The Eclectic Magazine, Vol. LII, July/December 1890.
- "The National Monument for Mazzini," Murray's Magazine, Vol. IX, January/June 1891.
- "Modern Revolutions and Their Results," The North American Review, June 1892.
- "Kossuth and Klapka," The Scottish Review, Vol. XX, July/October 1892.
- "Swiss and French Election Methods," The North American Review, November 1892.
- "The Russian Approach to India," Lippincott's Monthly Magazine, Vol. LI, January/June 1893.
- "The Meaning of the Russian Name," The Scottish Review, Vol. XXII, July/October 1893.
- "An Early Aspirant to the German Imperial Crowd," The Contemporary Review, Vol. LXIV, July/December 1893.
- "Anarchy and the Napoleonic Revival," The North American Review, May 1894.
- "Ale-Drinking Old Egypt and the Thrako-Germanic Race," The Scottish Review, Vol. XXV, January/April 1895.
- "The German Wife," The North American Review, October 1895.
- "The Crisis in the East," The North American Review, January 1896.
- "After the Coronation at Moscow," The North American Review, Vol. CLXIII, 1896.
- "The Song of the 'Aegir'," The Scottish Review, Vol. XXVII, January/April 1896.
- "Problems of the Transvaal," The North American Review, April 1896.
- "A Mistaken Imperial Celebration," The Nineteenth Century, Vol. XL, July/December 1896.
- "Alexis de Tocqueville's 'Recollections' and Self-Revelations," The Forum, February 1898.
- "The Strife of Tongues in Belgium," The Scottish Review, Vol. XXXI, January/April 1898.
- "The Siege of Paris and the Airships," The North American Review, April 1898.
- "In Years of Storm and Stress," Part III, Part IV, The Cornhill Magazine, Vol. V, New Series, July/December 1898; Vol. VII, July/December 1899.
- "Odin and the Royal Family of England," The Scottish Review, Vol. XXXIII, January/April 1899.
- "The Transvaal War and European Opinion," The North American Review, December 1899.
- "Wayland the Smith," The Scottish Review, Vol. XXXV, April 1900.
- "France, Russia and the Peace of the World," The Living Age, Vol. CCXXVI, N°. 2928, August 1900.
- "Sir Francis Barry's New Excavations of Brochs," The Gentleman's Magazine, Vol. CCXC, January/June 1901.
- "The Kaiser's Speeches and German History," The Forum, June 1901.
- "English Neglect of Old Indian Poetry," The Forum, September 1901.
- "Crispi and Italian Unity," The Forum, November 1901.
- "The Strange Origin of the 'Marseillaise'," The Nineteenth Century and After, Vol. L, July/December 1901.
- "A Pre-Historic Sun-Chariot in Denmark." In: Saga-Book of the Viking Club, Vol. III, Viking Society for Northern Research, 1902.
- "The Prorogued Turkish Parliament," The North American Review, July 1902.
- "Personal Recollections of Virchow," The North American Review, November 1902.
- "Why Germany Strengthens Her Navy," The North American Review, May 1903.
- "Macedonia and England's Policy," The Nineteenth Century and After, Vol. LIV, July/December 1903.
- "The Germans in the United States," The Westminster Review, Vol. CLIX, 1903.
- "French Republican Leaders and European Peace," The Westminster Review, Vol. CLIX, 1903.
- "The New Naval Base and Russian Designs," The Westminster Review, Vol. CLIX, 1903.
- "The 'Woden' Pedigree of the Royal Family of England," The Westminster Review, Vol. CLIX, 1903.
- "Does Russia Represent Aryan Civilization?," The North American Review, June 1904.
- "Czarism at Bay," The North American Review, October 1904.
- "Germany and War Scares in England," The Nineteenth Century and After, Vol. LVIII, July/December 1905.
- "An Unexpected French War-Cry Against Germany," The North American Review, Vol. XVI, November 1906.
- "The Paris National Workshops of 1848," The Nineteenth Century, Vol. LX, July/December 1906.
- "The Storm Centre in the Near East," The North American Review, Vol. 184, 1907.
- "The New Situation in Germany," The Living Age, Vol. XXXV, No. 3274, April 1907.

In 1897 he contributed an autobiographical sketch to the Cornhill Magazine, London.
