= The Monthly Packet =

British magazine

The Monthly Packet was an English magazine published between 1851 and 1899, founded by members of the Oxford Movement to counter Anglo-Catholic extremism. It was strongly influenced by its first editor, the novelist Charlotte Mary Yonge, with aims of providing instruction, entertainment and improvement. Other, unstated aims were to encourage interest in education, missionary work, and charity.

== Content changes ==
The Monthly Packet of Evening Readings for Younger Members of the English Church, as shown in "The Introductory Letter" in Volume 1, was targeted at middle and upper-class Anglican girls. Evidence suggests readership actually included males, adults and members of the lower classes. (By July, 1880, the word "Younger" had been dropped from the title.)

The magazine encouraged attitudes that included the prevailing view of religious and social standards. Over time, the approach was modified: Anglo-Catholic contributions were accepted, and it became more tolerant of Roman Catholicism and Nonconformism. It came to recognize that certain ills in society, such as poverty and ignorance, needed to be addressed. There was less emphasis on submission and obedience.

== Literary history ==
The Monthly Packet was the first periodical to publish Lewis Carroll's short stories, which were later compiled into A Tangled Tale. Other literary contributors included Rosa Nouchette Carey with her novel Heriot's Choice in 1879.

== Charlotte Yonge ==
Charlotte Mary Yonge as a churchwoman was influenced by John Keble, one of the leaders of the Oxford Movement. She combined editing The Monthly Packet with writing novels, biography, history, school textbooks, and pieces for her magazine. To some extent, the magazine can be seen as an expression of her personality and beliefs. She describes her audience in the first editorial as "daughters of our own beloved Catholic church in England" (meaning that the Church of England is by definition a part of the universal church). However, unusual work such as that by Lewis Carroll was also included. In 1891 the novelist Christabel Coleridge became the assistant editor. She was sole editor from 1894.

The magazine offers insights into Victorian life, especially regarding religious attitudes. Other subjects of interest are history, education, sociology and women's studies.
