= Lilith, The Legend of the First Woman =

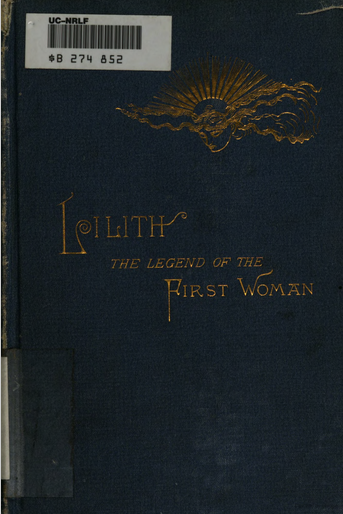
- The cover of Lilith, The Legend of the First Woman
- Author: Ada Langworthy Collier
- Language: English
- Genre: Poetry
- Publisher: D Lothrop & Company
- Publication date: 1885 (1st edition)
- Publication place: United States
- Media type: Print (hardcover)
- Pages: 104 pp (hardcover 1st edition)
- ISBN: 9781539928478 (hardcover 1st edition)

Lilith, The Legend of the First Woman is a 19th-century narrative poem in five books, written by the American poet, Ada Langworthy Collier, in 1885, and published in Boston by D Lothrop & Company. It has been reprinted several times in the 21st century.

Lilith, The Legend of the First Woman is a 19th-century rendition of the old rabbinical legend of Lilith, the first woman, whose life story was dropped unrecorded from the early world, and whose home, hope, and Eden were passed to another woman. The author warns us in her preface that she has not followed the legend closely. In her hands, Lilith becomes an embodiment of mother-love that existed forever, and it is her name that lends its itself to the lullabys repeated to young children.

== Literary basis ==
Collier not only freely changes the legend of Lilith, but is free with the unities of her own story. It is full of internal inconsistencies in narrative, and anachronisms. The legend (doubtless made to reconcile the two accounts in the Book of Genesis of the creation of woman, the first of which represents her made with man, and by implication, coequal; and the other as created second and subordinate), is to the effect that God first created Adam and Lilith, equal in authority; that the clashing this led to was so great, that Lilith was cast out from Eden, and the marital experiment tried again, on a different principle, by the creation of Eve.

Lilith thereafter wedded Eblis, the prince of devils, and became the mother of demons and specters; and in vengeance upon her rival, Eve, the mother of mankind, became the special enemy of babies, whom she strangles with a thread of her golden hair. The obvious injustice to Lilith— who seems to have asked no more than her fair half, while Adam was the encroacher, on the assumption that they were created equal —inspired Collier's version of the legend, according to which Lilith leaves Eden voluntarily, rather than submit to dominance, but loses thereby the blessing of motherhood. This alone, not either Adam or Eden, she envies Eve, and at last steals the coveted first human baby, which dies, bereft of its mother, and so gives Lilith the reputation in legend of being a child-murderess.

When Collier discovered that the word "lullaby" (Lilla, abi—begone, Lilith!) denoted the songs which mothers soothed their babies, she adapted Lilith's acquired modern meaning, wholly removed from its original signification, into this poem. It enabled Collier to evolve the idea that Lilith, instead of being a fiend, was really a creature of strong maternal instincts and it is in this character that Lilith was presented.

== Plot ==
Created Adam's equal alike in stature, strength and power, Lilith's spirit is chafed by Adam's insistence on his own supremacy and her subjection, and rather than yield she chooses to find her own paradise without the walls.

"In goodly Eden, Adam, safely bide,
But I. for peace, nor love, nor life," she cried,
"Submit to thee."

According to Collier's narrative, Lilith, having left the Garden of Eden, never to return, goes out into the world. For a time, she enjoys the pleasure in Nature's companionship. Far from Eden, she finds a beautiful land where she can rule supreme, though lonely. It is here that she is wooed by Eblis, the fallen angel and prince of the powers of the air, who forgets to mourn the heaven he lost in the heaven of Lilith's love.

Unheeded, swiftly passed them o'er—
Glad summer days -till one hour softly laid
At Lilith's feet a fair lone babe that strayed
From distant Dreamland far. So might one deem
That looked upon its fuce: or; it might seem
From other climes a rose leaf blown apart.
Down drifted there to gladden Lilith's heart.

Eblis woos Lilith and she becomes his wife. Lilith's children are little imps without affection for her or her maternal yearnings; in fact, they torture her. When Lilith starts thinking about Eden, Eblis takes her there and, upon looking over its wall, she is annoyed to see Adam with another wife, Eve, who is breastfeeding. Lilith's discovery that she has been supplanted and that Eve's child loves its mother, arouses jealousy and later, Lilith steals the baby, devoting all her affectionate and attention to it, but the child subsequently grows ill. After Adam and Eve are driven from the Garden, Lilith relents and takes the child back to its mother, in whose arms it afterwards dies, and Lilith returns to her own land.

There looking on the sea.

Low-voiced, she sang. So sweet the idle song,
She said: "From Paradise, forgotten long,
It comes. An elfin echo that doth rise
Upward from summer seas to bending skies.
In coming days, from any earthly shore
It shall not fail. And sweet forever more
Shall make my memory. That witching strain
Pale Lilith's love shall lightly breathe again.
And Lilith's bitter loss and olden pain
O'er every cradle wake that sweet refrain.
My memory still shall bloom. It cannot die
While rings Earth's, cradle-song-—sweet lullaby."

== Criticism ==
Wakeman stated that Lilith is described as a graceful creation, but the effect of her appearance might have been enhanced if Eblis had been pictured darker in character. Eve is described as love and tenderness, while Adam's characteristics are not strongly marked. The poem has many beautiful, descriptive passages. It is generally smooth in its metrical expression, employing iambics. Kerr critiqued that while the story's verse was unequaled, the poem lacks sustained power. A certain looseness in the construction of sentences implies that the work didn't undergo much revision. In a third review it is said that while Collier's descriptive powers were analytical and microscopic, there is a sameness which results in too often exhibiting one picture in different lights.
