= Adoré Floupette =

Collective pseudonym of authors Henri Beauclair and Gabriel Vicaire

Adoré Floupette is the collective pseudonym of French authors Henri Beauclair and Gabriel Vicaire used for their 1885 literary spoof titled Les Déliquescences d'Adoré Floupette, a collection of poems satirising French symbolism and the Decadent movement.

Stanley Chapman's translation was published by the Atlas Press.

The Australian author David Brooks argued in his 2011 book, The Sons of Clovis, that the Ern Malley hoax was modelled on this work.
