= Mathilde Weber =

German feminist and social worker

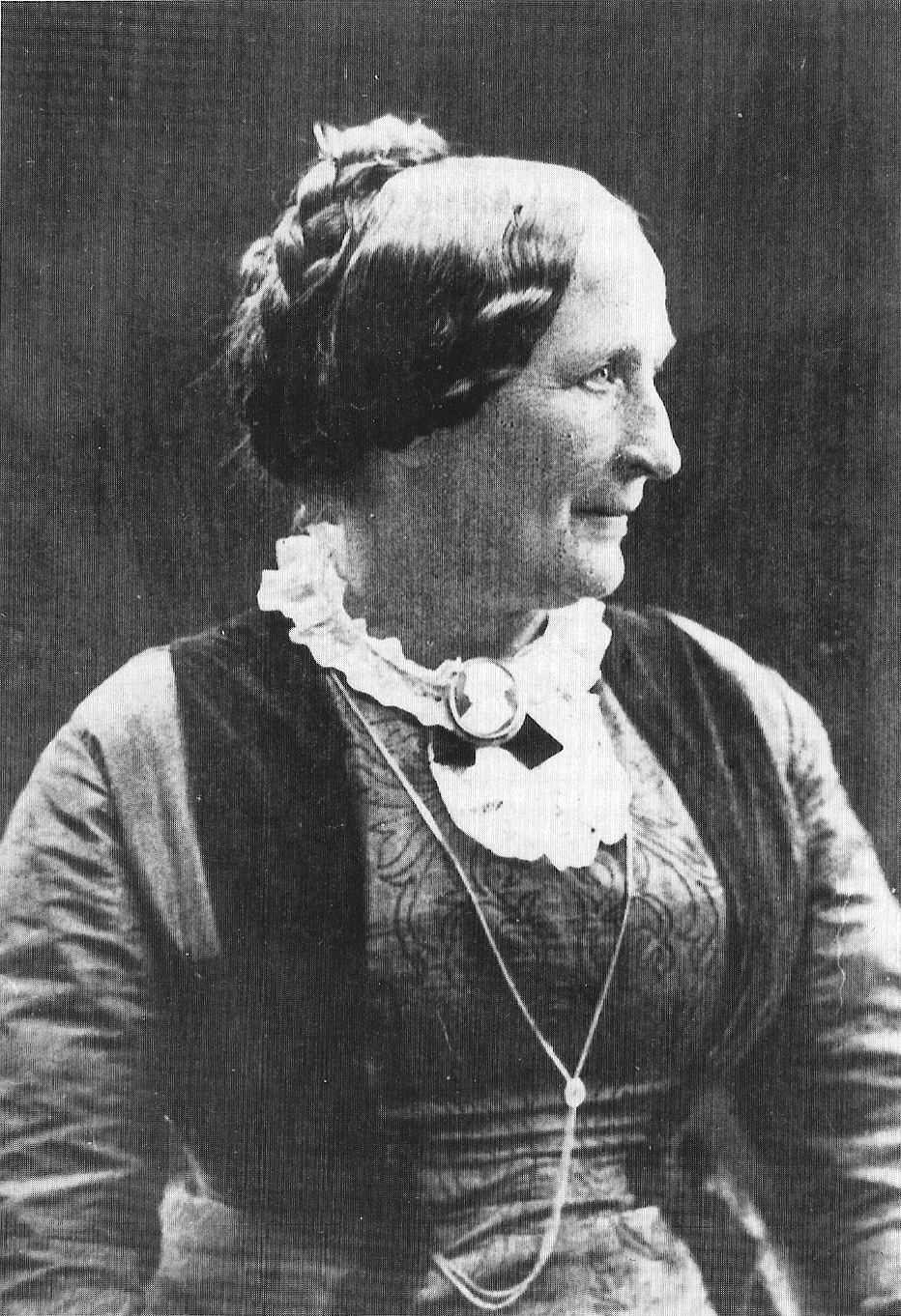
- Born: Mathilde Walz; 16 August 1829; Ellwangen, Germany
- Died: 22 June 1901 (aged 71); Tübingen, Germany
- Spouse: Heinrich Weber

Mathilde Weber (1829–1901), was a German feminist and social worker, regarded as one of the founders of the German women's movement. She focused on getting academic studies available for women.

== Life ==
Weber née Walz was born on 16 August 1829 in Ellwangen, Germany. She was married to Heinrich Weber (1818-1890).

Weber was involved with the German women's movement and advocated for women to receive training to join the workforce. This included training as domestic servant. She established the Verein für Tübinger Honoratiorentöchter (Association for Tübingen Dignitary Daughters). In 1899 in Tübingen she was given the title Wohltäterin der Stadt (benefactress of the city).

She died on 22 June 1901 in Tübingen, Germany.

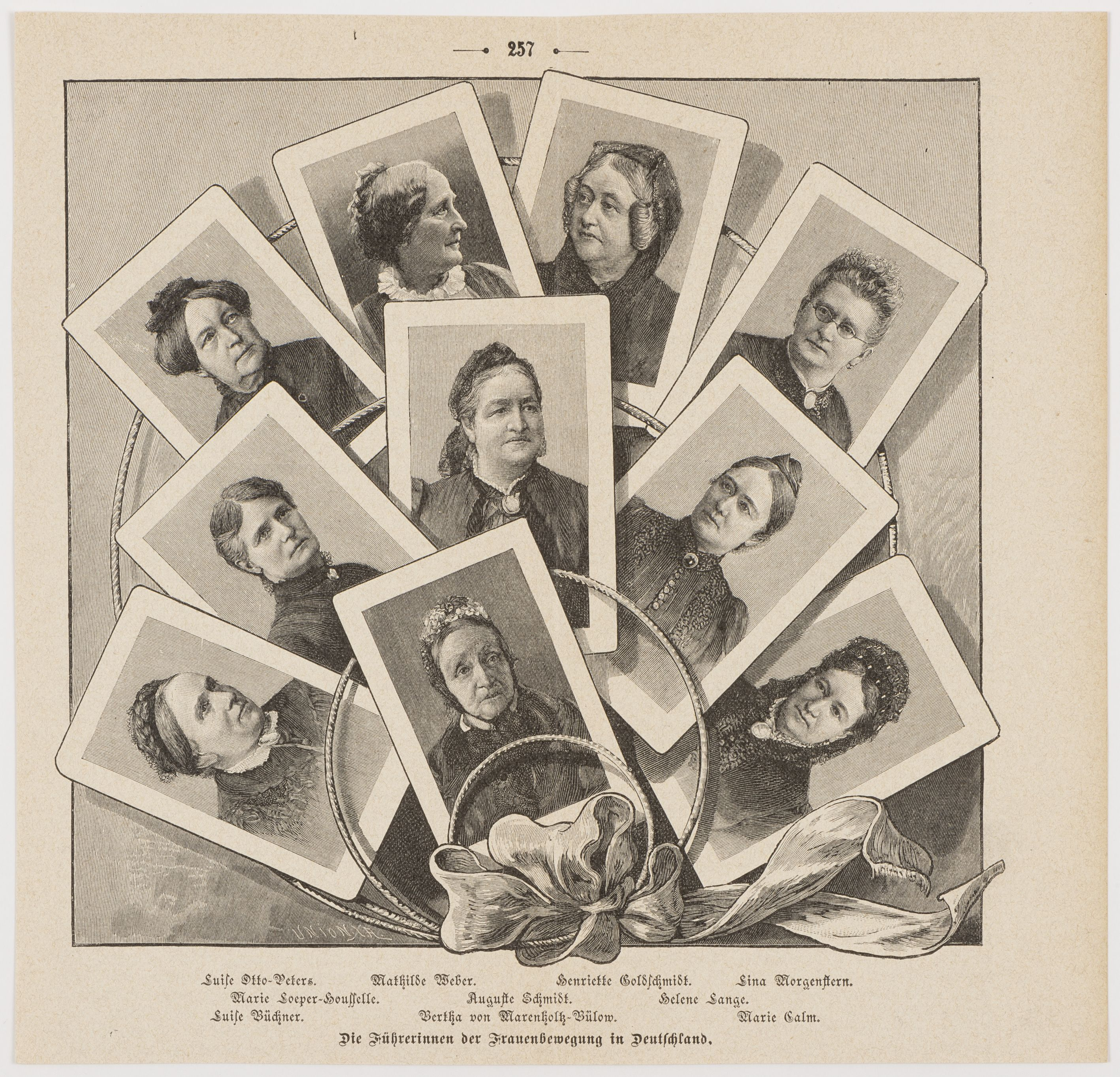
Führerinnen der Frauenbewegung in Deutschland 1894
