= Mathilde Blind =

German-born English writer 1841–1896

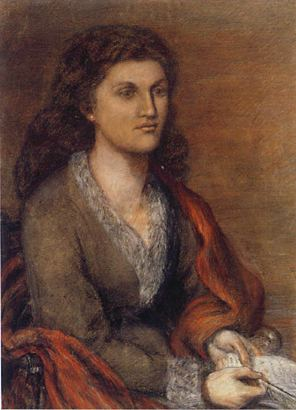
- Chalk portrait of Mathilde Blind by Lucy Madox Brown, 1872
- Born: Mathilde Cohen; 21 March 1841; Mannheim, German Confederation
- Died: 26 November 1896 (aged 55); London, UK
- Resting place: St Pancras Cemetery, East Finchley, London
- Occupations: poet, woman of letters

Mathilde Blind (born Mathilda Cohen; 21 March 1841 – 26 November 1896), was a German-born English poet, fiction writer, biographer, essayist and critic. In the early 1870s she emerged as a pioneering female aesthete in a mostly male community of artists and writers. By the late 1880s she had become prominent among New Woman writers such as Vernon Lee (Violet Paget), Amy Levy, Mona Caird, Olive Schreiner, Rosamund Marriott Watson, and Katharine Tynan. She was praised by Algernon Charles Swinburne, William Michael Rossetti, Amy Levy, Edith Nesbit, Arthur Symons and Arnold Bennett. Her much-discussed poem The Ascent of Man presents a distinctly feminist response to the Darwinian theory of evolution.

== Early life ==
Blind was born in Mannheim, Germany, the older child of a banker named Jacob Abraham Cohen and his own second wife, born Friederike Ettlinger. She had a brother, Ferdinand, two half-brothers (Meyer Jacob "Max" Cohen, from his father's first marriage, and Rudolf, from the marriage of Friederike and Karl Blind), and a half-sister, Ottilie, also from the marriage of Friederike and Karl Blind. Cohen died in 1848, the same year her mother remarried to Karl Blind, who was involved in the Baden insurrection of 1848. They immigrated to London in 1852, and it was around the time of the move that she took her stepfather's name.

In London, Blind attended the Ladies' Institute, St John's Wood, where she was a friend of future novelist Rosa Nouchette Carey. Much of the evidence for this period in Blind's life is contained in a 55-page typescript in the British Library, a fragmentary story of a precocious, rebellious girl who is expelled from the Ladies' Institute for her freethinking, and who then travels to Switzerland for a long stay with maternal relatives in Zürich, before embarking on an unaccompanied walking tour through the Alps – highly unusual at that time for a single woman. The protagonist's name in the typescript is Alma, but her experiences parallel closely those of Blind herself, and some of the names in the Zürich section of the narrative are those of people Blind actually knew in her adolescent years.

While in Switzerland she was barred as a woman from entry to lectures at the University of Zürich, but spent much time in the company of revolutionary colleagues of her mother and stepfather. She also took private lessons from the renowned philosopher and Sanscrit scholar Kuno Fischer. In 1854 Fischer had begun work on his History of Modern Philosophy: Descartes and His School, completed in 1865, which among other things had a direct influence on Friedrich Nietzsche. In Fischer's account of Baruch Spinoza and his ideas, Nietzsche recognized a kindred philosophical spirit. The two philosophers share a radical philosophy of immanence and the negation of all transcendence, a philosophical outlook also shared by Ludwig Feuerbach and by David Strauss, whose The Old Faith and the New: A Confession Blind translated 23 years after studying with Fischer. All four thinkers, and the adult Blind, reject teleology – the idea that there is an end goal or ultimate purpose to things. For them the immanent world, devoid of inherent purpose, constitutes the horizon of being and the sole possible source of value. This philosophical outlook informs all of Blind's writing, and caused the publisher of The Prophecy of St. Oran and Other Poems, Newman & Co., to withdraw the book from circulation. As William Michael Rossetti wrote to Ford Madox Brown, Newman & Co. "had got frightened by somebody about the atheistic character of the book, and had determined to sell it no more".

In 1866, Blind's brother Ferdinand failed in an attempt to assassinate Otto von Bismarck, then chancellor of the North German Confederation, and committed suicide in prison. He was motivated in part by his stepfather Karl Blind and other revolutionary exiles living in London, who were outraged by the way Bismarck treated the German states like pawns in his empire-building strategy. Many years later, Blind shared with her friend Moncure Conway the contents of a letter she had received from her brother in the spring of 1866. She and Ferdinand had been apart since 1864, when he left London in his 18th year to study in Germany. During his university years he also participated in the left-wing opposition to Bismarck, and after graduating in March 1866, during a hiking tour of Bavaria and Bohemia, he wrote to Blind describing the depth of his opposition to Bismarck: "As I wandered through the blooming fields of Germany, that were so soon to be crushed under the iron heel of war and saw the number of youths pass by that were to lose their lives for the selfish aims of the few, the thought came quite spontaneously to punish the cause of so much evil, even if it were at the cost of my life." The first, pseudonymous volume of poetry she published in the wake of Ferdinand's death (Poems, published by Claude Lake, 1867) is dedicated to her early mentor, the Italian revolutionary Giuseppe Mazzini, but the poems themselves also evoke the memory of Ferdinand. As James Diedrick remarked, the book "gains both biographical and literary significance when viewed as a 'double-voiced' volume that simultaneously celebrates Mazzini's victorious republicanism and obliquely honors Ferdinand, his ghostly double, whose squandered idealism and sacrifice haunt the margins of its pages."

Blind's early political affiliations were shaped by the foreign refugees who frequented her stepfather's house, including Giuseppe Mazzini, for whom she entertained a passionate admiration and about whom she would publish reminiscences in the Fortnightly Review in 1891. Other revolutionaries who frequent her mother and stepfather's house in St. John's Wood included Karl Marx and Louis Blanc. Her early commitment to women's suffrage was influenced by her mother's friend Caroline Ashurst Stansfeld, who was active in the British feminist movement from its origins in the 1840s. These radical affiliations are manifested in Blind's politically charged poetry, and in her own unbending commitment to reform. As Richard Garnett observed, in the society of political refugees and radicals Blind was raised in, "admiration must necessarily be reserved for audacity in enterprise, fortitude in adversity... anything breathing unconquerable defiance of the powers that were."

== Career ==
In the early 1870s, after abandoning the male pseudonym she used for her first volume of verse, Blind emerged as a force to be reckoned with in London's literary bohemia. In early January 1870 she delivered a lecture on Percy Bysshe Shelley at the Church of Progress in London, stressing the poet's political radicalism. In July of that year she published a review-essay on William Michael Rossetti's edition of The Poetical Works of Percy Bysshe Shelley in The Westminster Review that earned the praise of Algernon Charles Swinburne and gained her entry into a formerly all-male group of "Shelleyites" that included Swinburne, Rossetti, and Richard Garnett, a man who would remain Blind's friend and literary adviser throughout her life. A year after this essay appeared, Blind began publishing poetry and nonfiction in Dark Blue, a new Oxford-based journal that during its short run published prose and art by many of Britain's leading Pre-Raphaelites and aesthetes. Her wide-ranging publications in this journal are those of a daring feminist aesthete: she wrote sexually subversive poems about haunted lovers, an erudite essay on Icelandic poetry, and a short story exploring the corrosive effects of class divisions on human relations. In the fall of 1872, as her association with Dark Blue was ending, she began reviewing contemporary poetry and fiction for the Athenaeum, where over the next 15 years she passed judgement on a wide range of contemporary writers, ranging from William Morris to Margaret Oliphant. At the end of 1871 she published Selections from the Poems of Percy Bysshe Shelley for the Tauchnitz Collection of British Authors, containing an introductory "Memoir" of Shelley's life. In the following year, she brought out her translation of David Strauss's The Old Faith and the New: A Confession, which established her reputation as a daring freethinker, following in the footsteps of George Eliot, who had translated The Life of Jesus in 1853. The generic range of these early works (poetry, fiction, criticism, biography, translation), as well as their subject matter and themes (female autonomy and agency, anti-theism, aestheticism, the relationship of literary and political radicalism), indicates the aesthetic principles and themes that would characterize the remainder of Blind's career, while emphasizing the cosmopolitan nature of her sensibility and outlook.

Despite her diverse literary interests, Blind remained devoted to poetry, as is evident in an 1869 letter to Richard Garnett: "My only real intense life has been for a long time in writing, and when I cannot swim and float about in the enchanted waters of poetry I am like a fish out of water. I gasp and pant for want of the proper element to breathe in." Blind's visits to Scotland in the 1870s and 1880s inspired two poems of considerable compass and ambition: the narrative poem "The Prophecy of St. Oran" (published in 1881, but written some years earlier) and The Heather on Fire (1886), a denunciation of the Highland clearances. Both are full of impassioned eloquence and energy, and "The Prophecy" in particular has an ample share of the quality Matthew Arnold called "Celtic magic".

As Blind's reputation as a poet began to rise in the 1880s, she undertook a number of other ambitious literary projects, including two highly praised biographies for the Eminent Women Series edited by John Henry Ingram. The first of these was also the first biography of the novelist George Eliot (1883; new edition 1888), and the second was a life of Madame Roland (1886), one of the leaders of the Girondins faction during the French Revolution. While writing the latter she lived mainly in Manchester, to be near the painter Ford Madox Brown (who was involved in decorating the town hall with frescoes) and his wife. Brown also painted Blind's portrait during this period. Brown and Blind were emotionally intimate from the mid-1870s until Brown's death in 1893, although this devotion caused considerable turmoil in his family.

Blind's only novel, Tarantella, a prose romance, is a remarkable work in many ways, but was neither a commercial nor a popular success. Richard Garnett wrote that "the fate of this remarkable book is one of the injustices of literature." Noting that "it has an exciting story, interesting characters, ease and naturalness of dialogue," and "is the receptacle of much of the writer's most serious thought and intense personal feeling," Garnett attributes the novel's failure to attract a wide audience to the preference for realism and the "minute analysis of character" in the mid-1880s. Tarantella, by contrast, "is very romantic, very idealistic, very eloquent, and not in the least concerned with minutiae." Garnett concludes that "now that the taste for romance has revived," Blind's novel "ought to have another chance of taking its rightful place." While the novel was translated into French in 1893, and reprinted in a single-volume format the same year by T. Fisher Unwin, its coexistence alongside similarly philosophical fictions, including Vernon Lee's A Phantom Lover (1890), Olive Schreiner's Dreams (1890), and Oscar Wilde's The Portrait of Dorian Gray (1891), did not improve its fortunes.

In 1889, Blind published The Ascent of Man, whose title poem is an ambitious response to Charles Darwin's theory of evolution. The poem was widely reviewed and discussed and did much to enhance Blind's reputation; in the 20 July issue of the Athenaeum the reviewer breathlessly reported that "we have known her book to be read on the Underground Railway, and the reader to be so absorbed... as to be carried unawares several stations past his destination." The importance of this poem was later reinforced by an 1899 edition with an introduction by the evolutionary biologist Alfred Russel Wallace.

In 1890, Blind was the subject of a profile in Woman, the magazine that Arnold Bennett would write for and edit in the 1890s. "A Chat With Mathilde Blind" in the "Notes on Notables" section of the 3 July issue begins by stating that "everyone familiar with the current thought and literature of the day knows the name of Mathilde Blind." The anonymous writer then praises in turn "the admirable Life of Madame Roland... certainly the most graphic and accurate picture of the great revolutionary heroine ever penned in England, or, for that matter, in France," and Tarantella, a "quaint, weird story, full of imagination and suggested thought." However, "it is as a poetess that Miss Blind has scored her greatest triumphs," the writer continues, noting that the verses in The Prophecy of St. Oran and Other Poems "made an instant mark, many of them becoming rapidly popular," and adding that "The Heather on Fire, 'The Sower', 'The Dead', and 'The Street Children's Dance' are even now being constantly reprinted wherever the English language is read and spoken throughout the world." After recording that Blind considers The Ascent of Man her magnum opus, the writer describes the sensation caused by Blind's translation of The Journal of Marie Bashkirtseff (1890), "that strange laying bare of a woman's soul, only to be compared in its nude intensity to the confessions of Jean Jacques Rousseau and Le Journal des Goncourt."

Blind travelled widely in Italy and Egypt in the early 1890s, partly drawn by the love of nature and antiquity and partly due to her failing health. The influence of these travels is manifest in Dramas in Miniature (1891), Songs and Sonnets (1893), and especially Birds of Passage (1895). Arnold Bennett's pseudonymous review of Birds of Passage in the 22 May issue of Woman, when he was assistant editor of the magazine, indicates the quality of poetry Blind was writing just a few years before her death. "Miss Blind sings in many modes—she is probably more various than any other woman-poet in English literature," Bennett writes, "and in all her songs there is an original, intimately personal accent which one can catch, but not imprison within a paragraph." Bennett adds that Blind "excels in lyric verse," noting that many of the poems in the new volume, including "Prelude" and "A Fantasy", "are distinguished achievements, and they show, I think, a more complete technique than anything even in Dramas in Miniature. While admiring the "Songs of the Orient" in the volume, Bennett concludes that "for myself I would rather have her sing of England. Take the fine poem 'Noonday Rest', written on Hampstead Heath under the willows—'Sometimes they lose a leaf, which, flickering slow,/Faints on the sunburnt leas.' How wonderfully [this] suggests the intolerable heat of a scorching noon! This poem is perhaps the best in the book, a book that contains nothing trivial, nothing shallow, nothing that is not poetry."

Blind died in London on 26 November 1896, bequeathing to Newnham College, Cambridge, the greater part of her property, which had mostly come to her late in life as a legacy from a half-brother Meyer Jacob ("Max") Cohen. She was cremated in Woking, and her ashes were later placed in a monument erected by a friend and sponsor, Ludwig Mond, and designed by Édouard Lantéri in St Pancras Cemetery.

== Works ==
- Poems, under the pseudonym "Claude Lake" (1867)
- "Shelley", a review of The Poetical Works of Percy Bysshe Shelley, with notes and a memoir by W. M. Rossetti, Westminster Review (July 1870)
- The Old Faith and the New: A Confession by David Friedrich Strauss, a translation from the German (1873; revised third edition with biographical essay on Strauss, 1874)
- "Mary Wollstonecraft", biographical essay, New Quarterly Magazine (July 1878)
- The Prophecy of St. Oran and Other Poems (1881)
- George Eliot, the first biography of the novelist (1883)
- Tarantella: A Romance (1885)
- The Heather on Fire: A Tale of the Highland Clearances (1886)
- Madame Roland, a biography (1886)
- "Shelley's View of Nature Contrasted With Darwin's", a lecture (1886)
- "Marie Bashkirtseff, The Russian Painter", a two-part biographical essay in the Woman's World (1888)
- The Ascent of Man (1889)
- The Journal of Marie Bashkirtseff, a translation from the French of the Russian-born painter's journal (1890)
- Dramas in Miniature (1891)
- Songs and Sonnets (1893)
- Birds of Passage: Songs of the Orient and Occident (1895)
- A Selection from the Poems of Mathilde Blind, edited by A. Symons (1897)
- The Ascent of Man, new edition with new "Introductory Note" by the evolutionary biologist Alfred R. Wallace (1899)
- The Poetical Works of Mathilde Blind, edited by Arthur Symons, with a memoir by Richard Garnett (1900)

== Assessment ==
More recently Blind has attracted the attention of women's literature scholars. As one website puts it, "Her burning sense of political and social injustice runs like a unifying thread through her work. Her poetry combines great beauty of sound and image with vigorous narrative, delineation of character, emotional expressiveness, and engagement with intellectual ideas." The site mentions George Eliot, George Sand and Elizabeth Barrett Browning as her influences. Isobel Armstrong, re-evaluating the longer works, notably "The Heather on Fire" and The Ascent of Man", saw in them "a gendered tradition in women's poetry of the nineteenth century". She noted that Blind, by re-configuring "a new myth of creativity and gender", demonstrated the best that this tradition could achieve in social and political analysis.
