= Ada Langworthy Collier =

American writer (1843–1919)

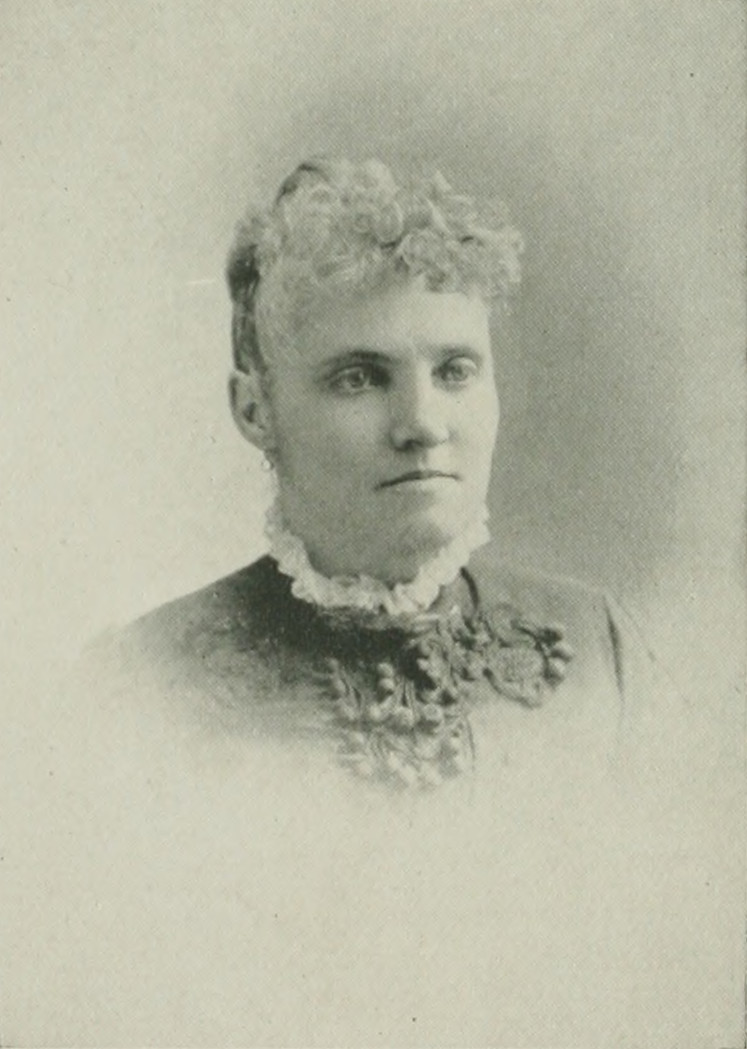
- Photo in A Woman of the Century
- Born: Ada Langworthy; December 23, 1843; Dubuque, Iowa Territory, US
- Died: August 6, 1919 (aged 75)
- Resting place: Linwood Cemetery, Dubuque, Iowa
- Education: Lasell Seminary
- Occupation: author
- Spouse: Robert Hutchison Collier
- Children: James Currie Collier
- Parent: Lucius Hart Langworthy
- Writing career
- Pen name: Anna L. Cunningham, Marguerite
- Genres: sketches, short stories, poems, novels
- Notable works: Lilith, The Legend of the First Woman

Ada Langworthy Collier (née, Langworthy; pen names Anna L. Cunningham and Marguerite; December 23, 1843 – August 6, 1919) was an American author from Iowa. She wrote sketches, short stories, poems, and several novels. Collier is remembered for Lilith, The Legend of the First Woman (1885).

== Early life and education ==
Ada Langworthy was born in Dubuque, Iowa, December 23, 1843, in the first frame house ever built within the present bounds of the State of Iowa. She was a descendant of James Langworthy, of Vermont; and Sergt. Jonathan Massey and Jonathan Woodbury, of New Hampshire; and a granddaughter of Dr. Stephen Langworthy and Betsey Massey. Her father, Lucius Hart Langworthy, a descendant of New England pioneers, was among the first to explore the lead regions of Iowa, and he was one of the founders of the city of Dubuque. Her mother, Valeria A. Bemis, was a member of an old Baltimore family. Though she lived a pioneer life, she did not face the hardships known by others. The lead mines made her father and his brothers wealthy, and soon a group of brick mansions were built on a bluff above the city, where the family lived.

In early girlhood, Collier studied at a Dubuque girls' school taught by Catharine Beecher. Afterward, she went to Lasell Seminary, Auburndale, Massachusetts, graduating in 1861, at the age of 17, even though she had been ill with "brain fever".

== Career ==
Collier began to write for periodicals at a young age. She was the author of many sketches, tales and short poems, of several novels, and of one long, narrative poem, "Lilith" (Boston, 1885); the last was her greatest work. She occasionally used pen names, including "Anna L. Cunningham" and "Marguerite".

Collier was a leader in club work in Dubuque, serving as president of the Dubuque Ladies' Literary Association, and auditor of the Iowa Federation of Women's Clubs.

== Personal life ==
On October 15, 1867, she married Robert Hutchison Collier (1842–1896). They had one child, James Currie Collier (b. 1869).

Ada Langworthy Collier died August 6, 1919.

== Selected works ==
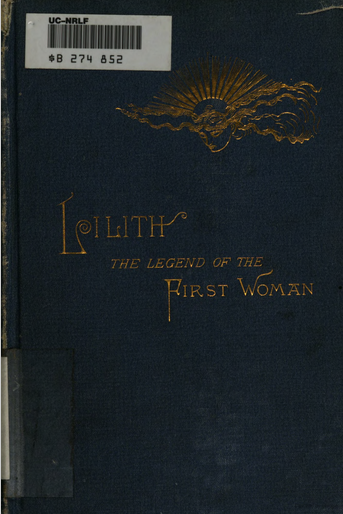
"Lilith The Legend of the First Woman"

- 1885, "Lilith, The Legend of the First Woman"
- n.d., On the Edge of a New Land, Chapters I–V
- n.d., On the Edge of a New Land, Chapters XII–XV
- n.d., On the Edge of a New Land, Chapters XVI–XIX
- n.d., On the Edge of a New Land, Chapters XX–XXV
- n.d. On the Edge of a New Land, Chapters XXV–XXX
- n.d., Lilies
- n.d., Psyche
- n.d., Rondeau
- n.d., "A Day's Ramble" (travel sketch)
- n.d., "Among the Mountain Mists" (travel sketch)

== See also ==
- Langworthy Historic District
