= Henri Beauclair =

French poet, novelist, and journalist (1860–1919)

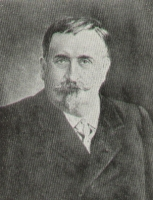
Henri Beauclair, 1914

Henri Eugène Amédée Beauclair (December 21, 1860 at Lisieux – May 11, 1919 in Paris) was a French poet, novelist, and journalist. He was the chief editor of the daily newspaper Le Petit Journal from 1906 to 1914. He worked for a number of publications, including Lutèce, Le Chat noir, Le Procope, journal parlé (1893–1898), and Le Sagittaire, a monthly revue of art and literature (1900–1901).

He had a taste and an unquestionable talent for satire and pastiche. He collaborated with poet Gabriel Vicaire, with whom he wrote the famous Déliquescences of Adoré Floupette (1885), a parody of the Decadent movement in poetry which caused several months of vigorous debate within Parisian literary circles.

== Works ==
Poetry

- L'Eternelle chanson, triolets (1884)
- Les Déliquescences d'Adoré Floupette (1885)
- Les Horizontales (1885)
- Pentecôte (1886)

Novels and essays

- Le Pantalon de Madame Desnou (1886)
- Ohé ! l'Artiste (1887)
- La Ferme à Goron (1888)
- Une heure chez M. Barrès par un faux Renan (1890)
- Tapis vert (1897)
