= Louis-Gabriel-Charles Vicaire =

French poet (1848–1900)

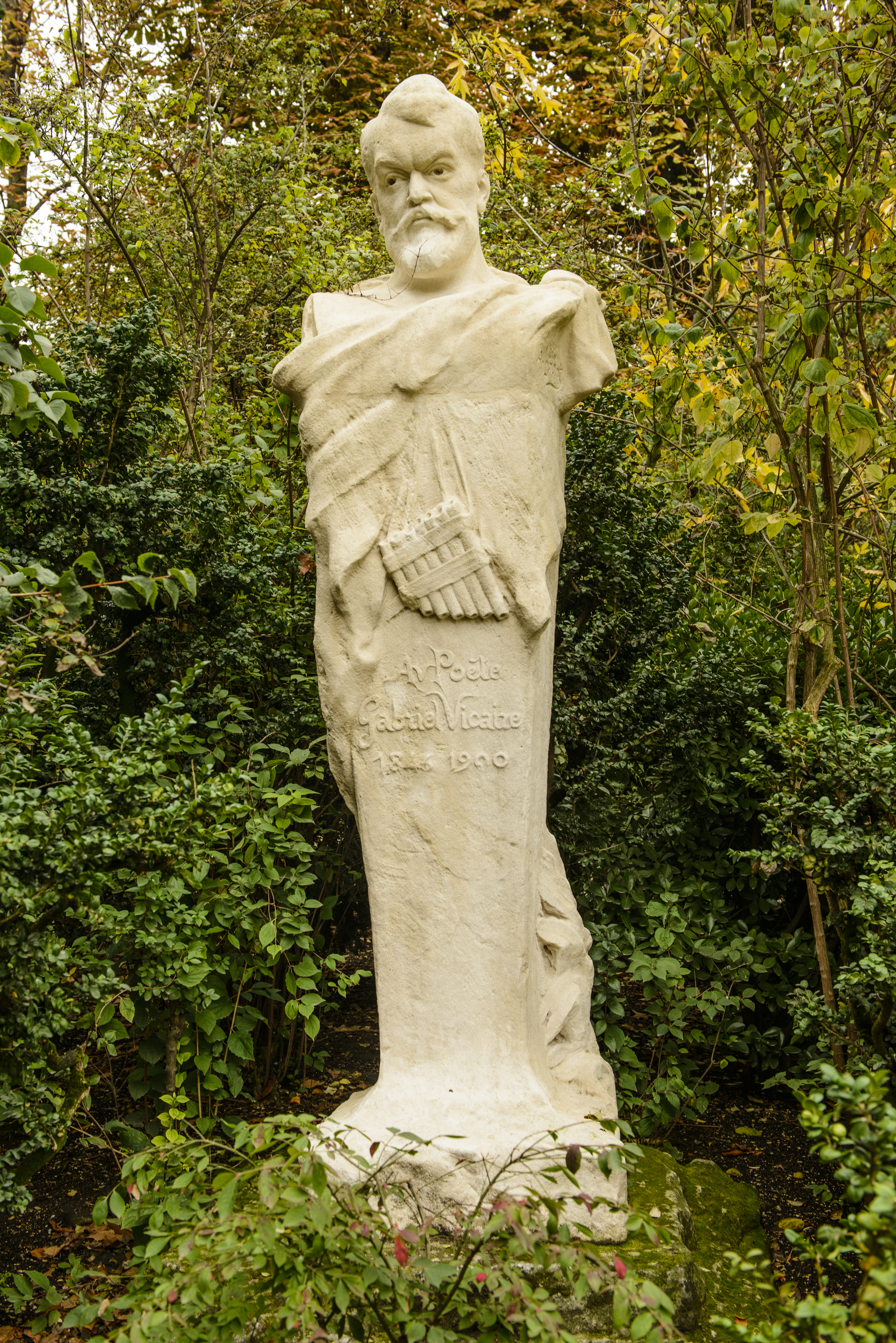
Marble bust of Vicaire in the Jardin du Luxembourg, Paris, by Jean Antoine Injalbert

Louis Gabriel Charles Vicaire (January 25, 1848 – September 23, 1900) was a French poet.

== Life ==
Vicaire was born at Belfort. He served in the campaign of 1870, and then settled in Paris to practise at the bar, which, however, he soon abandoned for literature.

His work was twice "crowned" by the Académie française, and in 1892 he received the cross of the Legion of Honour. Born in the Vosges, and a Parisian by adoption, Vicaire remained all his life an enthusiastic lover of the country to which his family belonged (in Bresse), spending much of his time at Ambérieu-en-Bugey. His freshest and best work is his Emaux bressans (1884), a volume of poems full of the gaiety and spirit of the old French chansons. Other volumes followed: Le Livre de la patrie, L'Heure enchantée (1890), A la bonne franquette (1892), Au bois joli (1894) and Le Clos des fées (1897).

Vicaire wrote in collaboration with Jules Truffier two short pieces for the stage, Fleurs d'avril (1890) and La Farce du marl refondu (1895); also the Miracle de Saint Nicolas (1888). With his friend Henri Beauclair he produced a parody of the Decadents entitled Les Deliquescences and signed Adoré Floupette. His fame rests on his Emaux bressans and on his Rabelaisian drinking songs; the religious and fairy poems, charming as they often are, carry simplicity to the verge of affectation. Vicaire died in Paris, after a long and painful illness, on 23 September 1900.
