= 1972 in Australian literature =

This article presents a list of the historical events and publications of Australian literature during 1972.

== Events ==
- Thomas Keneally becomes the first Australian to be shortlisted for the Booker Prize for Fiction for The Chant of Jimmie Blacksmith.

== Major publications ==
=== Books ===
- Thea Astley – The Acolyte
- Russell Braddon – End Play
- Jon Cleary – Man's Estate
- Sumner Locke Elliott – The Man Who Got Away
- Catherine Gaskin – A Falcon for a Queen
- David Ireland – The Flesheaters
- Thomas Keneally – The Chant of Jimmie Blacksmith
- Peter Mathers – The Wort Papers

=== Short stories ===
- Peter Carey
  - "Crabs"
  - "Peeling"
- Frank Hardy – It's Moments Like These
- Elizabeth Jolley – "Dingle the Fool"
- Frank Moorhouse – The Americans, Baby

=== Children's and Young Adult fiction ===
- Hesba Brinsmead – Echo in the Wilderness
- Alan Marshall – Fight for Life
- Mary Elwyn Patchett – Rebel Brumby
- Ivan Southall – Head in the Clouds
- Eleanor Spence – The Nothing Place
- Patricia Wrightson – An Older Kind of Magic

=== Science fiction and fantasy ===
- A. Bertram Chandler – The Hard Way Up

=== Poetry ===
- Michael Dransfield
  - Drug Poems
  - The Inspector of Tides
- Harry Payne Heseltine – The Penguin Book of Australian Verse (edited)
- Les Murray – Poems Against Economics
- Peter Porter
  - After Martial
  - "Mort aux Chats"
  - Preaching to the Converted
- Thomas Shapcott – Begin With Walking
- Peter Skrzynecki – Head-Waters

=== Drama ===
- Dorothy Hewett – Bonbons and Roses for Dolly
- David Williamson – Jugglers Three

== Awards and honours ==
=== Literary ===
Award	Author	Title	Publisher
ALS Gold Medal	Alex Buzo	Macquarie : A Play	Currency Press
ALS Gold Medal	Alex Buzo	Tom	Angus and Robertson
Colin Roderick Award	Keith Hancock	Discovering Monaro	Cambridge University Press
Miles Franklin Award	Thea Astley	The Acolyte	Angus and Robertson

=== Children and Young Adult ===
Award	Category	Author	Title	Publisher
Children's Book of the Year Award	Older Readers	H. F. Brinsmead	Longtime Passing	Angus and Robertson
Children's Book of the Year Award	Picture Book	No award		

=== Science fiction and fantasy ===
Award	Category	Author	Title	Publisher
Australian SF Achievement Award	Best Australian Science Fiction	Lee Harding	"Fallen Spaceman"	If : Worlds of Science Fiction

=== Poetry ===
Award	Author	Title	Publisher
Grace Leven Prize for Poetry	Peter Skrzynecki	Head-Waters	Lyre Bird Writers

=== Drama ===
Award	Author	Title
AWGIE Award for Stage	David Williamson	The Removalists

== Births ==
A list, ordered by date of birth (and, if the date is either unspecified or repeated, ordered alphabetically by surname) of births in 1972 of Australian literary figures, authors of written works or literature-related individuals follows, including year of death.

- 11 August – Danielle Wood, journalist, writer and academic

Unknown date

- Louis Armand, poet and critic
- Steve Toltz, novelist
- Samuel Wagan Watson, poet

== Deaths ==
A list, ordered by date of death (and, if the date is either unspecified or repeated, ordered alphabetically by surname) of deaths in 1972 of Australian literary figures, authors of written works or literature-related individuals follows, including year of birth.

- 3 June – Martin Boyd, novelist (born 1893)
- 16 August – Dulcie Deamer, poet (born 1890)
- 16 October – Eunice Hanger, playwright and educator (born 1911)

== See also ==
- 1972 in Australia
- 1972 in literature
- 1972 in poetry
- List of years in Australian literature
- List of years in literature
