= 1972 in poetry =

Nationality words link to articles with information on the nation's poetry or literature (for instance, Irish or France).

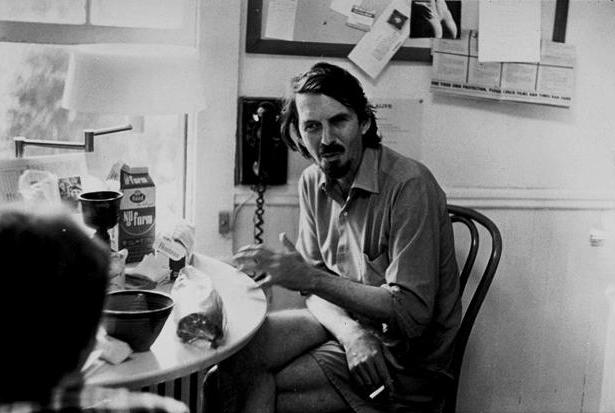
Poet Robert Creeley in 1972

== Events ==
- June 4 — Joseph Brodsky is expelled from the Soviet Union.
- May 22 — Cecil Day-Lewis, Poet Laureate of the United Kingdom, dies at Lemmons, the home of writers Kingsley Amis and Elizabeth Jane Howard on the northern edge of London.
- Autumn — The first threnody attributed to E. J. Thribb (actually written by Barry Fantoni and colleagues) is published in the English satirical magazine Private Eye.
- October 10 — Sir John Betjeman is appointed Poet Laureate of the United Kingdom.
- November — The American Poetry Review founded by Stephen Berg (poet) in Philadelphia, Pennsylvania.
- W. H. Auden, now a U.S. citizen, declares his New York neighborhood is too dangerous and returns to Oxford from the United States for the winter.
- The Belfast Group, a discussion group of poets in Northern Ireland, goes out of existence this year. The group was started by Philip Hobsbaum when he moved to Belfast in 1963 and which included Seamus Heaney, Michael Longley, James Simmons, Paul Muldoon, Ciaran Carson, Stewart Parker, Bernard MacLaverty and the critics Edna Longley and Michael Allen. Heaney moves from Belfast to work in Dublin and live in County Wicklow.
- James K. Baxter, one of New Zealand's best-known poets, writes two original poems on the wallpaper of a room in the home of painter Michael Illingworth and his wife Dene White. Soon after, Baxter dies. In 1973, after Baxter's death, the Illingworths remove the sections of wallpaper containing the poems and send them to the Hocken Library to be stored with Baxter's other papers.

== Works published in English ==
Listed by nation where the work was first published and again by the poet's native land, if different; substantially revised works listed separately:

=== Australia ===
- Anne Elder, For the Record
- A. D. Hope, Collected Poems : 1930-1970
- Harry Payne Heseltine, The Penguin Book of Australian Verse (edited)
- Les Murray, Poems Against Economics
- Peter Porter, "Mort aux Chats"
- Peter Skrzynecki, Head-Waters

=== Canada ===
- Earle Birney, Judith Copithorne, Andrew Suknaski, bill bissett, Four Parts Sand a selection of works by these concrete poets
- Leonard Cohen, The Energy of Slaves
- David Helwig, The Best Name of Silence
- George Johnston, Happy Enough: Poems 1935–1972.
- Dennis Lee, Civil Elegies and Other Poems. Toronto: Anansi.
- Kenneth Leslie, O'Malley to the Reds And Other Poems. Halifax: By the Author.
- Dorothy Livesay, Collected Poems: The Two Seasons. Toronto: Mcgraw-Hill Ryerson.
- Gwendolyn MacEwen:
  - * The Shadow-Maker. Toronto: Macmillan.
  - The Armies of the Moon. Toronto: Macmillan, 1972. ISBN 978-0-7705-0868-5
- Don McKay, Moccasins on Concrete: Poems (Canada)
- James Reaney, Poems.
- Charles Sangster, The St Lawrence and the Saguenay and other poems; Hesperus and other poems and lyrics, intro. Gordon Johnston (Toronto: University of Toronto Press and Buffalo, N.Y.)
- Raymond Souster, Selected Poems of Raymond Souster. Michael Maklem ed. Ottawa: Oberon Press.
- Wilfred Watson, The Sorrowful Canadians

=== India in English ===
- Meena Alexander, Without Place, Calcutta: Writers Workshop, India .
- Ruskin Bond, It isn't Time That's Passing: Poems, 1970–71, Calcutta: Writers Workshop, India .
- Margaret Chatterjee, The Sandalwood Tree, Calcutta: Writers Workshop, India
- Dilip Chitre, Ambulance Ride,
- Gauri Deshpande, Beyond the Slaughter House, Calcutta: Writers Workshop, India
- Shree Devi, Shades of Green, Calcutta: Writers Workshop, India
- Mary Vasanti Erulkar, Mandala 2/5, Calcutta: Writers Workshop, India
- Samir Das Gupta, Paling Shadows, Calcutta: Writers Workshop, India
- Nandita Haksar, Ego and Other Poems, Delhi: Orient Longman
- Gopal R. Honnalgere, A Gesture of Fleshless Sound, Calcutta: Writers Workshop, India .
- Dilip Kumar Roy, Hark! His Flute!, Poona: Hari Krishna Mandir
- Syed Ameerudin:
  - Poems of Protest, Sumter, South Carolina, United States: Poetry Eastwest; Indian poet, writing in English published in the United States
  - What the Himalayas said and Other Poems, Madras: Kalaivendhan Publishers
- Pritish Nandy, editor, Indian Poetry in English, anthology
- Saleem Peerandina (ed.), Contemporary Indian Poetry in English: An Assessment and Selection, Madras: Macmillan India Ltd.

=== Ireland ===
- Eiléan Ní Chuilleanáin, Acts and Monuments, Dublin: The Gallery Press
- Seamus Heaney, Wintering Out, Faber & Faber, Northern Ireland poet published in the United Kingdom
- Pearse Hutchinson, Watching the Morning Grow, including "Sometimes Feel", Gallery Press
- Thomas Kinsella, Notes from the Land of the Dead Irish poet published in the United Kingdom
- Derek Mahon, Lives. Oxford University Press, Northern Ireland poet published in the United Kingdom
- John Montague, The Rough Field
- W. R. Rodgers, Collected Poems, Northern Ireland poet, published in the United Kingdom; posthumous

=== New Zealand ===
- James K. Baxter:
  - Autumn Testament, not posthumous
  - Stonegut Sugar Works, Junkies and the Fuzz, Ode to Auckland, and Other Poems, posthumous
- Alistair Campbell, Kapiti : Selected Poems 1947-71. Christchurch: Pegasus Press
- Allen Curnow, Trees, Effigies, Moving Objects
- Bill Manhire, The Elaboration
- Kendrick Smithyman, Earthquake Weather

=== United Kingdom ===
- J. R. Ackerley (died 1967), Micheldever and Other Poems
- James Aitchison, Sounds Before Sleep
- Anne Beresford, Footsteps
- Martin Booth, The Crying Embers
- Alan Brownjohn, Warrior's Career
- Florence Bull, Saint David's Day
- Kevin Crossley-Holland, The Rain-Giver
- Douglas Dunn, The Happier Life
- D. J. Enright, Daughters of Earth
- Elaine Feinstien, At the Edge, Sceptre Press
- James Fenton, Terminal Moraine
- Seamus Heaney, Wintering Out, Faber & Faber, Northern Ireland native published in the United Kingdom
- Michael Horovitz, The Wolverhampton Wanderer
- Ted Hughes, Selected Poems 1957–1967 (see also Selected Poems 1982, New Selected Poems 1995)
- Thomas Kinsella, Notes from the Land of the Dead Irish poet published in the United Kingdom
- Liz Lochhead, Memo for Spring
- George MacBeth, Collected Poems 1958-70
- Derek Mahon, Lives. Oxford University Press, Northern Ireland native published in the United Kingdom
- Adrian Mitchell, Ride the Nightmare
- Edwin Morgan, Glasgow Sonnets
- Norman Nicholson, A Local Habitation
- Brian Patten, And Sometimes It Happens
- Mervyn Peake, A Book of Nonsense
- Peter Porter, Preaching to the Converted
- Sally Purcell, The Holly Queen
- Peter Redgrove, Dr Faust's Sea-Spiral Spirit, and Other Poems
- R. S. Thomas, H'm, Welsh
- Norman Nicholson, A Local Habitation
- Kathleen Raine, the Lost Country
- W. R. Rodgers, Collected Poems, Northern Ireland poet, published in the United Kingdom; posthumous
- Vernon Scannell, Selected Poems
- Peter Scupham, The Snowing Globe
- Stevie Smith, Scorpion, and Other Poems, posthumous
- Charles Tomlinson, Written on Water

==== Anthologies in the United Kingdom ====
- Helen Gardner, The New Oxford Book of English Verse, replaced the 1939 revised selection by Quiller-Couch. 1972
- John Heath-Stubbs, co-editor, Penguin Modern Poets 20

=== United States ===
- A.R. Ammons:
  - Briefings: Poems Small and Easy
  - Collected Poems: 1951–1971, winner of the National Book Award in 1973
- John Ashbery, Three Poems
- W. H. Auden, Epistle to a Godson
- Ted Berrigan, Ron Padgett, and Tom Clark, Back In Boston Again
- John Berryman, Delusions, Etc. (New York: Farrar, Straus & Giroux) posthumous
- Elizabeth Bishop and Emanuel Brasil, editors, An Anthology of Twentieth Century Brazilian Poetry (Wesleyan University Press)
- Harold Bloom, Yeats (criticism)
- Joseph Brodsky: Poems, Ann Arbor, Michigan: Ardis, Russian–American
- Gwendolyn Brooks, Aurora
- Robert Creeley, A Day Book
- Stephen Dobyns, Concurring Beasts
- Ed Dorn:
  - The Hamadryas Baboon at the Lincoln Park Zoo, Wine Press
  - Gunslinger, Book III: The Winterbook, Prologue to the Great Book IV Kornerstone, Frontier Press
- H.D. (Hilda Doolittle), Hermetic Definition
- Michael S. Harper, Song: "I want a Witness"
- LeRoi Jones as Amiri Baraka, Spirit Reach
- Philip Levine, They Feed They Lion
- Archibald MacLeish, The Human Season: Selected Poems, 1926–1972, selected poems
- James Merrill, Braving the Elements
- Ned O'Gorman, The Flag the Hawk Flies
- Mary Oliver, The River Styx, Ohio, and Other Poems
- George Oppen, Collected Poems (only in Great Britain) and Seascape: Needle's Eye
- Michael Palmer, Blake's Newton (Black Sparrow Press)
- Kenneth Rexroth:
  - 100 Poems from the French (translator)
  - Orchard Boat (translator)
- Theodore Roethke, Straw for Fire, posthumous selections made by David Wagoner from the poet's notebooks
- Louis Simpson, Adventures of the Letter I, including "American Dreams" and "Doubting"
- Patti Smith, Seventh Heaven
- James Tate, Absences
- Eleanor Ross Taylor, Welcome Eumenides
- Rosmarie Waldrop, The Aggressive Ways of the Casual Stranger (Random House)
- J. Rodolfo Wilcock (Argentine), La sinagoga degli iconoclasti, translated as The Temple of Iconoclasts

=== Other in English ===
- Wayne Brown, On the Coast, Caribbean
- Zulfikar Ghose, The Violent West, Pakistani poet lecturing in Texas
- Anthony McNeill, Reel from "The Life Movie", Jamaica
- James Matthews and Gladys Thomas, Cry Rage!, South Africa
- Wole Soyinka, A Shuttle in the Crypt, Nigeria

== Works published in other languages ==
Listed by nation where the work was first published and again by the poet's native land, if different; substantially revised works listed separately:

=== French language ===
==== Canada, in French ====
- Paul Chamberland, Éclats de la pierre noire d'oû rejaillit ma vie
- Gilles Hénault, complete works
- Gustave Lamarche, complete works
- Rina Lasnier, complete works
- Fernand Ouellette, complete works
- Suzanne Paradis, Il y eut un matin
- Jean-Guy Pilon, Silences pour une souveraine, Ottawa: Éditions de l'Université d'Ottawa
- Félix A. Savard, Le Bouscueil
- Gemma Tremblay, Souffles du midi
- Pierre Trottier, Sainte-Mémoire

==== France ====
- Marc Alyn, Infini au delà
- Philippe Chabaneix, Musiques d'avant la nuit
- Andrée Chedid, Visage premier
- Maurice Courant, Soleil de ma mémoire
- Micheline Dupray, L'Herbe est trop douce
- Gérard Genette, Figures III, one of three volumes of a work of critical scholarship in poetics – general theory of literary form and analysis of individual works — the Figures volumes are concerned with the problems of poetic discourse and narrative in Stendhal, Flaubert and Proust and in Baroque poetry (see also Figures I 1966, Figures II 1969)
- Eugène Guillevic, Encoches
- Edmond Jabès, Aély
- Pierre Loubière, Mémoire buisonnière
- Pierre Moussaric, Chansons du temps présent
- Marie Noël, Chants des quatre temps (posthumous)
- Hélène Parmelin, De Songe et de silence
- Saint-John Perse, Œuvres Complètes, Paris: Gallimard
- Denis Roche, Le Mécrit
- Claude Royet-Journoud, Le Renversement
- Claire de Soujeole, Pas dans la rosée

=== Germany ===
- Heinrich Böll, Gedichte, nine poems
- Andreas Okopenko, Orte wechselnden Unbehagens
- Reiner Kunze, Zimmerlautstärke
- Peter Huchel, Neue Gedichte
- Günter Kunert, Offenere Ausgang
- Beat Brechbühl, Der gechlagene Hund pisst an die Saüle des Tempels
- Heiner Bastian, Tod im Leben, a long poem

=== Hebrew ===
- Abraham Shlonsky, Ketavim
- David Fogel, Kol ha-Shirim, collected by Dan Pagis, edited by Y. Cohen
- E. Zussman, Atzai Tamid
- T. Ribner, Ain Lehashiv
- Yair Hurvitz, Narkisim le-Malhut Madmena
- Abba Kovner, Lahakat ha-Katzav

=== India ===
Listed in alphabetical order by first name:

- Chandranath Mishra, Unata pal, humorous and satirical poems by "a major poet of Maithili", according to Indian academic Sisir Kumar Das (a revised and expanded edition of Yugacakra 1952)
- Harumal Isardas Sadarangani, Piraha Ji Bakha, Sindhi-language
- Hiren Bhattacharya, Mor Des Mor Premar Kavita ("Poems of My Country and of My Love"), Assamese language
- Namdeo Dhasal, Golpitha; Marathi-language
- Niranjan Bhagat, Kavina Ketlak Prashno (Indian, writing in Gujarati), criticism
- Vasant Abaji Dahake, Yogabhrashta (translated into English by Ranjit Hoskote and Mangesh Kulkarni as A Terrorist of the Spirit;New Delhi: Harper Collins/Indus, 1992); Marathi-language
- Yumlembam Ibomcha Singh, Shingnaba Vol. I & II, Imphal; Meitei language

=== Italy ===
- Riccardo Bacchelli, La stella del mattino
- Marino Moretti, Tre anni e un giorno
- Aldo Palazzeschi, Via dalle cento stelle
- Tommaso Landolfi, Viola di morte, winner of the Fiuggi Prize
- Edoardo Sanguineti, Wirrwarr
- Giorgio Manganelli, Agli Dei ulteriori
- Ferdinando Camon, La vita eterna

=== Norway ===
- Hans Børli, Kyndelsmesse
- Per Arneberg, Oktobernetter
- Ernst Orvil, Nok sagt

=== Russia ===
- Konstantin Simonov, Vietnam. Summer 1970
- Aleksandr Bezymenski, The Law of the Heart, collected poems
- David Kugultinov, Kalmyk poet, Revolt of the Intellect

=== Spanish language ===
==== Spain ====
- Matilde Camus, Manantial de amor (Love Spring)
- Pedro Salinas, Poesía, selected by Julio Cortázar
- Ángel González, Palabra sobre palabra
- Saul Yukievich, Fundadores de la nueva poesía latinoamericana, a collection of studies published in Spain by an Argentine
- Darie Novaceanu and J.M. Caballero Bonald, translators and editors, Poesía rumana contemporánea, a bilingual edition of Romanian poems translated into Spanish.

==== Latin America ====
- Hugo Achugar, Con bigote triste
- Rosario Castellanos, Poesía no eres tú: Obra poética, 1948–1971
- Rafael Méndez Dorich, editor, Profundo Centro, an anthology (Lima), Peru
- Aída Vitale, Oidor andante
- Idea Vilariño, Poemas de amor

=== Yiddish ===
- Asya, Quiver of Boughs
- Beyle Schaechter-Gottesman, Footpaths Between Walls
- Ziame Telesin, Cries of Memory
- Rachel Boymvol, Longed For
- Zalman Shazar:
  - During a Mission
  - For Myself
- Rivka Basman Ben-Hayim, Bright Stones
- Malka Heifetz Tussman, Leaves Do Not Fall
- Rachel Korn, On the Edge of a Moment
- Joshua Rivin, Rainbow of Song
- Saul Maltz, With Joy and Song (for younger readers)

=== Other ===
- Jørgen Gustava Brandt, Upraktiske digte. Udvalg, selected poems from 1953 to 1971, Denmark
- Odysseus Elytis, The Light Tree And The Fourteenth Beauty (Το φωτόδεντρο και η δέκατη τέταρτη ομορφιά) and The Monogram (Το Μονόγραμμα) Greece
- Nizar Qabbani, Poems Against The Law, Syrian poet writing in Arabic
- Karl Ristikivi, Inimese teekond ("The journey of a man"), Estonian poet published in Sweden
- Wisława Szymborska: Wszelki wypadek ("Could Have"), Poland
- Johannes Wulff, Udvalgte digte. Vi som er hinanden, collected poems from 1928 to 1970, Denmark

== Awards and honors ==
- Nobel Prize in Literature: Heinrich Böll, West Germany

=== Australia ===
- Grace Leven Prize for Poetry: Peter Skrzynecki, Head-Waters

=== Canada ===
- See 1979 Governor General's Awards for a complete list of winners and finalists for those awards.

=== United Kingdom ===
- Cholmondeley Award: Molly Holden, Tom Raworth, Patricia Whittaker
- Eric Gregory Award: Tony Curtis, Richard Berengarten, Brian Oxley, Andrew Greig, Robin Lee, Paul Muldoon
- Keats Prize: Noël Welch

=== United States ===
- Pulitzer Prize for Poetry: James Wright, Collected Poems
- National Book Award for Poetry: Frank O'Hara, The Collected Works of Frank O'Hara
- Fellowship of the Academy of American Poets: W. D. Snodgrass

== Births ==
- March 1 – Rie Yasumi やすみ りえ pen name of Reiko Yasumi 休 理英子, Japanese Senryū poet (a woman)
- April 16 – Tracy K. Smith, African American poet, United States Poet Laureate
- April 24 – Sinéad Morrissey, Northern Irish poet
- June 28 – Geeta Tripathee, Nepali poet, lyricist and literary critic
- August 18 – Adda Djørup, Danish poet and fiction writer (a woman)
- Shimon Adaf, Israeli poet and author
- Alissa Quart, American nonfiction writer, critic, journalist, editor and poet

== Deaths ==
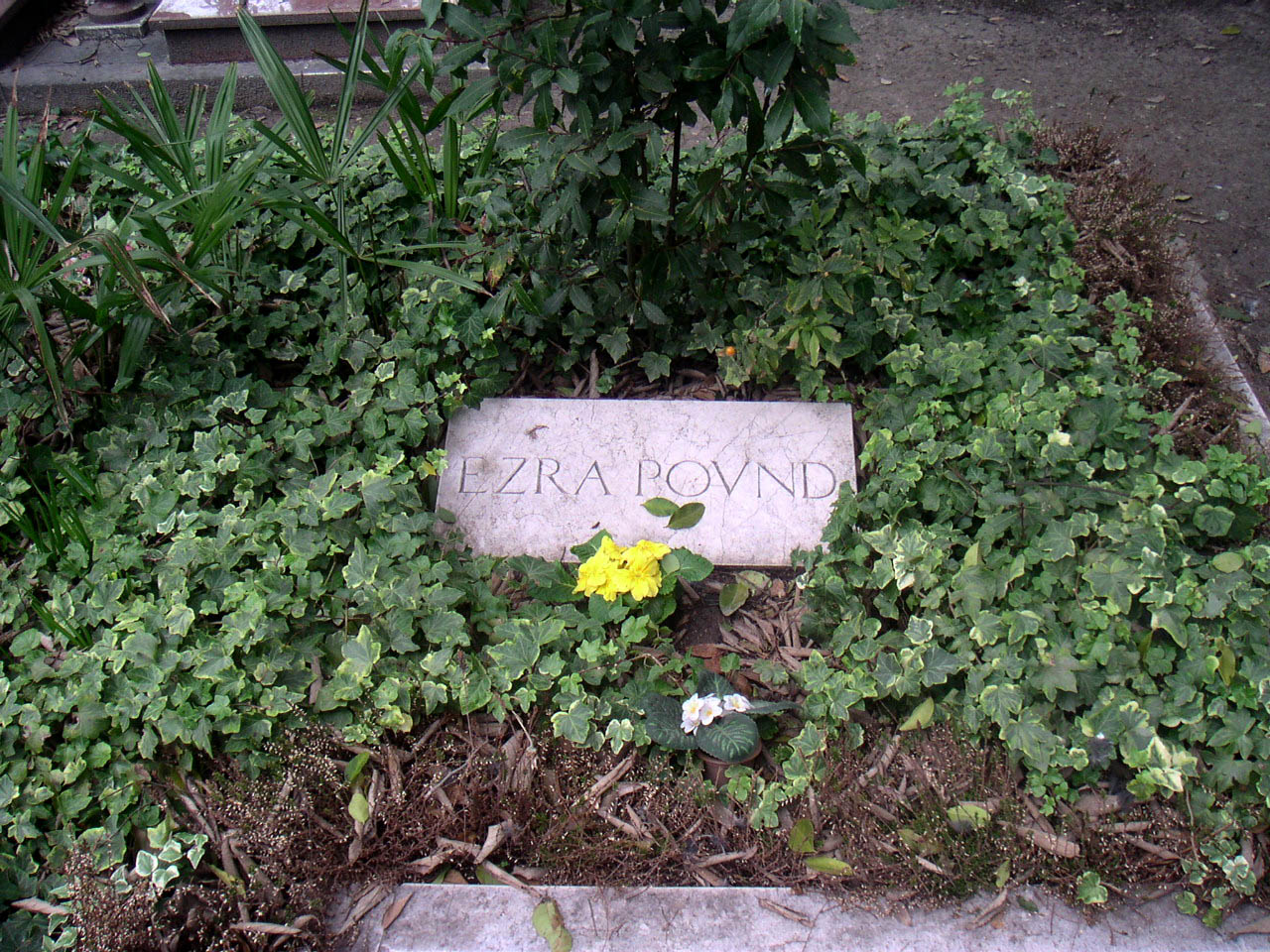
Grave of Ezra Pound

Birth years link to the corresponding "[year] in poetry" article:

- January 1 – Eberhard Wolfgang Möller, 65 (born 1906), German playwright and poet
- January 7 – John Berryman, 57 (born 1914), American poet, from suicide by jumping off a bridge into the Mississippi River
- January 8 – Kenneth Patchen, 60 (born 1911), American poet and painter, of a heart attack
- January 11 – Padraic Colum, 90, Irish–American poet
- February 5 – Marianne Moore, 84 (born 1887), American Modernist poet and writer
- March 4 – Richard Church (poet), 78, English poet, critic and novelist
- May 22 – Cecil Day-Lewis, 68 English poet
- c June – Winifred Mary Letts (born 1882), English writer
- August 2 – Paul Goodman (born 1911), American poet, of a heart attack
- August 21 – A.M. Klein, 61, Ukrainian-Canadian poet and writer
- August 24 – Venkatarama Ramalingam Pillai, 83 (born 1888), Indian Tamil-language poet and freedom fighter
- September 25 – Alejandra Pizarnik, 36 (born 1936), Argentinian poet, suicide by overdose
- October 3 – Gladys Schmitt, 63 (born 1909), American poet
- October 22 – James K. Baxter, 46, New Zealand poet
- November 1 – Ezra Pound, 87 (born 1885), American poet, critic and the driving force behind several Modernist movements, notably Imagism and Vorticism, from an intestinal blockage
- November 20 – Robert Fletcher (poet), 87, American "cowboy poet" of "Don't Fence Me In"
- December 10
  - Eileen Duggan, 78, New Zealand poet and journalist
  - Mark Van Doren, 78, American poet, academic and critic
- December 20 – Günter Eich (born 1907) German poet, dramatist and author

== See also ==
- Poetry
- List of poetry awards
- List of years in poetry
