= A Descant for Gossips =

A Descant for Gossips may refer to:

- A Descant for Gossips (miniseries)
- A Descant for Gossips (novel)
