= Acolyte (disambiguation) =

An acolyte, in its original religious definition, is one who assists a higher-ranking member of a church or cult.

Acolyte, The Acolyte, Acolytes, or The Acolytes may also refer to:

- Acolytes (comics), a Marvel Comics team of mutant supervillains
- Acolytes (film), a 2008 Australian horror film directed by Jon Hewitt
- Acolyte (album), the 2010 debut album by UK band Delphic
- The Acolyte (novel), a 1972 novel by Australian author Thea Astley
- The Acolyte (fanzine), a 1940s science fiction fanzine edited by Francis Towner Laney
- The Acolyte (TV series), a 2024 Star Wars television series
  - "The Acolyte" (The Acolyte episode), an episode of The Acolyte
- Acolytes Protection Agency, a pro-wrestling tag team sometimes referred to as simply The Acolytes
- Acolyte, a type of character in the book series Pendragon: Journal of an Adventure Through Time and Space
