= Beachmaster =

Beachmaster or beach master may refer to:

- A military officer in charge of the disembarkation phase of amphibious warfare
- One of two US Navy amphibious beach party units:
  - Beachmaster Unit One, based in Coronado, California
  - Beachmaster Unit Two, based in Little Creek, Virginia
- A dominant male of some pinniped species, most often an elephant seal

In literature:

- Beachmasters, a 1985 novel by Australian author Thea Astley
- "Beachmaster", a 2009 poem by Clive James
