= An Item from the Late News =

1982 novel by Thea Astley

- First edition
- Author: Thea Astley
- Language: English
- Publisher: University of Queensland Press, Australia
- Publication date: 1982
- Publication place: Australia
- Media type: Print (Hardback and Paperback)
- Pages: 200
- ISBN: 0702217026
- Preceded by: A Kindness Cup
- Followed by: Beachmasters

An Item from the Late News (1982) is a novel by Australian author Thea Astley.

== Plot summary ==
Kirkusreviews.com summarises the plot as follows:

"The narrator here is arch, sarcastic, oblique Gabby, a painter who, in reaction against her boring upper-middle[-class grazier] family, has been through marriage, affairs, bohemianism, and a breakdown. ... Now, back in her home-town of Allbut, a former mining center that's become a near-ghost town ""in our continental funkerama,"" Gabby is oddly entranced by a newcomer named Wafer--an over-age hippie whose only goal is to find ""the perfect bomb shelter."" (His father was a WW II bomb fatality; he's obsessed with Hiroshima.) But Wafer's quiet quest on the town's outskirts will be doomed--by the town's greed and hypocrisy and violence, and by Gabby's own self-involved apathy: Wafer is terrorized by a local macho-thug; his fatherly affection for a teenage girl (the thug's rape victim) is used against him. And when Wafer happens to find a precious stone on one of his wanderings, the town will stop at nothing to learn the location of this possible new gem-lode. . . with a predictably fatal outcome."

== Themes ==
- Differences between Australian cultural "bush hero" myths and some kinds of "reality".
- A sub-culture of Australian male violence and abuses, including some impacts of heavy alcohol consumption.
- Characteristic aspects of life (and climate / environment) in rural-remote towns in the outback, in Queensland and Australia.
- Abusive treatment of Aboriginal people.
- Relative invisibility and "voicelessness" of women up until the 1980s.
- Changing culture of that time, due to the impacts of television, global events including the threat of nuclear war, and the inroads of "hippies" and other "blow-ins".
- Australian culture and lifestyle positioned against that of other places.
- The nature of "failure" in life - as exhibited by individual "selves" (especially Gabby herself) as well as by more externalising characters (Colley, Moon, Wafer) - and in systems, especially embodied by Sergeant Cropper representing the police force ("law") and Councillor Brim representing normalcy and "order".
- Philosophic considerations of identity and meaning.

In this novel from the early 1980s, Astley highlights the varied reactions of provincial small town folk toward diverse "in-migrants", in the form of "hippies" (Wafer), ex-army escapees (Moon), and downwardly mobile persons (Colley). Astley engages strongly, as is often her way, with themes of Australian male violence, and less savoury aspects of the character of life in a small fictional remote outback town ("Allbut"). She exposes the transparent personalities of the townsfolk - through the lens of observer Gabby's semi-omniscient narrative - and a "secret" side to their culture, one that celebrates even extreme violence and tends to rally around and protect the perpetrators, at the expense of more vulnerable characters.

== Analysis ==
Author Toni Jordan found that Astley had a predisposition to "convoluted...obtuse" writing, while others noted dense wordy descriptions and long, list-like sentences, and the second-half gripped by extreme violences and "grotesque brutality". This is nevertheless a worthwhile novel and would have been very relevant, even avant-garde in challenging the status quo, at the time when it was first published. It is not a suitable title for younger readers, due to the very extreme nature of some of the violence Astley portrays, and also has a philosophical complexity to it, due to its "relentless integrity", pessimism and parallel with the New Testament Christ story, combined with what Geoffrey Dutton termed "the Great Australian Awfulness".

As the bored would-be artist (narrator) Gabby finds herself drawn to newcomer Wafer despite his "impregnable self-sufficiency", her reflections provide a means by which introspective readers are able to review their own personal life experience and to step inside even such an extreme story as this, as if they could be present, thus heightening the sense of reality.

Astley also peppers her writing with musical, cultural and religious allusions. These could appear incongruous within the Australian context, but for the positioning of Gabby's, Wafer's and Moon's earlier globe-trotting travels contributing to their present characterisations, and the relevance of world events in ringing in the changes that are associated with these "different" characters, who have moved into (or back to) the small town.

Paul Genoni highlights Astley's use of the word "nothing" to invoke a "nothing(ness)" that is part of "the colonial and postcolonial experience of Australian space ... [and] deeply embedded in the Australian imaginary ... grounded in the [Britishers' perceived] void at the heart of the continent", that is, in the outback. Like the character Wafer, who dreamt of a bomb shelter and safe haven in a remote place with wide horizons, many historic explorers of the "new" continent of Australia had dreamed and set out "in search of something" sustaining, but were - sometimes fatally - disappointed.

== Reviews ==
- Kirkus Reviews: "As in her previous work, Astley is romanticizing the misfit/outcast here--especially when she drops allusions along the way that suggest Wafer/Christ parallels. And Gabby's narration, though dotted with sparks of rough poetry and sardonic comedy, is too often self-consciously slangy or artsy. Still, adventurous readers may want to tackle this dense socio-philosophical fable--for its undeniable intensity, for the moments when Astley's lashing prose is controlled enough to produce grimly atmospheric or bitterly humorous effects."
- Marian Eldridge in The Canberra Times: "All in all, though, 'An Item From the Late News' works only too well. It is not a pretty story, not an optimistic one, but in today's world horribly pertinent, and always readable."

== Awards ==
- 1982 The Age Book of the Year Awards – Fiction (or Imaginative Writing) Award, shortlisted

== See also ==
- 1982 in Australian literature
