= The Slow Natives =

1965 novel by Thea Astley

- First edition
- Author: Thea Astley
- Language: English
- Publisher: Angus and Robertson
- Publication date: 1965
- Publication place: Australia
- Media type: Print (Hardback & Paperback)
- Pages: 210
- Preceded by: The Well Dressed Explorer
- Followed by: A Boat Load of Home Folk

The Slow Natives (1965) is a Miles Franklin Award-winning novel by Australian author Thea Astley.

It won the Miles Franklin Award in 1965, the second of her record number of four wins.

== Plot summary ==
Set in sub-tropical Queensland, the novel examines the relationships between suburban Brisbanites including a priest, nuns and a couple and their teenage son.

== Style and themes ==
The novel represents a departure for Astley from her earlier novels in that rather than focusing on one or two particular characters, she moves "freely among a group, switching attention omnisciently from one to another. Almost all the characters suffer from some form of spiritual aridity; in Astley's vision, there often seems nothing between repression, and empty or even corrupt sexuality".

Astley's characters in this novel often only realise their failings after disaster has beset them. The father, for example, only realises after his teenage son has lost his leg in a "joy-riding accident", that he has "failed to give his son 'the sort of discipline ... [he] wanted more than anything in the world'."

== Critical reception ==
Ruth Lesley, in The Canberra Times noted: "She works on two levels, that of the everyday world of meals, work, parties and squabbles, which she describes with wit and penetration, and that of the lonely inner world of each of her characters. There is very little action as such, but her analysis of the characters and the subtleties of their relationships makes very interesting reading."

== Awards ==
- Miles Franklin Award, 1965
- Melbourne Mooma Festival Award, 1965

== See also ==
- 1965 in Australian literature

== Notes ==
- Middlemiss.org
- Taylor, Cheryl and Perkins, Elizabeth (2007) "Warm words: North Queensland writing" in Patrick Buckridge and Elizabeth McKay (ed.) By the Book: A Literary History of Queensland, St Lucia, University of Queensland Press
