= Reaching Tin River =

Book by Thea Astley

- First edition
- Author: Thea Astley
- Language: English
- Publisher: William Heinemann, Australia
- Publication date: 1990
- Publication place: Australia
- Media type: Print (hardback & paperback)
- Pages: 223
- ISBN: 0399135324
- Preceded by: It's Raining in Mango
- Followed by: Vanishing Points

Reaching Tin River (1990) is a novel by Australian author Thea Astley. It won the Christina Stead Prize for Fiction in 1990, which is part of the New South Wales Premier's Literary Awards.

== Plot summary ==
This novel by Thea Astley is about a young woman, Belle, who is "thirty-something". She is portrayed as witty, determined and resourceful despite having grown up in a kind of limbo between a rural-remote farm in Queensland owned by her grandparents, and boarding school. However she exhibits a touch of shyness and unworldliness, and lacks the emotional grounding and feeling of a "centre" that she would have if not for her drummer mother Bonnie being often absent, playing in a band with Aunt Marie, and her American father being a complete unknown (except for the snapshot quality of information derived from Bonnie's memories, and a brief meeting with him late in the novel).

The story is narrated from Belle's own perspective, and explores the various settings in which she finds herself as she searches unsuccessfully for an emotional centre, which she hopes to discover in the form of a series of persons, mainly her mother and her head librarian husband Seb. Through her inability to find any satisfaction, Belle gradually descends, while traversing the events of her "uncentred" and introspective young adult life journey - being by turns attached to/defensive of and critical of her eccentric mother, and increasingly detached from and sarcastically disposed towards her husband - into a mounting obsession with a historic and "long-dead archetypal settler", the pioneer character named Gaden Lockyer. As her obsession develops into something approaching a mildly florid insanity (maybe a touch of OCD?), she separates from Seb, and undertakes a "research project" about Lockyer. This leads her to travel in rural Queensland, visiting towns and localities where Lockyer lived. Her intention is ultimately to meld herself so completely with him emotionally and psychically that it becomes possible for her to manifest herself in a tangible way in the times and places where he was alive, in order to be with him.

This of course creates a substantial tension, because Belle realises at the same time that it is not possible.

As her own main character in the narration, Belle portrays herself as wavering on being "quick-witted, strong willed, rebellious and ambitious ... tell[ing] an ironic story of her childhood and her obsession with [the] dead man."

Summarising for Text Publishing's 2018 re-edition of the novel, Jennifer Down states that Belle, while occupied conducting archival research for her library work, discovered the colonial character of Gaden Lockyer (a fictional pioneer, apparently invented by Astley), due to his one-time location in Jericho Flats (a town with relevance to her childhood). Down observes that, after becoming obsessed, "Belle’s quest for Lockyer is her way of coming to terms with the past—her mother, ‘a drummer in her own all-women’s group’; her absent American father; and her ineffectual husband, Seb." In her review of the novel in Kill Your Darlings, Down perceives readers as "captive bystanders" to Belle's "inward-focused, often questionably reliable, [and] occasionally scattered" personality and journey, in a novel that encapsulates several expertly conjured characters, that are "all ... flawed and deeply human".

The settings of the novel's events allow Astley to incorporate social commentary about phases of Australian history, much as she does in her preceding novel It's Raining in Mango. This is particularly the case with regard to the change in women's accepted roles, ranging from the colonial context to the contemporary modern and post-modern culture of the 1980s.

== Author's notes ==
Commenting on a scene in the book where Belle visits a country boarding house where Lockyer stayed, Astley stated: "About two or three years ago when I was passing an old seaside boarding house, the sort of place I've stayed at in country towns over and over again," she said, "and I thought I'd like to walk into that awful looking boarding house. If there was no-one around I'd sit there and wait. If anyone asked I'd say I was waiting for X, you know. If they hadn't sent for the police by evening I'd still be sitting there and saying I'm waiting for X. Eventually some absolutely ghastly person would come down the stairs and say, "I'm X." And then I thought, "This is wrong. It sounds like a thriller, you know, not my scene," but that's what started it off."

== Reviews ==
- Ursula Perrin in The New York Times: "Every novel has a secret heart. It may be a faint heart, a bum heart, a cold heart. Ms. Astley's novel has a case of atrial fibrillation: its heart beats strongly but erratically. Much of the early writing is inflated, contorted; the ending seems to me a sham. And yet there's the journey, ah, the journey."
- Sandy Forbes in The Canberra Times: "Astley's prose crackles with wit and acerbic observation. Her outback towns seem to leach the pages; her observations about the upwardly mobile townies are just as dry."
- In Kill Your Darlings, Jennifer Down regards the novel as displaying a "richness of its world,...warmth of its characters and...joyfulness of its writing". Her summary for Text states that "In Reaching Tin River, Thea Astley’s satire is at its sharpest and most entertaining."
- Debra Adelaide, reviewing Karen Lamb's work Thea Astley: Inventing Her Own Weather, notes: "It tells us a great deal that Astley could attack sexism so persistently in her fiction yet would hesitate to call herself a feminist. She could nail the limitations of marriage and domesticity for women in one sly, succinct phrase (Belle, in Reaching Tin River: "he took up what I can only call 'men's cooking' — the infinite search for the perfect sauce") yet some of her cruellest portraits are of women and girls."
- 'Whispering Gums', in the Australian Women's Writers Challenge of May 2021, comments that, "Another treasured Australian writer ... is Thea Astley. Nancy reviewed her Reaching Tin River. Unfortunately, although Nancy loves Astley, she didn’t love this novel. Overall, she writes, “Ms Astley’s first novels were dazzling….filled with autobiographical tidbits and a dense almost poetic style” but she felt that Astley may have felt too pressured to keep producing books and didn’t manage to pull it off with this one."

== Awards ==
- 1990 New South Wales Premier's Literary Awards — Christina Stead Prize for Fiction, winner
- 1991 Miles Franklin Award, shortlisted

== See also ==
- 1990 in Australian literature
- Middlemiss.org
