= Beachmasters =

Book by Thea Astley

- First edition
- Author: Thea Astley
- Language: English
- Publisher: Penguin, Australia
- Publication date: 1985
- Publication place: Australia
- Media type: Print (Paperback)
- Pages: 185
- ISBN: 0140079122
- Preceded by: An Item from the Late News
- Followed by: Reaching Tin River

Beachmasters (1985) is a novel by Australian author Thea Astley. It won the 1986 ALS Gold Medal.

== Plot summary ==
The novel is set on the small Melanesian island of Kristi in the far-western Pacific. A band of discontented Kristians and sympathetic colonials launch a revolution against the island government, which is composed of both French and British officials. While no single character predominates, it is the dilemma of Gavi Salway trapped between ties of blood and tradition and forced to decide whether to aid or betray the revolution's leader that affects us most.

== Author's notes ==
"Astley almost disclaims the expectation that 'Beachmasters' might raise its readers' eyes — if not as far as the South Pacific, then at least to racial problems closer to home: 'You know, one does, but...

"'Writing's a funny business. You're just affected by a situation or an instant, and you've got to put it down. You know, if you're Robert Ludlum, maybe you'd affect millions. It's so hit-and-miss. Books die within six months, don't they? Unless you've written 'War and Peace'."'

== Reviews ==
- Laurence Hill in Library Journal: "The Third World setting and politics evoke comparison to the work of V.S. Naipaul and Graham Greene. While Astley does not quite attain their high level of achievement, she has produced a work of considerable power and distinction."
- Publishers Weekly: "The result is a fragmented narrative, held together by the poetry of Astley's writing, which is often haunting but occasionally overly ponderous."

== See also ==
- 1985 in Australian literature
- Middlemiss.org
