= A Kindness Cup =

Book by Thea Astley

- First edition
- Author: Thea Astley
- Language: English
- Publisher: Nelson Books, Australia
- Publication date: 1974
- Publication place: Australia
- Media type: Print (Paperback)
- Pages: 154
- ISBN: 0170050157
- Preceded by: The Acolyte
- Followed by: An Item from the Late News

A Kindness Cup (1974) is a novel by Australian author Thea Astley. It won the 1975 The Age Book of the Year Award.

== Plot summary ==
The novel is set in a cane-country town, equating to a historic rendition of Mackay, on the north Queensland coast, in an area first settled by Europeans in the early 1860s. It deals with a wave of racist brutality by settlers and native police towards local Aboriginal people in the late 1860s, and with the attempts by some community members, twenty years later, to rectify the wrongs caused.

The story opens with retired schoolteacher Tom Dorahy, who is invited to return to the town after an absence of many years, for anniversary celebrations known as "Back to The Taws week". Unfolding chapters firstly follow Dorahy back into his teaching days in the 1860s, serving to introduce several of his (all male) students, Tim Jenner, Fred Buckmaster and Barney Sweetman, "the privileged sons of wealthy landholders and frontiersmen".

Various community members from the 1860s are then introduced by turns, such as the violent and militaristic Lieutenant Buckmaster senior, who is presented in stark contrast to a struggling, isolated but compassionate farmer Charles Lunt, a young and charismatic singer named Gracie Tilburn, and the town newspaper printer "Snoggers" Boyd, who tends to yield to the views of others. These descriptions of personalities and their contexts and interactions are interspersed with fictionalised "excerpts" of a court hearing, by which Buckmaster gets away with his crimes, based in part on the actual report of the Select Committee on the Native Police Force, Queensland 1861.

Against this "backdrop", a young local Aboriginal woman, Kowaha, emerges, having just had a baby recently. Her people were camped along a creek on Lunt's property. As Dorahy's memories are juxtaposed with awkward "present day" experiences of the town and its folk twenty years later, it becomes clear that both Dorahy and Lunt were sympathetic to and supportive of the local Aboriginal people during the 1860s, when other male townsfolk, led by Buckmaster, instead pursued them in retribution for killing cattle, and shot them, in order to "disperse" them. As the plot unfolds, Lunt experiences extreme violence at the hands of the town's main vigilantes (Buckmaster and Sweetman senior), who leave him for dead. Then, not only are a number of the Aboriginal men "massacred" by the settlers in conjunction with native police, but also Kowaha, clutching her baby, feels compelled to jump to her death from a local mountain cliff-top, at an Aboriginal sacred site. Kowaha dies but her baby miraculously survives. Lunt is forced to leave the town. The baby, Mary, is raised by the Boyds, then the Jenners, and finally goes to live with Lunt in order to care for him in his older age.

Dorahy, now sixty odd, having returned for "Back to the Taws week", remains incensed by the events of history, which are kept quiet by the politically (and personally) motivated Buckmasters and Sweetmans, who were involved in the murders and beatings. Dorahy has become a "fanatic" for truth-telling. He convinces Boyd to take him in his buggy to go fetch Lunt - a first-hand witness - in order to bring him back to the town for the celebrations, with the intention of openly revealing the hidden violence of the past to the town in general. However Lunt refuses to talk about it, just as he has always done. After Dorahy urges Boyd at last to support him in a vocal way by writing an article about it in the paper, Boyd is betrayed by an employee and his news office is burnt down by Buckmaster. Boyd then persuades Gracie Tilburn to introduce him to speak at a final-night town gathering, and, without naming specific perpetrators, he reveals the full story to the entire town. The next generation Buckmaster and Sweetman, and supporters, then enact violence on Lunt, inadvertently killing him and rendering him a "martyr". The story culminates with them viciously assaulting both Dorahy and Boyd.

== Themes ==
- Colonial violence against Aboriginal people and those who supported them: Ahead of her time in 1974, this is a fictionalised presentation of colonial violence against, and displacement and massacre of Aboriginal peoples, by racist settlers, officers and native police. The resulting poverty of surviving Aboriginal people is described. Some of the implications that this brutal level of violence likely also had for those who supported Aboriginal peoples are explored. The ineffectiveness of legal redress at that time for the crimes committed is highlighted.
- The settlement history of Queensland: The "history" presented calls to mind the bloody and genocidal unfolding of the approaches taken, both official and non-official, to ensuring successful settlement and the establishment of numerous actual Queensland (and Australian) towns in the 19th century. Astley also describes some of the types of hardships and challenges experienced by settlers and townspeople.
- Observing and challenging complicity: In this novel, Astley engages in querying the tendency of many people - albeit often unintentional - to follow along with perpetrators of violence, and to become complicit in both covering up the crimes (especially historic crimes) and maintaining their own ignorance of the facts. In the closing chapter, Astley describes the crowd of townsfolk as a "mindless animal", and observes that "People can drown in shallows". She notes the incongruence of the town's sense of unity and nostalgia, given its historic and "present" violences, by using reference to the song "Auld Lang Syne", hence the title "A Kindness Cup".
- Effects of ageing and "loss" of the past: The descriptions of characters in the story as a whole - in frank Astley style - offer a somewhat introspective exploration of the impacts of ageing and the sense of time being lost to the past.
- Historic and literary allegory: Also typical of Astley is the use of references to numerous historic and literary figures, with allegorical meaning of relevance to the events in the story.

== Reviews ==
Malcolm Pettigrove in The Canberra Times was not overly impressed with the book, stating: "When Miss Astley (sic.) drops the prose of the stylist and begins to function simply as a writer with a tale to tell her work becomes stark, tense, and most effectively dramatic."

Kate Grenville reread the book in 2018, upon it being reissued. She called Astley "ahead of her time" and said that "Thirty years beforehand she had known what some of us were only just waking up to: that our own history provides a powerful engine for fiction, and that the voice of fiction can say the unspoken about that history."

Lou Holloway commented on what may be apparent to a 2020s reader, that is, the lack of in-depth characterisation of Aboriginal people who appear in the novel, which is dominated by the observations and perspectives of white characters, whose race goes "unremarked". Also, the filled-out characters, he notes, are almost all male.

Jessica Gildersleeve in 2019 drew a parallel between American writings about the "deep south" and Astley's novels about Australia's "deep north", and emphasised Astley's valuing "of interpersonal engagement and social responsibility".

Steve Walker, of Stuff wrote "Astley's work is characterised by her irony and her unflinching scrutiny of social injustice. In A Kindness Cup, she was at the top of her impressive form."

== See also ==
- 1974 in Australian literature
