= A Descant for Gossips (miniseries) =

1983 Australian TV mini series

- Genre: drama
- Based on: A Descant for Gossips by Thea Astley
- Written by: Ted Roberts; Robert Stead
- Directed by: Tim Burstall
- Starring: Kaarin Fairfax; Geneviève Picot; Peter Carroll
- Country of origin: Australia
- Original language: English
- No. of episodes: 3

Production
- Producer: Erina Rayner
- Running time: 60 minutes

Original release
- Network: ABC
- Release: 25 September 1983

A Descant for Gossips is a 1983 Australian miniseries about a school girl who becomes involved with two teachers. The adaptation is based on the novel of the same name by Australian author Thea Astley.

== Cast ==
- Kaarin Fairfax as Vinny Lalor
- Geneviève Picot as Helen Striebel
- Peter Carroll as Robert Moller
- Louise Kan as Pearl
- Desiree Smith as Betty
- Steve Bastoni as Howard
- Keir Saltmarsh as Tommy
- Simon Chilvers as Mr. Findlay
- Anne Phelan as Mrs. Lalor
- Rona McLeod as Lillian
- Jennifer Jarman-Walker as Jess Talbot
- Rod Densley as Alex Talbot
- Kate Jason as Ruth Lunbeck
- Jeffrey Hodgson as Harold Lunbeck
- Jillian Murray as Marion Welch
- Bill Garner as Sam
- Rod Williams as Mr. Lalor
- Bruce Knappett as Mr. Jordan
- Les James as Mr. Farrelly
- Anne Charleston as Margaret
- Con Mathios as Royce
- Greg Stroud as Mike
- Peter Hosking as Barman

== Synopsis ==
Lonely teen Vinny Lalor lives in a small rural Queensland town in the 1950s. Her parents have separated and she is neglected by her family and struggles to fit in socially at school. Her life takes a turn when she finds a genuine friend and maternal influence in her schoolteacher, Helen Striebel.

Helen begins a discreet romantic relationship with English teacher Robert Moller, despite the fact that he is married to a disabled wife who is terminally ill. Their relationship becomes a source of scandal, as rumours begin to spread through town. The school principal intervenes, pressuring Vinny into betraying Helen, which ultimately sees Helen ejected from the town.

Vinny, feeling isolated, begins socialising with a group of delinquent local boys, one of whom she exchanges a kiss with. This sees her subjected to ridicule and humiliation by her classmates. Upset by their cruelty and mourning the loss of her friendship with Helen, Vinny takes rat poison in an attempt to end her life.

== Production ==
Film rights to the novel were sold in 1968.

The miniseries was filmed in Romsey, Victoria, rather than in the Queensland locations associated with the novel's setting.

It was the first lead role for Fairfax, who had been in I Can Jump Puddles and Starstruck.

== Broadcast ==
The series began airing on the ABC in 1983, with the first of three episodes broadcast on 25 September 1983. It was repeated in 1984.

== Reception ==
The Sydney Sun Herald said the series "will have even the most unblinking insomniac snoring after the first 20 minutes - yet it has some good things going for it."

The Age said "the program's strength lies in the controlled acting of Peter Carroll... and Genevieve Picot, and the inventive, quiet direction of Tim Burstall."
