= A Boat Load of Home Folk =

Book by Thea Astley

- First edition
- Author: Thea Astley
- Language: English
- Genre: Fiction
- Publisher: Angus and Robertson
- Publication date: 1968
- Publication place: Australia
- Media type: Print
- Pages: 218pp
- Preceded by: The Slow Natives
- Followed by: The Acolyte

A Boat Load of Home Folk (1968) is a novel by Australian author Thea Astley.

== Plot summary ==
=== Introduction ===
A Boat Load of Home Folk follows a group of passengers on a cruise ship, the Malekula, docked at a Pacific Island port as a hurricane approaches.

The narration of the novel focuses on the troubles of the small group of boat passengers – some on holiday, others travelling for work – and characters they cross paths with in the small community of a Pacific Island port, fictitiously designated “Port Lena”. The island is inhabited by dark-skinned “natives” and by white settlers, of Australian and English extraction. It features picturesque bays, dense tropical palm forests, an active volcano named “Mount Tongoa”, and a small town and outlying mission and mine settlements.

Against a postcard-like tropical setting and severe heat, the narrative examines the personal difficulties and character flaws of the principal figures. These developments lead to interconnected personal crises that coincide with the arrival of a destructive tropical cyclone.

=== Characters ===
Those on board the boat are:

- Mr Gerald Seabrook, age 50, and his 40 year old wife Kathleen, on holiday,
- Miss Verna Paradise, age 62, and 60 year old friend Miss Kitty Trumper, holidaying,
- James Stevenson, an Irish expatriate public servant and government agent, returning from a job elsewhere,
- a priest Father Greely, who has been sent from Australia to deal with the problem of another priest’s (Father Lake's) inappropriate behaviour toward a native teenage boy on the island,
- the Dutch-origin ship’s captain, Captain Brinkman,
- and some few “native boys” who work on board.

Characters from the island include:

- Locally-stationed priests Father Vincent Lake and Father Terry Mulgrave,
- Local Bishop Deladier,
- Local native boys, especially John Terope,
- Holly Stevenson (wife of James), and children, especially their young son Timmy; they live between Australia and the island,
- Miss Marie Latimer, girlfriend/mistress of James (and local resident),
- Marie’s friend Daphne Woodsall, and Daph’s husband Bobby Woodsall (locals),
- Mr Leslie Tucker-Brown and his wife Sylvia (locals),
- Mr Fricotte, of the hotel, and others.

Extra characters include:

- Mr Whybrow, a private investigator, who Kathleen used to confirm Gerald's indiscretions.

=== Plot ===
Alighting from the Malekula, Gerald Seabrook and Kathleen are bored with one another, largely due to his frequent unfaithfulness. They are seen constantly trying to keep their bickering and arguing under wraps, until eventually Kathleen declares that she wants a divorce. She is drawn to James Stevenson, who it seems might save her, while Gerald, for his part, continues frequently prospecting for another woman, that he might be able to have a fling with.

Meanwhile Miss Paradise is critical, becoming intolerant of her doddering friend Miss Trumper, and insulting her roundly. This leads to Kitty heading off to walk up to the volcano crater alone in the heat of the tropical day. Verna gets herself "shickered" in the Lantana pub, where she encounters Father Lake, also drowning his sorrows. Kitty however is robbed by a young native boy, suffers a profound shock, and ultimately dies in tragic circumstances.

James Stevenson is faced with a cataclysmic life moment, with a sudden exacerbation in his health problems occurring, while his marriage to Holly is breaking down due to his overwhelming infatuation with a recent mistress, Marie. He wonders if he will die.

Father Greely, struggling in his priestly garments in the oppressive heat, is confronted by the unrepentant and ironically jocular Father Lake. Rather than being ecclesiastically reprimanded - for being caught attempting to initiate sex with a young teenage boy, John Terope - Lake wants to leave the priesthood altogether. This is an unpopular idea, and is not supported by his fellow priests or bishop.

As the cyclone approaches and the howling torment of the winds, and deluge of rain and storm surge waves destroys the village, the characters must confront the unsatisfactory realities of their life problems.

=== Analysis ===
The style of the novel is visually descriptive, with bursts of tropical-coloured scenery and a visceral sense of the impactful heat and humidity. The tone is gossipy, offering a window into the intimate and grimy perspectives of these characters, the details of which would have been highly confronting at the time of the novel's publication.

Particularly, issues of corruption and "unholiness" within the ranks of the Catholic Church, and sexual exploitation of children or teenagers by priests - portrayed in the 1960s as occurring due to repressed sexuality or latent homosexuality - were favoured topics of Astley's. A discerning contemporary reader in the 2020s may find this unsatisfactory, not only because the character Father Lake can effectively walk away without recrimination, but because young John Terope is himself given a tarring with a black brush at the climax of the novel. This is Astley's way of showing that no-one is perfect, but perhaps unnecessarily implies that John might be able to be viewed as partly to blame for Lake's indiscretion, thereby allowing a further avenue by which Lake can be let off the hook. Similarly, a list of marital indiscretions by Kathleen, revealed at the end of the book, disrupts her prior characterisation within her marriage to Gerald.

The novel also touches on issues of colonisation, and the impacts this had on indigenous populations, in this case in Pacific Island communities.

== Critical reception ==
In The Canberra Times Liam Mason noted that the reader was able to sympathise with the novel's characters: "There is also an almost depressing realism in Miss Astley's resolutions of her characters' crises: the failure of a friend, the failure of a marriage, the failure of a priest, the failure (at the most trivial level) of a womaniser in a would-be seduction. For there is not necessarily any solution. Nor need there be a new start after the ritual of death and disaster."

Michael Wilding, writing in Southerly found a lot to like about the book, but also had some reservations: "The precision of the writing, the spareness and clarity, are immediately appealing. But as the novel progresses the lack of any substantial content lets the writing drift towards the somewhat consciously fine, and the religious references—the recurrent calvaries, crucifixions and expiations, become obtrusive."

== See also ==
- 1968 in Australian literature
