= Mort aux Chats =

1972 poem by Australian poet Peter Porter

- by Peter Porter
- Country: Australia
- Language: English
- Publisher: Preaching to the Converted by Peter Porter
- Publication date: 1972
- Lines: 36

"Mort aux Chats" (1880) is a poem by Australian writer Peter Porter.

It was originally published in the poet's collection Preaching to the Converted and was later published in other collections of the author's poetry, and in a number of poetry anthologies.

== Synopsis ==
Peter Porter begins his poem by stating "There will be no more cats", and ends it by announcing "The Rule of Dogs shall last a thousand years!" These bookends bracket a series of satirical pseudo-racist statements decrying the very existence of cats: "Perhaps they are all right in/their own country but their/traditions are alien to ours."

== Critical reception ==
In his commentary on the poem in 60 Classic Australian Poems Geoff Page called this "one of the great satirical poems in twentieth-centry English." He commented that here Porter "has nailed down the xenophobic paranoia so conclusively that one would think that it might never raise its head (or bark!) again."

Writing about the author after his death in 2010, Australian poet John Kinsella quoted from this poem and noted: "Porter was able to be political in his poetry without dogmatism, and could ask big spiritual questions without having to be 'contemplative'. Satire, irony, razor-sharp social observation, and a world of references, would combine in finely-turned works that owed much to the eighteenth-century Augustan poets."

== Publication history ==
After the poem's initial publication in Preaching to the Converted in 1972 it was reprinted as follows:

- The Oxford Book of Contemporary Verse, 1945-1980 edited by D. J. Enright, Oxford University Press, 1980
- Collected Poems by Peter Porter, Oxford University Press, 1983
- The Penguin Book of Australian Satirical Verse edited by Philip Neilsen, Penguin, 1986
- Two Centuries of Australian Poetry edited by Mark O’Connor, Oxford University Press, 1988
- A Porter Selected : Poems 1959-1989 by Peter Porter, Oxford University Press, 1989
- The Hutchinson Book of Post-war British Poets edited by Dannie Abse, Hutchinson, 1989
- The Sting in the Wattle : Australian Satirical Verse edited by Philip Neilsen, University of Queensland Press, 1993
- Collected Poems by Peter Porter, Oxford University Press, 1999
- 80 Great Poems from Chaucer to Now edited by Geoff Page, University of NSW Press, 2006
- 60 Classic Australian Poems edited by Geoff Page, University of NSW Press, 2009
- The Rest on the Flight : Selected Poems by Peter Porter, Allen and Unwin, 2010

The poem was also translated into Indonesian in 1991.

== See also ==
- 1972 in Australian literature
- 1972 in poetry

== Notes ==
- You can read the full text of the poem on the Clive James poetry site.
