= The Well Dressed Explorer =

1962 Australian novel by Thea Astley

- First edition
- Author: Thea Astley
- Language: English
- Publisher: Angus and Robertson
- Publication date: 1962
- Publication place: Australia
- Media type: Print (Hardback & Paperback)
- Pages: 254
- Preceded by: A Descant for Gossips
- Followed by: The Slow Natives

The Well Dressed Explorer (1962) is a Miles Franklin Award-winning novel by Australian author Thea Astley. This novel shared the award with The Cupboard Under the Stairs by George Turner.

== Plot summary ==
The novel follows journalist, George Brewster, who moves from city to city, from empty love affair to empty love affair, until he dies. He is married, but faithless to his wife...and is ultimately a "pathetic figure".

== Themes ==
The themes of this novel are common to Astley's novels: "the hurts inflicted inadvertently and deliberately on others, the terrible shallowness underlying the inability to identify imaginatively with others, and the destruction of others and of the self by wrongly conceived actions."

== Critical reception ==
In The Canberra Times "M.D." noted: "The book is the portrait of one of the most unforgettable characters in Australian fiction, George Brewster. His life is traced from his boyhood in Queensland to his death as a leading journalist in Sydney. He is seen from every angle — from the inner workings of his petty, selfish mind to his social, sexual and religious relations." And concluded: "For all the surface brilliance of the prose, for all the psychological validity of the portrait, one feels that this is only another slice of life and hasn't one the right to demand from the novelist some assessment of the significance of her creation?"

Lisa Hill on the ANZLitLovers Litblog commented: "The extensive use of complex metaphor can be taxing sometimes, but is offset by her wit; her passion for exposing petty corruption, injustice and human stupidity; and her brilliant observations of people at their most banal. All these are superbly in evidence in her third novel The Well-dressed Explorer, but if you don’t like to have your brain circuits stretched by imagery used in new and challenging ways; if you’re put off by lush poetic descriptions or if you just like a what-happened-next kind of a story, then Thea Astley may not be for you."

== See also ==
- 1962 in Australian literature
- Middlemiss.org
- Taylor, Cheryl and Perkins, Elizabeth (2007) "Warm words: North Queensland writing" in Patrick Buckridge and Elizabeth McKay (ed.) By the Book: A Literary History of Queensland, St Lucia, University of Queensland Press
