= Rie Yasumi =

Japanese senryū poet (born 1972)

- 休 理英子
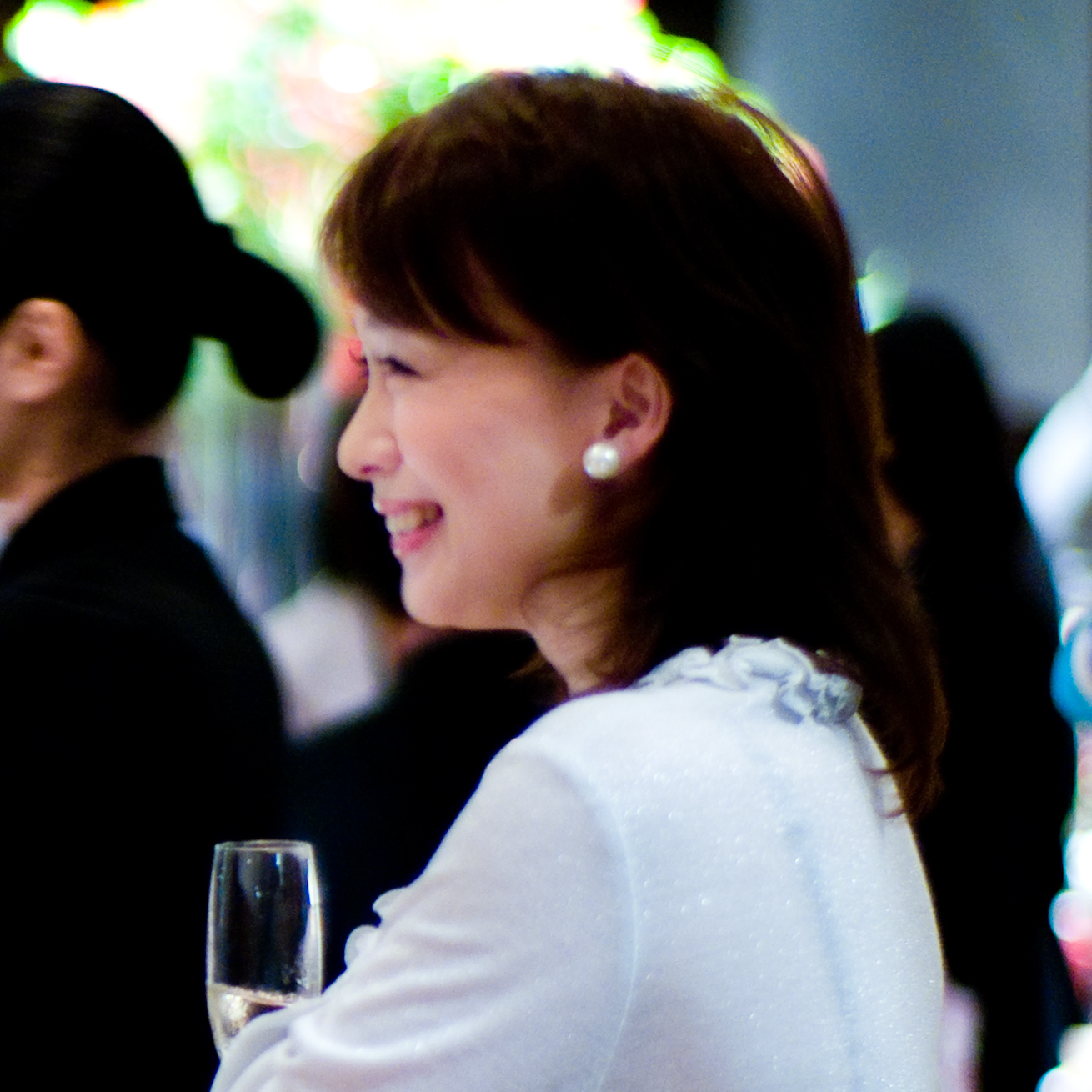
- Born: Rieko Yasumi; March 1, 1972 (age 54)
- Education: Otemae University
- Occupation: Senryū poet

Rie Yasumi (やすみ りえ) (born 1 March 1972 in Kobe, Hyogo) is a Japanese senryū poet, a graduate of Otemae University. Her real name is Rieko Yasumi (休 理英子, Yasumi Rieko).

== Bibliography ==
- 平凡な兎 ("Ordinary Rabbit"), 2001, ISBN 978-4-89008-284-1
- やすみりえのとっておき川柳道場 ("Senryu Dojo reserve: Fun begins at any time"), 2001, ISBN 978-4-88854-415-3
- やすみりえのトキメキ川柳, 2005, ISBN 978-4-88854-423-8
- ハッピーエンドにさせてくれない神様ね 20065, ISBN 978-4-86044-283-5
