= Otemae College =

College in Japan

Coordinates: 34°44′16.9″N 135°19′31.8″E

- 大手前短期大学
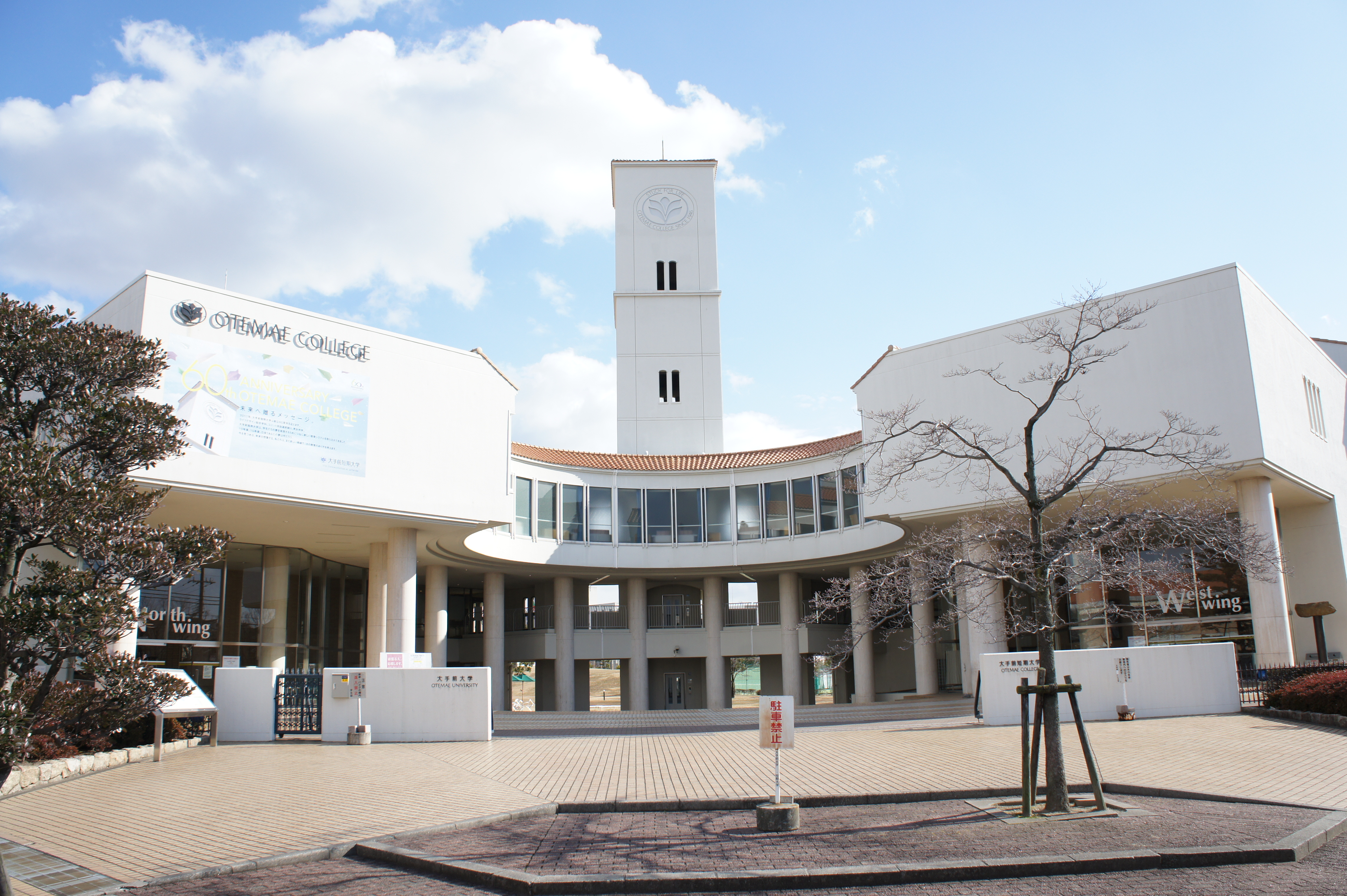
- Otemae University Itami campus
- Type: Private; Junior college
- Established: 1951
- Location: Nishinomiya, Hyōgo, Japan
- Website: http://www.otemae.ac.jp/tandai/

Otemae College (大手前短期大学, Otemae Tanki Daigaku) is a private junior college in the city of Nishinomiya, Hyōgo, Japan. This junior college was part of the Otemae Gakuen Education Group, along with Otemae University.

== History ==
The junior college opened in April 1951 in the city of Osaka for women only. In 1986, the campus moved to the city of Itami. The junior college became coeducational in 2004.

The college moved to Nishinomiya in 2021. The former Itami campus was later demolished in the same year.

== Courses ==
- Life design: studies for home making
