= Vanishing Points =

Book by Thea Astley

- First edition
- Author: Thea Astley
- Language: English
- Publisher: Heinemann, Australia
- Publication date: 1992
- Publication place: Australia
- Media type: Print (Hardback and Paperback)
- Pages: 234
- ISBN: 9780399137709
- Preceded by: Reaching Tin River
- Followed by: Coda

Vanishing Points (1992) is a novel by Australian author Thea Astley. It consists of two loosely linked novellas, The Genteel Poverty Bus Company and Inventing the Weather.

== Reviews ==
A reviewer for Publishers Weekly noted: "As depicted in these two wickedly observant, interlinked novellas, the southeastern 'gold coast' of the author's native Australia is a den of dropouts, rednecks, ex-hippies, oldtimers and misfits--free spirits seeking liberty and self-definition in a world where progress threatens all that is authentically Australian...Astley (Hunting the Wild Pineapple) has a quicksilver prose style and a keen satirical eye that make this book a delight."

On Kirkus Reviews the reviewer found the book "A bit like the wickedly fun and satiric Fay Weldon. Sometimes cerebrally overengaged in style, but always fresh and inventive."

== Awards and nominations ==
- 1993 shortlisted Miles Franklin Award

== See also ==
- 1992 in Australian literature
