= Coda (novel) =

Book by Thea Astley

- First edition
- Author: Thea Astley
- Language: English
- Publisher: Heinemann, Australia
- Publication date: 1994
- Publication place: Australia
- Media type: Print (hardback & paperback)
- Pages: 188 pp
- ISBN: 0855615443
- Preceded by: Vanishing Points
- Followed by: The Multiple Effects of Rainshadow

Coda is a 1994 novel by Australian author Thea Astley.

== Plot summary ==
The novel -- a satire and social commentary on old age, and how our bewildered elders may be treated by careless family members and a profit-seeking care system -- concerns "a spiky old lady" Kathleen Hackendorf, who is a retired woman living in Queensland, Australia. Kathleen grew up in Townsville, in north Queensland, married and raised a family, then was later employed in admin. She has now reached the age when she is faced with having to decide where she is going to live until the end of her days.

"[D]ozing and daydreaming her way into decrepitude and oblivion", Kathleen reviews her memories of dating, marriage and child-rearing through an internal monologue, finding that "the 'pictures came in savagely illuminated splats', edged by disappointment and unnameable desire." This series of memories, interspersed with contemporary narrative events - and some disordered thinking - often focus on her now-deceased best friend Daisy ('Daise'), her also-deceased husband Ronald, or her children Brian ('Brain') and Shamrock ('Sham'), or grandchildren including Bridget ('Bridgie'). Kathleen has lately begun to be disoriented and had become lost on some occasions when venturing out of her home, sometimes driven home by police. She was then informed that a government department required her to vacate her house, which they intended to take possession of as right-of-way for a new road.

Kathleen's trajectory is interspersed with that of her son 'Brain'. Brain's personal and business failings, his marriage to 'Bosie' ("the daughter of a speculator who had made a killing"), his later construction of a giant fibreglass "Big Developer" that rivals the Big Pineapple, Big Prawn etc and serves to ridicule his financially flush back-bencher brother-in-law, Sham's husband, Len, as well as his later affair with Nina and relationship change, all help to add spice, colour and humour to the serious topic of this short novel. Through Kathleen's own marriage, but also through Brain's and Sham's marriages, Astley weaves into the story her characteristically acid view of the role and realities of marriage, and in this tale she also refers to the colonial presence of whites in the Solomon Islands (where Kathleen's father-in-law had been in business), and with heavy irony to the decades-long trend of rapid land development in Queensland that devastated natural environments such as swamp-lands and coastal scrub.

Musing - through humorous memories of times spent "doing the cafes" with 'Daise' - Kathleen is able to categorise the "four ages of women [as]: bimbo, breeder, baby-sitter, [and] burden". In her latter years she understands herself to be a burden in the eyes of both her adult children, except when available to "baby-sit" Sham and Len's rebellious, "boy mad" young teenage daughter Bridgie who is "expensive to run". When requested to vacate her long-term home in Ascot, Brisbane, she wants to be able to call on her children for help, but they have their own selfish lives to lead: Shamrock (Sham) - also living in Brisbane - is the pre-occupied and self-obsessed wife of a crooked politician, and Brain, who was miserably married, is later occupied with his new partner Nina as a restaurateur in Far North Queensland. Kathleen goes to stay with Brain for a short time, but, returning to her Ascot home, discovers that Sham has emptied it, sold off Kathleen's possessions and had her dog put down. She had not remembered unwittingly signing over her power of attorney to Len. As she would be a hindrance to their "illusory liberty", neither of her adult children want much to do with Kathleen, and Sham packs her off unceremoniously to a tiny apartment in Passing Downs retirement village - which Len has financial interests in - despite her protests.

In the final section, in the face of her now-deteriorating comprehension, Kathleen refuses to be "rendered invisible" as a result of her age and fights to maintain her dignity. With the aim of reaching "the island" (Magnetic Island, off the coast of Townsville - used a symbol of escape, happiness and self-realisation), she "makes one last dash for her own freedom. "It's time to go feral,'' she announces to a stranger. "Tribes of feral grandmothers holed up in the hills - just imagine it - refusing to take on those time-honoured mindings and moppings up after the little ones while the big ones jaunt into the distance.''

However, in Astley's typical fashion, the culmination of the story offers no relief. In the closing passages, Kathleen's mind is clearly confused, delusional, and making only limited sense of her surroundings, despite apparently (or possibly?) having taken a plane north and the ferry to the island. Astley's inclusion of fictionalised news cuttings about "granny-dumping" -- several incidences of lost, unidentifiable and disoriented elderly people -- serve to contextualise Kathleen's experiences as a widespread social problem.

== Analysis ==
Susan Sheridan, reviewing Karen Lamb's biography of Astley in Sydney Review of Books, notes "the distinctive narrative voice that recurs throughout Astley's writing [is] sardonic, darkly humorous, satirical, angry... [W]hile [a] darkness of depression hovers over [her] characters, the writing is always flamboyant, as if energised by anger and frustration... for example... [evidenced by] Kathleen... the elderly narrator [in] Coda. ... A major source of Astley's characteristic anger was her position as a woman. The frustrations she experienced with the expectation that she would ... accept her second-class lot without complaint, that she would suppress her desires and defer to men, were shared with many women of her generation." In Coda, Astley applies the same level of criticism that she gives to women's roles and position to the issues that surround ageing and aged care.

A review of Coda for St Arnaud Books notes that: "Aged care provision is a very lucrative industry, and stereotypes [of the elderly] of course are much easier to cater for [and] commodify ... [while] our revulsion at ageing enables the aged care industry. ... [T]he Royal Commission into Aged Care ... revealed the shocking scale of sexual and psychological abuse, together with cost saving cruelties, flourishing in deregulated ‘Care’ homes. ... It is our fault. We ‘other’ and dehumanise the elderly."

Kirkus Review states that: "the vast emptiness surrounding Astley's characters is a symptom of psychology rather than setting," suggesting the relevance of the topic of this novel for places beyond Queensland and Australia.

== Reviews ==
- Publishers' Weekly: "...sparks of humor provide balance, humanizing a fictional landscape that otherwise promises little hope or compassion."
- Kirkus Review: "A spare, sharp-boned bird of a novel, whose song is wrenchingly sad yet full of indomitable spirit. ... Astley is a marvelous writer and a hilarious, merciless, and poignant truth-teller."
- Margaret (Meg) Broughton, in ANZ LitLovers LitBlog, writes that this novel will "make you grimace in its truthfulness...[as] Thea Astley’s harsh thoughts on marriage, children, ageing and dementia...cast a critical eye on society. ...[A] marvellous read despite the gloomy themes."

== Notes ==
- This novel was selected as a New York Times Book Review Notable Book of 1994: "In a shopping mall in northern Australia, the spirited, eccentric heroine of Ms. Astley's 13th novel, a kind of female Lear, contemplates her past and articulates her wrath at age and abandonment."

== See also ==
- 1994 in Australian literature
