= Girl with a Monkey =

Book by Thea Astley

- First edition
- Author: Thea Astley
- Language: English
- Genre: Fiction
- Publisher: Angus and Robertson
- Publication date: 1958
- Publication place: Australia
- Media type: Print
- Pages: 144pp
- Preceded by: -
- Followed by: A Descant for Gossips

Girl with a Monkey (1958) is a novel by Australian author Thea Astley.

== Plot summary ==
The novel centres around one day in the life of a young schoolteacher in a small Queensland town. She has recently had a relationship with a local road worker, and this day is her last in the town as she prepares to transfer south to escape what appears to be a threatening situation.

== Critical reception ==
In a survey of the author's works The Oxford Companion to Australian Literature noted that: "For the self-conscious, hyperperceptive individuals on whom she concentrates, life is necessarily isolated, an unequal, doomed, tragi-comic struggle for identity and integrity. From Elsie Ford in Girl with a Monkey to Paul Vesper of The Acolyte, to Belle of Reaching Tin River, she develops related but increasingly complex studies of desperate attempts to preserve the self in the face of disintegration."

== See also ==
- 1958 in Australian literature
