= Moyshe Kulbak =

Belarusian Jewish writer

- משה קולבאַק
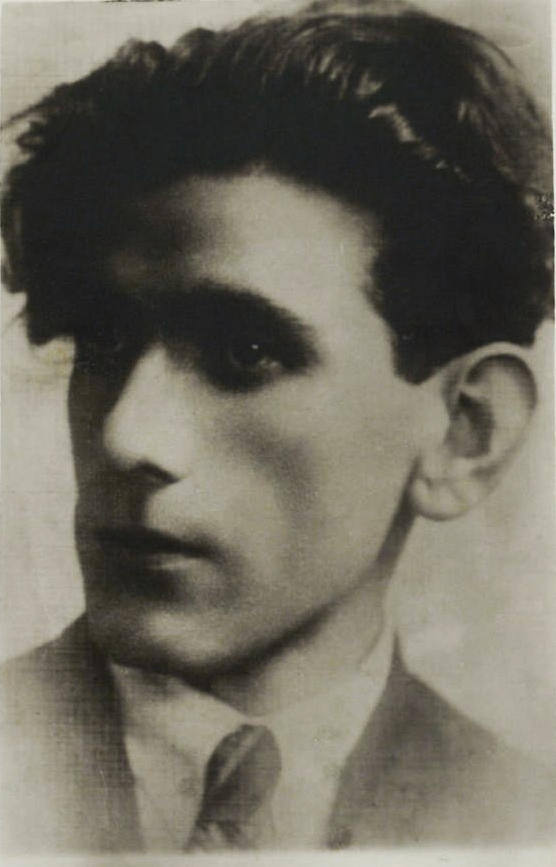
- Born: March 20, 1896; Smarhon, Belarus
- Died: October 29, 1937 (aged 41); Minsk, USSR
- Occupations: Writer, poet
- Writing career
- Language: Yiddish
- Years active: 1916–1937
- Notable works: The Messiah of the House of Ephraim (1924), The Zelmenyaners

Moyshe Kulbak (Yiddish: משה קולבאַק; Belarusian: Майсей (Мойша) Кульбак; 1896 – 1937) was a Belarusian Jewish writer who wrote in Yiddish.

== Biography ==
Born in Smarhon, Belarus, to a Jewish family, Kulbak studied at the famous Volozhin Yeshiva.

During World War I he lived in Kovno (today Kaunas, Lithuania), where he began to write poetry in Hebrew, before switching to Yiddish. He made his publishing debut in Yiddish in 1916, with the poem "Shterndl" (Little star). In 1918 he moved to the city of Minsk; in 1919, after the Soviet Revolution, to Vilna (today Vilnius, Lithuania); and in 1920 to Berlin.

In 1923 he came back to Vilna, which after the war had become part of newly independent Poland, and was a center of Yiddish literary culture. In Vilna he taught modern Yiddish literature at the Real-Gymnasium (a Yiddish-speaking high school), as well as at the Yiddish teachers' seminary. By 1928 he became disappointed with the literary atmosphere in Poland, and decided to return to Minsk (capital of the Soviet Belarus), where much of his family lived, and where there was a lively Yiddish literary scene.

In Minsk, Kulbak worked for several media organizations and for the Jewish section of the Academy of Sciences of Belarus.

Kulbak wrote poems, fantastical or "mystical" novels, and, after moving to the Soviet Union, what are described by one source as "Soviet" satires. His novel The Zelmenyaners depicted with some realism the absurdities of Soviet life.

His mystical novella The Messiah of the House of Ephraim (1924) draws together many strands of Jewish folklore and apocalyptic belief, presenting them from a perspective that owes much to German expressionist cinema. It principally concerns the poor man Benye, who may or may not be a Messiah, and whose destiny is intertwined with the Lamed-Vovniks. (In Jewish mysticism, the Lamed-Vovniks are a group of 36 holy Jews on whose goodness the whole of humanity depends.) Benye, and the many other characters, undergo experiences the strangeness of which approaches incomprehensibility, to themselves as well as the reader. Legendary figures such as Lilith and Simkhe Plakhte are characters in the novel.

In September 1937, Moyshe Kulbak was arrested during the Great Purge. He was accused of espionage and executed a month later together with several dozens of other Belarusian writers, intellectuals and administrators. In 1956, after the death of Joseph Stalin, he was officially rehabilitated by the Soviet authorities.

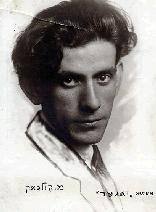
Photo of Moyshe Kulbak with his signature

== Bibliography ==
- Shirim (Poems), 1920.
- Die Shtot (The Village) (Romantic poem), 1920.
- Raysn ("Belarus") (Poems), 1922.
- Lider (Poems), 1922.
- Yankev Frank (Drama),1922.
- Meshiekh ben Efrayine (Novel), 1924.
  - The Messiah of the House of Ephraim - English translation in Yenne Velt, ed. and trans. Joachim Neugroschel (1976; repr. New York: Wallaby, 1978).
- Vilné (Poem), 1926.
- Montag (Monday) (Novel), 1926.
  - Lunes - Editado por el Círculo d´Escritores, 2014.
- Bunye un Bere afn shliakh (Novel), 1927.
- Zelminianer (Novela), 1931;
  - Зелменяне: роман (Russian edition translated by Rachel Boymvol), 1960
  - The Zelmenyaners: a family saga (English translation, 2013)
  - Зельманцы (Belarusian version), Minsk, 1960 (2nd edition - 2015);
  - Los Zelmenianos (Spanish version), Xordica editorial, Zaragoza, 2016.
- Disner Childe Harold (Child Harold from Disna) (Satiric poem), 1933.
- The Wind Who Lost His Temper,
  - English translation in Yenne Velt.
- Boitre (Dramatic poem), 1936.
- Beniomine Maguidov (Play), 1937.

== Addresses ==
- Berlin (1920–1922): Leibnizstraße 67
