= Rachel Boymvol =

Soviet poet, children's book author and translator

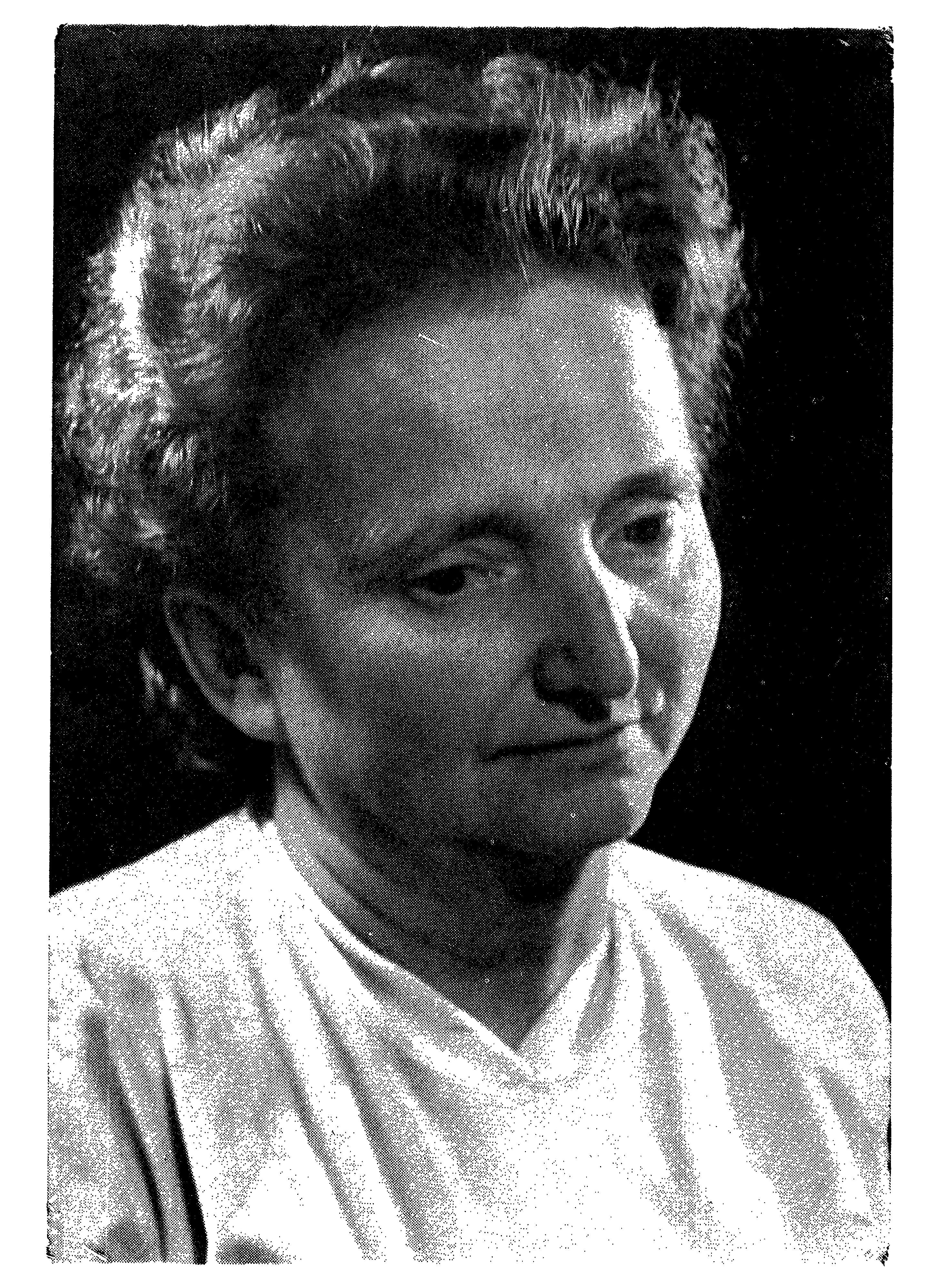
Rachel Boymvol in the early 1970s

Rachel Boymvol, sometimes spelled Baumwoll (Russian: Рахиль Львовна Баумволь, Yiddish: רחל בױמװאָל, Hebrew: רחל בוימוול; March 4, 1914, Odessa - June 16, 2000, Jerusalem) was a Soviet poet, children's book author, and translator who wrote in both Yiddish and Russian. Because of the popularity of her Soviet children's books, they were translated into multiple languages. After 1971 she emigrated to Israel and published a number of books of poetry in Yiddish.

== Biography ==
Boymvol was born in Odessa, Russian Empire on March 4, 1914. She was the daughter of Judah-Leib Boymvol, a playwright and Yiddish theatre director who was murdered in 1920 by anti-Bolshevik Polish soldiers during the Polish–Soviet War. He and members of his touring Yiddish theatre were pulled off the train at Koziatyn which was then under Polish control; he and troupe members Epstein and Liebert were killed in front of their families. Rachel was also injured in the attack and remained bedridden for several years after. Rachel grew up in a culture fluent in both Yiddish and Russian and showed an aptitude for rhyming and storytelling from a young age. She began to write at age six; at around this time she and her mother relocated to Moscow. Her first Yiddish poems were published in a Komsomol magazine when she was nine. Her first published book was a book of children's songs entitled Kinder-lider, published in 1930 with the support of Shmuel Galkin. She then studied in the Jewish department at the Second Moscow State University; she met her husband, Ziame Telesin, while in Moscow and they were married there. After they graduated in 1935 they were sent to work in Minsk, where she quickly became well known as a children's literature author.

During World War II, she went with her family to Tashkent, except for her husband who enlisted in the Red Army; it was during the war that she began to publish in Russian. She later wrote, "The Bolsheviks saved me from death, and I was a fervent Bolshevik. I drew five-cornered stars, but also six-cornered, Jewish ones, because the Bolsheviks loved Jews and would give us a country that would be called Yidland. In my head was a confusion that would last many years..." After the war she settled in Moscow, and starting in 1948 she published many poems, children's songs, and stories in Russian, as well as translating from Yiddish to Russian, including a novel by Moshe Kulbak in 1960. Her dozens of books and pamphlets of Russian-language children's songs and short stories became very popular, with some reaching a circulation of a million copies. From 1961 onwards, she became a regular contributor to the Yiddish-language journal Sovyetish Heymland, both in original pieces and in translations of Soviet poetry.

Boymvol's son Julius, who was a dissident, applied to emigrate to Israel in 1969. His parents decided to follow him, and in 1971 Rachel was allowed to emigrate to Israel. She left as part of a large wave of Soviet Jewish writers who settled in Jerusalem, which also included Meir Kharats, Yosef Kerler, and Dovid Sfard. Her husband was able to follow her there during Passover 1972. After arriving there, she lost her main source of income which was writing children's books, and she turned increasingly to publishing books of Yiddish poetry. She also continued to publish in Russian, and some of her Yiddish collections were translated into Hebrew during the following decades by Shelomo Even-Shoshan.

== Selected publications ==
- Kinder-lider (1930)
- A briv fun di arbeṭndiḳe fun der Sovetisher Gruzye dem firer fun di felḳer - dem groysn Sṭalinen (1936, with Ziame Telesin)
- Bertshik Brud: a kinder maysele un 6 ferzn (1936)
- Oysderveylte dertseylungen (1938)
- Dos tanele (1938)
- Lider (1940)
- Libshaft: lider (1947)
- Skazki dli︠a︡ vzroslykh (1963)
- Pod odnoĭ krysheĭ (1966)
- Gli︠a︡di︠a︡ v glaza: stikhi i poėma (1968)
- Oysgebenkt (1972)
- A mol iz geṿen a helfand mayselekh far ḳleyn un groys (1973)
- Fun lid tsu lid (1977)
- Dray heftn (1979)
- Aleyn dos lebn (1983)
- Mayn yidish (1988)
- Lider fun farsheydene tsayṭn 1935-1978 (1989)
- Vundervelt (1990)
- Treyst un troyer: hundert naye lider (1998)
