= A Descant for Gossips (novel) =

Book by Thea Astley

- First edition
- Author: Thea Astley
- Language: English
- Genre: Literary fiction
- Publisher: Angus and Robertson
- Publication date: 1960
- Publication place: Australia
- Media type: Print
- Pages: 263pp
- Preceded by: Girl with a Monkey
- Followed by: The Well Dressed Explorer

A Descant for Gossips (1960) is a novel by Australian author Thea Astley.

== Plot summary ==
In a dusty Queensland country town young Vinny Lalor is bullied by her fellow students at the local high school. Her teacher, Helen Striebel, is the only one to show Vinny any support and when the teacher is involved in a scandal with a fellow male teacher, Vinny is again hurt.

At the same time, teacher Mrs Striebel and English teacher Moller are beginning a tentative and careful love affair. In a country town, where rumour becomes truth, gossip is the primary conversation and small-minded meanness predominates, the two teachers, while understanding the place, do not fully anticipate the risks they are taking.

Vinny, as an immature thirteen year old, has a crush on her teacher Mrs Striebel. The relationship seems to be the only thing of value in Vinny's life.

As a shy and unfriended child, Vinny is shunned and misunderstood by the students and adults living in the town. Her life, as it is, is bearable, but when she is kissed by a local boy after the school dance, girls in her class seek to hurt her in ways that have nothing to do with truth and everything to do with hurting the vulnerable Vinny and her teacher.

The adult gossips have a field day, ensuring the whole town hears of the scandalous behaviour of Mrs Striebel and Moller, who have fallen in love (despite Moller's wife being terminally ill and living elsewhere).

Mrs Striebel senses, rather than knows, that Vinny struggles with her life as defined by the town. Vinny's lack of knowledge and her small town surroundings ensure she has no understanding about how life really should be.

Despite the teachers' endeavours to keep their love affair private, a group of students from Vinny's school decide to 'stick the knife in', putting lewd and suggestive comments in public places around the town and in the school.

In this period of Australian history, small-minded malevolent behaviour is the norm. The teachers find themselves maligned at every turn and have no avenue of appeal to truth and common sense. Within a short while, the head master of the school decides to move Mrs Striebel to another school. In its worst form, this speaks of the male 'sowing his wild oats' as the woman is cast as a tart. Vinny finds herself to be the only person in the town who wants to protect Mrs Striebel.

The novel focuses on the cruel pettiness of a small town country community as it is experienced by Vinny, Helen Striebel and English teacher Moller. The dusty Queensland tropical background and small town meanness are significant but secondary to the main themes of desired love and a lack of intellectual stimuli. It affects every aspect of the town and the lives of the people, but specifically, in this novel, anyone who is different or who speaks out. The main characters are marginalised in every possible way.

== Critical reception ==
Joyce Halstead in The Australian Women's Weekly was impressed: "This gifted writer has drawn with a scholar's touch a sensitive and intense study in human emotions played out against the cruel pettiness of a small town community. The dusty Queensland tropical background, so well described, is significant, but remains unobtrusively incidental to the main theme. An excellent and important new novel."

== Television adaptation ==
In 1983 a television mini-series based on the book was released. It was directed by Tim Burstall, based on a script by Burstall and Ted Roberts, and featured Kaarin Fairfax, Geneviève Picot and Peter Carroll in the lead roles.

== See also ==
- 1960 in Australian literature
