= The Acolyte (novel) =

1972 novel by Thea Astley

- First edition
- Author: Thea Astley
- Language: English
- Publisher: Angus and Robertson
- Publication date: 1972
- Publication place: Australia
- Media type: Print (Hardback & Paperback)
- Pages: 158pp
- ISBN: 0207124221
- Preceded by: A Boat Load of Home Folk
- Followed by: A Kindness Cup

The Acolyte is a Miles Franklin Award-winning novel by Australian author Thea Astley first published in 1972.

== Plot summary ==
The novel is told in the first person by "the acolyte", Paul Vesper. The novel traces the career of a fictional Australian musician and composer named Jack Holberg. Beginning in obscurity as a piano player in "Grogbusters", a dreary little Southern Queensland town, the blind Holberg eventually gains international recognition as a composer. Vesper, who had met Holberg during his less renowned period, gives up an engineering career to serve the great man—in a sense, to become his eyes.

=== Setting ===
The central characters and the focus of the story move from humble beginnings in Grogbusters, to a cutting edge harbour development site in North Queensland, then back down south to a creative retreat developed by Holberg in the Gold Coast hinterland.

=== Characters ===
In the lush coastal hinterland, a complex triadic relationship develops between Vesper, Holberg and Holberg's passive wife Hilda, into which are also drawn others, mainly Hilda's sister Ilsa, Ilsa's husband, her son Jamie, and Holberg's aunt Sadie. Around this core family group - which Vesper is very much a part of - gather numerous society buffs, media critics, and "sycophantic" fans, all fatuously devoted to the unseeing genius of Holberg as he creates his music.

=== Themes ===
- Astley deeply explores interpersonal relationships and psychologies of the main characters with an intensity that is heightened by her thickly layered use of vocabulary. It is relieved however by humorous notes, including the ironic, almost caustic, descriptions of fans, media personalities and aspects of entertainment culture. Holberg's own blind blunders, and the antics of particular characters such as Aunt Sadie, as well as frequent references to alcohol consumption add further comic touches.
- The absurdities of modern culture are a frequent topic. For example when, looking over the town of "Glitterlights" (the Gold Coast in the early 1970s), Vesper describes how: "the lights behind us break out along the tops of the buildings like hair dye".
- Astley acidly puts the foibles and failings of human nature, and their potential impacts in relationship, under a microscope, observing the decline in mental health of those characters who devote themselves completely to the service of Holberg. This - due to his egotism, insensitivity, and cruelty - ultimately proves to be at their own expense.
- As she has often done, Astley exposes sexual infidelities with a great sense of both tongue-in-cheek and matter-of-fact, bringing these out of the closet into a glaringly bright spotlight.
- A further major focus for Astley is the creative, sometimes zany and uniquely adapted, use of considerable vocabulary, and terminology (the latter mainly from the world of music). This helps to develop Vesper's narrative and colourful descriptions, in a way that can be extremely witty, yet introspective and revelatory, permitting a view into the complex inner workings of characters, as observed through Vesper's eyes. The language, while embracing the modern, is also poetic and beautiful at times, especially some evocations of nature, such as: "...a kingfisher left its jet-flight blue streak across the loquat trees".

== Notes ==
In an interview noted in The Canberra Times, Astley stated that she wrote the book partly in answer to Patrick White's The Vivisector. "Why write only about the great, changing Christ figures?" she asked a Sydney journalist. "Why not write about the other people who share their lives?"

== Critical reception ==
After the novel had been republished in the US in 1988 Kirkus Reviews wasn't overly impressed: "In The Acolyte (1972), a failed engineer and two German sisters devote themselves, body and soul, to the whims of an egotistical blind composer. The author uses great care in dissecting the minutest variations in their orgies of self-sacrifice, but she neglects to show what it is that draws them to destruction. All three are willing doormats from the start. As a result, there is a good deal of truth in Astley's observations but very little interest. Nor are matters helped any by an ostentatiously prickly style."

Writing in an overview of Astley's work in 2010 Megha Trivedi stated: "The novel carries human element of love, the frustration of Paul Vesper and his brutal reaction against the selfishness of Holberg. The Acolyte highlights the never ending personal, spiritual and artistic desires of human beings."

Toni Jordan, writing in The Guardian in 2019, sees The Acolyte as being "about art...genius...fear...self-consciousness and the folly of pomposity", and she celebrates "the sheer vivacity of the language", and aspects of the plot that are "darkly hilarious and cutting".

Lisa Hill, in ANZ Lit Lovers, in 2009 describes the novel as "witty, intelligent", "a treasure", but also "bitter and cynical" and "wickedly funny", with "moments of poignant empathy for...disability".

As a reviewer for The Canberra Times, Marian Eldridge (1972) - presenting the earliest of these reviews - asks an obvious question which was no doubt uppermost in Astley's own mind, that is: "To what extent is genius entitled to special rights and privileges?" Describing complex relational aspects of Holberg's "victims", Eldridge suggests: "For some, then, liberation is a form of self-destruction". She criticises Astley's writing style, however, as "contrived and self-conscious", and "lack[ing] the sensuous pleasure of the best of prose", saying that: "In a novel about exploitation and manipulation, one should not be conscious of the author pulling strings".

== Publishing history ==
After its original publication by Angus and Robertson in 1972, the novel was published as follows:

- University of Queensland Press 1980, Australia
- G. P. Putnam's Sons 1988, USA (as a part of Two by Astley: A Kindness Cup and the Acolyte)
- Penguin Books 1990, USA
- University of Queensland Press 1998, Australia
- Untapped 2021, Australia

== Awards ==
The Acolyte won the Miles Franklin Award in 1972. This was the third time Astley won this award for a novel.

== See also ==
- 1972 in Australian literature
