= Otemae University =

Liberal arts university in Kansai, Japan

Coordinates: 34°45′50.37″N 135°25′1.94″E

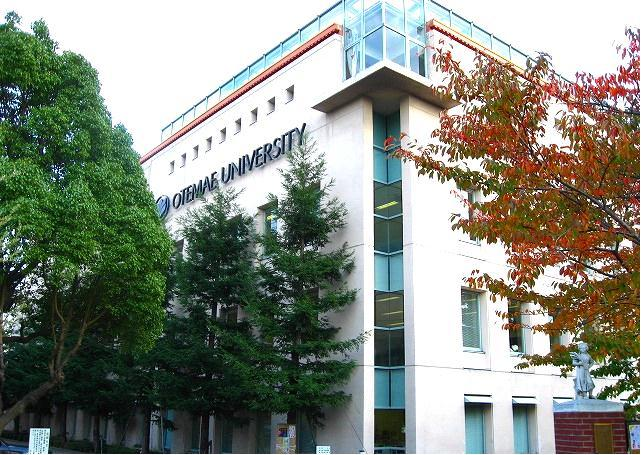
Otemae University Sakura Shukugawa campus in Nishinomiya

Otemae University (Japanese: 大手前大学 Ōtemae Daigaku) is a liberal arts oriented school that began in 1946. Located in the Kansai region of Japan, the university has a campus in Osaka and a co-educational branch in Nishinomiya. A third campus for freshman students previously existed in Itami, but it was disbanded and subsequently demolished in 2021.

The university boasts research institutes specializing in history and intercultural studies. Notably, the Nishinomiya campus includes a traditional Japanese teahouse.

Study abroad programs are offered by the school to Canada, China, South Korea, the United Kingdom, and the United States.
