= It's Raining in Mango =

1987 novel by Thea Astley

- Author: Thea Astley
- Language: English
- Set in: Australia, North Queensland, 1860s to 1980s.
- Publisher: G.P. Putnam's Sons (1987); Viking (1987, 1988); Penguin (1989).
- Publication place: United States; Australia
- Preceded by: Beachmasters (1985)
- Followed by: Reaching Tin River (1990)

It's Raining in Mango is a 1987 novel by Thea Astley (1925-2004) and was her tenth novel (of fifteen). It won the inaugural Steele Rudd Award in 1988.

== Plot summary ==
It's Raining in Mango narrates the history of the Laffey family across four generations in a series of short stories, through the ageing eyes of Connie, a woman in North Queensland in her later years. Connie creates connections between the family’s generations, highlighting strong female characters, and the fallibility of male characters, beginning with the family of Cornelius Laffey, born 1838, and his wife Jessica Olive, born 1847. The couple married in 1861.

Cornelius moved his family to the fictitious township of Charco (equating Cooktown) in then-undeveloped North Queensland, in the wild days of the Australian gold rush era. Their daughter, Nadine, born 1865, later bears a child named Harry, born 1878 during her teenage years. She then absconds without the baby, to work as a prostitute, but is drowned in a torrential flood after the 1879 cyclone. Shortly after Nadine leaves, Cornelius also disappears, heading back down south and deserting Jessica Olive, who continues to run the Port of Call pub alone. Harry is raised by Jessica, alongside her other child, a son George (born 1868). Harry later marries Clytie, to whom he is habitually unfaithful, thereby reflecting the absences of both his birth mother and his grandfather and any possible father figure.

Cornelius and Jessica’s son George as a child is traumatised by the ‘bonefield’ he sees at the site of a massacre of Aboriginal people (also see Australian frontier wars). George feels that his bones must be the same as theirs, and later befriends an Aboriginal child who survived. Cornelius was also horrified, and wrote articles decrying mistreatments and unreasoned shooting of Aboriginal people, which leads to his being sacked.

:NOTE: The massacre Astley has fictionalised was likely an 1874-1875 "dressing [down]" of Aboriginal people at Blackfellow's Creek, Palmer River area, in Far North Queensland.

Later in life George marries Mag, almost thirty years his junior, and they have two children, Connie, born 1922, and Will. After their parents’ death in the 1930s depression, Connie and Will go to live with Harry and Clytie.

Will was born in 1923 and later served in World War 2, but never married following his return from the war. Haunted by his attraction to other men, he retreats into himself, a long-term loner, remaining on the farm near a tablelands location called Mango until his later suicide, after an insulting rejection by a young man he was infatuated with.

Connie becomes a single mother to her son Reever (born 1943), to an American serviceman. As a feminist, she battles her personal experiences not only of the impacts of the intense tropical heat and humidity, and the ambience of the North Queensland environs, but exhibits a staunch perseverance, adaptation to circumstances and social change, and the assertion that she embodies her ancestors through her own life, despite the family dwindling in numbers.

As an adult her son Reever, “last seen heading north”, joins environmental protests. His character has been interpreted as representing an embrace of the tropical north and a possible break from the failures of previous generations, although the narrative also leaves open the possibility that those patterns may recur.

Connie’s recollecting of the wiles of these various familial generations takes place through the medium of a delirious concussion, sustained from a fall, after observing Reever chained in the crown of a tree, protesting against the clearing of rainforest.

Through various parts of the narrative are interwoven another group of characters, being the members of four generations of an Aboriginal North Queensland family, the Mumblers. This allows connections to be explored between white settler families in Australia and the original peoples and how profoundly they were affected by changes taking place over time. The Mumblers suffer through the massacre times, followed by removals of children (see stolen generations), and violent beatings that are ignored by police and even by the hippie protestors.

It’s Raining in Mango was published in 1987, the year prior to the 1988 Australian Bicentenary celebration of Australia’s colonisation by the British. By positioning various members of the Laffey family against contextual backgrounds, the novel exposes a mismatch between some heroics in themes of Australian history - (white settlement, the gold rush, murders and brutal treatment of Aboriginal people, social impacts of world war 2, civil rights including women's rights unfolding in large part due to the actions of strong women, and a continued expansion of the protest movement, from a 1970s civil rights base, to become the 1980s movement seeking to preserve natural environments) - and the "realities" of life, seen through personal and familial eyes.

There is another hint of Astley’s engagement with contemporary issues of homosexuality (re Will), and difficult sexuality (Connie's teenage relationship with a Catholic priest, and one-time liaison with Will), as Reever is described in the opening passages of the book, wearing a skirt while he is up the tree. Because Reever is in his early 40s, he may or may not have children, and could possibly become the last of the Laffey line.

== Notes ==
Susan Sheridan (2015) believes It’s Raining in Mango “presents a family, the Laffeys, as a microcosm of the national story”.

Writing about the novel in 2017, Cheryl M Taylor observes that “the short settler history of tropical Queensland brings the past and present into close association”.

Deborah Jordan and Louise Poland (2013) state: “we … need to revisit the strengths of Astley’s tropical imagination. Astley often ... used the tropics as ‘a site of difference’ in her work".

Kara Nicholson observes that “Astley uses the particular failings of each member of the Laffey...[family] to parody the failure of the popular narrative of Australian history”.

== Themes ==
- Phases of Australian history - 1860s to 1980s.
- The tropical north.
- Sexuality and gender.
- Brutal treatment of Aboriginal people in Australia's history.
- Generational family relationships.

== Awards and nominations ==
Winner of the inaugural Steele Rudd Award, in 1988.

This award was given for short story collections. Due to the format of the novel, in short story chapters, it was considered for this award.

== Publishing history ==
It’s Raining in Mango was first published in 1987 in New York by G.P. Putnam's Sons. It was published in Australia by Viking in 1987 and 1988, and by Penguin in March 1989.
