= Head-Waters =

1972 poetry collection by Peter Skrzynecki

- Author: Peter Skrzynecki
- Language: English
- Genre: Poetry collection
- Publisher: Lyre Bird Writers
- Publication date: 1972
- Publication place: Australia
- Media type: Print
- Pages: 61 pp.
- Awards: 1972 Grace Leven Prize for Poetry

Head-Waters is a collection of poems by Australian poet Peter Skrzynecki, published by Lyre Bird Writers in 1972.

The collection contains 45 poems from a variety of sources.

The collection won the Grace Leven Prize for Poetry in 1972.

== Contents ==
- "Weeping Rock"
- "Wollomombi Falls"
- "Moonbi Hills"
- "The Grandmother"
- "Jeogla"
- "The Kookaburra"
- "The Burning Tractor"
- "Wyatts Creek"
- "Wallamumbi"
- "Styx River"
- "Small School at Kunghur"
- "Lorikeets (for Noel and Norma Howard)"
- "Mount Warning"
- "Flying Foxes"
- "Bushfires at Kunghur"
- "Winter: Tweed River Valley"
- "A Last Mile at Uki"
- "Bell-bird"
- "The Finches"
- "Snake Country"
- "Sundowner"
- "The Cicada Nymph"
- "Colo River"
- "Time Without Season "
- "A Death in Paddington"
- "Genesis"
- "Theorem"
- "Sylvia Plath"
- "Migrant Bachelor"
- "Between One Poem and the Next"
- "Calvary Hospital"
- "Randolph Stow"
- "Somewhere, Between the First Breath and the Last"
- "Ephpheta"
- "X-Ray (for Dr. Frank Croll)"
- "The Woman I Never Knew: For Elizabeth Gill"
- "Sixth of April"
- "Sometimes, in a Dream or Thought"
- "Pietà"
- "Scarborough Cemetery"
- "Sandy Blight"
- "First of March"
- "Long Before the Word is Spoken"
- "Words Beyond a Speech of Music"

== Critical reception ==
Writing in Hemisphere magazine reviewer R. F. Brissenden noted that with this collection the poet had found his "individual voice" and that the collection offered " a compelling sense of participating in another man's experience of the world."

In The Age R. A. Simpson remarked that there is "a high degree of original writing" in this collection.

== See also ==
- 1972 in Australian literature
