= Peter Skrzynecki =

Australian poet

- Born: Peter Michael Skrzynecki; 1945 (age 80–81); Germany
- Occupation: Poet
- Writing career
- Notable awards: 1972 Grace Leven Prize for Poetry

Peter Michael Skrzynecki OAM (Polish pronunciation: [skʂɨˈɲɛtskʲi], Australian pronunciation: /ʃəˈnɛski/; born 6 April 1945) is an Australian poet of Polish and Ukrainian origin.

== Biography ==
Born in the German hamlet of Ihmert, now part of Hemer, Skrzynecki came to Australia in 1949 with his parents, Feliks and Kornelia, as a refugee from "the sorrow / Of northern wars" ("Crossing the Red Sea"). This voyage – a four-week-long sea expedition on the USS General R. M. Blatchford, a converted United States Navy transport ship, was the basis for many of the poems in his 1975 collection, Immigrant Chronicle.

Skrzynecki attended St Patrick's College, Strathfield between 1956 and 1963, completing his Leaving Certificate at the college. His education here influenced many works later in his career.

He holds a Bachelor of Arts from the University of New England, and a Teachers Certificate from the Sydney Teachers' College and a Master of Arts from the University of Sydney. As of 2022, Skrzynecki is an adjunct associate professor at Western Sydney University.

== Career and awards ==
Skrzynecki has taught various courses relating to literature, including English Studies, American Literature, Australian Literature and Creative Writing. He has received several awards for his contributions to Australian and multicultural literature, including the Grace Leven Prize for Poetry in 1972 for Headwaters, the Captain Cook Bicentenary Poetry Prize, the Henry Lawson Short Story Award, an Order of Cultural Merit from the Polish government in 1989 and in 2002, the Medal of the Order of Australia. Skrzynecki visits schools and gives lectures on the current topic area of Immigrant Chronicle.

== Immigrant Chronicle ==
Immigrant Chronicle is a collection of poems by Peter Skrzynecki, remembering the experiences of his family as they immigrated from post-war Poland to Australia. The family, Peter Skrzynecki and his two parents, were in transit for over two years from 1949–51 (either physically travelling, or in a migrant hostel) before they were allowed to begin their new life in Australia. The book also expounds the ongoing hardships that Skrzynecki and his parents still suffer because of their journey to Australia. Immigrant Chronicle was one of the five prescribed "Physical Journeys" texts in the compulsory New South Wales HSC English syllabus, and was a prescribed poetry text for "Area of Study: Belonging" for 2009–14. This core text is the main focus of the unit, and it requires students to find their own related text(s) and compare the texts in the form of an essay.

Among the 48 poems included in Immigrant Chronicle are:

- 1. "Immigrants at Central Station, 1951"
- 2. "Feliks Skrzynecki"
- 6. "St Patrick's College"
- 8. "Ancestors"
- 17. "10 Mary Street"
- 33. "Crossing the Red Sea"
- 38. "Leaving home"
- 44. "Migrant hostel"
- 80. "Post Card"

== Bibliography ==
=== Poetry ===
- There, Behind the Lids (1970)
- Head-Waters (1972)
- Immigrant Chronicle (1975)
- The Aviary (1978)
- The Polish Immigrant (1982)
- Night Swim (1989)
- Easter Sunday (1993)
- Time's Revenge (2000)
- Old/New World (2007), selection from his previous eight books, plus the new collection Blood Plums
- Red Trees (2010)
- The Rainbow-birds and other poems (2016)

=== Novels ===
- The Beloved Mountain (1988)
- The Cry of the Goldfinch (1996)
- Boys of Summer (2010)

=== Memoir ===
- The Sparrow Garden (2004)
- Appointment Northwest (2014)

=== Criticism ===
- A Fiercer Light: A New Understanding of the Work of Judith Wright (2017; edited)

=== Short stories ===
- "The Wild Dogs" (1987)
- "Rock 'n' Roll Heroes" (1992)
