= 1952 in Australian literature =

This article presents a list of the historical events and publications of Australian literature during 1952.

== Events ==
- The Melbourne Science Fiction Club is formed on 9 May 1952, making it the oldest current sf club outside the USA.

== Books ==
- Martin Boyd – The Cardboard Crown
- Jon Cleary – The Sundowners
- Helen Fowler – The Shades Will Not Vanish
- T. A. G. Hungerford – The Ridge and the River
- Rex Ingamells – Of Us Now Living
- Philip Lindsay
  - The Merry Mistress
  - The Shadow of the Red Barn
- Charles Shaw – Heaven Knows, Mr. Allison
- Nevil Shute – The Far Country
- Christina Stead – The People with the Dogs
- E. V. Timms – The Challenge

== Short stories ==
- A. Bertram Chandler – "Finishing Touch"
- Peter Cowan – "The Red-Backed Spiders"
- D'Arcy Niland – "Away to Moonlight"
- Dal Stivens – "Ironbark Bill Meets the Bunyip"
- Kylie Tennant – "The Face of Despair"

== Crime and mystery ==
- Charlotte Jay — Beat Not the Bones
- Arthur Upfield – Venom House
- June Wright – The Devil's Caress

== Children's and Young Adult fiction ==
- Nan Chauncy – World's End was Home

== Poetry ==
- David Campbell
  - "Dance of Flame and Shadow : Hobo Chorus"
  - "Snow Gums"
- C. J. Dennis and Margaret Herron – Random Verse : A Collection of Verse and Prose
- Rosemary Dobson – "The Mirror : Jan Vermeer Speaks"
- R. D. Fitzgerald – Between Two Tides
- Max Harris – "Martin Buber in the Pub"
- James McAuley
  - "Invocation"
  - "Mating Swans"
- Kenneth Mackenzie
  - Australian Poetry 1951-1952
  - "The Snake"
  - "Two Trinities"
- Ian Mudie – "They'll Tell You about Me"
- Olive Pell – "Monte Bello"
- Vivian Smith – "Bedlam Hills"
- Douglas Stewart
  - "Marree"
  - Sun Orchids and Other Poems
- Judith Wright
  - "The Ancestors"
  - "Birds"
  - "Our Love is So Natural"

== Biography ==
- Russell Braddon – The Naked Island
- Frank Hardy – Journey Into the Future
- Jack McLaren – My Civilised Adventure
- Nettie Palmer – Henry Lawson

== Children's and Young Adult non-fiction ==
- Eve Pownall – The Australia Book, illustrated by Margaret Senior

== Drama ==
=== Radio ===
- Vance Palmer – Two Worlds

== Awards and honours ==
=== Literary ===
Award	Author	Title	Publisher
ALS Gold Medal	Tom Hungerford	The Ridge and the River	Angus and Robertson

=== Children's and Young Adult ===
Award	Category	Author	Title	Publisher
Children's Book of the Year Award	Older Readers	Eve Pownall, illustrated by Margaret Senior	The Australia Book	John Sands

=== Poetry ===
Award	Author	Title	Publisher
Grace Leven Prize for Poetry	R. D. Fitzgerald	Between Two Tides	Halstead Press

== Births ==
A list, ordered by date of birth (and, if the date is either unspecified or repeated, ordered alphabetically by surname) of births in 1952 of Australian literary figures, authors of written works or literature-related individuals follows, including year of death.

- 13 July – Kim Gamble, illustrator of children's books (died 2016)
- 9 November – Nicholas Jose, novelist

Unknown date

- Janine Burke, novelist
- Patricia Cornelius, playwright
- Wendy Jenkins, poet, editor and YA novelist (died 2022)
- Rod Moran, poet and journalist

== Deaths ==
A list, ordered by date of death (and, if the date is either unspecified or repeated, ordered alphabetically by surname) of deaths in 1952 of Australian literary figures, authors of written works or literature-related individuals follows, including year of birth.

- 14 January — Victor Kennedy, poet (born 1895)
- 13 June – Harold Mercer, poet (born 1882)
- 22 July – E. J. Brady, poet (born 1869)
- 29 August – J. M. Walsh, novelist (born 1897)
- 27 December— Patrick Joseph Hartigan, priest and poet (born 1878)

== See also ==
- 1952 in Australia
- 1952 in literature
- 1952 in poetry
- List of years in Australian literature
- List of years in literature
