= 1962 in Australian literature =

This article presents a list of the historical events and publications of Australian literature during 1962.

== Books ==
- James Aldridge – A Captive in the Land
- Thea Astley – The Well Dressed Explorer
- Martin Boyd – When Blackbirds Sing
- Nancy Cato – But Still the Stream
- Jon Cleary – The Country of Marriage
- Kenneth Cook – Chain of Darkness
- Dymphna Cusack – Picnic Races
- Catherine Gaskin – I Know My Love
- George Johnston – The Far Road
- Elizabeth Kata – Someone Will Conquer Them
- John Naish – The Cruel Field
- John O'Grady – Gone Fishin'
- Nancy Phelan – The River and the Brook
- E. V. Timms – The Big Country
- George Turner – The Cupboard Under the Stairs
- Arthur Upfield – The Will of the Tribe

== Short stories ==
- Thea Astley – "The Scenery Never Changes"
- Peter Cowan – "The Island"
- John Morrison – Twenty-Three : Stories
- Hal Porter
  - A Bachelor's Children : Short Stories
  - "A Double Because it's Snowing"
  - "First Love"
  - "Francis Silver"
- Patrick White
  - "Be Kind to Titina"
  - "The Letters"
  - "Willy-Wagtails by Moonlight"
- Amy Witting – "The Weight of a Man"

== Children's and Young Adult fiction ==
- Nan Chauncy – Half a World Away
- John Gunn – City in Danger
- Ruth Park
  - The Muddle-Headed Wombat
  - The Road Under the Sea
- Joan Phipson
  - The Boundary Riders
  - The Family Conspiracy
- Ivan Southall – Hills End
- P. L. Travers – Mary Poppins from A to Z
- Joan Woodberry – Rafferty Makes a Landfall
- Judith Wright – Range the Mountains High
- Patricia Wrightson – The Feather Star

== Poetry ==
- David Campbell – Poems
- Bruce Dawe
  - "Enter Without So Much as Knocking"
  - No Fixed Address : Poems
- Geoffrey Dutton – Flowers and Fury : Poems
- R. D. Fitzgerald – Southmost Twelve
- Rodney Hall – Penniless Till Doomsday
- Gwen Harwood – "The Wine is Drunk"
- Dorothy Hewett & Merv Lilley – What About the People!
- Oodgeroo Noonuccal – "Colour Bar"
- Roland Robsinson – Deep Well
- Douglas Stewart – Rutherford and Other Poems
- Randolph Stow
  - "The Land's Meaning"
  - Outrider : Poems, 1956-1962
- Francis Webb
  - "Harry"
  - "Pneumo-Encephalograph"
- Judith Wright – Birds : Poems

== Biography ==
- Joan Lindsay – Time Without Clocks
- Douglas Lockwood – I, the Aboriginal
- Alan Marshall – This is the Grass

== Non-fiction ==
- Manning Clark – The History of Australia (Vol. 1)
- F. J. Thwaites – Destination Spain (travel book)

== Drama ==
- Morris West – Daughter of Silence
- Patrick White – The Season at Sarsaparilla

== Awards and honours ==
=== Literary ===
Award	Author	Title	Publisher
ALS Gold Medal	Vincent Buckley	Masters in Israel	Angus and Robertson
Miles Franklin Award	Thea Astley	The Well Dressed Explorer	Angus and Robertson
Miles Franklin Award	George Turner	The Cupboard Under the Stairs	Cassell

=== Children and Young Adult ===
Award	Category	Author	Title	Publisher
Children's Book of the Year Award	Older Readers	L. H. Evers	The Racketty Street Gang	Hodder & Stoughton
Children's Book of the Year Award	Older Readers	Joan Woodberry	Rafferty Rides a Winner	M. Parrish, London
Children's Book of the Year Award	Picture Book	No award		

=== Poetry ===
Award	Author	Title	Publisher
Grace Leven Prize for Poetry	R. D. Fitzgerald	Southmost Twelve	Angus and Robertson

== Births ==
A list, ordered by date of birth (and, if the date is either unspecified or repeated, ordered alphabetically by surname) of births in 1962 of Australian literary figures, authors of written works or literature-related individuals follows, including year of death.

- 17 April — Joanna Murray-Smith, playwright

Unknown date

- Matthew Condon, novelist
- Alison Croggon, novelist
- Luke Davies, novelist
- Charmaine Papertalk Green, poet and artist (died 2025)
- Craig Sherborne, poet and playwright

== Deaths ==
A list, ordered by date of death (and, if the date is either unspecified or repeated, ordered alphabetically by surname) of deaths in 1962 of Australian literary figures, authors of written works or literature-related individuals follows, including year of birth.

- 4 February — Nita Kibble, librarian (born 1879)
- 8 March – Jean Devanny, novelist (born 1894)
- 9 September – H. M. Green, poet and critic (born 1881)
- 3 December – Mary Gilmore, poet (born 1865)

Unknown date

- Margaret Fane, novelist and poet (born 1887)

== See also ==
- 1962 in Australia
- 1962 in literature
- 1962 in poetry
- List of years in Australian literature
- List of years in literature
