= 1988 Queen's Birthday Honours (Australia) =

Awards list for Australia

The 1988 Queen's Birthday Honours for Australia were announced on Monday 13 June 1988 by the office of the Governor-General.

The Birthday Honours were appointments by some of the 16 Commonwealth realms of Queen Elizabeth II to various orders and honours to reward and highlight good works by citizens of those countries. The Birthday Honours are awarded as part of the Queen's Official Birthday celebrations during the month of June.

== Order of Australia ==
=== Companion (AC) ===
==== General Division ====
Recipient	Citation	Notes
David Greenberg Block, AO	For service to governments and government administration	
The Honourable Sir Francis Theodore Page Burt, KCMG	For service to the law and to the Crown	
The Right Honourable John Malcolm Fraser, CH	For service to the government and politics and to the Parliament of the Commonwealth of Australia	
The Right Honourable Sir John Grey Gorton, GCMG CH	For service to government and politics and to the Parliament of the Commonwealth of Australia	
Sir Brian (Scott) Inglis	For service to industry and technology	
Sir (Alexander George) William Keys, OBE MC	For service to the community, particularly to war veterans, war widows, and ex-service and service personnel	
James Frank Kirk, AO	For service to the community, particularly as Chairman of the Australian Bicentennial Authority	
Sir Sidney (Robert) Nolan, OM CBE	For service to the visual arts and to the advancement of art appreciation in Australia and overseas	
Dr Nanette Stacy Waddy, MBE	For service to medical education and to the community, particularly in the field of drug and alcohol abuse	

==== Military Division ====
Recipient	Citation	Notes
Prince Philip, Duke of Edinburgh, KG KT QSO	For service to the Australian Defence Force as Admiral of the Fleet in the Royal Australian Navy, Field Marshal in the Australian Army and Marshal of the Royal Australian Air Force	

=== Officer (AO) ===
==== General Division ====
Recipient	Citation	Notes
Lawrence James Adler	For service to the insurance industry and the community	
Donald Hector Aitken, ISO	For service to engineering and learning	
Robert David Eavestaff Bakewell	For public service	
Dr Marie Roslyn Bashir	For service to medicine, particularly in the field of adolescent mental health	
Alan Eric Blanckensee	For service to the community, religion and the legal profession	
Robert Francis Boylen	For service to the Public Service	
Ita Clare Buttrose, OBE	For service to the community, particularly in the fields of medical education and health care	
Emeritus Professor Denison Campbell-Allen	For service to education, particularly in the field of civil engineering	
Joan Maralyn Carden, OBE	For service to opera	
Lady Angela Diana Margaret Carrick	For service to the Girl Guides' Association of Australia	
Professor Ian Jeffrey Constable	For service to medicine, particularly in the field of ophthalmology	
Peter Francis Cox	For service to the NSW Parliament	
The Honourable Mervyn George Everett	For service to the Tasmanian Parliament, the law and for public service	
Collin William Martin Freeland	For public service	
Dorothy Green, OAM	For service to Australian literature, particularly as a writer, critic and teacher	
Donald Robert Hastie	For service to primary industry	
Donald Leslie Grant Hazelwood, OBE	For service to music	
Emeritus Professor Ronald Frank Henderson, CMG	For service to education, particularly in the fields of applied economic and social research	
Emeritus Professor Marjorie Grace Jacobs	For service to education, particularly in the field of Indian history	
His Honour Commodore Eric Eugene Johnston, AM OBE	For service to the Crown and to the people of the Northern Territory	
Monica Elizabeth Jolley	For service to Australian literature	
Caroline Mary Newman Jones	For service to the media	
Professor Douglas Joseph	For service to medicine, particularly in the field of Anaesthesia	
Dr Leslie Lazarus	For service to medicine, particularly in the field of medical research	
Emeritus Professor John David Legge	For service to education, particularly in the field of Asian studies, and to international relations	
James Bernard Maher	For service to the trade union movement	
Brian Patrick Martin	For service to secondary industry, particularly in the fields of urban development and housing	
Commissioner Ronald Peter McAulay, QPM	For public service, particularly with the Northern Territory Police Force	
Jean Middlemas McCaughey	For service to the community, particularly in the field of social welfare	
Dr George Roderick Cooper McLeod, RFD ED	For service to medicine, particularly in the field of surgery, and to the community	
Dr James McNulty	For service to medicine and to health administration	
George Molnar, OBE	For service to the arts, particularly as a cartoonist and to architecture	
John Vincent Monaghan	For public service	
Ronald Joseph Mulock	For service to the New South Wales Parliament	
Madeleine Betty Olle	For service to the community, particularly through the Union of Australian Women	
Lady Primrose Catherine Potter	For service to the arts and to the community	
Dr Alessandra Alberta Pucci	For service to the community, particularly in the field of biotechnology, and to industry	
John Charles Roberts	For service to the construction industry and to the sport of horse racing	
Dr Robert Clarence Robertson-Cuninghame	For service to learning as Chancellor of the University of New England	
Maxwell John Robinson, QPM	For public service, particularly with the Tasmanian Police Force and for service to the community	
The Right Reverend Kenneth Herbert Short	For service to religion, particularly as Anglican bishop of the Australian Defence Force	
David Edward Skillington	For service to engineering	
The Honourable Justice John Patrick Slattery	For service to the law	
Dr Brian William Smith	For service to post secondary education	
The Honourable William Andrew Noye Wells, QC	For service to the law, to legal scholarship and to education	
Rosemary Neville Wighton	For public service, for service to literature and to the community	
Graham Howitt Wilkinson	For service to journalism and to the community	

==== Military Division ====
Branch	Recipient	Citation	Notes
Navy	Rear Admiral Anthony Rockley Horton, AM	For service to the Royal Australian Navy, particularly as Chief of Naval Personnel	
Army	Major General Rodney Graham Fay	For service to the Army Reserve	
Army	Major General Philip Michael Jeffery, AM MC	For service to the Australian Army as Commander of the 1st Division	
Army	Major General William Orril Rodgers, OBE	For service to the Australian Army as Director General Army Health Services	
Air Force	Air Vice-Marshal Ian Barrington Gration, AFC	For service to the Royal Australian Air Force as Head of the Australian Defence Staff, Washington, USA	
Air Force	Air Vice-Marshal John Alan Paule, DSO AFC	For service to the Royal Australian Air Force as Assistant Chief of the Air Staff – Personnel	

=== Member (AM) ===
==== General Division ====
Recipient	Citation	Notes
Reverend Bruce Sidney Addison	For service to the community	
Dr Bernard John Amos	For service to medicine and to the development and delivery of health care services in Australia and Asia	
John Herbert Bails, DFC	For service to people with disabilities	
Thomas Raymond Baker	For service to the public service	
Milovan Alexander Banovich	For service to the community, particularly the Yugoslav community	
Dr Lindsay John Barker	For service to tertiary education	
Thomas Dwyer Bass	For service to the arts as a sculptor	
Francis William Bastow	For service to the trade union movement and to youth training and skills development	
Dr Robert William Beal, RFD	For service to medicine, particularly in the field of blood transfusion services	
Robert Gordon Becher	For service to industry, particularly in the field of industrial chemistry	
George Fitzhardinge Berkeley	For service to education	
George Neil Blaikie	For service to the community and journalism	
Fred Roy Blanks	For service to music	
Joy Brann	For service to nursing, particularly in the field of hospice care	
Eric Albert Bryce	For service to education	
David Zoltan Burger	For service to the community and to secondary industry	
James George Burnett, OBE	For service to the community and local government	
Elton Owen Burns	For service to agriculture	
Richard Edmund Butler	For service to the development of international telecommunications	
Dr Edmond Chiu	For service to medicine, particularly in furthering the understanding of Huntington's Disease	
Patrick Andrew Clohessy	For service to sport as a track and field coach	
Salvatore Coffa	For service to the sport of weightlifting and the community	
Kenneth Desmond Colbung, MBE	For service to the Aboriginal community	
Dr Peter John Crawford	For service to the Public Service	
Michael Jenkins Crouch	For service to the community and conservation	
Tommaso D'Orsogna	For service to the Italian community	
Robert Louis Dahlenburg	For service to industrial relations and to the community	
Dorothea Patricia Davies	For service to opera	
Peter John Doyle	For service to the fishing industry	
Ernest Charles Ecob	For service to the trade union movement	
Roy Maxwell Edwards	For service to primary industry and the community	
John Stanley Eggert	For service to the dairy industry	
Lady Mary Fairfax, OBE	For service to the community	
Janne Faulkner	For service to the arts, particularly as a designer	
Rodney Macpherson Fisher	For service to the performing arts as a director and writer	
Arthur Cameron Fitzgerald	For service to secondary industry and to the community	
Joseph Phillip French	For service to the sport of Rugby Union	
Lyall Peterie Fricker	For service to education	
Stanley Ronald Fry	For service to music	
Frederick Stuart Fry	For public service	
Wayne Michael Gardner	For service to the sport of motorcycle racing	
Terrence Stephen Gathercole	For service to the sport of swimming	
Anthony David Graham	For service to the sport of golf	
Commissioner Pauline Marcus Griffin	For service to industrial relations and to the community	
John Michael Haddad	For service to the tourism industry and to the community	
James Patrick Hall, BEM	For service to the welfare of veterans	
The Reverend Graham Wilberforce Hardy	For service to religion and to the community	
Ian Rainy Lance Harper	For service to the legal profession, business and the community	
Clifford Hawkins	For service to the real estate industry	
Leslie John Heil	For service to the media, particularly as a radio broadcaster	
Allen Henderson	For public service, particularly in the field of local government	
Donald Frank Holstock	For service to business and commerce, particularly in the retail motor trade	
Shirley Beverley Horne	For service to the community, particularly through the National Council of Women	
James Kentish Horwood	For service to secondary industry	
Maria Barbara Hrycek	For service to the Polish community	
Thomas Arthur Guy Hungerford	For service to literature	
James Bickford Jarvis	For service to local government and to the community	
Brian Crossley Jefferies	For service to primary industry	
Graeme George Kelleher	For public service particularly with the Great Barrier Reef Marine Park Authority	
Frederick John Edgar Kendall	For service to education and to the community	
Ian John Laslett	For service to secondary school education	
Dr Harris Keith Lewis	For service to the dental profession	
Brigadier Ian Hartridge Lowen, OBE ED RI	For service to the community	
Kathleen Anne Mathews	For service to nursing education	
Brian James McGuigan	For service to the wine and brandy industry and tourism	
Andrew Charles Collin Menzies, OBE	For public service	
Margaret Ann Millhouse	For service to the Girl Guides' Association of Australia	
Hans Mincham	For service to education as a writer, entomologist and palaeantologist	
Dr Francis Charles Neale	For service to medicine, particularly in the fields of biochemistry and pathology	
Robert Needham	For service to the mining industry, particularly gold mining	
Graham Norman Nock, OBE	For service to the community	
Ronald Alexander Orchard, QfsmQFSM	For service to the community, particularly as Chief Officer of the Victoria Country Fire Authority	
Ronald Edward Parry	For service to education	
Patricia Mary Peters	For service to athletics	
Professor David Herbert Pilgrim	For service to science, particularly in the field of hydrology	
John Pringle	For service to opera	
Dr Shirley Kaye Randell	For public service, particularly in the field of education	
Ruby May Robinson, MBE	For service to women's hockey	
William Frederick Rolston	For public service, particularly as Auditor General for Western Australia	
Brenda Joyce Rossmann	For service to business and commerce, particularly in the encouragement of small businesses	
James Newton Russell, MBE	For service to the arts as a cartoonist	
Dr Joseph Anthony Scanlon	For service to the community and to medicine	
Giovanni (John) Scomparin	For service to the community, particularly the Italian community	
John Franklin Scown	For service to pharmacy	
Richard Lloyd Senior	For service to education	
John Percival Simons	For service to conservation	
Philip John Smyth	For service to basketball	
Gavin Geoffrey Souter	For service to literature and journalism	
Geoffrey Thomas Stilwell	For service to education and to the State Library of Tasmania	
Elsie Margaret Stones, MBE	For service to art as an illustrator of botanical specimens	
Basil Taliangis	For service to the Greek community	
James Tehan	For service to the community and agriculture	
Charles John Thompson	For public service, particularly as Australian Government Printer	
Dermot Joseph Tiernan	For service to local government and the community	
The Honourable John Varnum	For service to industrial relations	
John Robert Maxwell Walters, MBE	For service to the community	
Alison Gene Wenham	For service to youth	
Yvonne Margaret Winter	For service to nursing	
Kenneth Frank Woolley	For service to architecture	

==== Military Division ====
Branch	Recipient	Citation	Notes
Navy	Commodore John Spencer Compton	For service to the Royal Australian Navy, particularly as the Hydrographer Royal Australian Navy	
Navy	Commander Kenneth Arthur Swain	For service to the Royal Australian Navy as Staff Officer 75th Anniversary Programme	
Navy	Captain Brian Lawrence Swan	For service to the Royal Australian Navy, as Director Naval Service Conditions	
Army	Lieutenant Colonel Robin David Letts, MC	For service to the Australian Army as the Director of Operation Raleigh Australia	
Army	Colonel Terry John Lunney, RFD	For service to the Australian Army as Commanding Officer of 42nd Battalion, The Royal Queensland Regiment	
Army	Major Joseph Thomas O'Reilly	For service to the Australian Army with 2nd/14th Light Horse (Queensland Mounted Infantry)	
Army	Brigadier Kenneth Roy Phillips	For service to the Australian Army as Deputy Assistant Chief of the General Staff Personnel	
Army	Brigadier Graeme Benjamin Standish, RFD ED	For service to the Australian Army as the Commander 3rd Training Group	
Army	Colonel Lachlan Armstrong Thomson	For service to the Australian Army as Defence Attaché, Bangkok	
Army	Lieutenant Colonel Neil Harvey Weekes, MC	For service to the Australian Army as the Commanding Officer of North West Mobile Force	
Air Force	Squadron Leader Daryl Robert Brown	For service to the Royal Australian Air Force as Systems Manager for the procurement for a computerised maintenance system	
Air Force	Squadron Leader Gordon William Browne	For service to the Royal Australian Air Force as Trials Manager of the Jindalee Air Defence Trial	
Air Force	Group Captain John Joseph Dainer	For service to the Royal Australian Air Force as a Reserve Legal Officer	
Air Force	Squadron Leader Garry Noel Long	For service to the Royal Australian Air Force as a Senior Catering Officer, RAAF Base Williamtown	
Air Force	Squadron Leader Stephen John Richards	For service to the Royal Australian Air Force as Facilities Liaison Officer, RAAF Base Tindal	
Air Force	Wing Commander Peter Anthony White	For service to the Royal Australian Air Force in the Medical Branch Laboratory Category	

=== Medal (OAM) ===
==== General Division ====
Recipient	Citation	Notes
Ernest Harry Alderslade	For services to band music	
Ellen Jane Allan	For services to nursing	
Harold Alby Almond	For service to the community as co-founder of Solace	
Jean Ann Almond	For service to the community as co-founder of Solace	
Jessie Atkinson	For service to the community	
Benjamin Paul Atkinson	For service to the community	
Keith Alexander Bain	For service to the performing arts	
Margot Noelle Ballard	For service to nursing, particularly new-born child care	
James Leonard Banks	For service to the Public Service	
John Charles Banks	For service to community welfare	
Isobel Aitken Barr	For service to the Public Service	
Geoffrey Douglas Barton	For service to the community	
Leonard Beadell, BEM	For service to the Public service and to literature	
Max Bevilaqua	For service to the Australian Red Cross Society	
Judith Blake	For service to youth	
Joyce Phyllis Bonwick	For service to athletics administration	
Stuart Roy Brookes	For service to bushwalking	
Phyllis Florence Butterfield	For service to the community	
Joseph William Cahill	For service to the trade union movement and the community	
Gordon William Chaffer	For services to the community	
Alan Goode Chapman	For service to primary industry education programmes	
Mary Bethune Clapp	For service to the community through the Toorak Auxiliary	
Constance Grace Clarke	For service to the hearing impaired	
Gordon John Clarke	For service to conservation	
Councillor Robert John Comini	For service to the community and local government	
Dennis Robert Conlin	For service to surf lifesaving	
Marjory Craig	For service to the disabled	
Shirley Graeme Cresp	For service to children with intellectual disabilities	
Joy Mary Croft	For service to marine safety	
Norma Grace Crump	For service to the Aboriginal community	
Margaret Joy Cunningham	For service to the community	
Dr Jean Blossom Currie	For service to the Public Service	
Keith Edward Ernest Curry	For service to music in schools	
The Reverend Father Patrick Austin Day	For service to religion	
John David Dedrick	For service to the sport of Rugby Union	
Jack Deeble, VRD	For service to the community and to scouting	
Joseph Lynch Doherty	For service to the trade union movement	
Michael Kevin Doherty	For service to the community of Geelong	
Colin Douglas Doig	For service to the welfare of veterans	
Joseph Harry Dows	For service to youth, particularly Naval Reserve Cadets	
Spero Miltiades Dragona	For service to the visually impaired	
Dimitri Efstratiades	For service to the Greek community	
Marcia Lynne Ella	For service to the sport of netball	
Laurence Roger Farrelly	For service to youth	
Patricia Maria Fin	For service to the Italian community	
John Collins Finn	For service to community sport	
Eula Roberta Therese Fleay	For service to the sport of horse riding	
Enzo Alido Floreani	For service to the community	
King Moo Fong	For service to the Chinese community	
Clarence Percival Foster	For service to the community	
Eileen Alison Shard Gemmell-Smith	For service to the Karitane Mothercraft Society	
Jack Arthur Gibson	For service to the sport of Rugby League as a coach	
Leonard Thomas William Giltrow	For service to hockey	
John Lloyd Gould	For service to the community	
Douglas Keith Grant	For service to local government and to the community	
Kathleen Mary Patricia Gray	For service to the community and to the University of Western Australia	
Joseph Munro Hall	For service to the community	
Marie Dawn Halls	For service to the Aboriginal community	
James Stuart Hamilton	For service to literature	
Maxwell Hanrahan	For service to local government	
Francis Henry Healy	For service to the community, particularly through the Lions Club and through surf life saving	
John Hedges	For service to the community, particularly in the care of the elderly	
Bayro Helich	For service to the Yugoslav community	
Winifred Myra Hilgendorf	For service through art programmes to people with intellectual disabilities	
Dr Jack Hoffman	For service to the community, particularly through the Lions Eye Institute	
David Marriott Horsford	For service to surf life saving	
Francis Patrick Howley	For services to youth sport	
Robert Jeffrey Hunter	For service to country fire and emergency services	
Peter Hupalo	For service to the Ukrainian community	
Nance Janet Irvine	For service to literature	
Mavis Edna Jackson	For service to the community and to local government	
Mervyn Norman John Jenkins	For service to people with physical disabilities	
Bernice Ruth Jenkins	For service to the community	
Marcia Jerath	For service to international relations	
Harold Reginald Johnson	For service to conservation	
Mary May Kellow, ED	For service to nursing	
Eileen Veronica Kelly	For service to the community, particularly women	
George Johnson Kemp	For service to the welfare of veterans	
Arthur George Stanislaus Kent	For services to the St John Ambulance Brigade and to the community	
Leona Evelyn Kitson	For service to people with visual impairment	
Clements Benno Kleinig	For public service	
Darcy Vivian Edwin Lang	For service to dentistry	
Ralf Langen-Zueff	For service to the community	
Alice May Lemon	For service to the community	
Ian Little	For service to industrial relations and trade skills	
Karel Wolrad Lohning	For service to engineering and welding engineering and welding engineering education	
Lyndon William John Longmire	For service to local government	
Vernon Hordern Lumby	For service to the community	
Lola Joy Lundy	For service to the community, particularly through the Country Women's Association of Western Australia	
Charlotte Macdonald	For service to the War Widows' Guild of Western Australia	
Elizabeth Edith Macdonald	For service to the community, particularly the Australia Day Council of Queensland	
Elaine Gladys Macfarlane	For service as a teacher of physical education, to young people with intellectual disabilities	
Kathleen Claire Mack	For service to the community, particularly the Aboriginal community	
Lieutenant Colonel James Edwin Madden	For service to the community in the Australian Capital Territory	
John Dion Maddox	For service to secondary education	
Margaret Louise Mahony	For service to athletics	
Robert Mann	For service to the sugar industry and to the community	
John Daniel Marchingo	For service to band music	
The Reverend Father Athanasios Marinakis	For service to the Greek community	
Reginald Francis Edgell Mason	For service to the community, band music and international relations	
Anna Matthews	For service to the Greek community	
Elizabeth Maud McBriar	For service to conservation and the environment	
George Thomson McKenzie	For service to youth	
Ronald McNally	For service to the community and to local government	
Annemieke Mein	For service to the arts, particularly in textile sculptures and bronze bas-relief sculptures	
Gino Antonio Merlo	For service to the community	
Frank Osborne Moorhouse	For service to the community	
William Thomas Morck	For service to the community	
Major Hugh Gordon Munro	For service to primary industry	
Ethel Avis Neeld	For service to the community	
Thomas Wyndham Newman	For service to the development of Neighbourhood Watch Programmes	
Father John Joseph Newman	For service to the community and to the Army Reserve	
Tan Hai Nguyen	For service to the Vietnamese community	
Cornelius Patrick Denis O'Sullivan	For service to primary industry	
Phillip Patrick O'Toole	For service to the trade union movement	
Noel William Rowe Payten	For service to local government	
Wayne John Pearce	For service to rugby league	
Robert William Piconi	For service to the community	
Wolfie Simson Pizem	For service to tourism	
Fay Elizabeth Powles	For service to the Royal Society for the Prevention of Cruelty to Animals in the Australian Capital Territory and to the community	
Barry Ewen Presgrave	For service to the community, particularly youth	
Gordon Alfred Presland, BEM	For service to the community	
John Joseph Puddephatt	For service to the community and to veterans	
Valentine James Pyers	For service to music, particularly as director and administrator of the Melbourne Chorale	
Iris Dryden Rains	For service to the Aboriginal community	
John Charles Reid	For service to conservation, the environment and to local government	
Bryce Harold Rogers	For service to the Army Corps	
James Rogers-Rudnik	For service to the Polish community	
John Basil Salvaris	For service to the Greek community	
Margaret Jean Schofield (Cochrane)	For service to music and to the community	
Thelma Louise Schrader	For service to art	
Charles Tsang See-Kee	For service to the community	
Margaret Senior	For service to wildlife conservation	
Thomas Peter Seres	For service to contract bridge	
Maria-Luisa Sheehan	For service to the community, particularly to women and to migrants	
Norma Mary Sims	For service to the Girl Guides' Association	
Ernest Edwin Sly	For service to the community, particularly the rehabilitation of drug addicts and alcoholics	
Patricia Mary Sorby	For service to the community	
George William Sparnon	For service to local government and to the community	
Jillian Mary Statton	For service to the South Australian Genealogy and Heraldry Society	
Geoffrey James Swan	For service to special education for children with physical and intellectual disabilities	
Joan Ethel Talbot	For service to the community	
Nowell Boyd Taylor	For service to the community	
Edna May Thiele	For service to the Association of Civilian Widows	
Margaret Frances Titmus	For service to music, particularly the Devonport Choral Society	
Shafik Salim Torbey	For service to the Lebanese community	
Reta Karm-Nishan Trebilcock	For service to women's lawn bowls	
Frank Vana, BEM	For service to the Czechoslovak community	
Wilhelmus Vrolyks	For service to soccer	
Walter Ronald Walsh	For service to local government and to the community	
James Thomas Walsh	For service to small business and to the community	
Una Maud (Eunice) Watson	For public service	
Ross Herbert Watson	For service to veterans	
Frank William Watters	For service to art	
Edgar George Webster	For service to the community	
Edward James Weeks, RFD	For service to youth and to the Australian Cadet Corps	
Betty Rutherford Westwood	For service to conservation	
Albert James Winter	For service to the community	
William Dennis Wivell	For service to the community	
Dennis Wolanski	For service to the arts	
Thomas Edward Yates	For service to the Victorian Railways	
Dudley Gordon Young	For service to the community and to veterans	

==== Military Division ====
Branch	Recipient	Citation	Notes
Navy	Warrant Officer Rodney Norman Baker	For service to the Royal Australian Navy as Deputy Sea Training Co-ordinator for the RAN Submarine Squadron	
Navy	Warrant Officer Ricki Leigh Burridge	For service to the Royal Australian Navy in gaining Civil Trade recognition for Royal Australian Naval Cooks	
Navy	Chief Petty Officer Noel Richard Hillier	For service to the Royal Australian Navy as the Galley Manager, HMAS Watson	
Navy	Warrant Officer Christopher Hugh O'Donnell	For service to the Royal Australian Navy as Naval Stores Officer HMAS Stirling	
Navy	Warrant Officer Gordon Arnold Rothe	For service to the Royal Australian Navy as the Defence Administrative Assistant at the Australian Embassy, Manilla, Philippines	
Navy	Warrant Officer Kim Oliver Staples	For service to the Royal Australian Navy as Parade and Ceremonial Training Officer, HMAS Cerberus	
Army	Warrant Officer Class Two Tomislav Arnautovic	For service to the Australian Army as Battery Sergeant Major 7th Field Battery, Royal Regiment of Australian Artilliary	
Army	Warrant Officer Class One Daniel Augustine Connolly	For service to the Australian Army in the field of communications system planning and installation	
Army	Corporal Leigh Anne Dunn	For services to the Australian Army as Orderly to the Chief of Army Lodistics	
Army	Warrant Officer Class One Richard Manfred Feverbach	For service to the Australian Army as the WO Supply with the Air Transport Squadron, Papua New Guinea Defence Force	
Army	Captain Terence John Kelly	For service to the Australian Army as the Administration officer in Depot Company, Royal Australian Regiment, Infantry Centre	
Army	Warrant Officer Class One John Henry McKay	For service to the Australian Army as the Regimental Duties Warrant Officer, Headquarters 6th Brigade	
Army	Warrant Officer Class Two Harold James O'Brien	For service to the Australian Army as the Quartermaster Sergeant of the 51st Battalion, the Far North Queensland Regiment	
Army	Warrant Officer Class Two Gordon Paul O'Brien	For service to the Australian Army as the Supervisor of Physical and Recreational Training in the Kapooka Military District	
Army	Warrant Officer Class One Terrence O'Farrell	For service to the Australian Army as Regimental Sergeant Major of the Special Air Service Regiment	
Army	Warrant Officer Class One John Lance Parfitt	For service to the Army Reserve in Queensland	
Army	Warrant Officer Class One Dane Roberts	For service to the Australian Army as the Sergeant Major 33rd Field Dental Unit, Royal Australian Army Dental Corps	
Army	Warrant Officer Class Two Neville Gordon Thompson	For service to the Australian Army in the field of Supply Management	
Air Force	Flight Sergeant Peter Charles Frederick Coupland	For service to the Royal Australian Air Force in the Directorate General Material Projects	
Air Force	Warrant Officer Bruce Hinchcliffe	For service to the Royal Australian Air Force in the Directorate of Administrative Development Air Force	
Air Force	Warrant Officer Darryl Hooper	For service to the Royal Australian Air Force as an instructor on the F111c aircrew transit maintenance.	
Air Force	Warrant Officer Jean Maureen Kerr	For service to the Royal Australian Air Force as Mess Supervisor, Officers Mess, Base Squadron, Darwin	
Air Force	Flight Sergeant Malvern Leonard Levi Maslen	For service to the Royal Australian Air Force as the Senior Non-Commissioned Officer-in-Charge of the Police Dog Handler Section, Administrative Support Squadron, Richmond	
Air Force	Warrant Officer John Francis Mccosker	For service to the Royal Australian Air Force as a Loadmaster Instructor at No 37 Squadron, Richmond	
Air Force	Warrant Officer John Craig Shearwin	For service to the Royal Australian Air Force as Aircraft Tasking Co-ordinator at No 492 Maintenance Squadron, Edinburgh	
Air Force	Warrant Officer Howard Rex Wittwer	For service to the Royal Australian Air Force as an Avionics System Technician at Aircraft Research and Development Unit, Edinburgh	
