= 1962 in poetry =

Nationality words link to articles with information on the nation's poetry or literature (for instance, Irish or France).

== Events ==
- May 30 – Composer Benjamin Britten's War Requiem, incorporating settings of Wilfred Owen's poems, is premièred for the consecration of the new Coventry Cathedral.
- September – Ted Hughes and Sylvia Plath separate.
- October
  - Beginning this month, Sylvia Plath experiences a great burst of creativity, writing most of the poems on which her reputation will rest in what will be the last few months of her life, including many which will be published in Ariel and Winter Trees.
  - Dame Edith Sitwell reads from her poetry at a concert at Royal Festival Hall in London given in honor of her 75th birthday.
- Writers in the Soviet Union this year are allowed to publish criticism of Joseph Stalin and are given more freedom generally, although many are severely criticized for doing so. The poet Yevgeny Yevtushenko, in the poem, The Heirs of Stalin, writes that more guards should be placed at Stalin's tomb, "lest Stalin rise again, and with Stalin the past". He also condemns anti-Semitism in the Soviet Union. His poetry readings attract hundreds and thousands of enthusiastic young people, to the point where police are often summoned to preserve order and disperse the crowds long after midnight. Other young poets also go beyond the previous limits of Soviet censorship: Andrei Voznesensky, Robert Rozhdestvensky, and Bella Akhmadulina (who has divorced Yevtushenko). Aleksandr Tvardovsky, editor of the literary monthly Novy Mir, supports many of the young writers. By the end of the year, the young writers have gained power in the official writers' unions which control much of the literary culture of the Soviet Union, and some publications which had attacked them are printing their work. American poet Robert Frost visits Russian poet Anna Akhmatova in her dacha.
- Michigan Quarterly Review is founded.

== Works published in English ==
Listed by nation where the work was first published and again by the poet's native land, if different; substantially revised works listed separately:

=== Australia ===
- Bruce Dawe, "Enter Without So Much as Knocking"
- R. D. Fitzgerald, Southmost Twelve
- Dorothy Hewett & Merv Lilley, What About the People!
- Randolph Stow, "The Land's Meaning"
- Chris Wallace-Crabbe, Eight Metropolitan Poems, Adelaide: Australian Letters
- Francis Webb, "Harry"

=== Canada ===
- Earle Birney, Ice Cod Bell or Stone. Toronto: McClelland and Stewart.
- Wilson MacDonald, *Pugwash. Toronto: Pine Tree Publishing.
- John Newlove, The Things which Are
- Al Purdy, Poems for All the Annettes
- James Reaney, Twelve Letters to a Small Town. Governor General's Award 1962.
- A. J. M. Smith, Collected Poems
- F. R. Scott, St-Denys Garneau & Anne Hebert: Translations/Traductions. Translated by F. R. Scott. Vancouver: Klanak Press.
- Raymond Souster, A Local Pride. Toronto: Contact Press.
- Raymond Souster, Place of Meeting
- Wilfred Watson, The Sea is Also a Garden

==== Anthologies ====
- Irving Layton, editor, Love Where the Nights Are Long
- Editors of the Tamarack Review, a selection from its past issues, The First Five Years, including poetry

==== Biography, criticism and scholarship ====
- John Glassco, The Journal of Hector de Saint-Denys Garneau (translation)
- Canadian critics and poets, Masks of Poetry

=== India, in English ===
- Adil Jussawalla, Land's End ( Poetry in English ), Calcutta: Writers Workshop, India.
- Lawrence Bantleman, Graffiti ( Poetry in English ), Calcutta: Writers Workshop, India.
- M. P. Bhaskaran, The Dancer and the Ring ( Poetry in English ), Calcutta: Writers Workshop, India.

=== United Kingdom ===
- Dannie Abse, Poems, Golders Green, including "The Abandoned", London: Hutchinson
- George Barker, The View From a Blind I
- Edmund Blunden, A Hong Kong House
- Ronald Bottrall, Collected Poems
- Tony Connor, With Love Somehow, London: Oxford University Press
- Patrick Creagh, A Row of Pharaohs
- Allen Curnow, A Small Room with Large Windows (Oxford University Press), selected poems by this New Zealand poet published in the United Kingdom
- C. Day-Lewis, The Gate, including "Not Proven" and "The Disabused"
- T. S. Eliot, Collected Poems 1909–1962
- D. J. Enright, Addictions, London: Chatto and Windus with Hogarth Press
- Roy Fuller, Collected Poems 1936-1961, London: André Deutsch
- Robert Graves, New Poems 1962
- Thom Gunn, Fighting Terms, a revision of a collection from the 1950s including "My Sad Captains"
- Thom Gunn and Ted Hughes, Selected poems by Thom Gunn and Ted Hughes, Faber
- Richard Kell, Control Tower
- Thomas Kinsella, Downstream, Irish poet published in the United Kingdom
- Peter Levi, Water, Rock and Sand
- Norman MacCaig, A Round of Applause, London: Chatto and Windus with Hogarth Press
- Christopher Middleton, Torse 3
- Ewart Milne, A Garland for the Green, Irish poet published in the UK
- Vernon Scannell, A Sense of Danger
- Dame Edith Sitwell, The Outcasts
- Stevie Smith, Selected Poems
- Jon Stallworthy, Out of Bounds
- R. S. Thomas, The Bread of Truth
- Anthony Thwaite, The Owl in the Tree
- J. R. R. Tolkien, The Adventures of Tom Bombadil, and Other Verses from the 'Red Book'
- Charles Tomlinson, A Peopled Landscape
- Derek Walcott, In a Green Night the "most striking" first collection of poetry of 1962, according to Howard Sergeant, editor of Outposts (writing for publication in 1963). Walcott had already gained recognition with his plays.
- Vernon Watkins, Affinities
- T. H. White, Verses

==== Anthologies ====
- Al Alvarez, editor, The New Poetry an anthology that provoked controversy with its omissions and inclusions
- James Reeves, editor, Georgian Poetry

=== United States ===
- Brother Antoninus (William Everson), The Hazards of Holiness, 1957-1960, Garden City, New York: Doubleday
- John Ashbery, The Tennis Court Oath
- Robert Bly, Silence in the Snowy Fields, Middletown, Connecticut: Wesleyan University Press
- Kay Boyle, Collected Poems
- Gregory Corso, Long Live Man
- Robert Creeley, For Love: Poems 1950-1960, collected lyrics from his seven previous volumes, New York: Scribner's
- James Dickey, Drowning With Others
- William Faulkner, Prose and Poetry, fiction, nonfiction, verse
- Ian Hamilton Finlay, The Dancers Inherit the Party, 2nd edition, Ventura California and Worcester, England: Migrant Press, Scottish poet publishing in the United States
- Robert Frost, In the Clearing, his first collection of new poems in 15 years
- Paul Goodman, The Lordly Hudson: Collected Poems, New York: Macmillan
- Robert Hayden, A Ballad of Remembrance
- John Hollander, Movie-Going and Other Poems
- Richard Howard, Quantities
- Weldon Kees, Collected Poems, published posthumously (poet disappeared 1955)
- Kenneth Koch, Thank You and Other Poems
- Denise Levertov, The Jacob's Ladder
- Hugh MacDiarmid, Collected Poems, New York: Macmillan, Scottish poet publishing in the United States
- Norman Mailer, Deaths for the Ladies
- James Merrill, Water Street
- W. S. Merwin, The Life of Lazarillo de Tormes
- Christopher Middleton, torse 3, New York: Harcourt, Brace
- Vladimir Nabokov, Pale Fire, novel purporting to be a critical edition of a poem of this title written by the (fictional) American poet John Shade
- Ogden Nash, Everyone But Thee and Me, light verse
- Howard Nemerov, The Next Room of the Dream, University of Chicago Press
- Sylvia Plath, The Colossus and Other Poems, 1st U.S. edition, New York: Alfred A. Knopf, American poet resident in the United Kingdom
- Charles Reznikoff, By the Waters of Manhattan: Selected Verse
- David Ross, Three Ages of Lake Light, his first book of poems
- Muriel Rukeyser, Waterlily Fire: Poems 1935-1962,
- James Schevill, Private Dooms and Public Destinations: Poems 1945-1962, Denver: Alan Swallow
- Winfield Townley Scott, Collected Poems
- Anne Sexton, All My Pretty Ones, including "The Truth the Dead Know", Boston: Houghton Mifflin
- Edith Shiffert, In Open Woods, her first book of poems
- William Stafford, Traveling Through the Dark, New York: Harper & Row
- Diane Wakoski, Coins and Coffins
- Theodore Weiss, Gunsight, New York University Press
- Reed Whittemore, The Boy from Iowa
- William Carlos Williams, Pictures from Brueghel and Other Poems

==== Criticism, scholarship and biography in the United States ====
- Hugh Kenner, editor, T. S. Eliot: A Collection of Critical Essays (Prentice-Hall), Canadian writing published in the United States
- Karl Shapiro, Prose Keys to Modern Poetry

=== Other in English ===
- Eavan Boland, 23 Poems, Ireland
- Ewart Milne, A Garland for the Green, Irish poet published in the UK
- Kendrick Smithyman, Inheritance, New Zealand

== Works published in other languages ==
Listed by language and often by nation where the work was first published and again by the poet's native land, if different; substantially revised works listed separately:

=== French language ===
==== Canada, in French ====
- Gérard Bessette, Poèmes temporels
- Gilles Hénault, Sémaphore

==== France ====
- Yves Bonnefoy, Anti-Platon, France
- André du Bouchet, Dans la chaleur vacante
- René Char, La Parole en archipel
- Jean Cocteau, La Requiem
- Jean-Paul de Dadelsen, Jonas, published posthumously (died 1957)
- Pierre Emmanuel, Evangéliaire
- André Frénaud, Il n'y a pas de paradis
- Jean Follain, Poèmes et Pros choisis, displaying some similarities to haiku
- Jean Grosjean, Apocalypse
- Pierre Jean Jouve, Moires
- Stéphane Mallarmé, Pour un tombeau d'Anatole, an abandoned and previously unpublished work, consisting of notes and drafts of an elegy the poet expected to write on his dead son (posthumous); edited by J. P. Richard
- Robert Marteau, Royaumes
- Henri Michaux, Vents et poussières, Paris: Flinker
- Saint-John Perse:
  - Hommage à Rabindranath Tagore, Liège: Editions Dynamo
  - L'ordre des oiseaux, Paris: Société d'Éditions d'art; republished as Oiseaux, Paris: Société d'Éditions d'art
  - Valéry Larbaud; ou, L'Honneur littéraire, Liège: Editions Dynamo
- Marcelin Pleynet, Provisoires Amants des nègres
- Francis Ponge, Le Grand Recueil in three volumes
- Jean Claude Renard:
  - Incantation du temps
  - Incantation des eaux
- Michel Sager, XXI poèmes nocturnes

===== Criticism and scholarship =====
- J. P. Richard, L'Univers imaginaire de Mallarmé

=== Germany ===
- G. Benn, Lyrik des expressionistischen Jahrzehnts, anthology
- Johannes Bobrowski, Schattenland Ströme (Shadowland), East Germany
- Marie Luise Kaschnitz, Dein Schweigen-meine Stimmen
- Hilde Domin, Rückkehr der Schiffe
- Wilhelm Lehmann, Abschiedslust, Gedichte aus den Jahren 1957-1961, 37 poems
- Hans Magnus Enzensberger, Viele schöne Kinderreime, 777 poems for children

=== Hebrew ===
- Anonymous author from the Soviet Union, Zion Halo Tishali, poems originally written in Russian and clandestinely sent to Israel, edited and translated by A. Shlonsky and M. Sharett
- Avigdor Hameiri, Belivnat ha-Sapir ("Clear-cut Sapphire"), collected poems
- Levi Ben-Amittai, Matana Mimidbar ("Gift of the Desert")
- Yitzahak Ogen, Shirim ("Poems")
- P. Elad-Lander, Ke'raiah ha-Sadeh ("As the Fragrance of the Field")
- A. Halfi, Mul Kohavim ve-Afar ("Against Stars and the Dust")
- A. Meyrowitz, Avnai Bait ("Stones of a House")
- D. Avidan, Shirai Lahatz ("Poems of Pressure")
- Uri Bernstein, Beoto ha-Heder Beoto ha-Or ("In the Same Room, In the Same Light")
- T. Carmi, Nehash ha-Nehoshet ("Brass Serpent")
- J. Lichtenbaum, Shiratenu ("Our Poetry"), a two-volume anthology of Hebrew poetry from the end of the 18th century
- J. J. Schwartz, Kentucky, the only volume of Hebrew poetry published in the United States, according to The Britannica Book of the Year 1963 (covering events of 1962)

=== India ===
Listed in alphabetical order by first name:

- Barnardino Evaristo Mendes, also known as B. E. Mendes, Goenchem Git, Konkani
- Gulzar, Jaanam, New Delhi: Vanagi Publications; Urdu
- Maheswar Neog, Asamiya Sahityar Ruprekha, Assamese-language
- Ratnadhwaj Josi, Hamro Kavya Paramparama Usaiko Lagi ("Our Poetic Tradition"), criticism, Nepali

=== Italy ===
- A. Gatto, Carlomagno nella grotta
- Eugenio Montale, Satura, published in a private edition, Verona: Oficina Bodoni
- Cesare Pavese, Poesie edite e inedite, edited by Italo Calvino, Turin: Einaudi (posthumous)
- Maria Luisa Spaziani, Il gong
- P. Volponi, Memoriale

=== Spanish language ===
==== Latin America ====
- Roque Dalton, El mar and El turno del ofendido (Salvadoran poet published in Cuba)
- Alaíde Foppa, Aunque es de noche ("Although it's Night") (Guatemalan poet published in Mexico)
- Héctor Rojas Herazo, Mascando las tinieblas en el odio (Colombia)
- Alberto Hidalgo, Historia peruana verdadera
- José Martí, Versos (Cuban), posthumous; with an introduction by Eugenio Florit
- Pablo Neruda, a bilingual anthology of his selected verse; with an introduction by Louis Monguió
- Rubén Bonifaz Nuño, Fuego de pobres (Mexico)
- Carlos Pellicer, Material poético (Mexico)

==== Spain ====
- Jorge Guillén, Lenguaje y poesía
- A collaboration of 50 poets and 14 illustrators, Versos para Antonio Machado (published in France)

=== Yiddish ===
- Elia Levita, Bovo-bukh ("Buovo d'Antona") (posthumous) a 16th-century epic poem translated into modern Yiddish by Moyshe Knapheys
- Jacob Glatstein, Di freyd fun yidishn vort (The Joy of the Yiddish World)
- Noyekh Yitskhok Gotlib, a book of poetry
- Chaim Grade, Der mench fun fayer ("The Man of Fire")
- Rachel Korn, a book of poetry
- Kadia Molodowsky, editor, Lider fun khurbn ("Poems of the Catastrophe"), an anthology in which emphasized the theme of the Holocaust
- Shlomo Shenhod, a book of poetry
- Abraham Nahum Stencl, a book of poetry
- I. J. Schwartz, a book of poetry
- I. Taubes, a book of poetry
- Meir Ziml Tkatch, a book of poetry
- Shneyer Vaserman, a book of poetry
- Avrom Zak, a book of poetry
- Rajzel Żychlińsky, a book of poetry

=== Other ===
- Bella Akhmadulina, Struna ("The String"), Soviet Union
- Ruy de Moura Belo, O problema da habitação—alguns aspectos ("The Quandary of Living: Some Aspects'", Portugal
- Inger Christensen, Lys: digte ("Light"), Denmark
- Wisława Szymborska: Sól ("Salt"), Poland

== Awards and honors ==
=== Australia ===
- Grace Leven Prize for Poetry: R. D. Fitzgerald, Southmost Twelve

=== United Kingdom ===
- Eric Gregory Award: Donald Thomas, James Simmons, Brian Johnson, Jenny Joseph
- Queen's Gold Medal for Poetry: Christopher Fry

=== United States ===
- Bollingen Prize: John Hall Wheelock and Richard Eberhart
- National Book Award for Poetry: Alan Dugan, Poems
- Pulitzer Prize for Poetry: Alan Dugan: Poems
- Fellowship of the Academy of American Poets: John Crowe Ransom
- Yale Series of Younger Poets Competition: Jack Gilbert: Monolithos

=== Awards in other nations ===
- Grand Prix National des Lettres (France): Pierre Jean Jouve
- Grand prix de littérature de l'Académie française (France): Luc Estang, for his work as a whole
- Australia: Grace Leven Prize for Poetry, Southmost Twelve, R. D. Fitzgerald
- Canada: Governor General's Award, poetry or drama: Twelve Letters to a Small Town and The Winter Sun and Other Plays, James Reaney
- Canada: Governor General's Award, Poésie et théâtre: Les insolites et les violons de l'automne, Jacques Languirand

== Births ==
- May 11 – Joko Pinurbo (died 2024), Indonesian poet
- May 13 – Kathleen Jamie, Scottish poet and essayist
- May 21 – Stacy Doris (died 2012), American poet writing in English and French
- May 30 – Elizabeth Alexander, American poet
- June 9 – Paul Beatty, African-American poet and author
- June 25 – Phill Jupitus, born Phillip Swan, English comedian and performance poet
- July 30 – Lavinia Greenlaw, English poet, librettist and fiction writer
- October 9 – Durs Grünbein, German poet
- August 25 – Taslima Nasrin, Bangladeshi-born poet, writer, physician and feminist
- August 27 – Sjón, born Sigurjón Birgir Sigurðsson, Icelandic poet, lyricist and novelist
- October 24 – Nujoom Al-Ghanem, Emirati Arabic poet and film director
- December 6 – Julia Kasdorf, American poet
- December 31 – Machi Tawara 俵万智, Japanese writer, translator and poet
- March 13 – Seyhan Erözçelik, Turkish poet (died 2011)
- Also:
  - Glyn Maxwell, British poet and author
  - Jean Sprackland, English poet and essayist
  - Virgil Suárez, Cuban American poet and novelist

== Deaths ==
Birth years link to the corresponding "[year] in poetry" article:

- January 17 – Gerrit Achterberg, 56 (born 1905), Dutch poet
- January 20 – Robinson Jeffers, 85 (born 1887), American poet and playwright
- March 16 – Dora Adele Shoemaker, 89 (born 1873), American poet, playwright, educator
- March 18 – George Sylvester Viereck, 77 (born 1884), American poet and novelist, as well as a pro-German propagandist during both World War I and World War II
- May 26 – Wilfrid Wilson Gibson, 83 (born 1878), English poet
- June 2 – Vita Sackville-West, 70 (born 1892), English novelist and poet
- June 8 – William Stanley Braithwaite (born 1878), American poet
- June 22 – John Holmes, 58, American educator and poet
- July 27 – Richard Aldington, 70, English writer and poet
- August 4 – Veikko Antero Koskenniemi, 77, Finnish poet
- August 9 – Hermann Hesse, 95, Swiss novelist and poet in German
- August 18 – Rosemary Carr Benét, 65(?), poet and widow of Stephen Vincent Benét

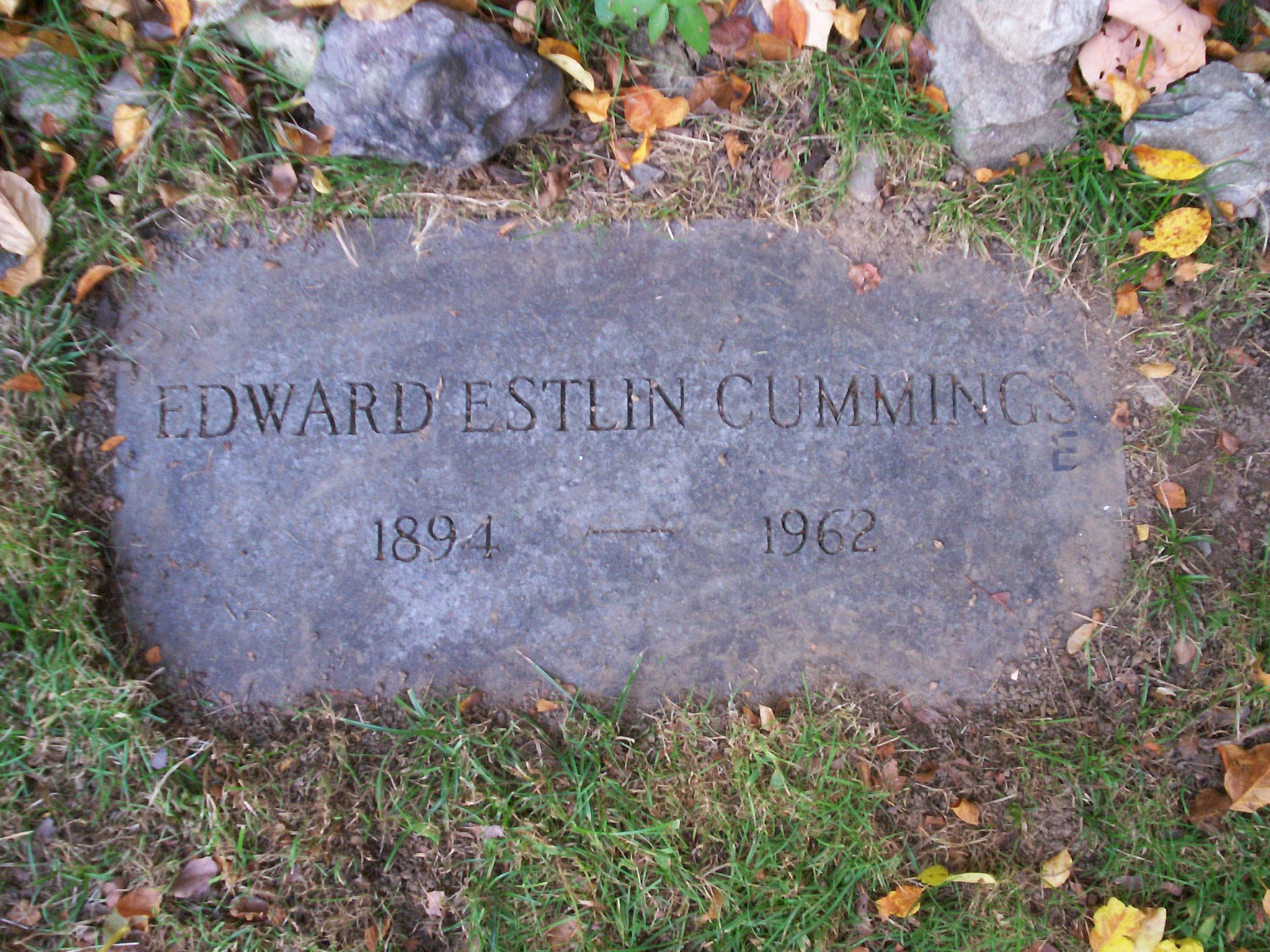
Grave of E. E. Cummings

- August 29 – Alan Mulgan (born 1881), New Zealand poet
- September 2 – Natalia Negru, 79 (born 1882), Romanian poet
- September 3 – E. E. Cummings, 67 (born 1894), American poet, of a stroke;
- October 3 – Dakotsu Iida 飯田 蛇笏, commonly referred to as "Dakotsu", pen names of Takeji Iida 飯田 武治 (born 1885), Japanese haiku poet; trained under Takahama Kyoshi
- November 3 – Ralph Hodgson, 91 (born 1871), English poet
- December 3 – Dame Mary Gilmore, 97, Australian socialist, poet and journalist

== See also ==
- Poetry
- List of poetry awards
- List of years in poetry
