= Southmost Twelve =

Collected poems by R. D. Fitzgerald

- First edition
- Author: Robert D. Fitzgerald
- Language: English
- Genre: poetry collection
- Publisher: Angus and Robertson
- Publication date: 1962
- Publication place: Australia
- Media type: Print
- Pages: 60 pp
- Preceded by: This Night's Orbit : Verses
- Followed by: Robert D. Fitzgerald

Southmost Twelve (1962) is the fifth poetry collection by Australian poet Robert D. Fitzgerald. It won the Grace Leven Prize for Poetry in 1962.

The collection consists of 32 poems, all except three of which were previously published in various Australian poetry and general magazines. Its major poem is "The Wind at Your Door" which had only been published previously as a limited edition volume in 1959.

== Contents ==
- "What Coin Soever"
- "Edge"
- "Southmost Twelve"
- "The Waterfall"
- "Verities"
- "Grace Before Meat"
- "One Day's Journey"
- "Song in Autumn"
- "Drift"
- "Bog and Candle"
- "Insight : Creak of the Crow"
- "Insight : The Dunce's Cap"
- "Insight : Wings Above Wings"
- "Insight : In the Street"
- "Insight : Vision"
- "Insight : Memorial Arch"
- "Strata"
- "Macquarie Place"
- "Quayside Meditation"
- "Tocsin"
- "Protest"
- "This Between Us..."
- "Relic at Strength-Fled"
- "Embarkation"
- "Caprice"
- "As Between Neighbours..."
- "Intimations of Immortality from Recollections of One Thing and Another"
- "Album Verse (To J. K. F. G.)"
- "Laus Deo"
- "The Wind at Your Door"
- "Beginnings"
- "Acknowledgement to Norman Lindsay"

== Critical reception ==
Ronald McCuaig in The Bulletin noted "The masterpiece of Fitzgerald's book is 'The Wind at Your Door', for those who like what you might call representational poetry the finest poem he has written. In the meditative and metaphysical pieces and suites which precede it he is as good as ever he was; there is the same sharp acquisitive eye for image."

In his review of the poetry collection in The Sydney Morning Herald Gustav Cross opined: "Directness, lucidity and a beautifully exact dramatic or logical construction mean much more to Mr Fitzgerald than richness of verbal texture. As in 'The Wind at Your Door,' the poet is most concerned to find a pattern of meaning underlying the chaos and senseless violence around us."

== Awards ==
- 1962 - winner Grace Leven Prize for Poetry

== See also ==
- 1962 in Australian literature
- 1962 in poetry
