= Marjorie Jacobs =

Australian historian

Marjorie Jacobs AO
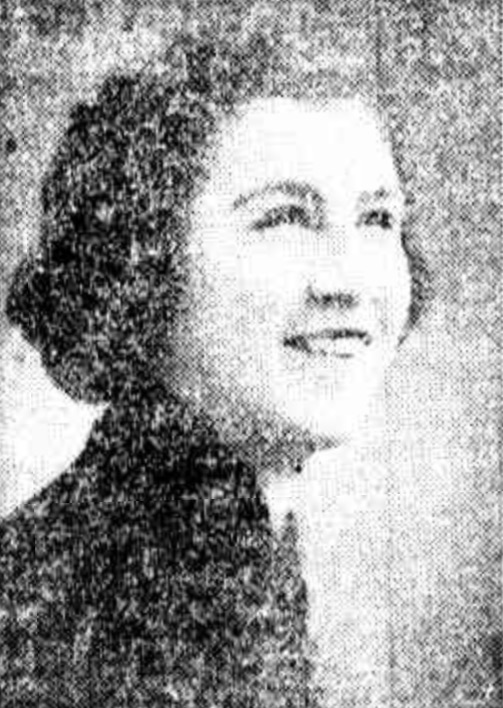
- Jacobs in 1937
- Born: 26 August 1915; Gordon, New South Wales, Australia
- Died: 12 July 2013 (aged 97); Chatswood, New South Wales, Australia
- Relatives: Kenneth Jacobs, brother

Academic background
- Education: University of Sydney

Academic work
- Institutions: University of Sydney

Marjorie Grace Jacobs AO (26 August 1915 – 12 July 2013) was an Australian historian and emeritus professor at the University of Sydney.

== Early life and education ==
Jacobs was born in 1915 in Gordon, a suburb of Sydney, New South Wales. She was educated at Ravenswood School but, when that school was sold to the Methodist Church, she transferred to the Sydney Church of England Girls Grammar School at North Sydney. Jacobs lived at Women's College during her undergraduate degree at the University of Sydney and in 1934 won the George Arnold Wood Memorial Prize for first year British history. In her second year she won the Frank Albert Prize with a high distinction in anthropology. She graduated with a BA Hons in 1936 and won a University Medal. Jacobs won the Frazer Scholarship for History in 1937 to work for her MA. In 1941 she won a second University Medal for her MA thesis on German colonialism in the Pacific.

== Career ==
Jacobs joined the staff of Sydney University in 1938 as associate lecturer, appointed by Challis Professor of History, Stephen Henry Roberts, for four years. In 1943–44 she was employed by United States Army's Historical Section in Australia, where she researched medical services in the South-West Pacific. When General MacArthur moved from Australia, Jacobs returned to Sydney University where she received a tenured lectureship in 1945. After a period on sabbatical in London during 1946–47, she returned to Sydney, becoming senior lecturer in 1949 and associate professor in 1967. Just two years later she was promoted full professor, only the second woman at the university to be appointed. Her retirement in 1980 was celebrated with a festschrift presented by South-East Asian historians and she was awarded the title emeritus Professor.

Jacobs was a member of the Council of the Royal Australian Historical Society in 1954–55 and again in 1986–87. She was made an Officer of the Order of Australia in the 1988 Queen's Birthday Honours for " service to education, particularly in the field of Indian history".
