= Between Two Tides =

Narrative poem by R. D. Fitzgerald

- Author: R. D. Fitzgerald
- Language: English
- Publisher: Halstead Press, Sydney
- Publication date: 1952
- Publication place: Australia
- Media type: Print (hardcover)
- Pages: 79
- Preceded by: Heemskerck Shoals
- Followed by: This Night's Orbit : Verses

Between Two Tides (1952) is a long narrative poem by Australian poet R. D. Fitzgerald, which included illustrations by Norman Lindsay. It won the Grace Leven Prize for Poetry in 1952.

== Outline ==
The poem is "drawn from An Account of the Natives of the Tongan Islands by J. M. Martin (1817)", which "Fitzgerald had worked on intermittently over many years". "In five parts, the poem relates and discusses the life and exploits of Will Mariner, a young sailor on the privateer Port au Prince, which was attacked and burned by Tongan natives in 1806."

== Reviews ==
A reviewer in The Sydney Morning Herald noted that the "theme of the eternally troubled mind with which man regards his destiny is not too profound to overload a simple narrative. Here is a story-poem which will please those whose palates have never become too sophisticated to reject the flavour of Treasure Island or Masefield's Dauber."

== Awards ==
- 1952 - winner Grace Leven Prize for Poetry

== See also ==
- 1952 in poetry
- 1952 in literature
- 1952 in Australian literature
