= Eve Pownall =

Australian writer (1901–1982)

Eve Pownall MBE
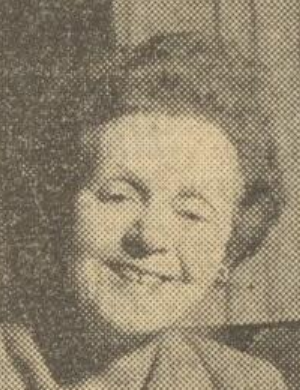
- Born: Marjorie Evelyn Sheridan; 12 January 1902 (Note: Some sources cite 1901, and Trove shows different years in heading and text.); Sydney, New South Wales, Australia
- Died: 15 November 1982 (aged 80); Forestville, New South Wales
- Occupations: Writer and historian
- Writing career
- Language: English
- Years active: 1945–1982
- Notable work: The Australia Book
- Notable awards: Children's Book of the Year Award: Older Readers 1952

Marjorie Evelyn "Eve" Pownall MBE (née Sheridan; 12 January 1902 – 15 November 1982) was an Australian writer for children and historian. Her best known work was The Australia Book (1952). She was a founding member of the Children's Book Council of Australia (CBCA), and the Eve Pownall Award for Information Books is presented each year by the CBCA in her honour.

== Early life and education ==
Marjorie Evelyn Sheridan was born on 12 January 1902 in Kings Cross, Sydney, Australia, the eldest of three children. Her father was Percival Joseph Sheridan and her mother Evelyn Irene, née Lane. The family lived in Kiama, Windsor, Muswellbrook, and Sydney, where Eve attended North Sydney Girls High School.

She undertook a secretarial course before finding work at Fox Film and then at Metro-Goldwyn-Mayer, until her marriage in December 1929.

Pownall began to review children's literature for Australasian Book News and Literary Journal, and later began writing children's fiction and non-fiction of her own. She was appointed an MBE in 1978 and was the first recipient of the Lady Cutler award for distinguished service to children's literature in New South Wales.

Pownall was a founding member of the Children's Book Council of Australia (CBCA) in 1945, and was associated with it for the rest of her life.

== Recognition and honours ==
Pownall was appointed a Member of the British Empire (MBE) in 1978, for services to literature.

She was the first recipient of the Lady Cutler Award for Distinguished Services to Children's Literature in New South Wales.

The CBCA presents the annual Eve Pownall Award for Information Books in her honour.

=== For specific works ===
- 1952 – winner Children's Book of the Year Award: Older Readers for The Australia Book

== Personal life and death ==
She married Leslie Pownall in December 1929. The couple had two children.

Pownall died at her home in Forestville, Sydney, on 15 November 1982.

== Bibliography ==
=== Children's fiction ===
- Nursery Rhymes Told Anew (1945)
- Squik the Squirrel Possum (1949)
- Cousins-Come-Lately : Adventures in Old Sydney Town (1952)
- Five Busy Merry-Makers (1953)
- Binty the Bandicoot (1957)
- A Drover (1970)

=== Children's non-fiction ===
- The Australia Book (1952) illustrated by Margaret Senior
- Exploring Australia (1958)
- A Pioneer Daughter (1968)
- The Great South Land (1969) illustrated by Christine Shaw

=== Non-fiction ===
- Mary of Maranoa : Tales of Australian Pioneer Women (1959)
- The Thirsty Land : Harnessing Australia's Water Resources (1967)
- The Children's Book Council of Australia : 1945–1980 (1980)
- Australia From The Beginning (1980) illustrated by Walter Cunningham
