= The Land's Meaning =

1962 poem by Australian poet Randolph Stow

- by Randolph Stow
- Country: Australia
- Language: English
- Publisher: Australian Poetry 1962 edited by Geoffrey Dutton
- Publication date: 1962
- Lines: 31

"The Land's Meaning" (1962) is a poem by Australian poet Randolph Stow.

It was originally published in Australian Poetry 1962 edited by Geoffrey Dutton in 1962, and was subsequently reprinted in the author's single-author collections and a number of Australian poetry anthologies.

== Critical reception ==
In a review of the poet's collection Outrider : Poems, 1956-1962 for The Sydney Morning Herald Gustav Cross, after quoting from this particular work, commented that "There is nothing derivative about these poems, but it is not accident that their subject-matter is sometimes the same as Patrick White's: both writers are shaping the Australian myth."

Bruce Clunies Ross, in an essay titled "Landscape and the Australian Imagination", stated that in this poem "the images of landscape and exploration combine into an extended metaphor for human isolation and the search for some sign of love, but the poem reveals the close connection in Stow's imagination between landscape and feeling, which is at the heart of his Australian writings."

== Publication history ==
After the poem's initial publication in Australian Poetry 1962 it was reprinted as follows:

- Outrider : Poems, 1956-1962 by Randolph Stow, illustrated by Sidney Nolan, MacDonald, 1962
- Australian Letters vol. 5 no. 2 December 1962
- The Vital Decade : Ten Years of Australian Art and Letters edited by Geoffrey Dutton and Max Harris, Sun Books, 1968
- A Book of Australian Verse edited by Judith Wright, Oxford University Press, 1956
- Poetry from Australia : Judith Wright, William Hart-Smith, Randolph Stow edited by Howard Sergeant, Pergamon Press, 1969
- A Counterfeit Silence: Selected Poems by Randolph Stow, Angus and Robertson, 1969
- Twelve Poets, 1950-1970 edited by Alexander Craig, Jacaranda Press, 1971
- Australian Verse from 1805 : A Continuum edited by Geoffrey Dutton, Rigby, 1976
- Wide Domain : Western Australian Themes and Images edited by Bruce Bennett and William Grono, Angus and Robertson, 1979
- My Country : Australian Poetry and Short Stories, Two Hundred Years edited by Leonie Kramer, Lansdowne, 1985
- Margins : A West Coast Selection of Poetry 1829-1988 edited by William Grono, Fremantle Press, 1988
- Randolph Stow : Visitants, Episodes from Other Novels, Poems, Stories, Interviews, and Essays edited by Anthony J. Hassall, University of Queensland Press, 1990
- Australian Poetry in the Twentieth Century edited by Robert Gray and Geoffrey Lehmann, Heinemann, 1991
- The Penguin Anthology of Australian Poetry edited by John Kinsella, Penguin, 2009
- The Puncher & Wattmann Anthology of Australian Poetry edited by John Leonard, Puncher & Wattmann, 2009
- Australian Poetry Since 1788 edited by Geoffrey Lehmann and Robert Gray , University of NSW Press, 2011
- The Land's Meaning : New Selected Poems edited by John Kinsella, Fremantle Press, 2012
- The Fremantle Press Anthology of Western Australian Poetry edited by John Kinsella and Tracy Ryan, Fremantle Press, 2017

== Notes ==
- The poem is dedicated to Sidney Nolan
- You can read the full text of the poem in The Weekend Australian, 7 July 2012

== See also ==
- 1962 in Australian literature
- 1962 in poetry
