= Marcia Ella-Duncan =

Australian netball player

Marcia Ella-Duncan OAM
Personal information
- Born: 1963 (age 62–63) La Perouse, New South Wales

Netball career
- Playing position: Centre
Years	National team	Caps
1986-1987	Australian Diamonds	18

Marcia Lynne Ella-Duncan OAM (born 1963) is a former Australian netball player. She became the first Indigenous netballer to represent the Australian Diamonds.

== Personal ==
Ella was born in 1963 in La Perouse, a suburb of Sydney. She is a descendant of the Yuin nation. Her parents moved to Sydney from South Coast, New South Wales. She was the ninth of twelve children. Three brothers - Mark, Glenn and Gary represented the Wallabies. She attended schools in La Perouse and Matraville. She retired from representative netball at 26 after marrying rugby league player Phil Duncan and having her first child. She has two daughters.

After retiring from netball, Ella-Duncan has been involved in numerous Indigenous Australian issues criminal justice, family and child well-being, community development and land management.

== Netball ==
Ella represented New South Wales (NSW) at eleven and then selected in NSW 16 Schoolgirls and then NSW U21 teams. She started off as a goal defence but then moved to play centre. In 1983, Ella took up a netball scholarship at the Australian Institute of Sport and became the first Indigenous Australian to take up an AIS scholarship. From 1983 to 1985, she held an AIS netball scholarship. Between 1984 and 1987, she was regular member of NSW State Team.

Ella became the first Indigenous player to represent Australia when she played against New Zealand on 3 May 1986 in Christchurch. She was a member of the Australian Diamonds in 1986 and 1987 and this included winning a silver medal at the 1987 World Netball Tournament. She represented the Australian Diamonds 18 times.

== Recognition ==
- 1988 - Medal of the Order of Australia (OAM) for service to netball
- 2015 - Australian Netball Hall of Fame
- Aboriginal and Islander Sports Hall of Fame
- Photographic Portrait held by the National Portrait Gallery of Australia.
