= Strange Intruder =

1956 film by Irving Rapper

- Directed by: Irving Rapper
- Written by: The Shades Will Not Vanish by Helen Fowler
- Screenplay by: David Evans; Warren Douglas
- Produced by: Lindsley Parsons
- Starring: Edmund Purdom; Ida Lupino; Ann Harding
- Cinematography: Ernest Haller
- Edited by: Maurice Wright
- Music by: Paul Dunlap
- Production company: Lindsley Parsons Productions
- Distributed by: Allied Artists Pictures
- Release date: September 2, 1956
- Running time: 82 minutes
- Country: United States
- Language: English
- Budget: $500,000

Strange Intruder is a 1956 American film noir crime film directed by Irving Rapper and starring Edmund Purdom, Ida Lupino and Ann Harding. It was based on the 1952 Australian novel The Shades Will Not Vanish by Helen Fowler. The film was produced by Lindsley Parsons for release by Allied Artists. It was one of a number of noirs featuring Lupino.

== Plot ==
Dying in a Korea prisoner-of-war camp, Adrian Carmichael learns his wife Alice has been unfaithful back home. He makes friend Paul Quentin promise not to let the Carmichaels' children be raised by another man, no matter what.

Paul escapes from camp and is treated for trauma in a U.S. hospital for veterans. Having no family of his own, he visits Carmichael's and is made welcome. Alice has ended her affair with Howard Gray, but he is blackmailing her. Paul becomes consumed with his friend's last request and has terrible visions of killing Carmichael's kids.

After a fight with Gray, he comes to realize that a return to the VA hospital is necessary. Treated like a part of the family now, Paul believes his frightening promise to be a thing of the past.

== Cast ==
- Edmund Purdom as Paul Quentin
- Ida Lupino as Alice Carmichael
- Ann Harding as Mary Carmichael
- Jacques Bergerac as Howard Gray
- Gloria Talbott as Meg Carmichael
- Carl Benton Reid as James Carmichael
- Douglas Kennedy as Parry SanBorne
- Donald Murphy as Dr. Adrian Carmichael
- Mimi Gibson as Libby Carmichael

== Bibliography ==
- Edwards, Paul M. A Guide to Films on the Korean War. Greenwood Publishing Group, 1997.
- Spicer, Andrew. Historical Dictionary of Film Noir. Scarecrow Press, 2010.
