= The Australia Book =

Book by Eve Pownall

- Author: Eve Pownall
- Language: English
- Genre: Children's non-fiction
- Publisher: John Sands
- Publication date: 1952
- Publication place: Australia
- Media type: Print
- Pages: 44pp
- Preceded by: Cousins-Come-Lately : Adventures in Old Sydney Town
- Followed by: Five Busy Merry-Makers

The Australia Book (1952) is a children's information book by Australian author and historian Eve Pownall, illustrated by Margaret Senior. The book won the Children's Book of the Year Award: Older Readers in 1952.

== Book summary ==
The Australia Book documents the history of the country from before European settlement up till the 1950s, when the book was written. It is aimed at younger children and is heavily illustrated.

== Critical reception ==
G.W.H. in The Argus was impressed with the work: "In the simplest language the story is told from the time of the early explorers to the postwar migration schemes. The pictures tell so much that even children too young to read will follow them and establish mental landmarks for use later on. And the parents, whose job will be to read it to them, will probably find that they have filled in a few yawning gaps in their knowledge too. This pictorial record is likely to become one of the juvenile classics for years to come."

The West Australian was equally as enthusiastic: "The Australia Book, although designed for children, will be perused by their elders with equal interest because it sets out in simplest form the history of their country probably more vividly than ever before."

== See also ==
- 1952 in Australian literature
