= Shirley Kaye Randell =

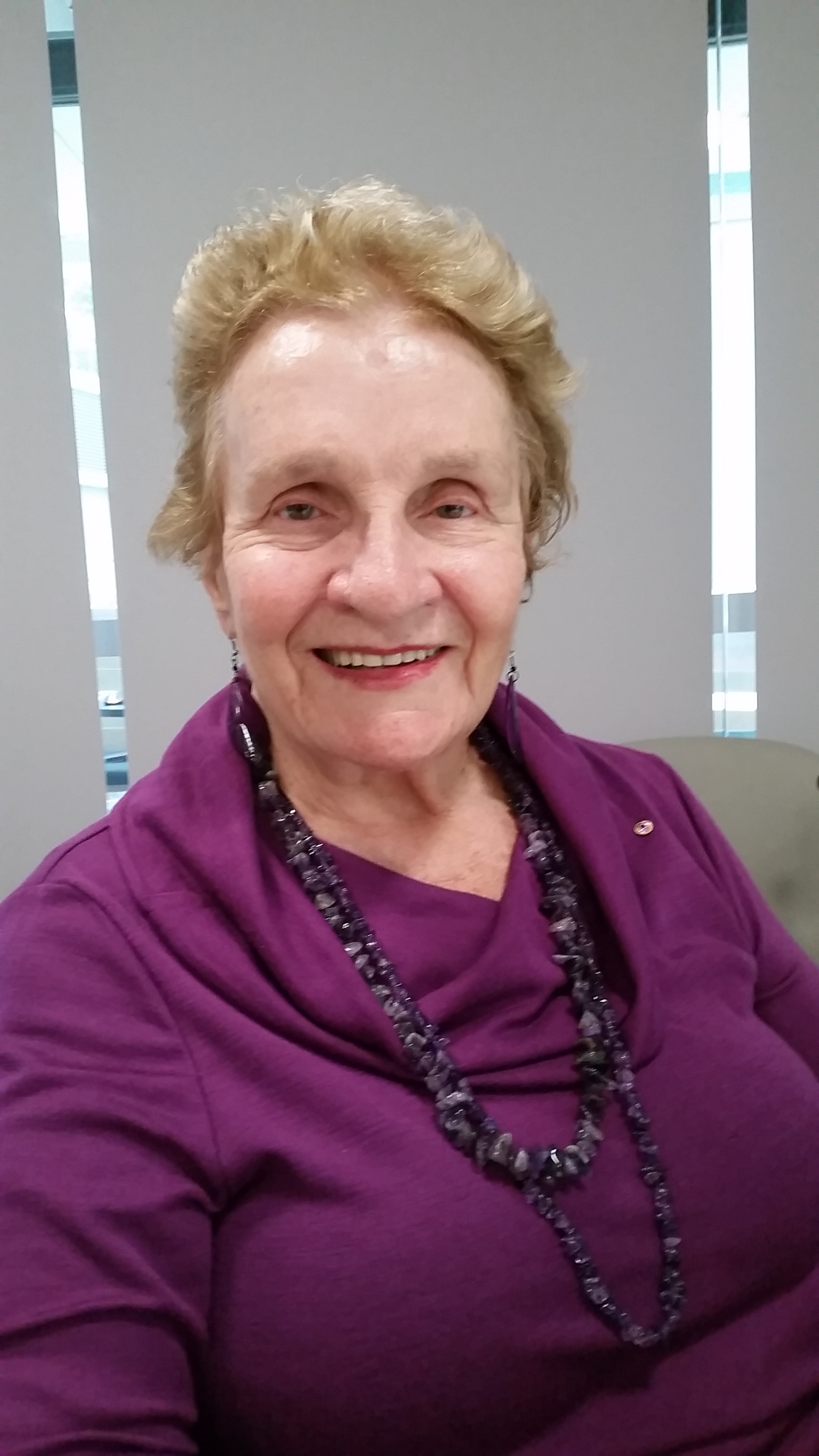
- Occupation(s): Educator, advocate, mentor and leader

Shirley Kaye Randell (born 8 March 1940) is an educator, advocate, mentor and leader. She is an Officer of the Order of Australia (AO), having received the award in 2010 for her services to international relations through education, public sector, institutional reform and economic empowerment of women in Australia, the Pacific, Asia and Africa.

== Boards, councils and committees ==
Randell is a board member of the Australian Government Women’s Alliance – Economic Security for Women, the indigo foundation, and Paper Crown Institute of Canada. She is an Ambassador of Dignity Ltd, the Australian Centre for Leadership for Women (ACLW), Women’s International Cricket League/FairBreak and The International Alliance for Women (TIAW). She is a member of the Graduate Women International Projects Committee, the Virginia Gildersleeve International Fund Development Committee, and sits on the several editorial boards including the BioMedical-Central Women’s Health Journal. As of 2021 she is president of the Independent Scholars Association of Australia Council (ISAA).

== Achievements and awards ==
Randell was made a Member of the Order of Australia (AM) in 1988 and promoted to Officer (AO) in 2010. Randell has received the Distinguished Alumna Award, from the University of New England for "international promotion of women’s rights" and the University of Canberra, The Financial Review/Westpac Inaugural Australian100 Women of Influence and The International Alliance of Women 100 World of Difference Awards for "contributions to economic empowerment of women in the community".

== Publications ==
Randell has contributed to reports including: the Commonwealth report Evaluation of the Impact of Rwandan Women’s Political Leadership on Democracy and Development, and the joint ILO-UNESCO report Violence and Insecurity in Schools for Teaching Personnel: Impact on Educational Access.

== Ancestry ==
Randell was born Shirley Kaye Izett on 8th March 1940 in Perth, Western Australia to New Zealand born Eric Charles Izett (22 November 1905-23 September 1959), her paternal grandmother Annie Louisa Hedgman (11 November 1866-28 August 1946) Annie's grandparents Samuel Hedgman and Mary Ann Evans having arrived at Lyttleton 18 September 1851 onboard "Lady Nugent". The Hedgman family were from England with strong connections to both London and Norwich - family researcher Richard Anderson has been able to trace their Hedgman roots back to the 1600's.
