= Joan Woodberry =

Australian writer

- Born: Joan Merle Woodberry; 10 February 1921; Narrabri, New South Wales
- Died: 31 January 2010 (aged 88); Hobart, Tasmania, Australia
- Writing career
- Language: English
- Years active: 1959–1983
- Notable work: Rafferty Rides a Winner
- Notable awards: Children's Book of the Year Award: Older Readers 1962

Doctor Joan Merle Woodberry AM (10 February 1921 – 31 January 2010), born in Narrabri, New South Wales was an Australian author and teacher. She was made a member of the Order of Australia in 1981 for services to literature and education, and was awarded an Honorary Doctorate from the University of Tasmania in 2000.

== Bibliography ==
=== Children's fiction ===
- Rafferty Takes to Fishing (1959)
- Floodtide for Rafferty (1960)
- Rafferty Rides a Winner (1961)
- Come Back Peter (1968)
- Ash Tuesday (1968)
- The Cider Duck (1969)
- Little Black Swan (1970)
- A Garland of Gannets (1970)

=== Edited ===
- Andrew Bent and the Freedom of the Press in Van Diemen's Land (1972)
- The Honour Book : Short Stories, Articles, Poetry (1978)
- An Anthology of Short Stories, Articles and Poems by Tasmanian Authors (1979)

=== Non-fiction ===
- Historic Hobart Sketchbook (1976) with Frank Mather
- New Norfolk Sketchbook (1977) with John Alty
