= The Ridge and the River =

Book by Tom Hungerford

- First image
- Author: Tom Hungerford
- Language: English
- Publisher: Angus and Robertson
- Publication date: 1952
- Media type: Print (hardback & paperback)
- Pages: 220 pp
- Followed by: Riverslake

The Ridge and the River (1952) is the debut novel by Australian writer Tom Hungerford. It won the 1952 ALS Gold Medal. Based on the author's own experiences, the novel follows an Australian patrol on Bougainville Island during World War II.

== Plot summary ==
The novel is based on the author's experiences serving with the Australian army fighting the Japanese in Papua New Guinea during World War II. The story follows an Australian patrol of a dozen men sent to reconnoitre a Japanese position on Bougainville Island. An action ensues in which two of the Australians are injured. The patrol must then find a way back to base, through the jungle, evading the Japanese and ensuring their wounded reach safety.

== Author's intent ==
“I wanted to record what it was like to be a soldier in the Australian army in the Islands at that time; I wanted to express the immense admiration I had then for the Australian fighting man.”

"When I wrote Ridge, I wrote it so that someone a thousand years from now could pick it up and know what that jungle fighting was like. I was in New Britain, New Guinea and Bougainville during the war-and the book could have been set in anyone of them, but the Bougainville campaign was the basis for it. It was a very dramatic period in my life-in anyone's life who went through it. I was in a commando group. We did map-making. We harassed. We captured prisoners, set up a lot of ambushes, gathered information. I can read passages from The Ridge and the River now that were written straight from experience-and they can make my hair curl. They can fill me with a dreadful nostalgia for the men who died or who have come back and changed."

== Reviews ==
Ainslie Baker in The Australian Women's Weekly noted that the author "...has written a book that is utterly without pretension. The result is a vigor and authenticity that lifts the work far above the average war story. Its mateship is never mawkish, its disenchanted soldier humor never forced, nor its emotion debased to sentimentality."

In a survey of Australian war novels from the 1950s Rick Hosking wrote in 1985: "By 1954, several possible ways of using the past, of reworking subjects from the war, must have been apparent to intending ex-servicemen-novelists: the novel with the strongly-felt anti-war theme, the novel of apprenticeship, with war making Bills out of Billys, the novel describing the exploits of the 'terrible laughing men in the slouch hats', or the novel based on real, dramatic events. T. A. G. Hungerford's The Ridge and the River, published in 1952, offered one more alternative, one that, in the long run, proved the most enduring. He chose to limit the scope of his novel, taking what must have been reasonably typical experiences of jungle warfare, and concentrating on character types not normally found in war fiction, ordinary but complicated human beings. In other words, Hungerford chose not to depict the digger of legend and myth, nor did he set out to describe the great battles where wars are won or lost, nor did he rework heroic or dramatic real events. Instead he deliberately confined his attentions to several days in the life of a commando patrol on an un-named island (no doubt Bougainville) at the very end of the war, with the Hiroshima bombing only days away."

In The Australian Collection: Australia’s Greatest Books, Geoffrey Dutton describes how, “The survival of humanity in wartime is the deep, sad subject of The Ridge and the River, indicated in the end by stoicism rather than heroism.”

Edward 'Weary' Dunlop described the novel as capturing "the essence of jungle warfare as it was fought by Australians".

== Awards and nominations ==
- 1952 — winner ALS Gold Medal

== Serialisation ==
The novel was serialised in condensed form, in nine parts, in the following Australian newspapers:

- The Sunday Herald, weekly, starting from 22 June 1952
- The Argus, daily, starting from 28 July 1952
- The Western Mail, weekly, starting from 31 July 1952

== Australian radio versions ==
- The Ridge and the River
