= Helen Fowler =

Australian writer

Helen Fowler (born 1910) was an Australian writer. Her debut novel The Shades Will Not Vanish became a best seller and was adapted for radio and film.

Fowler studied arts at the University of Sydney and was a primary school teacher for several years. Fowler was active in conservative political groups in Australia.

Fowler left Sydney in 1957.

== Books ==
- The Shades Will Not Vanish (1952) a.k.a. The Intruder
- The Family at Willow Bend (1955)
- The Careless People (1955)
- Green Leaves (1957)
- Hold a Bright Mirror (1959)
- The Refugee (1960)
- The Blazing Straw (1961)
