= Rod Moran =

Australian poet and journalist

Rod Moran (born 1952) is an Australian poet and journalist.

Moran lives in Western Australia. He has written poetry, and books, as well as being a regular contributor to The West Australian newspaper on military history.

He has also won awards for his poetry.

He has written books challenging significant historical issues about the Forrest River massacre, in particular the role and reliability of Ernest Gribble.

He has also engaged in an extended debate with historians about the issues.

He is also experienced in extensive oral history work from a project in Rockingham, Western Australia.

== Bibliography ==
=== Poetry ===
Collections

- Moran, Rod (1981). High rise sniper. Illustrated by Melody Hampton. Artlook Books.
- — (1988). Against the era : poems. Fremantle Arts Centre Press.
- — (1994). Listening to the train passing. Platypus Press.
- — (2005). The paradoxes of water : selected and new poems 1970-2005. Salt Publishing.

List of poems

Title	Year	First published	Reprinted/collected
Memoir of birds	1996	Moran, Rod (May 1996). "Memoir of birds". Quadrant. 40 (5): 30.	
The Dean Martin rave	1996	Moran, Rod (May 1996). "The Dean Martin rave". Quadrant. 40 (5): 31.	
A homage to the elephant	2003	Moran, Rod (July–August 2003). "A homage to the elephant". Quadrant. 47 (7–8 [398]): 57.	
Kimberley II	2016	Moran, Rod (January–February 2016). "Kimberley II". Quadrant. 60 (1–2): 111.	
Style	2016	Moran, Rod (January–February 2016). "Style". Quadrant. 60 (1–2): 111.	

=== Non-fiction ===
- Moran, Rod (1992). Synoptic catalogue for the Rockingham Oral History Archive. Rockingham District Historical Society.
- — (1995). Icon of the North : the legend of Tom Gray. Access Press.
- — (1999). Massacre myth : an investigation into allegations concerning the mass murder of Aborigines at Forrest River, 1926. Foreword by Francis Theodore Page Burt. Access Press.
- — (2002). Sex, maiming and murder : seven case studies into the reliability of Reverend E.R.B. Gribble, Superintendent, Forrest River Mission 1913-1928, as a witness to the truth. Access Press.
- — (2016). "A forensic footnote to the Forrest River debate". Quadrant. 60 (7–8): 73–74.

———————

Bibliography notes
