= The Wind at Your Door =

Book by R. D. Fitzgerald

- Author: R. D. Fitzgerald
- Language: English
- Genre: Poetry
- Publisher: Talkarra Press
- Publication date: 1959
- Publication place: Australia
- Media type: Print
- Pages: 15pp
- Preceded by: Heemskerck Shoals
- Followed by: Southmost Twelve

The Wind at Your Door (1959) is a one-poem volume by Australian poet R. D. Fitzgerald. The poem was originally published in The Bulletin on 17 December 1958, and later in a 275 copy Talkarra Press limited edition, signed by the author.

The poem won the Grace Leven Prize for Poetry in 1959.

The poem is based on the uprising of Irish rebel convicts at Castle Hill, New South Wales in 1804. It concerns two main characters, Martin Mason surgeon, and overseer of the brutal flogging of the poet's namesake, Morris Fitzgerral.

== Critical reception ==
In her chapter on R. D. Fitzgerald in Preoccupations in Australian Poetry, Judith Wright noted that the poem dealt with the moral problem of "the conflict between the claims of heartless authority and of its victims; a conflict that was introduced to Australian soil with the First Fleet."

The Oxford Companion to Australian Literature noted that "...Fitzgerald sees the continuing problem, on both the both national and the individual level, of the Australian identity. On the general level is the problem of the nation adapting to its development from a 'jail-yard'; on the personal level is the problem of individual Australians (in this case the poet himself) adapting to both sides of their ancestry, authoritarianism and rebellion against authority."

In his commentary on the poem in 60 Classic Australian Poems Geoff Page noted "As the definitive poem about Australia's convict past, R.D. Fitzgerald's "The Wind at Your Door" is going to be around for as long as we are willing to recognise that part of our history. Indeed, it remains a powerful instrument against our forgetting it."

== Notes ==
The convict Morris Fitzgerral also appears in Thomas Keneally's novel Passenger (1979).

== Further publications ==
- Australian Poetry 1959 edited by Nancy Keesing (1959)
- Australian Idiom : An Anthology of Contemporary Prose and Poetry edited by Harry Payne Heseltine (1963)
- Modern Australian Verse edited by Douglas Stewart (1964)
- Australian Writing Today edited by Charles Higham (1968)
- The Penguin Book of Australian Verse edited by Harry Payne Heseltine (1972)
- The Illustrated Treasury of Australian Verse edited by Beatrice Davis (1984)
- Cross-Country : A Book of Australian Verse edited by John Barnes and Brian MacFarlane, Heinemann, 1988
- My Country : Australian Poetry and Short Stories, Two Hundred Years edited by Leonie Kramer (1985)
- The New Oxford Book of Australian Verse edited by Les Murray (1986)
- Robert D. FitzGerald edited by Julian Croft (1987)
- The Macmillan Anthology of Australian Literature edited by Ken L. Goodwin and Alan Lawson (1990)
- The Faber Book of Modern Australian Verse edited by Vincent Buckley (1991)
- The Oxford Book of Modern Australian Verse edited by Peter Porter (1996)
- Family Ties : Australian Poems of the Family edited by Jennifer Strauss (1998)
- Australian Verse : An Oxford Anthology edited by John Leonard (1998)
- The Turning Wave : Poems and Songs of Irish Australia edited by Colleen Burke and Vincent Woods (2001)
- The Penguin Anthology of Australian Poetry edited by John Kinsella (2009)
- 60 Classic Australian Poems edited by Geoff Page (2009)
- Harbour City Poems : Sydney in Verse, 1788-2008 edited by Martin Langford (2009)
- Macquarie PEN Anthology of Australian Literature edited by Nicholas Jose, Kerryn Goldsworthy, Anita Heiss, David McCooey, Peter Minter, Nicole Moore, and Elizabeth Webby (2009)
- The Puncher & Wattmann Anthology of Australian Poetry edited by John Leonard (2009)
- Australian Poetry Since 1788 edited by Geoffrey Lehmann and Robert Gray (2011)

== See also ==
- 1958 in Australian literature
