= James McNulty (physician) =

Australian public health doctor (1926 – 2017)

Dr James McNulty AO (1926 – 27 January 2017) was an Australian public health doctor and the Commissioner for (Public) Health in Western Australia between 1979 and 1984.

Born in Belfast in 1926, he obtained his medical degree from Queen’s University of Belfast.

McNulty came to Western Australia in 1956 and worked as a medical officer and superintendent at the Kalgoorlie Hospital. His career in occupational and public health included a 12-year term as Commissioner of Public Health and executive director of the Australian College of Medical Administrators.

McNulty was known for his contributions to the improved ventilation conditions in mining in Western Australia and his analysis and reporting of the working conditions and the health of workers in the Wittenoom Asbestos mine from 1959 until its closure in 1966.

Following his retirement from the Health Department in 1987, McNulty was appointed as an Officer of the Order of Australia in the New Year's Honours List of 1988 for services to medicine and health administration.
