= Rafferty Rides a Winner =

Book by Joan Woodberry

- Author: Joan Woodberry
- Language: English
- Genre: Children's fiction
- Publisher: Parrish, London
- Publication date: 1961
- Publication place: Australia
- Media type: Print
- Pages: 187pp
- Preceded by: Floodtide for Rafferty
- Followed by: Come Back Peter

Rafferty Rides a Winner (1961) is a novel for children by Australian author Joan Woodberry, illustrated by the author. It was joint winner of the Children's Book of the Year Award: Older Readers in 1962.

== Plot outline ==
Rafferty, an English boy attempting to learn how to become Australian, and his friends attempt to scrape together 60 pounds via a series of various means in order to purchase a boat.

== Critical reception ==
While covering a selection of recent books for children in The Canberra Times in 1962, a reviewer was not at all impressed with the book: "Its plot and characters, similar to the previous two books by Miss Woodberry, follow the cheap "formula" pattern of the comic book, in which a group of slick youngsters, chattering a lot of slick slang, embark on a series of slick adventures. It offers only escape entertainment of the most mediocre kind."

== See also ==
- 1961 in Australian literature
