= The Shades Will Not Vanish =

1952 novel by Helen Fowler

- Author: Helen Fowler
- Language: English
- Genre: drama
- Publisher: Angus & Robertson
- Publication date: 1952
- Publication place: Australia

The Shades Will Not Vanish is a 1952 Australian novel by Helen Fowler. It was her first novel.

The book was published in the US under the title of The Intruder.

The Daily Telegraph called it "a powerful tale which, on the whole, is well told."

== Radio adaptations ==
The novel was read out on the Australian radio in serial form in 1952.

The novel was also adapted as a one-hour play on Australian radio in 1955 starring Bruce Stewart.

== Film adaptation ==
Film rights were bought by Allied Artists in 1954. The book was adapted into a Hollywood film Strange Intruder (1956).

== Premise ==
A former POW visits the family of a friend.
