= Tom Hungerford =

Western Australian writer

- Born: 5 May 1915; Perth, Western Australia
- Died: 20 June 2011 (aged 96); Perth, Western Australia
- Relatives: Vincent Michael Hungerford (father) Minerva Joyce Hungerford (mother) Michael Vincent William Hungerford (brother) Alice Winifred Eunice Hungerford (sister) Margaret Minerva Daisy Hungerford (sister)
- Writing career
- Pen name: T.A.G. Hungerford
- Notable works: Stories from Suburban Road, The Ridge and the River
- Notable awards: Member of the Order of Australia; 1988; Patrick White Award; 2002

Thomas Arthur Guy Hungerford, AM (5 May 1915 – 20 June 2011) was an Australian writer, noted for his World War II novel The Ridge and the River, and his short stories that chronicle growing up in South Perth, Western Australia during the Great Depression.

== Early life ==
Hungerford was born in Perth, Western Australia on 5 May 1915 to Arthur Townshend Hungerford and Minnie Hedley. One of four children, he grew up in South Perth, known then as the Queen Suburb, when the area was semi-rural, with market gardens. Hungerford recalled that "Perth was a much smaller enclave then. There was jungly bush all along that shore-streams, birds, swamps, gilgies (you call them yabbies). We used to go prawning, birdsnesting, fishing. We all had canoes-tin ones. We got money by paddling across the Swan to this side to sell the crabs we caught."

Hungerford was educated at South Perth State School, Perth Boys School and Perth Senior Technical College. In 1932 he joined the printing staff of the Perth evening newspaper the Daily News, working as a linotype mechanic.

== World War Two ==
Hungerford served with the Australian Army in Darwin, New Guinea, Bougainville and Morotai. He was a sergeant in 2/8 Australian Commando Squadron and was mentioned in despatches.

In 2005 the ABC's 7.30 Report reported his "unflinching depictions of jungle fighting are acknowledged as some of the best writing to come out of the war". Hungerford told the program he wasn't a hero: "I was one of a group of men all doing the same bloody thing. Sticking the head up, hoping to Christ it wouldn't be shot off." His war experiences formed the basis of the 1952 novel The Ridge and the River, described by Edward 'Weary' Dunlop as capturing "the essence of jungle warfare as it was fought by Australians".

After the war, Hungerford joined the British Commonwealth Occupation Force in Japan, and remained with it from 1945 to 1947. Out of those years in Japan came Hungerford's first book, Sowers of the Wind.

== Journalism and public relations ==
After the war, Hungerford wrote six stories for the Australian War Memorial's 'Stand Easy' series, an endeavour which in 1948 led Hungerford being appointed Editor of Publication at the War Memorial. After resigning from The War Museum, Hungerford freelanced and wrote stories for The Bulletin.

1948 included a three week period working as a press secretary for Billy Hughes. Upon leaving, Hungerford wrote to Hughes: "I will never work for you again. I'd rather go to bed with a sabre-toothed tiger".

In 1951 Hungerford joined the Australia News and Information Bureau, where he stayed for 15 years; following which he worked as a freelancer. In the 1970s Hungerford worked as a press secretary to Western Australian Premiers John Tonkin and Sir Charles Court.

== Writing ==
Hungerford began writing as a teenager and had his first published short story in 1942 in the Sydney Bulletin.

Hungerford's first book to be written, Sowers of the Wind, was based on his experience in Japan following the war. Sowers in the Wind, was held back by publisher Angus & Robertson because it dealt with the economic and sexual exploitation of the Japanese after the War by Australian occupation forces. Hungerford recounted that the book "grew out of my concern at Australian mistreatment of the Japanese during the Occupation. I felt that they were sowing a wind of hatred for the future." The novel won the 1949 Sydney Morning Herald prize for literature but was not published until 1954. Monash University's Robin Gerster told The Age in 2002: "Hungerford... wrote very perceptively and affectionately about the Japanese, which is not a bad effort for someone who fought them."

Hungerford's second novel to be written, Riverslake, came out of Hungerford’s experiences working in a migrant camp in Australia following WWII: "I saw a lot of the active xenophobia of the good old Aussie labourer. I watched uncouth, beer- sodden sots lording it over educated men. It made my blood boil. That's what Riverslake came out of."

Hungerford’s war experiences formed the basis of the novel The Ridge and the River. Hungerford wrote that "I wanted to record what it was like to be a soldier in the Australian army in the Islands at that time; I wanted to express the immense admiration I had then for the Australian fighting man."

His first volume of short fiction, Stories from Suburban Road, depict life during the Great Depression in the Perth riverside suburb of South Perth, and was later made into a play and a television series.

=== Novels ===
- The Ridge and the River (1950)
- Riverslake (1953)
- Sowers in the Wind (1954)
- Shake the Golden Bough (1963)

=== Short stories ===
- Wong Chu and the Queen's Letterbox (1976)
- The Only One Who Forgot (1951)
- What Happened to Joseph? (2005, a collection of short stories & poems)

=== Drama ===
- Stories from Suburban Road
- The Day It All Ended

=== Children's books ===
- Swagbelly Birdsnatcher and the Prince of Siam

=== Autobiography ===
- Stories From Suburban Road (1983)
- A Knockabout with a Slouch Hat
- Red Rover All Over

=== Non-fiction ===
- Fremantle, Landscapes and People (with photographer Roger Garwood) (1976)

=== Book reviews ===
- Selby, David. Hell and High Fever – reviewed in Quadrant 1/1 (Sum 1956/57): 93, 95.

== Prizes and other honours ==
Hungerford won the Crouch Gold Medal for Literature (1951), the Patricia Hackett Short Story prize (1962), the WA Weekly Literature Prize for Fiction (1964), and the Patrick White Award (2002).

He was made a Member of the Order of Australia in 1987. A portrait of him, c.1963, by Kate O'Connor is in the National Library of Australia. In 2004, he was pronounced a Living Treasure of Western Australia by the Western Australian Government A portrait of Hungerford hangs in the National Library of Australia.

Michael Crouch wrote a biography of Hungerford titled Literary Larrikin and he was interviewed by Hazel de Berg for the National Library of Australia.

The T. A. G. Hungerford Award is named for him and is awarded every two years to an unpublished author in Western Australia.
