= Enter Without So Much as Knocking =

1962 poem by Bruce Dawe

- by Bruce Dawe
- First published in: No Fixed Address : Poems, 1962
- Country: Australia
- Language: English

"Enter Without So Much as Knocking" is a 1962 poem written by Bruce Dawe. It was first published in the author's collection No Fixed Address : Poems in 1962. The poem has been set as a high school text around Australia.

== Analysis ==
=== Television ===
"Enter Without So Much as Knocking" was written in 1959 and displays an Australia during the advent of television. The post-war period of the 1950s and 1960s was a time of affluence when society and social values were changing. The poem follows one child in a typical nuclear family from birth through a rushed life, where he has little time for reflection, to his early death in an accident.

The poem opens with the birth of the main character and the first sound he hears is the television. It is as if he is born when the television is turned on. When he dies his death is like a television being turned off, leaving silence.

=== Consumerism ===
The father, mother and siblings in the poem are described using labels common in advertising. The mother is described as "economy-size(d)", this can be translated as "large". The term is usually used for soap powder or grocery purchases to imply quantity. The father is described as an "Anthony Squires-Coolstream-Summerweight Dad" and the siblings as being "straight off the Junior Department rack". Both these descriptions refer to clothing styles and the terms could be used in glossy magazines to describe new clothes. The people inside the clothing are not described, they are without character. Watching television, game shows, drive-in cinemas, and shopping are the activities of the people in this poem. The impression is of everything being new and shiny, modern, full of activity and crowded, until death. It's only the stars behind the drive-in movie screen that have not been tidied up yet, that are not part of the circus.

=== Social Behaviours ===
The changing purchasing patterns and emerging consumerism of the time is very evident in the poem, as is the changing moral behaviours and attitudes. The animal-like behaviours of the actors in the movies, where they "snarled screamed" or made "monsterous love", and the aggressive, competitive behaviour, where to "hit wherever you see a head and kick whoever's down", are seen to be acceptable and normal by the characters in the poem.

In death the main character in the poem is given the illusion of happiness. The morticians gives him back the smile he lost in life and in addition gives him a "healthy tan". Also in death he had no worries about money and no fears about disintegrating, or of having bad breath or his hair falling out, but the "show is over" comparing life to a television show, and he has no materialistic concerns in the grave.

== Critical reception ==
While reviewing the poet's collection Condolences of the Season : Selected Poems in The Canberra Times, Geoff Page noted that "The most important of Dawe's achievements is his being the only Australian poet of any period ever to have developed a convincing personal voice — a voice which is clearly colloquial Australian yet flexible enough to encompass a quite elaborate vocabulary without strain."

== Further publications ==
After the poem's initial publication in No Fixed Address : Poems in 1962, it was reprinted as follows:

- Condolences of the Season : Selected Poems by Bruce Dawe, Longman Cheshire, 1971
- Twelve Poets, 1950-1970 12 Poets, 1950-1970 edited by Alexander Craig, Jacaranda Press, 1971
- Sometimes Gladness : Collected Poems 1954-1978 by Bruce Dawe, Longman Cheshire
- The Penguin Book of Modern Australian Verse edited by Harry Heseltine, Penguin Books, 1981
- The Penguin Book of Australian Satirical Verse edited by Philip Neilson, Penguin, 1986
- Sometimes Gladness : Collected Poems 1954-1987 by Bruce Dawe, Longman Cheshire, 1988
- Sometimes Gladness : Collected Poems, 1954-1992 by Bruce Dawe, Longman Cheshire, 1993
- The Sting in the Wattle : Australian Satirical Verse edited by Philip Neilsen, University of Queensland Press, 1993
- 50 Years of Queensland Poetry : 1940s to 1990s edited by Philip Neilsen and Helen Horton, Central Queensland University Press, 1998
