= Bruce Dawe =

Australian poet and academic (1930–2020)

Bruce Dawe AO
- Born: Donald Bruce Dawe; 15 February 1930; Fitzroy, Victoria
- Died: 1 April 2020 (aged 90); Caloundra, Queensland. Australia
- Writing career
- Language: English
- Years active: 1947–2020
- Notable awards: Officer of the Order of Australia

Donald Bruce Dawe AO (15 February 1930 – 1 April 2020) was an Australian poet and academic. Some critics consider him one of the most influential Australian poets of all time.

Dawe received numerous poetry awards in Australia and was named an Officer of the Order of Australia. He taught literature in universities for over 30 years.

Dawe's poetry collection, Sometimes Gladness, sold over 100,000 copies in several printings.

== Early life ==
Bruce Dawe was born in 1930 in Fitzroy, Victoria. Dawe's paternal ancestors originated in Wyke Regis in Dorset, England. The family moved to Australia in the mid-19th century. His mother was of Lowland Scottish ancestry - she often recited Scottish poems from her childhood.

Dawe's parents came from farming families in Victoria. Dawe was the only one in his family to complete primary school. His parents and four siblings always encouraged him to write poetry (his youngest older sister also wrote poetry).

As a child, Dawe attended six schools. At age 16, he dropped out of Northcote High School in Melbourne without completing his Leaving Certificate. He then worked as a clerk, a labourer, a sales assistant, an office boy in an advertising agency and a copy boy at The Truth and The Sun News-Pictorial. Dawe also worked as a labourer in the Public Works Department, as a tailer-out in various Melbourne saw-mills and as a farm-hand in the Cann River valley.

In 1953, Dawe completed his adult matriculation by part-time study. In 1954, he enrolled at Melbourne University on a teaching scholarship. However, at the end of 1954, he moved to Sydney, working as a labourer in a glass factory and later in a factory manufacturing batteries. Also during 1954, Dawe converted to Catholicism. In 1956, Dawe returned to Melbourne, where he worked as a postman for two years and as a self-employed gardener.

In 1959, Dawe joined the Royal Australian Air Force (RAAF), initially as a trainee telegraphist but remustered as an education assistant. After completing his recruit training at RAAF Base Rathmines, he was posted to Ballarat, Victoria. On commencing duties as an education assistant, Dawe was posted to RAAF Base Wagga, Victoria Barracks Melbourne and Toowoomba, Queensland.

In 1966, Dawe was posted to Malaysia for six months. During this posting, Dawe wrote the lyrics for the school song of the RAAF School on Penang. This song was used until the school’s closing in 1988.

After leaving Malaysia, Dawe returned to Melbourne.

== Teaching ==
Leaving the RAAF in 1968, Dawe began teaching at Downlands College, a Catholic boys college in Toowoomba, Queensland. After teaching English and history at the secondary level for two and a half years, he became a tertiary lecturer in English literature at the Darling Downs Institute of Advanced Education (DDIAE) in Toowoomba.

In 1971, Dawe was appointed as a lecturer at DDIAE. In 1980, he became a senior lecturer at DDIAE. In 1988, Dawe received the inaugural DDIAE Award for Excellence in Teaching. In 1992, when DDIAE became the University of Southern Queensland (USQ), Dawe was appointed associate professor.

In 1993, Dawe retired from full-time teaching and was appointed as the first honorary professor of USQ. He then taught University of the Third Age classes.

Dawe would achieve four university degrees (BA, MLitt, MA, PhD), all completed by part-time study.

In 1999, Dawe endowed the Bruce Dawe National Poetry Prize of $2,500 to be awarded annually to an Australian poets. The endowment is held in trust by the University of Southern Queensland and administered by its Faculty of Arts, judged by the English Literature staff.

== Poetry ==
Dawe wrote poetry about ordinary people in modern Australia, their interests in cars, novels, films and other popular items. He also wrote about abortion, environmental degradation, and the treatment of the Australian Aboriginal community.

In discussing Dawe's poetry, John Kinsella remarked"

Always behind Dawe’s seemingly playful banter with us, his readers and public, is his commitment to sympathy and connection with the less empowered, the disenfranchised, downtrodden, neglected and exploited.

== Personal life ==
On 27 January 1964, Dawe married Gloria Desley Blain, Between December 1964 and July 1969, the couple had four children: Brian, twins Jamie and Katrina, and Melissa. Gloria died in 1997.

Dawe died in Caloundra, Queensland, on 1 April 2020, at age 90.

== Awards ==
- 1965 – Myer Poetry Prize
- 1967 – Ampol Arts Award for Creative Literature
- 1968 – Myer Poetry Prize
- 1973 – Dame Mary Gilmore Medal
- 1978 – Grace Leven Prize for Poetry
- 1979 – Braille Book of the Year
- 1980 – Patrick White Literary Award
- 1984 – Christopher Brennan Award
- 1990 – Paul Harris Fellowship of Rotary International
- 1992 – Officer of the Order of Australia: "In recognition of service to Australian literature, particularly in the field of poetry"
- 1996 – Alumni Award by the University of New England
- 1997 – Philip Hodgins Memorial Medal at the Mildura Writers' Festival
- 2000 – Australian Council for the Arts Emeritus Writers Award
- 2001 – Centenary Medal for "distinguished service to the arts through poetry"

== Bibliography ==
=== Poetry ===
==== Collections ====
- No Fixed Address : poems (F. W. Cheshire, 1962)
- A Need of Similar Name (F. W. Cheshire, 1965)
- An Eye for a Tooth (Cheshire, 1968)
- Beyond the Subdivisions : Poems (F. W. Cheshire, 1969)
- Heat-Wave: Poems (Sweeney Reed, 1970)
- Condolences of the Season : Selected Poems (F. W. Cheshire, 1971)
- Just a Dugong at Twilight: Mainly Light Verse (F. W. Cheshire, 1975)
- Sometimes Gladness : Collected Poems, 1954-1978 (Longman Cheshire, 1978)
- Sometimes Gladness : Collected Poems, 1954-1982 (Longman Cheshire, 1983)
- Selected Poems (London, Longman, 1984)
- Towards Sunrise : Poems, 1979-1986 (Longman Cheshire, 1986)
- Sometimes Gladness : Collected Poems, 1954-1987 (Longman Cheshire, 1988)
- This Side of Silence : Poems 1987–1990 (Longman Cheshire, 1990)
- Sometimes Gladness : Collected Poems, 1954-1992 (Longman Cheshire, 1993)
- Mortal Instruments : Poems 1990–1995 (Longman, 1995)
- Sometimes Gladness : Collected Poems, 1954-1997 (Longman Cheshire, 1997)
- A Poet's People (South Melbourne, Addison Wesley Longman, 1999)
- The Headlong Traffic : Poems and Prose Monologues 1997 to 2002 (Longman, 2003)
- Towards a War: Twelve Reflections (Picaro Press, 2003)
- Sometimes Gladness : Collected Poems, 1954–2005, 6th Edition (Longman Cheshire, 2006)
- Slo-Mo Tsunami and Other Poems (Puncher and Wattmann, 2011)
- Blind Spots (Picaro Press, 2013)
- Kevin Almighty (Picaro Press, 2013)
- Animal Tales (Penguin, 2014)
- Border Security (UWA, 2016)

==== Selected poems ====
Title	Year	First published	Reprinted/collected
"Enter Without So Much as Knocking"	1959	No Fixed Address : Poems by Bruce Dawe, Longman Cheshire, 1962, pp. 11–12	
"And a Good Friday Was Had by All"	1963	Twentieth Century, vol. 18 Spring 1963, pg. 334	Condolences of the Season : Selected Poems, Longman Cheshire, 1971, p. 41
"Homo Suburbiensis"	1964	Twentieth Century, vol. 23 Winter 1969, pg. 357	Condolences of the Season : Selected Poems, Longman Cheshire, 1971, p. 41
"In the New Landscape"	1966	Modern Australian Writing edited by Geoffrey Dutton, Collins, 1966, pp. 35–36	An Eye for a Tooth : Poems, Cheshire, 1968, pp. 22–23
"Homecoming"	1968	The Age, 6 July 1968,	Beyond the Subdivisions : Poems, Cheshire, 1969, p. 2
"Drifters"	1968	Australian Letters vol. 8 no. 1, January 1968	An Eye for a Tooth : Poems, Cheshire, 1968, p. 14
"Miss Mac"	1969		
"Somewhere Friendly"	1969		
"Search and Destroy"	1970		
"Weapons Training"	1970	Quadrant, no. 44 Winter 1970	Condolences of the Season : Selected Poems, Longman Cheshire, 1971, p. 118
"The Corn Flake"	1975		
"Going"	1978		
"The Sadness of Madonas"	1985		
"The Wholly Innocent"	1986	Dawe, Bruce (1986). Towards sunrise : poems, 1979-1986. Melbourne: Longman Cheshire.	Dawe, Bruce (1988). Sometimes gladness : collected poems, 1954-1987. Melbourne: Longman Cheshire.
"The High Mark (for Nick Lynch)"	1987		
"The Beach"	1991		
"Gordon's Quest"	1995	Dawe, Bruce (October 1995). "Gordon's quest". Quadrant. 39 (10): 18.	
Beyond Limbo	1996	Dawe, Bruce (March 1996). "Beyond Limbo". Quadrant. 40 (3): 8.	
A Park in the Balkans	1996	Dawe, Bruce (July–August 1996). "A park in the Balkans". Quadrant. 40 (7–8): 16.	
The Human Moment	1996	Dawe, Bruce (July–August 1996). "The human moment". Quadrant. 40 (7–8): 16.	
Life Cycle	2009		

=== Critical studies, reviews and biography ===
- The Man down the Street, edited by Ian V. Hansen, Melbourne, V.A.T.E., 1972
- Times and Seasons: An Introduction to Bruce Dawe, by Basil Shaw, Melbourne, Cheshire, 1974
- Adjacent Worlds: A Literary Life of Bruce Dawe, by Ken Goodwin, Melbourne, Longman Cheshire, 1988
- Bruce Dawe: Essays and Opinions, edited by K.L. Goodwin, Melbourne, Longman Cheshire, 1990
- Bruce Dawe, by Peter Kuch, Oxford, Oxford University Press, 1995 .
- Attuned to Alien Moonlight: The Poetry of Bruce Dawe, by Dennis Haskell, St Lucia, UQP, 2002
