= Margaret Senior =

Australian wildlife illustrator (1917–1995)

Margaret Senior OAM
- Born: 1917; London, England
- Died: 25 January 1995 (aged 77–78); Sydney, New South Wales
- Citizenship: Australian
- Occupation: lllustrator
- Awards: Children's Book of the Year Award: Older Readers 1952

Margaret Senior OAM (1917 – 25 January 1995) was an English/Australian Natural History, Wildlife and Children's Book Illustrator. She contributed to a significant portion of early Illustration of Australia's exploration of rich natural Fauna and Flora. Her works are held in the collections of New South Wales Department of Primary Industries Orange Scientific Collections Unit and The University of Newcastle Special Collections Archives. She created numerous Illustrated posters and Botanical Plates for the NSW National Parks and Wildlife Service. Her illustrations were heavily used by parks and Wildlife, including Bushfire prevention posters.

Growing up in London Senior moved to Australia in the 1940's. She left a bequest of $50,000 gift left to the University of Newcastle. Known for its Bachelor of Illustration (Natural History) established in 2003. This was up until the Bachelor of Natural History Illustration its disestablishment in 2019. Senior also left the copyright of her published work to the University, including a large number of her original artworks. She contributed $10,000 during her lifetime to the Margaret Senior Wildlife Illustration Award for one excellent graduating student each year.

Senior was awarded the Medal of the Order of Australia in the 1988 Queen's Birthday Honours List for services to wildlife conservation.

== Illustrated books ==
Senior illustrated numerous books during her career. Most notably 'The Australia Book' which won the 1952 Children's Book of the Year Award: Older Readers.

Year	Title	Author	Illustrator	Publisher
1950	Little Brown Piccaninnies of Tasmania	Jane Ada Fletcher	Margaret Senior	John Sands Ltd.
1950	The story of Kurri Kurri the Kookaburra	Leslie Rees AM	Margaret Senior	John Sands Ltd.
1951	Two-Thumbs : the story of a koala	Leslie Rees AM	Margaret Senior	John Sands Ltd.
1952	The Australia Book	Eve Pownall	Margaret Senior	John Sands Ltd.
1952	Bush Haven Animals: An Australian picture story	Margaret Senior	Margaret Senior	John Sands Ltd.
1955	Cousins-come-lately: adventures in old Sydney town	Eve Pownall	Margaret Senior	Shakespeare Head Press
1955	John of the Sirius	Doris Chadwick	Margaret Senior	Thomas Nelson and Sons
1957	The story of Koonaworra the black Swan	Leslie Rees AM	Margaret Senior	John Sands Ltd.
1958	Snow boy	Noreen Shelley	Margaret Senior	John Sands Ltd
1962	Plants without Flowers	Thistle Y. Harris	Margaret Senior	Longmans
1962	John and Nanbaree	Doris Chadwick	Margaret Senior	Thomas Nelson
1967	Henry Lawson	Ken Levis	Margaret Senior	Longmans
1967	Larry : the story of an Australian seagull	Ina Watson	Margaret Senior	John Sands Ltd
1977	A field guide to the common sea & estuary fishes of non-tropical Australia	James Nils Thomson	Margaret Senior	Collins
1985	Two at Sullivan Bay	Nance Donkin	Margaret Senior	Roo Books
1985	Nunga	Rus Center	Margaret Senior	Kangaroo Press
1987	Australia's animals	Margaret Senior	Margaret Senior	Kangaroo Press
