= R. D. Fitzgerald =

Australian poet

Robert David FitzGerald III AM OBE (22 February 1902 – 24 May 1987) was an Australian poet.

== Biography ==
FitzGerald was born in Hunters Hill, New South Wales, a third-generation Australian of Irish extraction, and studied science at the University of Sydney. He left before graduating, however, and followed in the footsteps of both his father and grandfather Robert D. FitzGerald by taking up a post as a surveyor. In the 1930s he travelled to Fiji where he worked the Native Lands Commission, surveying tribal boundaries, an experience important to his poetry. He spent World War II doing engineering surveys in New South Wales and working for the Australian Department of the Interior (from 1939 to 1965).

FitzGerald's poetry, together with that of Kenneth Slessor, was an important modernist influence on Australian literature of the late 1920s and 1930s, being at once more serious and more workmanlike than much of the poetry of the period. Jack Lindsay wrote of them:

FitzGerald and Slessor were the poets who were to carry on in their own ways the impetus begotten by Vision and in the 1930s to dominate Australian poetry, lifting it definitively to a new level of intellectual responsibility and ending once for all the reign of the slipshod, the pedestrian and the emotionally inchoate.

In later life, too, FitzGerald was influential, not only through his poetry but as a lecturer and reviewer. He died in Glen Innes, New South Wales, aged eighty-four.

== Bibliography ==
=== Poetry collections ===
- To Meet the Sun (1926)
- The Greater Apollo : Seven Metaphysical Songs (1927)
- Moonlight Acre (1938)
- This Night's Orbit : Verses (1953)
- Southmost Twelve (1962)
- Robert D. Fitzgerald : Selection and introduction by the author (1963)
- Of Some Country : 27 Poems (1963)
- Forty Years' Poems (1965)
- R. D. Fitzgerald Reads From His Own Work (1971)
- Product : Later Verses (1977)
- Some Poems of R. D. Fitzgerald (1983)

=== Single poem volumes ===
- Heemskerck Shoals (1944)
- Between Two Tides (1952)
- The Wind at Your Door (1958)
- One Such Morning (1966)

=== Edited ===
- Australian Poetry 1942 (1942)
- Mary Gilmore (1963)
- The Letters of Hugh McCrae (1970)

=== Essays ===
- Of Places and Poetry (1976)

=== Criticism ===
- The Elements of Poetry (1963)

=== Drama ===
- Time Wasted : A Play (1926)

== Awards ==
- 1928 Panton Arts Club (UK), Festival of Arts and Letters Bronze Medal, winner for To Meet the Sun
- 1938 Australian Literature Society Poetry Gold Medal winner for Moonlight Acre
- 1938 Australia's Sesquicentenary Celebration Long Poem Prize, winner for Essay on Memory
- 1951 Officer of the Order of the British Empire for services to literature
- 1952 Grace Leven Prize for Poetry winner for Between Two Tides
- 1959 Grace Leven Prize for Poetry winner for The Wind at Your Door : A Poem
- 1962 Grace Leven Prize for Poetry winner for Southmost Twelve
- 1974 Robert Frost Medallion (now known as Christopher Brennan Award)
- 1982 Member of the Order of Australia (AM) for services to literature
