= 1968 in Australian literature =

This article presents a list of the historical events and publications of Australian literature during 1968.

== Major publications ==
=== Books ===
- Thea Astley – A Boat Load of Home Folk
- Kenneth Cook – The Wine of God's Anger
- Frank Dalby Davison – The White Thorntree
- Geoffrey Dutton – Andy
- David Ireland – The Chantic Bird
- Thomas Keneally – Three Cheers for the Paraclete
- Norman Lindsay – Rooms and Houses
- John O'Grady – Gone Troppo
- F. J. Thwaites – Sky Full of Thunder
- Morris West – The Tower of Babel

=== Short stories ===
- Louise Elizabeth Rorabacher – Aliens in Their Land : The Aborigine in the Australian Short Story (edited)
- Patrick White – "Five-Twenty"
- Michael Wilding – "Joe's Absence"

=== Science fiction and fantasy ===
- John Baxter – The Pacific Book of Australian Science Fiction (edited)
- A. Bertram Chandler – Spartan Planet (aka False Fatherland)

=== Children's and Young Adult fiction ===
- Margaret Balderson – When Jays Fly to Barbmo
- Nan Chauncy – Lizzie Lights
- Mavis Thorpe Clark – Spark of Opal
- Elyne Mitchell – Moon Filly
- Ruth Park – The Sixpenny Island
- Ivan Southall – Let the Balloon Go
- Joan Woodberry
  - Ash Tuesday
  - Come Back Peter
- Patricia Wrightson – I Own the Racecourse!

=== Poetry ===
- David Campbell
  - "The Australian Dream"
  - Selected Poems 1942–1968
- Bruce Dawe
  - An Eye for a Tooth : Poems
  - "Drifters"
  - "Homecoming"
- Gwen Harwood – Poems : Volume Two
- Dorothy Hewett
  - Windmill Country
  - "The Witnesses"
- James McAuley – "Because"
- Randolph Stow – "The Singing Bones"

=== Drama ===
- David Williamson – The Indecent Exposure of Anthony East

=== Biography ===
- T. Inglis Moore – Rolf Boldrewood
- Colin Thiele – Heysen of Hahndorf

=== Non-fiction ===
- Gavin Souter – A Peculiar People : The Australians in Paraguay
- Margaret Fulton – The Margaret Fulton Cookbook

== Awards and honours ==
=== Literary ===
Award	Author	Title	Publisher
ALS Gold Medal	No award		
Colin Roderick Award	Gavin Souter	A Peculiar People : The Australians in Paraguay	Angus and Robertson
Miles Franklin Award	Thomas Keneally	Three Cheers for the Paraclete	Angus and Robertson

=== Children and Young Adult ===
Award	Category	Author	Title	Publisher
Children's Book of the Year Award	Older Readers	Ivan Southall	To the Wild Sky	Angus and Robertson
Children's Book of the Year Award	Picture Book	No award		

=== Poetry ===
Award	Author	Title	Publisher
Grace Leven Prize for Poetry	David Campbell	Selected Poems 1942–1968	Angus and Robertson

== Births ==
A list, ordered by date of birth (and, if the date is either unspecified or repeated, ordered alphabetically by surname) of births in 1968 of Australian literary figures, authors of written works or literature-related individuals follows, including year of death.

- 23 February — Sonya Hartnett, novelist
- 2 April — Sofie Laguna, novelist

Unknown date

- Azhar Abidi, novelist (born in Wah, Pakistan)
- Anita Heiss, academic and critic
- James Roy, writer of young adult and children's fiction
- Chris Womersley, novelist

== Deaths ==
A list, ordered by date of death (and, if the date is either unspecified or repeated, ordered alphabetically by surname) of deaths in 1968 of Australian literary figures, authors of written works or literature-related individuals follows, including year of birth.

- 14 January – Dorothea Mackellar, poet (born 1885)
- 8 March — Henrietta Drake-Brockman, journalist and novelist (born 1901)
- 9 June – Bernard Cronin, novelist (born 1884)

== See also ==
- 1968 in Australia
- 1968 in literature
- 1968 in poetry
- List of years in Australian literature
- List of years in literature
