= 1968 in poetry =

Nationality words link to articles with information on the nation's poetry or literature (for instance, Irish or France).

== Events ==
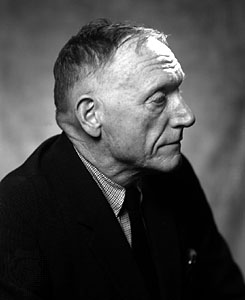
Robert Penn Warren in 1968

- January 1 – Cecil Day-Lewis is announced as the new Poet Laureate of the UK.
- May 19 – The Last Poets, originally comprising Felipe Luciano, Gylan Kain and David Nelson, form at Marcus Garvey Park in East Harlem, New York City, on Malcolm X's birthday.
- November 23 – Roy Fuller is elected professor of poetry at Oxford University (with 385 votes) to succeed Edmund Blunden, who unexpectedly left. Other nominees were Kathleen Raine, Enid Starkie and Yevgeni Yevtushenko.
- The Arvon Foundation is established by young poets John Fairfax and John Moat in the UK to promote creative writing.
- The Belfast Group, a grouping of poets in Belfast, Northern Ireland, which was started in 1963 in poetry and lapsed in 1966 when founder Philip Hobsbaum left for Glasgow, is reconstituted this year by Michael Allen, Arthur Terry, and Seamus Heaney. At various times, the group also includes Michael Longley, James Simmons, Paul Muldoon, Ciaran Carson, Stewart Parker, Bernard MacLaverty and the critic Edna Longley. Meetings are held at Seamus and Marie Heaney's house on Ashley Avenue. The group will last until 1972.
- The first translations and book-length discussion of Enheduanna's work is published. She is a Sumerian priestess and poet of the 23rd century BC and the earliest named author known to history.
- The Honest Ulsterman, a long-running Northern Ireland literary magazine, is established this year by James Simmons. It is then edited for 20 years by Frank Ormsby.

== Works published in English ==
Listed by nation where the work was first published and again by the poet's native land, if different; substantially revised works listed separately:

=== Australia ===
- David Campbell, Selected Poems 1942–1968
- Bruce Dawe
  - An Eye for a Tooth : Poems
  - "Drifters"
  - "Homecoming"
- Rodney Hall and Thomas Shapcott, editors, New Impulses in Australian Poetry, anthology
- Gwen Harwood, Poems : Volume Two
- Dorothy Hewett
  - Windmill Country
  - "The Witnesses"
- James McAuley, "Because"

=== Canada ===
- Leonard Cohen, Selected Poems, 1956-1968
- Irving Layton, The Shattered Plinths, 60 new poems.
- Dennis Lee, Civil Elegies. Toronto: Anansi.
- Dorothy Livesay, The Documentaries. Poems from the 1930s and 1940s, and including "Roots", a long poem
- Pat Lowther, This Difficult Flowering
- Jay Macpherson, The Boatman and Other Poems. Toronto: Oxford UP.
- E. J. Pratt, Selected Poems of E. J. Pratt, Peter Buitenhuis ed., Toronto: Macmillan.
- Al Purdy, Wild Grape Wine
- Joe Rosenblatt, Winter of the Luna Moth. Toronto: Anansi.
- W.W.E. Ross, Shapes & sounds: poems of W. W. E. Ross (with a portrait by Dennis Burton, a memoir by Barry Callaghan, and an editorial note by Raymond Souster and John Robert Colombo). (Toronto: Longman's)
- Raymond Souster, Lost and Found: Uncollected Poems. Toronto: Clarke, Irwin.

Anthologies in Canada

- Mary Alice Downie and Barbara Robertson, editors, The Wind Has Wings, anthology of 77 Canadian poems for children
- Dennis Lee, editor, T.O. Now, anthology of 13 "apprentice poets living in Toronto"

=== India in English ===
- R. ParthasarathyPoetry from Leeds ( Poetry in English ). Leeds: Oxford University Press, UK 1968.
- G. S. Sharat Chandra, Bharat Natyam Dancer and Other Poems ( Poetry in English ), Calcutta: Writers Workshop, India .
- Deb Kumar Das, The Eye of Autumn: An Experiment in Poetry ( Poetry in English ), Calcutta: Writers Workshop, India'
- Ira De, The Hunt and Other Poems, revised edition, ( Poetry in English ), Calcutta: Writers Workshop, India (see also first edition 1961)
- Gauri Deshpande, Between Births ( Poetry in English ), Calcutta: Writers Workshop, India
- Indira Devi Dhanrajgir, Partings in Mimosa, Hyderabad
- Guari Deshpande, Between Births ( Poetry in English ), Calcutta: Writers Workshop, India
- Paul Jacob, Sonnets ( Poetry in English ), Calcutta: Writers Workshop, India
- S. R. Mokashi-Punekar, P. Lal: An Appreciation( Poetry in English ), Calcutta: Writers Workshop, India
- Dom Moraes, My Son's Father, autobiography
- Srinavas Rayaprol, Bones & Distances( Poetry in English ), Calcutta: Writers Workshop, India
- Pradip Sen, And Then the Sun, revised edition (first edition, 1960, ( Poetry in English ), Calcutta: Writers Workshop, India
- Vinay K. Varma, Poppies and Ashes
- Swami Vivekananda, Search of God and Other Poems, Calcutta: Advaita Ashram
- Suniti Namjoshi and Sarojini Namjoshi, translators, Poems of Govindagraj, translated from Marathi, Calcutta: Writers Workshop, India

=== United Kingdom ===
- W. H. Auden:
  - Collected Longer Poems
  - Secondary Worlds, lecture given in October
  - Selected Poems
- Dannie Abse, A Small Desperation
- Kingsley Amis, A Look Round the Estate
- Edward Brathwaite, Masks
- Basil Bunting, Collected Poems
- Charles Causley, Underneath the Water
- Stewart Conn, Stoats in Sunlight
- Tony Connor, Kon in Springtime
- Maureen Duffy, Lyrics for the Dog Hour
- D. J. Enright, Unlawful Assembly
- Gavin Ewart, The Deceptive Grin of the Gravel Porters
- James Fenton, Our Western Furniture
- Roy Fuller, New Poems
- William R. P. George - Cerddi'r Neraig
- Zulfikar Ghose, Jets from Orange
- Robert Graves, Poems 1965–1968
- Harry Guest, Arrangements
- John Heath-Stubbs, Satires and Epigrams
- Adrian Henri, Tonight at Noon
- John Hewitt, Northern Irish poet published in the United Kingdom, The Day of the Corncrake
- Norman Jackson, Beyond the Habit of Sense
- A. Norman Jeffares, A New Commentary On The Poems Of W.B. Yeats, criticism
- James Kirkup, Paper Windows
- George MacBeth, The Night of Stones
- Norman MacCaig, Rings on a Tree
- Derek Mahon, Night-Crossing, Oxford University Press
- Adrian Mitchell, Out Loud
- Edwin Morgan, The Second Life, his first collection and the first in Britain to be typeset by computer
- Richard Murphy, The Battle of Aughrim
- Ruth Pitter, Poems 1926–1966
- J. H. Prynne, Kitchen Poems
- Edith Anne Robertson, Translations Into the Scots Tongue of Poems By Gerard Manley Hopkins
- Muriel Spark, Collected Poems Volume 1
- R. S. Thomas, Not That He Brought Flowers
- J. R. R. Tolkien, The Road Goes Ever On, first published in the United States 1967
- Vernon Watkins, Fidelities

==== Anthologies in the United Kingdom ====
- John Bishop, Music and Sweet Poetry, poems about music
- Howard Sergeant, Poetry from Africa (published in the United Kingdom), including work from Gabriel Okara (Nigeria), Gaston Bart-Williams (Sierra Leone), Kwesi Brew (Ghana) and David Rubadiri (Malawi)
- Jean Sergeant and Howard Sergeant, Poems from Hospital
- Joan Murray Simpson, Without Adam: The Femina Anthology of Poetry, poems by women

=== United States ===
- James Agee, The Collected Poems of James Agee, including 60 poems previously unpublished in books (posthumous)
- A. R. Ammons, Selected Poems
- Paul Blackburn, In. On. Or About The Premises
- Gwendolyn Brooks, In the Mecca
- Raymond Carver, Near Klamath
- Stanley Cooperman, The Day of the Parrot and Other Poems
- Robert Creeley, Pieces
- Ed Dorn and Gordon Brotherston, translators, Our Word: Guerilla Poems From Latin America, Grossman
- Ed Dorn, Gunslinger, Black Sparrow Press
- Robert Duncan, Bending the Bow
- Allen Ginsberg, T.V. Baby Poems
- John Hollander, Types of Shape
- Etheridge Knight, Poems from Prison
- Rod McKuen, Lonesome Cities
- Archibald MacLeish, The Wild Wicked Old Man and Other Poems
- Ogden Nash, There's Always Another Windmill
- Howard Nemerov, The Winter Lightning: Selected Poems
- Lorine Niedecker, North Central (Fulcrum Press: London)
- Ned O'Gorman, The Harversters' Vase
- George Oppen, Of Being Numerous
- Kenneth Rexroth, Collected Longer Poems
- Charles Reznikoff, second Testimony collection
- Aram Saroyan, Aram Saroyan, Random House
- Karl Shapiro, Selected Poems (more than 200, including 25 previously unpublished)
- L. E. Sissman, Dying: An Introduction
- Mark Strand, Reasons for Moving, Canadian native published in the United States
- Alice Walker, Once

==== Anthologies in the United States ====
- Paul Carroll, editor, The Young American Poets, anthology of 54 poets
- LeRoi Jones and Larry Neal, editors, Black Fire, an anthology of African-American poetry
- Phyllis McGinley, editor, Wonders and Surprises, anthology for juveniles, including poems by Elinor Wylie, E. B. White, Langston Hughes and T. S. Eliot

=== Other in English ===
- Edward Brathwaite, Masks, second part of his The Arrivants trilogy, which also includes Rights of Passage (1967) and Islands (1969), Caribbean
- Kendrick Smithyman, Flying to Palmerston, Christchurch: Auckland University & Oxford University Press, New Zealand
- Richard Murphy, The Battle of Aughrim, Ireland

== Works published in other languages ==
Listed by language and often by nation where the work was first published and again by the poet's native land, if different; substantially revised works listed separately:

=== Denmark ===
- Per Højholt, Turbo
- Hans Jørgen Nielsen, Fra luften i munden
- Thorkild Bjørnvig, Ravnen

=== French language ===
==== Canada, in French ====
- Jean-Guy Pilon, Comme eau retenue : poèmes 1954-1963, Montréal: l'Hexagone
- Yves Préfontaine, Pays sans parole

==== France ====
- P. Albert-Birot, Poètes d'aujourd'hui (posthumous), edited by J. Follain
- Marc Alyn, La Nuit majeure
- J. Berthet:
  - Poèsiepures
  - Quelconqueries
- J. Bancal, L'Épreuve du feu
- André du Bouchet, OU LE SOLEIL
- A. Bosquet, Quatre Testaments et autres poèmes
- Andrée Chedid, Contre–Chant
- Rene Char, Dans la pluie giboyeuse
- C. Fourcade, De Lumière et de nuit
- L. Foucher, Argyne et les Gypaètes, third part of a trilogy
- André Frénaud, La Sainte Face
- Armel Lubin, Feux contre feux
- F. Millepierres, Cheval noir et cheval blanc
- Raymond Queneau, Battre la campagne
- G. Puel, La Lumière du jour
- Denis Roche, Éros énergumène
- Jean Tardieu, Le Fleuve caché

=== German language ===
- Paul Celan, Threadsuns (Fadensonnen)

=== Hebrew ===
- A. Shlonsky, Mishiai ha-Perozdor ha-Aroch ("From the Poems of the Long Corridor")
- A. Gilboa, Lichtov Siftai Yeshainim ("To Write from the Lips of the Sleepers"), Israel
- Haim Gouri, Tenua le-Maga ("A Move to Touch")
- A. Halfi, Mivhar Shirimx ("Selected Poems")
- A. Kovner, Ahot Ketana ("Little Sister")
- B. Galai, Massa Zafonah ("Northward Journey")
- D. Pagis, Shirai Levi Ibn Altabban (prose), a study of the Medieval Hebrew poet's work

=== India ===
Listed in alphabetical order by first name:

- Buddhidhari Singha, Sarasayya, a long poem published as a book; Maithili-language
- Nilmani Phookan, Aru Ki Naisabda, Guwahati, Assam: Dutta Barua; India, Assamese-language
- Varavara Rao (better known as "VV"), Chali Negallu or Chalinegallu ("Camp Fires"), Hanamkonda: Svecha Sahiti; India, Telugu-language

=== Italy ===
- Giorgio Vigolo, La luce ricorda, collection of poems from 1923 and after
- Sergio Solmi, Dal balcone
- Giovanni Testori, L'amore
- Giuseppe Guglielmi, Panglosse blandimentis oramentis coeteris meretriciis
- Andrea Zalzotto, La beltà
- Franco Fortini, Una volta per sempre
- Angela Giannitrapani, Professione di poesia

=== Norway ===
- Arnulf Øverland, De hundrede fioliner: Dikt i utvalg (posthumous)
- Tor Obrestad, Vårt daglige brød
- Arnljot Eggen, Roller og røynd
- Hallvard Lie, Norsk verslære, a scholarly study on Norwegian poetry

=== Portuguese language ===
==== Brazil ====
- João Cabral de Melo Neto, Complete Works
- Augusto de Campos, Haroldo de Campos and Boris Schnaiderman, editors:
  - An anthology of modern Russian poetry from Symbolism to the present in Portuguese
  - Traduzir e Trovar, an anthology of translated poetry, including poetry from France, Italy and England.

===== Criticism and theory =====
- Augusto de Campos, O balanço da Bossa, a study of the relationship of Brazilian popular music to "vanguardist" poetry
- Luiz Costa Lima, Lira e Antilira, essays on modern Brazilian poetry
- Décio Pignatari, Informação, Linguagem, Communicação, critical study of vanguardist art and mass culture

=== Russia ===
- Aleksandr Tvardovsky, Selected Lyrics 1959-67
- Alexander Mezhirov, Лебяжий переулок ("Swan's Lane"), Russia, Soviet Union
- Robert Rozhdestvensky, Poem from Various Points of View
- Yaroslav Smelyakov, December, poems published serially in the periodical Friendship Between the Peoples last year and this year

=== Spanish language ===
- Rafael Méndez Dorich, Cantos Rodados (Lima), Peru
- Nicanor Parra, Canciones rusas, Chile
- Emma Godoy, a book interpreting of "Muerte sin fin" by José Gorostiza, Mexico

=== Sweden ===
- Lars Forssell, a book of poetry
- Johannes Edfelt, a book of poetry
- Petter Bergman, a book of poetry
- Lars Gustalfsson, a book of poetry

=== Yiddish ===
==== United States ====
- Jacob Glatstein, a book of poems
- Aaron Zeitlin, Poems of the Holocaust and Poems of Faith
- Ephraim Auerbach, a book of poems
- Israel Jacob Schwartz, a book of poems
- Itsik Manger, a book of poems
- Eliezer Greenberg, a book of poems
- Rachel Korn, a book of poems
- Aaron Glanz-Leyeles, I Do Remember (posthumous)

==== Israel ====
- Malka Locker, a book of poems
- Leyb Olitski, a book of poems
- Avrom Lev, a book of poems
- I. Manik, a book of poems
- Binem Heller, a book of poems
- Rivka Basman Ben-Hayim, a book of poems
- Abraham Sutzkever, Square Letters and Miracles

==== Soviet Union ====
- Itsik Feffer, a book of poems
- Ziame Telesin, a book of poems
- Mendl Lifshits, a book of poems

==== Poland ====
- Eliyohu Reyzman, a book of poems
- Paltiel Tsibulski, a book of poems (posthumous)

=== Other languages ===
- Nizar Qabbani, Diary of an Indifferent Woman, Syrian poet writing in Arabic

== Awards and honors ==
=== Australia ===
- Grace Leven Prize for Poetry: David Campbell, Selected Poems 1942–1968

=== Canada ===
- See 1968 Governor General's Awards for a complete list of winners and finalists for those awards.
- Canadian Centennial Commission poetry competition: First prize: Margaret Atwood, The Animals in That Country

=== United Kingdom ===
- Cholmondeley Award: Harold Massingham, Edwin Morgan
- Eric Gregory Award: James Aitchison, Douglas Dunn, Brian Jones
- Queen's Gold Medal for Poetry: Robert Graves

=== United States ===
- American Academy of Arts and Letters Gold Medal in Poetry, W. H. Auden
- Consultant in Poetry to the Library of Congress (later the post would be called "Poet Laureate Consultant in Poetry to the Library of Congress"): William Jay Smith appointed this year.
- National Book Award for Poetry: Robert Bly, The Light Around the Body
- Pulitzer Prize for Poetry: Anthony Hecht, The Hard Hours
- Fellowship of the Academy of American Poets: Stanley Kunitz

== Births ==
- July 2 – A. E. Stallings, American poet
- Dates not known:
  - Mark Bibbins, American poet
  - Nan Cohen, American poet
  - Jun Er, Chinese poet
  - Patrick McGuinness, English poet and academic
  - Michael Teig, American poet

== Deaths ==
Birth years link to the corresponding "[year] in poetry" article:

- January 1 – Donagh MacDonagh, 55, Irish poet, playwright and judge
- January 13 – William Williams (Crwys), 93, Welsh poet
- January 14 – Dorothea Mackellar, 82, Australian poet and writer
- January 18 – Gamel Woolsey, 72, American poet and writer, in Spain
- January 20 – David Derek Stacton, 42, American novelist, historian and poet
- January 25 – Yvor Winters, 67, American literary critic and poet
- February 16 – Jaime Sabartés, 55, Spanish poet and longtime secretary to Pablo Picasso
- March 16 – Gunnar Ekelöf, 60, Swedish poet
- March 25 – Arnulf Øverland, 78, Norwegian poet
- April 26 – Donald Davidson, 74, American poet, essayist, social and literary critic and author, organizer of the Nashville circle of poets called the Fugitives and an overlapping group, the Southern Agrarians
- April 28 – Winfield Townley Scott, 58, American poet
- May – Erik Lindegren 58, Swedish poet
- May 9 – George Dillon, 62, American poet and editor
- June 1 – Witter Bynner, 86, American poet, writer and scholar
- June 8 – Mira Mendelson, 53 (born 1915), Russian poet, writer, translator and librettist, heart attack
- June 12 – Sir Herbert Read, 74, English poet and critic of literature and art
- June 14 – Salvatore Quasimodo, 66, Italian poet
- June 17 – Aleksei Kruchenykh, 82, Russian Futurist poet
- November 17 – Mervyn Peake, 57, British modernist writer, artist, poet and illustrator
- December 10 – Thomas Merton, 53 (born 1915), American poet, author and Roman Catholic monk, in a freak accident in a visit to Bangkok, Thailand
- December 24 – D. Gwenallt Jones, 69, Welsh poet
- date not known – Eckart Peterich (born 1900), German poet

== See also ==
- Poetry
- List of poetry awards
- List of years in poetry
