= On the Boundary =

Poem by J. S. Manifold

- by J. S. Manifold
- Country: Australia
- Language: English
- Publisher: Overland, Autumn 1959
- Publication date: 1959
- Lines: 28

"On the Boundary" is a poem by Australian poet J. S. Manifold.

It was first published in Overland magazine in Autumn 1959 and later in several of the author's poetry collections and a number of other Australian poetry anthologies.

== Outline ==
While "young McIvor" is riding the boundary of his employer's property he encounters an Aboriginal woman who he tries to seduce with promises of "tucker, baccy, drink of wine". But she will have none of it and he rides off contemplating a piece of family information she has imparted to him.

== Critical reception ==
In his commentary on the poem in 60 Classic Australian Poems Geoff Page noted "Essentially, the story we're told is humorous but we soon sense some serious undertones, some of which even the poet himself may have been unaware of...it's on the boundary of the comic and the tragic."

== Further publications ==
After its initial publication in Overland in 1959 the poem was reprinted as follows:

- Nightmares and Sunhorses by J. S. Manifold, Overland Press, 1961
- Australian Letters, 4 February 1967
- The Vital Decade : Ten Years of Australian Art and Letters edited by Geoffrey Dutton and Max Harris, Sun Books, 1968
- The Land's Meaning edited by L. M. Hannan and B. A. Breen, Macmillan, 1973
- Collected Verse by J. S. Manifold, University of Queensland Press, 1978
- On My Selection : Poems by John Manifold Chosed by the Author by J. S. Manifold, Bibliophile Books, 1983
- 60 Classic Australian Poems edited by Geoff Page, University of NSW Press, 2009

== See also ==
- 1959 in poetry
- 1959 in literature
- 1959 in Australian literature
- Australian literature
