= 60 Classic Australian Poems =

2009 Australian poetry anthology

- Author: Geoff Page
- Language: English
- Genre: Poetry anthology
- Publisher: University of New South Wales Press
- Publication date: 2009
- Publication place: Australia
- Media type: Print
- Pages: 311 pp.
- ISBN: 9781921410796

60 Classic Australian Poems is an anthology of poems edited by Australian writer Geoff Page, published by Hardie Grant Books in 2008.

The collection contains 60 poems from various sources and a commentary on each from the editor.

== Contents ==
- "The Sick Stockrider", Adam Lindsay Gordon
- "The Travelling Post Office", A. B. Paterson
- "Nationality", Mary Gilmore
- "Middleton's Rouseabout", Henry Lawson
- "Towards the Source : 1894-97 : 2", Christopher Brennan
- "The Orange Tree", John Shaw Neilson
- "The Play (The Sentimental Bloke)", C. J. Dennis
- "I'm Like All Lovers" (aka "Poems XIV"), Lesbia Harford
- "Beach Burial", Kenneth Slessor
- "The Wind at Your Door", Robert D. FitzGerald
- "The Mayan Books", A. D. Hope
- "The Commercial Traveller's Wife", Ronald McCuaig
- "The Children March", Elizabeth Riddell
- "Baiamai's Never-Failing Stream", William Hart-Smith
- "Mapooram", Roland Robinson
- "Death of a Whale", John Blight
- "Leopard-Skin", Douglas Stewart
- "On the Boundary", J. S. Manifold
- "Remittance Man", Judith Wright
- "Windy Gap", David Campbell
- "Because", James McAuley
- "Suburban Sonnet", Miriam Stone
- "The Three Fates", Rosemary Dobson
- "Gifts", Oodgeroo Noonuccal
- "The Witnesses", Dorothy Hewett
- "Harry", Francis Webb
- "Experiment", Bruce Beaver
- "Mort aux Chats", Peter Porter
- "Secret Policeman", Vincent Buckley
- "Drifters", Bruce Dawe
- "The Year of the Foxes", David Malouf
- "Other People", Chris Wallace-Crabbe
- "Flying Fox", Thomas Shapcott
- "There Was a Time", Randolph Stow
- "In-Flight Note", Judith Rodriguez
- "The Mitchells", Les Murray
- "Mousepoem", J. S. Harry
- "In Town for the March", Clive James
- "Parenthood", Geoffrey Lehmann
- "To a Married Man", Kate Llewellyn
- "Young Woman Gathering Lemons", Jan Owen
- "The Publisher's Apprentice", Geoff Page
- "North Light", John Tranter
- "Canticle for the Bicentennial Dead", Robert Adamson
- "The Dying Light", Robert Gray
- "Portrait of the Artist as an Old Man", Michael Dransfield
- "Eclipse", Alex Skovron
- "A World of Our Own", Alan Wearne
- "A U Boat Morning, 1914", Alan Gould
- "Costume Jewellery", Jennifer Maiden
- "Europe: A Guide for Ken Searle (Europe: A Guide)", John Forbes
- "Another Country", Stephen Edgar
- "The Last Day", Kevin Hart
- "Exuberance with Bloody Hands", Dorothy Porter
- "Woman Playing the Glass Harmonica", Jennifer Harrison
- "Bahadour", Judith Beveridge
- "The Drive", Anthony Lawrence
- "Shooting the Dogs", Philip Hodgins
- "Drowning in Wheat", John Kinsella
- "Girls' Night on Long Island", Bronwyn Lea

== Critical reception ==
Michael Sharkey, writing in the Journal of the Association for the Study of Australian Literature called the anthology "a brave effort to display the development and achievement of a body or [sic] work that will bear comparison with any in the 'Anglosphere'," noting that Page's definition of the world 'classic' "is flexible enough to admit contemporary works that he would happily take with him into the future or which assist his getting there."

In The Age, Owen Richardson noted that Geoff Page "provides thoughtful commentary on his chosen poems," although "his desire to be clear and straightforward can sometimes result in over-explanation."

== See also ==
- 2009 in Australian literature
