= Eugene B. Redmond =

American poet, and academic (born 1937)

- Born: December 1, 1937 (age 88); St. Louis, Missouri
- Education: Southern Illinois University (SIU); Washington University in St. Louis
- Occupations: Poet, academic
- Writing career
- Genre: Poetry

Eugene B. Redmond (born December 1, 1937, St. Louis) is an American poet, and academic. His poetry is closely connected to the Black Arts Movement and the city of East St. Louis, Illinois.

== Life ==
Eugene B. Redmond was born in St. Louis, Missouri. He earned his bachelor's degree from Southern Illinois University (SIU) in 1964, and his master's degree from Washington University in St. Louis in 1966, both in English Literature. He became a teacher-counselor at Southern Illinois University's Experiment in Higher Education, in East St. Louis, where he worked under the direction of Dr. Edward W. Crosby, his mentor, until 1969. He left SIU to teach at Oberlin College for a year, and then joined the faculty at California State University, Sacramento as a professor of English. In 1985 he returned to East St. Louis as the special assistant to the superintendent for cultural and language arts at the East St. Louis School District until 1989. He taught at Wayne State University (1989–90), before joining the faculty at Southern Illinois University Edwardsville (SIUE), where he is currently an emeritus professor of English.

Redmond’s published works include a pamphlet poem and six poetry collections, as well as numerous contributions to journals and anthologies. He has edited two anthologies of African-American poetry and eight works by Henry Dumas. Dumas had taught at nearby Hiram College before he was shot down in a New York subway, in a case of mistaken identity. It was Dr Crosby who pushed to have SIU put Dumas's writings into publication and urged Redmond to edit the works, which Redmond continues to do to this day.

In 1976, Redmond was named Poet Laureate of East St. Louis.

Redmond published his survey and analysis of 200 years of African-American poetry, Drumvoices: The Mission of Afro-American Poetry, A Critical History, in 1976. He is the founding editor of Drumvoices Revue, a multicultural literary journal jointly published by the English Department of Southern Illinois University Edwardsville and the Eugene B. Redmond Writers Club.

Redmond has donated his collection, comprising his personal library, manuscripts, photographs, posters, and other ephemera, to SIUE Lovejoy Library. Selections from the collection have been made available in the online collection EBR African American Cultural Life. Other papers are held at the University of Illinois at Springfield.

== Awards ==
- National Endowment for the Arts Creative Writing Fellowship
- Lifetime Achievement Award from Pan-African Movement USA
- Pushcart Prize: Best of Small Presses
- Tribute to an Elder from the African Poetry Theater of NYC
- 1993 American Book Award for The Eye in the Ceiling: Selected Poems

== Works ==
- A Tale of Time & Toilet Tissue. 1969.
- Sentry of the Four Golden Pillars. 1970.
- River of Bones and Flesh and Blood. 1971.
- Songs from an Afro/phone. 1972.
- In a Time of Rain & Desire: New Love Poems. 1973.
- Consider Loneliness as These Things. 1974.
- The Eye in the Ceiling: Selected Poems. Harlem River Press. 1991. ISBN 978-0-86316-307-4.
- Drumvoices: The Mission of Afro-American Poetry, A Critical History. Anchor Press. 1976. ISBN 978-0-385-06168-1.

=== Contributions to anthologies ===
- Keith Gilyard, ed. (1997). "Milestone: The Birth of an Ancestor". Spirit & Flame: An Anthology of Contemporary African American Poetry. Syracuse University Press. ISBN 978-0-8156-2731-9.
- Gerald Lyn Early, ed. (1998). "Carryover". Ain't But a Place: An Anthology of African American Writings About St. Louis. Missouri History Museum. ISBN 978-1-883982-28-7.
- Lee Ann Sandweiss, ed. (2000). "Honoring the Female Olympian of the Century; Wedge Wall, Huge Hand". Seeking St. Louis: Voices from a River City, 1670–2000. Missouri History Museum. ISBN 978-1-883982-11-9.
- Ishmael Reed, ed. (2003). "Love is Not a Word". From Totems to Hip-Hop. Thunder's Mouth Press. p. 84. ISBN 978-1-56025-458-4. "Eugene B. Redmond."
- Arnold Rampersad; Hilary Herbold, eds. (2006). "Epigrams For My Father". The Oxford Anthology of African-American Poetry. Oxford University Press. ISBN 978-0-19-512563-4.
- Marie Harris, Kathleen Aguero, eds (1989), "Epigrams for My Father", An Ear to the Ground, University of Georgia Press. ISBN 0-8203-1123-5
- John H. Bracey Jr., Sonia Sanchez, and James Smethurst, eds (2014). "DA-DUM-DUN: A BAM Triumvirate of Conch/Us/Nest: Miles Davis, Henry Dumas & Katherine Dunham in East St. Louis, Illinois (Reminiscence)". SOS-Calling All Black People: A Black Arts Movement Reader. University of Massachusetts Press. ISBN 978-1-62534-031-3.
