= Mapooram =

1960 poem by Roland Robinson

- by Roland Robinson
- First published in: The Bulletin
- Country: Australia
- Language: English
- Publication date: 17 February 1960
- Lines: 27

"Mapooram" is a 1960 poem by Australian poet Roland Robinson.

It was first published in The Bulletin on 17 February 1960, and later in the poet's collections and other Australian poetry anthologies. The poem carries an explanatory line that reads: "(Related by Fred Biggs, Ngeamba tribe, Lake Carjellingo)."

== Critical reception ==
In his commentary on the poem in 60 Classic Australian Poems Geoff Page noted "Doctrinaire readers, on both sides of the racial divide, might see Robinson's 're-write' of Biggs' story as an 'appropriation', as yet another European rip-off. This was certainly a risk Robinson took, and was aware of, but ultimately the poem is its own justification...Fortunately, the poem turns out to be great story, subtly retold by Robinson in a style entirely appropriate to the purpose, a language that is at once his own and, in a different way, Fred Biggs' too."

== Further publications ==
After the poem's initial publication in The Bulletin it was reprinted as follows:

- Altjeringa and Other Aboriginal Poems by Roland Robinson, Reed, 1970
- Aboriginal Myths and Legends by Roland Robinson and T. G. H. Strehlow, Sun Books, 1977
- The Jindyworobaks edited by Brian Elliott, University of Queensland Press, 1979
- My Country: Australian Poetry and Short Stories, Two Hundred Years edited by Leonie Kramer, Lansdowne, 1985
- The New Oxford Book of Australian Verse edited by Les Murray, Oxford University Press, 1986
- Anthology of Australian Religious Poetry edited by Les Murray, Collins Dove, 1986
- Selected Poems by Roland Robinson, Angus and Robertson, 1989
- The Nearest the White Man Gets: Aboriginal Narratives and Poems of New South Wales by Roland Robinson, Hale and Iremonger, 1989
- Australian Poetry in the Twentieth Century edited by Robert Gray and Geoffrey Lehmann, Heinemann, 1991
- Fivefathers: Five Australian Poets of the Pre-Academic Era edited by Les Murray, Carcanet, 1994
- Australian Verse: An Oxford Anthology edited by John Leonard, Oxford University Press, 1998
- 80 Great Poems from Chaucer to Now edited by Geoff Page, University of NSW Press, 2006
- 60 Classic Australian Poems edited by Geoff Page, University of NSW Press, 2009
- The Puncher & Wattmann Anthology of Australian Poetry edited by John Leonard, Puncher & Wattmann, 2009
- Would I Might Find My Country and Other Poems by Roland Robinson, Picaro Press, 2010
- Australian Poetry Since 1788 edited by Geoffrey Lehmann and Robert Gray, University of NSW Press, 2011

== See also ==
- 1960 in poetry
- 1960 in literature
- 1960 in Australian literature
