= Drifters (poem) =

1968 poem by Australian poet Bruce Dawe

- by Bruce Dawe
- First published in: Australian Letters, vol. 8 no. 1, January 1968
- Country: Australia
- Language: English
- Publication date: January 1968
- Lines: 13

"Drifters" (1968) is a poem by Australian poet Bruce Dawe.

It was originally published in the literary journal Australian Letters vol. 8 no. 1, in January 1968, and was subsequently reprinted in the author's single-author collections and a number of Australian poetry anthologies.

== Synopsis ==
A father will one day tell his wife and family to start packing, to put everything they own from their rental home into their "ute", leaving everything they loved, or hated, behind as they move on to their new location.

== Critical reception ==
Noel Rowe, writing about the structure of the poem in his essay "Much More You Could Say: Bruce Dawe's poetry" for Sydney Studies in English noted that it is "important that the last word of 'Drifters is 'wish' since so much of the poem is concerned with the effects of decision-making and with oppressive and repressive acts of will."

In his commentary on the poem in 60 Classic Australian Poems Geoff Page called it a "classic". He went on to explain that "It's not a triumph of metrical arrangement or a stunning succession of images. It's not about some major figure in our political landscape or a moment of blazing spiritual insight. It is, however, a masterpiece of tone and understatement – and a striking example of what free verse can do at its most subtle."

== Publication history ==
After the poem's initial publication in Australian Letters in 1968 it was reprinted as follows:

- An Eye for a Tooth : Poems by Bruce Dawe, Cheshire, 1968
- Condolences of the Season : Selected Poems by Bruce Dawe, Longman Cheshire, 1971
- Twelve Poets, 1950-1970 edited by Alexander Craig, Jacaranda Press, 1971
- The Land's Meaning edited by L. M. Hannan and B. A. Breen, Macmillan, 1973
- What's Yours? : An Anthology of Australian Poetry edited by Alvie Egan, Victorian Foundation on Alcoholism & Drug Dependence, 1977
- Sometimes Gladness : Collected Poems 1954-1978 by Bruce Dawe, Longman Cheshire, 1978
- The Golden Apples of the Sun : Twentieth Century Australian Poetry edited by Chris Wallace-Crabbe, Melbourne University Press, 1980
- The Sydney Morning Herald, 22 November 1980
- The Collins Book of Australian Poetry edited by Rodney Hall, Collins, 1981
- My Country : Australian Poetry and Short Stories, Two Hundred Years edited by Leonie Kramer, Lansdowne, 1985
- Cross-Country : A Book of Australian Verse edited by John Barnes and Brian MacFarlane, Heinemann, 1988
- Australian Poetry in the Twentieth Century edited by Robert Gray and Geoffrey Lehmann, Heinemann, 1991
- The Faber Book of Modern Australian Verse edited by Vincent Buckley, Faber, 1991
- The Penguin Book of Modern Australian Poetry edited by John Tranter and Philip Mead, Penguin, 1991
- 50 Years of Queensland Poetry : 1940s to 1990s edited by Philip Neilsen and Helen Horton, Central Queensland University Press, 1998
- Australian Verse : An Oxford Anthology edited by John Leonard, Oxford University Press, 1998
- Family Ties : Australian Poems of the Family edited by Jennifer Strauss, Oxford University Press, 1998
- 80 Great Poems from Chaucer to Now edited by Geoff Page, University of NSW Press, 2006
- Two Centuries of Australian Poetry edited by Kathrine Bell, Gary Allen, 2007
- 60 Classic Australian Poems edited by Geoff Page, University of NSW Press, 2009
- Bruce Dawe : Life Cycle by Stephany Steggall, Ginninderra Press, 2009
- The Puncher & Wattmann Anthology of Australian Poetry edited by John Leonard, Puncher & Wattmann, 2009
- Australian Poetry Since 1788 edited by Geoffrey Lehmann and Robert Gray, University of NSW Press, 2011
- Love is Strong as Death edited by Paul Kelly, Hamish Hamilton, 2019

== See also ==
- 1968 in Australian literature
- 1968 in poetry

== Notes ==
- You can read the full text of the poem in The Sydney Morning Herald, 22 November 1980, p20.
