= In-Flight Note =

1985 poem by Australian poet Judith Rodriguez

- by Judith Rodriguez
- Written: 1985
- First published in: The Age, 9 February 1985
- Country: Australia
- Language: English
- Lines: 14

"In-Flight Note" (1985) is a sonnet by Australian writer Judith Rodriguez. It was originally published in The Age newspaper on 9 February 1985, and later included in the author's poetry collections and a number of Australian poetry anthologies.

== Synopsis ==
The poet, or poem's narrator, is sitting next to a "mousy" boy on a flight. He appears to be writing a note to his "Kitten" and the poet is reading that note and speculating on the implied relationship, even on the identity of "Kitten".

== Critical reception ==
In his commentary on the poem in 60 Classic Australian Poems Geoff Page noted that "poetry does not always have to be about spiritual uplift. There are many other rewards, some of them more than a little unworthy perhaps."

== Publishing history ==
After its initial publication in The Age newspaper in 1985 the poem was reprinted as follows:

- The House by Water : New and Selected Poems by Judith Rodriguez, University of Queensland Press, 1988
- Contemporary Australian Poetry: An Anthology edited by John Leonard, Houghton Mifflin, 1990
- The Penguin Book of Modern Australian Poetry edited by John Tranter and Philip Mead, Penguin, 1991
- The Sting in the Wattle : Australian Satirical Verse edited by Philip Neilsen, University of Queensland Press, 1993
- The Oxford Book of Australian Love Poems edited by Jennifer Strauss, Oxford University Press, 1993
- 50 Years of Queensland Poetry : 1940s to 1990s edited by Philip Neilsen and Helen Horton, Central Queensland University Press, 1998
- Australian Verse : An Oxford Anthology edited by John Leonard, Oxford University Press, 1998
- The Indigo Book of Modern Australian Sonnets edited by Geoff Page, Indigo, 2003
- Manatee and Other Poems by Judith Rodriguez, Picaro Press, 2007
- 60 Classic Australian Poems edited by Geoff Page, University of NSW Press, 2009
- The Puncher & Wattmann Anthology of Australian Poetry edited by John Leonard, Puncher & Wattmann, 2009
- Australian Poetry Since 1788 edited by Geoffrey Lehmann and Robert Gray, University of NSW Press, 2011

== See also ==
- 1985 in Australian literature
- 1985 in poetry

== Notes ==
The full text of the poem is available on the Australian Poetry Library archived website.
