= The Mayan Books =

Poem by A. D. Hope

- by A. D. Hope
- First published in: Orpheus by A. D. Hope (1991)
- Country: Australia
- Language: English
- Publication date: 1991

"The Mayan Books" is a poem by Australian poet A. D. Hope. It was first published in the poet's collection Orpheus in 1991, and later in other Australian poetry anthologies.

== Outline ==
The poem recounts the sin of Archbishop Diego de Landa of Yucatán who gathered together a large pile of Mayan books and burned the lot. In heaven he looks toward God but God never looks at him.

== Analysis ==
In his commentary on the poem in 60 Classic Australian Poems Geoff Page noted that poems like this "have a way of floating into and out of focus, according to how much we seem to need them.".

== Further publications ==
- Selected Poems by A. D. Hope, edited by David Brooks, Angus and Robertson, 1992
- The Oxford Book of Modern Australian Verse edited by Peter Porter, Oxford University Press, 1996
- Australian Verse : An Oxford Anthology edited by John Leonard, Oxford University Press, 1998
- 60 Classic Australian Poems edited by Geoff Page, University of NSW Press, 2009
- Macquarie PEN Anthology of Australian Literature edited by Nicholas Jose, Kerryn Goldsworthy, Anita Heiss, David McCooey, Peter Minter, Nicole Moore, and Elizabeth Webby, Allen and Unwin, 2009
- The Puncher & Wattmann Anthology of Australian Poetry edited by John Leonard, Puncher & Wattmann, 2009
- Australian Poetry Since 1788 edited by Geoffrey Lehmann and Robert Gray, University of NSW Press, 2011

== Note ==
- Geoff Page, in 60 Classic Australian Poems, indicates that the poem was originally written some time in the 1970s.

== See also ==
- 1991 in poetry
- 1991 in literature
- 1991 in Australian literature
- Australian literature
