= Thelma Forshaw =

Australian writer and journalist

- Born: Thelma Honora Forshaw; 1 August 1923; Glebe Point, New South Wales, Australia
- Died: 8 October 1995 (aged 72); Sydney, New South Wales, Australia
- Other names: Thelma Körting
- Occupation(s): Writer, journalist
- Known for: An Affair of Clowns (1967)

Thelma Honora Forshaw or Thelma Korting (1 August 1923 – 8 October 1995) was an Australian short story writer and journalist. In 1967 she published a largely autobiographical collection of short stories, An Affair of Clowns, in 1967. As a journalist she worked as a freelancer and book reviewer for The Sydney Morning Herald, The Age, The Australian, The Bulletin (since defunct), Meanjin, Nation, and Quadrant.

== Biography ==
Thelma Honora Forshaw was born on 1 August 1923 at Glebe Point – a suburb of Sydney. Her father, Leslie Alfred Forshaw (1901–1935), was a labourer and part-time boxer, her mother was Mary Winifred Forshaw (née Burke, 1889–1949), and her two younger brothers Walter and Leslie junior. From August 1935 after her father's death, the family lived with relatives in Annandale. Forshaw was educated at St Michael's Catholic Primary School in Stanmore and St Fiacre's Primary School in Leichardt. At the age of 14 years she wrote a poem, "Idyll of a Summer Noon", which was published in The Sydney Morning Herald in February 1938. Forshaw undertook tertiary studies at Sydney Teachers' College.

During World War II, Forshaw enlisted on 15 April 1942 in the WAAAF and was honourably discharged as an Aircraftwoman on 1 March 1943. She worked as a secretary and an advertising writer before marrying George Korting, an Austrian refugee, in 1948. In January 1951, using her married name, Thelma Korting, she wrote "This Veil Wore Me!" in The Argus. Subsequently, she worked as a freelancer and book reviewer for The Sydney Morning Herald, The Age, The Australian, The Bulletin, Meanjin, Nation, Quadrant and other publications.

Her short stories appeared in a number of journals and anthologies. In 1967, a collection of them, An Affair of Clowns, was published by Angus & Robertson. Stephen Torre, in The Cambridge History of Australian Literature (2009), described the book's first section, "Some Customs of My Clan" as "stories about a working-class Irish Catholic family narrated by a daughter, an aspiring writer. The manners of the Sydney 'clan' include hard drinking, gambling, ferocious gossiping and scandal-mongering, fighting and loving." These stories were notable for their realistic characters set within gritty, penetrating and humorous depictions of Australian city life in the first half of the 20th century, with a focus on outsiders, working-class lifestyles and the migrant experience.

In January 1972 Forshaw wrote a review of Germaine Greer's book, The Female Eunuch (1970) for The Age which "has stirred up a considerable controversy". According to Keith Dunstan in The Best Australian Profiles (2004), this review was "[t]he most famous.... [Forshaw] described [The Female Eunuch] as 'the orchestrated over-the-back-fence grizzle... based on the curious fancy... we were all men, and then some fiend castrated half of us.'" Forshaw compared herself to Greer: "I'm not a middle-class lady defending her domain. My parents were working class.... I'm a housewife because I want to, I write because I want to, I love my husband who is a male, chauvinist pig and I love my two children."

Thelma Forshaw died on 8 October 1995 of a stroke in her sleep, aged 72, and was survived by her husband George and their children Helene and Grea.

== Bibliography ==
Short story collection

- Forshaw, Thelma (1967). An Affair of Clowns : Short Stories and Sketches. Sydney: Angus & Robertson.

Selected anthologised short stories

Thelma Forshaw's short stories have appeared in numerous publications and have been widely anthologised.

- "Love-Life of a Boozer", Modern Australian Humour, Bill Wannan (ed), Lansdowne Press Pty Ltd, 1962
- "Better than Australia, No?", Two Ways Meet: Stories of Migrants in Australia, Louise Elizabeth Rorabacher (ed), FW Cheshire, 1963
- "The Widow", "The One That Got Away", Australian Pavements: An Urban Anthology, Bill Wannan (ed), Lansdowne Press Pty Ltd, 1964
- "Love-Life of a Boozer", An Overland Muster: Selections from Overland, 1954–1964, Stephen Murray-Smith (ed), Jacaranda Press, 1965
- Forshaw, Thelma (1967). "The Wowser". Short Stories of Australia: The Moderns. Compiled, introduction by Beatrice Davis. Sydney, NSW: Angus & Robertson.
- "The Widow", Australian Writing Today, Charles Higham (ed), Penguin Books, 1968
- "Love-Life of a Boozer", The Pick of Modern Australian Humour: A sparkling collection from the work of Australia's foremost humorists, Bill Wannan (ed), Lansdowne Press Pty Ltd, 1968
- "The Mateship Syndrome", Modern Australian Short Stories, Mary Lord (ed), Edward Arnold, 1971
- Forshaw, Thelma (1972). "The Widow". In Hal Porter (ed.). It Could Be You. Adelaide, SA: Rigby. ISBN 0-851-79406-8.
- "The Wowser", Best Australian Short Stories, Douglas Stewart and Beatrice Davis (ed), Lloyd O'Neil, 1973
- "The Ace (Mateship Syndrome) ", Stories from Down Under, AG Ayre (ed), Longman, 1976
- "The Demo", The Penguin Book of Australian Short Stories, Harry Heseltine (ed), Penguin Books, 1976
- "The Lampoonist", The White Chrysanthemum: Changing Images of Australian Motherhood, Nancy Keesing (ed), Angus & Robertson, 1977
- "On Our Safari", Australian Short Stories, Kerryn Goldsworthy (ed), JM Dent Pty Ltd, 1983
- "A tuntetes (The Demo) ", Vilagirodalmi Folyoirat (World Literary Magazine) 1985/8, Kardos Laszlo (ed), World, 1985
- "The Demo", Impressions of Australia, Eva Laegdsgaard, Inger Marie Dahl (ed), Systime, 1986
- Forshaw, Thelma (1992). "The Mateship Syndrome". In Lawerence Thomas Hergenhan (ed.). The Australian Short Story : A Collection 1890s to 1990s (2nd ed.). St Lucia, Queensland: University of Queensland Press. ISBN 978-0-7022-2348-8.
- "Better than Australia, No?", Living Here: Short Stories from Australasia 1938–1988, Edmund Campion (ed), Allen & Unwin, 1988
- "The Demo", Ourselves Among Others: Cross Cultural Readings for Writers, Carl J Verberg (ed), Bedford Books, 1988
- "The Procurer", Feeling Restless: Australian Women's Short Stories 1940–1969, Connie Burns and Marygai McNamara (ed), Imprint, 1989
- "The Grand Passion", Goodbye to Romance: Stories by New Zealand and Australian Women Writers, Elizabeth Webby and Lydia Wevers (ed), Allen & Unwin, 1989
- "Underdogging", Stop Me if You've Heard It: Anthology of Humorous Short Stories, Jane Arms (ed), ABC Enterprises, 1989
- "The Mateship Syndrome", Under Southern Skies, Eva Laegdsgaard and Inger Marie Dahl (ed), Systime, 1989
- "The Widow", The Oxford Book of Australian Short Stories, Michael Wilding (ed), Oxford University Press, 1994
