= Henry Dumas =

American writer (1934–1968)

- Born: Henry Lee Dumas; July 20, 1934; Sweet Home, Arkansas, United States
- Died: May 23, 1968 (aged 33); New York City, United States
- Occupations: Poet; short fiction writer; teacher
- Spouse: Loretta Ponton
- Children: 2
- Writing career
- Movement: Black Aesthetic

Henry Dumas (July 20, 1934 – May 23, 1968) was an American writer and poet. He was called "an absolute genius" by Toni Morrison, who as a commissioning editor at Random House published posthumous collections of his poetry (Play Ebony, Play Ivory) and of his short stories (Ark of Bones), in 1974.

== Biography ==
Dumas was born in Sweet Home, Arkansas, in 1934 and lived there until the age of ten, when he moved to New York City. In Harlem, he attended public school and graduated from Commerce High School in 1953. After graduating, he attended City College of New York before joining the Air Force, where he was primarily stationed at Lackland Air Force Base in San Antonio, Texas. Prior to joining the military, he had met a woman named Loretta Ponton in New York. The two kept in touch, marrying in 1955. Dumas also spent a year in the Arabian Peninsula, where he developed an interest in Arab culture. He was in the military until 1957, at which time he enrolled at Rutgers University, where he attended both as a part-time student without attaining a degree. Dumas and Ponton had two sons: David, born in 1958, and Michael, born in 1962.

In 1967, some of Dumas' early work was published in the Hiram Poetry Review, which was edited by Edward W. Crosby. Crosby invited him to Southern Illinois University's Experiment in Higher Education in East St. Louis, where Dumas was a teacher, counselor, and director of language workshops. Dumas also became an editor of the Hiram Review from 1967 until his death in 1968. After Dumas's untimely death, Crosby returned to the editorial staff of the Hiram Review and urged poet Eugene B. Redmond, one of Dumas's fellow teachers, to talk to Loretta Dumas about publishing his works posthumously. With the editorial assistance of Hale Chatfield, founder of the Hiram Poetry Review, Dumas's works were published by Southern Illinois University Press.

=== Death ===
On May 23, 1968, at approximately 12:15 a.m., Dumas was shot to death at the age of 33 by a New York City Transit Police officer on the southbound platform of the 125th Street station of the New York City Subway. According to the Associated Press report, the officer claimed that Dumas had been threatening another man with a knife. The officer said that he ordered Dumas to drop the knife, but that Dumas instead turned, attacked the officer, and slashed the officer's cheek. The officer stated that he fired three times.

The circumstances of the shooting remain unclear, as no witnesses testified and no records remain since the Transit Police Department's records of the shooting were destroyed when the agency merged into the New York City Police Department in 1995. Dumas's death is often called "a case of mistaken identity".

Dumas was buried in Long Island National Cemetery in Suffolk County, New York, on May 29, 1968. His death is mentioned in the poem "An Alphabet of My Dead" by Robert Pinsky, the poem "Night, for Henry Dumas" by Aracelis Girmay, and the poem "For Henry Dumas" by Stanley Cooperman.

== Posthumous recognition ==
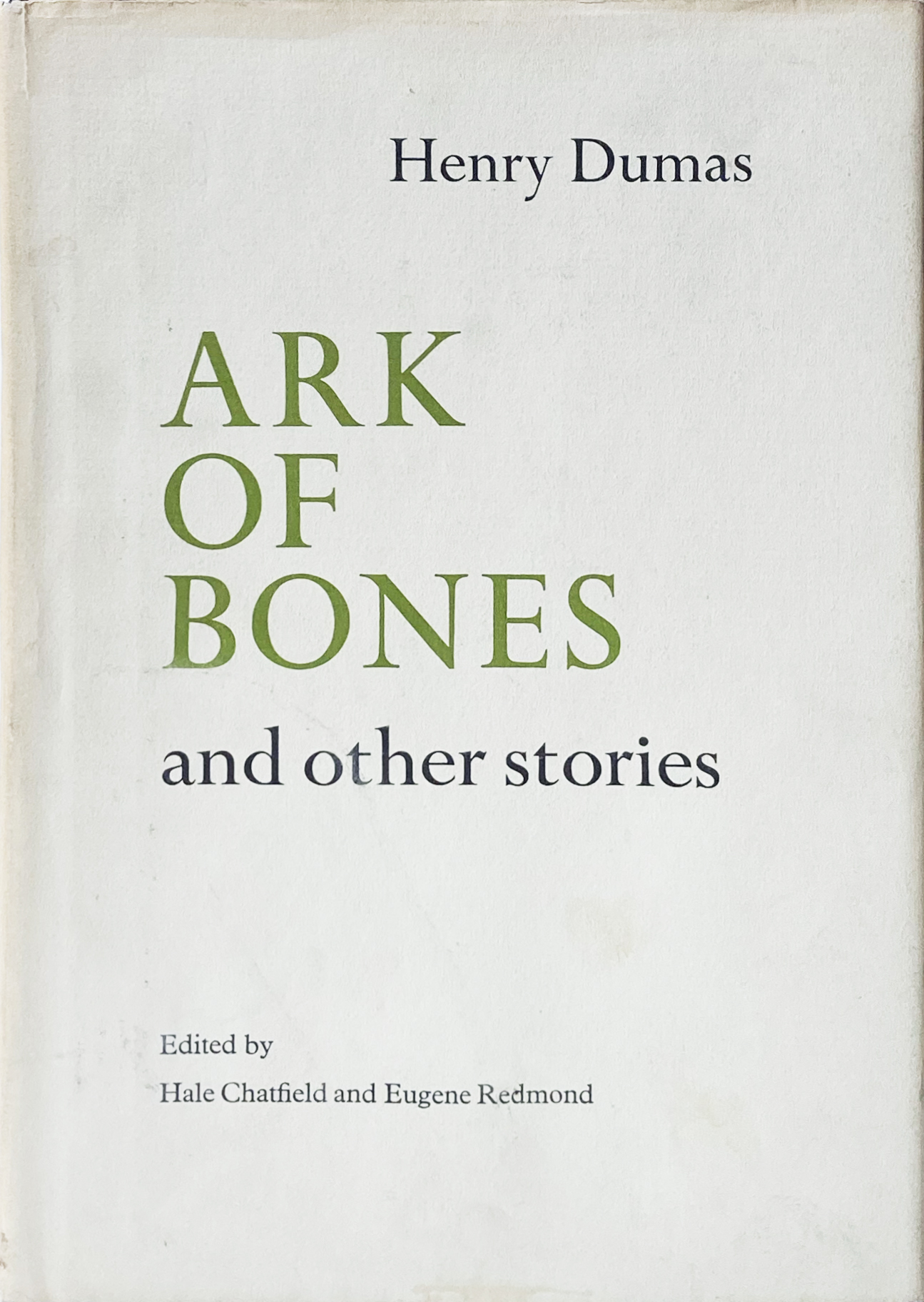
Front cover of the first edition of Ark of Bones (Southern Illinois University Press, 1970)

A limited amount of Dumas's work was published during his lifetime in several small magazines and journals in the 1960s. It is mainly through the efforts of Eugene B. Redmond, the executor of Dumas's literary estate, that various collections of his work have been published. Ark of Bones and Other Stories and Poetry for My People were both first published in 1970 by Southern Illinois University Press, where Dumas worked before his death. Toni Morrison, then working as an editor at Random House, read Poetry for My People and used her influence to have Random House publish two collections of Dumas's published and unpublished writings in 1974: Play Ebony, Play Ivory (a re-edition of Poetry for my People) and Ark of Bones. To generate interest in Dumas, Morrison hosted a book launch party on October 13, 1974. In her invitation, Morrison said of Dumas's work that it was "some of the most beautiful, moving, and profound poetry and fiction that I have ever in my life read." When Play Ebony, Play Ivory was released in 1974, Julius Lester, writing in The New York Times Book Review, called Dumas "the most original Afro-American poet of the sixties."

In 1976, Dumas's short story "Thalia" won The Black Scholar's first creative writing award, chosen by James Baldwin. Redmond helped renew interest in Dumas in 1988 with the publication of the short story collection Goodbye Sweetwater, which contained both previously published and new works. Redmond released a second collection, Knees of a Natural Man, in 1989. In 2015, Redmond spoke of his hope that "the Black Lives Matter movement will help introduce Dumas to a whole new audience and help bolster the foundation that the moment rests upon."

Rapper R.A.P. Ferreira has referenced Dumas in songs multiple times, most notably in the song "Napping Under the Echo Tree", whose title is a reference to the book Echo Tree: The Collected Short Fiction of Henry Dumas. Dumas is also referenced by name in the song's lyrics.

== Influences ==
Dumas described himself as having been heavily influenced by Moms Mabley and gospel music at a young age. Dumas used his spiritual upbringing as well as his other experiences as a Black child growing up in the American South during the 1930s and 1940s frequently in his writings. In his poem "Afro American", he attempts to define not only what it means to be Black, but also of dual heritage and proposes the recognition of both a dual heritage and that of each of its creators.

Dumas had a strong interest in Black folk music, particularly gospel, spirituals, jazz, and blues. In the 1960s, he became recognized as one of the most important voices of the Black power movement and the Black Arts Movement. Dumas studied with jazz musician Sun Ra during the mid-1960s. Dumas's poem "Black Paladins" became the title track for a recording by Joseph Jarman and Famoudou Don Moye in 1979.

Writer Margaret Walker and musicians James Brown and John Coltrane were major influences on his writing. Elements of Black Christianity, Islam, Sufism, Hinduism, Buddhism, Native American mythology, and African mythology appear in Dumas's works.

== Bibliography ==
=== Poetry ===
- Poetry for My People (Southern Illinois University Press, 1970)
- Play Ebony, Play Ivory (Random House, 1974)
- Knees of a Natural Man: The Selected Poetry of Henry Dumas (Thunder's Mouth Press, 1989)

=== Short story collections ===
- Ark of Bones and Other Stories (Southern Illinois University Press, 1970)
- Rope of Wind and Other Stories (Random House, 1979)
- Goodbye, Sweetwater: New and Selected Stories (Thunder's Mouth Press, 1988)
- Echo Tree: The Collected Short Fiction of Henry Dumas (Coffee House Press, 2003)

=== Novels ===
- Jonoah and the Green Stone (Random House, 1976)
