= Hiram Poetry Review =

American literary magazine

The Hiram Poetry Review is an American literary magazine founded in 1966 by Hiram College English professor Hale Chatfield. It is published annually. The journal publishes original poetry, poetry reviews and interviews with established poets. Work that has been published in the Hiram Poetry Review has been reprinted in the Pushcart Prize Anthology. The journal played an important role in establishing the career of Charles Bukowski, whose work appeared frequently in the journal between 1966 and 1969. The Review and its editor in chief, Hale Chatfield, were also instrumental in the posthumous publication of the works of Henry Dumas, one of Chatfield's fellow students at Rutgers.

== Notable contributors ==
- Jacob M. Appel
- Russell Banks
- Charles Bukowski
- Lyn Coffin
- Henry Dumas
- Norman Hoegberg
- Christina Kallery
- Robert Lax
- Virgil Suarez
- Don Winter

== See also ==
- List of literary magazines
