= The Witnesses (poem) =

1968 poem by Australian poet Dorothy Hewett

- by Dorothy Hewett
- Written: 1968
- First published in: Meanjin Quarterly vol. 27 no. 4 Summer 1968
- Country: Australia
- Language: English
- Series: Ah Those Dead Ladies

"The Witnesses" (1968) is a poem by Australian poet Dorothy Hewett.

It was originally published in the journal Meanjin Quarterly vol. 27 no. 4 Summer 1968, and was subsequently reprinted in the author's single-author collections and a number of Australian poetry anthologies.

The poem forms a part of the poet's Ah Those Dead Ladies sequence, which was all brought together in her collection Rapunzel in Suburbia in 1975.

== Synopsis ==
A hawk soars in the clear sky searching for mice and plovers. While the hawk witnesses the world from up high, a young girl has been gang-raped by a number of boys in a haystack, "And the hawk in high sky hung."

== Critical reception ==
While reviewing Wheatlands, the collection of poems Hewett published in collaboration with John Kinsella in 2000, Christopher Bantick noted that the works in the collection "shift from the lyricism of rurally inspired poetry to introspective self-examination born of landscape." He quoted from this poem to illustrate this point.

At the time of the poet's death in 2002 Fay Zwicky wrote a tribute to her in which she stated: "Like your beloved Blake, you found your world in a grain of sand, the sandy soil and windswept dry soaks of the Western Australian wheat belt", listing this poem as an example.

In his commentary on the poem in 60 Classic Australian Poems Geoff Page noted "The adventurous rhetoric and the poem's insistent rhymes tend to remind us of Dylan Thomas." Page concluded that "it is in a poem like 'The Witnesses' that we come closest to the essense of [Hewett's] worldview."

== Publication history ==
After the poem's initial publication Meanjin Quarterly in 1968 it was reprinted as follows:

- Australian Poetry 1968 edited by Dorothy Auchterlonie, Angus and Robertson, 1968
- Rapunzel in Suburbia by Dorothy Hewett, Prism, 1975
- Wide Domain : Western Australian Themes and Images edited by Bruce Bennett and William Grono, Angus and Robertson, 1979
- A Tremendous World in Her Head : Selected Poems by Dorothy Hewett, Dangaroo Press, 1989
- Collected Poems : 1940-1995 by Dorothy Hewett, Fremantle Press, 1995
- The Oxford Book of Modern Australian Verse edited by Peter Porter, Oxford University Press, 1996
- Wheatlands by Dorothy Hewett and John Kinsella, Fremantle Press, 2000
- Sunlines : An Anthology of Poetry to Celebrate Australia's Harmony in Diversity edited by Anne Fairbairn, Dept of Immigration and Multicultural and Indigenous Affairs, 2002
- 60 Classic Australian Poems edited by Geoff Page, University of NSW Press, 2009

== Notes ==
- You can read the full text of the poem via the Informit website, or on the Poetry Library archived website.
- Along with his commentary on the poem Geoff Page notes that the poet's collection, Rapunzel in Suburbia, where the poem would first have become readily available, was "banned from distribution in Western Australia for several years".

== See also ==
- 1968 in Australian literature
- 1968 in poetry
