= Edward W. Crosby =

American academic administrator (1932–2021)

Dr. Edward W. Crosby
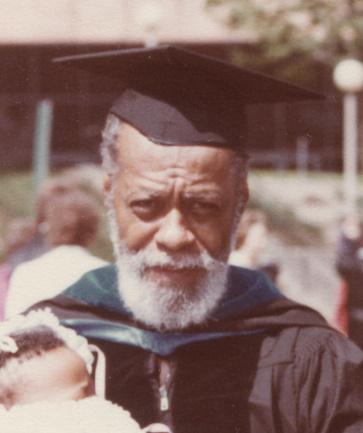
- Dr. Crosby attends a Kent State graduation ceremony in the mid-1980s.
- Born: November 4, 1932; Cleveland, Ohio
- Died: February 10, 2021 (aged 88); Kent, Ohio
- Occupations: Administrator professor Philosopher; Author; Scholar
- Spouse: Shirley G. Crosby (m. 1956)
- Website: blakfacts.org

Edward Warren Crosby (November 4, 1932 – February 10, 2021) was an African-American professor/administrator emeritus, in the Department of Pan-African Studies at Kent State University (KSU). As a pioneer in the field of Black education his most notable accomplishments include the establishment of Black History Month and the Department of Pan-African Studies at KSU. The Institute for African American Affairs (1969) and the Center of Pan-African Culture (1970) were two of the first institutions of their kind to be established at institutions of higher education.

== Background and education ==
Born and raised in Cleveland, Ohio, Crosby was the fourth child born to Frederick Douglass and Marion G. Crosby. He attended Cleveland's Our Lady of the Blessed Sacrament parochial and St. Edward's Catholic high schools.

Initially a straight "A" student and an aspiring priest, Crosby's transfer from St. Edward's to Cleveland's public schools paralleled a decline in his academic performance as well as his increased truancy from school and an involvement in a number of delinquent activities. He served in the United States military and was stationed in England. Nevertheless, Crosby would go on to earn a BA in Spanish in 1957 and an MA in German in 1959, both from Kent State University; and a PhD in medieval German languages and literature and medieval history from the University of Kansas in 1965. In 1957 he began teaching at Kent State and subsequently held teaching positions at a number of other institutions, including Hiram College, Tuskegee Institute, Southern Illinois University and the University of Washington.

== Career ==
Crosby founded and served as the director of the Institute for African American Affairs (IAAA) from 1969 to 1976. In 1976 the institute successfully petitioned Kent State for departmental status, which gave birth to the Department of Pan-African Studies (DPAS); thus Dr. Crosby served for 18 years as the department's first chair. The IAAA still exists as a community development and research institute at Kent State.

The IAAA used a holistic curriculum model based on Crosby's earlier work at Southern Illinois University, Edwardsville (SIUE). The curriculum he developed for the IAAA's Experiment in Higher Education program was similar to another upstart program at the time, Upward Bound. Both focused on post-secondary readiness for students from urban areas with low high school graduation rates, with the EHE tailored for specialized aptitude testing in and instruction of comparably lower-performing students. EHE teachers received training as counselors and employed an "Each One Teach One" methodology wherein students largely instructed each other. The EHE curriculum also actively sought to validate the culture of its students, using examples, situations and language familiar to students to teach subject matter they would encounter at any university.

== Notable accomplishments ==
=== Creation of the East St. Louis Black Studies Model ===
His work in the realm of Black education really began in East St. Louis, Illinois, even though he had previously spent a little more than a year at Tuskegee Institute, Alabama, and a brief stint working with the Community Action Council in Akron, Ohio. As the director of education for the Experiment in Higher Education (EHE) Dr. Crosby and his team of fellow Kent State alumni developed a unique curriculum that taught their students what they needed for college without denying the culture of their respective communities. The program developed in East St. Louis under the direction of Crosby, Hyman Frankel and Don Henderson has been cited as the first African-centered collegiate curriculum in the U.S. Black studies programs, departments and institutes were developed at the behest of Black communities across the nation. East St. Louis, with its Black community of 70,000 was no exception. EHE's influence on the development of Black studies in universities across the nation was due in part to the amount of resources, time and brain power they had at hand to forge a pedagogy that put the student at the center of their learning. This Black studies consortium did not confine their efforts to East St. Louis, they offered consulting services to universities from California to New York.

One of the lessons of East St. Louis was the importance of an interdisciplinary, holistic approach to Black education. In East St. Louis EHE was partnered with Katherine Dunham’s Performing Arts Training Center (PATC). The symbiotic relationship between EHE and PATC attracted educators, as well as cultural icons from all over the U.S. and beyond to East St. Louis, which generated a lot of energy in the community and attracted community members from all walks of life. On arriving at Kent, knowing the value of this kind of symbiosis, Crosby took on the task of developing an academic program modeled after the one he had previously spearheaded in East St. Louis and also took on the task of creating a cultural center that could work in tandem with the newly formed Institute for African American Affairs (IAAA). For 23 years this dual institution functioned with one purpose in mind, which was to provide an environment that reaffirmed the value of African-American culture while helping their students learn to use the academic skills necessary to graduate from a four-year institution in the study and promulgation of this culture. The implementation of this kind of Black pedagogy has led to the successful graduation of hundreds, if not thousands, of students, that wouldn't have made it otherwise, many of which have devoted their careers to working in Black communities all over the U.S. The Human Relations Center, which was founded in 1968, attempted to do this kind of work, however their perspective was that the students needed to assimilate. The Institute validated the students and their culture as worthy of emulation. The difference between the two could not be more clear cut.

=== Black History Month pioneer ===
Soon after arriving at Kent State he became one of the key organizers of the first celebration of Black History Month in the U.S., which occurred in February 1970. It was six years later, during the U.S. bicentennial, that the expansion of Negro History Week, as it had been called, was recognized nationally when then President Gerald R. Ford delivered to the nation regarding the observance of Black History Month.

Since that time regular observances of Black History Month have become common in elementary, secondary and high schools, as well as city, state and federal buildings across the country. In fact, the practice has spread to many countries overseas, particularly in Europe.

Significantly, the first celebration was a Pan-African affair that included the participation of cultural icons such as Babatunde Olatunji and Pulitzer Prize-winning poet Gwendolyn Brooks, as well as poets Eugene Redmond and Quincy Troupe. Dr. Donald Henderson, then director of the Experiment in Higher Education, lectured on the Black Aesthetic. That first celebration of Black History Month also included presentations by Jimmy Garrett and Chief Fela Sowande, both of whom were involved in the formation of new institutions that had a decidedly Black aesthetic and international impact. Jimmy Garrett was a key player in the formation of the first Black Student Union and subsequently the first Black studies department in the U.S., while Fela Sowande was a Nigerian philosopher and musician of note who wrote Nigeria's first national anthem. He spent the latter days of his career teaching Black Cosmology in the Department of Pan-African Studies at Kent State University.

== Published books ==
- Your History: A Chronology of Notable Events in the History of Africans in Africa and the Diaspora, 1600 BCE-1980, a revised and enlarged edition with a comprehensive subject and name index, 482 pp., Ginn Press, January 1989. Originally published as a 127-page text by the Institute for African American Affairs, Kent State University, 1976.
- The African Experience in Community Development, with L. Davis and A. Adams Graves, Vol. I, Advocates Publishing Group, 1982. (Both volumes of this text have been re-printed with some minor revisions by Ginn Press), 1988, 1992, 1993.
- The African Experience in Community Development, with L. Davis and A. Adams Graves, Vol. II, Advocates Publishing Group, 1983.

== Published articles ==
- "Black Studies, Kent State University," in Molefi Kete Asante, Ama Mazama (ed.), Encyclopedia of Black Studies, Sage Publications, Inc. (Thousand Oaks, London, New Delhi), 2005, pp. 153–158. [incorrectly cited as Edward R. Crosby]
- "A Million Two Hundred Thousand African Drummers" in Eugene B. Redmond, Sherman Fowler, Marcus Atkins, Drumvoices Revue — VISIBLE GLORY: The Million Man March, Vol. 7, Nos. 1–2, Fall–Winter–Spring, 1997–98, pp. 197–198.
- "Empowering Alternative Schooling Initiatives in the African American Community," in The Electronic Journal of Africana Studies (EJAS1N1 CROSBY), Institute for African American Affairs, Kent State University, April 1995.
- "African Education: An Appraisal of Afrocentric Content vs. Eurocentric Form," Proceedings of the Public Policy Forum — Afrocentrism vs. Eurocentrism: The National Debate, Institute for African American Affairs, May 4, 1991. The Afrocentric Scholar, 1993.
- "Der Europäer ("The European") a fable," by Hermann Hesse in Traumfährte (Zurich, Switzerland: Fretz und Washmuth Verlag A.G., 1945). Translation appears in African American Affairs Monograph Series, Institute for African American Affairs, as an "Occasional Paper," Kent State University, Fall 1992.
- "The 1990s, A Mirror Image of the Illusion of Progress During the '70s and '80s," The Black Collegian, March/April 1991.
- "Henry Dumas as Seer and Educator," Black American Literature Forum, Indiana State University, Summer 1988.
- "The Education of Black Folk: A Historical Perspective," The Western Journal of Black Studies, Vol. 1, No. 2, 1977.
- "Culture, Curriculum And Politics," in African American Affairs Monograph Series, Institute for African American Affairs, Kent State University, Vol. 1, No. 1, November 1973.
- "On Correct Education," Impact, Vol. 7, No. 2, Winter, 1972.
- "The nigger and the Narcissus (or Self-Awareness in Black Education)," prepared for U.S. Information Agency Forum Series (Voice of America), February 15, 1969. Also published in John Szwed (ed.), Black America, Basic Books, Winter, 1970.
- "New Directions in Educating the 'Disadvantaged,'" Higher Education for the Disadvantaged, A Commentary, Southern Illinois University (Edwardsville), 1968, pp. 20–28.
- "The Negro and Education: An Exercise in Absurdity," in Lawrence C. Howard (ed.), Interinstitutional Cooperation in Higher Education, University of Wisconsin, 1967, pp. 358–384.
