= Selected Poems 1942–1968 =

1968 poetry collection by David Campbell

Selected Poems 1942-1968
- Author: David Campbell
- Language: English
- Genre: Poetry collection
- Publisher: Angus and Robertson
- Publication date: 1968
- Publication place: Australia
- Media type: Print
- Pages: 128 pp.
- Awards: 1968 Grace Leven Prize for Poetry winner

Selected Poems 1942–1968 is a collection of poems by Australian poet David Campbell, published by Angus and Robertson in 1968.

The collection contains 110 poems taken from the poet's collections Speak with the Sun (1949), The Miracle of Mullion Hill (1956), Poems (1962) and others. These poems were originally published in a variety of publications. In his acknowledgments the author lists the Australian and Sydney Morning Herald newspapers, and magazines Australian Letters, Meanjin, Overland, Poetry Australia, Southerly, and Texas Quarterly as containing poems from this collection.

== Contents ==
- "Harry Pearce"
- "The Stockman"
- "Winter Stock Route"
- "Spring Hares"
- "The Trapper's Song"
- "Old Tom Dances"
- "The Kidney and the Wren : A Melodrama"
- "Small-Town Gladys"
- ""Race Book, Race Book, Race Book for Randwick!""
- "At the Sheep-Dog Trials"
- "Let Each Ripen"
- "The Possum and the Moon"
- "Conroy's Gap"
- "Soldier's Song"
- "Men in Green"
- "Greek Boy and Girl with Rifles 1947"
- "The Tally"
- "The Forking Tree"
- "Speak with the Sun"
- "The End of Exploring"
- "Windy Gap"
- "Snowgums"
- "Ariel"
- "Dance of Flame and Shadow : Caliban Chorus (Dance of Flame and Shadow : Hobo Chorus)"
- "Beggars"
- "Who Points the Swallow"
- "In Summer's Tree"
- "Night Sowing"
- "The High Plains : 2 : Everlasting Flowers"
- "The Monaro"
- "Words and Lovers"
- "Ephemerons"
- "Song for the Cattle"
- "Donoghue and the Wattle (Donoghoe and the Wattle)"
- "Kelly and the Crow"
- "Jack Spring"
- "Under the Coolabahs"
- "Come Live With Me"
- "The Waiter and the Cuckoo"
- "Dawn Song"
- "Summer Comes With Colour"
- "The Picnic"
- "Here, Under Pear-Trees"
- "As an Old Crow"
- "To the Poetry of Kenneth Slessor"
- "To the Art of Edgar Degas"
- "Mannequin Parade : The Model"
- "Mannequin Parade : Her Gloves"
- "Mannequin Parade : The Sisters"
- "Beach Queen"
- "The House Rises"
- "Hawk and Hill"
- "Summer (The Red Cock)"
- "Prayer for Rain"
- "Against the Sun"
- "To a Ground-Lark"
- "This Wind"
- "On Frosty Days"
- "The Farmer (Winter Hills)"
- "Under the Wattles"
- "Pallid Cuckoo"
- "Bindweed and Yellowtails"
- "The Red Hawk"
- "Song for a Wren"
- "A Letter (Dear Maurice)"
- "Soldier Settlers"
- "When Out of Love"
- "Looking Down on Canberra"
- "The Funeral"
- "Fisherman's Song"
- "A Song and a Dance"
- "Hear the Bird of Day"
- "Sheila's Song"
- "Such Early Hills"
- "Sheila's Washing Song (Song for Odysseus)"
- "Words for Wyatt's Lane"
- "The Beast"
- "We Took the Storms to Bed"
- "On the Birth of a Son"
- "Hearts and Children"
- "Town Planning"
- "Mothers and Daughters"
- "Droving"
- "Six Centuries of Poetry"
- "The Stair"
- "Love's Truth (Windy Nights)"
- "Talking to Strangers"
- "Words With Galatea"
- "Je ne t'ai Jamais Oubliee (after Andre Frenaud)"
- "Antony and Cleopatra"
- "Orpheus in Hell"
- "Mirage"
- "Songs for Different Seasons : I : Clover (after Lope de Vega Carpio)"
- "Bavarian Song (Songs for Different Seasons : II : Songs Through a Window (Bavarian))"
- "Songs for Different Seasons : III : Waiting"
- "Songs for Different Seasons : Words for a Mirror"
- "Songs for Different Seasons : V : Epitaph for Mrs Anne King"
- "Chansons Populaires : I"
- "Chansons Populaires : II"
- "Send No More Friends (after the Early French)"
- "Swann's Song (While I Doubted)"
- "Thoughts after Superville"
- "Reflections of an Artist"
- "Love Song of a Lunarian"
- "Visitors"
- "Dawn (after Rimbaud)"
- "The Boongary"
- "The Miracle of Mullion Hill"
- "The Golden Cow"
- "The Australian Dream"

== Critical reception ==
Writing in the Sydney Morning Herald poet Bruce Beaver said of this collection that Campbell's "lyrical sense has never let him down. The earlier poems indicate and impeccable ear, the later, if anything, an intensification of the singing gift allied with a metphysical cast of mind." He finished his review by calling Campbell a "uniquely lyrical and versatile poet."

== Awards ==
- 1968 Grace Leven Prize for Poetry winner

== See also ==
- 1968 in Australian literature
