= Michael Teig =

American poet and editor

Michael Teig (born 1968) is an American poet and a founding editor of the American literary journal, jubilat.

Born and raised in western Pennsylvania in the City of Franklin, Teig holds a bachelor's degree in English from Oberlin College and a master of fine arts degree in Creative Writing from the University of Massachusetts Amherst.

Teig attended the Kiski School in Saltsburg, Pennsylvania. Founded in 1888, this all-boys boarding school introduced him to arts.

His first book, Big Back Yard (BOA Editions, 2003), was selected by Stephen Dobyns to receive the inaugural A. Poulin, Jr. Poetry Prize. Teig's poems have appeared in periodicals including FIELD, Black Warrior Review, Crazyhorse, The Ohio Review, and The Gettysburg Review. He is a founding editor of jubilat, a twice-yearly international poetry journal.

Teig currently (as of late 2006) lives in Easthampton, Massachusetts, where he works as a freelance writer and editor.

== Books ==
- Big Back Yard (A. Poulin, Jr. New Poets of America Series #25, BOA Editions, 2003)
- There's a Box in the Garage You Can Beat With a Stick (American Poets Continuum, BOA Editions, 2013)
