= Azhar Abidi =

Pakistani/Australian novelist

- Born: 6 February 1968 (age 58); Wah, Pakistan
- Citizenship: Pakistan, Australia (dual citizen)
- Occupations: Author, translator

Azhar Ali Abidi (born 1968 in Wah, Pakistan) is a Pakistani Australian author and translator. He went to school in Pakistan and later studied electrical engineering at the Imperial College London and Master of Business Administration at the University of Melbourne. He migrated to Australia in 1994 and lives in Melbourne, Australia.

== Career ==
Abidi has written translations, travelogues, and a number of short stories, including the Borgesian The Secret History of the Flying Carpet, which is a fictitious story in a seemingly scholarly essay. His first novel, Passarola Rising (2006), was published by Viking Penguin in Australia, USA, Canada and India and translated into Spanish and Portuguese. It is set in Europe during the eighteenth century and is the fictionalised story of a true life Brazilian priest and aviation pioneer, Bartolomeu de Gusmão, who built a flying ship but fell foul of the Inquisition. Written in the style of an old-fashioned adventure story, it is a veiled criticism of the scientific materialism emerging from the European Enlightenment, and its inability to explain spiritual and supernatural phenomena. Passarola Rising was shortlisted for the 2006 Melbourne Literature Prize.

In his second novel, Twilight (2008), Abidi turns to domestic and realist themes. Set in Pakistan during the 1980s, it is the story of an elderly matriarch, and her reaction to the changes she sees in her family and society during the turbulent times. Twilight is published by Text Publishing in Australia and by Viking Penguin in the United States and India. It appears in the United States as The House of Bilqis (2009).

In 2010, Abidi wrote an essay on Pakistan, The Road to Chitral, for Granta Online, which is a travelogue and a meditation on violence in the region.

His short story, When the Angel Comes, is set in Iran just after the Islamic revolution of 1979. When the pro-Western, pro-American Shah fled the country, thousands of his supporters were arrested and many were executed by the new regime. This story is about a diplomat and courtier of the deposed Shah who is caught up in that turmoil.

== Bibliography ==
Novels

- Passarola Rising (2006) ISBN 0670034657
- La maquina de volar (2008) ISBN 8483650509, 9788483650509
- Twilight (2008) (reissued in United States as The House of Bilqis) (2009) ISBN 0143116576
- La casa degli amori sognati (2010) ISBN 978-8854116566
- Il mio matrimonio pakistano (2011) ISBN 978-8854127326

Translations

- "Old Croc" - a short story by Hasan Manzar (Annual of Urdu Studies, Vol 16, 2001)
- "The Fall of Baghdad" - essay by Azeem Beg Chughtai (Annual of Urdu Studies, Vol 18, 2003)

Short Stories/Essays

- "Secret History of the Flying Carpet", Meanjin, Vol 63, No 2, 2004 (reissued in United States in Southwest Review, Vol 91, No 1, 2006)
- "Rosa", Words Without Borders, April 2006
- Abidi, Azhar (20 June 2009). "A Passage to the Past". The Age. The Pakistan of Azhar's childhood was already coming to an end when he took his leave.
- "Road to Chitral", Granta, September 2010
- "When the Angel Comes", , Meanjin, 2018

== Interviews ==
- The Australian interviews Azhar Abidi
- Sullivan, Jane (11 February 2006). "A writer's duty to spread his wings". The Age.
- The Dawn interview
- Azhar Abidi examines the emigrant experience in the Wall Street Journal
