= Afrikan Poetry Theatre =

Community-based Cultural Institution

The Afrikan Poetry Theatre, with the formal name The Afrikan Poetry Theatre: The Center for Culture, is a community-based cultural institution located in Jamaica, Queens, New York City.

== History ==
Established in 1976 by co-founders John Watusi Branch and Yusef Waliyaya, the theatre has been stationed at its current location, 176th Street & Jamaica Avenue, since 1979.

The Afrikan Poetry Theatre Ensemble, the progenitor to the theater, was co-founded by the late Yusef Waliyaya and the late John Watusi Branch, in 1976 as a collection of poets, singers and musicians focused on jazz, funk, African rhythms and poetry.

The Afrikan Poetry Theatre was incorporated in 1977 and found a home on Merrick Boulevard the following year. It moved to its current location, at 176-03 Jamaica Ave., in 1979.

On March 31, 2002, an electrical fire damaged much of the second floor, including a small collection of African artifacts and books.

On November 5, 2006, the theatre celebrated its thirtieth anniversary, where Queens Borough President, Helen Marshall declared the day “Afrikan Poetry Theatre” day.

After the passing of his father, Saiku Branch, son of co-founder, was named executive director.

On June 25 of 2016, the intersection of Jamaica Avenue and 176th Street in Jamaica, Queens was named John Watusi Branch Way.

Currently, the Afrikan Poetry Theatre is subject to begin renovations on a state of the art facility.

== Programs ==
Under Branch's direction, the theater expanded to offer cultural and educational tours to West Africa and developed a summer youth employment program. Branch was a respected and well-known figure in the pan-African movement to establish independence for African nations and unify black people across the world.

The Theatre presents a roster of wide-ranging cultural activities of interest to its largely African-American constituents, including music performances, lectures and workshops for aspiring filmmakers, actors, poets and writers of all ages.

Widely acclaimed activities include:

- Kings and Queens Awards Ceremony
- Tours to Africa
- Jazz Jam Sessions
- Acting Classes
- Film Classes
- ESL Acting Workshop
- APT Film Festival
- Urban Poets Movement – Open Mic Sessions
- Poetry Workshops
- Poetry is Paint Senior Arts Program
- African History for Young People

Local newspaper Queens Teens Voices has operated out of APT since 2000.

=== Annual Kwanzaa Celebration ===
APT's most popular activity is its Annual Kwanzaa Celebration uniting thousands of community residents to celebrate the 7 principles of Kwanzaa through cultural performances, speeches, food and merchandise.
