= The Margaret Fulton Cookbook =

Australian cookbook by Margaret Fulton

- Author: Margaret Fulton
- Language: English
- Subject: Cooking
- Published: 1968
- Publication place: Australia
- Media type: Print (hardcover)

The Margaret Fulton Cookbook is a cookbook by Australian cook and writer Margaret Fulton.

It was first published by Paul Hamlyn in 1968. It was an instant success. In its first year of publication, more than 200,000 copies were sold. By 1978 it had sold "more than two-thirds of a million copies".

It was Fulton's first published book; one and a half million copies of the book have been sold.

A new updated version was published in 2018 to celebrate the 50th Anniversary of her original cookbook.
