= Margaret Fulton =

Australian food writer (1924–2019)

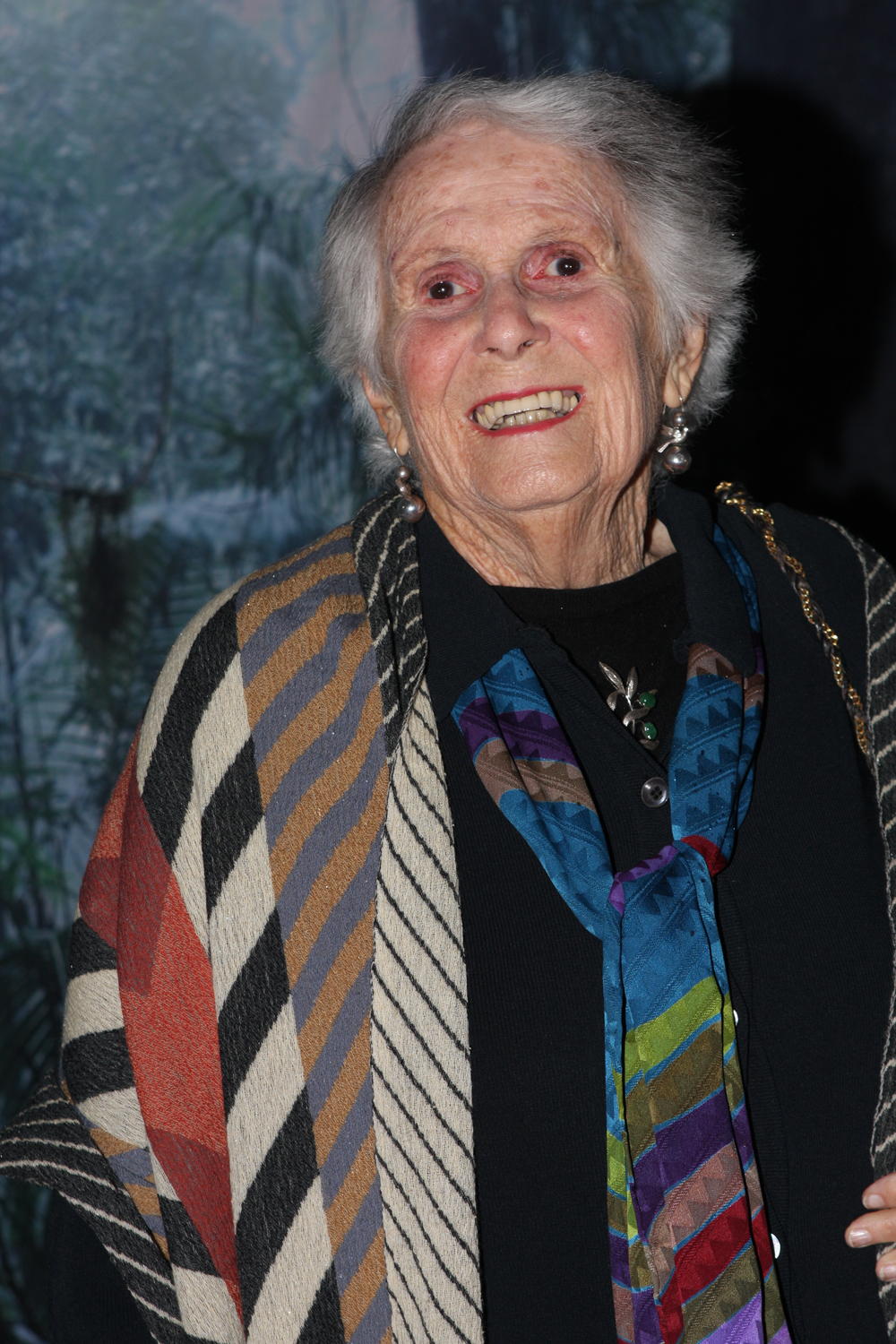
- Fulton at Entertainment Quarter, Fox Studios, Sydney, September 2012
- Born: 6 October 1924; Nairn, County of Nairn, Scotland
- Died: 24 July 2019 (aged 94); Southern Highlands, New South Wales, Australia
- Culinary career
- Television show
- Recipes from the Duchess of Duke Street
- Awardss
- Medal of the Order of Australia (1983); Diploma of honour from Comité Interprofessionnel du vin de Champagne (1986)

Margaret Isobel Fulton OAM (6 October 1924 – 24 July 2019) was a Scottish-born Australian food and cooking writer, journalist, author and commentator. She was the first of this genre of writers in Australia.

Fulton's early recipes encouraged Australians to alter their traditional staple of "meat and three vegetables" and to be creative with food. She encouraged international cuisine from places such as Spain, Italy, India and China. As the cookery editor of the Woman's Day magazine, she "brought these into Australian homes through her articles."

Although she did some television work, Fulton mainly concentrated on writing, because she felt it was her higher talent.

== Early life and career ==
Fulton was born in Nairn in the Scottish Highlands on 6 October 1924. When she was three, her parents emigrated to Australia, settling in Glen Innes, New South Wales. She was a Girl Guide as a child and leader of the Magpie Patrol in Glen Innes. In her time as a Guide she learned to cook over a campfire.

She began as a cooking teacher at the Overseas Corporation in 1947 and was later promoted to sales manager. She was "partially responsible for the introduction of the pressure cooker to Australia".

In 1954, Fulton, then a "home economist for a leading firm of cereal manufacturers", gave a talk on "cooking with ready-to-eat cereals". She told the audience that "with more wives and mothers working, speed and ease in food preparation is a 'must'". She continued, "Many women have no training in homemaking, and packaged and ready-prepared foods, like cereals, cake, pastry and biscuit mixes, canned and frozen foods, make life easier". A selection of "hot muffins made with bran" were handed out, and Fulton told the listeners that "These are quick and easy to make and most economical".

In 1956, over four days, Fulton provided French cooking demonstrations. Each day was organised with a different "well-known French hostess, resident in Sydney" who "planned a menu, contributed the recipes, helped with the cooking, and arranged the table setting".

Fulton began to appear in advertisements in the late 1950s. She promoted Johnson's Glo-coat floor polish and Johnson's Pride surface polish from her "well-appointed Sydney kitchen" in March 1957. Later that year readers of The Australian Women's Weekly were told "Margaret Fulton, expert Home Economist" believed Sellotape "is so dependable" in a full-page colour advertisement, which also offered Fulton's handy hints for using the product such as sealing plastic bags "for deep-freezing foods" and binding pot handles. In 1959, Fulton told readers she used Sellotape "each week for sticking my hundreds of recipe clippings into reference books".

Prospective buyers of Woman's Day magazine in July 1964 were promised an "8-page liftout" from Fulton, who was known for her Tuesday cookery class at Sydney's Bistro. Her regular contributions continued throughout the decade with 1968's lift-out full-colour recipe guide to Italian food, which was described by the magazine as "our most exciting ... ever!".

== 1960s and 1970s ==
The Margaret Fulton Cookbook was published by Paul Hamlyn in 1968 and was an instant success. By 1978 it had sold "more than two-thirds of a million copies".

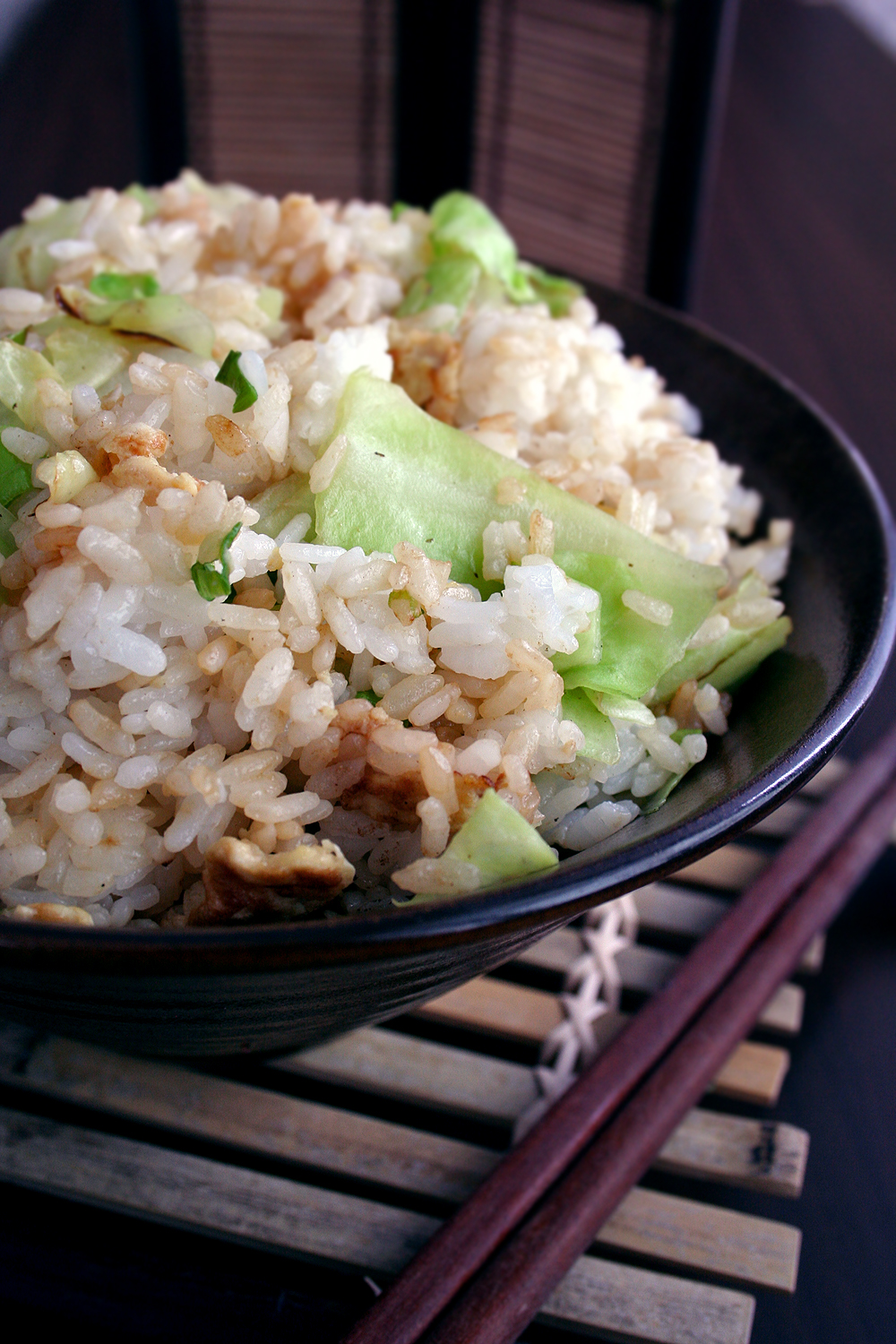
Fulton helped to popularise Chinese cuisine in Australia

She returned to the Italian theme with the publication of her Italian Cookbook in 1973. The Canberra Times said the recipes were "simple, tested ... and where necessary adapted to suit the local scene"; however, Fulton was "able to add authenticity to the book by taking a trip to Italy and checking the fare at first hand". The author was quoted as recommending that cooks "look for the specialty ingredients in a good delicatessen or gourmet section of a large retail stores. Use only the best quality Italian olive oil and when using grating cheese like Parmesan or Romano, buy it in wedges and grate it as you need it."

In October 1973, Fulton was appointed to the federal government's Interim Commission on Consumer Standards, which was formed to "reach as many groups as possible" and "find the areas where action" on standards was "most urgent".

Interviewed in 1975, Fulton provided Italian and Chinese-style recipes for readers. She included in her advice for "young people setting up home for the first time" that they should "buy a couple of really good saucepans and, if possible, invest in an iron oven casserole ... they last a lifetime and these days are so attractive that they can be taken to the table".

Following on from the popularity of late 1970s BBC television drama series The Duchess of Duke Street, set in London between 1900 and 1925, Fulton had a primetime television cooking show of five-minute episodes based on recipes from the era.

In 1979, her interest in Chinese cuisine led to her leading a planned 23-day gourmet food tour, which would include "the finest restaurants" of Guangzhou, Shanghai, Jinan, Qingdao, Kunming and Beijing. Fulton said the tour would also visit "historical sites... communes, universities, factories and handcraft institutes". She also hoped there would be "a chance to see acupuncture procedures in a Chinese hospital".

== Later life and influence ==
Fulton was awarded the Medal of the Order of Australia in the 1983 Queen's Birthday Honours "In recognition of service to the media as a journalist and writer in the field of cookery".

Fulton's encouragement of Chinese cuisine was recognised as a contributor to the development of Sydney's Chinatown, where "few non-Chinese" had ventured "before the 1950s". Fulton was one of the writers who "began serving up Chinese recipes to Menzies' Australia" (recalling the era of Robert Menzies as prime minister from 1949 to 1966) and, as a result, Chinatown's "few eating houses were seen as a welcome alternative to the spartan cuisine of the times".

In 1998, Fulton was added to the list of 100 Australian Living Treasures by the National Trust of Australia. The same year, a packaged-meals business venture 'Margaret Fulton's kitchen' failed. Fulton had been involved in it with 'Sydney food luminary' Anders Ousback.

In 2006, The Bulletin named Fulton in their list of "The 100 most influential Australians". In the citation they described her as someone who "changed the way Australians ate at home". She is, they wrote, "Australia's original domestic goddess. No cookery writer since can claim her blanket influence ... Fulton turned us into foodies."

Interviewed by The Australian Women's Weekly in 2009, Fulton said:

Scarcely a week passes when I'm not invited to speak at a food industry or fundraising function and I always try to accept. At my age, being asked to pass on what I've learned is a pleasure and a privilege.

In 2014 Fulton appeared on an Australian postage stamp as part of the 'Australia Post Legends Awards'. Chef Neil Perry, Kylie Kwong, Stephanie Alexander and Maggie Beer also featured in the same stamp series.

Fulton died on 24 July 2019 at the age of 94. No cause was given. On 30 July, the NSW Premier announced that Fulton's family had been offered a state memorial service for Fulton, which the family accepted.

== Family ==
Fulton had one daughter, Suzanne Gibbs, and two granddaughters, Kate Gibbs and Louise Keats, all of whom pursued careers in food. Kate Gibbs wrote two cookbooks and wrote a third book about Margaret's life, titled Margaret and Me.

Louise Keats explored Fulton's impact on her own childhood in her illustrated children's storybook My Grandma's Kitchen. Fulton supported Keats' food career including by sending her to the Le Cordon Bleu school of cookery. Keats later studied nutrition at Deakin University and authored five more cookbooks, crediting Fulton for inspiring her passion for food and cooking.

== Honours and awards ==
- 1983 – Medal of the Order of Australia
- 1986 – 'diploma of honour' from Comité Interprofessionnel du vin de Champagne

== Bibliography ==
Fulton wrote many books, including:

- The Margaret Fulton Cookbook (various editions)
- Encyclopaedia of Food and Cookery
