= Louise Elizabeth Rorabacher =

American author

- Born: April 10, 1906; Worden, Michigan
- Died: December 26, 1993 (aged 87); Tampa, Florida
- Occupations: Author, professor
- Writing career
- Period: 20th century
- Genre: Non-fiction

Louise Elizabeth Rorabacher (April 10, 1906 – December 26, 1993) was an author and editor, producing three college textbooks, two biographies and two collections of Australian short stories.

Born in Worden, Michigan, Rorabacher graduated from Ypsilanti High School in 1924 and from the University of Michigan (Phi Beta Kappa) in 1931 with a Bachelor of Arts degree. After graduation she taught high school in St. Louis, Michigan, then earned a Master of Arts degree from Northwestern University in 1937 and a PhD in English from the University of Illinois in 1942. She then joined the teaching faculty of Purdue University in West Lafayette, Indiana, as a professor of English.

In 1946 she took a leave from Purdue to serve with the Fifth Army Air Corps in Korea teaching college English to American occupation forces. In 1947 she transferred to Japan as an administrator of the women's program under the auspices of the Eighth Army's military occupation in Yokohama, where she taught the concepts of democracy to Japanese women.

In 1952–53, Rorabacher returned to Japan as a Fulbright lecturer at Tokyo Women's University. On her way home she made a trip around the world which included visits to Hong Kong, Siam, India, Pakistan, Lebanon, Egypt, Greece, Spain and Portugal.

In 1956 and again in 1959 she served terms as a member of the Purdue team at Cheng Kung University In Taiwan. She also served on the Washington. D.C., staff of the American Association of University Professors in 1956–57. Her special instructional field at Purdue was fiction and her special research was in the field of 19th century fiction. She took early retirement from Purdue in 1964 and joined the faculty of Western Carolina University in Cullowhee, North Carolina, where she taught until her retirement in 1969.

She died December 26, 1993, in Tampa, Florida.

== Personal life ==
Louise met her life partner Caroline Hester Lawrence (1898–1999) in the 1960s. They lived together in North Carolina and then Florida until Louise's death in 1993. They are buried together in Worden Cemetery in Salem, Michigan.

== Bibliography ==
=== Non-Fiction ===
- Assignments in Exposition. Harper & Row, 1946.
- A Concise Guide to Composition. Harper & Brothers Publishers, 1956.
- Two Ways Meet: Stories of Migrants in Australia. F. W. Cheshire, 1963.
- Marjorie Barnard and M. Barnard Eldershaw. New York, NY: Twayne Publishers, 1973.
- Frank Dalby Davidson. Twayne Publishers, 1979.

=== Editor ===
- Style and Subject. Harper & Row, 1966.
- Aliens in Their Land: The Aborigine in the Australian Short Story. Cheshire, 1968.
