= Stanley Cooperman =

American poet

Stanley Cooperman (October 22, 1929 – April 26, 1976) was a New York City-born poet. Among his books are Cannibals and among his poems are "Masada". Cooperman was a co-signatory to the 1968 manifesto "Poet Power."

== Life and career ==
Born in New York City on October 22, 1929, Stanley Cooperman became a Canadian citizen in 1972. Cooperman received his B.A. in 1951, his M.A. in 1955 from New York University, and his PhD in 1961 from the Indiana University Bloomington, where he also taught. He taught English at Simon Fraser University from 1969 to 1976. He previously taught at the University of Tehran through a Fulbright Award, the University of Oregon, and Hofstra University.

Cooperman committed suicide on April 26, 1976 at the age of 46.

== Selected publications ==
- Ernest Hemingway's the Old Man and the Sea, a Critical Commentary (Baltimore: The Johns Hopkins Press, 1963).
- The Novels of Ernest Hemingway: A Study Guide (New York: Monarch Press, 1965).
- The Novels of F. Scott Fitzierald: A Study Guide (New York: Monarch Press, 1965).
- The Novels of John Steinbeck: A Study Guide (New York: Monarch Press, 1966).
- World War I and the American Novel (Johns Hopkins University Press, 1967)
- Owl Behind the Door (McClelland & Stewart, 1968)
- The Day of the Parrot and Other Poems (University of Nebraska Press, 1968)
- Cappelbaum's Dance (University of Nebraska Press, 1970)
- Cannibals (Oberon, 1972)
- Greco's Book (Vancouver: The author, 1974).
- Canadian Gothic and Other Poems (Intermedia, 1976)
- Greco's Last Book: Selected Poems (Intermedia, 1980). Edited by Fred Candelaria.
