= David Campbell (poet) =

Australian poet & England international rugby union player (1915–1979)

David Watt Ian Campbell (16 July 1915 – 29 July 1979) was an Australian poet who wrote over 15 volumes of prose and poetry. He was also a talented rugby union player who represented England in two tests.

== Life ==
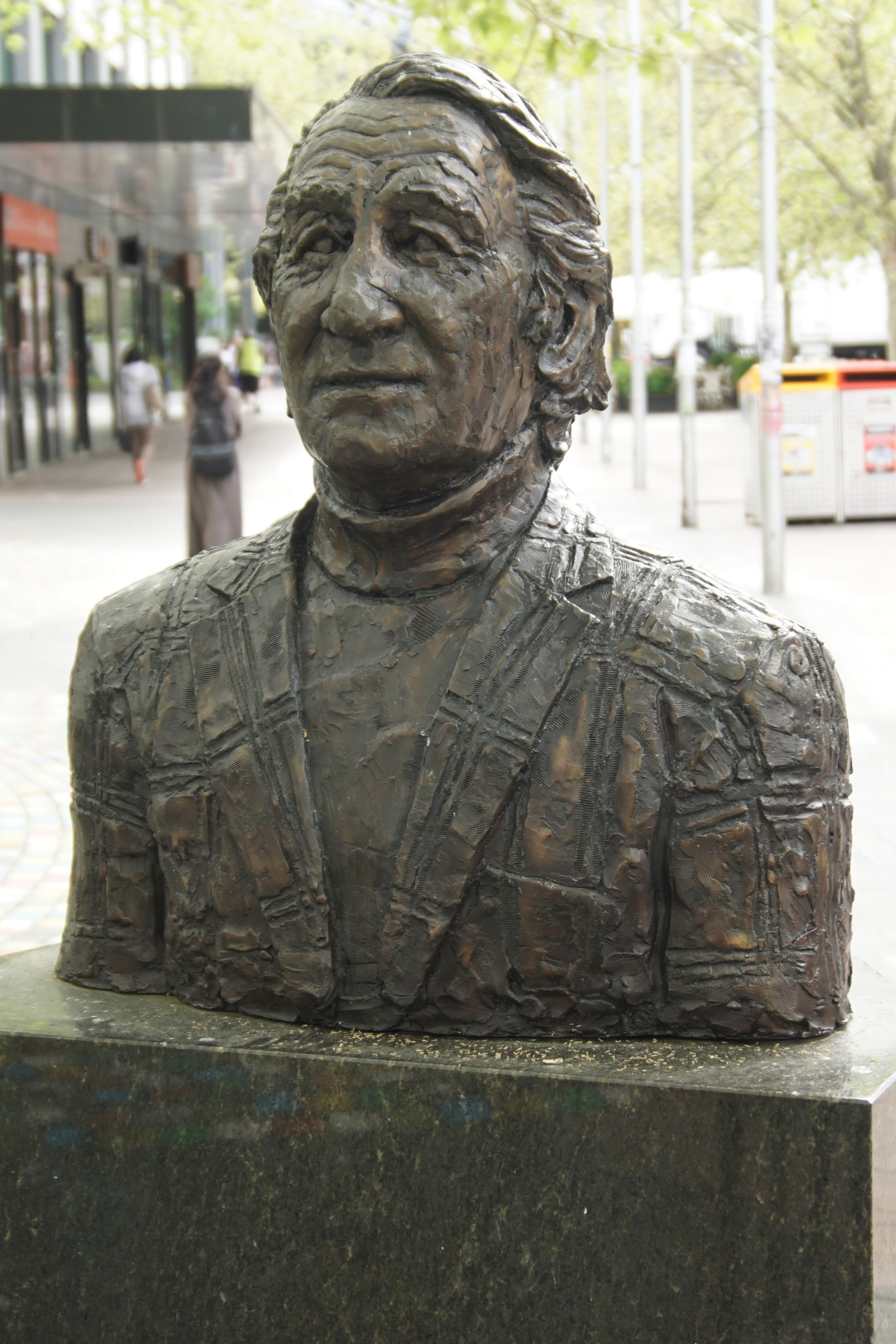
Bust of Campbell in Canberra

Campbell was born on 16 July 1915 at Ellerslie Station, near Adelong, New South Wales. He was the third child of Australian-born parents Alfred Campbell, a grazier and medical practitioner, and his wife Edith Madge, née Watt.

In 1930, Campbell went to The King's School, Parramatta, and in 1935, with the support of the headmaster, he enrolled at Jesus College, Cambridge, graduating with a Bachelor of Arts in 1937. His studies in English literature developed his interest in poetry. At Cambridge, he excelled at rugby union and as well as earning a Blue after playing in The Varsity Match, he was chosen for England. Playing at flanker he made his debut in the test match against Wales at Twickenham in 1937. He played a second test that year against Ireland.

Campbell returned to Australia from Cambridge in 1938 and on 6 November 1939 joined the Royal Australian Air Force. He had learned to fly while at Cambridge and went to train as a pilot at Point Cook. He served in New Guinea, where he was injured and awarded the Distinguished Flying Cross, and flew bombing missions from Darwin in the Northern Territory.

Campbell married Bonnie Edith Lawrence on 20 January 1940 at St John's Anglican Church, Toorak, Melbourne. They had two sons (including John) and a daughter, but were divorced in 1973. In 1946, he settled on a family property, Wells Station (now in Harrison, a suburb of Canberra), and in 1961 he moved to Palerang, near Bungendore, New South Wales. In 1968, he moved again to The Run, Queanbeyan, New South Wales.

On 18 February 1974 Campbell married Judith Anne Jones in Sydney. From May to September 1975 they travelled in England and Europe, his first trip abroad since his Cambridge days.

He had many literary friends. These included, in addition to poet and editor, Douglas Stewart, historian Manning Clark, poet Rosemary Dobson, writer Patrick White, and poet and academic A. D. Hope. He was interested in painting, golf and polo, and was a keen fisherman, an activity he often shared with Douglas Stewart. Manning Clark has written about aspects of his friendship with David Campbell. Campbell, wrote Clark "was an enlarger of life, not a straitener or measurer, or a life-denier" the key to him being found in "the two books he re-read each year: The Idiot by Dostoevsky, and The Aunt's Story by Patrick White. "He was the war hero, the victor in the boxing ring, the strong man in the rugby scrum, the fisherman, the horseman, the polo player who knew all about Myshkin [character from The Idiot] and Theodora Goodman [character from The Aunt's Story]. I saw him knock out a man in the bar at Delegate for casting doubts on his manhood. The next morning I saw him cast a fly with such delicacy that it landed on the waters of the Snowy River with the grace of a butterfly."

David Campbell died of cancer on 29 July 1979, at the Royal Canberra Hospital.

== Literary career ==
While Campbell had a few poems published in Cambridge journals between 1935 and 1937, his poetry didn't start appearing regularly in print until 1942 when he started sending poems to The Bulletin. Six were published by 1944. It was in these years that he first became known to Douglas Stewart, with whom he formed a long-standing friendship. These early poems dealt primarily with war, but from 1946, after his move to Wells Station, "his poetry became more closely attuned to the realities of the countryside". Kramer writes that "his daily life as a grazier, his acute observations of the natural world and his deep understanding of European poetry gave him a distinctive poetic voice, learned but not didactic, harmonious but not bland, vigorous but finely tuned".

The following are representative examples of his use of European and Asian (haiku) poetic forms to capture the contemplative experience of the Monaro plains.

"For now the sharp leaves
On the tree are still
And the great blond paddocks
Come down from the hill."

"See how these autumn days begin
With spider-webs against the sun,
And frozen shadows, fiery cocks,
And starlings riding sheep-backs."

"The powdered bloom along the bough
Wavers like a candle's breath;
Where snow falls softly into snow
Iris and rivers have their birth."

"White snow daisies spring,
Snowgums glint from granite rock,
Whitebacked magpies sing."

As well as writing poetry, Campbell also edited several anthologies, including the 1966 edition of Australian Poetry and, in 1970, Modern Australian Poetry. He also wrote short stories, and became known for the support he gave to young poets.

== Mullion Park ==
In November 2007, Mullion Park was officially opened in Gungahlin in the Australian Capital Territory. The park is located in an area which incorporates what was once Campbell's property at Wells Station. The original paddock boundary is marked by a line of remnant eucalypt trees and the original fence by ceramic tiles inlaid with barbed wire. The name of the park comes from the book of poems, The Miracle of Mullion Hill, which Campbell wrote when he lived at Wells Station with his family. It was published in 1956.

The park honours Campbell, "not for his work as a grazier, nor for his dedication to the Royal Australian Air Force, in which he served and was wounded as a pilot in World War II, but for his lyrical poetry about love, war and the Australian rural life". At the opening of the park, Chief Minister of the ACT, Jon Stanhope, said that Campbell is "often called the poet of the Monaro" and that his poetry "reflects the local landscape and was greatly influenced by his life as a farmer of the surrounding countryside". The park incorporates excerpts from his poems, embedded in wooden pedestals and on pathways. It is intended to connect residents of Wells Station to the heritage of the region and provide a cultural as well as a recreational retreat.

== Bibliography ==
=== Poetry ===
Collections

- Men in Green (1943)
- Speak with the Sun (1949)
- The Miracle of Mullion Hill (1956)
- Poems (1962)
- Selected Poems 1942–1968 (1968)
- The Branch of Dodona and Other Poems: 1969–1970 (1970)
- Starting from Central Station: A Sequence of Poems (1973)
- Devil's Rock and Other Poems 1970–1972 (1974)
- Moscow Trefoil: poems from the Russian of Anna Akhmatova and Osip Mandelstam (1975) with Rosemary Dobson
- Deaths and Pretty Cousins (1975)
- The History of Australia (1976)
- Encounters (1977)
- Words with a Black Orpington (1978)
- Selected Poems (1978)
- The Man in the Honeysuckle (1979)
- Seven Russian Poets: Imitations (1979)
- Hardening of the Light : Selected Poems (2006)

Selected list of poems

Title	Year	First published	Reprinted/collected
"Windy Gap"	1951	The Bulletin, 12 December 1951	Selected Poems 1942–1968, Angus and Robertson, 1968, p. 35
"In the Glass"	1965	Campbell, David (March 1965). "In the glass". Meanjin Quarterly. 24 (1): 24.	

=== Short fiction ===
Collections

- Flame and Shadow: Selected Stories (1959)
- Evening Under Lamplight: Selected Stories of David Campbell (1988)

=== Letters ===
- Letters Lifted into Poetry: Selected Correspondence between David Campbell and Douglas Stewart, 1946–1979 (2006) edited by Jonathan Persse

=== Sound recordings ===
- David Campbell Reads from His Own Work (1975)

=== Critical studies, reviews and biographies ===
- Clark, Manning (1979), David Campbell 1915-1979, Brindabella Pr, ISBN 978-0-909422-07-3
- Heseltine, Harry (1987), A Tribute to David Campbell : a collection of essays, New South Wales University Press, ISBN 978-0-86840-202-4
- Kramer, Leonie (2006) "Campbell, David Watt Ian (1915–1979)", Australian Dictionary of Biography, Online Edition Accessed: 2007-11-30
- Persse, Jonathan (November 2006). "Letters lifted into poetry". National Library of Australia News. XVII (2): 11–14.
- Persse, Jonathan (2020), David Campbell : a life of the poet, Australian Scholarly Publishing, ISBN 978-1-925984-02-6

== Awards ==
- 1968: Grace Leven Prize for Poetry for Selected Poems 1942–1968
- 1970: Henry Lawson Australian Arts Award
- 1980: Kenneth Slessor Prize for Poetry for Man in the Honeysuckle

== Legacy ==
The David Campbell Award was awarded as part of the ACT Poetry Award by the ACT Government between 2005 and 2011, for an unpublished poem by an Australian poet.
