= Geoff Page =

Australian poet

- Born: Geoffrey Donald Page; 7 September 1940 (age 85); Grafton, New South Wales, Australia
- Occupation: Poet
- Writing career
- Notable awards: 2001 Patrick White Award; 2006 Christopher Brennan Award

Geoffrey Donald Page OAM (born 7 July 1940) is an Australian poet, novelist, translator, teacher and jazz enthusiast.

He has published 22 collections of poetry, as well as prose and verse novels. Poetry and jazz are his driving interests, and he has also written a biography of the jazz musician Bernie McGann. He organises poetry readings and jazz events in Canberra.

== Life ==
Geoff Page was born in Grafton, New South Wales, and studied at the University of New England. Sir Earle Page, who was briefly Prime Minister of Australia, was his grandfather.

== Career ==
Page has held residencies at numerous academic, military and political institutions, including Edith Cowan University, Curtin University, the Australian Defence Force Academy, and the University of Wollongong. From 1974 to 2001 Page was head of the English department at Narrabundah College, a secondary college in Canberra. He retired from teaching in 2001.

He has travelled widely, talking on Australian poetry in Switzerland, Britain, Italy, Singapore, China, the United States and New Zealand. His poetic style ranges from lyrical to satirical, from serious to humorous – and often addresses his concerns about contemporary society and politics. Judith Beveridge writes that "Page is a humanely satirical poet. He lets us view our condition with a fusion of the comic and the tragic."

Page is the poetry reviewer for ABC Radio's The Book Show and, for a decade before that, its Books and Writing program.

Page curates the Poetry at the Gods and Jazz at the Gods series at the Gods Cafe in Canberra.

He was awarded the Medal of the Order of Australia in the 2023 Australia Day Honours.

== Style ==
Australian poet John Tranter in his 1983 review of The Younger Australian Poets (edited by Robert Gray and Geoffrey Lehmann) wrote of Page:

He is not a self-promoter, and his modest output has been inadequately represented in recent anthologies, as the editors of this one quite properly point out. His poetry has been influenced loosely by the American William Carlos Williams. In general, the spare precision of Williams' short lines is a good preventive against galloping garrulity, and in Page's hands it delivers a dry and particularly Australian accent and a thoughtful movement from phrase to phrase. The short line, as a model, can be overdone: 'of 3 a.m.' is an example that does little for me. Page's technique is low-key – his French and American influences are invisible in the texture of his localised speech – yet it enables him to range widely among language and experience.

== Awards and nominations ==
- Queensland Premier's Literary Awards for Poetry
- 2001: Patrick White Award
- 2001: Grace Leven Prize for Poetry, for Darker and Lighter
- 2004: ACT Writing and Publishing Awards for poetry for The Indigo Book of Modern Australian Sonnets (editor)
- 2006: Christopher Brennan Award
- 2017: ACU Poetry Prize for the poem "Charles S. Ryan to Alice E. Sumner"
- 2020: ACU Poetry Prize for the poem "Jericho"

== Bibliography ==
I look up Wikipedia
and find instead the world,
the way it tends to ramify,
its openness to doubt,
the "more work needed" here and there,
"citations to be added",
an absence of the absolute,
the comfort of the useful
while everything is slipping sideways
and yet it mainly works.
Even those two testaments
were written by successive hands
imagining dictation.
The world, it's plain, is inexact –
and so with Wikipedia.
In love with the provisional
it's planning to embrace the earth
and tweak it into sense.

— Geoff Page in The Weekend Australian,
31 May/1 June 2014, Review, p. 20

=== Poetry ===
Collections

- Page, Geoff (1971). "The question". In Page, Geoff; Roberts, Philip (eds.). Two poets. St Lucia, Qld.: University of Queensland Press.
- — (1975). Smalltown memorials. St Lucia, Qld.: University of Queensland Press.
- — (1978). Collecting the weather. [Gargoyle Poets; 32]. Brisbane: Makar Press.
- — (1980). Cassandra Paddocks.
- — (1983). Clairvoyant in autumn.
- Collected Lives (1986)
- Smiling in English, Smoking in French (1987)
- Footwork (1988)
- Selected Poems (1991)
- Gravel Corners (1992)
- Human Interest (1994)
- Mrs Schnell arrives in heaven, and other light verse (1995)
- Page, Geoff (1996). The secret. Kew, Vic.: William Heinemann Australia.
- The Great Forgetting (Geoff Page and Bevan Hayward Pooaraar) (1997)
- Bernie McGann: A Life in Jazz (1997)
- The Scarring (1999, verse novel)
- Collateral Damage (1999)
- Darker and Lighter (2001)
- My Mother's God (2002)
- Drumming on Water (2003, verse novel)
- Cartes Postales (2004)
- Freehold (2005, verse novel)
- Agnostic Skies (2006)
- Europe 101 (2006)
- Bahn dance (2007)
- Seriatim (2007)
- Coda for Shirley (2011)
- A Sudden Sentence in the Air: Jazz Poems (2011)
- Cloudy Nouns (2012)
- Shifting Windows (2012)
- 1953 (2013)
- New Selected Poems (2013)
- Improving the News (2013)
- Gods and Uncles (2015)
- Cara Carissima, a verse drama (2015)
- Plevna: A Biography in Verse: Sir Charles 'Plevna' Ryan (1853–1926) UWA Publishing (2016)
- Hard Horizons (2017)
- Elegy for Emily: A verse biography of Emily Remler (1957–1990) (2018)
- In Media Res (2019)
- 101 Poems (2011-2021) (2022)
- Penultima (2023)

Selected list of poems

Title	Year	First published	Reprinted/collected
Jimmy James	1996	Page, Geoff (January–February 1996). "Jimmy James". Quadrant. 40 (1–2 [323]): 71.	
The horizontals	1996	Page, Geoff (March 1996). "The horizontals". Quadrant. 40 (3): 32.	
The second law	1996	Page, Geoff (March 1996). "The second law". Quadrant. 40 (3): 32.	
Secular rites	1996	Page, Geoff (1996). The secret. Kew, Vic.: William Heinemann Australia.	"Secular rites". Australian Poetry Library.
The shovel	1996	Page, Geoff (July–August 1996). "The shovel". Quadrant. 40 (7–8): 20.	

=== Criticism and anthologies ===
- A Reader's Guide to Contemporary Australian Poetry (1995)
- The Indigo Book of Modern Australian Sonnets (as editor) (2003), winner of the 2004 ACT Writing and Publishing Awards for poetry
- 60 Classic Australian Poems (2009, and a companion to his 80 Great Poems from Chaucer to Now)

=== Book reviews ===
Date	Review article	Work(s) reviewed
2013	Page, Geoff (April 2013). "[Untitled review]". Australian Book Review. 350: 40.	Emery, Brook (2012). Collusion. St Kilda, Vic.: John Leonard Press.
2013	Page, Geoff (April 2013). "Lords of nothing". Australian Book Review. 350: 65.	Rieth, Homer (2013). 150 motets. North Fitzroy, Vic.: Black Pepper.
2014	Page, Geoff (September 2014). "[Untitled review]". Australian Book Review. 364: 42.	Turner, Todd (2014). Woodsmoke. North Fitzroy, Vic.: Black Pepper.

=== Memoirs and nonfiction ===
- Invisible Histories (1989)
- Bernie McGann: A life in jazz (1997)
- Canberra Then and Now (2013)
- Aficionado: A Jazz Memoir (2014)

Benton's Conviction (A Novel) (1985) Angus & Robertson.

=== Works in progress ===
- Shadows from Wire (Poems and photographs in the Great War, as editor)
- Century of Clouds (Selected Poems of Guillaume Apollinaire, translations with Wendy Coutts)
